= 1978 Michigan Wolverines football team =

American college football season

1978 Michigan Wolverines football

Big Ten champion

Rose Bowl, L 10–17 vs. USC
- Conference: Big Ten Conference

Ranking
- Coaches: No. 5
- AP: No. 5
- Record: 10–2 (7–1 Big Ten)
- Head coach: Bo Schembechler (10th season)
- Defensive coordinator: Bill McCartney (2nd season)
- MVP: Rick Leach
- Captains: Russell Davis; Jerry Meter
- Home stadium: Michigan Stadium

1978 Big Ten Conference football standings
	Conf.					Overall
Team	W		L		T	W		L		T
No. 5 Michigan +	7	–	1	–	0	10	–	2	–	0
No. 12 Michigan State +	7	–	1	–	0	8	–	3	–	0
No. 13 Purdue	6	–	1	–	1	9	–	2	–	1
Ohio State	6	–	2	–	0	7	–	4	–	1
Minnesota	4	–	4	–	0	5	–	6	–	0
Wisconsin	3	–	4	–	2	5	–	4	–	2
Indiana	3	–	5	–	0	4	–	7	–	0
Iowa	2	–	6	–	0	2	–	9	–	0
Illinois	0	–	6	–	2	1	–	8	–	2
Northwestern	0	–	8	–	1	0	–	10	–	1
+ – Conference co-champions; Rankings from AP Poll

The 1978 Michigan Wolverines football team was an American football team that represented the University of Michigan in the 1978 Big Ten Conference football season. In their 10th season under head coach Bo Schembechler, the Wolverines compiled a 10–2 record (7–1 against conference opponents), tied for the Big Ten championship, outscored opponents by a total of 372 to 105, and were ranked No. 5 in the final AP and UPI polls. The defense allowed only 94.6 passing yards per game and ranked second in the country in scoring defense, allowing an average of only 8.75 points per game.

The Wolverines sustained their only regular season defeat against in-state rival Michigan State, but defeated rivals Notre Dame (the first game in the Michigan–Notre Dame football rivalry since 1943) and Ohio State (the last game in The Ten Year War between coaches Schembechler and Woody Hayes). The Wolverines then lost to No. 3 USC in the 1979 Rose Bowl, following Charles White's famed "phantom touchdown".

The team's statistical leaders included senior quarterback Rick Leach with 1,283 passing yards and 72 points scored, tailback Harlan Huckleby with 741 rushing yards, and wing back Ralph Clayton with 546 receiving yards. Leach won the Chicago Tribune Silver Football trophy as the most valuable player in the Big Ten Conference, finished third in the Heisman Trophy voting, and was selected by the American Football Coaches Association as a first-team All-American in a tie with Chuck Fusina.

Eight Michigan players received first-team honors on the 1978 All-Big Ten Conference football team, including Leach, fullback Russell Davis, offensive tackle Jon Giesler, defensive tackle Curtis Greer, linebacker Ron Simpkins, and defensive backs Mike Jolly and Mike Harden.

== Schedule ==
Date	Opponent	Rank	Site	TV	Result	Attendance
September 16	Illinois	No. 4	Michigan Stadium; Ann Arbor, MI (rivalry)		W 31–0	104,102
September 23	at No. 14 Notre Dame*	No. 5	Notre Dame Stadium; Notre Dame, IN (rivalry)	ABC	W 28–14	59,075
September 30	Duke*	No. 4	Michigan Stadium; Ann Arbor, MI		W 52–0	104,832
October 7	Arizona*	No. 3	Michigan Stadium; Ann Arbor, MI		W 21–17	104,913
October 14	Michigan State	No. 5	Michigan Stadium; Ann Arbor, MI (rivalry)		L 15–24	105,132
October 21	at Wisconsin	No. 9	Camp Randall Stadium; Madison, WI		W 42–0	80,024
October 28	Minnesota^{†}	No. 8	Michigan Stadium; Ann Arbor, MI (Little Brown Jug)		W 42–10	105,308
November 4	at Iowa	No. 8	Kinnick Stadium; Iowa City, IA		W 34–0	49,120
November 11	at Northwestern	No. 7	Dyche Stadium; Evanston, IL (rivalry)		W 59–14	27,013
November 18	No. 15 Purdue	No. 7	Michigan Stadium; Ann Arbor, MI		W 24–6	105,410
November 25	at No. 16 Ohio State	No. 6	Ohio Stadium; Columbus, OH (The Game)	ABC	W 14–3	88,358
January 1, 1979	vs. No. 3 USC*	No. 5	Rose Bowl; Pasadena, CA (Rose Bowl)	NBC	L 10–17	105,629
*Non-conference game; ^{†}Homecoming; Rankings from AP Poll released prior to the game

== Season summary ==
=== Preseason ===
The 1977 Michigan Wolverines football team compiled a 10–2 record and was a Big Ten co-champion. Key players returning from the 1977 team included quarterback Rick Leach, running backs Russell Davis and Harlan Huckleby, and linebacker Ron Simpkins. Others not returning included offensive linemen Mark Donahue, Walt Downing, and Mike Kenn, linebacker/punter John Anderson, and defensive back Dwight Hicks.

The 1978 recruiting class included tailback Butch Woolfolk, offensive tackles Bubba Paris and Ed Muransky, and defensive back Brian Carpenter.

=== Illinois ===
Week 1: Illinois at Michigan

Team	1	2	3	4	Total
Illinois	0	0	0	0	0
• Michigan	0	10	0	21	31

- Date: September 16
- Location: Ann Arbor, MI
- Game attendance: 104,102

Scoring summary
2	MICH	Gregg Willner 46-yard field goal	MICH 3-0
2	MICH	Rick Leach 8-yard run (Willner kick)	MICH 10-0
4	MICH	Roosevelt Smith 3-yard run (Willner kick)	MICH 17-0
4	MICH	Leach 2-yard run (Willner kick)	MICH 24-0
4	MICH	B. J. Dickey 1-yard run (Willner kick)	MICH 31-0

On September 16, Michigan, ranked No. 4 in the pre-season polls, opened its season with a 31–0 victory over an Illinois team led by Michigan's former defensive coordinator, Gary Moeller. The game was played before a crowd of 104,102 at Michigan Stadium and gave coach Schembechler a 10–0 record against the Illini.

Quarterback Rick Leach led Michigan's option offense, passing for 75 yards and rushing for another 125 yards (96 net yards after accounting for sacks) and two touchdowns. The offense was stymied in the first quarter, but an interception by Mel Owen gave Michigan good field position and led to a Gregg Willner field goal early in the second quarter. Leach also scored on an eight-yard touchdown run, and Michigan led 10–0 at halftime. The Wolverines scored another 21 points in the fourth quarter. Roosevelt Smith scored on a three-yard run, and Leach's second touchdown followed a fumble recovery by walk-on middle guard Jim Humphries at Illinois' 31-yard line. Backup quarterback B. J. Dickey scored the final touchdown with 34 seconds remaining in the game.

On defense, Michigan limited Illinois to 177 yards and came up with two turnovers, both leading to Michigan scores. The defense was led by linebackers Ron Simpkins with 12 tackles (eight solo, four assists), Jerry Meter with 10 (nine solo, one assist), and Tom Seabron (six solo tackles).

=== Notre Dame ===
Week 2: Michigan at Notre Dame

Team	1	2	3	4	Total
• Michigan	0	7	7	14	28
Notre Dame	7	7	0	0	14

- Date: September 23
- Location: South Bend, IN
- Game attendance: 59,075
- TV announcers (ABC): Chris Schenkel, Frank Broyles, Bill Flemming

Scoring summary
1	13:07	ND	Dennis Grindinger 6-yard pass from Joe Montana (Joe Unis kick)	ND 7-0
2	9:39	MICH	Rick Leach 4-yard run (Gregg Willner kick)	TIE 7-7
2	5:21	ND	Vagas Ferguson 4-yard run (Unis kick)	ND 14-7
3		MICH	Doug Marsh 5-yard pass from Leach (Willner kick)	TIE 14-14
4	14:55	MICH	Marsh 17-yard pass from Leach (kick failed)	MICH 20-14
4	9:18	MICH	Ralph Clayton 40-yard pass from Leach (Leach sacked, attempting to pass)	MICH 26-14
4		MICH	Safety, Joe Montana tackled by Curtis Greer in end zone	MICH 28-14

On September 23, Michigan defeated Notre Dame, 28–14, before a crowd of 59,075 at Notre Dame Stadium. The first meeting in the Michigan–Notre Dame football rivalry since 1943, the game matched the schools' "duelling quarterbacks" Joe Montana and Rick Leach. Montana had led the 1977 Notre Dame team to a national championship.

Russell Davis fumbled on Michigan's first play from scrimmage, and Notre Dame recovered the ball at Michigan's 17-yard line. With only a minute and 53 seconds off the clock, Notre Dame took an early lead on a six-yard touchdown pass from Montana to Dennis Gridinger.

In the middle of the second quarter, Leach led the Wolverines on a 70-yard drive ending with a four-yard touchdown run by Leach.

After Michigan's touchdown, Montana led a 59-yard drive capped by a four-yard touchdown run by Vagas Ferguson. The first half ended with Notre Dame leading, 14–7.

In the third quarter, Leach led a 72-yard drive ending with a five-yard touchdown pass from Leach to Doug Marsh who was wide open in the end zone.

Near the end of the third quarter, Jerry Meter then intercepted a Joe Montana pass near midfield and returned it to the Notre Dame 34-yard line. On the first play of the fourth quarter, Michigan then capitalized on the turnover when Leach threw a second touchdown pass to Marsh, this one covering 17 yards. Gregg Willner missed the extra point kick, and Michigan led, 20–14.

A short time later, Mike Harden intercepted a Joe Montana pass near the Michigan's 42-yard line. Michigan again capitalized on the turnover as Leach threw a 40-yard pass to Ralph Clayton. Clayton was knocked unconscious by a hard tackle in the end zone but held onto the ball for the touchdown. After the touchdown, Leach was sacked on an attempt to pass for a two-point conversion.

Near the end of the game, Curtis Greer sacked Montana in the end zone for a safety to extend Michigan's lead to 28–14.

The ABC broadcast crew named Rick Leach and Jerry Meter as the Chevrolet Offensive and Defensive Players of the Game. Michigan tailback Harlan Huckleby also rushed effectively in the second half, finishing the game with 107 yards on 22 carries. In addition to the two interceptions, Michigan also blocked a punt and a field goal and recovered three Notre Dame fumbles for a total of five turnovers. Notre Dame linebacker Bob Golic played a great game, setting a school record with 26 tackles in the game.

=== Duke ===
Week 3: Duke at Michigan

Team	1	2	3	4	Total
Duke	0	0	0	0	0
• Michigan	7	17	14	14	52

- Date: September 30
- Location: Ann Arbor, MI
- Game attendance: 104,832

Scoring summary
1	MICH	Russell Davis 1-yard run (Gregg Willner kick)	Michigan 7-0
2	MICH	Rick Leach 12-yard run (Willner kick)	Michigan 14-0
2	MICH	Harlan Huckleby 1-yard run (Willner kick)	Michigan 21-0
2	MICH	Willner 35-yard field goal	Michigan 24-0
3	MICH	Huckleby 1-yard run (Willner kick)	Michigan 31-0
3	MICH	Lawrence Reid 2-yard run (Willner kick)	Michigan 38-0
4	MICH	Smith 6-yard run (Willner kick)	Michigan 45-0
4	MICH	Ralph Clayton 8-yard pass from B. J. Dickey (Willner kick)	Michigan 52-0

On September 30, Michigan defeated Duke, 52–0, before a crowd of 104,832 at a rainy Michigan Stadium. It was Duke's worst defeat since 1966.

Michigan's offense gained 478 yards of total offense, including 390 rushing yards. Michigan played its second-string backfield in the second half, and its rushing yardage was spread among several backs, including Harlan Huckleby (84 yards and two touchdowns), Rick Leach (72 yards and a touchdown), Roosevelt Smith (66 yards and a touchdown), Russell Davis (64 yards and a touchdown), and Lawrence Reid (58 yards and a touchdown). Backup quarterback B. J. Dickey threw an eight-yard touchdown pass to Ralph Clayton in the fourth quarter.

The defense held Duke to 76 yards of total offense (including six yards in the second quarter). The Blue Devils crossed midfield only once, and even that drive was pushed back into Duke territory by the defense. Quarterback Mike Dunn, the third leading rusher in Duke history, was held to minus 18 rushing yards, and four of his passes were intercepted (two by Mike Jolly). Dale Keitz also recovered a fumble at Duke's one-yard line to set up Huckleby's touchdown run.

=== Arizona ===
Week 4: Arizona at Michigan

Team	1	2	3	4	Total
Arizona	7	10	0	0	17
• Michigan	7	7	0	7	21

- Date: October 7
- Location: Ann Arbor, MI
- Game attendance: 104,913

Scoring summary
1		MICH	Harlan Huckleby 2-yard run (Gregg Willner kick)	MICH 7-0
1		ARIZ	Larry Heater, 1-yard run (Bill Zivic kick)	TIE 7-7
2		ARIZ	Zivic 24-yard field goal	ARIZ 10-7
2		ARIZ	Hubie Oliver 10-yard run (Zivic kick)	ARIZ 17-7
2		MICH	Doug Marsh 30-yard pass from Rick Leach (Willner kick)	ARIZ 17-14
4	5:25	MICH	Russell Davis 1-yard run (Willner kick)	MICH 21-17

On October 7, Michigan, ranked No. 3 by the AP and UPI, had to come from behind to defeat Arizona, 21–17, before a crowd of 104,913 at Michigan Stadium. Michigan took the lead on a two-yard touchdown run by Harlan Huckleby in the first quarter, a score set up by Tom Seabron's recovery of a fumble at the Arizona two-yard line. Arizona then scored 17 unanswered points in the second quarter to take a 17–7 lead. Arizona's touchdowns were set up by Michigan turnovers – a fumbled punt return by Mike Harden recovered at the Michigan 19-yard line and then a fumble by Rick Leach on a pitch-out at Michigan's 21-yard line. The Wildcats out-gained the Wolverines in the first half by 206 yards to 123.

Arizona fullback Hubie Oliver gained 80 yards in the first half but was held to 19 yards in the second half. Michigan scored on a 30-yard touchdown pass from Leach to Doug Marsh late in the second quarter. The winning score was a one-yard touchdown run by Russell Davis with 5:25 remaining in the game. An earlier attempt by Michigan to take the lead was thwarted when Leach's pass from the one-yard line was intercepted in the end zone.

Huckleby had 104 rushing yards on 18 carries, and Davis had 76 yards on 19 carries. The defense was led by linebacker Ron Simpkins with 13 solo tackles and three assists.

=== Michigan State ===
Week 5: Michigan State at Michigan

Team	1	2	3	4	Total
• Michigan State	3	14	7	0	24
Michigan	0	0	7	8	15

- Date: October 14
- Location: Ann Arbor, MI
- Game attendance: 105,132

Scoring summary
1	MSU	Morten Anderson 38-yard field goal	MSU 3-0
2	MSU	Lonnie Middleton 10-yard pass from Eddie Smith (Anderson kick)	MSU 10-0
2	MSU	Middleton 1-yard run (Anderson kick)	MSU 17-0
3	MICH	Rick Leach 3-yard run (Greg Willer kick)	MSU 17-7
3	MSU	Mark Brammer 11-yard pass from Smith (Anderson kick)	MSU 24-7
4	MICH	Russell Davis 4-yard run (Harlan Huckleby pass from Leach)	MSU 24-15

On October 14, Michigan, ranked No. 5, lost to Darryl Rogers' unranked Michigan State Spartans by a score of 24–15. The crowd of 105,132 at Michigan Stadium was the largest crowd to watch a Michigan–Michigan State game up to that point. The Spartans were on NCAA probation that prevented them from playing in a bowl game.

Freshman placekicker Morten Anderson, later inducted into the Pro Football Hall of Fame, opened the scoring with a 38-yard field goal in the first quarter, and fullback Lonnie Middleton scored two touchdowns in the second quarter to give the Spartans a 17–0 lead at halftime. Michigan State quarterback Eddie Smith completed 20 of 36 passes for 248 yards and two touchdowns, and the Spartan backs rushed for an identical 248 yards on 43 carries. Flanker Kirk Gibson caught five passes for 82 yards. Michigan State's total of 496 yards (307 in the first half) was the most allowed by a Michigan team since 1961.

Michigan quarterback Rick Leach, who had only one interception in Michigan's first four games, threw three in the first half. Tailback Harlan Huckleby rushed for 98 yards to lead the Michigan offense, while linebacker Ron Simpkins led the defense with 15 solo tackles and an assist.

=== Wisconsin ===
Week 6: Michigan at Wisconsin

Team	1	2	3	4	Total
• Michigan	14	7	14	7	42
Wisconsin	0	0	0	0	0

- Date: October 21
- Location: Madison, WI
- Game attendance: 80,024

Scoring summary
1	MICH	Rick Leach 1-yard run (Gregg Willner kick)	MICH 7-0
1	MICH	Ralph Clayton 27-yard run (Willner kick)	MICH 14-0
2	MICH	Harlan Huckleby 17-yard run (Willner kick)	MICH 21-0
3	MICH	Leach 6-yard run (Willner kick)	MICH 28-0
3	MICH	Clayton 65-yard pass from Leach (Willner kick)	MICH 35-0
4	MICH	B. J. Dickey 3-yard run (Willner kick)	MICH 42-0

On October 21, Michigan defeated the previously unbeaten Wisconsin Badgers, 42–0, before a record-setting crowd of 80,024 at Camp Randall Stadium in Madison, Wisconsin. Quarterback Rick Leach ran for 82 yards and two rushing touchdowns and completed four of seven passes for 101 yards, including a 65-yard touchdown bomb to wingback Ralph Clayton in the third quarter. Clayton also scored in the first quarter on a 27-yard wingback reverse with Leach holding the ball behind his back for the exchange with Clayton. Harlan Huckleby rushed for 98 yards and a touchdown on 18 carries. In his first game, freshman Butch Woolfolk played the second half in place of Huckleby and gained 32 yards on six carries. Michigan out-gained Wisconsin by 477 yards to 227. The victory was the 12th in a row for Michigan against Wisconsin and the 600th overall in Michigan football history.

=== Minnesota ===
Week 7: Minnesota at Michigan

Team	1	2	3	4	Total
Minnesota	0	3	0	7	10
• Michigan	7	7	21	7	42

- Date: October 28
- Location: Ann Arbor, MI
- Game attendance: 105,308

Scoring summary
1	MICH	Ralph Clayton 26-yard pass from Rick Leach (Gregg Willner kick)	MICH 7-0
2	MICH	Leach 8-yard run (Willner kick)	MICH 14-0
2	MINN	Paul Rogind 20-yard field goal	MICH 14-3
3	MICH	Doug Marsh 3-yard pass from Leach (Willer kick)	MICH 21-3
3	MICH	Leach 3-yard run (Willner kick)	MICH 28-3
3	MICH	Clayton 1-yard pass from Leach (Willner kick)	MICH 35-3
4	MINN	Kent Kitzmann 2-yard run (Rogind kick)	MICH 35-10
4	MICH	Butch Woolfolk 49-yard run (Willner kick)	MICH 42-10

On October 28, Michigan defeated Minnesota, 42–10, before a homecoming crowd of 105,308 at a sunny Michigan Stadium. One year earlier, Minnesota had upset Michigan, then ranked No. 1 in the AP and UPI polls. The Wolverines reclaimed the Little Brown Jug trophy in 1978.

In three quarters of play, Michigan quarterback Rick Leach completed nine of 13 passes for 143 yards and three touchdowns (two to Ralph Clayton, one to Doug Marsh). He also rushed for 62 yards and two touchdowns on 14 carries. With his performance in the game, Leach set a new Big Ten record with 39 touchdown passes and a new Michigan record with 209 pass completions. Freshman tailback Butch Woolfolk, in his second game and first start for Michigan, gained 131 rushing yards on 23 carries, including a 49-yard touchdown run in the fourth quarter. Woolfolk also turned the ball over on a run play from the Minnesota four-yard line. Michigan out-gained Minnesota by 455 yards to 211.

=== Iowa ===
Week 8: Michigan at Iowa

Team	1	2	3	4	Total
• Michigan	10	14	3	7	34
Iowa	0	0	0	0	0

- Date: November 4
- Location: Iowa City, IA
- Game attendance: 49,120

Scoring summary
1	MICH	Roosevelt Smith 6-yard run (Gregg Willner kick)	MICH 7-0
1	MICH	Willner 30-yard field goal	MICH 10-0
2	MICH	Alan Mitchell 36-yard pass from Rick Leach (Willner kick)	MICH 17-0
2	MICH	Smith 14-yard pass from Leach (Willner kick)	MICH 24-0
3	MICH	Willner 24-yard field goal	MICH 27-0
4	MICH	Doug Marsh 11-yard pass from B. J. Dickey (Willner kick)	MICH 34-0

On November 4, Michigan defeated Iowa, 34–0, before a crowd of 49,120 at Kinnick Stadium in Iowa City, Iowa. Rick Leach completed nine of 17 passes for 191 yards and two touchdowns (a 36-yarder to Alan Mitchell in the second quarter and an 11-yarder to Doug Marsh in the fourth quarter). Michigan also ran a fake punt with Russell Davis taking the snap and running for a 24-yard gain in the first quarter. Michigan's defense held Iowa to minus four rushing yards and 65 passing yards. After the game, Iowa Coach Bob Commings said: "I really thought our pass coverage was adequate but he had all day to throw the ball . . . that's the best offensive line we've faced all year. In fact, Michigan is the best team we've faced all year."

=== Northwestern ===
Week 9: Michigan at Northwestern

Team	1	2	3	4	Total
• Michigan	14	21	10	14	59
Northwestern	0	14	0	0	14

- Date: November 11
- Location: Evanston, IL
- Game attendance: 27,013

Scoring summary
1	5:14	MICH	Rick Leach 1-yard run (Gregg Willner kick)	MICH 7-0
1	3:01	MICH	Ralph Clayton 9-yard pass from Leach (Willner kick)	MICH 14-0
2		NW	Steve Bogan 2-yard pass from Kevin Strasser (Sam Poulos kick)	MICH 14-7
2		MICH	Clayton 41-yard pass from Leach (Willner kick)	MICH 21-7
2		MICH	Leach 12-yard run (Willner kick)	MICH 28-7
2		NW	Mike Cammon 1-yard run (Poulos kick)	MICH 28-14
2		MICH	Harlan Huckleby 2-yard run (Willner kick)	MICH 42-14
3		MICH	Leach 5-yard run (Willner kick)	MICH 35-14
3		MICH	Willner 24-yard field goal	MICH 38-14
4		MICH	B. J. Dickey 40-yard run (Willner kick)	MICH 45-14
4	4:09	MICH	Butch Woolfolk 1-yard run (Willner kick)	MICH 52-0

On November 11, Michigan defeated Northwestern, 59–14, before a homecoming crowd of 27,013 at Dyche Stadium in Evanston, Illinois. Michigan quarterback Rick Leach ran for 44 yards and three touchdowns and completed six of six passes for 131 yards and two touchdowns. Michigan gained 626 yards in the game, including 470 rushing yards. Harlan Huckleby and Roosevelt Smith led the ground attack with 138 and 84 yards, respectively. Ralph Clayton was the leading receiver, catching five passes for 122 yards and two touchdowns, including a 41-yard touchdown reception in the second quarter. After the game, coach Schembechler said: "We didn't even run the option that much. Basically, all we did was hand off the ball and block."

With his performance against Northwestern, Leach set an NCAA career record with 75 regular-season touchdowns, surpassing the record set by Danny White. He also set a Michigan single-season record with 34 rushing touchdowns, surpassing the mark previously set by Tom Harmon. Finally, he set a new Big Ten Conference career record with 5,968 yards of total offense, breaking the record previously set by Mike Phipps.

=== Purdue ===
Week 10: Purdue at Michigan

Team	1	2	3	4	Total
Purdue	0	0	0	6	6
• Michigan	10	7	7	0	24

- Date: November 18
- Location: Ann Arbor, MI
- Game attendance: 105,410

Scoring summary
1		MICH	Ralph Clayton 11-yard pass from Rick Leach (Gregg Willner kick)	MICH 7-0
1		MICH	Willner 32-yard field goal	MICH 10-0
2		MICH	Doug Marsh 10-yard pass from Leach (Willner kick)	MICH 17-0
3		MICH	Lawrence Reid, 5-yard run (Willner kick)	MICH 24-0
4	9:32	PUR	Mark Adamle 10-yard blocked punt return (run failed)	MICH 24-6

On November 18, Michigan defeated Purdue, 24–6, before a crowd of 105,410 at Michigan Stadium. Purdue came into the game undefeated in conference games, and a win against Michigan would have secured the conference championship and a trip to the Rose Bowl. The crowd was the third largest in Michigan Stadium history to that point.

On Michigan's first possession, the Wolverines drove 68 yards, capped by a 11-yard touchdown pass from Rick Leach to Ralph Clayton. On the next possession, Michigan intercepted a pass from Purdue quarterback Mark Herrmann and kicked a field goal for a 10–0 lead. On the next possession, Curtis Greer knocked Hermann to the ground, resulting in a concussion and pinched nerve and preventing Hermann from returning to the game. In the second quarter, Leach threw a 10-yard touchdown pass to Doug Marsh, and in the third quarter, Lawrence Reid ran five yards for Michigan's final touchdown. Purdue did not score against the Michigan defense. However, in the fourth quarter, Purdue's Tom Kingsbury blocked Gregg Willner's punt, and Mark Adamle returned it for a Purdue touchdown with 9:32 left in the game.

Michigan rushed for 343 yards against a defense ranked tenth in the nation in run defense that had allowed an average of only 117.9 rushing yards per game. Overall, the Wolverines out-gained the Boilermakers by 397 yards to 123. Russell Davis led Michigan's backs with 134 yards on 25 carries. The defense held the Boilermakers to only 11 yards in the second quarter and minus four yards in the third quarter.

=== Ohio State ===
Week 11: Michigan at Ohio State

Team	1	2	3	4	Total
• Michigan	7	0	7	0	14
Ohio State	3	0	0	0	3

- Date: November 25
- Location: Columbus, OH
- Game start: 1:00 p.m.
- Game attendance: 88,358
- Game weather: Overcast, 40 °F (4 °C)
- TV announcers (ABC): Chris Schenkel, Ara Parseghian, and Bill Flemming

Scoring summary
1	1:13	MICH	Bob Atha 29-yard field goal, 1:13	OHIO 3-0
1	0:09	MICH	Rodney Feaster 30-yard pass from Rick Leach (Gregg Willner kick)	MICH 7-3
3	4:09	MICH	Roosevelt Smith 11-yard pass from Leach (Willner kick)	MICH 14-3

On November 25, Michigan defeated Ohio State, 14–3, before a record crowd of 88,358 at Ohio Stadium in Columbus, Ohio. Ohio State's Bob Atha kicked a field goal late in the first quarter for the Buckeyes' only score in the game. Michigan responded with a four-play, 70-yard drive that took only 59 seconds off the clock and ended with a 30-yard touchdown pass from Rick Leach to Rodney Feaster.

Late in the second quarter, Ohio State drove to Michigan's 24-yard line when Jerry Meter knocked the ball out of Art Schlichter's hand, and Andy Cannavino recovered for Michigan. After the turnover, the Wolverines drove deep into Ohio State territory, and with seconds remaining in the first half, Leach completed a pass to Gene Johnson at the one-yard line, but Johnson was hit by Vince Skillings and fumbled and Skillings recovered the ball. The first half ended with Michigan leading, 7–3.

Michigan's defense tightened in the second half, limiting the Buckeyes (ranked fifth nationally in scoring offense prior to the game) to only one first down. In the third quarter, Michigan drove 69 yards on 13 plays, capped by an 11-yard touchdown pass from Leach to Roosevelt Smith. With 3:15 remaining in the game, Mike Jolly intercepted Schlichter's pass near midfield as the Buckeyes tried to mount a comeback. Michigan's players carried coach Schembechler off the field after the game.

Leach was selected by the ABC broadcast crew as the Chevrolet Offensive Player of the Game. Leach sustained a hamstring injury in the second quarter, but completed 11 of 21 passes for 166 yards and two touchdowns. The Wolverines out-gained the Buckeyes by 364 yards to 216. Roosevelt Smith led Michigan's backs with 67 rushing yards on 10 carries. Ohio State quarterback Art Schlichter completed only four of nine passes for 43 yards. Ron Springs led the Buckeyes' ground attack with 63 yards on 12 carries.

In a post-game press conference, coach Schembechler called it "the greatest game we've ever won" and declared Leach to be "the best football player in the United States of America" and "the greatest football player I have ever been associated with." Woody Hayes, in his post-game press conference, became enraged when a columnist from the Chicago Tribune asked if he was aware that his teams had not scored a touchdown against Michigan in the last three games. Hayes approached the columnist in a menacing manner, screamed that he had "no respect" for the columnist, and stormed out of the briefing room.

=== Rose Bowl ===
Rose Bowl: Michigan vs. USC

Team	1	2	3	4	Total
Michigan	0	3	7	0	10
• USC	7	10	0	0	17

- Date: January 1, 1979
- Location: Pasadena, CA
- Game attendance: 105,629
- TV announcers (NBC): Curt Gowdy, John Brodie, and O. J. Simpson

Scoring summary
Q1	10:47	USC	Hoby Brenner 9-yard pass from Paul McDonald (Frank Jordan kick)	USC 7–0
Q2		MICH	Gregg Willner 36-yard field goal	USC 7–3
Q2		USC	Charles White 3-yard run (Jordan kick).	USC 14–3
Q2	0:00	USC	Jordan 35-yard field goal	UW 17–3
Q3		MICH	R. Smith 44-yard pass from Rick Leach (Willner kick)	UW 17–10

On January 1, 1979, No. 5 Michigan lost by a 17–10 score to No. 3 USC before a crowd of 105,629 in the 1979 Rose Bowl at Pasadena, California.

On Michigan's second play from scrimmage, USC defensive back Ronnie Lott intercepted a Rick Leach pass near midfield and returned it to Michigan's 16-yard line. USC took advantage of the turnover, scoring on a nine-yard touchdown pass from quarterback Paul McDonald to Hoby Brenner.

Near the end of the first quarter, Michigan linebacker Tom Seabron hit from McDonald's blind side, causing a fumble that was recovered by Michigan's Dale Keitz at USC's 23-yard line. Michigan was unable to convert a touchdown and settled for a 36-yard field goal by Gregg Willner.

Michigan's defense held USC to less than 10 yards in the first quarter. USC finally mounted a 50-yard drive late in the second quarter. The drive ended with one of the most controversial plays in Rose Bowl history. On a run from Michigan's three-yard line, Michigan linebacker Ron Simpkins stripped the ball from the arms of USC running back Charles White before he crossed the goal line, and Michigan fell on the loose ball at the one-yard line. The umpire ruled that White had fumbled and that it was Michigan's ball. However, the line judge ruled that White had crossed the goal line before fumbling, and the touchdown was counted. Television replays clearly showed that White had fumbled at the one-yard line and had crossed the goal line without the ball. White's empty-handed touchdown became known as the "phantom touchdown".

With less than 20 second remaining in the first half, Leach threw a pass downfield that was intercepted by Dennis Smith and returned to the Michigan 31-yard line. USC kicked a 35-yard field goal as the half ran out to extend its lead to 17–3.

Midway through the third quarter, Leach scrambled to avoid a sack and threw a 44-yard touchdown to Roosevelt Smith. Neither team was able to score in the remaining 25 minutes.

In a game marked by strong defensive play by both teams, Michigan held USC to 23 passing yards, 134 rushing yards (including 99 by Charles White), and 14 first downs. In his final game for Michigan, Leach completed 10 of 21 passes for 137 yards, though his two interceptions led to 10 points for USC. After its victory in the Rose Bowl, USC was declared the national champion in the UPI Poll.

=== Award season ===
After the 1978 season, quarterback Rick Leach received multiple awards and honors, including the following:

- He won the Chicago Tribune Silver Football trophy as the most valuable player in the Big Ten Conference.
- He tied with Chuck Fusina as the first-team quarterback on the 1978 College Football All-America Team selected by the American Football Coaches Association.
- He was selected by both the Associated Press (media) and United Press International (coaches) as the first-team quarterback on the 1978 All-Big Ten Conference football team.
- He finished third in balloting for the Heisman Trophy, behind Billy Sims and Chuck Fusina.
- He was selected as the co-Most Valuable Player (along with Charles White) of the 1979 Rose Bowl, his last game as a Wolverine.

In addition to Leach, seven other Michigan players received first-team honors on the 1978 All-Big Ten Conference football team. They were: fullback Russell Davis (AP-1, UPI-1), guard John Arbeznik (AP-2, UPI-1), offensive tackle Jon Giesler (AP-1, UPI-1), defensive tackle Curtis Greer (AP-1, UPI-1), linebacker Ron Simpkins (AP-1, UPI_2), and defensive backs Mike Jolly (AP-1, UPI-1) and Mike Harden (UPI-1).

Team awards were presented as follows:

- Most Valuable Player: Rick Leach
- Meyer Morton Award: Gene Johnson
- John Maulbetsch Award: Mike Trgovac
- Frederick Matthei Award: Mike Jolly
- Arthur Robinson Scholarship Award: Mark DeSantis

== Personnel ==
=== Full roster ===
1978 Michigan Wolverines football team roster
Players
Coaches
Offense

Pos.	#	Name	Class
G	64	John Arbeznik	Sr
WB	22	Ralph Clayton	Jr
FB	33	Russell Davis (C)	Sr
WR	18	Rodney Feaster	So
OT	68	Jon Giesler	Sr
RB	25	Harlan Huckleby	Sr
QB	7	Rick Leach	Sr
TE	80	Doug Marsh	Jr
RB	26	Roosevelt Smith	Jr

Defense

Pos.	#	Name	Class
DT	95	Curtis Greer
OLB	46	Jerry Meter (C)

Special teams

Pos.	#	Name	Class
K, P	1	Gregg Willner

Head coach

- Bo Schembechler

Coordinators/assistant coaches

- Bill McCartney (defensive coordinator)
- Dennis Brown (defensive ends)
- Tirrel Burton (offensive ends)
- Jerry Hanlon (offensive line)
- Jack Harbaugh (defensive backfield)
- Don Nehlen (offensive backfield)
- Paul Schudel (offensive interior line)
- Milan Vooletich (defensive line)

Legend

- (C) Team captain
- (S) Suspended
- (I) Ineligible
- Injured
- Redshirt

=== Offensive letter winners ===
- John Arbeznik, offensive guard, senior, University Heights, Ohio – started 9 games at left offensive guard
- Greg Bartnick, offensive guard, senior, Detroit – started all 12 games at right offensive guard
- Kurt Becker, offensive guard, sophomore, Aurora, Illinois
- Jim Breaugh, quarterback, sophomore, West Bloomfield, Michigan
- David Brewster, fullback, freshman, Grafton, Wisconsin
- Ralph Clayton, wing back, junior, Detroit - started 10 games at wingback
- Russell Davis, fullback, senior, Woodbridge, Virginia - started all 12 games at fullback
- Michael Davis, fullback, junior, Woodbridge, Virginia
- B. J. Dickey, quarterback, sophomore, Ottawa, Ohio
- Bill Dufek, offensive tackle, senior, East Grand Rapids, Michigan – started 3 games at right offensive tackle
- Stanley Edwards, tailback, sophomore, Detroit
- Rodney Feaster, wide receiver, sophomore, Flint, Michigan - started 7 games at wide receiver
- Jon Giesler, offensive tackle, senior, Woodville, Ohio – started all 12 games at left offensive tackle
- Harlan Huckleby, tailback, senior, Detroit - started 9 games at tailback
- Jim Humphries, middle guard, junior, Detroit
- Gene Johnson, tight end, senior, Flint, Michigan – started 7 games at tight end, 1 game at wide receiver
- Ed Kasparek, wide receiver, senior, Dearborn, Michigan – started 1 game at wide receiver
- Rick Leach, quarterback, senior, Flint, Michigan - started all 12 games at quarterback
- Gary Lee, quarterback, freshman, Flint, Michigan
- Mike Leoni, offensive tackle, junior, Flint, Michigan – started 5 games at right offensive tackle
- Tony Leoni, tailback, junior, Flint, Michigan
- George Lilja, center, junior, Palos Park, Illinois
- Rock Lindsay, offensive guard, senior, Lapeer, Michigan
- Doug Marsh, tight end, junior, Akron, Ohio – started 5 games at tight end
- Jerry Meter, outside linebacker, senior, Bloomfield Hills, Michigan - started all 12 games at outside linebacker
- Alan Mitchell, wide receiver, sophomore, Detroit – started 3 games at wide receiver, 1 game at wing back
- Steve Nauta, center, senior, Norristown, Pennsylvania – started all 12 games at center
- Craig Page, tailback, senior, Saginaw, Michigan
- Bubba Paris, offensive tackle, freshman, Louisville, Kentucky – started 1 game at right offensive tackle
- Bernhardt "Chip" Pederson, tight end, senior, Bay City, Michigan
- John J. Powers, offensive guard, junior, Oak Park, Illinois – started 3 games at left offensive guard, 3 games at right offensive tackle
- Lawrence P. Reid, fullback, junior, Philadelphia
- Mark Schmerge, tight end, senior, Cincinnati
- Kevin Smith, quarterback – free safety, freshman, Dallas
- Roosevelt Smith, tailback, junior, Detroit, Michigan – started 1 game at wing back, 1 game at tailback
- John Wangler, quarterback, junior, Royal Oak, Michigan
- Butch Woolfolk, tailback, freshman, Westfield, New Jersey – started 2 games at tailback

=== Defensive letter winners ===
- Gene Bell, safety, junior, East Liverpool, Ohio
- Norm Betts, outside linebacker – tight end, freshman, Midland, Michigan
- Mark Braman, defensive back, senior, Midland, Michigan – started 10 games at strong-side cornerback
- Gasper Calandrino, defensive back, senior, Grand Rapids, Michigan
- Andy Cannavino, inside linebacker, sophomore, Cleveland, Ohio – started 6 games at inside linebacker
- Mark DeSantis, outside linebacker, senior, Harper Woods, Michigan – started 4 games at inside linebacker
- Gerald Diggs, defensive back, junior, Chicago – started 1 game at strong-side cornerback
- Chris Godfrey, defensive tackle, junior, Detroit – started 6 games at defensive tackle
- Curtis Greer, defensive tackle, senior, Detroit - started all 12 games at defensive tackle
- Mike Harden, defensive back, junior, Detroit, Michigan – started 10 games at safety
- Stuart Harris, defensive back, sophomore, Chagrin Falls, Ohio – started 2 games at safety
- Robert K. Holloway, outside linebacker, senior, West Bloomfield, Michigan
- James N. Humphries, middle guard, junior, Detroit
- Tony Jackson, defensive back, freshman, Cleveland, Ohio
- William Jackson, defensive tackle, senior, Richmond, Virginia
- Mike Jolly, defensive back, junior, Melvindale, Michigan - started all 12 games at weak side cornerback
- Dale Keitz, middle guard – defensive tackle, senior, Columbus, Ohio – started all 12 games (6 at middle guard, 6 at defensive tackle)
- Tom Keller, outside linebacker, junior, Grand Rapids, Michigan
- Timothy Malinak, inside linebacker, senior, Flemington, Pennsylvania
- Thomas A. Melita, middle guard, senior, Penns Grove, New Jersey
- Dan Murray, wolf, junior, Ann Arbor, Michigan – started 1 game at strong-side cornerback
- Ben Needham, outside linebacker, sophomore, Groveport, Ohio – started 2 games at outside linebacker
- Mel Owens, inside linebacker, junior, DeKalb, Illinois – started 2 games at inside linebacker
- Tom Seabron, outside linebacker, senior, Detroit – started 10 games at outside linebacker
- Ron Simpkins, inside linebacker, junior, Detroit – started 11 games at inside linebacker
- Mike Trgovac, middle guard, sophomore, Austintown, Ohio – started 6 games at middle guard
- Gary Weber, defensive tackle, junior, Matawan, New Jersey

=== Kickers ===
- Bryan Virgil, place-kicker, sophomore, Buchanan, Michigan
- Gregg Willner, punter/place-kicker, senior, Miami Beach, Florida

=== Coaching staff ===
- Head coach: Bo Schembechler
- Assistant coaches:

- Bill McCartney - defensive coordinator
- Dennis Brown - defensive ends coach
- Tirrel Burton - offensive end coach
- Jerry Hanlon - offensive line coach
- Jack Harbaugh - defensive backfield coach
- Don Nehlen - offensive backfield coach
- Paul Schudel - offensive interior line coach
- Milan Vooletich - defensive line coach

- Trainer: Lindsy McLean
- Manager: Nicholas J. Uriah

== Statistics ==
=== Offensive statistics ===
==== Rushing ====
Player	Att	Net Yards	Yds/Att	TD
Harlan Huckleby	154	741	4.8	5
Russell Davis	153	683	4.5	3
Rick Leach	145	611	4.2	12
Roosevelt Smith	98	410	4.2	3
Butch Woolfolk	78	370	4.7	2
Lawrence Reid	50	209	4.2	2

==== Passing ====
Player	Att	Comp	Int	Comp %	Yds	Yds/Comp	TD
Rick Leach	158	78	6	49.4	1,283	16.4	17
B. J. Dickey	19	8	0	42.1	115	14.4	2

==== Receiving ====
Player	Recp	Yds	Yds/Recp	TD
Ralph Clayton	25	546	21.8	8
Doug Marsh	19	283	14.9	6
Roosevelt Smith	9	115	12.8	3
Alan Mitchell	5	101	20.2	1

=== Special teams statistics ===
==== Kicking ====
Player	PATA	PATM	Percent	FGA	FGM	Percent	Punts	Punt Yds	Avg	Points
Gregg Willner	48	47	97.9	13	7	53.8	54	2,139	39.6	68
