= Jon Giesler =

American football player (born 1956)

No. 79
- Position: Offensive tackle

Personal information
- Born: December 23, 1956 (age 69); Toledo, Ohio, U.S.
- Listed height: 6 ft 5 in (1.96 m)
- Listed weight: 262 lb (119 kg)

Career information
- High school: Woodmore (Elmore, Ohio)
- College: Michigan
- NFL draft: 1979: 1st round, 24th overall pick

Career history
- Miami Dolphins (1979–1989)

Awards and highlights
- First-team All-Big Ten (1978); 2× Second-team All-AFC (1984, 1986)

Career NFL statistics
- Games: 126
- Games started: 105
- Fumble recoveries: 2
- Stats at Pro Football Reference

Jon William Giesler (born December 23, 1956) is an American former professional football player for the Miami Dolphins of the National Football League (NFL). He played 10 seasons, principally at the offensive left tackle position, for the Dolphins from 1979 to 1988. He played college football at the University of Michigan from 1975 to 1978.

== Early life ==
Giesler was born in Toledo, Ohio, in 1956. He grew up in Woodville, Ohio, a town of approximately 2,000 people, located 30 minutes southeast of Toledo. He attended Woodmore High School in Elmore, Ohio. He played for the football and track teams and won the Ohio state championship in the shot put.

== University of Michigan ==
In 1975, Giesler enrolled at the University of Michigan where he played college football for head coach Bo Schembechler's Michigan Wolverines football teams from 1975 to 1978. Giesler began his career as a defensive tackle but was converted to an offensive tackle as a junior. During his junior year, Giesler was a backup to Mike Kenn at the offensive left tackle position and started two games for the 1977 Michigan Wolverines football team.

As a senior, Giesler started all 12 games at left tackle for the 1978 Michigan Wolverines football team that compiled a 10–1 regular season record, won the Big Ten Conference championship, and lost to USC in the 1979 Rose Bowl. Led by Giesler and John Arbeznik, Michigan's 1978 offensive line led the way for Harlan Huckleby, Russell Davis, Rick Leach and others to tally 3,241 rushing yards (294.6 yards per game). At the end of the 1978 season, Giesler was selected as a first-team offensive tackle on the 1978 All-Big Ten Conference football team.

== Professional football ==
Giesler was selected by the Miami Dolphins in the first round as the 24th overall pick in the 1979 NFL draft. As a rookie during the 1979 NFL season, Giesler did not start any games for the Dolphins, played on special teams and was also a backup to veteran linemen Bob Kuechenberg and Mike Current.

When Current retired after the 1979 season, Giesler became a starter for the Dolphins at the left tackle position during the 1980 NFL season. Between 1980 and 1988, Giesler appeared in 110 games for the Dolphins, 105 of them as the starting left tackle. In June 1984, Giesler rejected an offer to play for the Michigan Panthers in the United States Football League (USFL) for a reported $900,000 over three years. During the 1984 season, Giesler played on the best pass-blocking line in the NFL, and Dolphins' coach Don Shula rated Giesler as "his steadiest offensive lineman." In 1986, Giesler missed the first six games of the season after undergoing knee surgery and then injured the knee again late in the season, limiting his playing time to a career-low seven games during the 1986 NFL season. Giesler considered retiring prior to the 1988 season and conducted a two-month holdout before signing a two-year contract with the Dolphins for a reported $657,500.

In 10 seasons with the Dolphins from 1979 to 1988, Giesler played in two Super Bowls (Super Bowl XVII and Super Bowl XIX) and was twice selected by the United Press International (UPI) as a second-team All-AFC player. He appeared in a total of 126 regular season NFL games.

== Later life ==
Following his retirement from the NFL at the conclusion of the 1988 season, Giesler remained in Florida where he owns a chain of restaurants.
