= 1978 Purdue Boilermakers football team =

American college football season

1978 Purdue Boilermakers football

Peach Bowl champion

Peach Bowl, W 41–21 vs. Georgia Tech
- Conference: Big Ten Conference

Ranking
- Coaches: No. 13
- AP: No. 13
- Record: 9–2–1 (6–1–1 Big Ten)
- Head coach: Jim Young (2nd season)
- Defensive coordinator: Leon Burtnett (2nd season)
- MVP: Keena Turner
- Captains: Tim Eubank; Willie Harris
- Home stadium: Ross–Ade Stadium

1978 Big Ten Conference football standings
	Conf.					Overall
Team	W		L		T	W		L		T
No. 5 Michigan +	7	–	1	–	0	10	–	2	–	0
No. 12 Michigan State +	7	–	1	–	0	8	–	3	–	0
No. 13 Purdue	6	–	1	–	1	9	–	2	–	1
Ohio State	6	–	2	–	0	7	–	4	–	1
Minnesota	4	–	4	–	0	5	–	6	–	0
Wisconsin	3	–	4	–	2	5	–	4	–	2
Indiana	3	–	5	–	0	4	–	7	–	0
Iowa	2	–	6	–	0	2	–	9	–	0
Illinois	0	–	6	–	2	1	–	8	–	2
Northwestern	0	–	8	–	1	0	–	10	–	1
+ – Conference co-champions; Rankings from AP Poll

The 1978 Purdue Boilermakers football team represented Purdue University in the 1978 Big Ten Conference football season. Led by second-year head coach Jim Young, the Boilermakers compiled an overall record of 9–2–1 with a mark of 6–1–1 in conference play, placing third in the Big Ten. Purdue was invited to the Peach Bowl, where the Boilermakers defeated Georgia Tech. The team played home games at Ross–Ade Stadium in West Lafayette, Indiana.

== Schedule ==
Date	Opponent	Rank	Site	TV	Result	Attendance	Source
September 16	Michigan State		Ross–Ade Stadium; West Lafayette, IN		W 21–14	60,355	
September 23	Ohio*		Ross–Ade Stadium; West Lafayette, IN		W 24–0	55,172	
September 30	at Notre Dame*		Notre Dame Stadium; Notre Dame, IN (rivalry)		L 6–10	59,075	
October 7	Wake Forest*		Ross–Ade Stadium; West Lafayette, IN		W 14–7	54,362	
October 14	No. 16 Ohio State		Ross–Ade Stadium; West Lafayette, IN		W 27–16	69,465	
October 21	at Illinois	No. 19	Memorial Stadium; Champaign, IL (rivalry)		W 13–0	50,918	
October 28	at Iowa	No. 17	Kinnick Stadium; Iowa City, IA		W 34–7	57,640	
November 4	Northwestern^{†}	No. 14	Ross–Ade Stadium; West Lafayette, IN		W 31–0	64,232	
November 11	at Wisconsin	No. 12	Camp Randall Stadium; Madison, WI		T 24–24	78,986	
November 18	at No. 7 Michigan	No. 15	Michigan Stadium; Ann Arbor, MI		L 6–24	106,410	
November 25	Indiana	No. 18	Ross–Ade Stadium; West Lafayette, IN		W 20–7	69,918	
December 25	vs. Georgia Tech	No. 17	Atlanta–Fulton County Stadium; Atlanta, GA (Peach Bowl)	CBS	W 41–21	20,277	
*Non-conference game; ^{†}Homecoming; Rankings from AP Poll released prior to the game

== Game summaries ==
=== Michigan State ===
Team	1	2	3	4	Total
Michigan State	14	0	0	0	14
• Purdue	0	0	14	7	21

- Date: September 16
- Location: Ross–Ade Stadium, West Lafayette, IN
- Game attendance: 60,355

Scoring summary
1	MSU	Kirk Gibson 4 yard pass from Ed Smith (Morten Andersen kick)	MSU 7-0
1	MSU	Ed Smith 3 yard run (Morten Andersen kick)	MSU 14-0
3	PUR	Dave Young 1 yard pass from Mark Herrmann (Scott Sovereen kick)	MSU 14-7
3	PUR	Russell Pope 62 yard run (Scott Sovereen kick)	Tied 14-14
4	PUR	John Macon 33 yard run (Scott Sovereen kick)	PUR 21-14

- John Macon 19 rushes, 120 yards

=== Ohio State ===
Team	1	2	3	4	Total
Ohio St	0	7	3	6	16
• Purdue	3	0	14	10	27

- Date: October 14
- Location: Ross–Ade Stadium, West Lafayette, IN
- Game attendance: 69,465

Scoring summary
Q1	PUR	Sovereen 28 yard field goal	PUR 3–0
Q2	OHST	Volley 49 yard run (Janakievski kick)	OHST 7–3
Q3	PUR	Macon 1 yard run (Sovereen kick)	PUR 10–7
Q3	OHST	Atha 42 yard field goal	Tie 10–10
Q3	PUR	Pope 11 yard run (Sovereen kick)	PUR 17–10
Q4	PUR	Sovereen 41 yard field goal	PUR 20–10
Q4	OHST	Gerald 60 yard pass from Schlichter (pass failed)	PUR 20–16
Q4	PUR	Harris 19 yard pass from Herrmann (Sovereen kick)	PUR 27–16

=== At Illinois ===
- John Macon 32 rushes, 126 yards
- Russell Pope 25 rushes, 118 yards

=== At Iowa ===
Team	1	2	3	4	Total
• Purdue	10	7	0	17	34
Iowa	0	0	7	0	7

- Date: October 28
- Location: Kinnick Stadium, Iowa City, Iowa
- Game attendance: 57,460

Scoring summary
1	PUR	Sovereen 39 yard field goal	Purdue 3–0
1	PUR	Pope 11 yard run (Sovereen kick)	Purdue 10–0
2	PUR	Young 25 yard pass from Herrmann (Sovereen kick)	Purdue 17–0
3	IOWA	Reid 57 yard run (Schilling kick)	Purdue 17–7
4	PUR	Burrell 11 yard pass from Herrmann (Sovereen kick)	Purdue 24–7
4	PUR	Sovereen 27 yard field goal	Purdue 27–7
4	PUR	Eubank 3 yard pass from Herrmann (Sovereen kick)	Purdue 34–7

=== At Wisconsin ===
- John Macon 32 rushes, 117 yards

=== Indiana ===
- Mike Augustyniak 23 rushes, 135 yards

== Personnel ==
1978 Purdue Boilermakers football team roster
Players
Coaches
Offense

Pos.	#	Name	Class
RB		Mike Augustyniak
QB		Steve Barr
WR		Bart Burrell
RB		Frank Doria
TE		Tim Eubank
OT		Henry Fiel
WR		Tony Gallivan
RB		Labraunt Harris
WR		Mike Harris
G		John LeFeber
QB	9	Mark Herrmann	So
RB		Wally Jones
RB		Ron Keith
TE		Neil Lucklanow
FB		John Macon
RB		Don McAfee
RB		Ben McCall
OT		Steve McKenzie
RB		Jim Meyer
QB		Chuck Oliver
RB		Russell Pope
RB		Robert Pruitt
C		Pete Quinn
RB		Dwight Robinson
G		Dale Schwan
WR		Ray Smith
RB		Robert Williams
TE		Dave Young

Defense

Pos.	#	Name	Class
DT		Calvin Clark
DE		Ruben Floyd
S		Willie Harris
DT		Marcus Jackson
LB		Mark Johnason
MG		Ken Loushin
LB		Mike Marks
CB		Rick Moss
LB		Kevin Motts
CB		Wayne Smith
S		Rock Supan
DE		Keena Turner

Special teams

Pos.	#	Name	Class
P		Dave Eagin
P		Joe Linville
K		Scott Sovereen

Head coach

- Jim Young

Coordinators/assistant coaches

- Bob Bockrath
- Leon Burtnett
- Mike Hankwitz
- Randy Hart
- Doug Redmann
- Bob Spoo
- Larry Thompson
- Ed Zaunbrecher

Legend

- (C) Team captain
- (S) Suspended
- (I) Ineligible
- Injured
- Redshirt

== Awards ==
All-Big Ten

- Ken Loushin (1st)
- Keena Turner (1st)
- Mark Herrmann (2nd)
- Marcus Jackson (2nd)
- John LeFeber (2nd)
- John Macon (2nd)
- Steve McKenzie (2nd)
- Dale Schwan (2nd)
- Scott Sovereen (2nd)

Big Ten Coach of the Year: Jim Young

== Statistics ==
=== Passing ===
Player	Comp	Att	Yards	TD	INT
Herrmann	152	274	1,904	14	12
