= 1978 Michigan State Spartans football team =

American college football season

1978 Michigan State Spartans football

Big Ten co-champion
- Conference: Big Ten Conference

Ranking
- AP: No. 12
- Record: 8–3 (7–1 Big Ten)
- Head coach: Darryl Rogers (3rd season)
- Defensive coordinator: George Dyer (1st season)
- MVP: Ed Smith
- Captains: Mel Land; Ed Smith
- Home stadium: Spartan Stadium

1978 Big Ten Conference football standings
	Conf.					Overall
Team	W		L		T	W		L		T
No. 5 Michigan +	7	–	1	–	0	10	–	2	–	0
No. 12 Michigan State +	7	–	1	–	0	8	–	3	–	0
No. 13 Purdue	6	–	1	–	1	9	–	2	–	1
Ohio State	6	–	2	–	0	7	–	4	–	1
Minnesota	4	–	4	–	0	5	–	6	–	0
Wisconsin	3	–	4	–	2	5	–	4	–	2
Indiana	3	–	5	–	0	4	–	7	–	0
Iowa	2	–	6	–	0	2	–	9	–	0
Illinois	0	–	6	–	2	1	–	8	–	2
Northwestern	0	–	8	–	1	0	–	10	–	1
+ – Conference co-champions; Rankings from AP Poll

The 1978 Michigan State Spartans football team was an American football team that represented Michigan State University as a member of the Big Ten Conference during the 1978 Big Ten football season. In their third season under head coach Darryl Rogers, the Spartans compiled an 8–3 record (7–1 in conference games), tied with Michigan for the Big Ten championship, and outscored opponents by a total of 411 to 170. After losing three of their first four games, they defeated No. 5 Michigan and won their final seven games. They were ranked No. 12 in the final AP poll. The Michigan State football program was placed on three years of probation in January 1976 and was therefore ineligible to be included in the 1978 UPI coaches poll or to play in a bowl game after the 1978 season.

On offense, the Spartans gained an average of 242.1 rushing yards and 239.2 passing yards per game. On defense, they gave up 165.8 rushing yards and 125.5 passing yards per game. The individual statistical leaders included quarterback Ed Smith with 2,226 passing yards and 20 passing touchdowns (both tops in the Big Ten), Steve Smith with 772 rushing yards, flanker Kirk Gibson with 802 receiving yards (tops in the Big Ten), and kicker Morten Andersen with 73 points scored (52 of 54 extra points, 7 of 16 field goals). Smith was selected as the team's most valuable player; he finished his collegiate career as the Big Ten's all-time leader with 5,706 passing yards.

Ten Spartans were selected by either the Associated Press (AP) or the United Press International (UPI) as first- or second-team players on the 1978 All-Big Ten Conference football teams: flanker Kirk Gibson (AP-1, UPI-1); split end Eugene Byrd (AP-1, UPI-1); tight end Mark Brammer (AP-1, UPI-1); offensive tackle Jim Hinsley (AP-1, UPI-1); defensive lineman Melvin Land (AP-1, UPI-1); defensive back Tom Graves (AP-1, UPI-1); punter Ray Stachowicz (AP-2, UPI-1); quarterback Ed Smith (AP-2, UPI-2); safety Mark Anderson (AP-2, UPI-2); and linebacker Dan Bass (AP-2).

The team played its home games at Spartan Stadium in East Lansing, Michigan.

== Schedule ==
Date	Opponent	Rank	Site	Result	Attendance	Source
September 16	at Purdue		Ross–Ade Stadium; West Lafayette, IN	L 14–21	60,365	
September 23	Syracuse*		Spartan Stadium; East Lansing, MI	W 49–21	74,511	
September 29	at No. 3 USC*		Los Angeles Memorial Coliseum; Los Angeles, CA	L 9–30	65,319	
October 7	Notre Dame*		Spartan Stadium; East Lansing, MI (rivalry)	L 25–29	77,087	
October 14	at No. 5 Michigan		Michigan Stadium; Ann Arbor, MI (rivalry)	W 24–15	105,132	
October 21	Indiana^{†}		Spartan Stadium; East Lansing, MI (rivalry)	W 49–14	76,013	
October 28	Wisconsin		Spartan Stadium; East Lansing, MI	W 55–2	70,114	
November 4	at Illinois	No. 18	Memorial Stadium; Champaign, IL	W 59–19	48,077	
November 11	Minnesota	No. 17	Spartan Stadium; East Lansing, MI	W 33–9	72,122	
November 18	at Northwestern	No. 16	Dyche Stadium; Evanston, IL	W 52–3	14,157	
November 25	Iowa	No. 14	Spartan Stadium; East Lansing, MI	W 42–7	57,007	
*Non-conference game; ^{†}Homecoming; Rankings from AP Poll released prior to the game

== Roster ==
1978 Michigan State Spartans football team roster
Players
Coaches
Offense

Pos.	#	Name	Class
TE	91	Mark Brammer	Jr
OT	53	Angelo Fields	Jr
QB		Ed Smith	Jr
WR	23	Kirk Gibson	Sr
G		James "Jody" McCulloh

Defense

Pos.	#	Name	Class
DB	16	Mark Anderson	Jr
LB	57	Larry Savage

Special teams

Pos.	#	Name	Class
P	19	Ray Stachowicz	So

Head coach

Coordinators/assistant coaches

- Dan Underwood

Legend

- (C) Team captain
- (S) Suspended
- (I) Ineligible
- Injured
- Redshirt

- Jon-Erik Hexum actor known for accidentally fatally shooting himself on the set of Cover Up.
