= Ralph Clayton =

American football player (born 1958)

No. 22, 86
- Positions: Wingback, Wide receiver

Personal information
- Born: September 29, 1958 (age 68); Highland Park, Michigan, U.S.
- Listed height: 6 ft 3 in (1.91 m)
- Listed weight: 222 lb (101 kg)

Career information
- High school: Redford (Detroit, Michigan)
- College: Michigan
- NFL draft: 1980: 2nd round, 47th overall pick

Career history
- New York Jets (1980)*; St. Louis Cardinals (1981)
- * Offseason or practice squad member only

Awards and highlights
- Second-team All-Big Ten (1978)

Career NFL statistics
- Games played: 7
- Stats at Pro Football Reference

Ralph Darrell Clayton (born September 29, 1958) is an American former professional football player who was a wide receiver for the St. Louis Cardinals of the National Football League (NFL). A native of Detroit, Michigan, Clayton played college football as a "wingback" for the University of Michigan from 1976 to 1979 and was the leading receiver for the Michigan Wolverines football team in both 1977 and 1978. After being selected by the New York Jets in the second round of the 1980 NFL draft, Clayton missed the 1980 NFL season due to injury. He later signed with St. Louis and appeared in seven games for the Cardinals during the 1981 NFL season.

== Early life ==
Clayton was born in Highland Park, Michigan, in 1958. He attended Redford High School in Detroit.

== University of Michigan ==
Clayton enrolled at the University of Michigan in 1976 and played college football as a "wingback" for head coach Bo Schembechler's Michigan Wolverines football teams from 1976 to 1979. As a freshman in 1976, Clayton was listed as a "junior varsity" player, though he did appear in six games for the Wolverines as a backup running back and compiled 52 rushing yards on nine carries and 13 receiving yards on two catches.

=== 1977 season ===
As a sophomore, Clayton started eight games at the wingback position for the 1977 Michigan Wolverines football team that compiled a 10-2 record, tied for the Big Ten Conference championship, and outscored opponents 353 to 124. In the fourth game of the season, Clayton caught three passes for 99 yards, leading some to compare him to Michigan's recently graduated All-American receiver Jim Smith. Clayton also led all Michigan receivers with five catches for 84 yards in a 27-20 loss to Washington in the 1978 Rose Bowl. Teamed with Rick Leach as Michigan's quarterback, Clayton was Michigan's leading receiver in 1977 with 24 receptions for 477 yards and two touchdowns.

=== 1978 season ===
As a junior, Clayton started 10 games at wingback for the 1978 Michigan team that again compiled a 10-2 record, tied for the Big Ten championship and outscored opponents 372 to 106. On October 21, 1978, in a 42-0 victory over Wisconsin, Clayton scored two touchdowns, one on a 27-yard run and the other on a 65-yard reception from Rick Leach. Three weeks later, Clayton caught five passes for a career-high 122 receiving yards and two touchdowns in a 59-14 victory over Northwestern. For the second consecutive year, Clayton was Michigan's leading receiver, totaling 25 receptions for 546 yards and eight touchdowns. Clayton's eight receiving touchdowns in 1978 tied a Michigan school record.

=== 1979 season ===
As a senior, Clayton started all 12 games at wingback for the 1979 Michigan team. On October 6, 1979, Clayton had a career-high 66-yard game-winning touchdown catch from B. J. Dickey in 21-7 victory over Michigan State. In his final game in a Michigan uniform, Clayton had a 50-yard reception from John Wangler in the 1979 Gator Bowl. Clayton finished the season with 16 receptions for 357 yards and one touchdown. While Clayton had led Michigan in receiving in 1977 and 1978 with Rick Leach at quarterback, he finished third in receiving for the 1979 team (behind Doug Marsh and Anthony Carter) with Dickey and Wangler at quarterback.

=== Career statistics ===
In four years at Michigan, Clayton accumulated 67 receptions for 1,393 yards and 11 touchdowns. When his Michigan career ended, he ranked fourth in career receiving yards and second in career receiving touchdowns. He also served as a kick returner and averaged 20.4 yards for 20 kickoff returns. He carried the ball occasionally and totaled 159 yards on 31 rushes.

== Professional football ==
Clayton was selected by the New York Jets in the second round (47th overall pick) of the 1980 NFL draft. He sustained a stress fracture to the left fibula in August 1980 and did not appear in any regular season games during the 1980 NFL season. He returned to the Jets for pre-season training camp in 1981 but was released in late August 1981. Clayton was then signed by the St. Louis Cardinals and appeared in seven games for the Cardinals during the 1981 NFL season.

== See also ==
- Lists of Michigan Wolverines football receiving leaders
