= Mike Jolly =

American football player (born 1958)

No. 21
- Position: Safety

Personal information
- Born: March 19, 1958 (age 68); Detroit, Michigan, U.S.
- Listed height: 6 ft 3 in (1.91 m)
- Listed weight: 188 lb (85 kg)

Career information
- High school: Aquinas (Detroit)
- College: Michigan
- NFL draft: 1980: 4th round, 96th overall pick

Career history
- New Orleans Saints (1980)*; Green Bay Packers (1980–1983)
- * Offseason or practice squad member only

Awards and highlights
- 2× First-team All-Big Ten (1978, 1979)

Career NFL statistics
- Interceptions: 3
- Fumble recoveries: 1
- Stats at Pro Football Reference

Michael Anthony Joseph Jolly (born March 19, 1958) is an American former professional football player who was a defensive back for the Green Bay Packers of the National Football League (NFL) from 1980 to 1983. He played college football for the Michigan Wolverines from 1976 to 1979. He started at weak side cornerback for Michigan in 35 of 36 games from 1977 to 1979 and was selected as a first-team all-conference player in the Big Ten in both 1978 and 1979.

== Early life ==
Jolly was born in Detroit and grew up in Melvindale, Michigan. He attended Dearborn Sacred Heart High School for three years and one year at Aquinas High School in Southgate Michigan. He played four sports, football, basketball, track and baseball, in high school. He played both tailback and defensive back, and returned punts, in high school.

== Michigan ==
He played at the University of Michigan for the Wolverines football team under head coach Bo Schembechler from 1976 to 1979. As a sophomore in 1977, Jolly started 11 of 12 games for Michigan at the weak side cornerback position. On October 1, 1977, in Michigan's 41–3 victory over Texas A&M, Jolly intercepted a pass and returned it 50 yards for a touchdown. Jolly played in the 1978 Rose Bowl against the Washington Huskies on New Year's Day. In the third quarter of the Rose Bowl, he intercepted a pass at the Washington 36-yard line and returned it 25 yards.

As a junior in 1978, Jolly started all 12 games at weak side cornerback for the 1978 Michigan Wolverines football team and was selected as an All-Big Ten Conference player. In the team's 51–0 victory over Duke, Jolly intercepted two passes. The 1978 team won the Big Ten Conference championship, held opponents to an average of 8.75 points per game, played in the 1979 Rose Bowl, and finished the season ranked No. 5 in both the AP and UPI polls.

As a senior in 1979, and for the second consecutive season, he started all 12 games at the weak side cornerback position. The 1979 Michigan Wolverines football team held opponents to an average of 12.6 points per game, played in the 1979 Gator Bowl and finished the season ranked No. 18 and 19 in the final AP and UPI polls. For the second consecutive season, Jolly was selected as an All-Big Ten Conference player.

Over the three-year period from 1977 to 1979, Jolly started 35 of 36 games for the Wolverines and appeared in two Rose Bowls and a Gator Bowl. In his collegiate career, Jolly totaled 124 tackles and nine interceptions.

== Professional football ==
Jolly was selected by the New Orleans Saints in the fourth round (96th overall pick) of the 1980 NFL draft. In August 1980, Jolly was cut by the Saints and picked up on waivers by the Green Bay Packers.

As a rookie, Jolly appeared in all 16 games as a defensive back for the 1980 Packers. As the fifth back in Green Bay's nickel defense, he had two interceptions and knocked down three passes as a rookie. Jolly was slated to be the Packers starting safety in 1981. During his first game as a starter, a preseason game against the Dallas Cowboys in August 1981, Jolly sustained an injury to his left knee which required surgery to repair ligaments. Jolly missed the entire 1981 season after the injury. He returned for the 1982 season but appeared in only seven games, none as a starter. In 1983, he appeared in 12 games for the Packers, none as a starter.

In May 1984, the Packers released Jolly.
