= Russell Davis (running back) =

American football player (born 1956)

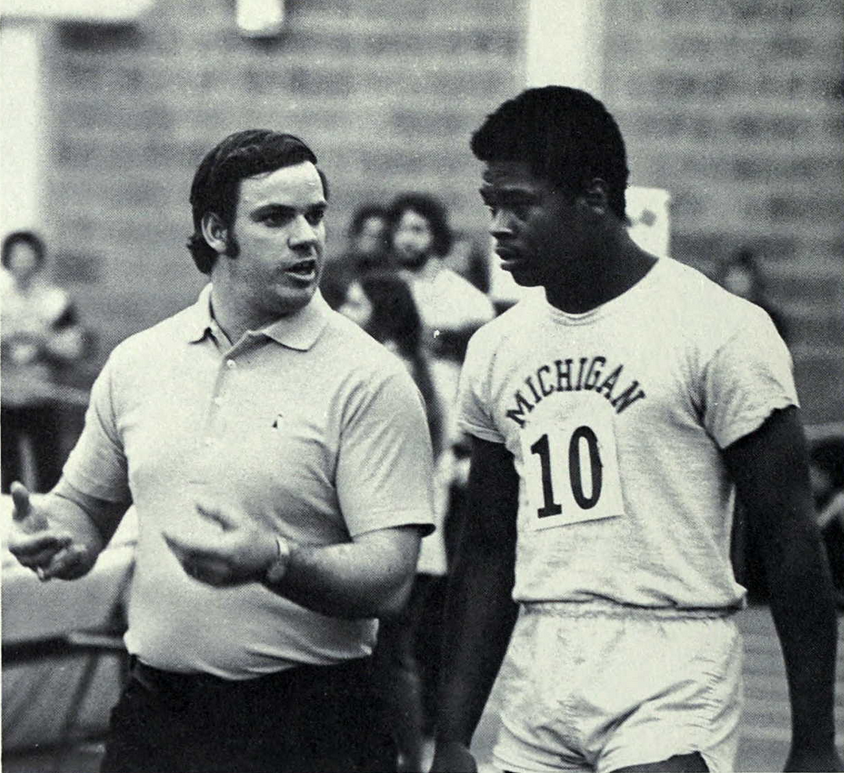
- Davis (right) with track coach Jack Harvey

No. 33, 45
- Position: Fullback

Personal information
- Born: September 15, 1956 (age 70); Millen, Georgia, U.S.
- Listed height: 6 ft 0 in (1.83 m)
- Listed weight: 227 lb (103 kg)

Career information
- High school: Woodbridge (VA)
- College: Michigan (1975–1978)
- NFL draft: 1979: 4th round, 86th overall pick

Career history
- Pittsburgh Steelers (1979–1983)

Awards and highlights
- Super Bowl champion (XIV); First-team All-Big Ten (1978); Second-team All-Big Ten (1977)

Career NFL statistics
- Rushing yards: 474
- Receiving yards: 45
- Kickoff return yards: 168
- Stats at Pro Football Reference

Russell Davis III (born September 15, 1956) is an American former professional football player.

Davis played college football, principally as a fullback, at the University of Michigan from 1975 to 1978. After rushing for 1,092 yards as a junior, he was selected as the Most Valuable Player on the 1977 Michigan Wolverines football team that won the Big Ten Conference championship. As a senior, he was a co-captain of the 1978 Michigan team and a first-team All-Big Ten running back. In four years at Michigan, he carried the ball 523 times for 2,560 yards and 18 touchdowns. He played in the 1979 East–West Shrine Game and set Shrine Game records with six touchdowns and 199 rushing yards.

Davis played as a running back in the National Football League (NFL) for the Pittsburgh Steelers from 1979 to 1983. He appeared in 42 games for the Steelers, only two as a starter, and totaled 472 rushing yards, 168 yards on kickoff returns, and 45 receiving yards.

== Early life ==
Davis was born in Millen, Georgia, in 1956. He began high school at Hayfield High School in Fairfax County, Virginia, but transferred prior to his junior year to Woodbridge High School in Woodbridge, Virginia.

At the start of his junior year, Davis had never played football. Woodbridge's football coach spotted the 6 feet 2, 215 pound track athlete and suggested he try out for the football team. He was an immediate success as a football player. In two years at Woodbridge, he played running back and rushed for 3,399 yards, averaging 9.1 yards per carry.

Davis was one of the most heavily recruited high school football players in Northern Virginia history, with more than 270 scholarship offers, including offers from USC, Alabama, Tennessee, Maryland, North Carolina and Georgia Tech, among others. In February 1975, he committed to the University of Michigan.

== University of Michigan ==
Davis enrolled at the University of Michigan in the fall of 1975 and played college football for head coach Bo Schembechler's Michigan Wolverines football teams from 1975 to 1978.

=== 1975 season ===
As a true freshman, Davis was a backup tailback behind Gordon Bell on the 1975 Michigan Wolverines football team. Davis carried the ball 40 times for 178 rushing yards and two touchdowns and caught two passes for 21 yards in 1975.

=== 1976 season ===
As a sophomore, Davis was moved to the fullback position. He started three games at fullback (Rob Lytle started the other nine) for the 1976 Michigan team that compiled a 10–2 record, outscored opponents 432–95, and finished the season ranked #3 in the final AP Poll. On 105 carries, Davis rushed for 596 yards, five touchdowns, and a career-high 5.7 yards per carry. On September 18, 1976, in a 51–0 victory over Stanford, Davis was one of three Michigan backs who each gained over 100 rushing yards, as Harlan Huckleby gained 157 yards, Davis gained 116 and Rob Lytle added 100 yards.

=== 1977 season ===
Davis had his best season as a junior in 1977. He started all 12 games at fullback and totaled 1,092 rushing yards and eight touchdowns on 225 carries. He also caught 15 passes for 174 yards and a touchdown. Davis was selected as the Most Valuable Player on the 1977 Michigan team that compiled a 10–2 record, tied for the Big Ten championship, and finished the season ranked #9 in the final AP Poll. In the 1978 Rose Bowl loss to Washington Huskies football, Davis had 79 rushing yards, 26 receiving yards and a touchdown.

=== 1978 season ===
As a senior, Davis was selected co-captain of the 1978 Michigan team that again compiled a 10–2 record, repeated as Big Ten co-champions, and finished the season ranked #5 in the final AP Poll. Davis started all 12 games at fullback and rushed for 683 yards on 153 carries. At the end of the 1978 season, he was selected by the conference coaches as a first-team running back on the 1978 All-Big Ten team.

In January 1979, Davis played in the East–West Shrine Game in Palo Alto, California, and rushed for 199 yards scored six touchdowns, including five touchdowns in the second half, as the East team defeated the West team by a 56–17 score. Davis set Shrine Game records both with his six touchdowns and his 199 rushing yards. After the game, Davis said, "I'm going home and rest . . . I'll sit back and watch the rest of them (games) on TV."

=== Career statistics ===
In four years at Michigan, Davis played in three Rose Bowl games, carried the ball 523 times and totaled of 2,550 rushing yards (4.9 yards per carry) and 18 rushing touchdowns. He had five games in which he rushed for at least 100 yards, including a career-high 134 yards against Purdue in 1978.

== Professional football ==
Davis was selected by the Pittsburgh Steelers in the fourth round (86th overall pick) of the 1979 NFL draft. Due to a broken arm, he missed the entire 1979 Pittsburgh Steelers season in which the team won Super Bowl XIV. In 1980, Davis appeared in 14 games for the Steelers, including two games as the team's starting running back. He carried the ball 33 times for 132 yards and a touchdown in 1980. In his second season in the NFL, he carried the ball 47 times for 270 yards and a touchdown, averaging 5.7 yards per carry.

Davis's playing career was cut short by sarcoidosis, a condition that causes lung scarring and a diminished breathing capacity. He saw only limited action as a backup in 1982 and 1983. In four NFL seasons, he appeared in 42 games and totaled 474 rushing yards on 104 carries, two touchdowns and an average of 4.7 yards per carry.

== Family and later years ==
Davis married his high school sweetheart, Brenda. He has two adult children, Loren Parker and Russell Davis IV. Davis moved to Jackson, Michigan, in the mid-1980s. In 1990, he became employed as a truancy officer for the Jackson Public Schools. He became the athletic director for the Jackson Public Schools in 1997 and held that job until 2010 when he retired at age 53 for health reasons. Russell now supports his community through efforts with Iconiq Corvette Club, Lansing, MI.

Davis was one of 4,500 former NFL players to make a claim against the NFL for long-term health problems resulting from their years playing in the league. Davis stated that he could not recall how many concussions he suffered while playing in the NFL, but he recalled one game in which a blow caused him to lose his vision and be hospitalized. He contended that he suffered from progressive memory loss and anxiety as a result of his football injuries. In 2013, the claims were settled upon an agreement to establish a $765 million fund for the benefit of the former players. At the time of the settlement, Davis expressed satisfaction, saying, "The players need help, immediate help. Guys are getting worse."

== See also ==
- Lists of Michigan Wolverines football rushing leaders
