= Rick Venturi =

American football coach (born 1946)

Biographical details
- Born: February 23, 1946 (age 80); Taylorville, Illinois, U.S.

Playing career
- 1965–1967: Northwestern
- Positions: Quarterback, defensive back

Coaching career (HC unless noted)
- 1973–1976: Purdue (assistant)
- 1977: Illinois (DB)
- 1978–1980: Northwestern
- 1981: Hamilton Tiger-Cats (assistant)
- 1982–1983: Baltimore Colts (LB)
- 1984: Indianapolis Colts (DC/LB)
- 1985–1990: Indianapolis Colts (LB)
- 1991: Indianapolis Colts (DC/LB/Interim HC)
- 1992–1993: Indianapolis Colts (DC)
- 1994: Cleveland Browns (DB)
- 1995: Cleveland Browns (DC)
- 1996: New Orleans Saints (LB/Interim HC)
- 1997: New Orleans Saints (Ast. HC/LB)
- 1998: New Orleans Saints (Ast. HC/DB)
- 1999: New Orleans Saints (Ast. HC/LB)
- 2000–2001: New Orleans Saints (Ast. HC/DB)
- 2002–2005: New Orleans Saints (DC)
- 2006–2007: St. Louis Rams (Ast. HC/LB)
- 2008: St. Louis Rams (Ast. HC/LB/DC)

Head coaching record
- Overall: 1–31–1 (college); 2–17 (NFL)

Rick Venturi (born February 23, 1946) is an American former football player, coach, and current broadcaster. He served as the head coach at Northwestern University and as longtime National Football League (NFL) assistant coach known for his defense.

== Biography ==
=== Early years ===
Rick Venturi was born February 23, 1946, in Taylorville, Illinois.

Venturi played quarterback at Rockford Auburn High School in Illinois as a sophomore and junior, and then at Pekin High School for his senior year.

Following graduation he enrolled at Northwestern University in Chicago, where he was a member of the Delta Upsilon fraternity.

=== Coaching career ===
Alumnus Venturi was hired by Northwestern on December 1, 1977, succeeding John Pont, who had announced relinquishing his coaching duties seventeen days prior on November 14 while remaining as the university's athletic director.

Both Pont and Venturi were dismissed on November 18, 1980, after the Wildcats went 1–31–1 (.045) in three seasons, ending with twenty consecutive losses. The losing streak lasted an NCAA Division I-record 34 games, finally broken in 1982. Additionally, all but one of the black players on the football team had protested against the unequal treatment of African-American student athletes within the program.

Venturi was succeeded by Dennis Green one month later on December 23.

After leaving Northwestern, Venturi spent twelve years as an assistant with the Indianapolis Colts, beginning in 1982 when the team was still located in Baltimore. He would eventually rise to defensive coordinator. He also served as defensive coordinator of the Cleveland Browns, New Orleans Saints, and St. Louis Rams.

Venturi also served as interim head coach of the Colts in 1991 and the Saints in 1996, with a career record of 2–17 (.105).

=== Broadcasting career ===
He now serves as the analyst on the Colts Radio Network.

=== Personal life ===
Venturi married the former Cheri Rotello of Rockford, Illinois, with whom he had two children, a boy and a girl.

His late father, Joe Venturi, is a member of the Illinois High School Football Coaches Hall of Fame. Joe coached at Pekin High School in Illinois. His brother, John is also a member of the Illinois High School Football Coaches Hall of Fame. John coached at Washington High School where he won the 1985 Class 4A State Championship. John's 1983 Washington team was the 4A Runner-Up.

== Head coaching record ==
=== College ===
Year	Team	Overall	Conference	Standing	Bowl/playoffs
Northwestern Wildcats (Big Ten Conference) (1978–1980)
1978	Northwestern	0–10–1	0–8–1	10th	
1979	Northwestern	1–10	0–9	10th	
1980	Northwestern	0–11	0–9	10th	
Northwestern:		1–31–1	0–26–1		
Total:		1–31–1			

=== NFL ===
Team	Year	Regular Season					Postseason			
Team	Year	Won	Lost	Ties	Win %	Finish	Won	Lost	Win %	Result
IND*	1991	1	10	0	.091	5th in AFC East	–	–	–	–
IND Total		1	10	0	.091		–	–	–	
NO*	1996	1	7	0	.125	5th in NFC West	–	–	–	–
NO Total		1	7	0	.125		–	–	–	
Total		2	17	0	.105					

* Interim head coach.
