= 1978 Indiana Hoosiers football team =

American college football season

1978 Indiana Hoosiers football
- Conference: Big Ten Conference
- Record: 4–7 (3–5 Big Ten)
- Head coach: Lee Corso (6th season)
- MVP: Joe Norman
- Captains: Dave Abrams; Scott Arnett; Mark Heidel; Joe Norman
- Home stadium: Memorial Stadium

1978 Big Ten Conference football standings
	Conf.					Overall
Team	W		L		T	W		L		T
No. 5 Michigan +	7	–	1	–	0	10	–	2	–	0
No. 12 Michigan State +	7	–	1	–	0	8	–	3	–	0
No. 13 Purdue	6	–	1	–	1	9	–	2	–	1
Ohio State	6	–	2	–	0	7	–	4	–	1
Minnesota	4	–	4	–	0	5	–	6	–	0
Wisconsin	3	–	4	–	2	5	–	4	–	2
Indiana	3	–	5	–	0	4	–	7	–	0
Iowa	2	–	6	–	0	2	–	9	–	0
Illinois	0	–	6	–	2	1	–	8	–	2
Northwestern	0	–	8	–	1	0	–	10	–	1
+ – Conference co-champions; Rankings from AP Poll

The 1978 Indiana Hoosiers football team represented the Indiana Hoosiers in the 1978 Big Ten Conference football season. They participated as members of the Big Ten Conference. The Hoosiers played their home games at Memorial Stadium in Bloomington, Indiana. The team was coached by Lee Corso, in his sixth year as head coach of the Hoosiers.

== Schedule ==
Date	Opponent	Site	TV	Result	Attendance	Source
September 16	at No. 13 LSU*	Tiger Stadium; Baton Rouge, LA		L 17–24	78,534	
September 23	No. 15 Washington*	Memorial Stadium; Bloomington, IN		W 14–7	40,244	
September 30	No. 12 Nebraska*	Memorial Stadium; Bloomington, IN	ABC	L 17–69	42,738	
October 7	at Wisconsin	Camp Randall Stadium; Madison, WI		L 7–34	75,266	
October 14	Northwestern^{†}	Memorial Stadium; Bloomington, IN		W 38–10	36,456	
October 21	at Michigan State	Spartan Stadium; East Lansing, MI (rivalry)		L 14–49	76,013	
October 28	Illinois	Memorial Stadium; Bloomington, IN (rivalry)		W 31–10	37,355	
November 4	at Minnesota	Memorial Stadium; Minneapolis, MN		L 31–32	39,797	
November 11	Iowa	Memorial Stadium; Bloomington, IN		W 34–14	33,167	
November 18	No. 19 Ohio State	Memorial Stadium; Bloomington, IN		L 18–21	47,540	
November 25	at No. 18 Purdue	Ross–Ade Stadium; West Lafayette, IN (Old Oaken Bucket)		L 7–20	69,918	
*Non-conference game; ^{†}Homecoming; Rankings from AP Poll released prior to the game

== Game summaries ==
=== Ohio State ===
Ohio State Buckeyes (6–2–1) at Indiana Hoosiers (4–5)

Quarter	1	2	3	4	Total
Ohio St	7	0	7	7	21
Indiana	7	3	0	8	18

at Memorial Stadium, Bloomington, Indiana

- Date: November 18, 1978
- Game weather: Overcast • 41 °F (5 °C) • Wind 8 miles per hour (13 km/h; 7.0 kn) to 10 miles per hour (16 km/h; 8.7 kn)
- Game attendance: 47,540

Game information

First quarter

- OSU – Paul Campbell 3-yard run (Vlade Janakievski kick), 10:19. Ohio St 7–0. Drive:
- IU – Mike Harkrader 1-yard run (David Freud kick), 2:04. Tie 7–7. Drive:

Second quarter

- IU – David Freud 30-yard field goal, 6:52. Indiana 10–7. Drive:

Third quarter

- OSU – Art Schlichter 3-yard run (Vlade Janakievski kick), 2:58. Ohio St 14–10. Drive: 20 plays, 98 yards.

Fourth quarter;

- OSU – Ricky Johnson 46-yard run (Vlade Janakievski kick), 13:13. Ohio St 21–10. Drive: 8 plays.
- IU – Darrick Burnett 1-yard run (pass good), 5:01. Ohio St 21–18. Drive:

Top passers

- OSU – Art Schlichter – 4/11, 22 yards, INT
- IU – Tim Clifford – 10/19, 81 yards

Top rushers

- OSU – Ricky Johnson – 18 rushes, 109 yards, TD
- IU – Darrick Burnett – 18 rushes, 65 yards, TD

Top receivers

- OSU – Ricky Johnson – 2 receptions, 9 yards
- IU – Dan Powers – 6 receptions, 62 yards

== Roster ==
1978 Indiana Hoosiers football team roster
Players
Coaches
Offense

Pos.	#	Name	Class
OT	73	Gerhard Ahting	So
QB		Scott Arnett
RB		Jerry Bowers
RB		Glenn Brooks
RB		Darrick Burnett
QB	14	Tim Clifford	So
RB		Al Darring
WR		Mark Fishel
WR	88	Mike Friede	Jr
RB		Mike Harkrader
C	50	Mark Heidel	Sr
RB		Rodney Hopkins
QB		Chad Huck
RB		Lonnie Johnson
G	64	Mark Johnson	Jr
WR		Nate Lundy
OL		Doug Peacock
WR		Ron Pennick
OL		Jeff Phipps
TE		Dan Powers
TE		Bob Stephenson

Defense

Pos.	#	Name	Class
DB		Dave Abrams
DL		George Doehla
DB		Dale Keneipp
DL		Al Leake
DL		Greg McIntosh
LB	35	Joe Norman	Sr
DL		Carl Smith
DB		John Swinehart
LB		Doug Sybert
DL		Terry Tallen
DL		Brent Tisdale
DB		Tim Wilbur
DL		Randy Willhite

Special teams

Pos.	#	Name	Class
K		David Freud

Head coach

- Lee Corso

Coordinators/assistant coaches

Legend

- (C) Team captain
- (S) Suspended
- (I) Ineligible
- Injured
- Redshirt

== 1979 NFL draftees ==
Player	Position	Round	Pick	NFL club
Joe Norman	Linebacker	2	45	Seattle Seahawks
