= 1978 Illinois Fighting Illini football team =

American college football season

1978 Illinois Fighting Illini football
- Conference: Big Ten Conference
- Record: 1–8–2 (0–6–2 Big Ten)
- Head coach: Gary Moeller (2nd season)
- MVPs: John Sullivan; Randy Taylor
- Captains: John Sullivan; Randy Taylor
- Home stadium: Memorial Stadium

1978 Big Ten Conference football standings
| | Conf. | | | | | Overall |
| Team | W | | L | | T | W | | L | | T |
|---|---|---|---|---|---|---|---|---|---|---|
| No. 5 Michigan + | 7 | – | 1 | – | 0 | 10 | – | 2 | – | 0 |
| No. 12 Michigan State + | 7 | – | 1 | – | 0 | 8 | – | 3 | – | 0 |
| No. 13 Purdue | 6 | – | 1 | – | 1 | 9 | – | 2 | – | 1 |
| Ohio State | 6 | – | 2 | – | 0 | 7 | – | 4 | – | 1 |
| Minnesota | 4 | – | 4 | – | 0 | 5 | – | 6 | – | 0 |
| Wisconsin | 3 | – | 4 | – | 2 | 5 | – | 4 | – | 2 |
| Indiana | 3 | – | 5 | – | 0 | 4 | – | 7 | – | 0 |
| Iowa | 2 | – | 6 | – | 0 | 2 | – | 9 | – | 0 |
| Illinois | 0 | – | 6 | – | 2 | 1 | – | 8 | – | 2 |
| Northwestern | 0 | – | 8 | – | 1 | 0 | – | 10 | – | 1 |
+ – Conference co-champions; Rankings from AP Poll

The 1978 Illinois Fighting Illini football team was an American football team that represented the University of Illinois as a member of the Big Ten Conference during the 1978 Big Ten season. In their second year under head coach Gary Moeller, the Illini compiled a 1–8–2 record (0–6–2 in conference games), finished in ninth place in the Big Ten, and were outscored by a total of 317 to 103.

The team's statistical leaders included quarterback Rich Weiss (665 passing yards, 53.2% completion percentage), running back Wayne Strader (389 rushing yards, 5.3 yards per carry), wide receiver Jeff Barnes (22 receptions for 270 yards, and kicker Dave Finzer (23 points scored, eight of nine extra points, five of eight field goals). Linebacker John Sullivan and center Randy Taylor were selected as the team's most valuable players.

The team played its home games at Memorial Stadium in Champaign, Illinois.

== Schedule ==
| Date | Opponent | Site | Result | Attendance | Source |
|---|---|---|---|---|---|
| September 9 | Northwestern | Memorial Stadium; Champaign, IL (rivalry) | T 0–0 | 40,091 | |
| September 16 | at No. 4 Michigan | Michigan Stadium; Ann Arbor, MI (rivalry) | L 0–31 | 104,102 | |
| September 23 | Stanford* | Memorial Stadium; Champaign, IL | L 10–35 | 43,143 | |
| September 30 | at Syracuse* | Archbold Stadium; Syracuse, NY | W 28–14 | 20,101 | |
| October 7 | at Missouri* | Faurot Field; Columbia, MO (rivalry) | L 3–45 | 62,062 | |
| October 14 | Wisconsin | Memorial Stadium; Champaign, IL | T 20–20 | 51,160 | |
| October 21 | No. 19 Purdue | Memorial Stadium; Champaign, IL (rivalry) | L 0–13 | 50,918 | |
| October 28 | at Indiana | Memorial Stadium; Bloomington, IN (rivalry) | L 10–31 | 37,355 | |
| November 4 | No. 18 Michigan State | Memorial Stadium; Champaign, IL | L 19–59 | 48,077 | |
| November 11 | at Ohio State | Ohio Stadium; Columbus, OH (Illibuck) | L 7–45 | 87,719 | |
| November 18 | at Minnesota | Memorial Stadium; Minneapolis, MN | L 6–24 | 25,388 | |
*Non-conference game; Rankings from AP Poll released prior to the game
