= 1978 Iowa Hawkeyes football team =

American college football season

1978 Iowa Hawkeyes football
- Conference: Big Ten Conference
- Record: 2–9 (2–6 Big Ten)
- Head coach: Bob Commings (5th season)
- Defensive coordinator: Larry Coyer (4th season)
- MVP: Brad Reid
- Captains: Jon Lazar; Tom Rusk; Tim Gutshall; Dave Becker
- Home stadium: Kinnick Stadium

1978 Big Ten Conference football standings
	Conf.					Overall
Team	W		L		T	W		L		T
No. 5 Michigan +	7	–	1	–	0	10	–	2	–	0
No. 12 Michigan State +	7	–	1	–	0	8	–	3	–	0
No. 13 Purdue	6	–	1	–	1	9	–	2	–	1
Ohio State	6	–	2	–	0	7	–	4	–	1
Minnesota	4	–	4	–	0	5	–	6	–	0
Wisconsin	3	–	4	–	2	5	–	4	–	2
Indiana	3	–	5	–	0	4	–	7	–	0
Iowa	2	–	6	–	0	2	–	9	–	0
Illinois	0	–	6	–	2	1	–	8	–	2
Northwestern	0	–	8	–	1	0	–	10	–	1
+ – Conference co-champions; Rankings from AP Poll

The 1978 Iowa Hawkeyes football team was an American football team that represented the University of Iowa as a member of the Big Ten Conference during the 1978 Big Ten football season. In their fifth and final year under head coach Bob Commings, the Hawkeyes compiled a 2–9 record (2–6 in conference games), finished in eighth place in the Big Ten, and were outscored by a total of 291 to 125.

The 1978 Hawkeyes gained 1,366 rushing yards and 1,083 passing yards. On defense, they gave up 2,054 rushing yards and 1,947 passing yards. The team's statistical leaders included quarterback Jeff Green (41-of-103 passing for 556 yards), fullback Jon Lazar (423 rushing yards, 18 receptions for 72 yards), Brad Reid (36 points scored), and linebacker Tom Rusk with 106 total tackles. Lazar, Rusk, linebacker Tim Gutshall, and defensive back Dave Becker were the team captains. Split end Brad Reid (168 rushing yards, 322 receiving yards) was selected as the team's most valuable player.

Two days after the final game of the season, the program's 17th consecutive losing season, Commings was fired. He had compiled a 17–38 record in five years as the Hawkeyes' head football coach. Less than two weeks later, Hayden Fry was introduced as the new head coach.

The team played its home games at Kinnick Stadium in Iowa City, Iowa. Home attendance totaled 319,289, an average of 53,214 per game.

== Schedule ==
Date	Opponent	Site	Result	Attendance	Source
September 16	Northwestern	Kinnick Stadium; Iowa City, IA	W 20–3	56,840	
September 23	No. 20 Iowa State*	Kinnick Stadium; Iowa City, IA (rivalry)	L 0–31	60,075	
September 30	at Arizona*	Arizona Stadium; Tucson, AZ	L 3–23	46,851	
October 7	Utah*	Kinnick Stadium; Iowa City, IA	L 9–13	51,170	
October 14	at Minnesota	Memorial Stadium; Minneapolis, MN (rivalry)	L 20–22	51,381	
October 21	at Ohio State	Ohio Stadium; Columbus, OH	L 7–31	87,326	
October 28	No. 17 Purdue	Kinnick Stadium; Iowa City, IA	L 7–34	57,640	
November 4	No. 8 Michigan	Kinnick Stadium; Iowa City, IA	L 0–34	49,120	
November 11	at Indiana	Memorial Stadium; Bloomington, IN	L 14–34	33,167	
November 18	Wisconsin	Kinnick Stadium; Iowa City, IA (rivalry)	W 38–24	44,444	
November 25	at No. 14 Michigan State	Spartan Stadium; East Lansing, MI	L 7–42	57,007	
*Non-conference game; Rankings from AP Poll released prior to the game

== Game summaries ==
=== Northwestern ===
Northwestern at Iowa

Team	1	2	3	4	Total
• Wildcats	7	7	6	0	20
Hawkeyes	0	3	0	0	3

- Date: September 16
- Location: Kinnick Stadium, Iowa City, Iowa
- Game attendance: 56,840

Scoring summary
1		IOWA	Brad Reid 55-yard pass from Rod Morton (Schilling kick)	Iowa 7–0
2	4:44	IOWA	Todd Simonsen 4-yard fumble return (Schilling kick)	Iowa 14–0
2		NW	Nick Mirkopulos	Iowa 14–3
3	2:15	IOWA	Brad Reid 5-yard run (kick failed)	Iowa 20–3

=== Purdue ===
Purdue at Iowa

Team	1	2	3	4	Total
• No. 17 Boilermakers	10	7	0	17	34
Hawkeyes	0	0	7	0	7

- Date: October 28
- Location: Kinnick Stadium, Iowa City, Iowa
- Game attendance: 57,460

Scoring summary
1	PUR	Sovereen 39-yard field goal	Purdue 3–0
1	PUR	Pope 11-yard run (Sovereen kick)	Purdue 10–0
2	PUR	Young 25-yard pass from Herrmann (Sovereen kick)	Purdue 17–0
3	IOWA	Reid 57-yard run (Schilling kick)	Purdue 17–7
4	PUR	Burrell 11-yard pass from Herrmann (Sovereen kick)	Purdue 24–7
4	PUR	Sovereen 27-yard field goal	Purdue 27–7
4	PUR	Eubank 3-yard pass from Herrmann (Sovereen kick)	Purdue 34–7

== Roster ==
1978 Iowa Hawkeyes football team roster
Players
Coaches
Offense

Pos.	#	Name	Class
QB		Bobby Commings Jr.	So
QB	12	Pete Gales	Fr
C	54	Jay Hilgenberg	So
FB	44	Jon Lazar	Sr
RB		Rod Morton	Jr
RB	18	Dennis Mosley	Jr
WR	87	Brad Reid	Jr
QB	16	Phil Suess	So
TE		Jim Swift	Jr

Defense

Pos.	#	Name	Class
DB		Dave Becker	Sr
DL	97	Doug Benschoter	Sr
LB		Tim Gutshall	Sr
LB	47	Tom Rusk	Sr
DE	45	Steve Vazquez	Sr

Special teams

Pos.	#	Name	Class
K		Scott Schilling	So

Head coach

- Bob Commings

Coordinators/assistant coaches

- Del Miller – Offensive assistant
- Tom Hayes – Defensive backs
- Dan McCarney – Graduate assistant

Legend

- (C) Team captain
- (S) Suspended
- (I) Ineligible
- Injured
- Redshirt

== 1979 NFL draft ==
Player	Position	Round	Pick	NFL club
Tom Rusk	LB	9	227	New York Giants
