= Mike Harden =

American football player (born 1959)

No. 31, 45
- Position: Defensive back

Personal information
- Born: February 16, 1959 (age 67); Memphis, Tennessee, U.S.
- Listed height: 6 ft 1 in (1.85 m)
- Listed weight: 192 lb (87 kg)

Career information
- High school: Central (Detroit, Michigan)
- College: Michigan
- NFL draft: 1980: 5th round, 131st overall pick

Career history
- Denver Broncos (1980–1988); Los Angeles Raiders (1989–1990)

Awards and highlights
- First-team All-Big Ten (1978); Second-team All-Big Ten (1979)

Career NFL statistics
- Interceptions: 38
- Fumble recoveries: 14
- Touchdowns: 5
- Stats at Pro Football Reference

Michael Harden (born February 16, 1959) is an American former professional football player who was a defensive back in the National Football League (NFL). He played college football for the Michigan Wolverines from 1977 to 1979. He then played in the NFL for 11 years for the Denver Broncos from 1980 to 1988 and for the Los Angeles Raiders from 1989 to 1990.

== Early life ==
Harden was born in Memphis, Tennessee, in 1959. He attended Central High School in Detroit.

== University of Michigan ==
Harden enrolled at the University of Michigan in 1976 and played college football as a defensive back for Bo Schembechler's Michigan Wolverines football teams from 1976 to 1979. In September 1978, Harden and Jerry Meter both intercepted passes thrown by Joe Montana to help secure a 28–14 victory over Notre Dame. He was selected as a first-team defensive back on the 1978 All-Big Ten Conference football team. Over the course of his collegiate career, Harden had 89 tackles, 42 assists, 6 interceptions and 95 return yards, 16 pass breakups, and 3 fumble recoveries. Harden also returned 24 punts for 156 yards.

== Professional football ==
Harden was selected by the Denver Broncos in the fifth round (131st overall pick) of the 1980 NFL draft. He appeared in 128 games, 98 as a starter, at the safety and cornerback positions for the Broncos from 1980 to 1988. He intercepted 33 passes in his nine years with the Broncos.

Harden was fined $5,000 (equivalent to $13,611 in 2025), for a hit in the opening game of the 1988 season against division rival Seattle Seahawks that knocked out Steve Largent and resulted in a concussion and the loss of two teeth. Fourteen weeks later, in Seattle, Harden intercepted a Dave Krieg pass in the end zone and returned it twenty-five yards before being knocked off his feet by Largent and fumbling the football, which Largent also pounced on, giving the Seahawks possession again. Largent later said in an interview that the hit was retaliation in part for the hit that Harden gave Largent earlier in the season.

Harden concluded his career with the Los Angeles Raiders during the 1989 and 1990 seasons. During his 11-year NFL career, he intercepted 38 passes for 663 yards and 4 touchdowns, and recovered 14 fumbles. As of 2017, his 179 interception return yards in 1986 is a Broncos record. On special teams, Harden returned 8 punts for 113 yards and a touchdown and returned 26 kickoffs for 414 yards.

== Personal life ==
Harden married Magaly Fernandez Harden in 1994 and had one child, Chanel Marie Harden. In 2003, he was sentenced to six years in prison for stealing from several women.
