= 1978 Minnesota Golden Gophers football team =

American college football season

1978 Minnesota Golden Gophers football
- Conference: Big Ten Conference
- Record: 5–6 (4–4 Big Ten)
- Head coach: Cal Stoll (7th season)
- MVP: Marion Barber Jr.
- Captain: Stan Systma
- Home stadium: Memorial Stadium

1978 Big Ten Conference football standings
	Conf.					Overall
Team	W		L		T	W		L		T
No. 5 Michigan +	7	–	1	–	0	10	–	2	–	0
No. 12 Michigan State +	7	–	1	–	0	8	–	3	–	0
No. 13 Purdue	6	–	1	–	1	9	–	2	–	1
Ohio State	6	–	2	–	0	7	–	4	–	1
Minnesota	4	–	4	–	0	5	–	6	–	0
Wisconsin	3	–	4	–	2	5	–	4	–	2
Indiana	3	–	5	–	0	4	–	7	–	0
Iowa	2	–	6	–	0	2	–	9	–	0
Illinois	0	–	6	–	2	1	–	8	–	2
Northwestern	0	–	8	–	1	0	–	10	–	1
+ – Conference co-champions; Rankings from AP Poll

The 1978 Minnesota Golden Gophers football team represented the University of Minnesota in the 1978 Big Ten Conference football season. In their seventh and final year under head coach Cal Stoll, the Golden Gophers compiled a 7–5 record but were outscored by their opponents by a combined total of 267 to 210.

Tailback Marion Barber Jr. received the team's Most Valuable Player award. Barber Jr., kicker Paul Rogind, defensive back Keith Brown and defensive end Stan Sytsma were named All-Big Ten first team. Nose guard Doug Friberg and defensive tackle Jim Ronan were named All-Big Ten second team. Sytsma was named Academic All-Big Ten.

Total attendance for the season was 238,072, which averaged to 39,678. The season high for attendance was against Ohio State.

== Schedule ==
Date	Opponent	Site	Result	Attendance	Source
September 16	Toledo*	Memorial Stadium; Minneapolis, MN	W 38–12	31,223	
September 23	No. 16 Ohio State	Memorial Stadium; Minneapolis, MN	L 10–27	55,200	
September 30	at No. 18 UCLA*	Los Angeles Memorial Coliseum; Los Angeles, CA	L 3–17	40,369	
October 7	Oregon State*	Memorial Stadium; Minneapolis, MN	L 14–17	35,083	
October 14	Iowa	Memorial Stadium; Minneapolis, MN (rivalry)	W 22–20	51,381	
October 21	at Northwestern	Dyche Stadium; Evanston, IL	W 38–14	16,452	
October 28	at No. 8 Michigan	Michigan Stadium; Ann Arbor, MI (Little Brown Jug)	L 10–42	105,308	
November 4	Indiana^{†}	Memorial Stadium; Minneapolis, MN	W 32–31	39,797	
November 11	at No. 17 Michigan State	Spartan Stadium; East Lansing, MI	L 9–33	72,122	
November 18	Illinois	Memorial Stadium; Minneapolis, MN	W 24–6	25,388	
November 25	at Wisconsin	Camp Randall Stadium; Madison, WI (rivalry)	L 10–48	61,000	
*Non-conference game; ^{†}Homecoming; Rankings from AP Poll released prior to the game
