= 1978 Wisconsin Badgers football team =

American college football season

1978 Wisconsin Badgers football
- Conference: Big Ten Conference
- Record: 5–4–2 (3–4–2 Big Ten)
- Head coach: Dave McClain (1st season)
- Offensive scheme: Triple option
- Defensive coordinator: Jim Hilles (1st season)
- Base defense: 3–4
- MVP: Mike Kalasmiki
- Captains: David Charles; Dave Crossen; Dan Relich
- Home stadium: Camp Randall Stadium

1978 Big Ten Conference football standings
	Conf.					Overall
Team	W		L		T	W		L		T
No. 5 Michigan +	7	–	1	–	0	10	–	2	–	0
No. 12 Michigan State +	7	–	1	–	0	8	–	3	–	0
No. 13 Purdue	6	–	1	–	1	9	–	2	–	1
Ohio State	6	–	2	–	0	7	–	4	–	1
Minnesota	4	–	4	–	0	5	–	6	–	0
Wisconsin	3	–	4	–	2	5	–	4	–	2
Indiana	3	–	5	–	0	4	–	7	–	0
Iowa	2	–	6	–	0	2	–	9	–	0
Illinois	0	–	6	–	2	1	–	8	–	2
Northwestern	0	–	8	–	1	0	–	10	–	1
+ – Conference co-champions; Rankings from AP Poll

The 1978 Wisconsin Badgers football team represented the University of Wisconsin–Madison in the 1978 Big Ten Conference football season. Led by first-year head coach Dave McClain, the Badgers compiled an overall record of 5–4–2 with a mark of 3–4–2 in conference play, placing sixth in the Big Ten. Wisconsin played home games at Camp Randall Stadium in Madison, Wisconsin.

== Schedule ==
Date	Opponent	Site	Result	Attendance	Source
September 16	Richmond*	Camp Randall Stadium; Madison, WI	W 7–6	60,877	
September 23	at Northwestern	Dyche Stadium; Evanston, IL	W 28–7	23,960	
September 30	Oregon*	Camp Randall Stadium; Madison, WI	W 22–19	63,988	
October 7	Indiana	Camp Randall Stadium; Madison, WI	W 34–7	75,266	
October 14	at Illinois	Memorial Stadium; Champaign, IL	T 20–20	51,160	
October 21	No. 9 Michigan	Camp Randall Stadium; Madison, WI	L 0–42	80,024	
October 28	at Michigan State	Spartan Stadium; East Lansing, MI	L 2–55	70,144	
November 4	Ohio State	Camp Randall Stadium; Madison, WI	L 14–49	79,940	
November 11	Purdue^{†}	Camp Randall Stadium; Madison, WI	T 24–24	78,986	
November 18	at Iowa	Kinnick Stadium; Iowa City, IA (rivalry)	L 24–38	44,444	
November 25	Minnesota	Camp Randall Stadium; Madison, WI (rivalry)	W 48–10	61,021	
*Non-conference game; ^{†}Homecoming; Rankings from AP Poll released prior to the game

== Roster ==
1978 Wisconsin Badgers football team roster
Players
Coaches
Offense

Pos.	#	Name	Class
WR	19	Tom Braker	Jr
WR	10	David Charles (C)	Sr
RB	39	Kevin Cohee	Sr
TE	94	Jerry Doerger	Fr
QB, RB	11	Charles Green	Sr
G	56	Brad Jackomino	Sr
QB	13	John Josten	Fr
QB	18	Mike Kalasmiki	Jr
G	66	Pat Kelly	Sr
OT	68	Dave Krall	Jr
TE	88	Mike Krepfle	So
G	63	Jim Martine	Jr
RB	25	Ira Matthews	Sr
C	50	Jim McCoy	Sr
FB	28	Dave Mohapp	Fr
C	52	Jim Moore	Sr
RB	33	Curtis Richardson	Fr
C	59	Joe Rothbauer	Jr
TE	81	Joe Ruetz	So
OT	75	Ray Snell	Jr
FB	26	Tom Stauss	Jr
WR	42	Tim Stracka	Fr
TE	87	Ray Sydnor	So
WR	6	Wayne Souza	Jr
OT	79	Ralph Turturro	Sr
FB	84	Bob Wagner	Sr
OT	98	Paul Wasikowski	Jr

Defense

Pos.	#	Name	Class
DT	73	Henry Addy	Sr
LB	41	Dave Ahrens	So
CB	29	Ross Anderson	So
DE	85	Curt Blaskowski	So
LB	95	Guy Boliaux	Fr
DT	67	Kasey Cabral	Jr
CB	30	Mickey Casey	Jr
LB	48	Dennis Christenson	Jr
LB	14	Dave Crossen (C)	Sr
S	8	Greg Gordon	Sr
LB	15	Kurt Holm	Sr
DT	90	Thomas Houston	So
CB	37	Lawrence Johnson	Sr
LB	43	Don Lorenz	Jr
MG	20	Dan Relich (C)	Sr
DE	45	Mark Sawicki	So
S	9	Dan Schieble	Sr
DT	76	Tom Schremp	Jr
S	5	Terry Stroede	Jr
S	12	George Welch	Jr
DT	77	George Wojtowicz	Fr

Special teams

Pos.	#	Name	Class
K	2	Mike Brhely	Sr
P	39	John Kiltz	So
K	7	Steve Veith	Jr

Head coach

- Dave McClain

Coordinators/assistant coaches

- Jim Hilles – Defensive Coordinator/Linebackers
- Bill Dudley – Quarterbacks and Receivers
- Doug Graber – Defensive Backs
- Arnold Jeter – Defensive Line
- Cliff Knox – Running Backs
- Mike Nelson – Defensive Ends
- Bob Palcic – Tackles and Tight Ends
- Mario Russo – Centers and Guards
- George Chryst – Administrative Assistant

Legend

- (C) Team captain
- (S) Suspended
- (I) Ineligible
- Injured
- Redshirt

== Team players in the 1979 NFL draft ==
Player	Position	Round	Pick	NFL club
Lawrence Johnson	Defensive back	2	40	Cleveland Browns
Ira Matthews	Wide receiver	6	142	Oakland Raiders
