= Ron Simpkins =

American football player (born 1958)

No. 56, 51
- Position: Linebacker

Personal information
- Born: April 2, 1958 (age 68); Detroit, Michigan, U.S.
- Listed height: 6 ft 1 in (1.85 m)
- Listed weight: 235 lb (107 kg)

Career information
- High school: Western (Detroit)
- College: Michigan
- NFL draft: 1980: 7th round, 167th overall pick

Career history
- Cincinnati Bengals (1980–1986); Green Bay Packers (1988)

Awards and highlights
- First-team All-American (1979); 3× First-team All-Big Ten (1977, 1978, 1979)

Career NFL statistics
- Sacks: 4.5
- Fumble recoveries: 4
- Stats at Pro Football Reference

Ronald Bernard Simpkins (born April 2, 1958) is an American former professional football player who was a linebacker in the National Football League (NFL). He played college football for the Michigan Wolverines from 1976 to 1979. He became Michigan's all-time career tackle leader in 1979 and was a consensus first-team selection for the 1979 College Football All-America Team. He later played in the NFL for the Cincinnati Bengals (1980, 1982–1986) and the Green Bay Packers (1988).

== Early life ==
Simpkins was born in Detroit, Michigan, in 1958. He attended Western International High School in Detroit.

== University of Michigan ==
Simpkins enrolled at the University of Michigan in 1976 and played college football as an inside linebacker for coach Bo Schembechler's Michigan Wolverines football teams from 1976 to 1979. Simpkins saw playing time as a freshman and won the John F. Maulbetsch Award in the spring of 1977, given each year by the University of Michigan after spring practice to a freshman football candidate on the basis of desire, character, capacity for leadership and future success both on and off the football field.

As a sophomore, Simpkins was the leading tackler for the 1977 Michigan Wolverines football team that compiled 10-2 record, won the Big Ten Conference championship, and allowed only 97 points (8.8 points per game) in 11 regular season games. Simpkins totaled 144 tackles, nearly double the total of 76 compiled by the team's second-leading tackler. He also sacked opposing quarterbacks 10 times and recovered five fumbles in 1977. In the final regular season game of the 1977 season, Simpkins had 20 tackles (15 solo) and recovered a fumble that set up the game-winning touchdown in Michigan's 14-6 victory over Ohio State.

As a junior, Simpkins was Michigan's leading tackler for the second straight year. His 144 tackles was once again nearly double the 79 compiled by the team's second-leading tackler. He led the 1978 Michigan Wolverines football team to its second straight 10-2 record with a defense that allowed only 88 points (8.0 points per game) in 11 regular season games. At the end of the 1978 season, Simpkins was selected as a first-team All-Big Ten Conference linebacker.

As a senior, Simpkins was Michigan's leading tackler for the third consecutive season, and he was selected as the Most Valuable Player on the 1979 Michigan Wolverines football team. He was also a consensus selection on the 1979 College Football All-America Team, earning first-team honors from the Associated Press, United Press International and Football Writers Association of America.

In his four years at Michigan, Simpkins set a school record with 415 tackles (including 262 solo tackles). His career tackles record stood until 1996 when Jarrett Irons concluded his Michigan career with 429 tackles. During his Michigan career, Simpkins also had 11 pass breakups, seven fumble recoveries and an interception.

== Professional football ==
Simpkins was selected by the Cincinnati Bengals in the seventh round (167th overall pick) of the 1980 NFL draft. He signed with the Bengals in May 1980. As a rookie, he started two games following an injury to Glenn Cameron.

Simpkins did not appear in any games during the 1981 NFL season. He returned in 1982 but was cut by the Bengals during the first week of September 1981. He returned to the Bengals midseason in 1982, appearing in five games as a backup. In 1983, he appeared in 15 games as a backup linebacker. Simpkins finally became a starter for the 1984 and 1985 Bengals, appearing in all 32 games, including 20 games as a starter. In 1986, Simpkins returned to a backup role for the Bengals. Following the 1987 preseason, Simpkins was cut by the Bengals in the first week of September.

After being cut by the Bengals, Simpkins did not play in the NFL during the 1987 season. He signed with the Green Bay Packers in May 1988. After being cut late in the preseason, he was re-signed by the Packers in late September 1988. He appeared in seven games, all as a backup, for the Packers during the 1988 NFL season.

Between 1980 and 1988, Simpkins appeared in 91 NFL games, 22 of them as a starter.

== Coaching career ==
In the spring of 1990, Simpkins returned to Detroit to coach football. During a career that spanned eighteen seasons, Ron was at the helm for the Cowboys of Western International High School; he retired in 2007.
