= 1978 Northwestern Wildcats football team =

American college football season

1978 Northwestern Wildcats football
- Conference: Big Ten Conference
- Record: 0–10–1 (0–8–1 Big Ten)
- Head coach: Rick Venturi (1st season)
- Captains: Pat Geegan; Mike Kranz
- Home stadium: Dyche Stadium

1978 Big Ten Conference football standings
	Conf.					Overall
Team	W		L		T	W		L		T
No. 5 Michigan +	7	–	1	–	0	10	–	2	–	0
No. 12 Michigan State +	7	–	1	–	0	8	–	3	–	0
No. 13 Purdue	6	–	1	–	1	9	–	2	–	1
Ohio State	6	–	2	–	0	7	–	4	–	1
Minnesota	4	–	4	–	0	5	–	6	–	0
Wisconsin	3	–	4	–	2	5	–	4	–	2
Indiana	3	–	5	–	0	4	–	7	–	0
Iowa	2	–	6	–	0	2	–	9	–	0
Illinois	0	–	6	–	2	1	–	8	–	2
Northwestern	0	–	8	–	1	0	–	10	–	1
+ – Conference co-champions; Rankings from AP Poll

The 1978 Northwestern Wildcats team represented Northwestern University during the 1978 Big Ten Conference football season. In their first year under head coach Rick Venturi, the Wildcats compiled a 0–10–1 record (0–8–1 against Big Ten Conference opponents) and finished in last place in the Big Ten Conference.

The team's offensive leaders were quarterback Kevin Strasser with 1,526 passing yards, Mike Cammon with 322 rushing yards, and Steve Bogan with 353 receiving yards.

== Schedule ==
Date	Opponent	Site	Result	Attendance	Source
September 9	at Illinois	Memorial Stadium; Champaign, IL (rivalry)	T 0–0	40,091	
September 16	at Iowa	Kinnick Stadium; Iowa City, IA	L 3–20	56,840	
September 23	Wisconsin	Dyche Stadium; Evanston, IL	L 7–28	23,960	
September 30	at No. 16 Colorado*	Folsom Field; Boulder, CO	L 7–55	44,709	
October 7	Arizona State*	Dyche Stadium; Evanston, IL	L 14–56	17,009	
October 14	at Indiana	Memorial Stadium; Bloomington, IN	L 10–38	36,456	
October 21	Minnesota	Dyche Stadium; Evanston, IL	L 14–38	16,452	
October 28	at Ohio State	Ohio Stadium; Columbus, OH	L 20–63	87,296	
November 4	at No. 14 Purdue	Ross–Ade Stadium; West Lafayette, IN	L 0–31	64,232	
November 11	No. 7 Michigan	Dyche Stadium; Evanston, IL (rivalry)	L 14–59	27,013	
November 18	No. 16 Michigan State	Dyche Stadium; Evanston, IL	L 3–52	14,157	
*Non-conference game; Rankings from AP Poll released prior to the game

== Roster ==
1978 Northwestern Wildcats football team roster
Players
Coaches
Offense

Pos.	#	Name	Class
C	57	Mike Fielder	Jr
QB	12	Mike Kerrigan	Fr
TE	85	Wally Kaspryscki	Jr
OT	55	Phil Reitz	Jr
OT	75	Rob Taylor	Fr

Defense

Pos.	#	Name	Class
CB	18	Steve Bobowski	Sr
DB	6	Guy Knafelc	Sr
DT	74	Norm Wells	Jr

Special teams

Pos.	#	Name	Class

Head coach

- Rick Venturi

Coordinators/assistant coaches

Legend

- (C) Team captain
- (S) Suspended
- (I) Ineligible
- Injured
- Redshirt
