= Milan Vooletich =

American football player and coach (1941–2006)

Biographical details
- Born: October 9, 1941; Pittsburgh, Pennsylvania
- Died: October 26, 2006 (aged 65); San Antonio, Texas

Playing career
- 1962–1963: Geneva

Coaching career (HC unless noted)
- 1964–1968: Sandusky HS (OH) (assistant)
- 1969–1973: Miami (OH) (assistant)
- 1974–1977: Colorado (assistant)
- 1978–1985: Michigan (assistant)
- 1986: Rice (DC)
- 1987–1989: Navy (DC)
- 1990–1995: Iowa (assistant)
- 1996: Kentucky (assistant)

Milan Emil Vooletich Jr. (October 9, 1941 – October 26, 2006) was an American football player and coach. He played football at Geneva College in the mid-1960s and later had a 32-year career as a football coach including eight years as an assistant coach under Bo Schembechler at the University of Michigan, five years as an assistant coach under Hayden Fry at the University of Iowa and stints as the defensive coordinator at Rice University and Navy.

== Biography ==
=== Early years ===
Vooletich was a native of Pittsburgh, Pennsylvania, and a graduate of Pittsburgh's Carrick High School. Vooletich attended Geneva College in Beaver Falls, Pennsylvania, where he played football for the Geneva Golden Tornadoes football team from 1962 to 1965.

=== Sandusky High School ===
After graduating from Geneva College in 1964, Vooletich began coaching high school football at Sandusky High School in Sandusky, Ohio. Vooletich also taught social studies at Sandusky High School. During Vooletich's years at Sandusky, he served under head coaches Earle Bruce, Bob Seaman and Bob Reublin. The 1966 Sandusky Blue Streaks posted a perfect 10–0 record and claimed the Ohio state championship. While coaching at Sandusky, Vooletich developed a close relationship with defensive standout, Thom Darden. When Darden became an All-American at Michigan, he paid tribute to Vooletich for helping him become a top defensive player. Vooletich later said of Darden: "Thom and I came into the Sandusky High football program in 1964. He is a whole individual, warm person, concerned, and means a little extra to me and my family."

=== Assistant to Bill Mallory at Miami and Colorado ===
In 1969, Sandusky High School graduate, Bill Mallory, was hired to replace Bo Schembechler as the head football coach at Miami University in Oxford, Ohio. Mallory asked Vooletich and Sandusky head coach Bob Reublin to join him at Miami. Vooletich was a graduate assistant in 1969 and was promoted to full-time varsity football staff member in 1970. Vooletich also received his master's degree in education administration from Miami University in 1970. He served on Mallory's staff at Miami for five seasons from 1969 to 1973. In 1974, Mallory left Miami to take the head coaching position at Colorado, and Vooletich and Rebulin moved to Colorado with Mallory. Vooletich was Colorado's defensive backs coach for four years from 1974 to 1977.

=== University of Michigan ===
In 1978, Vooletich accepted a position as an assistant coach under Bo Schembechler at the University of Michigan. Vooletich remained a coach at Michigan for eight years under Schembechler. While at Michigan, Vooletich helped coached several strong defensive units, including the 1985 team that allowed 98 points in 12 games (8.16 points per game), the 1978 team that allowed 105 points in 12 games (8.75 points per game) and the 1980 team that allowed 129 points in 12 games (10.75 points per game).

=== Defensive coordinator at Rice and Navy ===
In 1986, Vooletich left Michigan to become the defensive coordinator at Rice University.

In 1987, Vooletich's former co-assistant at Michigan, Elliot Uzelac, was hired as the head coach at the United States Naval Academy. Uzelac asked Vooletich to join him as the defensive coordinator at Navy, and Vooletich agreed. Vooletich remained at Navy as the defensive coordinator for three seasons from 1987 to 1989. While serving as the defensive coordinator for Navy in 1987, Vooletich told The Washington Post', "Football is a very simple game. You work within the structure of the offense and the defense and carry out your assignments, good things are going to happen."

=== University of Iowa ===
In 1990, Vooletich was hired by the University of Iowa as the defensive ends coach under Hayden Fry. Vooletich was credited by Sports Illustrated in 1990 with "a good deal of the credit" in leading the Iowa Hawkeyes to the 1990 Big Ten championship. Vooletich coached the defensive ends at Iowa from 1990 to 1995, and Iowa played in four bowl games during his years there, including the 1991 Rose Bowl.

In January 1996, Iowa coach Hayden Fry told reporters that he had hired a new defensive coordinator and added, "I don't anticipate Milan being back. Un-unh." The following day, Vooletich told reporters he wanted to stay at Iowa, but that seemed unlikely based on Fry's comment. Vooletich said he did not know what was going on: "I'll be damned if I know. He might think I'm looking for a job, but I'm not. I'm going to sit down and talk with him and find out what the hell is going on. ... This has just devastated me." Several days later, Vooletich announced his resignation saying, "I've enjoyed my tenure at Iowa" and adding, "I'll leave Iowa with nothing but good memories."

=== University of Kentucky ===
Vooletich's final coaching position was in 1996 as the linebackers coach at the University of Kentucky under Bill Curry.

=== Later years and family ===
Vooletich was married for 42 years to Rosemary Loughman Vooletich. They had two children, Brian and Dan, both of whom played college football. Their older son, Dan Vooletich, played for the University of North Carolina and later went into coaching. Their younger son, Brian Vooletich, played at North Carolina and later at Michigan State University. In 1996, Vooletich coached against his son, Brian, when Iowa played against Michigan State. Vooletich said at the time, "I just want to watch the kid play. He's a heck of a young man. His mother has done a great job of raising him."

After retiring from coaching, Vooletich lived in Missouri City, Texas. He died in San Antonio, Texas, in October 2006 at age 65.
