= 1979 Rose Bowl =

American college football game

- 65th Rose Bowl Game
Michigan Wolverines	USC Trojans
(10–1)	(11–1)
10	17
Head coach: Bo Schembechler	Head coach: John Robinson
AP / Coaches; 5 / 5	AP / Coaches; 3 / 3
	1	2	3	4	Total
Michigan	0	3	7	0	10
USC	7	10	0	0	17
- Date: January 1, 1979
- Season: 1978
- Stadium: Rose Bowl
- Location: Pasadena, California
- MVP: Charles White (USC RB); Rick Leach (Michigan QB)
- Favorite: USC by 5 points
- Referee: Paul Kamanski (Pac-10); split crew: Pac-10, Big Ten)
- Attendance: 105,629

United States TV coverage
- Network: NBC
- Announcers: Curt Gowdy, John Brodie, and O. J. Simpson
- Nielsen ratings: 23.3

The 1979 Rose Bowl was a college football bowl game played in Pasadena, California, on January 1, 1979. It was the 65th Rose Bowl Game. The USC Trojans, champions of the Pacific-10 Conference, defeated the Michigan Wolverines, (co) champions of the Big Ten Conference, 17–10. USC running back Charles White and Michigan quarterback Rick Leach were named the Players of the Game.

== Teams ==
=== Michigan ===
Michigan came into the game ranked fifth in both major polls with a 10–1 record, with their only loss to Michigan State. The Wolverines tied for the Big Ten title with Michigan State, and earned the Rose Bowl berth because the Spartans were on probation. Michigan had been to the previous two Rose Bowls, but lost both.

=== USC ===
USC came into the game ranked third in both major polls with an 11–1 record. In September, USC decisively defeated then #1 ranked Alabama 24–14 in Birmingham, but subsequently suffered their lone defeat to new Pac-10 member Arizona State, falling 20–7 in Tempe in mid-October. USC defeated UCLA 17–10 to win the Pac-10, and then closed out the regular season by defeating defending national champion Notre Dame 27–25. USC had also defeated Big-10 regular season co-champion Michigan State 30–9 in late September. The Trojans entered the game as five-point favorites.

== Charles White's "Phantom Touchdown" ==
USC had driven deep into Michigan territory in the second quarter. At the three-yard line in a dive over the middle towards the goal-line, Charles White was hit hard by Michigan's great middle linebacker Ron Simpkins and fumbled the ball before he entered the end-zone. The ball was recovered by co-captain linebacker Jerry Meter. The officials for this game were made up of a Pac-10/Big Ten crew. Upon White's fumble, the umpire (a Pac-10 official) immediately and correctly marked the ball around the one-yard line and signaled that there had been a change of possession. Then the line judge, a Big Ten official, came running in raising his hands signaling that White had scored a touchdown. This touchdown has become known as White's "Phantom Touchdown" as he was awarded the score after first fumbling, and entered the end-zone without the ball. This has been confirmed by White himself.

The touchdown put USC up 14–3 and they added a field goal before halftime. The only score in the second half was an extended play by Michigan in the third quarter that resulted in a 44-yard touchdown pass.

== Earthquake ==
A mild earthquake, 4.6 on the Richter scale, took place shortly before halftime but caused no disruptions.

== Scoring ==
First quarter

- USC - Hoby Brenner, 9-yard pass from Paul McDonald (Frank Jordan kick)

Second quarter

- Michigan - Gregg Willner, 36-yard field goal
- USC - Charles White, 3-yard run (Frank Jordan kick)
- USC - Frank Jordan, 35-yard field goal

Third quarter

- Michigan - Roosevelt Smith, 44-yard pass from Rick Leach (Gregg Willner kick)

Fourth quarter

- No scoring

== Aftermath ==
Earlier in the day at the Sugar Bowl in New Orleans, #2 Alabama upset #1 Penn State, 14–7. USC vaulted into the #1 spot in the UPI poll, while Alabama was first in the AP poll.

The loss was Michigan's third straight in the Rose Bowl and fourth consecutive in major bowls; their most recent postseason win was in January 1965. Two years later, they returned to Pasadena and won the Rose Bowl.

This was the fifth straight win for the Pac-10 in the Rose Bowl and ninth in the last ten. USC returned the following year and successfully defended their title.

This was the final Rose Bowl for television broadcaster Curt Gowdy; Dick Enberg took over play-by-play duties the following year.
