= Curtis Greer =

American football player (born 1957)

No. 75
- Position: Defensive end

Personal information
- Born: November 10, 1957 (age 68); Detroit, Michigan, U.S.
- Listed height: 6 ft 4 in (1.93 m)
- Listed weight: 255 lb (116 kg)

Career information
- High school: Cass Tech (Detroit)
- College: Michigan (1976–1979)
- NFL draft: 1980: 1st round, 6th overall pick

Career history
- St. Louis Cardinals (1980–1988); Minnesota Vikings (1989)

Awards and highlights
- First-team All-American (1979); 2× First-team All-Big Ten (1978, 1979)

Career NFL statistics
- Sacks: 69.5
- Fumble recoveries: 9
- Stats at Pro Football Reference

Curtis Greer (born November 10, 1957) is an American former professional football player who was a defensive end in the National Football League (NFL) for the St. Louis Cardinals from 1980 to 1987. He was a top pass-rusher in the early 1980s before his career was curtailed by knee problems, missing an entire year in 1986. He played college football as a defensive tackle for the Michigan Wolverines from 1976 to 1979 and was selected by the Cardinals in the first round (sixth overall pick) of the 1980 NFL draft.

== Early life ==
Greer was born in Detroit, Michigan, in 1957. He played high school football at Detroit's Cass Technical High School, graduating in 1975.

== University of Michigan ==
Greer enrolled at the University of Michigan in 1975 and played college football as a defensive tackle for Bo Schembechler's Michigan Wolverines football teams from 1976 to 1979. He had been planning to attend Michigan State University, but decided to follow several of his high school teammates to the University of Michigan. He played defensive tackle at Michigan. Greer was a 1979 All-America selection. He had 11 sacks his sophomore and junior year. He set a Michigan record for tackles-for-a-loss in a season (21) and career (48). He was a two-time First-team All-Big Ten Conference selection (1978, 1979) and helped lead the Wolverines to three conference championships and four bowl games.

== NFL career ==
Greer was the first pick from the Cardinals when he went sixth overall in the 1980 NFL draft. He missed a few games in his rookie season after suffering a concussion and ended the season in injured reserve after breaking his thumb in a loss against the Philadelphia Eagles. He recorded 30 sacks in 1983–84 and 37.5 in a 41-game stretch of the strike-shortened 1982 season and from 1983 to 1985, whose total was the second best in the National Football League for that period, behind Dexter Manley of the Washington Redskins. In 1983, he had 16 sacks, second in the National Football Conference, behind future Pro Football Hall of Famer Fred Dean. He had 4.5 sacks in the final game of the season against the Philadelphia Eagles. In 1984 Greer was named a second-team All-NFC selection by UPI and finished third in the league with 14 sacks while starting in 52 consecutive games. He played the final five games of the 1985 season with swelling in his right knee, and led his team in sacks the first six years in the league.

He underwent knee surgery prior to the start of the 1986 season and was expected to miss the first six weeks of the season. However, the extent of the injuries to his knee proved to be significant and he missed the entire 1986 season. He developed early signs of rheumatoid arthritis in his good knee, ligament damage in his other knee and fluid in his ankle. He was expected to retire by the Cardinals staff prior to the start of the 1987 season, but he decided to return for a final year, despite doctors warnings about his knee. He was among the players who crossed the picket line during the 1987 NFL strike. That year, he played in 10 games, starting nine of them and recorded six sacks. He retired at season's end.
