= Jerry Meter =

American football player and coach

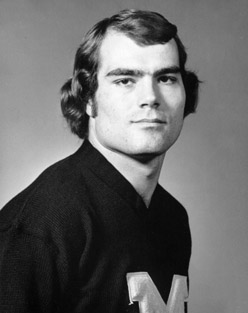

Playing career
- 1976–1978: Michigan
- Positions: Linebacker, defensive end

Coaching career (HC unless noted)
- 1980–1987: Michigan (assistant)

Accomplishments and honors

Awards
- Second-team All-Big Ten (1978)

Jerry Meter (born c. 1957) is an American former football player and coach.

Meter's father, Bernard Meter, played football for Notre Dame in the 1940s.

Jerry Meter attended Bloomfield Hills Andover High School where, at 6 foot, 4 inches, he was selected as a first-team end on the Detroit Free Press All Metro Team in 1974. He enrolled at the University of Michigan and played linebacker for Bo Schembechler from 1976 to 1978. In 1977, he received the Frederick Matthaei Award leadership, drive and achievement on the athletic field and in the classroom. He was also selected as the co-captain of the 1978 Michigan Wolverines football team. He was also selected by both the Associated Press and the United Press International as a second-team defensive end on the 1978 All-Big Ten Conference football team. Meter's last game for Michigan was the 1979 Rose Bowl against the USC. Meter played a key role in the famous "phantom touchdown" incident in the 1979 Rose Bowl. USC's Charles White fumbled the ball near the goal line, and Meter recovered the ball at the one-yard line. Replays showed that White had fumbled before crossing the goal line, but officials called it a touchdown, and USC won the game, 17–10.

Meter returned to Michigan as an assistant football coach for eight years from 1980 to 1987.

Meter worked for Steelcase Inc., starting in 1987. He lives in Bloomfield Hills, Michigan with his wife, Lisa. They have four children: Nick, Erin, Meggie, and Ben.
