= Keena Turner =

American football player and executive

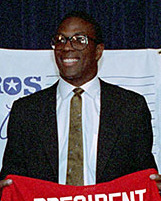
- Turner in 1986

San Francisco 49ers
- Title: Vice president Senior advisor to the general manager

Personal information
- Born: October 22, 1958 (age 68); Chicago, Illinois, U.S.
- Listed height: 6 ft 2 in (1.88 m)
- Listed weight: 219 lb (99 kg)

Career information
- Position: Linebacker (No. 58)
- High school: Chicago Vocational
- College: Purdue
- NFL draft: 1980: 2nd round, 39th overall pick

Career history

Playing
- San Francisco 49ers (1980–1990)

Coaching
- Stanford (1992–1994) Linebackers coach

Operations
- San Francisco 49ers (2001–2003) Player development director; San Francisco 49ers (2004–2005) Alumni coordinator; San Francisco 49ers (2006–2007) Director of alumni coordinators; San Francisco 49ers (2008–2017) Vice president of football affairs; San Francisco 49ers (2018–present) Vice president & senior advisor to the general manager

Awards and highlights
- 4× Super Bowl champion (XVI, XIX, XXIII, XXIV); Pro Bowl (1985); 2× First-team All-Big Ten (1978, 1979)

Career NFL statistics
- Games: 153
- Games started: 118
- Sacks: 19.5
- Interceptions: 11
- Stats at Pro Football Reference

Keena Turner (born October 22, 1958) is an American professional football executive and former player, coach, and broadcaster. He was selected by the San Francisco 49ers in the second round of the 1980 NFL draft. A 6'2" 237 pound linebacker from Purdue University, Turner played in 11 NFL seasons and spent his entire career with the 49ers. A one-time Pro Bowl selection, he retired from the 49ers with four Super Bowl rings. Turner famously played Super Bowl XVI with the chickenpox.

After his playing career ended, Turner served as a television co-host for 49ers pre-season games. Currently he serves as the team's vice president and senior advisor to the general manager. Turner and his wife Linda have three children, Sheena, Miles, and Ella.

Turner previously owned a car dealership in Tracy, California with former teammate Ronnie Lott.

== Coaching career ==
From 1992 to 1994 Turner coached linebackers at Stanford under Bill Walsh.
