= Mark Brammer =

American football player (born 1958)

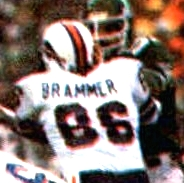
- Brammer (86) with the Buffalo Bills in 1981

No. 86
- Position: Tight end

Personal information
- Born: May 3, 1958 (age 68); Traverse City, Michigan, U.S.
- Listed height: 6 ft 3 in (1.91 m)
- Listed weight: 238 lb (108 kg)

Career information
- High school: Traverse City (MI)
- College: Michigan State
- NFL draft: 1980: 3rd round, 67th overall pick

Career history
- Buffalo Bills (1980–1984); Detroit Lions (1986)*
- * Offseason or practice squad member only

Awards and highlights
- First-team All-American (1978); Second-team All-American (1979); 2× First-team All-Big Ten (1978, 1979); Second-team All-Big Ten (1977)

Career NFL statistics
- Receptions: 116
- Receiving yards: 1,137
- Touchdowns: 10
- Stats at Pro Football Reference

Mark Dewitt Brammer (born May 3, 1958) is an American former professional football player who was a tight end in the National Football League (NFL) for five seasons for the Buffalo Bills. He is #60 on the list of Michigan's Greatest High School Football Players.
