= 1978 All-Big Ten Conference football team =

American college football all-star team

The 1978 All-Big Ten Conference football team consists of American football players chosen by various organizations for All-Big Ten Conference teams for the 1978 Big Ten Conference football season. The only player unanimously selected by the conference coaches as a first-team player was Michigan fullback Russell Davis. Michigan State flanker Kirk Gibson fell one point short of unanimity, and running back Marion Barber, Jr., fell two points short.

== Offensive selections ==
=== Quarterbacks ===
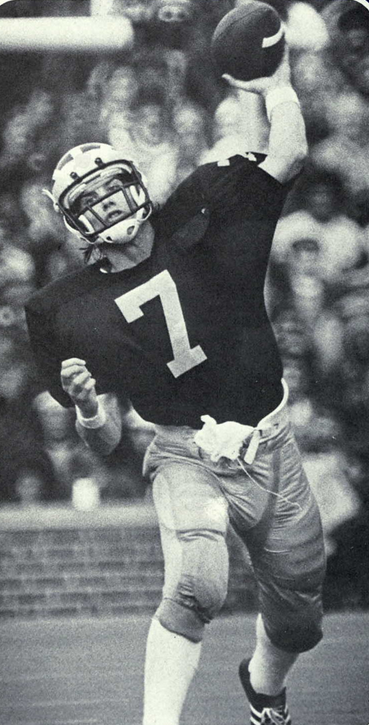
Quarterback Rick Leach

- Rick Leach, Michigan (AP-1; UPI-1)
- Ed Smith, Michigan State (AP-2; UPI-2)

=== Running backs ===
- Marion Barber, Jr., Minnesota (AP-1; UPI-1 [tailback])
- Russell Davis, Michigan (AP-1; UPI-1 [fullback])
- Mike Harkrader, Indiana (AP-2, UPI-2 [tailback])
- John Macon, Purdue (AP-2; UPI-2 [fullback])

=== Flankers/split ends ===
- Kirk Gibson, Michigan State (AP-1 [flanker]; UPI-1 [wingback])
- Eugene Byrd, Michigan State (AP-1 [wide receiver]; UPI-1 [split end])
- Brad Reid, Iowa (AP-2 [wide receiver])
- David Charles, Wisconsin (AP-2 [flanker]; UPI-2 [split end])
- Ralph Clayton (UPI-2 [wingback])

=== Tight ends ===
- Mark Brammer, Michigan State (AP-1; UPI-1)
- Doug Marsh, Michigan (AP-2)
- Jimmy Moore, Ohio State (UPI-2)

=== Centers ===
- Mark Heidel, Indiana (AP-1; UPI-1)
- Steve Nauta, Michigan (AP-2; UPI-2)

=== Guards ===
- Ken Fritz, Ohio State (AP-1; UPI-1)
- John Arbeznik, Michigan (AP-2 [tackle]; UPI-1)
- Greg Bartnick, Michigan (AP-2, UPI-2)
- Dale Schwan, Purdue (AP-2)
- John LeFeber, Purdue (UPI-2)

=== Tackles ===
- Jon Giesler, Michigan (AP-1 [guard]; UPI-1)
- Jim Hinsley, Michigan State (AP-1; UPI-1)
- Joe Robinson, Ohio State (AP-1)
- Steve McKenzie, Purdue (AP-2, UPI-2)
- Keith Ferguson, Ohio State (UPI-2)

== Defensive selections ==
=== Defensive linemen ===
- Curtis Greer, Michigan (AP-1; UPI-1)
- Melvin Land, Michigan State (AP-1; UPI-1)
- Ken Loushin, Purdue (AP-1; UPI-1)
- Keena Turner, Purdue (AP-1; UPI-1)
- Kelton Dansler, Ohio State (AP-1; UPI-2 [defensive end])
- Stan Sytsma, Minnesota (AP-2; UPI-1)
- Marcus Jackson, Purdue (AP-2; UPI-2 [defensive tackle])
- Jerry Meter, Michigan (AP-2; UPI-2 [defensive end])
- Dan Relich, Wisconsin (AP-2)
- Jim Ronan, Minnesota (AP-2)
- Byron Cato, Ohio State (UPI-2 [defensive tackle])
- Doug Friberg, Minnesota (UPI-2 [defensive guard])

=== Linebackers ===
- Tom Cousineau, Ohio State (AP-1; UPI-1)
- Joe Norman, Indiana (AP-1; UPI-1)
- Ron Simpkins, Michigan (AP-1; UPI-2)
- Dan Bass, Michigan State (AP-2)
- Tom Rusk, Iowa (AP-2; UPI-2)
- John Sullivan, Illinois (AP-2)

=== Defensive backs ===
- Mike Jolly, Michigan (AP-1; UPI-1)
- Tom Graves, Michigan State (AP-1; UPI-2)
- Vince Skillings, Ohio State (AP-1; UPI-2)
- Keith Brown, Minnesota (UPI-1)
- Mike Guess, Ohio State (UPI-1)
- Mike Harden, Michigan (UPI-1)
- Mark Anderson, Michigan State (AP-2; UPI-2)
- Dave Abrams, Indiana (AP-2)
- Pat Geegan, Northwestern (AP-2)
- Lawrence Johnson, Wisconsin (UPI-2)

== Special teams ==
=== Placekicker ===
- Paul Rogind, Minnesota (AP-1; UPI-1)
- Scott Sovereen, Purdue (AP-2)
- Greg Willner, Michigan (UPI-2)

=== Punter ===
- Ray Stachowicz, Michigan State (AP-2; UPI-1)
- Tom Orosz, Ohio State (AP-1; UPI-2)

== Key ==
AP = Associated Press

UPI = United Press International, selected by the Big Ten Conference coaches

== See also ==
- 1978 College Football All-America Team
