= Doug Marsh =

American football player (born 1958)

No. 87, 80, 82
- Position: Tight end

Personal information
- Born: June 18, 1958 (age 68); Akron, Ohio, U.S.
- Listed height: 6 ft 3 in (1.91 m)
- Listed weight: 236 lb (107 kg)

Career information
- High school: East (Akron)
- College: Michigan
- NFL draft: 1980: 2nd round, 33rd overall pick

Career history
- St. Louis Cardinals (1980–1986); Atlanta Falcons (1987)*; Indianapolis Colts (1988)*
- * Offseason or practice squad member only

Awards and highlights
- 2× Second-team All-Big Ten (1978, 1979)

Career NFL statistics
- Receptions: 167
- Receiving yards: 2,140
- Touchdowns: 19
- Stats at Pro Football Reference

Douglas Walter Marsh (born June 18, 1958) is an American former professional football player who was a tight end for seven seasons for the St. Louis Cardinals from 1980 to 1986. He also played college football for the Michigan Wolverines from 1976 to 1979. He was selected as a first-team All-Big Ten Conference tight end at the end of the 1979 season.

== Early life ==
A native of Akron, Ohio, Marsh played high school football for Akron East High School. In August 1976, he played for the Ohio all-star team in the Big 33 Football Classic, known as the "Super Bowl of High School Football", against the Pennsylvania all-stars.

== Michigan ==
Marsh accepted a football scholarship from the University of Michigan and played for the Michigan Wolverines football team under head coach Bo Schembechler from 1976 to 1979. During his time at Michigan, Marsh caught 57 passes for 947 yards and 10 touchdowns. His longest reception at Michigan was a 71-yard reception against Wisconsin in 1979. He also scored two touchdowns on passes from Rick Leach in Michigan's 1978 victory over defending national champion Notre Dame in the first game between the two schools since 1943. As a senior in 1979, Marsh was regarded as one of the two best tight end in the Big Ten Conference. started all 12 games at tight end for Michigan and was the Wolverines leading receiver with 33 receptions for 612 yards; Anthony Carter was the second-leading receiver with 17 catches for 462 yards. At the end of the 1979 season, Marsh was selected as a first-team All-Big Ten player, a third-team All-American, and a player in the January 1981 Hula Bowl.

== Professional football ==
Marsh was selected by the Cardinals in the second round (33rd overall pick) of the 1980 NFL draft. He signed with the Cardinals in May 1980. His contract was for seven years and was "estimated to be worth $1.3 million."

As a rookie in 1980, Marsh was the Cardinals' starting tight end in all 16 regular season games. In his first three NFL games, he caught nine passes for 120 yards and two touchdowns. Marsh's playing time was limited in his second year in the NFL. On August 29, 1981, he sustained an injury to knee ligaments during the last preseason game and missed the first four games of the 1981 season. Marsh returned to the Cardinals as their starting tight end in early October 1981, but he dislocated a hip while pursuing an onside kick during the Cardinals' 30-17 victory over the Minnesota Vikings on October 25, 1981. As a result of the injuries, Marsh missed 12 games during the 1981 season. He returned in 1982 as the team's starting tight end and held that position for the next five seasons. His best year was 1984 when he caught 39 passes for 608 yards and five touchdowns. In June 1987, Marsh was released by the Cardinals. The team's head coach Gene Stallings noted that Marsh was the only quarterback, tight end or receiver who did not attend the entirety of an eight-day passing game school conducted by the team and added, "When that happened, I just could not go to bat for him." Marsh noted at the time that he had felt that for the prior two years he had been "in between a rock and a hard place with the Cardinals."

Marsh played a total of seven season for the Cardinals from 1980 to 1986. He appeared in 92 games, 90 of them as the team's starting tight end. Over the course of his NFL career, he caught 167 passes for 2,140 yards and 19 touchdowns.

Marsh signed a contract with the Atlanta Falcons in July 1987, reuniting with former Cardinals head coach Jim Hanifan who had taken over as the Falcons' offensive coordinator. Marsh was released by the Falcons after the first week of September 1987, and he did not appear in any regular season games for the team. In November 1987, he tried out for the New England Patriots. Marsh signed with the Indianapolis Colts in the spring of 1988 and played with them through the preseason, but he was cut at the end of August.

== NFL career statistics ==
Legend
| **Bold** | Career high |

=== Regular season ===
| Year | Team | Games | | Receiving | | | | |
| Year | Team | GP | GS | Rec | Yds | Avg | Lng | TD |
|---|---|---|---|---|---|---|---|---|
| 1980 | STL | **16** | **16** | 22 | 269 | 12.2 | 29 | 4 |
| 1981 | STL | 4 | 3 | 6 | 80 | 13.3 | 20 | 1 |
| 1982 | STL | 8 | 8 | 6 | 94 | **15.7** | 21 | 0 |
| 1983 | STL | **16** | **16** | 32 | 421 | 13.2 | 38 | **8** |
| 1984 | STL | **16** | **16** | **39** | **608** | 15.6 | **47** | 5 |
| 1985 | STL | **16** | **16** | 37 | 355 | 9.6 | 23 | 1 |
| 1986 | STL | **16** | 15 | 25 | 313 | 12.5 | 27 | 0 |
| | | 92 | 90 | 167 | 2,140 | 12.8 | 47 | 19 |

=== Playoffs ===
| Year | Team | Games | | Receiving | | | | |
| Year | Team | GP | GS | Rec | Yds | Avg | Lng | TD |
|---|---|---|---|---|---|---|---|---|
| 1982 | STL | 1 | 1 | 2 | 18 | 9.0 | 17 | 0 |
| | | 1 | 1 | 2 | 18 | 9.0 | 17 | 0 |
