= Harlan Huckleby =

American football player (born 1957)

No. 32, 25
- Positions: Running back, kick returner

Personal information
- Born: December 30, 1957 (age 68); Detroit, Michigan, U.S.
- Listed height: 6 ft 1 in (1.85 m)
- Listed weight: 199 lb (90 kg)

Career information
- High school: Cass Technical (Detroit)
- College: Michigan
- NFL draft: 1979: 5th round, 120th overall pick

Career history
- Saskatchewan Roughriders (1979); Green Bay Packers (1980–1985)

Awards and highlights
- Second-team All-Big Ten (1977); All-American (1976, 4 × 400 m); Big Ten indoor 4 × 400 Champion; Big Ten Indoor Team Champion; Big Ten Outdoor Team Champion

Career NFL statistics
- Rushing yards: 779
- Receiving yards: 411
- Kickoff return yards: 1300
- Stats at Pro Football Reference

Harlan Charles Huckleby (born December 30, 1957) is an American former professional football player who was a running back and kick returner for the Green Bay Packers of the National Football League (NFL). He was selected by the New Orleans Saints in the fifth round of the 1979 NFL draft. Over the course of his NFL career he accumulated nearly 2500 all-purpose yards, with over half of that being return yards. He played college football for the Michigan Wolverines, winning three Big Ten Conference championships. He also was a member of the Wolverines track team for one season where he became a Big Ten champion and All-American as a member of the 4 × 400 m relay race team. He had also been a four-time Michigan High School Athletic Association (MHSAA) state champion in track and field. He played high school football at Cass Technical High School, graduating in 1975.

== High school ==
At Cass Technical High School he won the Class A MHSAA 220 yard dash both as a junior in 1974 and a senior in 1975. As a senior, he also won the state championship in the 100 yard dash and the 4 × 110 yard relay as a senior in 1975. He also competed in the Amateur Athletic Union Junior Championships in 1974 placing fifth in the 440 yard dash.

== College ==
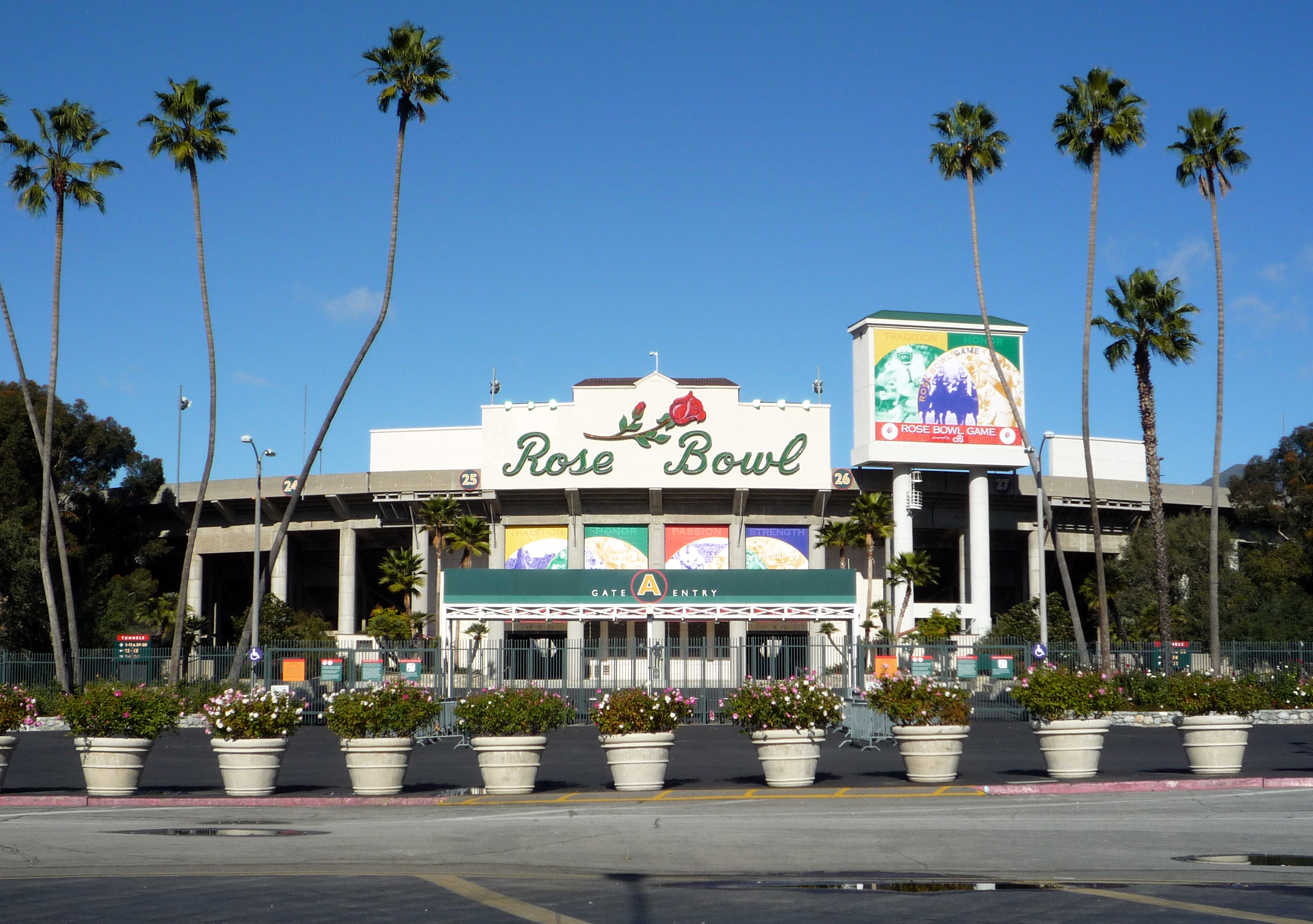
Huckleby appeared in three Rose Bowls.

Huckleby started 30 games for Bo Schembechler's consecutive Big Ten Conference champion Michigan Wolverines from the 1976 through 1978 seasons. During his Michigan Wolverines career he accumulated a total of 2624 yards rushing, including twenty-five touchdowns and nine 100-yard games. He saw limited action in his three Rose Bowls. When the Wolverines beat Northwestern Wildcats, 69–0, in week six of the 1975 season it was the first time in Michigan history that the Wolverines had three backs who each rushed for at least 100 yards. Harlan Huckleby gained 157 yards, and Michigan tied the modern Big Ten record of 573 rushing yards in the game. Huckleby was the leading rusher for Michigan in both of the games in which Michigan had three rushers accumulate 100 yards.

In track, Huckleby was a member of the 1976 Men's track team. The Men won the Big Ten Conference titles in both indoor and outdoor track that season. Huckleby's 4 × 400 m relay team won the indoor Big Ten Championship race and placed third at the National Collegiate Athletic Association Championships. Huckleby earned All-American honors for this. Although the team won both Big Ten track titles in 1978 Huckleby was not a member of the team.

== Professional career ==
He was drafted 120th overall in the fifth round of the 1979 NFL draft by the New Orleans Saints. He did not play for the Saints during the 1979 NFL season, but instead played for the CFL's Saskatchewan Roughriders for eight games in 1979. He played for the Green Bay Packers during the 1980-1985 NFL seasons. During 84 games over the course of six seasons, Huckleby accumulated ten touchdowns and 779 yards rushing on 242 carries, three touchdowns and 411 yards on 53 receptions, and 1300 kickoff return yards. Although he only totaled 13 career NFL touchdowns in his 84 games, he scored multiple touchdowns a few times, including three in one game once. During the 1981 NFL season, his 5 rushing touchdowns led the Packers and his 8 total touchdowns tied for the team lead with James Lofton. During his first four seasons with Bart Starr as coach the team reached the playoffs once. The team did not reach the playoffs either of his final two seasons with Forrest Gregg as coach. During the 1982 NFL season the Packers reached the second round of the 1982-83 NFL Playoffs.

== See also ==
- Lists of Michigan Wolverines football rushing leaders
