= The Ten Year War =

College football rivalry

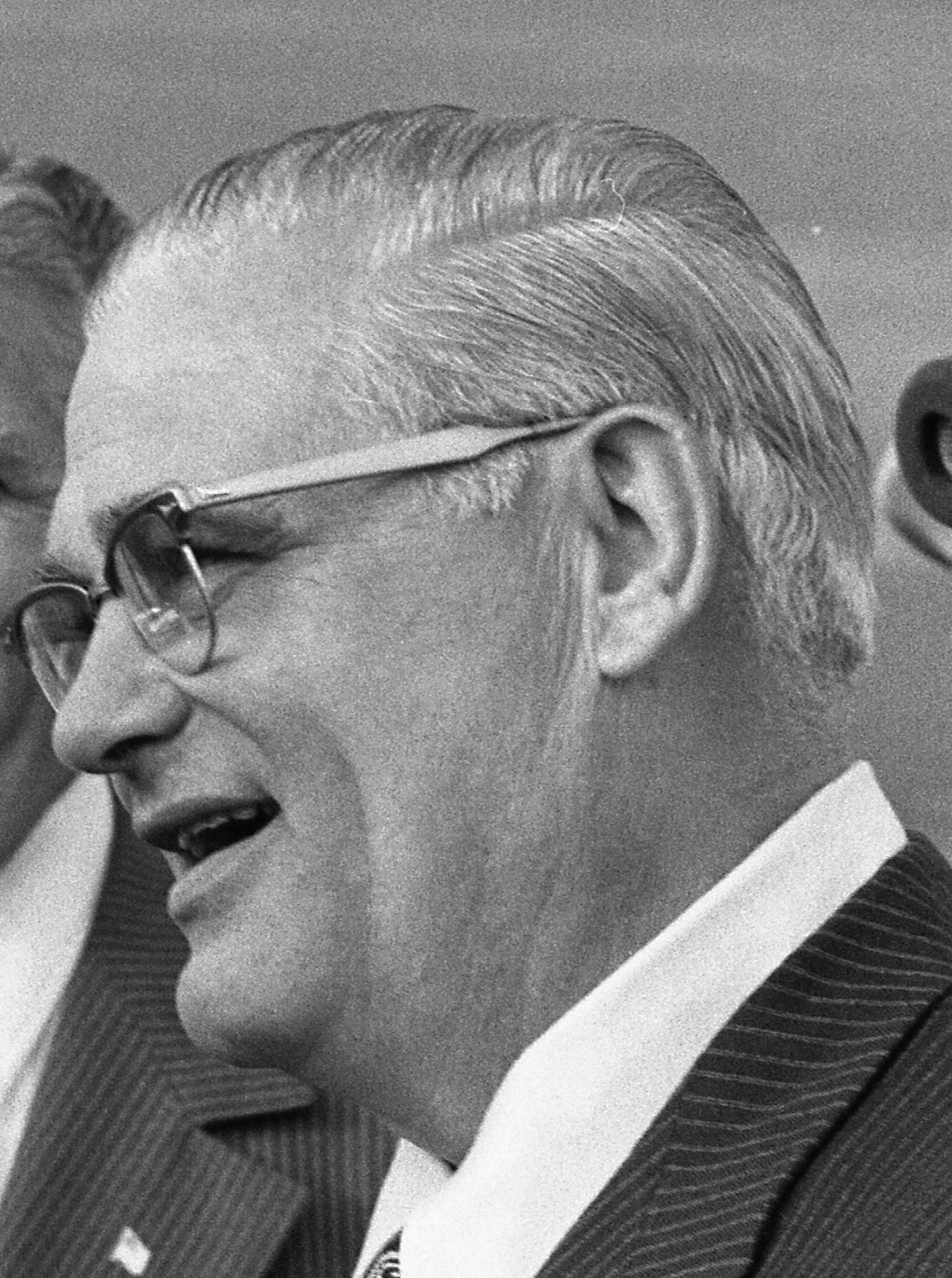
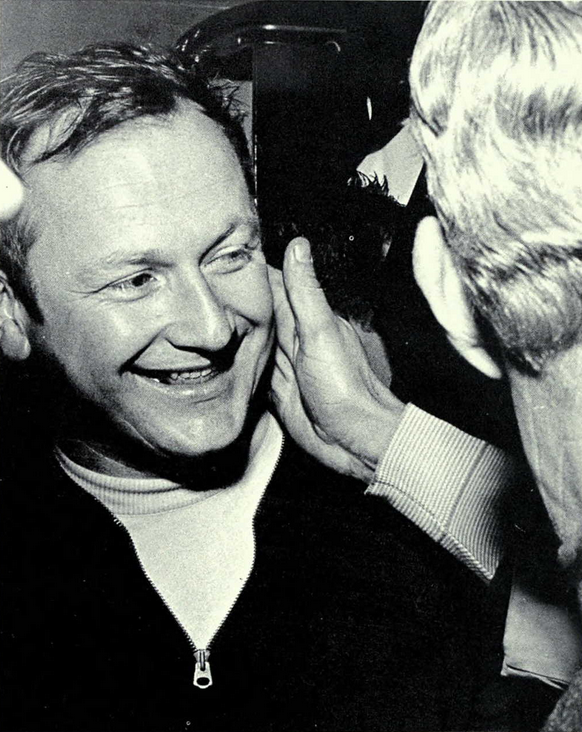
Woody Hayes (left/top) and Bo Schembechler (right/bottom)

The Ten Year War was a series of college football games, played from 1969 to 1978, in the Michigan–Ohio State football rivalry that pitted coach Woody Hayes of the Ohio State Buckeyes against coach Bo Schembechler of the Michigan Wolverines. In most contests, the Big Ten conference championship and a trip to the Rose Bowl were at stake, and in some cases, a possible national championship.

== Background ==
The University of Michigan in Ann Arbor, and Ohio State University in Columbus are separated by just 180 miles (290 km), and had enjoyed a rivalry in football that began in 1897 and has been renewed annually since Michigan rejoined the Big Ten in 1918.

Wayne Woodrow (Woody) Hayes was a former tackle at Denison University, before he worked as a high school coach and enlisted in the Navy. After World War II ended, he was chosen as head coach at his alma mater, where he won two division titles and won 19 straight games before he took over the Miami of Ohio program in 1949, won a Mid-American Conference title, and became head coach at Ohio State in 1951.

While at Oxford, Hayes coached a tackle by the name of Glenn Edward (Bo) Schembechler. Schembechler would graduate from Miami in 1951 and serve as a graduate assistant to Hayes at Ohio State the following year. After stints in the Army and serving as an assistant coach at Presbyterian College, Bowling Green and Northwestern, Schembechler was hired by Hayes to be an assistant in Columbus, where he remained as an offensive line coach until he became head coach at Miami of Ohio in 1963.

While Hayes accumulated five Big Ten titles at Ohio State and won Rose Bowls (and national championships) in 1954, 1957, and 1968, Schembechler coached six winning seasons at Miami, winning back-to-back Mid-American Conference titles in 1965 and 1966, and finishing as runner-up three more times.

Between 1951 and 1968 under Hayes, the Buckeyes won 12 of 18 contests against Michigan, including a 1957 victory in Michigan Stadium, the first game in the series attended by over 100,000 fans. In 1958, Ohio State had a 20–14 lead towards the end of the game. On the final play, Michigan fullback Gene Sisinyak ran the ball from the one-yard line for what might have been a game-winning touchdown, but Ohio State defensive tackle Dick Schafrath hit Sisinyak, forcing a fumble. In the 1968 game, Ohio State won 50–14, outscoring its foe 29–0 in the second half and attempting an unsuccessful two-point conversion attempt on its final touchdown. When asked why he went for two points with an already insurmountable 50–14 lead, Hayes said, "Because I couldn't go for three." The victory gave top-ranked Ohio State the Big Ten title for the first time in seven years en route to an AP national championship.

After the 1968 season, Schembechler was hired to coach at Michigan, a once-proud program that had fallen on hard times. Going into the 1969 season, the Buckeyes had narrowed the series margin to 37–24–4. Thus, the stage was set for the first of a decade of clashes between coach and player.

== The games ==
=== 1969: Michigan 24, Ohio State 12 ===
The Start of The Ten-Year War
Ohio State Buckeyes	Michigan Wolverines
(8–0)	(7–2)
12	24
Head coach: Woody Hayes	Head coach: Bo Schembechler
AP / Coaches; 1 / 1	AP / Coaches; 12 / 12
	1	2	3	4	Total
Ohio State	6	6	0	0	12
Michigan	7	17	0	0	24
- Date: November 22, 1969
- Season: 1969
- Stadium: Michigan Stadium
- Location: Ann Arbor, Michigan

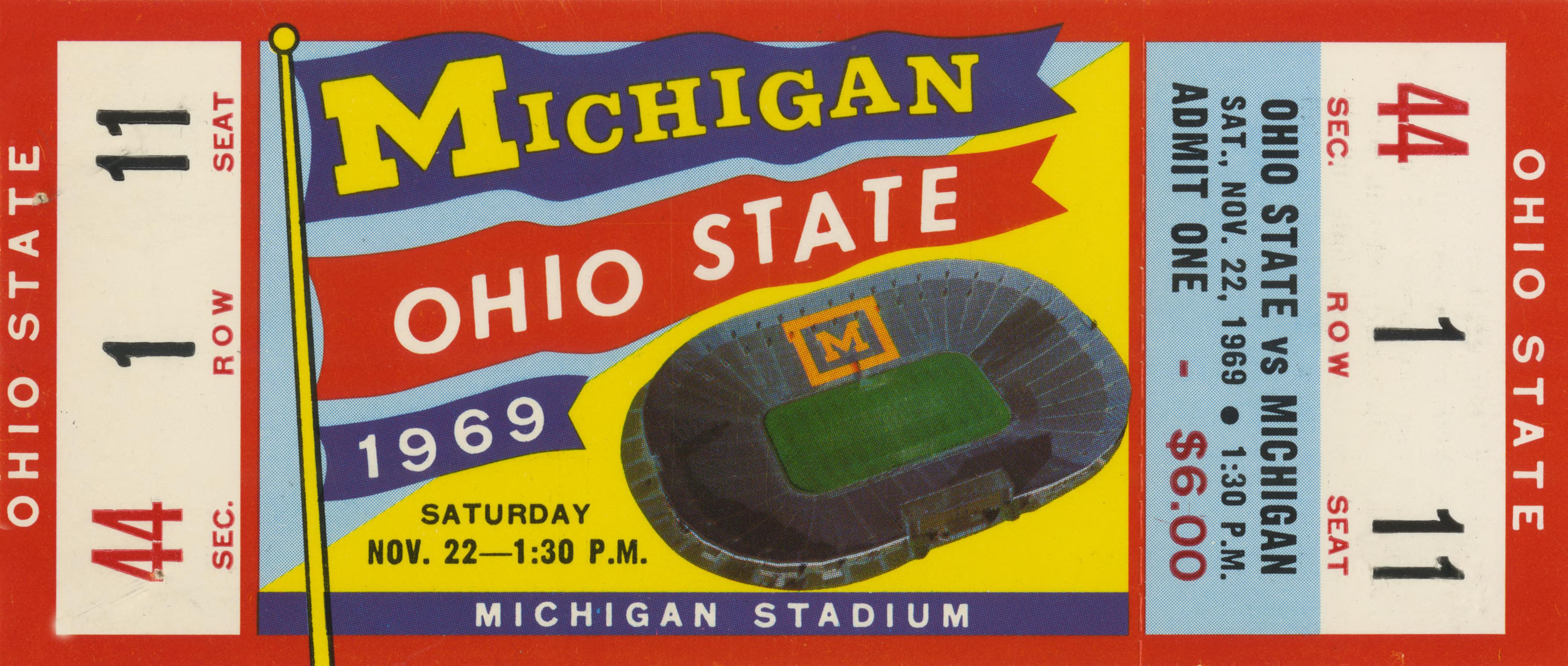
Ticket for the November 22, 1969 game

Ohio State's 1969 team was dubbed by the media as the "greatest college football team of all time", with a handful of proven All-Big Ten players and All-Americans. They were returning national champions, Hayes’ third title as head coach. No team had come within four touchdowns of, or scored more than 21 points on Ohio State all season. The Wolverines were 7–2 and ranked #12, having lost to Missouri and cross-state rival Michigan State. Going into the contest, the Buckeyes were favored by 17 points.

A then-record Michigan Stadium crowd of 103,588 watched Ohio State score first, but Michigan would respond with a touchdown of its own. The extra point would put the Wolverines up 7–6, and the Buckeyes were behind for the first time in 1969. Ohio State would take the lead again as the second quarter began with a touchdown. Hayes went for the two-point conversion and missed, for a 12–7 score. Michigan responded again with a 67-yard scoring drive to put them ahead 14–12, but the key play came on their next possession. Barry Pierson returned an Ohio State punt 60 yards to the Buckeye 3-yard-line. Quarterback Don Moorhead would score two plays later on the keeper to extend Michigan's lead to 21–12. Michigan would kick a field goal and go into the locker room with a 24–12 lead.

In the third quarter, the Ohio State offense was uncharacteristically sloppy, with two passes picked off by Pierson. But the Buckeye defense was able to keep Michigan to one first down after each turnover. The fourth quarter began with Hayes pulling quarterback Rex Kern and going to his backup, Ron Maciejowski, who would throw yet another interception to U-M's Pierson. The Ohio State offense would end up committing seven turnovers in the second half, six of them interceptions.

Ohio State had gone to the Rose Bowl the year before and was barred from going again, due to the Big Ten's "no repeat" rule. Schembechler suffered a heart attack the night before the Rose Bowl, which Michigan lost, 10–3, to USC, and finished at No. 9. Ohio State finished at #4.

=== 1970: Ohio State 20, Michigan 9 ===
Woody's Revenge
Michigan Wolverines	Ohio State Buckeyes
(9–0)	(8–0)
9	20
Head coach: Bo Schembechler	Head coach: Woody Hayes
AP / Coaches; 4 / 5	AP / Coaches; 5 / 4
	1	2	3	4	Total
Michigan	0	3	6	0	9
Ohio State	3	7	0	10	20
- Date: November 21, 1970
- Season: 1970
- Stadium: Ohio Stadium
- Location: Columbus, Ohio

Revenge was the buzzword for Ohio State in 1970, with Hayes reportedly beginning preparations as the team traveled back to Columbus following the 1969 upset. Hayes even had a rug made proclaiming the 1969 result, and placed it in the Buckeye locker room, so his players would have to walk on it whenever they went to practice. Going into the Michigan game, the Buckeyes were ranked #5 and undefeated, despite a sometimes-inconsistent offense. The Wolverines, who would not be going to a bowl game due to the Big Ten's Rose Bowl-or-bust and no-repeat rules, also went through the 1970 season without losing, ranked #4.

Ohio State recovered a fumble on Michigan's initial kickoff return, but could only muster a 28-yard field goal by Fred Schram for an early 3–0 lead. The two rivals traded punts throughout the quarter and Michigan had Ohio State pinned on their own 1-yard line after one punt. Near the end of the quarter, Rex Kern threw an interception to Jim Betts, but the Wolverines were also forced to settle for a field goal from Dana Coin to tie it up. In the second quarter, a penalty on a Michigan punt gave the Buckeyes good field position, and they would march the ball down the field in a drive that climaxed with Kern's 25-yard scoring pass to Bruce Jankowski to make it 10–3 OSU. Michigan fumbled on their next possession, but Ohio State was unable to score as time ran out on the half.

The Wolverines would start moving the ball on their first possession of the second half, and Don Moorhead would toss a 13-yard scoring pass to Paul Staroba, but a blocked extra-point try kept the Buckeyes ahead 10–9. Ohio State could not get a first down until near the end of the third quarter, but their ground game began working again and they drove into Wolverine territory. But they settled for another Fred Schram field goal to extend Ohio State's lead to 13–9. Michigan, with a new sense of urgency, tried to switch to an air attack, but they paid the price when Moorhead threw an interception to Stan White, who returned the ball to the Michigan 9. Three plays later, Kern connected with Leo Hayden to extend the Ohio State lead to 20–9 and send the Ohio Stadium crowd into hysterics. The Wolverines started deep in their own end, but couldn't score again, and the Buckeyes ran out the clock, setting the stage for a wild celebration that went well into the Columbus night, including the delivery of a goal post to the lawn of the Ohio Statehouse.

The Buckeyes finished the game with 329 total yards to Michigan's 155. The win propelled Ohio State to #2 in the polls, but they lost the Associated Press national championship with a 27–17 loss to Stanford in the Rose Bowl. The AP title instead went to Nebraska, which defeated LSU in the Orange Bowl. (The coaches voting in the United Press International poll did not conduct a post-bowl poll and awarded its championship to Texas, which lost to Notre Dame in the Cotton Bowl, costing the Longhorns the AP championship).

=== 1971: Michigan 10, Ohio State 7 ===
Bo's Only Unbeaten Season
Ohio State Buckeyes	Michigan Wolverines
(6–3)	(10–0)
7	10
Head coach: Woody Hayes	Head coach: Bo Schembechler
	AP / Coaches; 3 / 3
	1	2	3	4	Total
Ohio State	0	0	7	0	7
Michigan	0	3	0	7	10
- Date: November 20, 1971
- Season: 1971
- Stadium: Michigan Stadium
- Location: Ann Arbor, Michigan

Schembechler had continued Michigan's offensive domination of the Big Ten going into the 1971 game with Ohio State. They went through the season 10–0 and ranked #3, and they would head to Pasadena regardless of the result of "The Game". Out of all their opponents, only Purdue had been able to stay within a touchdown. Three of their victories were shutouts. The Wolverines also led the nation in scoring defense, allowing just over six points a game.

For Woody Hayes, 1971 was the most difficult rebuilding year of his tenure, having lost 17 previous starters to graduation or the NFL. Injuries, which some blamed on the new artificial turf at Ohio Stadium, depleted the squad further. Ohio State had already lost to Colorado, Michigan State and Northwestern and was out of contention for the conference championship (the Buckeyes were already ineligible for the Rose Bowl berth due to the no-repeat rule, which would be repealed following the 1971 season). The Buckeyes were going into Ann Arbor with the notion of playing for pride.

Michigan Stadium was once again jammed with a record crowd of roughly 104,000 as the home team started the game slowly. Quarterback Tom Slade was knocked out on the opening drive and replaced with backup Larry Cipa. On the Buckeyes’ first possession, Tom Campana returned a punt to the Michigan 28, but the scarlet-and-gray fumbled the ball away at the 17. Both teams exchanged possessions well into the second quarter. Slade returned and spearheaded a Michigan drive to the Ohio State 15, where Dana Coin kicked a 32-yard field goal to put UM on top first, 3–0. The maize-and-blue fumbled in the Buckeye red zone on their next possession and halftime came with the score still 3–0.

Defense continued to dominate play in the second half. Neither team was able to score until late in the third quarter, when Campana caught a punt at the OSU 15 and returned it all the way to put the unranked Buckeyes on top 7–3. Time soon became an issue for Michigan as the fourth quarter got underway, and with the stinging defensive tone of the game, Ohio State was poised to get a huge upset. The Wolverines got a crucial first down on a fourth-and-one with 2:45 left. Two plays later, Billy Taylor took a pitch from Cipa and took it 21 yards for a touchdown, which electrified the crowd and put the Wolverines back in the lead 10–7. The Buckeyes then tried a fervent drive to get into field-goal territory. Ohio State quarterback Don Lamka threw the ball on a third-and–16 toward receiver Dick Wakefield, but Michigan's Thom Darden jumped over Wakefield for an interception, effectively killing Ohio State's hope for at least a tie.

The entire Ohio State sideline screamed for an interference penalty to be called, and Hayes stormed onto the field, launched a profanity-laced tirade at the referee, Jerry Markbreit, and tore up the sideline markers, receiving a 15-yard unsportsmanlike conduct penalty. A further enraged Hayes then proceeded to throw the penalty flag into the crowd, began destroying the yard markers and threw the first-down marker into the ground like a javelin before being restrained by Buckeyes team officials; Hayes was then assessed an additional 15-yard penalty and ejected. Hayes was later suspended for one game and fined $1000. As the Wolverines proceeded to run out the clock, OSU linebacker Randy Gradishar was ejected after he slugged Tom Slade through his facemask and starting a ten-minute bench clearing brawl. Michigan fans soon streamed onto the field to celebrate the close call and what would become Schembechler's only unbeaten and untied regular-season team.

Despite the 11–0 regular season, Michigan's national championship hopes were a long shot at best thanks to the presence of undefeated powerhouses at Nebraska and Alabama, as well as an Oklahoma team whose only loss was to Nebraska. Michigan's faint hopes died with an upset defeat to an 8–3 Stanford squad minus 1970 Heisman Trophy recipient Jim Plunkett in the Rose Bowl. The Wolverines fell for a fake punt and eventually lost 13–12 on a last-second field goal. They would finish the season ranked #6. Ohio State would finish unranked for the only time in the ten-year span.

=== 1972: Ohio State 14, Michigan 11 ===
The Double Goal-Line Stops
Michigan Wolverines	Ohio State Buckeyes
(10–0)	(8–1)
11	14
Head coach: Bo Schembechler	Head coach: Woody Hayes
AP / Coaches; 3 / 3	AP / Coaches; 9 / 9
	1	2	3	4	Total
Michigan	0	3	8	0	11
Ohio State	0	7	7	0	14
- Date: November 25, 1972
- Season: 1972
- Stadium: Ohio Stadium
- Location: Columbus, Ohio

As they did after the 1969 upset, the Ohio State coaching staff began working on the 1972 game immediately after losing the ’71 game. The personnel issues that plagued Hayes’ 1971 squad had been alleviated, with junior Greg Hare taking over the signal-calling duties; a freshman phenomenon named Archie Griffin, who set the Ohio State single-game rushing record (in the first year the NCAA made freshmen eligible); and Champ Henson, who led the nation with 19 touchdowns before the Michigan game. Ohio State was 8–1 (the only loss being to Michigan State) and ranked #9. Michigan also had a new quarterback, sophomore Dennis Franklin, along with tailbacks Harry Banks and Chuck Heater, and rusher Ed Shuttlesworth. The Wolverine defense had ranked 4th in the country. Michigan was undefeated and ranked #3.

Another change before the 1972 game concerned the Big Ten's postseason policy. The "no-repeat" rule concerning Rose Bowl trips was abolished, meaning that Michigan could go to Pasadena for the second year in a row with a win or a tie.

Michigan got the ball first on a cold, gloomy November 25 in Columbus, and moved the ball well on its first possession, but couldn't score on the Buckeye defense. That would be the Wolverines’ modus operandi for much of the game. The maize-and-blue finally broke the scoreless tie in the second quarter, on a 35-yard Mike Lantry field goal. Then, Ohio State finally began showing some offense and was able to punt the ball to the Michigan 5. They ended up with excellent field position for their next possession, which was capped by a 1-yard touchdown run by Champ Benson, and gave the scarlet-and-gray a 7–3 lead. The Wolverines then got to the OSU 1, but with the record Ohio Stadium crowd screaming themselves hoarse, the Buckeyes stopped Michigan at the goal line. Schembechler elected to go for it on fourth-down, but the offense was once again denied the score, and the Buckeyes went to the dressing room with a 7–3 lead.

Ohio State started the second half with a productive drive, which included a 35-yard option run from Greg Hare, followed by a 30-yard touchdown run from Archie Griffin that had the crowd going berserk and extended the Buckeyes’ lead to 14–3. Needing a productive drive of its own, Michigan once again got the ball to the Ohio State 1, and Shuttlesworth scored on fourth-down. Schembechler went for the two-point conversion and got it to trim Ohio State's lead to 14–11. Michigan failed to score on their next possession, but would get the ball back when Randy Logan picked off a Hare pass on OSU's 29-yard line. U-M once again got the ball to the Buckeye 1, but miraculously, the Ohio State defense kept them out again, holding them on third and fourth down for their second goal-line stand of the game, as the crowd noise approached the pain threshold.

Despite the heroic stop, the Buckeyes couldn't get a first down on their next possession, but that point would become moot when Michigan tried to go for it on a fourth-and–10 rather than punt. The Buckeyes got the ball into Wolverine territory, but missed a 46-yard field goal try. Michigan had one last chance to win the Rose Bowl berth with at least a tie, driving to the Ohio State 41. Crazed Buckeye fans were already tearing the goal posts down and had to be removed so play could continue. Franklin was then sacked, which sent the fans back on the field. They had to be removed yet again so Hare could take a knee, then the celebration began for real.

Ohio State returned to Pasadena, but lost to eventual national champion USC 42–17 and finish the season ranked #9. Michigan finished at #6.

=== 1973: Ohio State 10, Michigan 10 ===
The Vote for the Roses
Ohio State Buckeyes	Michigan Wolverines
(9–0)	(10–0)
10	10
Head coach: Woody Hayes	Head coach: Bo Schembechler
AP / Coaches; 1 / 1	AP / Coaches; 4 / 4
	1	2	3	4	Total
Ohio State	0	10	0	0	10
Michigan	0	0	3	7	10
- Date: November 24, 1973
- Season: 1973
- Stadium: Michigan Stadium
- Location: Ann Arbor, Michigan

Ohio State came into Ann Arbor for the 1973 edition of "The Game" as the #1 team in the country, with a team that rivaled the strength of the 1969 squad. No team had come within 24 points of the Buckeyes all season, led by sophomore quarterback Cornelius Greene. Archie Griffin would be back as well, along with back Brian Baschnagel and tight end Fred Pagac. The Buckeyes led the nation in scoring defense, allowing less than four points per game. Michigan was also undefeated, but ranked #4, and they were equally dominant offensively, with each victory by at least a two-touchdown cushion. Dennis Franklin continued as quarterback, with Ed Shuttlesworth, Chuck Heater, Gordon Bell and Gil Chapman churning out the yards. The only question mark for the Wolverines came from an offensive line riddled with injuries, but Michigan was 2nd only to the Buckeyes in scoring defense.

The record crowd of 105,223 at Michigan Stadium booed loudly as the Buckeyes tried to tear down the traditional M Club banner that the Wolverines run under when coming out of the tunnel, but the fired-up teams couldn't do much offensively on the field – neither of them moved the ball much during the first quarter. Archie Griffin, beginning a superb game performance, helped awaken the OSU defense in the second quarter by running 38 yards on a third-and-two from his own 28, but the drive stopped in Michigan territory and Ohio State went up 3–0 on a Blair Conway field goal. Ohio State would go into the locker room with a 10–0 lead thanks to a five-yard scoring run by Pete Johnson.

Michigan began moving the ball in the air to start the second half, only to have a Franklin pass picked off by Neal Colzie in the end zone. Two possessions later, Ohio State began a drive marked by a running option from Cornelius Greene, but a defensive stop on fourth-and-two ended the drive. Michigan would finally get on the board with a 30-yard field goal from Mike Lantry to trim OSU's lead to 10–3. On their next possession, Michigan tied the game up when Franklin faked a handoff to Ed Shuttlesworth and ran an option 9 yards into the end zone. Hayes, hoping to have his defense take the game, called plays conservatively, but without much success. Dennis Franklin would leave the game with a broken collarbone and was replaced with Larry Cipa. Michigan's Mike Lantry would miss two field goals, the second a 44-yarder with 24 seconds left, and the game would end in a 10–10 tie, the first in the rivalry since 1949.

Michigan went into the locker room convinced they had won the Rose Bowl berth, a notion that even Hayes conceded. With the Big Ten's "no-repeat" rule gone, the decision on the conference representative would be decided by a telephone vote of the athletic directors. But the following afternoon, Big Ten commissioner Wayne Duke announced that by a 6–4 vote, Ohio State would go to the Rose Bowl. The vote enraged Schembechler, who blamed "petty jealousies" on the vote, demanded more changes to what he thought were the Big Ten's archaic postseason policies, and accused Duke of influencing the vote because of Franklin's injury. If the vote was tied at five apiece, Michigan would have gotten the berth since OSU went the year before. Schembechler was particularly upset because his 1973 team did not lose a game and was not awarded with a bowl assignment. As for Ohio State, they trounced USC in the Rose Bowl 42–21 and finished ranked #2 in the AP poll and #3 in the UPI coaches poll.

=== 1974: Ohio State 12, Michigan 10 ===
Klaban's Golden Foot
Michigan Wolverines	Ohio State Buckeyes
(10–0)	(9–1)
10	12
Head coach: Bo Schembechler	Head coach: Woody Hayes
AP / Coaches; 2 / 2	AP / Coaches; 3 / 3
	1	2	3	4	Total
Michigan	10	0	0	0	10
Ohio State	0	9	3	0	12
- Date: November 23, 1974
- Season: 1974
- Stadium: Ohio Stadium
- Location: Columbus, Ohio

Hayes suffered a heart attack following Ohio State's successful '73 season, but recovered and managed to retain one of the top teams in college football. Archie Griffin was back, in the midst of his first Heisman Trophy-winning season during which he’d break his own conference rushing record. Cornelius Greene returned at quarterback, with Champ Henson and Pete Johnson as alternating fullbacks. The defense was a question mark thanks to injuries, but walk-on Tom Klaban, a Czechoslovak refugee, emerged as their kicker. Michigan's defense, on the other hand, was one of the best in the country, leading in rush defense and third overall. Dennis Franklin was dominant at quarterback, with Chuck Heater the top rusher, and Gordon Bell and Rob Lytle alternating at tailback. The Wolverines went into the Ohio State game undefeated and ranked #3. Ohio State was #4 with one loss, a controversial defeat to MSU at East Lansing two weeks earlier.

Ohio State could not do much on its first possession of the game, on a sunny and mild November 23 at Ohio Stadium. Michigan would make the Buckeyes pay once they got the ball, as Franklin hit Gil Chapman for a 42-yard touchdown and a 7–0 lead for the Wolverines. OSU did a better job moving the ball on their next carry, getting the ball to the UM 26 only to fumble it away. Michigan extended its lead to 10–0 on a 37-yard Lantry field goal with just 4:57 left in the first quarter. Griffin was able to help move the ball to the Michigan 30, and as the second quarter started, Klaban kicked a 47-yard field goal to put Ohio State on the board 10–3. Klaban would narrow the score even more on the Buckeyes’ next possession, this time a 24-yarder to cut the Michigan lead to 10–6. After another stalled Wolverine drive, Klaban struck a third time, on a 43-yard kick with six seconds left in the half, and Michigan held a paltry 10–9 lead at halftime.

Michigan was unable to move the ball on its first possession of the half and the Buckeyes got terrific field position at the Michigan 48. After just one first down, the drive stopped and Klaban was called on again, sending the crowd at the "Horseshoe" into ecstasy with a 45-foot boot. Ohio State was ahead 12–10. Both teams exchanged punts throughout the third quarter, and as the final stanza got underway, the two teams began playing for field position. Michigan moved the ball into Buckeye territory, but a 59-yard field goal attempt by Lantry failed. The two rivals would trade possessions before Michigan got the ball back with 57 seconds left. The Wolverines called their last timeout with 16 seconds left and the ball on the Buckeye 16, when Lantry was brought in to kick for the win and the Rose Bowl berth. The kick barely missed the left upright, and the fans at Ohio Stadium exploded, rushing the field to tear the goal posts down as Lantry stood dejected. Just like in 1972, the field had to be cleared of celebrating OSU fans before the final play.

With the two squads tied for the conference title again, the athletic directors voted once more. But this time there was no controversy. Michigan stayed home for the holidays again while Ohio State stamped its ticket to Pasadena for the 3rd year in a row, where they would lose on a late USC touchdown 18–17.

=== 1975: Ohio State 21, Michigan 14 ===
A Scarlet and Gray Shift
Ohio State Buckeyes	Michigan Wolverines
(10–0)	(8–0–2)
21	14
Head coach: Woody Hayes	Head coach: Bo Schembechler
AP / Coaches; 1 / 1	AP / Coaches; 4 / 5
	1	2	3	4	Total
Ohio State	7	0	0	14	21
Michigan	0	7	0	7	14
- Date: November 22, 1975
- Season: 1975
- Stadium: Michigan Stadium
- Location: Ann Arbor, Michigan

Michigan had what could be considered the closest thing to a rebuilding year during the Ten-Year-War. Dennis Franklin was gone, and in his place was true freshman Rick Leach. As a consequence, U-M concentrated on the running game. Rob Lytle shifted to fullback so he could continue churning out yardage with Gordon Bell. The Wolverines’ offensive line was young and injury-prone, but their defense was 2nd in the country only to Ohio State's. #4 Michigan was undefeated, but with ties against Stanford and Baylor. The Buckeyes were ranked #1 and unbeaten again, with the Archie Griffin and Cornelius Greene-led offensive corps better than ever. Griffin entered the Michigan game with a 31-game streak of at least 100 yards rushed, an NCAA record that still stands.

Paranoia seemed to be the story behind preparation for the 1975 edition of "The Game". Schembechler had Ann Arbor police confiscate the film of a UPI photographer who was caught taking pictures of the closed practice, believing Hayes had sent him as a spy. Meanwhile, during a team dinner in Columbus, Hayes suddenly ordered the attractive female servers to leave, asking that the cooks serve the food. Hayes had believed Schembechler had planted the women to distract his players.

Another record Michigan Stadium crowd, of 105,543, turned out on November 22. Michigan punted away their first possession, and Ohio State cashed in right after, driving the ball and scoring on a 7-yard touchdown catch by Pete Johnson. Defense then took over and was the story well into the second quarter, with turnovers on both sides – Greene threw two interceptions and Michigan would fumble twice. Toward the end of the quarter, Leach tossed to Bell, who then threw to Jim Smith in the corner of the Buckeye end zone for an 11-yard touchdown, tying the game at 7–7. The maize-and-blue got the ball right back after Griffin was hit, fumbling the ball away at his own 21-yard line. A Bob Wood field goal try missed, and the game stayed tied at the half.

Ohio State couldn't move the ball on its first carry of the second half, and Michigan's ensuing possession ended in a failed 53-yard field goal attempt by Greg Willner. Both teams traded punts for the balance of the third quarter. The Wolverines finally got the best of the exhausted OSU defense in the fourth quarter, as Leach led Michigan back down the field on a drive capped by his own score on a 3-yard option run. The Bob Wood extra point put Michigan up 14–7. Ohio State desperately needed a first down, and after almost coughing up the ball again, finally got their first one since the second quarter. That seemed to motivate the scarlet-and-gray offense, and they finally began moving the ball toward the Michigan goal line. With 3:30 left in the game, Greene handed off to Johnson on a fourth-and-goal, and the game was tied up 14–14.

Michigan now needed a score since a tie would send Ohio State back to Pasadena. Leach threw on a third-and-long from U-M's own red zone, but it was picked off by Ray Griffin, who returned it to the Michigan 3. Johnson would score on the next play and put the Buckeyes ahead 21–14. Now harried, Michigan tried moving the ball, but was unable to do so, and a Leach pass on fourth down was intercepted by Craig Cassady. OSU ran down the clock and celebrated their fourth straight trip to the Rose Bowl, having broken Michigan's 41-game home winning streak. Another streak was broken as well, as Archie Griffin was held to just 46 yards, ending his 100-yard game streak at 31 on his way to a second straight Heisman Trophy.

Ohio State did go back to Pasadena, but this time the situation was different for Michigan. A rule change by the conference in effect eliminated the rule only the champion (or if the same team repeated, the second-place team) could accept a postseason bid, the Rose Bowl. The Orange Bowl had offered an invitation to the loser of "The Game". Michigan then became the first Big Ten team to play in a bowl game other than the Rose, losing in Miami to eventual national champion Oklahoma 14–6. The reason Oklahoma finished on top was because the #1 Buckeyes were upset out west, by UCLA, 23–10, the same Bruins squad Ohio State humbled 41–20 during the regular season at the Los Angeles Memorial Coliseum.

=== 1976: Michigan 22, Ohio State 0 ===
Bo's Bicentennial Blitz
Michigan Wolverines	Ohio State Buckeyes
(9–1)	(8–1–1)
22	0
Head coach: Bo Schembechler	Head coach: Woody Hayes
AP / Coaches; 4 / 4	AP / Coaches; 8 / 8
	1	2	3	4	Total
Michigan	0	0	15	7	22
Ohio State	0	0	0	0	0
- Date: November 20, 1976
- Season: 1976
- Stadium: Ohio Stadium
- Location: Columbus, Ohio

Schembechler's heart interfered once more during America's Bicentennial year of 1976. He had open heart surgery during the offseason, but was back by the start of fall practice. Michigan had developed into an offensive juggernaut, thanks to Rick Leach at quarterback, and a strong backfield that included Rob Lytle, Russell Davis and Harlan Huckleby. It ranked first in the Big Ten in total offense, and first nationally in points scored and rushing yardage. The Wolverines were ranked #1 until they were upset by Purdue a couple of weeks before "The Game", and was ranked #4.

Ohio State made some minor adjustments in its personnel, as Rod Gerald replaced Cornelius Greene as the signal-caller. Pete Johnson scored 18 touchdowns for the Buckeyes in ‘76, while Jeff Logan rushed for over 1,100 yards. The Buckeyes lost to Missouri and tied UCLA and were ranked #8. This marked the first time since 1967 that both teams faced each other with at least one loss.

On a bright November 20 in Columbus, Jim Pacenta would start at quarterback for the scarlet-and-gray, filling in for the injured Gerald. The first quarter passed without much offense, as both teams tried to size each other up. Michigan's first significant drive of the game carried over into the second quarter, but Lytle would be stuffed by two Ohio State defenders. Ohio State's offense wouldn't get going until there were four minutes left in the half, pushing the pigskin to the Wolverine 10. Pacenta then threw into the endzone, but instead of hitting tight end Greg Storer, it was intercepted by Jim Pickens, resulting in a touchback. The game was a scoreless tie at the half.

Michigan made some adjustments and came out for the third quarter swinging, as Leach led a drive that included a 20-yard keeper on a third-and-two. A few plays later, Ohio State jumped offside in its own red zone, giving the Wolverines a free first down, and Russell Davis took advantage by rushing in to break the scoreless tie. Bob Wood's point-after had Michigan leading 7–0. The Buckeyes went three-and-out on their next possession, and the Wolverines continued churning out yardage. Davis would take the ball in again for another 3-yard touchdown run. A fake point-after try became a two-point conversion and Michigan was up 15–0.

Now urgently needing a score, the Buckeyes finally put together a significant possession that carried over into the fourth quarter, but that drive would end when Jeff Logan fumbled and the ball was recovered by Tom Seabron. Michigan tried to go for a third-straight carry for a score, but they turned the ball over deep in OSU territory on a Tom Roche interception. The exhausted Buckeye defense had no time to recharge, though, as Pacenta threw another errant pass that was picked off by Jerry Zuver. Three plays later, Lytle, playing the game of his career, ran it in four yards to extend UM's lead to 22–0.

Schembechler would send bench players in as the game ran down, and Michigan players rejoiced at silent Ohio Stadium with their first win over Ohio State since 1971 and their first in Columbus since 1966. It was also the first shutout in the rivalry since Michigan's 10–0 triumph in 1964.

Michigan lost the Rose Bowl to USC 14–6 in a tough, defensive battle, but managed to finish the season ranked #3. Ohio State would come from behind in Miami to beat Colorado 27–10 in the Orange Bowl, and finish #6. Pittsburgh Panthers, the team that took over Michigan's #1 ranking, won the national championship by beating the Georgia Bulldogs 27–3 in the Sugar Bowl.

=== 1977: Michigan 14, Ohio State 6 ===
Maize and Blue Momentum
Ohio State Buckeyes	Michigan Wolverines
(9–1)	(9–1)
6	14
Head coach: Woody Hayes	Head coach: Bo Schembechler
AP / Coaches; 4 / 4	AP / Coaches; 5 / 5
	1	2	3	4	Total
Ohio State	3	0	3	0	6
Michigan	0	7	7	0	14
- Date: November 19, 1977
- Season: 1977
- Stadium: Michigan Stadium
- Location: Ann Arbor, Michigan

Despite losing Rob Lytle to graduation, Michigan still had a talented offense in 1977. Roosevelt Smith fit in nicely with the backfield of Davis and Huckleby. U-M's defense was also strong, ranked second in rushing defense and fourth in scoring defense. The Wolverines spent much of the '77 campaign as the #1 team in the country, but they were embarrassed by Minnesota in the Little Brown Jug game in a 16–0 shutout. They would recover and be ranked #5 before the Ohio State game. OSU's dangerous offense was spearheaded by quarterback Rod Gerald, who had a breakout year, and tailback Ron Springs rushing for over a thousand yards. Jeff Logan played at both tailback and fullback. The Buckeye defense recorded four shutouts, with four other opponents held to less than a TD to lead the nation in scoring defense. Ohio State's only blemish was a close loss to Oklahoma, and they went into Ann Arbor ranked 4th.

A fired-up OSU squad tried once again to rip down the M Club banner in front of a record crowd of 106,024, leading to a short shoving match between the Buckeyes and the Michigan students. Once the game started, Ohio State went right to work, driving the ball into the Wolverine red zone only to have the drive stop at the 11-yard line. A 29-yard field goal from Vlade Janakievski put the Buckeyes on the board first 3–0. Ohio State drove the ball again into Michigan territory, but a botched option play held the Buckeyes in check, and a Janakievski field goal try failed. Michigan would finally get yardage of its own in the second quarter, only to miss a field-goal try. Both teams traded possessions for much of the quarter, until Michigan finally had a drive that ended in the end zone, as Roosevelt Smith pounded the ball in for a 7–3 Wolverine lead. The Buckeyes went into field-goal territory again only to have a 49-yard attempt by Janakievski fall short with 10 seconds left in the half.

Michigan went three-and-out to start the second half, but got the ball right back when Ron Simpkins picked up an Ohio State fumble at the Buckeye 20. Blessed with excellent field position, the Wolverines marched off four plays and after taking an early timeout, Rick Leach would score on a 1-yard quarterback keeper, prompting a toilet-paper shower onto the Michigan Stadium field and extending the Wolverine lead to 14–3. Ohio State's dangerous option offense got into Michigan territory again, but the scarlet-and-gray would be held to a field goal by Janakievski, who connected from 44 yards out to cut Michigan's lead to 14–6. Ohio State would then get a golden opportunity of its own, recovering a Roosevelt Smith fumble to get the ball back at the Wolverine 31, but the Buckeyes would lose yardage and miss another field-goal try.

Michigan's next two possessions resulted in no additional points, and each time after that, Ohio State would get the ball inside Michigan's 10-yard-line, only to turn it over. The second time hurt more, as Gerald lost control of a pass and fumbled it away, recovered by Derek Howard. Hayes was then seen on camera throwing his phone on the ground, then taking a swing at the ABC-TV cameraman who recorded it, Mike Freeman. The Buckeyes would get the ball back for one last chance, but on a fourth-and-three with 1:10 left, the Michigan defense held. The maize-and-blue would run out the clock, and fans poured onto the field to celebrate Michigan's second straight Rose Bowl berth.

Michigan would lose in Pasadena 27–20 to Washington and finish ranked #9. Ohio State would be clobbered by Alabama 35–6 in the Sugar Bowl in New Orleans.

=== 1978: Michigan 14, Ohio State 3 ===
The Rick Leach Show
Michigan Wolverines	Ohio State Buckeyes
(9–1)	(7–2–1)
14	3
Head coach: Bo Schembechler	Head coach: Woody Hayes
AP / Coaches; 6 / 6	AP / Coaches; 16 / 16
	1	2	3	4	Total
Michigan	7	0	7	0	14
Ohio State	3	0	0	0	3
- Date: November 25, 1978
- Season: 1978
- Stadium: Ohio Stadium
- Location: Columbus, Ohio

1978 would signal Ohio State's turn to put a freshman quarterback in the depth chart. After a lively recruiting duel with Schembechler, Hayes persuaded Art Schlichter to sign a letter of intent to play in Columbus, then moved veteran Rod Gerald to end. Though bogged down with injuries, Ron Springs returned at tailback, with Calvin Murray and Ricky Johnson providing support, along with All-American linebacker Tom Cousineau. The Buckeyes began the season slow, losing to Penn State and Purdue, and tying Southern Methodist, but won the rest of their contests going into the Michigan game.

The Wolverines kept chugging along, with Rick Leach setting an NCAA record for touchdowns. Roosevelt Smith and Butch Woolfolk were among those rotating at tailback, and Russell Davis excelled again at fullback. The defense was first in the conference, having recorded four shutouts. The only mark on the Wolverines’ record was a loss in Ann Arbor to Michigan State. The winner of "The Game" would tie MSU for the conference title, but go to the Rose Bowl, since the Spartans were barred from postseason play as punishment for recruiting violations. The loser would head to the Gator Bowl in Jacksonville, Florida.

In front of a crowd of 88,358 at Ohio Stadium, the scarlet-and-gray took early control, stopping Michigan's running attack on their first two possessions. After kicker Bob Atha missed a 38-yard field goal try on the Buckeyes’ first attempt at offense, Atha would capitalize on the second attempt, kicking a 29-yarder to give OSU a 3–0 lead. Michigan shifted to the air when they got the ball, as Leach hit Woolfolk and Doug Marsh repeatedly to move into Buckeye territory. Then at the Ohio State 30, Leach connected with Rodney Feaster, who ran into the end zone and put the Wolverines ahead 7–3. The second quarter showed both teams trading punts until halfway through the quarter, when Ohio State used the option to get the ball to the Michigan 24, but Schlichter got hit by UM linebacker Jerry Meter, popping the ball loose with Andy Cannavino recovering. Michigan tried to put together another score before halftime, but Gene Johnson was stripped of the ball going into the end zone, and it was recovered by OSU defensive back Vince Skillings for a touchback. While in the locker room during halftime, Leach informed Schembechler that a hamstring injury he had just suffered would affect his movement, but he refused to leave the game.

The third quarter began with Michigan controlling the tempo. Despite the hamstring injury, Leach continued to lead the offense effectively and the Wolverines got the ball to the OSU 11. Leach then dropped a pass to Smith, who scored and extended the UM lead to 14–3 after Greg Wilmer's extra point. An ABC camera caught Hayes on the sideline after the touchdown, punching himself in the face several times. Ohio State's offense struggled into the fourth quarter, although they were able to force a Wolverine punt at one point and down it at the 1. Hayes then pulled Schlichter and stuck Gerald back in at quarterback, who was unable to get the Buckeye running game moving against the Michigan defense. With the Wolverines getting the ball back, Smith carried three times before having to leave the game with a twisted knee. On their next possession, Ohio State tried for a fake punt on fourth-and-five and failed.

Leach would then leave the game himself and be replaced with B.J. Dickey. After U-M failed to score, Schlichter would return to the game for the Buckeyes, but their next possession would end on an interception by Michigan's Mike Jolly, and the one after that ended on downs. Dickey then ran out the clock, beginning the celebration of three straight wins over Ohio State, two of the last three at the Horseshoe.

The game also marked the third straight year that Ohio State was unable to score a touchdown against the Wolverines, which bothered Hayes to the point where he chewed out a reporter who asked him about it after the game.

Michigan returned to the Rose Bowl for the third year in a row, but lost to eventual national champion USC 17–10. Michigan would finish the season ranked #5.

Ohio State, who finished the regular season 7–3–1, went to Jacksonville to play Clemson in the Gator Bowl. Hayes was fired as head coach for hitting Clemson middle guard Charlie Baumann in the neck after he intercepted Schlichter late in the game, ending his successful 28-season career at Ohio State.

Schembechler, who held a slight edge during the Ten-Year War with a 5–4–1 record, would continue coaching the Wolverines for 11 more seasons, winning five more Big Ten championships until retiring after the 1989 season.
