= 1978 Sugar Bowl =

American college football game

- 44th Sugar Bowl
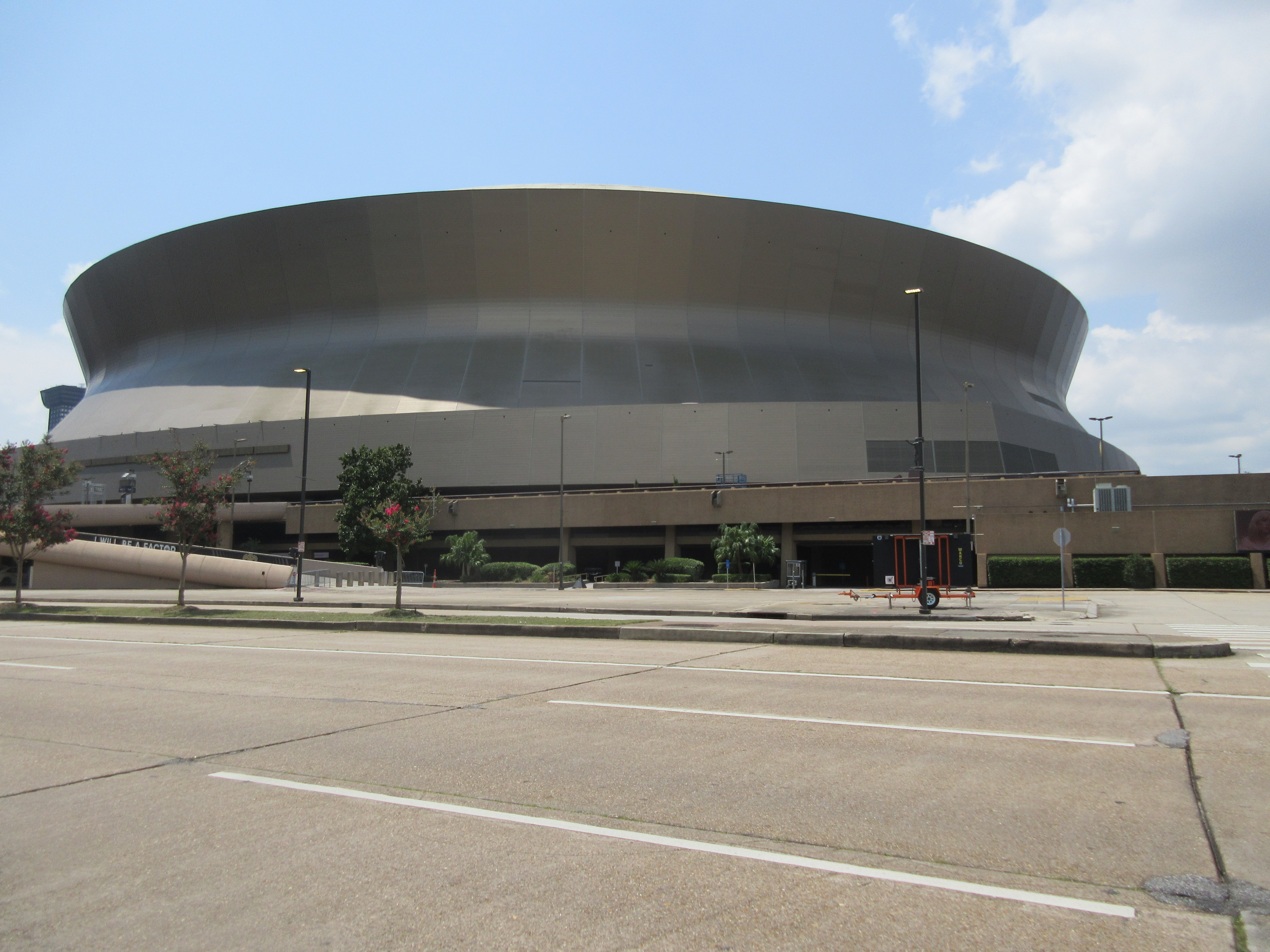
- The Louisiana Superdome in New Orleans, Louisiana, hosted the Sugar Bowl.
Ohio State Buckeyes	Alabama Crimson Tide
(9–2)	(10–1)
Big Ten	SEC
6	35
Head coach: Woody Hayes	Head coach: Bear Bryant
AP / Coaches; 9 / 8	AP / Coaches; 3 / 3
	1	2	3	4	Total
Ohio State	0	0	0	6	6
Alabama	0	13	8	14	35
- Date: January 2, 1978
- Season: 1977
- Stadium: Louisiana Superdome
- Location: New Orleans, Louisiana
- MVP: Jeff Rutledge (Alabama QB)
- Favorite: Alabama by 1 point
- Referee: Percy Penn (SWC)
- Attendance: 76,811

United States TV coverage
- Network: ABC
- Announcers: Keith Jackson and Ara Parseghian

The 1978 Sugar Bowl was the 44th edition of the college football bowl game, played at the Louisiana Superdome in New Orleans, Louisiana, on Monday, January 2. Part of the 1977–78 bowl game season, it matched the third-ranked Alabama Crimson Tide of the Southeastern Conference (SEC) and the #9 Ohio State Buckeyes of the Big Ten Conference.

The teams were led by their respective hall of fame head coaches, Bear Bryant and Woody Hayes, who were the winningest active coaches. Slightly favored, Alabama won in a rout, 35–6.

New Year's Day was on Sunday in 1978, and the major college bowl games were played the following day.

== Teams ==
=== Alabama ===
Alabama finished the regular season as SEC champions with a record of 10–1; the only loss was at Nebraska (31–24) in week two. On November 19, bowl officials announced that Alabama would face Ohio State in the Sugar Bowl. The appearance marked the eighth for Alabama in the Sugar Bowl, and their 31st overall bowl appearance. It was the Tide's second game against a Big Ten opponent, the first was at Wisconsin in the 1928 regular season.

=== Ohio State ===
Ohio State finished the regular season as co-champions of the Big Ten with a record of 9–2. Their only defeats were to Oklahoma by a point (29–28) on a disputed late field goal in week three and at rival Michigan Wolverines (14–6) to close the regular season. On November 19, bowl officials announced that Michigan would play in the Rose Bowl and that Ohio State would face Alabama in the Sugar Bowl.

The appearance marked the first for Ohio State in the Sugar Bowl, and their 12th overall bowl appearance. This was the first edition of the Sugar Bowl to feature a Big Ten team. It was the Buckeyes' first game against an SEC team since 1935, when they defeated Kentucky in the season opener.

== Game summary ==
The game kicked off at around 1 pm CST, as did the Cotton Bowl.

After a scoreless first quarter, Alabama scored on a one-yard Tony Nathan touchdown run to cap a 10-play, 76-yard drive. On their next offensive possession, Bama scored again on a 27-yard Jeff Rutledge touchdown pass to Bruce Bolton to take a 13–0 lead at the half.

In the third quarter, Rutledge had his second touchdown on a 3-yard pass to Rick Neal. Following a successful two-point conversion pass to Nathan, Alabama led 21–0, the score at the quarter's end. The Buckeyes scored their only points of the game early in the fourth when Rod Gerald threw a 38-yard touchdown pass to Jim Harrell, but failed on the two-point try and the score was 21–6. Bama closed the game with a pair of touchdown runs, the first from one yard by Major Ogilvie, and the second by Johnny Davis on a seven-yard run to make the final score 35–6.

Scoring summary

Quarter	Time	Drive			Team	Scoring information	Score	
Quarter	Time	Plays	Yards	TOP	Team	Scoring information	Ohio State	Alabama
2	11:31	10	76		Alabama	Tony Nathan 1-yard touchdown run, Roger Chapman kick good	0	7
2	4:08	11	76		Alabama	Bruce Bolton 27-yard touchdown reception from Jeff Rutledge, Chapman kick no good	0	13
3	1:13	13	67		Alabama	Rick Neal 3-yard touchdown reception from Rutledge, 2-point pass good	0	21
4	13:34				Ohio State	Jim Harrell 38-yard touchdown reception from Rod Gerald, 2-point pass failed	6	21
4	6:30	14	84		Alabama	Major Ogilvie 1-yard touchdown run, Chapman kick good	6	28
4	5:09	4	24		Alabama	Johnny Davis 7-yard touchdown run, Chapman kick good	6	35
"TOP" = time of possession. For other American football terms, see Glossary of American football.							6	35

== Statistics ==
Statistics	Alabama	Ohio State
First downs	25	13
Rushing yards	68–280	38–160
Passing yards	109	103
Passing	8–11–0	7–17–3
Total offense	79–389	55–263
Punts–average	1–33.0	4–37.5
Fumbles–lost	0–0	10–2
Turnovers	0	5
Penalties–yards	1–5	4–40

== Aftermath ==
While #3 Alabama won easily, top-ranked Texas and #2 Oklahoma were both upset by large margins in their bowl games. Fifth-ranked Notre Dame's 38–10 rout of #1 Texas in the Cotton Bowl gained them the top spot in both final polls; Alabama was the runner-up and Orange Bowl winner Arkansas was third.

Notre Dame finished ahead of Alabama despite losing 20-13 to Ole Miss, which lost 34-13 to Alabama the week before. The Tide fell to Nebraska the same day the Rebels ousted the Fighting Irish.

Alabama returned to the Sugar Bowl the following year and won the national championship.

This was the final major bowl game for Woody Hayes; Ohio State played in the Gator Bowl in December 1978, his last game as head coach.
