= Rod Gerald =

American football player and coach (born 1956)

No. 8
- Position: Quarterback/Wide receiver

Personal information
- Born: 1956 (age 69–70); Dallas, Texas, U.S.
- Listed height: 6 ft 1 in (1.85 m)
- Listed weight: 176 lb (80 kg)

Career information
- High school: South Oak Cliff
- College: Ohio State (1975–1978)

Career history
- Walnut Ridge High School (1990–1991); Mifflin High School (1992–1994)

Awards and highlights
- First-team All-Big Ten (1977); Orange Bowl champion (1976); Orange Bowl 1977 MVP

Rod Gerald is a former quarterback for the Ohio State Buckeyes from 1975 to 1977 and became a wide receiver in 1978.

== Early life ==
Gerald attended South Oak Cliff High School in Dallas, Texas, where he was named as an all-Texas quarterback. He was recruited heavily by several schools in the Southern Conferences and strongly considered signing with Tennessee. Following a trip to Columbus, Ohio, for the annual Michigan-Ohio State Rivalry, he was recruited by Woody Hayes to sign with the Ohio State Buckeyes.

== College career ==
As a freshman, Gerald was behind Cornelius Greene in the depth chart. While he did see some on-field action, his production was limited to 16 rushing attempts and two passing attempts. He did manage to rush for three touchdowns in his debut season. In his sophomore season, Gerald became the starting quarterback for the Buckeyes. He started the season off 4-1-1 and ranked in the top ten in the nation. During the first quarter in the game against Purdue, Gerald was carted off the field after he injured his back. The diagnosis was that he had fractured three transverse processes in his spine, which sidelined him for the next four games. He returned as the starter for the 1977 Orange Bowl, where the No. 11 Buckeyes defeated No. 12 Colorado 27–10. Gerald was named 1977 Orange Bowl MVP.

In Gerald's junior season, he once again took over the starting role. He finished the season 9–3 with losses coming to No. 3 Oklahoma, No. 5 Michigan and in the 1978 Sugar Bowl to No. 3 Alabama. The Buckeyes were co-Big Ten Champions with a conference record of 7–1. He was named to the all-Big Ten team for his accomplishments.

The 1978 season saw Freshman phenom Art Schlichter join the team. It was with the addition of Schlichter that Gerald lost his starting spot. In order to maintain a starting spot, Gerald transitioned to wide receiver for his final year. That year ended with Ohio State finishing 7–4–1 and losing to No. 7 Clemson in the 1978 Gator Bowl. It was in this game where Woody Hayes punched an opposing player and was ultimately Hayes' last game as Ohio State's coach.

Ohio State Buckeyes
Season	Passing						Rushing				Receiving			
Season	Comp	Att	Yards	Pct	TD	Int	Att	Yards	Avg	TD	Rec	Yards	Avg	TD
1975	0	2	0	0.0	0	0	16	139	8.7	3	0	0	0.0	0
1976	14	40	245	35.0	0	4	116	465	4.0	7	0	0	0.0	0
1977	67	114	1,016	58.8	4	11	124	446	3.6	7	0	0	0.0	0
1978	2	2	12	100.0	0	0	9	7	0.8	1	16	314	19.6	1
Totals	83	158	1,273	52.5	4	15	265	1,057	4.0	18	16	314	19.6	1

== Life after football ==
Gerald had struggled with drug use during his time at Ohio State. He left the university and went back to Texas following his college career and didn't graduate with a degree.

In the late 1980s he decided to return to Central Ohio where he would eventually return to Ohio State and graduate with a degree in 1989. Following his graduation, he became a housing inspector for the City of Columbus.

In 1994, Gerald relapsed on drugs following the death of his brother. When his father died in 1998, he fell even further into his addiction. Gerald moved back to Dallas where he became homeless and eventually spent 11 months in jail for burglary. After he was released from jail, Gerald began to turn his life around and reconciled with his children and started to speak publicly about his journey.

Gerald now lives in Dallas, Texas where he has since undergone four extensive back and neck surgeries. He is still in much pain, but has been drug-free for years now. He spends most of his time taking care of his grandchildren whom he adores and talks to new and old friends on social media. https://www.cincinnati.com/story/sports/2015/09/16/ex-osu-star-braces-emotional-homecoming/32513793/
