= Tom Cousineau =

American gridiron football player (born 1957)

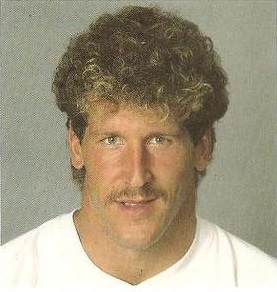
- Cousineau in 1985

No. 45, 50, 57, 59
- Position: Linebacker

Personal information
- Born: May 6, 1957 (age 69); Fairview Park, Ohio, U.S.
- Listed height: 6 ft 3 in (1.91 m)
- Listed weight: 225 lb (102 kg)

Career information
- High school: St. Edward (Lakewood, Ohio)
- College: Ohio State
- NFL draft: 1979: 1st round, 1st overall pick

Career history
- Montreal Alouettes (1979–1981); Cleveland Browns (1982–1985); San Francisco 49ers (1986–1987)

Awards and highlights
- Second-team All-Pro (1984); PFWA All-Rookie Team (1982); Grey Cup Most Valuable Player (1979); James P. McCaffrey Trophy (1980); CFL All-Star (1980); 2× Consensus All-American (1977-1978); 3× First-team All-Big Ten (1976-1978)

Career NFL statistics
- Sacks: 6.5
- Interceptions: 10
- Fumble recoveries: 5
- Stats at Pro Football Reference
- College Football Hall of Fame

Thomas Michael Cousineau (/ˈkuːzɪnoʊ/ KOO-zih-noh; born May 6, 1957) is an American former professional football player who was a linebacker in the Canadian Football League (CFL) and National Football League (NFL) for nine seasons during the 1970s and 1980s. He played college football for Ohio State University, and twice earned All-American honors. He was the first overall pick of the 1979 NFL draft, and played professionally for the CFL's Montreal Alouettes and the NFL's Cleveland Browns and San Francisco 49ers.

Cousineau is a member of the College Football Hall of Fame, elected in the class of 2016. He is also a member of the Ohio State Varsity "O" Hall of Fame, inducted in 1995, and St. Edward High School Hall of Fame. Cousineau was the recipient of the Silver Anniversary Butkus Award in 2003.

== Early life ==
Cousineau was born in Fairview Park, Ohio, to Carol and Tom Cousineau Sr, who was the head football coach and a wrestling coach at Lakewood (Ohio) High School. His mother wanted him not to play football under the shadow of his father. Thus, Cousineau played high school football for nearby St. Edward High School. He excelled and was one of the most highly recruited football players in the country in his senior year. He graduated in 1975.

Cousineau was also an accomplished wrestler. In 1975, under legendary coach Howard Ferguson, he lost to future NFL player Bob Golic from cross-town all-boys school rival St. Joseph High School in the Ohio state wrestling tournament semifinals in the heavyweight weight class, in a match that was called "one of the most memorable." Golic would go on to win the state title and Cousineau would finish in third place. Golic would go to be a two-time All-American at heavyweight at Notre Dame, and he and Cousineau would eventually become teammates in the NFL with the Browns.

== College football career ==
Cousineau attended Ohio State University, where he played for legendary coach Woody Hayes' Ohio State Buckeyes football team from 1975 to 1978. During that span, Ohio State had an overall record of 36-10-2 and 28–4 in the Big Ten, were three-time Big Ten champs. The Buckeyes played four bowl games after each of the seasons he played: in the Rose Bowl, Orange Bowl, Sugar Bowl and Gator Bowl. They were a Top 5 team for 36 weeks over these four years and the No. 1 team in the nation for eight weeks in 1975, and ultimately finished fourth, sixth and 12th in the final Associated Press polls in 1975, 1976 and 1977, respectively.

Cousineau majored in marketing. He was a consensus first-team All-American, breaking the school record with 211 tackles in a single season in 1978, an average of 17.5 a game. He also broke the school record for most tackles in a game with 29 against Penn State in 1978, and was the MVP of the 1977 Orange Bowl.

Cousineau's last game for the Buckeyes was the infamous 1978 Gator Bowl against Clemson, during which Coach Hayes punched Clemson linebacker Charlie Bauman in the final minutes of the game. Hayes was fired the following day for the incident.

Cousineau still holds many of Ohio State's tackling records. As of 2016, he holds six of the top 10 single-game tackling records, 29 single-game tackles (since tied by fellow College Football Hall of Famer Chris Spielman), most solo tackles in a single game, (16 against SMU in 1978). He also ranks second on both the all-time OSU tackle list with 569 (three behind Marcus Marek) and on the career solo tackles list with 259.

He was named an All-American in 1977 and 1978. The Chicago Tribune named him the MVP of the Big Ten in 1978. He graduated from OSU in 1979. In 2016, he became the 25th Ohio State player, along with seven Buckeye coaches, to be named to the College Football Hall of Fame.

== Professional football career ==
Cousineau was selected first overall in the 1979 NFL draft by the Buffalo Bills, who acquired the pick as a part of a package of five draft picks from the San Francisco 49ers in a 1978 trade for O. J. Simpson. However, he never played a game for the Bills. He instead signed with the Canadian Football League's Montreal Alouettes, who signed him for double the money originally offered by the Bills. Cousineau became a star for the Alouettes, becoming the Grey Cup Most Valuable Player in the 1979 season. He only played in four games in his third season because of an elbow injury while the Alouettes collapsed.

In 1982, Cousineau wanted to return to the NFL, choosing to forego two optional years with the Alouettes. The Houston Oilers attempted to sign him, but the Bills (who still held Cousineau's NFL rights) matched the offer. Cleveland Browns owner Art Modell had long been interested in signing him. As a result, Cousineau was traded from the Bills to the Cleveland Browns for a first-round draft choice (14th overall) in the 1983 NFL draft, plus a second and a third draft choice in subsequent years. That first-round pick was used on future Hall of Fame quarterback Jim Kelly. Cousineau signed a five-year contract for $2.5 million, the highest contract ever at the time by the Browns.

During Cousineau's four seasons with the Browns, he led the team in tackles for three seasons. In the 1983 season, he intercepted 4 passes and was named a 2nd-team All-NFL by the NEA. He was also named 2nd-team all NFL by the AP in 1984, but never made the Pro Bowl in his career. In 1986, after a strong preseason by Anthony Griggs and Mike Johnson, the Browns waived Cousineau. Cousineau and his agent blamed his departure from Cleveland on false rumors that Cousineau was a homosexual, a charge Browns owner Art Modell denied.

On September 3, 1986, Cousineau was claimed off waivers by the San Francisco 49ers. He played two years as a reserve before retiring in 1987. Cousineau finished his NFL career with ten interceptions and 6.5 career sacks. Due to his disappointing NFL career, Cousineau is considered to be a draft bust.

== Honors post-retirement ==
St. Edward inducted Cousineau to the school's Athletic Hall of Fame.

On April 20, 2009, Cousineau joined the St. Vincent – St. Mary High School football coaching staff as a linebackers coach. Cousineau later went on to be the linebackers coach at St. Edward High School, where he had played football during his high school years.

== Personal life ==
In 1983, Cousineau was arrested in connection with minor collision with a police car on Saint Patrick's Day He was charged with drunk driving, improperly using traffic lanes, and not having his driver's license. His first trial ended in a mistrial after the jury deadlocked 6–2 with the majority favoring acquittal. He subsequently was found not guilty of the drunk driving charge, but was found guilty of the moving violation (the driver's license charge was dropped after he produced his license). He was ultimately fined $25 plus court costs.

Cousineau married his wife Lisa on June 16, 1990, and the two have 2 daughters, Kyle and Kacey.

On February 8, 2006, Cousineau announced plans to run for a seat in the Ohio House of Representatives as a Republican in the Akron, Ohio area. He won the May primary but lost the November election to Democrat Brian Williams by a margin of 58% to 42%.
