= Hugh Hindman =

American college athletics administrator (1927–1994)

Biographical details
- Born: April 18, 1927; Toledo, Ohio, U.S.
- Died: October 12, 1994 (aged 67); Columbus, Ohio, U.S.

Playing career
- 1947–1949: Miami (OH)
- Position: Guard

Coaching career (HC unless noted)

Football
- 1950–1952: Grandview HS (OH)
- 1953–1957: North HS (OH)
- 1958–1962: Ohio (OL)
- 1963–1969: Ohio State (assistant)

Administrative career (AD unless noted)
- 1970–1977: Ohio State (asst. AD)
- 1977–1984: Ohio State

Accomplishments and honors

Championships
- 1 College football national championship (1968)

Hugh David Hindman Jr. (April 18, 1927 – October 12, 1994) was an American football coach and college athletics administrator who was the athletic director at Ohio State University from 1977 to 1984.

== Early life ==
Hindman was born in Toledo, Ohio, on April 18, 1927, to Hugh David and Alpha (Westfall) Hindman. He had two brothers – actor Bill Hindman and high school football coach Dick Hindman.

Hindman grew up in Youngstown, Ohio, where his father was the city finance director, and Columbus, Ohio. Hindman played quarterback at Columbus' North High School. From 1947 to 1949, he played guard at Miami (OH).

== Coaching ==
Hindman began his coaching career at Grandview High School in Columbus. In 1953, he returned to NHS as head football coach. He led NHS to city championships in 1956 and 1957. In 1958, he was named an assistant to Bill Hess at Ohio. In 1963, he became an assistant at Ohio State under Woody Hayes, whom he had played for at Miami. He replaced Bo Schembechler, who left OSU to become head coach at rival Michigan. He was on the coaching staff during the Buckeyes' 1968 national championship season.

== Administration ==
On July 1, 1970, Hindman succeeded the retiring Floyd Stahl as Ohio State's assistant athletic director. He was promoted to AD in 1970 upon the retirement of J. Edward Weaver. Under Hindman, Ohio State expanded to 31 varsity sports, making it the largest athletic program in the NCAA. He also created the Buckeyes Club, a fundraising program that covered the cost of athletic grant-in-aid programs.

On December 30, 1978, Hindman fired legendary coach Woody Hayes after he struck an opposing player during the Gator Bowl. Hindman hired Hayes' successor, Earle Bruce, who went 81–26–1 in his nine years as head coach.

During his later years in office, Hindman dealt with the Art Schlichter gambling scandal, the Mike Tomczak, Joe Concheck, and Alan Kortokrax eligibility cases, an alleged gang rape involving several football players, and an NCAA rule violation by Earle Bruce. On February 14, 1984, Ohio State president Edward H. Jennings announced that Hindman was taking early retirement effective June 30.

== Personal life and death ==
On June 12, 1953, Hindman married Nancy Nafzger. They had three daughters.

Hindman underwent surgery for lung cancer in 1979. He died on October 12, 1994, from complications from pneumonia, at Riverside Methodist Hospital. He was 67 years old.
