= Keith Jackson =

American sports announcer (1928–2018)

- Jackson at Falcon Stadium in 1986
- Born: Keith Max Jackson; October 18, 1928; Roopville, Georgia, US
- Died: January 12, 2018 (aged 89); Los Angeles, California, US
- Education: Washington State University
- Occupations: Sports commentator, journalist, author, radio personality
- Years active: 1952–2006
- Spouse: Turi Ann Jackson (m. 1954)
- Children: Three

Keith Max Jackson (October 18, 1928 – January 12, 2018) was an American sports commentator, journalist, author, and radio personality, known for his career with ABC Sports (1966–2006). While he covered a variety of sports over his career, he is best known for his coverage of college football from 1952 until 2006 and his distinctive voice, that according to Steve Kelley in The Seattle Times was "a throwback voice, deep and operatic. A voice that was to college football what Edward R. Murrow's was to war. It was the voice of ultimate authority in his profession."

== Early life ==
A farmer's son, Jackson was born in Roopville, Georgia and grew up on a farm outside Carrollton, near the Alabama state line. He was the only surviving child in a poor family and grew up listening to sports on the radio. After enlisting and serving as a mechanic in the United States Marine Corps, he attended Washington State University in Pullman under the G.I. Bill. Jackson began as a political science major, but he became interested in broadcasting. He graduated in 1954 with a degree in speech communications.

== Broadcast career ==
Though best known for his college football broadcasts, Jackson announced numerous other sports for ABC throughout his career, including Major League Baseball, NBA basketball, boxing, auto racing, PGA Tour golf, the USFL, and the Olympic Games. He briefly worked college basketball with Dick Vitale. Jackson also served as the pregame, halftime, and postgame anchor for ABC's coverage of Super Bowl XXII in 1988. During his on-air tenure, he is credited with nicknaming the Rose Bowl as "The Grandaddy of Them All" and Michigan Stadium as "The Big House".

=== Early assignments ===
Jackson began his career as a broadcaster in 1952, when he called a game between Stanford and Washington State on the Tidewater Associated Oil Co. radio network. He then worked for KOMO radio in Seattle, and later for KOMO-TV from 1954 to 1964 as co-anchor for their first news team (first co-anchor news team on the West Coast) covering Seafair hydroplane races, minor league Seattle Rainiers baseball games, and University of Washington football games. In 1958, Jackson became the first American sports announcer to broadcast an event from the Soviet Union, a crew race between the Washington Huskies and a Soviet team. Despite heavy suspicion and numerous hurdles by the Soviet authorities, Jackson and his cohorts were able to cover the race: the first ever American sports victory on Russian soil.

Jackson became a radio news correspondent for ABC News Radio and sports director of ABC Radio West in 1964 before joining ABC Sports in 1966. He helped Walter Cronkite cover the 1964 Republican National Convention in San Francisco.

=== Professional football ===
In the early 1960s, Jackson covered American Football League games. In 1970, he was chosen to be the first play-by-play announcer on Monday Night Football covering the NFL, but he remained in that capacity only for the program's first season. Frank Gifford was ABC's initial target, but could not get out of his CBS contract until after the 1970 season. In 1971, however, Gifford landed the job. Jackson found out that he had been taken off the Monday Night package from 38 messages, not from Roone Arledge himself. This incident led to some contention between Jackson and the brass at ABC. With Gifford's death in August 2015, Jackson became the last surviving member of the broadcast teams that called MNF games from the early 1970s.

Jackson was the lead play-by-play announcer for the United States Football League broadcasts on ABC from 1983 to 1985. He was paired with Lynn Swann and Tim Brant. He called all three championship games in the league's short history.

As previously mentioned, for ABC's broadcast of Super Bowl XXII at the end of the 1987 season, Jackson served as the host for the pregame, halftime, and postgame coverage.

=== Olympic Games ===
Jackson was involved in the ABC coverage of the 1972 Summer Olympics and continued to contribute even when an attack by Palestinian terrorists transformed the coverage from that of a typical sporting event to a greater international and historical news event. In all, he covered a total of 10 Summer and Winter Olympic Games. Jackson covered swimming at the 1972 Summer Olympics and track and field at the 1976 Summer Olympics. He covered speed-skating during the 1980 Winter Olympics featuring Eric Heiden. He was offered the position of play-by-play for hockey, but turned it down (the position ultimately went to Al Michaels). Jackson called speed skating and ski jumping at the 1984 Winter Olympics. He covered basketball in 1984. He was the weekend afternoon host for ABC's final Olympics in 1988 from Calgary.

=== NBA ===
Jackson was ABC's lead basketball play-by-play announcer (succeeding Chris Schenkel in the role) with NBA Hall of Famer Bill Russell for two years (1971–1973) until ABC lost the NBA broadcasting rights to CBS following the conclusion of the 1973 Finals.

=== Wide World of Sports ===
Jackson was a regular part of ABC's popular Wide World of Sports (WWOS), covering both popular sports and obscure events like wrist wrestling. For WWOS, he covered Evel Knievel's successful jump at Exhibition Stadium, in Toronto, Ontario, Canada, on August 20, 1974; He also handled WWOS's first coverage of boxer Sugar Ray Leonard at the North American Continental Boxing Championships on July 26, 1975, who Jackson called a young boxer to watch. He teamed with Jackie Stewart and Chris Economaki in (WWOS) coverage of auto racing; among the notable events covered by Jackson was the 1974 Firecracker 400 at Daytona International Speedway and the 1975 Indianapolis 500. In the mid-1970s, Jackson also broadcast the United States Grand Prix motocross races from Carlsbad, California.

=== Major League Baseball ===
In baseball, Jackson, alongside former Mets, Phillies, Yankees, and Cardinals broadcaster Tim McCarver, called the famous 16-inning Game Six of the 1986 National League Championship Series between the New York Mets and Houston Astros. That turned out to be the final Major League Baseball game that Jackson would broadcast. Jackson had previously broadcast ABC's coverage of the 1977, 1979, and 1981 World Series (Jackson split play-by-play duties with Al Michaels for the latter two with Jackson calling the games at the American League site), the 1978, 1980, and 1982 All-Star Game (again, sharing play-by-play duties with Michaels for the latter two), the 1980 National League Championship Series, the 1976, 1978 and 1982 American League Championship Series, the 1981 American League Division Series, and the 1978 American League East tie-breaker game between the New York Yankees and Boston Red Sox (alongside Don Drysdale). Jackson also called various Monday Night Baseball and other regular-season games for ABC throughout the late 1970s and early 1980s.

Jackson's lead role on ABC's college football coverage occasionally interfered with his postseason baseball commitments. For instance, he was unavailable to call Game 1 of the 1976 ALCS because he had just finished calling an Oklahoma vs. Texas college football game for ABC. Thus, Bob Uecker filled in for Jackson for Game 1. In 1978, Jackson called another Oklahoma-Texas football game for ABC on the afternoon of October 7, then flew to New York, arriving just in time to call Game 4 of the 1978 ALCS that same night. On October 11, 1980, Jackson once again called an Oklahoma-Texas football game for ABC in the afternoon, then flew to Houston to call Game 4 of the 1980 National League Championship Series. In the meantime, Drysdale filled in for him on play-by-play for the early innings. On October 10, 1981, he called another Oklahoma v. Texas college football game for ABC and missed Game 4 of the ALCS. Again, Drysdale filled-in for him on play-by-play in his absence alongside color commentator Howard Cosell.

=== College basketball ===
Starting in 1987, he was ABC's lead play-by-play announcer for college basketball, teaming with analyst Dick Vitale. This partnership lasted until 1992.

=== College football ===
Jackson received the most acclaim for his coverage of college football. He genuinely enjoyed the sport and its purity. Jackson began announcing college football when television play-by-play announcers did not always have regular analysts. He would only once miss working a college season in his over 50 years (when he served as play-by-play announcer during the inaugural season of Monday Night Football), beginning in 1952. Jackson was joined in the booth by Joe Paterno for the 1974 Michigan-Ohio State game in Columbus, while Woody Hayes accompanied him for the 1974 Notre Dame-USC game. In his many years covering college football, Jackson was paired with many color commentators, including Jackie Jensen (1966–1968), Lee Grosscup (1972–1973), Bud Wilkinson (1969–1975), Darrell Royal (1974), Ara Parseghian (1975–1980), Frank Broyles (1978–1985), Lynn Swann (1984–1985), Tim Brant (1986, 2000–2002), Bob Griese (1987–1999), and Dan Fouts (2002–2005). Jackson called 16 Sugar Bowls and 15 Rose Bowls for ABC.

For many years, he was assigned by ABC to the primary national game of the week. His quirky expressions such as "Whoa, Nellie!", "Fum-BLE!" and "Hold the phonnnnne!" (following a penalty flag) are often the subject of comedic imitation. Though he greatly popularized it, Jackson notes that he learned the term "Whoa, Nellie" from earlier television announcer Dick Lane. He has often referred to offensive and defensive line players as the Big Uglies, or to an individual by saying "That guy...is a hoss" (horse). Jackson is also credited with coining the nickname for Michigan Stadium, The Big House. In the season before his first retirement, during what was thought to be his final game at The Big House, the Michigan Marching Band's halftime show concluded by spelling out "Thanks Keith" across the field. The 111,019 fans turned toward the press box, stood up and cheered for the commentator. As a part of the halftime event former Michigan coach Bo Schembechler presented Jackson with a jersey with "The Big House" across the front and a Michigan football helmet.

During the mid-'80s, he began falling out of favor with ABC executives due to the rise of stars such as Al Michaels and Jim Lampley. Jackson's contract expired after the 1986 Sugar Bowl. He had a 3-month "retirement" until new ABC Sports President Dennis Swanson personally offered him a 3-year contract, which he accepted.

In the 1990s, Jackson recorded videos for the centennial of the Alabama Crimson Tide. In 2006, Jackson introduced the Nebraska Cornhuskers' "Tunnel Walk" video on the stadium "HuskerVision" screens. This video played before every home game at Memorial Stadium in the 2006 season. It was also used for one home game in 2007, against Texas A&M. On September 26, 2009, for the 300th consecutive sellout of Memorial Stadium, Jackson again provided a video tribute to the fans of Nebraska.

Jackson's connections to the University of Nebraska remain strong. It was Jackson himself that the university contacted when designing its new press box facility—Jackson's advice included a recommendation that it include a separate restroom inside the broadcast booth, as few if any broadcast booths had any suitable restroom facilities. When Jackson broadcast the Nebraska-California game the following season (the debut of the Cornhuskers' new pressbox), he found a restroom in the booth with a sign reading "The Keith Jackson Memorial Bippy." The sign was a joke from Jackson's longtime friend, Nebraska sports information director Don Bryant. The name stuck, and a permanent plaque was put up next to the restroom door that reads "The Keith Jackson Toilet Facility – Dedicated Sept 11, 1999".

Jackson would call the 1972 USC Trojans football team the greatest team he ever saw. Jackson, who was in his first year in ABC football broadcasting narrating the taped highlights of the 1967 USC vs. UCLA football game, declared it many years later to be the greatest game he has ever seen.

Jackson's career was not free of incidents. During the 1978 Gator Bowl, Jackson missed Ohio State Head Coach Woody Hayes' infamous punch of Clemson defensive lineman Charlie Bauman. Bauman had intercepted a pass and was pushed out of bounds on the Ohio State sidelines, and a frustrated Hayes threw a forearm at Bauman's throat. Jackson and color commentator Ara Parseghian failed to see or comment on Hayes' actions, which had been captured from a different vantage point on camera. No replay of the actual incident was available in the booth during the telecast, as the television crew was working with limited replay capability. In addition to this, no sideline reporter was available to provide information on the cause of the unsportsmanlike penalties that occurred as a result. This led to accusations that Jackson was protecting Hayes, who was later fired for the incident.

=== Retirement ===
Approaching his 70th birthday, Jackson announced his first retirement from college football at the end of the 1998 season and his intention to live full-time at his home in California. Choosing the first BCS National Championship Game as his last broadcast, Jackson called the 1999 National Championship at the Fiesta Bowl between Tennessee and Florida State. He concluded the program by stating "Tennessee 23, Florida State 16. And so it is done. I say goodbye to all of you. God bless and good night."

Jackson rescinded his decision the following fall and began to do a more limited schedule of games, teamed with Dan Fouts, Tim Brant, and later Fouts again, almost exclusively sticking to venues on the West Coast, closer to his home in California. Two notable exceptions were the 2003 Michigan–Ohio State and the 2005 Oklahoma vs. Texas game. Each was the 100th meeting between the two archrivals. He strongly hinted that he was interested in retiring for good after the 2005 season, telling The New York Times that he was feeling his age after 53 seasons and had become upset at the increased number of mistakes in his play calling in the last few years. ABC tried convincing Jackson to stay, but his decision was firm. He officially announced his retirement on April 27, 2006, noting he did not want to "die in a stadium parking lot." His last game call was the iconic 2006 Rose Bowl featuring Texas vs. Southern California in the BCS National Championship Game, widely considered one of the greatest college football games of all time. The game was the last college football game shown on ABC under the "ABC Sports" brand, as ABC Sports was integrated with ESPN the following summer and is now known as ESPN on ABC.

=== Big Ten Icons ===
In March 2010, the Big Ten Conference announced that Jackson would host a 20-episode series called Big Ten Icons for the Big Ten Network which would highlight what the Big Ten Conference considers the league's top 50 student-athletes. The series was presented countdown style, and the top Big Ten student athlete was revealed during a program broadcast during the 2011 Big Ten Basketball tournament.

== Film and television appearances ==
Jackson had a minor career as an actor, often either playing himself, as on an episode of Coach; or a sportscaster like himself, as in The Fortune Cookie (1966), appearing in the first speaking role of the film "Football Announcer" as a CBS play-by-play man, a network for whom he never worked. He has also appeared in and narrated several sports documentaries. His play-by-play of the 1977 World Series is used in the background of the Spike Lee film, Summer of Sam (1999). In 2007, he appeared in clips and voice on the ESPN original series, The Bronx Is Burning, featuring clips from ABC's Monday Night Baseball, and ABC Sports' coverage of the 1977 World Series.

Jackson has appeared in numerous commercials, especially in the latter stages of his career. He once parodied his broadcast persona for a Miller Lite beer commercial, in which he played the officiating minister at a wedding, finishing with his famous line, "Whoa, Nellie!" He also appeared in commercials for Shoney's, a chain of family-style restaurants well known in the Southeast, especially in his native Georgia. Jackson appeared in "The Legend of Gatorade" ads, which he humorously alluded to during his live coverage of the 2006 Rose Bowl. In 2006, he also was shown in a commercial for Ice Breakers' Ice Cubes with Hilary Duff, Haylie Duff and Joey Lawrence, again contributing his famous "Whoa, Nellie!"

Jackson was portrayed by actor Shuler Hensley in the 2002 made-for-cable film Monday Night Mayhem, which aired on TNT. This film told the story of the initial seasons of Monday Night Football.

== Awards and honors ==
In 1999, the National Football Foundation awarded Jackson the Gold Medal Award, its highest honor. The same year he was inducted into the Rose Bowl Hall of Fame for his many years of contribution to "The Granddaddy of Them All". The Edward R. Murrow School of Communication at Washington State University awarded their alumnus with the Murrow Award for top leaders in the communication industry in 1999; Jackson was a charter member of the WSU Foundation, founded in 1979, provided scholarship money to the Murrow School and chaired the fund-raising drive for the school's alumni center. In 1994, Jackson was inducted into the American Sportscasters Association Hall of Fame. On April 24, 1995, he was inducted into the National Sportscasters and Sportswriters Association Hall of Fame, having won its National Sportscaster of the Year five successive times. The American Football Coaches Association awarded him its Amos Alonzo Stagg Award in 1993 as an individual "whose services have been outstanding in the advancement of the best interests of football." He was the first sports announcer to receive the Stagg award.

Longtime Penn State Head Coach Joe Paterno said of Jackson: "I don't think you could say that there is any one person who is not a coach, athletic director or administrator who has done more for college football than Keith Jackson". Michigan Head Coach Lloyd Carr described Jackson as "a symbol of all the good things in college football".

The Rose Bowl stadium's radio and TV booths were renamed "The Keith Jackson Broadcast Center" in December 2015.

In 2010, Jackson was awarded the honorary Doctor of Humane Letters (L.H.D.) from Whittier College.

In 2019, he was posthumously inducted into the Georgia Sports Hall of Fame.

== Personal life and death ==
Jackson and his wife, Turi Ann, resided in California and also spent time in British Columbia, where they owned a vacation property. They had three children: a daughter, Melanie Ann; and sons, Lindsey and Christopher. Son Lindsey is married to puppeteer Terri Hardin.

At the time of his death, he resided in the Sherman Oaks area of Los Angeles. On the subject of writing a book, Jackson admitted that he'd considered it, but joked that he would only sit down and work on one if he were to ever lose his golf swing.

Jackson died on January 12, 2018, at the age of 89.

== Notable broadcasts ==
=== 1950s ===
- September 20, 1958: Earliest surviving film of a Keith Jackson broadcast (college football game between Washington State and Stanford University).

=== 1970s ===
- September 21, 1970: First Monday Night Football game. Browns beat the Jets
- 1971 Daytona 500: Richard Petty won his 3rd Daytona 500.
- September 25, 1971: Carlos Monzón of Argentina stops Emile Griffith of the Virgin Islands in the 14th round to retain the Middleweight Championship of the World
- 1972 NBA All-Star Game
- 1972 NBA Finals: Los Angeles Lakers won the title.
- 1972 Summer Olympics: American swimmer Mark Spitz wins seven gold medals
- May 25, 1974: Rodrigo Valdez of Colombia knocks out Bennie Briscoe of Philadelphia in the 7th round to become the new Middleweight Champion of the World
- November 30, 1974: No. 6 USC vs. No. 5 Notre Dame – The "Earthquake Game"
- 1975 Indianapolis 500: Bobby Unser won the race that was shortened by rain.
- 1976 Summer Olympics
- 1976 American League Championship Series: New York Yankees vs. Kansas City Royals (including Chris Chambliss' series-winning home run in the bottom of the ninth inning of Game 5 off Mark Littell)
- January 1, 1977: 1977 Sugar Bowl - college football national championship
- 1977 World Series: New York Yankees vs. Los Angeles Dodgers (including Reggie Jackson's 3 homers on 3 pitches).
- October 22, 1977: No. 5 USC vs. No. 11 Notre Dame – The "Green Jersey Game"
- October 2, 1978: American League East Playoff – New York Yankees vs. Boston Red Sox (Bucky Dent's HR).
- December 29, 1978: Gator Bowl – Ohio State vs. Clemson (Woody Hayes' infamous last game)
- January 1, 1979: Sugar Bowl – No. 2 Alabama vs. No. 1 Penn State for the national championship
- 1979 World Series: Pittsburgh Pirates came back from a 3–1 deficit to beat the Baltimore Orioles in 7 games.

=== 1980s ===
- January 1, 1980: Sugar Bowl: No. 2 Alabama vs. No. 6 Arkansas (with the win Alabama won the national championship)
- 1980 Winter Olympics: U.S. speed skater Eric Heiden wins five gold medals.
- 1980 National League Championship Series: Philadelphia Phillies vs. Houston Astros (included extra-inning games in the final four games of best-of-five series).
- January 1, 1981: Sugar Bowl: No. 1 Georgia vs. No. 7 Notre Dame. (with the win Georgia won the national championship)
- 1981 World Series: Los Angeles Dodgers over New York Yankees in 6 games to capture their 5th world championship.
- November 28, 1981: Iron Bowl - Alabama 28 vs. Auburn 17 – Coach Paul "Bear" Bryant wins his 315th collegiate game as a head coach, surpassing Amos Alonzo Stagg as college football's winningest coach.
- November 27, 1982: Iron Bowl - Auburn 23 vs Alabama 22 – Bear Bryant's final Iron Bowl, "Bo Over the Top"
- January 1, 1983: Sugar Bowl – No. 1 Georgia vs. No. 2 Penn State for the national championship
- 1984 Summer Olympics: The USA basketball team, led by Michael Jordan and Patrick Ewing, wins gold.
- November 30, 1985: Iron Bowl Alabama 25 vs Auburn 23 – "The Kick"
- 1986 National League Championship Series: New York Mets vs. Houston Astros (included the 16-inning Game 6).
- May 17, 1987: NASCAR The Winston won by Dale Earnhardt ("The Pass in the Grass")
- July 4, 1987 NASCAR Pepsi Firecracker 400.
- February 19, 1989: NCAA Basketball, Indiana Hoosiers vs. Michigan Wolverines. Jay Edwards's last-second shot to beat Michigan (with Dick Vitale).
- March 5, 1989: NCAA Basketball, Indiana Hoosiers vs. Illinois Fighting Illini. Jay Edwards's shot with two seconds left to tie, then Nick Anderson's three-point shot to win at eventual Big Ten champion Indiana (also with Dick Vitale).

=== 1990s ===
- May 27, 1990: Monaco Grand Prix won by Ayrton Senna (Last auto race broadcast with Jackie Stewart)
- November 16, 1991: No. 2 Miami vs. No. 1 Florida State (a.k.a. "Wide Right I").
- November 23, 1991: No. 4 Michigan vs. No. 18 Ohio State ("Hello Heisman")
- January 1, 1992: Rose Bowl – No. 2 Washington vs. No. 3 Michigan (Washington won a split national championship)
- October 3, 1992: No. 3 Florida State vs. No. 2 Miami (a.k.a. "Wide Right II")
- January 1, 1993: Sugar Bowl – No. 2 Alabama vs. No. 1 Miami for the national championship
- September 24, 1994: No. 7 Colorado at No. 4 Michigan, The Miracle at Michigan
- January 2, 1997: Sugar Bowl – No. 1 Florida State vs. No. 3 Florida for the national championship
- January 1, 1998: Rose Bowl – No. 1 Michigan 21, No. 8 Washington State 16 (Michigan won a split national championship)
- January 4, 1999: Fiesta Bowl – No. 1 Tennessee 23, No. 2 Florida State 16 in the first BCS National Championship Game

=== 2000s ===
- January 4, 2002: Rose Bowl – Miami (FL) vs. Nebraska in 2002 BCS National Championship Game
- January 3, 2003: Fiesta Bowl – Miami (FL) vs. Ohio State in 2003 BCS National Championship Game
- November 22, 2003: Ohio State at Michigan (100th meeting)
- January 1, 2004: 2004 Rose Bowl – Michigan vs. USC (USC won a split national championship)
- October 8, 2005: Oklahoma vs. Texas (100th meeting)
- January 4, 2006: Rose Bowl – Texas vs. USC in 2006 BCS National Championship Game

Media offices
Preceded by None	Monday Night Football play-by-play announcer 1970	Succeeded by Frank Gifford
Preceded by Chris Schenkel	Lead play-by-play announcer, ABC College Football; 1974–1998	Succeeded by Brent Musburger
Preceded by Brent Musburger	Lead play-by-play announcer, ABC College Football; 2002	Succeeded by Brent Musburger
Preceded by Brad Nessler	Lead play-by-play announcer, ABC College Football; 2005	Succeeded by Brad Nessler
Preceded by Jim McKay	Television voice of the Indianapolis 500; 1975	Succeeded by Jim McKay
Preceded by Joe Garagiola	World Series network television play-by-play announcer (with Al Michaels in 1979 and 1981; concurrent with Joe Garagiola in odd numbered years); 1977–1981	Succeeded by Joe Garagiola and Dick Enberg
Preceded by Chris Schenkel	Play-by-play announcer, NBA Finals; 1972–1973	Succeeded by Pat Summerall
Preceded by None	Play-by-play announcer, BCS National Championship Game; 1999	Succeeded by Brent Musburger
Preceded by Brad Nessler	Play-by-play announcer, BCS National Championship Game; 2002–2003	Succeeded by Brent Musburger
Preceded by Brad Nessler	Play-by-play announcer, BCS National Championship Game; 2006	Succeeded by Thom Brennaman
Preceded by Dick Enberg	Play-by-play announcer, Rose Bowl; 1989–2006 (except 1993, 1997, 2003)	Succeeded by Brent Musburger
Preceded by Bob Prince	Lead play-by-play announcer, Major League Baseball on ABC; 1977–1982	Succeeded by Al Michaels
Preceded by Don Drysdale	#2 play-by-play announcer, Major League Baseball on ABC; 1986	Succeeded by Gary Bender
