= The Kick (college football) =

Oklahoma Sooners	Ohio State Buckeyes
(2–0)	(2–0)
29	28
Head coach: Barry Switzer	Head coach: Woody Hayes
AP / Coaches; 3 / 3	AP / Coaches; 4 / 4
	1	2	3	4	Total
Oklahoma	17	3	0	9	29
Ohio State	0	14	14	0	28
- Date: September 24, 1977
- Season: 1977
- Stadium: Ohio Stadium
- Location: Columbus, Ohio
- Attendance: 88,119

United States TV coverage
- Network: ABC
- Announcers: Keith Jackson and Ara Parseghian

The Kick refers to Uwe von Schamann's last second field goal in a September 24, 1977, college football game between the Oklahoma Sooners and Ohio State Buckeyes at Ohio Stadium in Columbus, Ohio. The kick eventually went down in Sooners' lore as one of the most memorable plays in Oklahoma history.

== The game ==
This was the first ever meeting between Ohio State and Oklahoma.

Within the first four minutes of the game, Oklahoma jumped out to a 14–0 lead. Oklahoma led 17–0 after the first quarter.

Uwe von Schamann made a field goal early in the second quarter to put the Sooners ahead 20–0. However, at that point, Oklahoma star running back Billy Sims had a nagging ankle injury and the team's starting quarterback Thomas Lott hurt his hamstring. All of a sudden, Oklahoma couldn't move the ball, and Ohio State began to capitalize. They scored a pair of touchdowns to make it 20–14 by halftime, then scored a pair of touchdowns in the third quarter to take a 28–20 lead.

Oklahoma would score a touchdown late in the game, but the game-tying two-point conversion attempt failed.

== The play ==
It appeared at that point that Oklahoma was going to lose. However, Oklahoma recovered Schamann's onside kick with just enough time to set up a potential game-winning field goal. After a pass got the Sooners in von Schamann's range, Switzer called back-to-back running plays to set up the ball in the middle of the field. As the clock ticked down, he called time with six seconds left.

Woody Hayes called timeout to ice the kicker, but that only seemed to invigorate him. After hearing fans scream "block that kick" during the timeout, von Schamann turned to the crowd and started cheering with them. He raised his arms up and down, imploring them to be louder, then hit the 41-yd field goal with three seconds left to win it for Oklahoma 29–28.
