= 1978 Ohio State Buckeyes football team =

American college football season

1978 Ohio State Buckeyes football
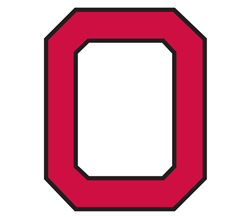

Gator Bowl, L 15–17 vs. Clemson
- Conference: Big Ten Conference
- Record: 7–4–1 (6–2 Big Ten)
- Head coach: Woody Hayes (28th season)
- Offensive coordinator: Alex Gibbs (4th season)
- Defensive coordinator: George Hill (8th season)
- MVP: Tom Cousineau
- Captains: Byron Cato; Tom Cousineau; Ron Springs; Tim Vogler
- Home stadium: Ohio Stadium

1978 Big Ten Conference football standings
	Conf.					Overall
Team	W		L		T	W		L		T
No. 5 Michigan +	7	–	1	–	0	10	–	2	–	0
No. 12 Michigan State +	7	–	1	–	0	8	–	3	–	0
No. 13 Purdue	6	–	1	–	1	9	–	2	–	1
Ohio State	6	–	2	–	0	7	–	4	–	1
Minnesota	4	–	4	–	0	5	–	6	–	0
Wisconsin	3	–	4	–	2	5	–	4	–	2
Indiana	3	–	5	–	0	4	–	7	–	0
Iowa	2	–	6	–	0	2	–	9	–	0
Illinois	0	–	6	–	2	1	–	8	–	2
Northwestern	0	–	8	–	1	0	–	10	–	1
+ – Conference co-champions; Rankings from AP Poll

The 1978 Ohio State Buckeyes football team was an American football team that represented the Ohio State University as a member of the Big Ten Conference during the 1978 Big Ten season. In their 28th year under head coach Woody Hayes, the Buckeyes compiled a 7–4–1 record (6–2 in conference games), finished in fourth place in the Big Ten, and outscored opponents by a total of 324 to 199. In games against ranked opponents, they lost to No. 5 Penn State, No. 6 Michigan, and No. 7 Clemson in the 1978 Gator Bowl. This was Woody Hayes' last season as head coach at Ohio State, as he was fired following an incident in the Gator Bowl in which he punched Clemson defender Charlie Bauman.

The Buckeyes gained an average of 263.3 rushing yards and 94.1 passing yards per game. On defense, they held opponents to 134.5 rushing yards and 151.2 passing yards per game. The team's individual statistical leaders included quarterback Art Schlichter (1,045 passing yards, 45.8% completion percentage), running back Paul Campbell (565 rushing yards, 4.3 yards per carry), and wide receiver Doug Donley (21 receptions for 466 yards). Linebacker Tom Cousineau was a consensus first-team All-American.

The team played its home games at Ohio Stadium in Columbus, Ohio.

== Schedule ==
Date	Time	Opponent	Rank	Site	TV	Result	Attendance	Source
September 16	1:30 p.m.	No. 5 Penn State*	No. 6	Ohio Stadium; Columbus, OH (rivalry)	ABC	L 0–19	88,203	
September 23	2:30 p.m.	at Minnesota	No. 16	Memorial Stadium; Minneapolis, MN		W 27–10	55,200	
September 30	1:30 p.m.	Baylor*	No. 13	Ohio Stadium; Columbus, OH		W 34–28	87,998	
October 7	1:30 p.m.	SMU*	No. 14	Ohio Stadium; Columbus, OH		T 35–35	87,721	
October 14	2:30 p.m.	at Purdue	No. 16	Ross–Ade Stadium; West Lafayette, IN		L 16–27	69,465	
October 21	1:30 p.m.	Iowa		Ohio Stadium; Columbus, OH		W 31–7	87,326	
October 28	1:30 p.m.	Northwestern		Ohio Stadium; Columbus, OH		W 63–20	87,296	
November 4	2:00 p.m.	at Wisconsin		Camp Randall Stadium; Madison, WI		W 49–14	79,940	
November 11	1:30 p.m.	Illinois		Ohio Stadium; Columbus, OH (Illibuck)		W 45–7	87,819	
November 18	1:30 p.m.	at Indiana	No. 19	Memorial Stadium; Bloomington, IN		W 21–18	47,540	
November 25	12:30 p.m.	No. 6 Michigan	No. 16	Ohio Stadium; Columbus, OH (rivalry)	ABC	L 3–14	88,358	
December 29	9:00 p.m.	vs. No. 7 Clemson*	No. 20	Gator Bowl Stadium; Jacksonville, FL (Gator Bowl)	ABC	L 15–17	72,011	
*Non-conference game; Rankings from AP Poll released prior to the game; All times are in Eastern time

== Game summaries ==
=== Penn State ===
Team	1	2	3	4	Total
• Penn St	3	0	7	9	19
Ohio St	0	0	0	0	0

- Date: September 18
- Location: Ohio Stadium
- Game start: 1:00 p.m. EST
- Elapsed time: 2:48
- Game attendance: 88,202
- Game weather: Cloudy; 80 °F (27 °C); wind 10 mph (16 km/h) SW
- Television network: ABC

Scoring summary
Q1	9:52	PSU	Bahr 30 yard field goal	PSU 3–0
Q3	4:52	PSU	Suhey 3 yard run (Bahr kick)	PSU 10–0
Q4	13:12	PSU	Bahr 41 yard field goal	PSU 13–0
Q4	6:45	PSU	Bahr 25 yard field goal	PSU 16–0
Q4	2:53	PSU	Bahr 30 yard field goal	PSU 19–0

Art Schlichter started the game at quarterback while Rod Gerald, the starter for the two previous seasons, opened the game at split end.

=== Minnesota ===
Ohio State Buckeyes (0–1) at Minnesota Golden Gophers

Quarter	1	2	3	4	Total
Ohio St	7	14	0	6	27
Minnesota	0	0	0	7	7

at Memorial Stadium • Minneapolis, Minnesota

- Date: September 23
- Game time: 1:30 p.m.
- Game weather: Sunny • 71 °F (22 °C) • Wind SW 20 miles per hour (32 km/h; 17 kn)
- Game attendance: 55,200
- Referee: R. McVay

Game information

Ohio St

- Schlichter
  3/7, 57 Yds, INT
- Springs
  17 Rush, 82 Yds, TD
- Donley
  2 Rec, 57 Yds

Minnesota

- Avery
  6/14, 95 Yds, 2 INT
- Barber
  17 Rush, 57 Yds
- Bailey
  3 Rec, 62 Yds

Scoring summary

Quarter	Time	Drive			Team	Scoring information	Score	
Quarter	Time	Plays	Yards	TOP	Team	Scoring information	OSU	MINN
1	11:02	6	17	3:58	Ohio St	Schlichter 3-yard touchdown run, Janakievski kick good	7	0
2	14:28	10	51		Ohio St	Payton 1-yard touchdown run, Janakievski kick good	14	0
2	1:31	8	54		Ohio St	Schlichter 1-yard touchdown run, Janakievski kick good	21	0
2	0:04	5	58		Minnesota	39-yard field goal by Rogind	21	3
4	12:48	11	41		Ohio St	Springs 3-yard touchdown run, Janakievski kick no good	27	3
4	1:41	6	17		Minnesota	Dilulo 15-yard touchdown reception from Carlson, Rogind kick good	27	10
"TOP" = time of possession. For other American football terms, see Glossary of American football.							27	10

=== Wisconsin ===
Team	1	2	3	4	Total
• Ohio State	7	14	14	14	49
Wisconsin	0	7	0	7	14

- Date: November 4
- Location: Camp Randall Stadium, Madison, WI
- Game attendance: 79,940

Scoring summary
1	OSU	Schlichter 1-yard run (Janakievski kick)	OSU 7-0
2	OSU	Otha Watson recovered blocked punt in end zone (Janakievski kick)	OSU 14-0
2	WIS	Charles 7-yard pass from Kalasmlki (Veith kick)	OSU 14-7
2	OSU	Ty Hicks 96-yard kickoff return (Janakievski kick)	OSU 21-7
3	OSU	Skillings 61-yard interception return (Janakievski kick)	OSU 28-7
3	OSU	Murray 14-yard run (Janakievski kick)	OSU 35-7
4	OSU	Castignola 15-yard run (Janakievski kick)	OSU 42-7
4	OSU	Castignola 6-yard run (Jankievski kick)	OSU 49-7
4	WIS	Green 1-yard run (Veith kick)	OSU 49-14

=== Illinois ===
Team	1	2	3	4	Total
Illinois	0	7	0	0	7
• Ohio St	7	7	10	21	45

- Date: November 11
- Location: Ohio Stadium, Columbus, OH
- Game attendance: 87,719

Scoring summary
Q1	OHST	Schlichter 7 yard run (Janakievski kick)	OHST 7–0
Q2	ILL	Powell 2 yard run (Finzer kick)	Tie 7–7
Q2	OHST	Schlichter 7 yard run (Janakievski kick)	OHST 14–7
Q3	OHST	Atha 31 yard field goal	OHST 17–7
Q3	OHST	Campbell 1 yard run (Janakievski kick)	OHST 24–7
Q4	OHST	Schlichter 5 yard run (Janakievski kick)	OHST 31–7
Q4	OHST	Gerald 7 yard run (Janakievski kick)	OHST 38–7
Q4	OHST	Johnson 8 yard run (Janakievski kick)	OHST 45–7

=== At Indiana ===
Ohio State Buckeyes (6–2–1) at Indiana Hoosiers (4–5)

Quarter	1	2	3	4	Total
Ohio St	7	0	7	7	21
Indiana	7	3	0	8	18

at Memorial Stadium, Bloomington, Indiana

- Date: November 18, 1978
- Game weather: Overcast • 41 °F (5 °C) • Wind 8 miles per hour (13 km/h; 7.0 kn) to 10 miles per hour (16 km/h; 8.7 kn)
- Game attendance: 47,540

Game information

First quarter

- OSU – Paul Campbell 3-yard run (Vlade Janakievski kick), 10:19. Ohio St 7–0. Drive:
- IU – Mike Harkrader 1-yard run (David Freud kick), 2:04. Tie 7–7. Drive:

Second quarter

- IU – David Freud 30-yard field goal, 6:52. Indiana 10–7. Drive:

Third quarter

- OSU – Art Schlichter 3-yard run (Vlade Janakievski kick), 2:58. Ohio St 14–10. Drive: 20 plays, 98 yards.

Fourth quarter;

- OSU – Ricky Johnson 46-yard run (Vlade Janakievski kick), 13:13. Ohio St 21–10. Drive: 8 plays.
- IU – Darrick Burnett 1-yard run (pass good), 5:01. Ohio St 21–18. Drive:

Top passers

- OSU – Art Schlichter – 4/11, 22 yards, INT
- IU – Tim Clifford – 10/19, 81 yards

Top rushers

- OSU – Ricky Johnson – 18 rushes, 109 yards, TD
- IU – Darrick Burnett – 18 rushes, 65 yards, TD

Top receivers

- OSU – Ricky Johnson – 2 receptions, 9 yards
- IU – Dan Powers – 6 receptions, 62 yards

- Ricky Johnson played in place of the injured Ron Springs and Calvin Murray
- Woody Hayes' last victory as Ohio State's head coach

=== Michigan ===
Michigan Wolverines at Ohio State Buckeyes

Quarter	1	2	3	4	Total
Michigan	7	0	7	0	14
Ohio St	3	0	0	0	3

at Ohio Stadium, Columbus, Ohio

- Date: November 25, 1978
- Game time: 12:56 p.m.
- Game weather: Overcast, 40 °F (4 °C)
- Game attendance: 88,358
- TV: ABC

Game information

First quarter

- OSU – Bob Atha 29-yard field goal, 1:13. Ohio St 3–0. Drive: 6 plays, 38 yards, 2:12.
- MICH – Rodney Feaster 30-yard pass from Rick Leach (Gregg Willner kick), 0:09. Michigan 7–3. Drive: 4 plays, 70 yards, 0:59.

Third quarter

- MICH – Roosevelt Smith 11-yard pass from Rick Leach (Gregg Willner kick), 4:12. Michigan 14–3. Drive: 13 plays, 69 yards, 5:19.

Top passers

- MICH – Rick Leach – 11/21, 166 yards, 2 TD
- OSU – Art Schlichter – 4/9, 43 yards, INT

Top rushers

- MICH – Roosevelt Smith – 10 rushes, 67 yards
- OSU – Ron Springs – 12 rushes, 63 yards

Top receivers

- MICH – Doug Marsh – 2 receptions, 39 yards
- OSU – Rod Gerald – 1 reception, 25 yards

=== Gator Bowl (vs. Clemson) ===
Gator Bowl: #7 Clemson Tigers (10–1) vs. #20 Ohio State Buckeyes (7–3–1)

Quarter	1	2	3	4	Total
Ohio St	0	9	0	6	15
Clemson	0	10	7	0	17

at Gator Bowl, Jacksonville, Florida

- Date: December 29, 1978
- Game time: 9:00 p.m. EST
- Game attendance: 72,011
- Referee: Jim Artley
- TV: ABC

Game information

Second quarter

- OSU – Bob Atha 27-yard field goal, 12:08. Ohio St 3–0. Drive: 8 plays, 72 yards.
- CLEM – Steve Fuller 4-yard run (Obed Ariri kick), 5:03. Clemson 7–3. Drive: 15 plays, 80 yards.
- OSU – Art Schlichter 4-yard run (kick failed), 1:21. Ohio St 9–7. Drive: 9 plays, 78 yards.
- CLEM – Obed Ariri 47-yard field goal, 0:05. Clemson 10–9. Drive: 8 plays, 76 yards.

Third quarter

- CLEM – Cliff Austin 1-yard run (Ariri kick), 2:18. Clemson 17–9. Drive: 19 plays, 84 yards.

Fourth quarter

- OSU – Art Schlichter 1-yard run (run failed), 8:11. Clemson 17–15. Drive: 12 plays, 87 yards.

Top passers

- OSU – Art Schlichter – 16/20, 205 yards, INT
- CLEM – Steve Fuller – 9/20, 123 yards

Top rushers

- OSU – Art Schlichter – 18 rushes, 70 yards, 2 TD
- CLEM – Tracy Perry – 14 rushes, 54 yards

Warren Ratchford – 10 rushes, 54 yards

Top receivers

- OSU – Doug Donley – 3 receptions, 54 yards
- CLEM – Jerry Butler – 4 receptions, 44 yards

== Personnel ==
=== Roster ===
1978 Ohio State Buckeyes football team roster
Players
Coaches
Offense

Pos.	#	Name	Class
OL		Ernie Andria
TE		Ron Barwig
RB		Cliff Belmer
OL		Tim Brown
RB		Paul Campbell
QB		Greg Castignola
WR	47	Doug Donley	So
OL		Keith Ferguson
G	56	Ken Fritz	Jr
WR	8	Rod Gerald	Sr
RB		Ty Hicks
WR		Chuck Hunter
RB	21	Ricky Johnson
TE		Jimmy Moore
RB		Calvin Murray
RB		Joel Payton
OL		Joe Robinson
OL		Jim Savoca
QB	10	Art Schlichter	Fr
RB		Ron Springs (C)
QB		Mike Strahine
OL		Tim Vogler
RB		Ricardo Volley
OL		Tom Waugh

Defense

Pos.	#	Name	Class
CB	25	Todd Bell	So
DL		Byron Cato
LB	36	Tom Cousineau (C)	Sr
LB		Kelton Dansler
DL		Gary Dunn
CB	27	Ray Ellis	So
LB	65	Keith Ferguson	So
DB		Mike Guess
DL		Luther Henson
LB	5	Jim Laughlin	Jr
LB		Paul Ross
DB		Vince Skillings
DL		Mark Sullivan
LB		Al Washington

Special teams

Pos.	#	Name	Class
K		Bob Atha
K	13	Vlade Janakievski	Jr
P	19	Tom Orosz	So

Head coach

- Woody Hayes

Coordinators/assistant coaches

- Dave Adolph
- George Chaump
- Alex Gibbs
- George Hill
- Mickey Jackson
- Glen Mason
- Bill Myles
- Gary Tranquill

Legend

- (C) Team captain
- (S) Suspended
- (I) Ineligible
- Injured
- Redshirt

Roster

=== Depth chart ===
Defense

FS
Vince Skillings
Bob Murphy

WLB	ILB	ILB	SLB
Paul Ross	Al Washington	Tom Cousineau	Kelton Dansler
Jim Laughlin	Tony Megaro	Terry Vogler	⋅

ROV
Todd Bell
Duncan Griffin

CB
Mike Guess
⋅

DE	NT	DE
Byron Cato	Mark Sullivan	Gary Dulin
Joe Hornik	⋅	⋅

CB
Ray Ellis
Lenny Mills

Offense

SE
Rod Gerald
⋅

LT	LG	C	RG	RT
Keith Ferguson	Ken Fritz	Tim Vogler	Jim Savoca	Joe Robinson
Tim Burke	Scott Burris	Tom Waugh	⋅	Tim Brown

TE
Jimmy Moore
Jim Houston

FL
Doug Donley
⋅

QB
Art Schlichter
Greg Castignola

FB
Paul Campbell
Ricardo Volley

Special teams
PK Vlade Janakievski
PK Bob Atha
P Tom Orosz

LS John Hutchings

RB
Ron Springs
Ricky Johnson

== 1979 NFL draftees ==
Player	Round	Pick	Position	NFL club
Tom Cousineau	1	1	Linebacker	Buffalo Bills
Ron Springs	5	136	Running Back	Dallas Cowboys
Jimmy Moore	6	150	Guard	Baltimore Colts
Joe Robinson	9	229	Tackle	Kansas City Chiefs
