= Woody Hayes =

American football coach (1913–1987)

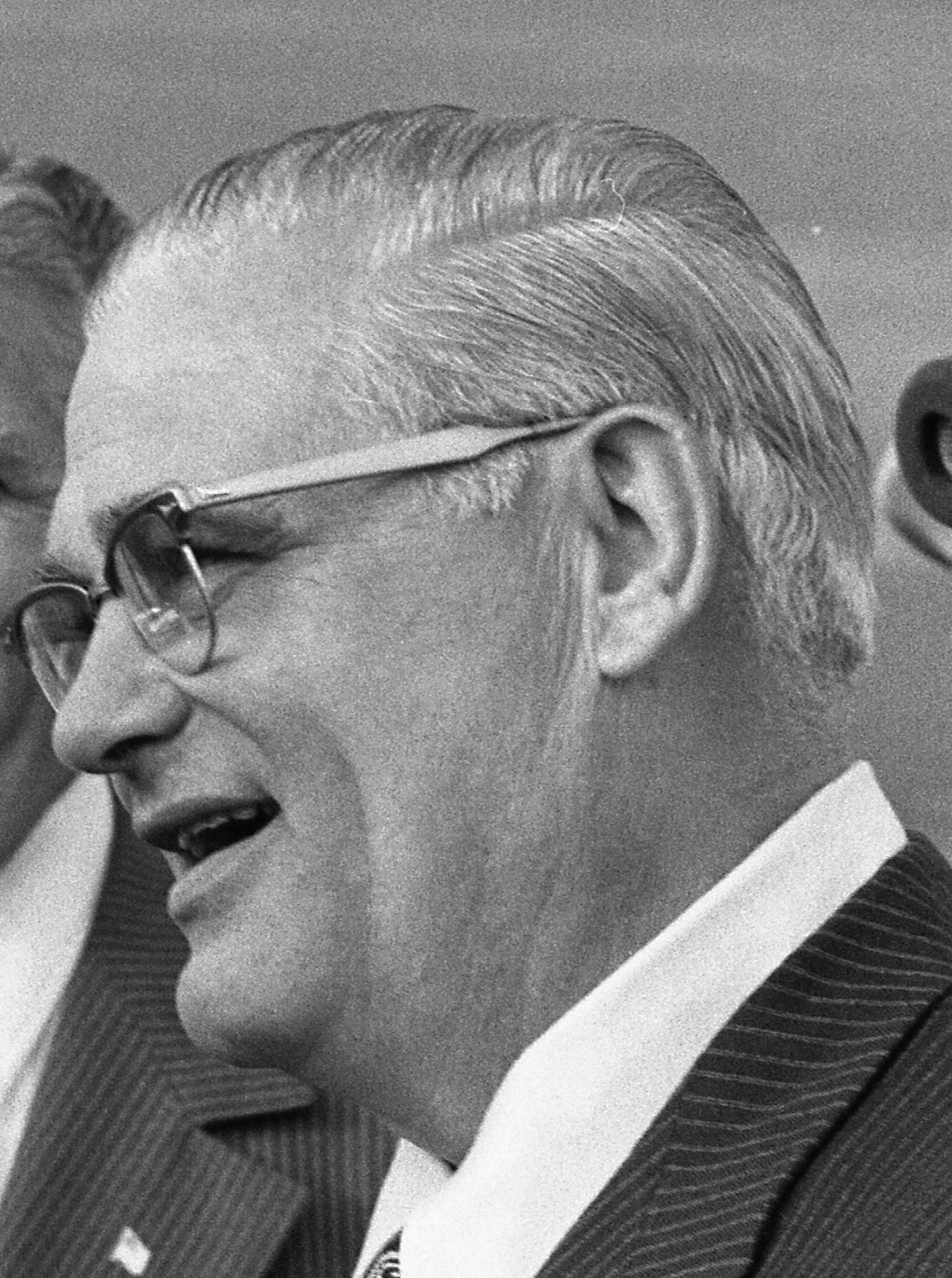
- Hayes in 1974

Biographical details
- Born: February 14, 1913; Clifton, Ohio, U.S.
- Died: March 12, 1987 (aged 74); Upper Arlington, Ohio, U.S.

Playing career
- 1933–1935: Denison
- Position: Tackle

Coaching career (HC unless noted)
- 1946–1948: Denison
- 1949–1950: Miami (OH)
- 1951–1978: Ohio State

Head coaching record
- Overall: 238–72–10 (college); 18–11–1 (high school)
- Bowls: 6–6

Accomplishments and honors

Championships
- 5 national (1954, 1957, 1961, 1968, 1970); OAC (1947); MAC (1950); 13 Big Ten (1954, 1955, 1957, 1961, 1968–1970, 1972–1977)

Awards
- AFCA Coach of the Year (1957); Sporting News College Football COY (1968); Walter Camp Coach of the Year Award (1968); 3× Eddie Robinson Coach of the Year (1957, 1968, 1975); Amos Alonzo Stagg Award (1986); 2× Big Ten Coach of the Year (1973, 1975)
- College Football Hall of Fame; Inducted in 1983 (profile)

Wayne Woodrow "Woody" Hayes (February 14, 1913 – March 12, 1987) was an American college football coach and player. He served as the head football coach at Denison University from 1946 to 1948, Miami University in Oxford, Ohio, from 1949 to 1950, and Ohio State University from 1951 to 1978, compiling a career college football coaching record of 238–72–10. Hayes is widely considered the greatest Ohio State coach of all time. He was inducted into the College Football Hall of Fame as a coach in 1983.

During his 28 seasons as the head coach of the Ohio State Buckeyes football program, Hayes' teams were recognized five times by NCAA consensus selectors as national champions (1954, 1957, 1961, 1968, 1970), credited as three – 1954, 1957, 1968 – by the major wire-services: AP Poll and Coaches' Poll. Additionally, his Buckeye teams captured 13 Big Ten Conference titles, and amassed a record of 205–61–10.

Over the last decade of his coaching tenure at Ohio State, Hayes's Buckeye squads faced off in a fierce rivalry against the Michigan Wolverines coached by Bo Schembechler, a former player under and assistant coach to Hayes. During that stretch in the Michigan–Ohio State football rivalry, dubbed "The Ten Year War", Hayes and Schembechler's teams won or shared the Big Ten Conference crown every season and usually each placed in the national rankings.

== Early years ==
A native of Clifton, Ohio, Hayes was the youngest of three children born to Wayne B. and Effie (née Hupp) Hayes. He played center at Newcomerstown High School in Newcomerstown, Ohio. At Denison University, he played tackle under coach Tom Rogers, and was a member of Sigma Chi fraternity. After graduating from Denison in 1935, Hayes went on to serve as an assistant at two Ohio high schools: Mingo Junction in 1935–1936 and New Philadelphia in 1937. When New Philadelphia head coach John Brickels left to accept another position, Hayes was elevated to the head coaching position, where he put together a 17–2–1 record in his first two seasons before enduring a 1–9 record in 1940.

Hayes enlisted in the United States Navy in July 1941, eventually rising to the rank of Lieutenant Commander during World War II. He commanded PC 1251 in the Palau Islands invasion and the destroyer-escort USS Rinehart in both the Atlantic and Pacific operations.

As World War II was near its end, and Hayes' alma mater, Denison University, was pursuing plans to reinstate its football program (which had been suspended during the war), it contacted former head coach Rogers (also in the Navy) about rejoining the program as head coach. Rogers declined, but recommended that his former team captain, Hayes, should be named the next head coach. Denison was able to locate and give Hayes an offer, which he accepted, minutes before his Navy ship was to begin the voyage through the Panama Canal — meaning Hayes would have been incommunicado for an extended period of time.

== Coaching at Denison and Miami University ==
Upon returning to Denison in 1946, Hayes had a hard first year, winning only 2 games, over Capital and the season finale against Wittenberg. However, that victory sparked a 19-game winning streak, a surge that propelled him into the head coaching position at Miami University. Miami is recognized as the "Cradle of Coaches" because of its history of outstanding coaches starting their careers there, such as Paul Brown, Ara Parseghian, Weeb Ewbank, John Pont, Bill Mallory, Sid Gillman, Randy Walker, and Bo Schembechler. After the 1947 season, Gillman moved down the road to coach at the University of Cincinnati, which was then Miami's chief rival. Hayes and Gillman maintained a sparkling feud between themselves, combining mutual distaste for the other's coaching style, and because they were in recruiting competition in the same general area.

In his second year with the Miami Redskins, Hayes led the 1950 team to an appearance in the Salad Bowl, where they defeated Arizona State. That success led him to accept the Ohio State head coaching position on February 18, 1951, in a controversial decision after the university rejected the applications of other more well-known coaches, including former Buckeyes' head coach Paul Brown, incumbent Buckeye assistant Harry Strobel, and Missouri head coach Don Faurot.

== Ohio State ==
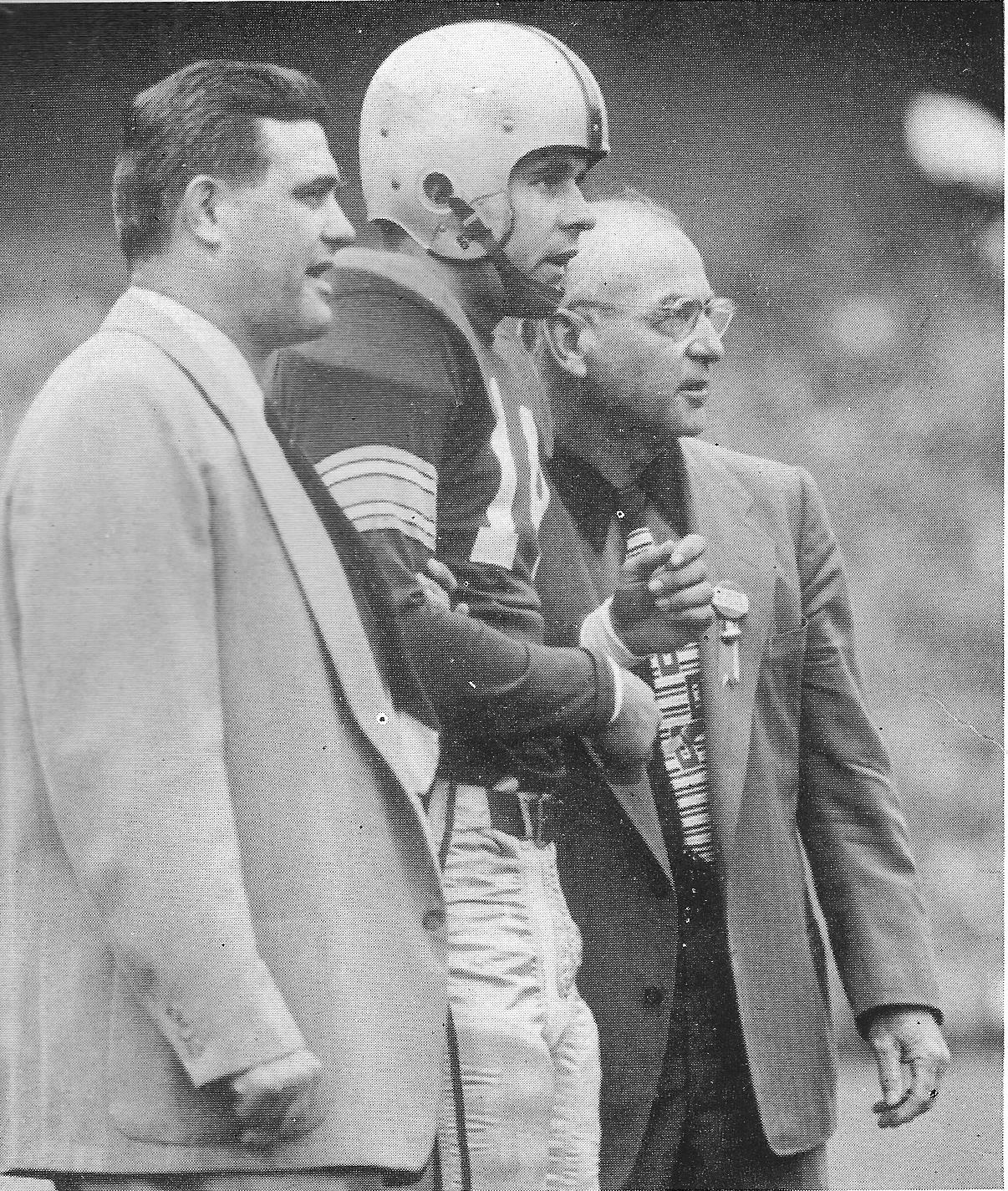
Hayes with fullback Dick Doyle and assistant coach Ernie Godfrey, 1952

As head coach of the Ohio State Buckeyes, Hayes led his teams to a 205–61–10 record (.761), including three consensus national championships (1954, 1957, and 1968), two other non-consensus national titles (1961 and 1970), 13 Big Ten conference championships, and eight Rose Bowl appearances. His 205 wins was the most by a coach in the Big Ten Conference at the time he retired; this record was broken on September 13, 2025 by Iowa head coach Kirk Ferentz with a win over UMass. Hayes was a three-time winner of The College Football Coach of the Year Award, now known as the Paul "Bear" Bryant Award, and was "the subject of more varied and colorful anecdotal material than any other coach past or present, including fabled Knute Rockne", according to biographer Jerry Brondfield.

Hayes' basic coaching philosophy was that "nobody could win football games unless they regarded the game positively and would agree to pay the price that success demands of a team." His conservative style of football (especially on offense) was often described as "three yards and a cloud of dust"—in other words, a "crunching, frontal assault of muscle against muscle, bone upon bone, will against will." The basic, bread-and-butter play in Hayes' playbook was a fullback off-guard run or a tailback off tackle play. Hayes was often quoted as saying "only three things can happen when you pass (a completion, an incompletion, and an interception) and two of them are bad."

In spite of this apparent willingness to avoid change, Hayes became one of the first major college head coaches to recruit African-American players, including Jim Parker, who played both offensive and defensive tackle on Hayes' first national championship team in 1954. While Hayes was not the first to recruit African-Americans to Ohio State, he was the first to recruit and start African-Americans in large numbers there and to hire African-American assistant coaches.

Another Hayes recruit, Archie Griffin, was the only two-time Heisman Trophy winner in seven decades of selections. Altogether, Hayes had 58 players earn All-America honors under his tutelage. Many notable football coaches, such as Lou Holtz, Bill Arnsparger, Bill Mallory, Bo Schembechler, Doyt Perry, Ara Parseghian and Woody's successor, Earle Bruce, served as his assistants at various times.

Hayes often used illustrations from historical events to make a point in his coaching and teaching. When Hayes was first hired to be the head coach at Ohio State, he was also made a "full professor of physical education", having earned an M.A. degree in educational administration from Ohio State in 1948. The classes he taught were usually full, and he was called "Professor Hayes" by students. Hayes also taught mandatory English and vocabulary classes to his freshman football players. One of his students was a basketball player named Bobby Knight, who later became a legendary basketball coach.

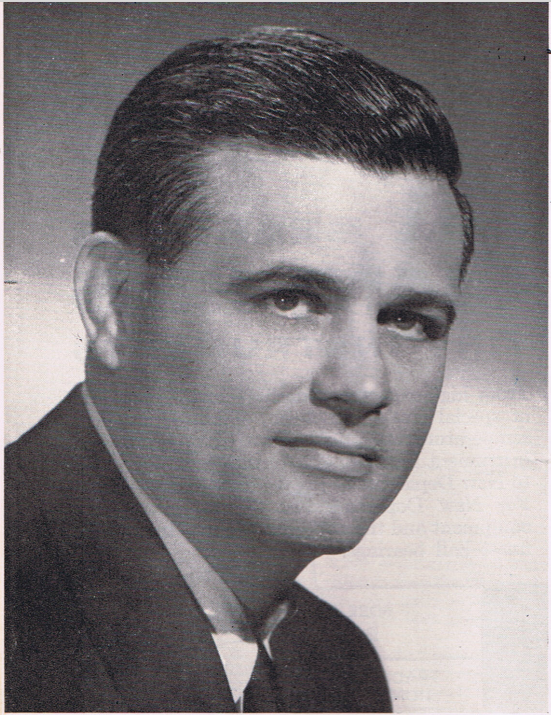
Hayes, c. 1958

During his time at Ohio State, Hayes' relationships with students and faculty members were particularly good. Even those members of the faculty who believed that the role of intercollegiate athletics was growing out of control respected Hayes personally for his commitment to academics, the standards of integrity with which he ran his program, and the genuine enthusiasm he brought to his hobby as an amateur historian. Hayes often ate lunch or dinner at the university's faculty club, interacting with faculty and administrators. As a coach and an educator, Hayes was one of the first to use the motion picture as a teaching and learning tool. He was also memorable in that he could often be seen walking across campus, taking the time to visit with students. When talking to young people, Hayes treated all with respect, without regard to race or socio-economic class. This behavior was helpful to Ohio State in quelling the violence and damage from anti-war demonstrations that other college campuses suffered in the late 1960s and early 1970s. He took the time to communicate with student leaders. Then-team quarterback Rex Kern said, "Woody was out there on the Oval with the protesters, and he'd grab a bullhorn and tell the students to express their beliefs but not be destructive. He believed in Nixon, and he believed in the Establishment, but he wasn't afraid to talk to the students. He wanted to stay close to the action." Hayes was considered one of the few authority figures that students then had respect for. His enthusiasm for coaching and winning was such that many across the nation consider the following maxim to be true: "What Vince Lombardi was to professional football, Woody Hayes was to college football."

During his tenure at Ohio State, Hayes joked that he considered himself to be Notre Dame's best recruiter because if he could not convince a recruit to come to Ohio State instead of Michigan he would try to steer the recruit to Notre Dame, whom Ohio State did not play. While Hayes' public stance was that he refused to play Notre Dame because he was afraid of polarizing the Catholic population in Ohio, Notre Dame's long-time athletic director Edward "Moose" Krause said that Hayes had told him that Hayes liked having Michigan as the only tough game on the Ohio State schedule and that having the Buckeyes play Notre Dame would detract from that. Despite Hayes' apparent fear of playing more than one "tough" game a year, Ohio State still managed to schedule regular-season games with Nebraska, Washington, Southern California, UCLA, and Oklahoma during his tenure.

After losses or ties, Hayes conducted locker room interviews while completely naked. A journalist from his tenure noted, "He was an ugly guy so it would clear the locker room out pretty fast."

== Controversies ==
In 1959, following a 17−0 loss to USC, Hayes threw a punch at Los Angeles Examiner sportswriter Al Bine, who had asked Hayes why he lost, but missed, and punched the brother of Pasadena Independent sports editor Bob Shafer in the back instead. In a May 1965 meeting of Big Ten Conference athletic directors and coaches, Hayes nearly started a fight with Iowa's athletic director, Forest Evashevski, before being restrained.

Prior to the 1973 Rose Bowl, Hayes shoved a camera into the face of a news photographer. As a result, Hayes was suspended for three games, fined $2,000, and left California with a subpoena.

In 1977, a late fumble at Michigan caused Hayes to charge at ABC cameraman Mike Freedman, who recorded his frustration while laughing at him. Hayes was ejected, put on probation by the Big Ten Conference, and fined $2,000.

=== 1962 Rose Bowl vote ===
In the 1961 season, Ohio State won the Big Ten championship, qualifying automatically for the Rose Bowl. At the time, the Big Ten Conference rules stated that the school's Faculty Council must officially approve of the trip. In this unusual development, the Ohio State Faculty Council voted 28 to 25 against the 1962 Rose Bowl trip, prompted by the head of a university alumni group, on the grounds that the school's academic reputation was suffering because of over-emphasis on the football team. Other reports stated that the bid was declined because Ohio State had already beaten their would-be Rose Bowl opponent, UCLA, during the regular season. The decision sparked minor rioting on the Ohio State campus and in the Columbus area. The Columbus Dispatch published the names, addresses, and phone numbers of those Faculty Council Members who voted against the trip as well as the amount of university money that they spent on the trips. While Hayes was diplomatic with some faculty members who voted against the trip and urged the students to cease complaining, he did not spare his criticism of the alumni club president who led the charge against accepting the bowl bid. Hayes confronted the alumni president, launched a profanity-laced tirade against him, punched him in the stomach and knocked the wind out of him.

=== Comments on the My Lai Massacre ===
Speaking at a football banquet in 1969, Hayes spoke about the recently revealed My Lai Massacre. He stated that the Vietnamese men in My Lai deserved to die, "and I wouldn't be so sure those women were innocent. The children are obviously innocent – if they are less than five."

=== Confrontation with Jerry Markbreit ===
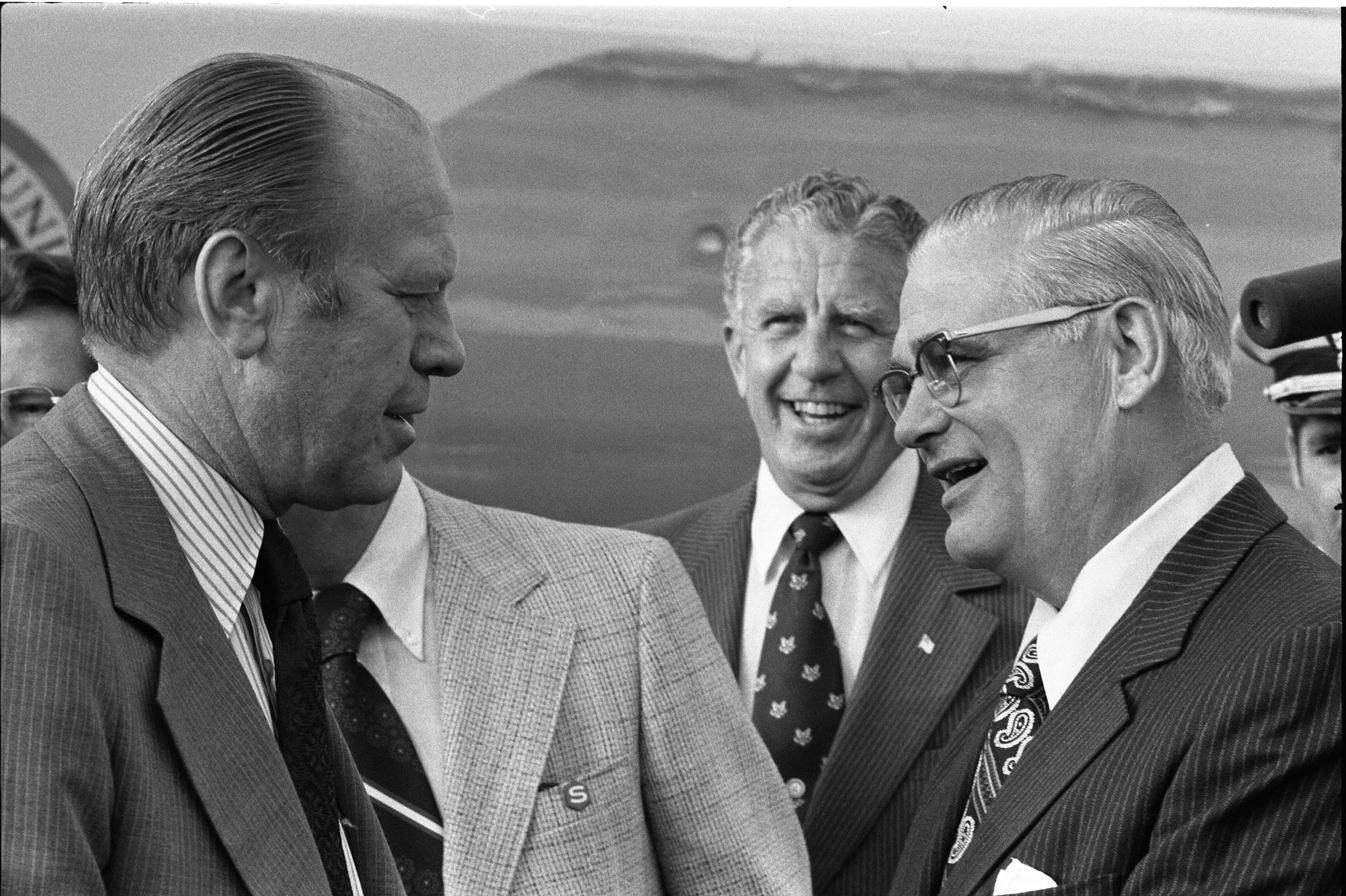
Hayes with President Gerald Ford in 1974

Late in the 1971 rivalry game against Michigan in Ann Arbor, furious over what he thought was a missed defensive pass interference foul by Thom Darden of Michigan, Hayes stormed onto the field, launched a profanity-laced tirade at referee Jerry Markbreit, and tore up the sideline markers, receiving a 15-yard unsportsmanlike conduct penalty. Hayes then threw the penalty flag into the crowd, a kicking tee at Markbreit, began destroying the yard markers, and threw the first-down marker into the ground like a javelin before being restrained by Buckeyes team officials; Hayes was then assessed an additional 15-yard penalty and ejected. Hayes was suspended for one game and fined $1,000 (equivalent to $8,000 in 2025).

=== 1978 Gator Bowl incident and dismissal ===
On December 29, 1978, the Buckeyes played in the Gator Bowl against Clemson. Late in the fourth quarter, Clemson was leading Ohio State 17–15. Freshman quarterback Art Schlichter managed to get Ohio State into field goal range. On third and 5 at the Clemson 24-yard line with 2:30 left and the clock running, Hayes called a pass rather than a run, because Schlichter was having a great game up to that point. Schlichter's next pass was intercepted by Clemson nose guard Charlie Bauman, who returned it toward the Ohio State sideline, where he was run out of bounds. After Bauman stood up facing the OSU sideline, Hayes punched him in the throat — triggering a bench-clearing brawl. Hayes stormed onto the field and in a profanity-laced tirade was abusive towards the referee. When one of Hayes' own players, offensive lineman Ken Fritz, tried to intervene, Hayes turned on him and had to be restrained by defensive coordinator George Hill. The Buckeyes were assessed two 15-yard unsportsmanlike conduct penalties for Hayes' attack on Bauman and his abuse towards the referee. Bauman was not injured by Hayes' punch and shrugged the incident off. Even though the game was being telecast by ABC, neither announcer Keith Jackson nor co-announcer Ara Parseghian saw or commented about the punch.

After the game, Ohio State Athletic Director Hugh Hindman, who had played for Hayes at Miami University and had been an assistant under him for seven years, privately confronted Hayes in the Buckeye locker room. He said that he intended to tell school president Harold Enarson about what happened, and strongly implied that Hayes had coached his last game at Ohio State. After a heated and profanity-laced exchange, Hindman said that he then offered Hayes a chance to resign, but Hayes refused, saying, "That would make it too easy for you. You had better go ahead and fire me." Hindman then met with Enarson at a country club near Jacksonville, and the two agreed that Hayes had to go.

The next morning, after a brief but heated meeting in which profanities were exchanged, Hindman told Hayes that he had been fired. A press conference was held at the hotel where the team had been staying. The team returned to Columbus around noon, and Hayes left the airport in a state police car. Regarding Hayes' dismissal, Enarson said that "there isn't a university or athletic conference in this country that would permit a coach to physically assault a college athlete." After the incident, Hayes reflected on his career by saying, "Nobody despises to lose more than I do. That's got me into trouble over the years, but it also made a man of mediocre ability into a pretty good coach." About two months after the incident, Hayes called Bauman in his dorm room, but did not apologize for his previous attack on him. Earle Bruce succeeded Hayes as Ohio State's head coach.

Many years later, Leonard Downie, Jr., former executive editor of The Washington Post and student journalist at Ohio State, said he regretted not reporting an incident in the 1960s where Hayes instructed a player to take off his helmet and then hit him in the head. “I could have prevented so much trauma for so many” he said. “For that I am truly regretful.”

According to the 1994 HBO documentary American Coaches: Men of Vision and Victory, Hindman had placed Hayes on notice at the beginning of the 1978 season, not just for the swing at the ABC cameraman during the 1977 Michigan game, but also for hitting a player during practice. In his 1989 autobiography, Michigan's Bo Schembechler wrote that he believed Hayes, who was diabetic and may have had a high blood sugar level, didn't believe he struck Bauman. Schembechler also noted that Hayes contended he was merely trying to grab the ball away.

== Final days and death ==
On March 11, 1987, Hayes was clearly in failing health when he had someone drive him in his pickup truck to Dayton to introduce Bo Schembechler, who was speaking at a banquet. Organizers had tried to discourage Hayes from attending, but Hayes insisted. He gave a lengthy introduction to Schembechler and then stayed to hear him speak before being driven back home.

The next morning, March 12, Hayes's wife Anne found him unconscious in his bed at the couple's home. He died of a heart attack at age 74. He is interred at Union Cemetery in Columbus, Ohio.

== Legacy ==
Hayes's lifetime record of 238–72–10 places him 16th in all-time NCAA Division I FBS coaching victories. He was inducted into the College Football Hall of Fame in 1983.

At Hayes's funeral at First Community Church in Marble Cliff, Ohio on March 17, 1987, former president Richard Nixon delivered the eulogy before a crowd of 1,400, acknowledging the friendship that had begun between the two during his second term as vice president. Having met Hayes at a reception following a Buckeye win over Iowa in 1957, Nixon recalled, "I wanted to talk about football. Woody wanted to talk about foreign policy. And you know Woody—we talked about foreign policy." The following day, more than 15,000 people took part in a memorial service at Ohio Stadium.

Following his death and in keeping with his wishes, the Wayne Woodrow Hayes Chair in National Security Studies was established at Ohio State's Mershon Center for International Security Studies. Professor John Mueller currently holds the chair. In November 1987, the university dedicated the new Woody Hayes Athletic Center in his memory.

In an episode of the sitcom WKRP in Cincinnati (season 1, episode 4, "Hoodlum Rock"), released the year of Hayes' football retirement, Andy Travis pranks Les Nessman by telling him that Woody Hayes has disappeared into the "Cincinnati Triangle". Unlike other sports icons referenced in the series, Hayes did not make a direct appearance.

== Personal life ==
Hayes married the former Anne Gross in 1942. Anne was a formidable and popular woman in her own right, who used to jokingly say at numerous sports banquets, "Divorce Woody? Never! But there were plenty of times I wanted to murder him!" The couple had one son, Steven, who went on to become a lawyer and judge. Coincidentally, the younger Hayes was assigned to the 2003 trial of former Ohio State standout Maurice Clarett. Judge Hayes (he had been on the Franklin County, Ohio Municipal Court) died in May 2022, at 76; his death was announced May 30.

=== World War II movie host ===
Because of his knowledge of military history and ongoing popularity, Hayes in the early 1980s hosted the broadcast of six World War II films for WBNS-TV in Columbus, which has served as the official outlet of Ohio State sports media programming for years, including the football coach's shows. Among the movies broadcast were Patton, Midway, The Wackiest Ship in the Army, The Desert Fox: The Story of Rommel, and Tora! Tora! Tora!.

Hayes also gave critical historical perspectives related to each movie. Hayes' segments, depending upon the movie, were taped in such locations as Fort Knox, West Point, the USS Yorktown, and Stuttgart, Germany, where he interviewed Manfred Rommel, Lord Mayor of Stuttgart and the son of Erwin Rommel.

== Head coaching record ==
Year	Team	Overall	Conference	Standing	Bowl/playoffs	Coaches^{#}	AP^{°}
Denison Big Red (Ohio Athletic Conference) (1946–1948)
1946	Denison	2–6	2–4	15th			
1947	Denison	9–0	6–0	1st			
1948	Denison	8–0	6–0	2nd			
Denison:		19–6	14–4				
Miami Redskins (Mid-American Conference) (1949–1950)
1949	Miami	5–4	3–1	2nd			
1950	Miami	9–1	4–0	1st	W Salad		
Miami:		14–5	7–1				
Ohio State Buckeyes (Big Ten Conference) (1951–1978)
1951	Ohio State	4–3–2	2–3–2	5th			
1952	Ohio State	6–3	5–2	3rd		15	17
1953	Ohio State	6–3	4–3	4th		20	
1954	Ohio State	10–0	7–0	1st	W Rose	2	1
1955	Ohio State	7–2	6–0	1st		5	5
1956	Ohio State	6–3	4–2	T–4th			15
1957	Ohio State	9–1	7–0	1st	W Rose	1	2
1958	Ohio State	6–1–2	4–1–2	3rd		7	8
1959	Ohio State	3–5–1	2–4–1	T–8th			
1960	Ohio State	7–2	5–2	3rd		8	8
1961	Ohio State	8–0–1	6–0	1st		2	2
1962	Ohio State	6–3	4–2	T–3rd		13	
1963	Ohio State	5–3–1	4–1–1	T–2nd			
1964	Ohio State	7–2	5–1	2nd		9	9
1965	Ohio State	7–2	6–1	2nd		11	
1966	Ohio State	4–5	3–4	6th			
1967	Ohio State	6–3	5–2	4th			
1968	Ohio State	10–0	7–0	1st	W Rose	1	1
1969	Ohio State	8–1	6–1	T–1st		5	4
1970	Ohio State	9–1	7–0	1st	L Rose	2	5
1971	Ohio State	6–4	5–3	T–3rd			
1972	Ohio State	9–2	7–1	T–1st	L Rose	3	9
1973	Ohio State	10–0–1	7–0–1	T–1st	W Rose	3	2
1974	Ohio State	10–2	7–1	T–1st	L Rose	3	4
1975	Ohio State	11–1	8–0	1st	L Rose	4	4
1976	Ohio State	9–2–1	7–1	T–1st	W Orange	5	6
1977	Ohio State	9–3	7–1	T–1st	L Sugar	12	11
1978	Ohio State	7–4–1	6–2	4th	L Gator		
Ohio State:		205–61–10	152–37–7				
Total:		238–72–10					
National championship Conference title Conference division title or championship game berth
^{#}Rankings from final Coaches Poll.; ^{°}Rankings from final AP Poll.

== Coaching tree ==
Former assistants who became NCAA Division I FBS or NFL head coaches:

- Joe Bugel, Arizona Cardinals, Oakland Raiders
- George Chaump, Navy
- Lou Holtz, William and Mary, North Carolina State, New York Jets, Arkansas, Minnesota, Notre Dame, South Carolina
- Bill Mallory, Miami (OH), Colorado, Indiana
- Dave McClain, Wisconsin
- Doyt Perry, Bowling Green
- Ralph Staub, Cincinnati

Former players who became assistants who became NCAA Division I FBS or NFL head coaches:

- Bill Arnsparger, LSU, New York Giants
- Earle Bruce, Iowa State, Ohio State, Colorado State
- Glen Mason, Kansas, Minnesota
- Ara Parseghian, Miami (OH), Northwestern, Notre Dame
- Bo Schembechler, Miami (OH), Michigan
- Clive Rush, Toledo, Boston Patriots
- Fred Bruney, Philadelphia Eagles
- Dick LeBeau, Cincinnati Bengals (Professional Football Hall of Fame as a player)
- John McVay, New York Giants (later General Manager of San Francisco 49ers)
- Gary Moeller, Illinois, Michigan, Detroit Lions
- John Pont, Miami (OH), Indiana, Northwestern
- Bo Rein, North Carolina State (named coach at LSU, but died in a plane crash before coaching a game for the Tigers)

== See also ==
- History of Ohio State Buckeyes football
- List of college football career coaching wins leaders
- List of presidents of the American Football Coaches Association
