= 1978 Gator Bowl =

American college football game

Ohio State Buckeyes	Clemson Tigers
(7–3–1)	(10–1)
Big Ten	ACC
15	17
Head coach: Woody Hayes	Head coach: Danny Ford
AP / Coaches; 20 / NR	AP / Coaches; 7 / 8
	1	2	3	4	Total
Ohio State	0	9	0	6	15
Clemson	0	10	7	0	17
- Date: December 29, 1978
- Season: 1978
- Stadium: Gator Bowl Stadium
- Location: Jacksonville, Florida
- MVP: Steve Fuller (QB, Clemson) & Art Schlichter (QB, Ohio State)
- Referee: James M. Artley (SEC)
- Attendance: 72,011

United States TV coverage
- Network: ABC
- Announcers: Keith Jackson, Ara Parseghian

The 1978 Gator Bowl was a college football bowl game played between the Ohio State Buckeyes and Clemson Tigers on December 29, 1978. Clemson won the contest, 17–15. The game is most remembered for an incident in which longtime Ohio State head coach Woody Hayes punched a Clemson player after a play late in the fourth quarter with two minutes remaining, leading to Hayes being fired the next day.

== Woody Hayes incident ==
With just over two minutes left in the game, Ohio State had the ball on the Clemson 24, trailing 17–15. Ohio State quarterback Art Schlichter threw a short pass that was intercepted by Clemson nose guard Charlie Bauman. Bauman avoided several tackles and was finally shoved out of bounds on the Ohio State sideline. After Bauman got up, Ohio State coach Woody Hayes grabbed his jersey, punched him in the throat, and had to be restrained from hitting him again. Bauman was unaffected by Hayes' attack, but the incident sparked a brief but intense bench-clearing fight between players of both teams.

Ohio State was penalized for unsportsmanlike conduct, but the referee could not explain the penalty to the crowd in the stadium or the television audience because they did not have microphones at the time, and ABC Sports television announcer Keith Jackson had not seen the punch right away. Hayes stormed onto the field and pulled on an official's shirt a few plays later, drawing another penalty for his team. Meanwhile, Clemson was able to run out the clock and preserve the 17–15 victory.

After it became clear that Hayes had punched an opposing player, Ohio State director Hugh Hindman (who had played for Hayes at the University of Miami Ohio and was an assistant coach at Ohio State) fired Hayes the next morning, ending his 28-season tenure as the Buckeyes head coach.

== Future rematches ==
Ohio State and Clemson would meet again in the 2014 Orange Bowl, the semifinal for the College Football Playoff in the 2016 Fiesta Bowl, and the 2019 Fiesta Bowl, with Clemson winning each time. Ohio State and Clemson met once again in the semifinal for the College Football Playoff in the 2021 Sugar Bowl, won by Ohio State, 49–28.
