= 1976 Big Ten Conference football season =

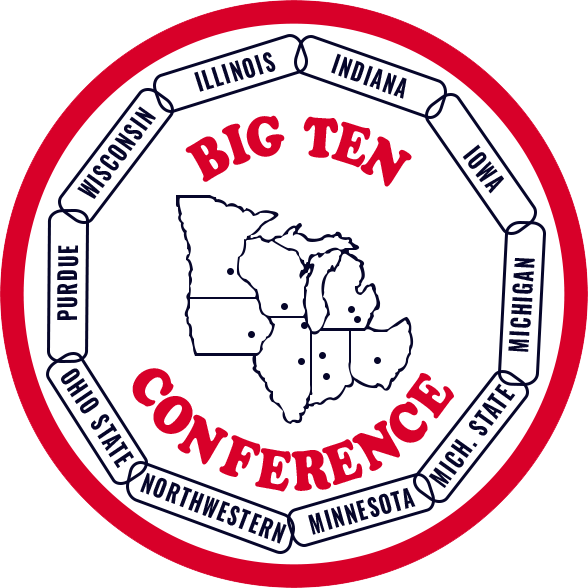
- Sport: American football
- Teams: 10
- Top draft pick: Mike Cobb
- Co-champions: Michigan, Ohio State
- Season MVP: Rob Lytle

Seasons
- 1975 1977

1976 Big Ten Conference football standings
	Conf.					Overall
Team	W		L		T	W		L		T
No. 3 Michigan +	7	–	1	–	0	10	–	2	–	0
No. 6 Ohio State +	7	–	1	–	0	9	–	2	–	1
Minnesota	4	–	4	–	0	6	–	5	–	0
Illinois	4	–	4	–	0	5	–	6	–	0
Indiana	4	–	4	–	0	5	–	6	–	0
Purdue	4	–	4	–	0	5	–	6	–	0
Iowa	3	–	5	–	0	5	–	6	–	0
Wisconsin	3	–	5	–	0	5	–	6	–	0
Michigan State	3	–	5	–	0	4	–	6	–	1
Northwestern	1	–	7	–	0	1	–	10	–	0
+ – Conference co-champions; Rankings from AP Poll

The 1976 Big Ten Conference football season was the 81st season of college football played by the member schools of the Big Ten Conference and was a part of the 1976 NCAA Division I football season.

The 1976 Michigan Wolverines football team, under head coach Bo Schembechler, finished the season with a 10–2 record, tied for the Big Ten championship, led the country in both scoring offense (38.7 points per game in regular season) and scoring defense (7.2 points allowed per game in regular system), lost to USC in the 1977 Rose Bowl, and was ranked No. 3 in the final AP and UPI Polls. Running back Rob Lytle rushed for 1,469 yards, finished third in the voting for the Heisman Trophy, and won the Chicago Tribune Silver Football as the Big Ten's most valuable player. Lytle and offensive guard Mark Donahue were both selected as consensus first-team All-Americans. Linebacker Calvin O'Neal and receiver Jim Smith also received first-team All-American honors from multiple selectors.

The 1976 Ohio State Buckeyes football team, under head coach Woody Hayes, compiled a 9–2–1 record, won the 1977 Orange Bowl against Colorado, and was ranked No. 6 in the final AP Poll. Defensive end Bob Brudzinski and offensive tackle Chris Ward were recognized as consensus first-team All-Americans. Punter Tom Skladany also received first-team All-American honors from multiple selectors. Running back Jeff Logan ranked second in the conference with 1,248 rushing yards.

The conference's statistical leaders included Ed Smith and Kirk Gibson of Michigan State with 1,749 passing yards and 748 receiving yards, respectively, Rob Lytle of Michigan with 1,469 rushing yards, Mike Carroll of Wisconsin with 1,773 yards of total offense, and Pete Johnson of Ohio State with 114 points scored.

== Season overview ==
=== Results and team statistics ===
Conf. Rank	Team	Head coach	AP final	AP high	Overall record	Conf. record	PPG	PAG	MVP
1 (tie)	Michigan	Bo Schembechler	#3	#1	10–2	7–1	**36.0**	**7.9**	**Rob Lytle**
1 (tie)	Ohio State	Woody Hayes	#6	#2	9–2–1	7–1	25.4	12.4	Bob Brudzinski
3 (tie)	Minnesota	Cal Stoll	NR	NR	6–5	4–4	18.3	19.2	Tony Dungy
3 (tie)	Illinois	Bob Blackman	NR	#14	5–6	4–4	21.4	22.5	Scott Studwell
3 (tie)	Indiana	Lee Corso	NR	NR	5–6	4–4	11.8	23.1	Steve Sanders
3 (tie)	Purdue	Alex Agase	NR	NR	5–6	3–5	17.1	21.2	Scott Dierking
7 (tie)	Iowa	Bob Commings	NR	NR	5–6	3–5	14.6	21.3	Butch Caldwell; Tom Grine
7 (tie)	Wisconsin	John Jardine	NR	NR	5–6	3–5	27.1	24.2	Mike Carroll
7 (tie)	Michigan State	Darryl Rogers	NR	NR	4–6–1	3–5	21.5	25.3	Rich Baes
10	Northwestern	John Pont	NR	NR	1–10	1–7	12.2	28.3	Randy Dean

Key
AP final = Team's rank in the final AP Poll of the 1976 season
AP high = Team's highest rank in the AP Poll throughout the 1976 season
PPG = Average of points scored per game; conference leader's average displayed in bold
PAG = Average of points allowed per game; conference leader's average displayed in bold
MVP = Most valuable player as voted by players on each team as part of the voting process to determine the winner of the Chicago Tribune Silver Football trophy; trophy winner in bold

=== Regular season ===
==== September 11 ====
On September 11, 1976, the Big Ten football teams opened the season with five conference games.

- Michigan 40, Wisconsin 27. Michigan defeated Wisconsin, 40–27, before a crowd of 101,347 at Michigan Stadium in Ann Arbor, Michigan. Michigan scored two points on a safety on the second play from scrimmage as Wisconsin running back Mike Morgan fumbled the handoff on a reverse play and the ball rolled out of the end zone. Harlan Huckleby then extended the lead to 9–0 with a 56-yard touchdown run on Michigan's third play from scrimmage. Michigan's offense was led by Harlan Huckleby who rushed for 131 yards and three touchdowns on 19 carries. Rick Leach completed six of eight passes for 105 yards and two touchdowns. Leach also rushed for 84 yards on nine carries. Wing back Jim Smith scored two touchdowns and netted 174 yards in the game, including gains on kickoff and punt returns, receptions, and reverse plays. Wisconsin's 27 points was the most allowed by a Michigan team since 1969, and Wisconsin's 426 yards of offense was the most allowed by Michigan since before Bo Schembechler took over as head coach. After the game, Schembechler told the press: "Twenty seven points that's what we usually give up in the first half of the season. I wasn't happy with the movement, I wasn't happy with the pursuit, I wasn't happy with the tackling, I wasn't happy with the playing of the ball in the secondary and I wasn't happy with the heat we put on the passer."
- Ohio State 49, Michigan State 21. Ohio State defeated Michigan State, 49–21, before a crowd of 86,509 at Ohio Stadium in Columbus, Ohio. Ohio State led, 42–0, before Michigan State scored a point.
- Minnesota 32, Indiana 13. Minnesota defeated Indiana, 32–13, before a crowd of 39,004 at Memorial Stadium in Minneapolis.
- Illinois 24, Iowa 6. Illinois defeated Iowa, 24–6, before a crowd of 49,515 at Memorial Stadium in Champaign, Illinois.
- Purdue 31, Northwestern 19. Purdue defeated Northwestern, 31–19, before a crowd of 46,311 at Ross–Ade Stadium in West Lafayette, Indiana. Scott Dierking rushed for 151 yards and scored two touchdowns.

==== September 18 ====
On September 18, 1976, the Big Ten teams played 10 non-conference games, resulting in seven wins and three losses.

- Michigan 51, Stanford 0. After a tie with Stanford in 1975, Michigan defeated Stanford, 51–0, before a crowd of 103,741 at Michigan Stadium. Three Michigan running backs rushed for at least 100 yards: Harlan Huckleby (160); Russell Davis (115, including an 85-yard touchdown run in the fourth quarter); and Rob Lytle (101). In total, the Wolverines gained 531 rushing yards against Stanford. On defense, Michigan intercepted three Stanford passes. Calvin O'Neal led the team with 11 total tackles. The game marked the first time a Stanford team had been shut out since 1967.

On the Wednesday before the Stanford game, the Michigan team received a visit from President Gerald Ford. Ford, who was the most valuable player of the 1934 Michigan Wolverines football team, spent time with team during a practice session and later ate with the team. Ford noted, "They're an awful lot bigger today. Not only are they bigger but they're better." Later that day, Ford formally opened his reelection campaign with a speech to a boisterous crowd of 14,000 at Crisler Arena.

- Ohio State 12, Penn State 7.
- Minnesota 28, Washington State 14.
- Illinois 31, Missouri 6.
- Nebraska 45, Indiana 13.
- Notre Dame 23, Purdue 7.
- Iowa 41, Syracuse 3.
- Wisconsin 45, North Dakota 9.
- Michigan State 21, Wyoming 10.
- North Carolina 12, Northwestern 0.

==== September 25 ====
On September 25, 1976, the Big Ten teams played 10 non-conference games, resulting in five wins, four losses, and one tie.

- Michigan 70, Navy 14. Michigan defeated Navy, 70–14, before a crowd of 101,040 at Michigan Stadium. The game marked the worst defeat in the history of the Naval Academy's football program. The point total was also the highest by a Michigan team since an 85–0 win over the University of Chicago in 1939. Quarterback Rick Leach completed 8 of 12 passes for 179 yards and led the scoring with two rushing touchdowns and two passing touchdowns. A total of nine players scored for the Wolverines. Middle linebacker Calvin O'Neal scored a touchdown on a 29-yard return after intercepting a Navy pass. Jim Smith caught four passes for 147 yards and added another 55 yards on kickoff and punt returns. After the game, Bo Schembechler denied running up the score, having used 53 players in the game.
- Missouri 22, Ohio State 21.
- Minnesota 21, Western Michigan 10.
- Baylor 34, Illinois 19.
- Indiana 20, Washington 13.
- USC 31, Purdue 13.
- Iowa 7, Penn State 6.
- Wisconsin 35, Washington State 26.
- Michigan State 31, NC State 31.
- Notre Dame 48, Northwestern 0.

==== October 2 ====
On October 2, 1976, the Big Ten teams played 10 non-conference games, resulting in three wins and seven losses. After three weeks of non-conference play, the Big Ten teams had compiled a 15–14–1 record against non-conference opponents.

- Michigan 31, Wake Forest 0. Michigan defeated Wake Forest, 31–0, before a crowd of 103,241 at Michigan Stadium. Rob Lytle rushed for 110 yards and two touchdowns on 14 carries and also caught two passes for 21 yards. With the total, Lytle moved past Tom Harmon for fourth place on Michigan's all-time career rushing list. Harlan Huckleby added 89 yards, and quarterback Rick Leach completed only three of 14 passes and threw three interceptions.
- Ohio State 10, UCLA 10.
- Washington 38, Minnesota 7.
- Texas A&M 14, Illinois 7.
- NC State 24, Indiana 21.
- Purdue 42, Miami (OH) 20.
- USC 55, Iowa 0.
- Kansas 34, Wisconsin 24.
- Notre Dame 24, Michigan State 6.
- Arizona 27, Northwestern 15.

==== October 9 ====
On October 9, 1976, the Big Ten teams played five conference games.

- Michigan 42, Michigan State 10. In the annual battle for the Paul Bunyan Trophy, Michigan (ranked No. 1 in the AP Poll) defeated Michigan State, 42–10, before a crowd of 104,211 at Michigan Stadium. Michigan's 42 points was the most it had scored against Michigan State since 1947. Fullback Rob Lytle rushed for 180 yards on 10 carries, including a 45-yard gain on a fake punt and a 75-yard touchdown run in the first quarter. Harlan Huckleby rushed for 126 yards and three touchdowns on 23 carries. In all, the Wolverines rushed for 442 yards on 62 carries against the Spartans. Wolfman Jerry Zuver scored Michigan's final touchdown on a 60-yard interception return in the fourth quarter. In the AP Poll released on the Monday after the game, Michigan retained its No. 1 ranking with 57 out of 60 first-place votes and 1,194 points out of a possible 1,200 points.
- Ohio State 34, Iowa 14.
- Minnesota 29, Illinois 14.
- Indiana 7, Northwestern 0.
- Purdue 18, Wisconsin 16.

==== October 16 ====
On October 16, 1976, the Big Ten teams played five conference games.

- Michigan 38, Northwestern 7. Michigan defeated Northwestern, 38–7, before a crowd of 31,045 at Dyche Stadium in Evanston, Illinois. The Wolverines scored 28 points in the second quarter, compiled 346 yard of total offense in the first half, and led 31–0 at halftime. Rob Lytle, who moved from fullback to tailback in the game, rushed for 172 yards and two touchdowns on 18 carries. Michigan remained ranked No. 1 in both polls after its victory over Northwestern. It captured 40 out of 42 first place votes from the UPI Board of Coaches.
- Ohio State 30, Wisconsin 20.
- Minnesota 14, Michigan State 10.
- Illinois 21, Purdue 17.
- Indiana 14, Iowa 7.

==== October 23 ====
On October 23, 1976, the Big Ten teams played five conference games.

- Michigan 35, Indiana 0. Michigan defeated Indiana, 35–0, before a crowd of 39,385 in cold, wet conditions at Memorial Stadium in Bloomington, Indiana. Rob Lytle rushed for 175 yards on 25 carries and scored touchdowns on runs of 14 yards and one yard.
- Ohio State 24, Purdue 3.
- Iowa 22, Minnesota 12.
- Michigan State 31, Illinois 23.
- Wisconsin 28, Northwestern 25.

==== October 30 ====
On October 30, 1976, the Big Ten teams played five conference games.

- Michigan 45, Minnesota 0. In the annual battle for the Little Brown Jug, Michigan defeated Minnesota, 45–0, in steady rain and cold conditions before a homecoming crowd of 104,426 at Michigan Stadium. Quarterback Rick Leach accounted for four touchdowns, two rushing and two passing. He rushed for a career-high 114 yards on 10 carries, including a 28-yard touchdown run in the second quarter and a six-yard touchdown run in the third quarter. Leach also completed all four of his passes for 40 passing yards, including a 13-yard touchdown pass to Rob Lytle in the second quarter and a 22-yard touchdown pass to Jim Smith in the third quarter. Lytle rushed for 129 rushing yards (107 in the first half), including a two-yard touchdown run in the fourth quarter. In the Toledo Blade, John Hannen wrote after the game that "Leach handles the option with the light fingers of a pick pocket" and opined that Michigan's combination of Lytle, Huckleby, Smith and Davis "may be the fastest backfield in collegiate history."
- Ohio State 47, Indiana 7.
- Illinois 31, Wisconsin 25.
- Michigan State 45, Purdue 13.
- Iowa 13, Northwestern 10.

==== November 6 ====
On November 6, 1976, the Big Ten teams played five conference games.

- Purdue 16, Michigan 14. Purdue, which had not beaten Michigan since 1964, upset the No. 1 ranked Wolverines, 16–14, before a crowd of 57,205 at Ross–Ade Stadium in West Lafayette, Indiana. It was the first time Michigan had lost to a Big Ten Conference team other than Ohio State since 1969. Michigan took a 7–0 lead in the first quarter on an eight-yard touchdown run by Rick Leach. Purdue's Scott Dierking rushed for 162 yards, including touchdowns in the first and second quarters. Early in the third quarter, Michigan drove to Purdue's one-yard line, but Leach fumbled and the ball was turned over to Purdue. Later in the third quarter, Leach threw a 64-yard touchdown pass to Jim Smith, and Bob Wood kicked the extra point to give Michigan a 14–13 lead. Purdue's Rock Supan kicked a field goal on fourth down with four minutes remaining in the game. With nine second left in the game, Bob Wood's attempt at a 37-yard field goal went wide to the left. The UPI dubbed Purdue the "Spoilermakers", noting that Purdue had also upset a No. 1 ranked Notre Dame team in 1974. After the game, Bo Schembechler told reporters, "It hurts a lot. We don't accept it. . . . We shouldn't accept it . . . because we should have won. No defeat is good. We got down there at the end and we should have scored. But when you depend on winning on a forward pass or a field goal, you're in trouble."

Four days before the game, Gerald Ford, who played center for Michigan in the 1930s, lost 1976 presidential election to Jimmy Carter. After losing a close election, Ford harkened back to his days as a football player, "We lost, in the last quarter."

- Ohio State 42, Illinois 10.
- Minnesota 38, Northwestern 10.
- Michigan State 23, Indiana 0.
- Wisconsin 38, Iowa 21.

==== November 13 ====
On November 13, 1976, the Big Ten teams played five conference games.

- Michigan 38, Illinois 7. Michigan defeated Illinois, 38–7, before a crowd of 104,107 at Michigan Stadium. Rob Lytle rushed for 89 yards on 21 carries and scored three touchdowns. With his rushing yards against Illinois, Lytle became Michigan's all-time career rushing leader. Rick Leach rushed for 65 yards and completed 9 of 15 passes for 151 yards and two touchdowns. With Illinois putting seven or eight men on the line at times, Michigan opened up the passing attack. Bo Schembechler said after the game, "When they put that many people on the line of scrimmage, you have to throw the ball over their heads." In addition to the touchdown pass to Lytle, Leach connected with tight end Mark Shmerge in the second quarter for a seven-yard touchdown pass. Jim Smith also caught six passes for 127 yards. Leach's two touchdown passes gave him 13 for the season, tying the Michigan record set in 1947 by Bob Chappuis. Michigan concluded its home schedule with an average of 103,159 spectators per game, setting a new record for college football attendance.
- Ohio State 9, Minnesota 3.
- Indiana 15, Wisconsin 14.
- Purdue 21, Iowa 0.
- Northwestern 42, Michigan State 21.

==== November 20 ====
On November 20, 1976, the Big Ten teams played five conference games.

- Michigan 22, Ohio State 0. Michigan (ranked No. 4 in the AP Poll) defeated Ohio State (ranked No. 8), 22–0, before a record crowd of 88,250 at Ohio Stadium in Columbus, Ohio. The game was the worst home loss for Ohio State since 1967, and it snapped Ohio State's streak of 12 years without being shut out. After a scoreless first half, Russell Davis scored two touchdowns for Michigan in the third quarter. Davis rushed for 83 yards on 24 carries. After Davis's second touchdown, holder Jerry Zuver ran for a two-point conversion. Rob Lytle rushed for 165 yards on 29 carries, including a touchdown in the fourth quarter. Late in the second quarter, with the game still scoreless, Ohio State drove the ball to the Michigan 10-yard line when Jim Pickens intercepted a pass in the end zone. Michigan ended the regular season ranked first in the country in total offense (448.1 yards per game), scoring offense (38.7 points per game), and scoring defense (7.2 points per game).
- Wisconsin 26, Minnesota 17.
- Illinois 48, Northwestern 6.
- Indiana 20, Purdue 14.
- Iowa 30, Michigan State 17.

=== Bowl games ===
==== 1977 Rose Bowl ====
On January 1, 1977, USC (ranked No. 3 in the AP Poll) defeated Michigan (ranked No. 2), 14–6, before a crowd of 106,182 in the 1977 Rose Bowl in Pasadena, California.

In the first quarter, neither team scored, and USC's Heisman Trophy runner-up Ricky Bell was injured and unable to return to the game. Michigan took a 6–0 lead on a one-yard touchdown run by Rob Lytle in the second quarter, but Bob Wood's extra point kick was blocked. The Trojans moved down field on the next drive, and quarterback Vince Evans put USC in the lead on a one-yard touchdown run with a minute-and-a-half left in the first half. Neither team scored in the third quarter, and freshman tailback Charles White scored USC's second touchdown with three minutes left in the game. White rushed for 122 yards in the game. Michigan's offense was held to 155 rushing yards and 76 passing yards. Rick Leach completed only 4 of 12 passes.

Press coverage of the game focused on Michigan's conservative, run-oriented offense and USC's more versatile attack. Los Angeles Times columnist Jim Murray wrote: "Of course, it's possible Michigan doesn't know how to catch a pass. They never throw any, so may not know it's legal. The way they play the game you could hold it in a cave." An Associated Press story noted: "It was the same old story. The Big Ten's Rose Bowl representative, a stick-to-the-ground team . . . just couldn't cope with the versatility of its Pacific-8 Conference opponent." Another writer noted that the Rose Bowl had become an annual "wake" for the Big 10: "It is rapidly becoming an annual event. Only the corpses are different."

==== 1977 Orange Bowl ====
On January 1, 1977, Ohio State (ranked No. 12 in the AP Poll) defeated Colorado (ranked No. 11), 27–10, in the 1977 Orange Bowl in Miami, Florida.

== Statistical leaders ==
=== Passing yards ===
1. Ed Smith, Michigan State (1,749)
2. Mike Carroll, Wisconsin (1,627)
3. Randy Dean, Northwestern (1,384)
4. Tony Dungy, Minnesota (1,291)
5. Kurt Steger, Illinois (1,243)

=== Rushing yards ===
1. Rob Lytle, Michigan (1,469)
2. Jeff Logan, Ohio State (1,248)
3. Mike Harkrader, Indiana (1,003)
4. Scott Dierking, Purdue (1,000)
5. Larry Canada, Wisconsin (993)

=== Receiving yards ===
1. Kirk Gibson, Michigan State (748)
2. Jim Smith, Michigan (714)
3. Scott Yelvington, Northwestern (649)
4. Eugene Byrd, Michigan State (539)
5. Mark Bailey, Northwestern (496)

=== Total offense ===
1. Mike Carroll, Wisconsin (1,773)
2. Ed Smith, Michigan State (1,738)
3. Tony Dungy, Minnesota (1,639)
4. Rick Leach, Michigan (1,611)
5. Randy Dean, Northwestern (1,561)

=== Passing efficiency rating ===
1. Randy Dean, Northwestern (118.4)
2. Ed Smith, Michigan State (117.4)
3. Kurt Steger, Illinois (106.1)
4. Mike Carroll, Wisconsin (105.9)
5. Tony Dungy, Minnesota (86.2)

=== Rushing yards per attempt ===
1. Rob Lytle, Michigan (6.6)
2. Harlan Huckleby, Michigan (5.9)
3. Jeff Logan, Ohio State (5.7)
4. Russell Davis, Michigan (5.7)
5. Rick Leach, Michigan (5.6)

=== Yards per reception ===
1. Jim Smith, Michigan (27.5)
2. Kirk Gibson, Michigan State (19.2)
3. Scott Yelvington, Northwestern (19.1)
4. Eugene Byrd, Michigan State (17.4)
5. Mark Bailey, Northwestern (15.5)

=== Points scored ===
1. Pete Johnson, Ohio State (114)
2. Rob Lytle, Michigan (96)
3. Jim Perkins, Minnesota (78)
4. Bob Wood, Michigan (76)
5. Scott Dierking, Purdue (66)
5. Harlan Huckleby, Michigan (66)

== Awards and honors ==
=== All-Big Ten honors ===
The following players were picked by the Associated Press (AP) and/or the United Press International (UPI) as first-team players on the 1976 All-Big Ten Conference football team.

Offense

Position	Name	Team	Selectors
Quarterback	Rick Leach	Michigan	AP, UPI
Running back	Scott Dierking	Purdue	AP, UPI
Running back	Rob Lytle	Michigan	AP, UPI
Flanker	Jim Smith	Michigan	AP, UPI
Wide receiver	Scott Yelvington	Northwestern	AP, UPI
Tight end	Mike Cobb	Michigan State	AP, UPI
Center	Walt Downing	Michigan	AP, UPI
Guard	Mark Donahue	Michigan	AP, UPI
Guard	Connie Zelencik	Purdue	AP
Guard	Bill Lukens	Ohio State	UPI
Tackle	Bill Dufek	Michigan	AP, UPI
Tackle	Chris Ward	Ohio State	AP, UPI
Placekicker	Dan Beaver	Illinois	AP, UPI

Defense

Position	Name	Team	Selectors
Front five	Aaron Brown	Ohio State	AP, UPI [middle guard]
Front five	Bob Brudzinski	Ohio State	AP, UPI [def. end]
Front five	Nick Buonomici	Ohio State	AP, UPI [def. tackle]
Front five	Greg Morton	Michigan	AP, UPI [def. tackle]
Front five	Blane Smith	Purdue	AP
Defensive end	John Anderson	Michigan	UPI
Linebacker	Calvin O'Neal	Michigan	AP, UPI
Linebacker	Scott Studwell	Illinois	AP, UPI
Linebacker	Tom Cousineau	Ohio State	AP
Defensive back	Ray Griffin	Ohio State	AP, UPI
Defensive back	Pete Shaw	Northwestern	AP, UPI
Defensive back	Tom Hannon	Michigan State	AP
Defensive back	George Adzick	Minnesota	UPI
Defensive back	Paul Beery	Purdue	UPI

=== All-American honors ===
At the end of the 1976 season, Big Ten players secured four of the consensus first-team picks for the 1976 College Football All-America Team. The Big Ten's consensus All-Americans were:

Position	Name	Team	Selectors
Running back	Rob Lytle	Michigan	AFCA, AP, UPI, CFN, FN, NEA, TSN, WCFF
Defensive end	Bob Brudzinski	Ohio State	AFCA, AP, FWAA, UPI, CFN, TSN, WCFF
Offensive guard	Mark Donahue	Michigan	FWAA, UPI, FN, NEA, WCFF
Offensive tackle	Chris Ward	Ohio State	AFCA

Other Big Ten players who were named first-team All-Americans by at least one selector were:

Position	Name	Team	Selectors
Linebacker	Calvin O'Neal	Michigan	UPI, CFN, TSN, WCFF
Receiver	Jim Smith	Michigan	AP, TSN, FN
Punter	Tom Skladany	Ohio State	CFN, NEA [placekicker], TSN
Offensive guard	Bill Dufek	Michigan	CFN

=== Other awards ===
Michigan running back Rob Lytle finished third in the voting for the 1976 Heisman Trophy.

Bo Schembechler of Michigan was named Big Ten Coach of the Year.

== 1977 NFL draft ==
The 1977 NFL draft was held in New York on May 3–4, 1977. The following players were among the first 100 picks:

Name	Position	Team	Round	Overall pick
Mike Cobb	Tight end	Michigan State	1	22
Bob Brudzinski	Linebacker	Ohio State	1	23
Rob Lytle	Running back	Michigan	2	45
Tom Skladany	Punter	Ohio State	2	46
Pete Johnson	Running back	Ohio State	2	49
Jim Smith	Wide receiver	Michigan	3	75
Tom Hannon	Defensive back	Michigan State	3	83
Scott Dierking	Running back	Purdue	4	89
