= 1976 Ohio State Buckeyes football team =

American college football season

1976 Ohio State Buckeyes football
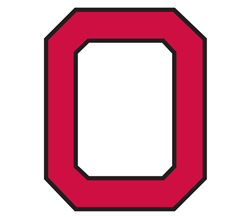

Big Ten co-champion Orange Bowl champion

Orange Bowl, W 27–10 vs. Colorado
- Conference: Big Ten Conference

Ranking
- Coaches: No. 5
- AP: No. 6
- Record: 9–2–1 (7–1 Big Ten)
- Head coach: Woody Hayes (26th season)
- Offensive coordinator: Alex Gibbs (2nd season)
- Defensive coordinator: George Hill (6th season)
- MVP: Bob Brudzinski
- Captains: Bill Lukens; Tom Skladany; Ed Thompson
- Home stadium: Ohio Stadium

1976 Big Ten Conference football standings
	Conf.					Overall
Team	W		L		T	W		L		T
No. 3 Michigan +	7	–	1	–	0	10	–	2	–	0
No. 6 Ohio State +	7	–	1	–	0	9	–	2	–	1
Minnesota	4	–	4	–	0	6	–	5	–	0
Illinois	4	–	4	–	0	5	–	6	–	0
Indiana	4	–	4	–	0	5	–	6	–	0
Purdue	4	–	4	–	0	5	–	6	–	0
Iowa	3	–	5	–	0	5	–	6	–	0
Wisconsin	3	–	5	–	0	5	–	6	–	0
Michigan State	3	–	5	–	0	4	–	6	–	1
Northwestern	1	–	7	–	0	1	–	10	–	0
+ – Conference co-champions; Rankings from AP Poll

The 1976 Ohio State Buckeyes football team was an American football team that represented the Ohio State University as a member of the Big Ten Conference during the 1976 Big Ten season. In their 26th year under head coach Woody Hayes, the Buckeyes compiled a 9–2–1 record (7–1 in conference games), tied with Michigan for the Big Ten championship, and outscored opponents by a total of 278 to 139. They lost to Michigan in the final game of the regular season and concluded the season with a 27–10 victory over Colorado in the 1977 Orange Bowl. The Buckeyes were ranked No. 6 in the final AP poll.

The Buckeyes gained an average of 235.8 rushing yards and 52.8 passing yards per game. On defense, they held opponents to 144.3 rushing yards and 118.0 passing yards per game. The team's individual statistical leaders included quarterback Jim Pacenta (404 passing yards, 52.8% completion percentage), running back Jeff Logan (1,169 rushing yards, 5.7 yards per carry), and Jim Harrell (12 receptions for 229 yards). Offensive tackle Chris Ward and defensive end Bob Brudzinski won consensus All-America honors. Punter Tom Skladany won first-team All-America honors from College Football News and The Sporting News.

The team played its home games at Ohio Stadium in Columbus, Ohio.

== Schedule ==
Date	Time	Opponent	Rank	Site	TV	Result	Attendance	Source
September 11	1:30 p.m.	Michigan State	No. 4	Ohio Stadium; Columbus, OH		W 49–21	86,509	
September 18	3:30 p.m.	at No. 7 Penn State*	No. 2	Beaver Stadium; University Park, PA (rivalry)	ABC	W 12–7	62,503	
September 25	1:30 p.m.	Missouri*	No. 2	Ohio Stadium; Columbus, OH		L 21–22	87,936	
October 2	1:30 p.m.	No. 4 UCLA*	No. 8	Ohio Stadium; Columbus, OH	ABC	T 10–10	87,969	
October 9	2:30 p.m.	at Iowa	No. 10	Kinnick Stadium; Iowa City, IA		W 34–14	59,170	
October 16	2:30 p.m.	at Wisconsin	No. 9	Camp Randall Stadium; Madison, WI		W 30–20	79,579	
October 23	1:30 p.m.	Purdue	No. 9	Ohio Stadium; Columbus, OH		W 24–3	87,898	
October 30	2:30 p.m.	at Indiana	No. 8	Memorial Stadium; Bloomington, IN		W 47–7	39,663–49,254	
November 6	1:30 p.m.	Illinois	No. 8	Ohio Stadium; Columbus, OH (Illibuck)		W 42–10	87,654	
November 13	2:00 p.m.	at Minnesota	No. 8	Memorial Stadium; Minneapolis, MN		W 9–3	53,190	
November 20	12:30 p.m.	No. 4 Michigan	No. 8	Ohio Stadium; Columbus, OH (rivalry)	ABC	L 0–22	88,250	
January 1, 1977	7:30 p.m.	vs. No. 12 Colorado*	No. 11	Miami Orange Bowl; Miami, FL (Orange Bowl)	NBC	W 27–10	65,537	
*Non-conference game; Rankings from AP Poll released prior to the game; All times are in Eastern time

== Game summaries ==
=== Missouri ===
Missouri Tigers (1–1) at #2 Ohio State Buckeyes (2–0)

Quarter	1	2	3	4	Total
Missouri	0	7	7	8	22
Ohio St	0	21	0	0	21

at Ohio Stadium, Columbus, Ohio

- Date: September 25, 1976
- Game time: 1:30 p.m.
- Game weather: Sunny, 70 °F (21 °C)
- Game attendance: 87,936

Game information

First quarter

- No scoring

Second quarter

- OSU – Pete Johnson 2-yard run (Tom Skladany kick), 14:25. Ohio St 7–0. Drive: 13 plays, 80 yards, 4:34.
- UM – Joe Stewart 31-yard pass from Pete Woods (Tim Gibbons kick), 11:56. Tie 7–7. Drive: 8 plays, 79 yards, 2:22.
- OSU – Pete Johnson 2-yard run (Tom Skladany kick), 9:47. Ohio St 14–7. Drive: 6 plays, 77 yards, 2:02.
- OSU – Pete Johnson 3-yard run (Tom Skladany kick), 7:33. Ohio St 21–7. Drive: 2 plays, 12 yards, 0:22.

Third quarter

- UM – Curtis Brown 4-yard run (Tim Gibbons kick), 9:00. Ohio St 21–14. Drive: 8 plays, 36 yards, 2:50.

Fourth quarter

- UM – Leo Lewis 2-yard pass from Pete Woods (run good), 0:12. Missouri 22–21. Drive: 12 plays, 80 yards, 4:30.

Top passers

- UM – Pete Woods – 9/19, 113 yards, 2 TD, 2 INT
- OSU – Rod Gerald – 1/8, 9 yards, INT

Top rushers

- UM – Curtis Brown – 20 rushes, 108 yards, TD
- OSU – Pete Johnson – 23 rushes, 119 yards, 3 TD

Top receivers

- UM – Joe Stewart – 3 receptions, 65 yards, TD
- OSU – Herman Jones – 1 reception, 9 yards

The loss snapped 25-game home win streak

External videos
- Game highlights (part 1)
- Game highlights (part 2)
- Game highlights (part 3)
- Game film (silent)

=== UCLA ===
Team	1	2	3	4	Total
UCLA	0	0	3	7	10
Ohio St	0	7	0	3	10

- Date: October 2
- Location: Ohio Stadium, Columbus, Ohio
- TV announcers (ABC): Keith Jackson, Ara Parseghian

Scoring summary
2	OSU	Johnson 4-yard run (Skladany kick)	OSU 7-0
3	UCLA	Corral 47-yard field goal	OSU 7-3
4	UCLA	Dankworth 1-yard run (Corral kick)	UCLA 10-7
4	OSU	Skladany 25-yard field goal	Tied 10-10

=== At Iowa ===
Team	1	2	3	4	Total
• Ohio State	21	3	10	0	34
Iowa	0	0	0	14	14

- Date: October 9
- Location: Kinnick Stadium, Iowa City, Iowa
- Game attendance: 59,170

Scoring summary
1	OSU	Gerald 17-yard run (Skladany kick)	OSU 7-0
1	OSU	Johnson 1-yard run (Skladany kick)	OSU 14-0
1	OSU	Johnson 1-yard run (Skladany kick)	OSU 21-0
2	OSU	Skaladany 26-yard field goal	OSU 24-0
3	OSU	Skladany 46-yard field goal	OSU 27-0
3	OSU	Johnson 3-yard run (Skladany kick)	OSU 34-0
4	IOWA	Sheeler 5-yard run (Quartaro kick)	OSU 34-7
4	IOWA	Caldwell 3-yard run (Quartaro kick)	OSU 34-14

=== At Minnesota ===
Team	1	2	3	4	Total
• Ohio St	3	6	0	0	9
Minnesota	0	3	0	0	3

- Date: November 13
- Location: Memorial Stadium • Minneapolis, Minnesota

Scoring summary
1	OHST	Skladany 39-yard field goal	Ohio St 3-0
2	MINN	Rogind 49-yard field goal	Tie 3-3
2	OHST	Pacenta 4-yard run (kick blocked)	Ohio St 9-3

Ohio State clinches at least a share of Big Ten title for record fifth straight year.

=== Orange Bowl (vs Colorado) ===
Team	1	2	3	4	Total
Colorado	10	0	0	0	10
• Ohio State	7	10	3	7	27

- Date: January 1
- Location: Miami Orange Bowl, Miami, Florida
- Game attendance: 65,537

Scoring summary
1	CU	Zetterberg 26-yard field goal	CU 3-0
1	CU	Morehead 11-yard pass from Knapple (Zetterberg kick)	CU 10-0
1	OSU	Logan 36-yard run (Skladany kick)	CU 10-7
2	OSU	Skaldany 28-yard field goal	Tied 10-10
2	OSU	Johnson 3-yard run (Skladany kick)	OSU 17-10
3	OSU	Skladany 20-yard field goal	OSU 20-10
4	OSU	Rod Gerald 4-yard run (Skladany kick)	OSU 27-10

== Personnel ==
=== Roster ===
1976 Ohio State Buckeyes football team roster
Players
Coaches
Offense

Pos.	#	Name	Class
G	69	Ernest Andria	So
QB	19	Mickey Archer	So
TE	82	Ronald Barwig	Fr
FB	29	Thomas Blinco	Fr
OT	76	Tim Burke	So
G	63	Scott Burris	Fr
QB	7	Greg Castignola	Fr
OT	78	Garth Cox	Jr
SE	88	Marc Cox	Fr
C	50	Michael Datish	Sr
RB	89	Bryan Ferguson	Fr
G	56	Kenneth Fritz	Fr
QB	8	Rod Gerald	So
TB	42	Lester Gordon	So
RB	11	James Harrell	Sr
FB	24	Charles Hunter	Fr
RB	35	Robert Hyatt	Sr
TB	47	Matthew Jackson	Fr
OT	77	William Jaco	So
FB	33	Pete Johnson	Sr
TB	48	Ricky Johnson	Fr
SE	49	Herman Jones	Jr
C	51	Mark Lang	Jr
G	92	Joel Laser	So
FB	25	James Laughlin	Fr
TE	91	Robert Lillie	Jr
TB	34	Jeff Logan	Jr
G	64	William Lukens (C)	Sr
OT	73	Douglas Mackie	Fr
FB	2	Larry Molls	Sr
TE	99	Jimmy Moore	So
QB	15	James Pacenta	Sr
OT	74	Louis Pietrini	Sr
C	53	Douglas Porter	Jr
G	65	Barney Renard	Sr
OT	70	Joseph Robinson	So
G	57	James Savoca	Jr
FB	37	Michael Schneider	Fr
TB	23	Ron Springs	So
TE	80	Grgeory Storer	Jr
QB	6	Michael Strahine	Jr
C	52	Tim Vogler	So
FB	18	Ric Volley	Fr
OT	79	Chris Ward	Jr
G	58	Thomas Waugh	So

Defense

Pos.	#	Name	Class
LB	94	David Adkins	Jr
S	22	Joseph Allegro	Jr
DT	67	Eddie Beamon	Jr
DE	81	Farley Bell	So
MG	55	Aaron Brown	Jr
LB	27	Richard Brown	So
DE	84	Robert Brudzinski	Sr
DT	75	Nicholas Buonamici	Sr
LB	38	Paul Campbell	Fr
MG	71	Byron Cato	So
LB	36	Tom Cousineau	So
DE	96	Martin Cusick	Jr
DE	32	Kelton Dansler	So
DE	86	Joseph Dixon	Jr
LB	60	Gary Dulin	Fr
DB	4	Jeff Ferrelli	Jr
LB	52	John Fisher	So
S	46	Duncan Griffin	So
S	44	Ray Griffin	Jr
DB	12	Mike Guess	Fr
LB	90	Davis Hall	Fr
DT	66	Tyrone Harris	Jr
DE	83	Joseph Hornik	So
DE	98	Paul Jones	Jr
DB	21	Max Midlam	Sr
LB	95	Brian Lewis	Jr
DT	62	Ed Mills	Fr
DB	20	Leonard Mills	So
DB	26	Thomas Roche	Jr
LB	16	Paul Ross	Jr
DB	43	Bruce Ruhl	Sr
MG	68	Tim Sawicki	Fr
DB	14	Brian Schwartz	Fr
LB	30	Charles Simon	Jr
DT	72	Mark Sullivan	So
LB	9	Ed Thompson (C)	Sr
LB	97	Terry Vogler	So
S	5	Scott Wolery	Sr
DT	61	Douglas Wymer	Fr

Special teams

Pos.	#	Name	Class
P	3	David Budd	Fr
K	1	Tom Skladany (C)	Sr

Head coach

- Woody Hayes (26th year)

Coordinators/assistant coaches

- George Chaump – Offense (9th year)
- George Hill (American football) – Defensive Coordinator (6th year)
- Alex Gibbs – Offensive Coordinator/ Offensive Line (2nd year)
- Mickey Jackson – (3rd year)
- John Mummey – Quarterbacks (8th year)
- Ralph Staub – (7th year)
- Dick Walker – Defensive Backs (8th year)

Legend

- (C) Team captain
- (S) Suspended
- (I) Ineligible
- Injured
- Redshirt

=== Depth chart ===
Defense

FS
Joe Allegro
Duncan Griffin

WLB	SLB
Ed Thompson	Tom Cousineau
⋅	Dave Adkins

SS
Ray Griffin
⋅

CB
Mike Guess
Lenny Mills

DE	DT	NT	DT	DE
Bob Brudzinski	Nick Buonamici	Aaron Brown	Eddie Beamon	Kelton Dansler
⋅	⋅	⋅	⋅	⋅

CB
Tom Roche
Bruce Ruhl

Offense

SE
Herman Jones
Bob Hyatt

LT	LG	C	RG	RT
Chris Ward	Jim Savoca	Mark Lang	Bill Lukens	Lou Pietrini
Garth Cox	Ron Ayers	⋅	⋅	Doug Mackie

TE
Greg Storer
Joe Robinson

WB
Jim Harrell
⋅

QB
Rod Gerald
Jim Pacenta

FB
Pete Johnson
Paul Campbell

Special teams
PK Tom Skladany
P Tom Skladany

RB
Jeff Logan
Ron Springs

== 1977 NFL draftees ==
Player	Round	Pick	Position	NFL club
Bob Brudzinski	1	23	Linebacker	Los Angeles Rams
Tom Skladany	2	46	Punter	Cleveland Browns
Pete Johnson	2	49	Running back	Cincinnati Bengals
Ed Thompson	8	210	Linebacker	New York Jets
Nick Buonamici	9	238	Defensive tackle	Chicago Bears
