= 1976 Illinois Fighting Illini football team =

American college football season

1976 Illinois Fighting Illini football
- Conference: Big Ten Conference
- Record: 5–6 (4–4 Big Ten)
- Head coach: Bob Blackman (6th season)
- MVPs: Jerry Finis; Scott Studwell
- Captains: Marty Friel; Dean March; Scott Studwell
- Home stadium: Memorial Stadium

1976 Big Ten Conference football standings
	Conf.					Overall
Team	W		L		T	W		L		T
No. 3 Michigan +	7	–	1	–	0	10	–	2	–	0
No. 6 Ohio State +	7	–	1	–	0	9	–	2	–	1
Minnesota	4	–	4	–	0	6	–	5	–	0
Illinois	4	–	4	–	0	5	–	6	–	0
Indiana	4	–	4	–	0	5	–	6	–	0
Purdue	4	–	4	–	0	5	–	6	–	0
Iowa	3	–	5	–	0	5	–	6	–	0
Wisconsin	3	–	5	–	0	5	–	6	–	0
Michigan State	3	–	5	–	0	4	–	6	–	1
Northwestern	1	–	7	–	0	1	–	10	–	0
+ – Conference co-champions; Rankings from AP Poll

The 1976 Illinois Fighting Illini football team was an American football team that represented the University of Illinois as a member of the Big Ten Conference during the 1976 Big Ten season. In their sixth year under head coach Bob Blackman, the Fighting Illini compiled a 5–6 record (4–4 in conference games), finished in a four-way tie for third place in the Big Ten, and were outscored by a total of 248 to 235.

The team's statistical leaders included quarterback Kurt Steger (1,243 passing yards, 46.5% completion rate), running back James Coleman (687 rushing yards, 4.0 yards per carry, 60 points scored), and wide receiver Eric Rouse (326 receiving yards). Offensive tackle Jerry Finis and linebacker Scott Studwell were selected as the team's most valuable players. Studwell and kicker Dan Beaver received first-team honors on the 1976 All-Big Ten Conference football team.

The team played its home games at Memorial Stadium in Champaign, Illinois.

== Schedule ==
Date	Opponent	Rank	Site	Result	Attendance	Source
September 11	Iowa		Memorial Stadium; Champaign, IL	W 24–6	49,515	
September 18	at No. 6 Missouri*		Faurot Field; Columbia, MO (rivalry)	W 31–6	63,486	
September 25	Baylor*	No. 14	Memorial Stadium; Champaign, IL	L 19–34	44,481	
October 2	Texas A&M*		Memorial Stadium; Champaign, IL	L 7–14	67,543	
October 9	at Minnesota		Memorial Stadium; Minneapolis, MN	L 14–29	52,606	
October 16	at Purdue		Ross–Ade Stadium; West Lafayette, IN (rivalry)	W 21–17	66,716	
October 23	Michigan State		Memorial Stadium; Champaign, IL	L 23–31	52,860	
October 30	Wisconsin		Memorial Stadium; Champaign, IL	W 31–25	54,121	
November 6	at No. 8 Ohio State		Ohio Stadium; Columbus, OH (Illibuck)	L 10–42	87,654	
November 13	at No. 4 Michigan		Michigan Stadium; Ann Arbor, MI (rivalry)	L 7–38	104,107	
November 20	Northwestern		Memorial Stadium; Champaign, IL (rivalry)	W 48–6	30,000	
*Non-conference game; Rankings from AP Poll released prior to the game

== Roster ==
1976 Illinois Fighting Illini football team roster
Players
Coaches
Offense

Pos.	#	Name	Class

Defense

Pos.	#	Name	Class
LB	67	Scott Studwell	Sr
LB	97	John Sullivan	So

Special teams

Pos.	#	Name	Class

Head coach

- Bob Blackman

Coordinators/assistant coaches

Legend

- (C) Team captain
- (S) Suspended
- (I) Ineligible
- Injured
- Redshirt

Roster
