= 1976 Michigan State Spartans football team =

American college football season

1976 Michigan State Spartans football
- Conference: Big Ten Conference
- Record: 4–6–1 (3–5 Big Ten)
- Head coach: Darryl Rogers (1st season)
- Defensive coordinator: Bob Padilla (1st season)
- MVP: Richard Baes
- Captains: Richard Baes; Tommy Hannon
- Home stadium: Spartan Stadium

1976 Big Ten Conference football standings
	Conf.					Overall
Team	W		L		T	W		L		T
No. 3 Michigan +	7	–	1	–	0	10	–	2	–	0
No. 6 Ohio State +	7	–	1	–	0	9	–	2	–	1
Minnesota	4	–	4	–	0	6	–	5	–	0
Illinois	4	–	4	–	0	5	–	6	–	0
Indiana	4	–	4	–	0	5	–	6	–	0
Purdue	4	–	4	–	0	5	–	6	–	0
Iowa	3	–	5	–	0	5	–	6	–	0
Wisconsin	3	–	5	–	0	5	–	6	–	0
Michigan State	3	–	5	–	0	4	–	6	–	1
Northwestern	1	–	7	–	0	1	–	10	–	0
+ – Conference co-champions; Rankings from AP Poll

The 1976 Michigan State Spartans football team was an American football team that represented Michigan State University as a member of the Big Ten Conference during the 1976 Big Ten football season. In their first season under head coach Darryl Rogers, the Spartans compiled a 4–6–1 record (3–5 in conference games), finished in a three-way tie for seventh place in the Big Ten, and were outscored by a total of 278 to 236. In three games against ranked opponents, they lost to No. 4 Ohio State, No. 18 Notre Dame, and No. 1 Michigan.

On offense, the Spartans gained an average of 175.5 rushing yards and 211.1 passing yards per game. On defense, they gave up 256.5 rushing yards and 116.2 passing yards per game. The individual statistical leaders included quarterback Ed Smith with 1,749 passing yards (tops in the Big Ten), Richard Baes with 931 rushing yards, and flanker Kirk Gibson with 39 receptions for 748 receiving yards (tops in the Big Ten). Baes was selected as the team's most valuable player.

Seven Spartans were selected by either the Associated Press (AP) or the United Press International (UPI) for the 1976 All-Big Ten Conference football teams: tight end Mike Cobb (AP-1, UPI-1); defensive back Tommy Hannon (AP-1, UPI-1); flanker Kirk Gibson (AP-2, UPI-2); center Al Pitts (AP-2, UPI-2); defensive tackle Larry Bethea (AP-2, UPI-2); offensive tackle Tony Bruggenthies (AP-2); and defensive end Otto Smith (UPI-2).

The team played its home games at Spartan Stadium in East Lansing, Michigan.

== Schedule ==
Date	Opponent	Site	Result	Attendance	Source
September 11	at No. 4 Ohio State	Ohio Stadium; Columbus, OH	L 21–49	86,509	
September 18	Wyoming*	Spartan Stadium; East Lansing, MI	W 21–10	57,183	
September 25	at NC State*	Carter Stadium; Raleigh, NC	T 31–31	38,300	
October 2	No. 18 Notre Dame*	Spartan Stadium; East Lansing, MI (rivalry)	L 6–24	77,081	
October 9	at No. 1 Michigan	Michigan Stadium; Ann Arbor, MI (rivalry)	L 10–42	104,211	
October 16	Minnesota^{†}	Spartan Stadium; East Lansing, MI	L 10–14	56,166	
October 23	at Illinois	Memorial Stadium; Champaign, IL	W 31–23	52,860	
October 30	Purdue	Spartan Stadium; East Lansing, MI	W 45–13	52,222	
November 6	Indiana	Spartan Stadium; East Lansing, MI (rivalry)	W 23–0	50,376	
November 13	at Northwestern	Dyche Stadium; Evanston, IL	L 21–42	15,204	
November 20	Iowa	Spartan Stadium; East Lansing, MI	L 17–30	48,412	
*Non-conference game; ^{†}Homecoming; Rankings from AP Poll released prior to the game

== Roster ==
- DB No. 16 Mark Anderson, Fr.
- TE Mike Cobb, Sr.
- RB Jim Earley, Jr.
- WR Kirk Gibson, So.
- LB No, 57 Larry Savage, Fr.

== Game summaries ==
=== Michigan ===
Week 5: Michigan State at Michigan

Team	1	2	3	4	Total
Michigan State	10	0	0	0	10
• Michigan	14	14	7	7	42

- Date: October 9, 1976
- Location: Michigan Stadium, Ann Arbor, MI
- Game attendance: 104,211

Scoring summary
1	MSU	Nielsen 24-yard field goal	MSU 3-0
1	MICH	Lytle 75-yard run (Wood kick)	MICH 7-3
1	MICH	Huckleby 38-yard run (Wood kick)	MICH 14-3
1	MSU	Brammer 10-yard pass from E. Smith (Nielsen kick)	MICH 14-10
2	MICH	Leach 3-yard run (Wood kick)	MICH 21-10
2	MICH	Huckleby 1-yard run (Wood kick)	MICH 28-10
3	MICH	Huckleby 2-yard run (Wood kick)	MICH 35-10
4	MICH	Zuver 60-yard interception return (Wood kick)	MICH 42-10

On October 9, 1976, Michigan State played its cross-state rival Michigan in the annual battle for the Paul Bunyan Trophy. The Wolverines had won six straight games with the last victory for the Spartans dating back to 1969. Michigan extended the streak to seven games with a 42-10 victory at Michigan Stadium. Michigan's 42 points was the most it had scored against Michigan State since 1947.

Fullback Rob Lytle rushed for 180 yards on 10 carries, including a 45-yard gain on a fake punt and a 75-yard touchdown run in the first quarter. After the game, Bo Schembechler said of Lytle, "If that guy isn't an All-American, I don't know who is." Lytle added, "All backs like to break away on a long one like that. It was the longest run I've had at Michigan. In fact, I think this was my biggest day ever." Harlan Huckleby rushed for 126 yards and three touchdowns on 23 carries. Russell Davis added 91 yards on 13 carries. In all, the Wolverines rushed for 442 yards on 62 carries against the Spartans. Quarterback Rick Leach completed five of seven passes for 93 yards and rushed for 36 yards on 11 carries. Wolfman Jerry Zuver scored Michigan's final touchdown on a 60-yard interception return in the fourth quarter.

In the AP Poll released on the Monday after the game, Michigan retained its #1 ranking with 57 out of 60 first-place votes and 1,194 points out of a possible 1,200 points. Pittsburgh was ranked #2 with the remaining three first-place votes.
