= 1976 Indiana Hoosiers football team =

American college football season

1976 Indiana Hoosiers football
- Conference: Big Ten Conference
- Record: 5–6 (4–4 Big Ten)
- Head coach: Lee Corso (4th season)
- MVP: Steve Sanders
- Captains: Craig Brinkman; Joe Doggett; Dave Knowles; Bob Kramer; Tim McVay; Courtney Snyder
- Home stadium: Memorial Stadium

1976 Big Ten Conference football standings
	Conf.					Overall
Team	W		L		T	W		L		T
No. 3 Michigan +	7	–	1	–	0	10	–	2	–	0
No. 6 Ohio State +	7	–	1	–	0	9	–	2	–	1
Minnesota	4	–	4	–	0	6	–	5	–	0
Illinois	4	–	4	–	0	5	–	6	–	0
Indiana	4	–	4	–	0	5	–	6	–	0
Purdue	4	–	4	–	0	5	–	6	–	0
Iowa	3	–	5	–	0	5	–	6	–	0
Wisconsin	3	–	5	–	0	5	–	6	–	0
Michigan State	3	–	5	–	0	4	–	6	–	1
Northwestern	1	–	7	–	0	1	–	10	–	0
+ – Conference co-champions; Rankings from AP Poll

The 1976 Indiana Hoosiers football team was an American football team that represented the Indiana Hoosiers in the 1976 Big Ten Conference football season. The Hoosiers played their home games at Memorial Stadium in Bloomington, Indiana. The team was coached by Lee Corso, in his fourth year as head coach of the Hoosiers.

== Schedule ==
Date	Opponent	Site	Result	Attendance	Source
September 11	at Minnesota	Memorial Stadium; Minneapolis, MN	L 13–32	39,004	
September 18	No. 8 Nebraska*	Memorial Stadium; Bloomington, IN	L 13–45	41,289	
September 25	at Washington*	Husky Stadium; Seattle, WA	W 20–13	42,206	
October 2	NC State*	Memorial Stadium; Bloomington, IN	L 21–24	32,090	
October 9	Northwestern^{†}	Memorial Stadium; Bloomington, IN	W 7–0	34,889	
October 16	at Iowa	Kinnick Stadium; Iowa City, IA	W 14–7	57,465	
October 23	No. 1 Michigan	Memorial Stadium; Bloomington, IN	L 0–35	30,416	
October 30	No. 8 Ohio State	Memorial Stadium; Bloomington, IN	L 7–47	39,663	
November 6	at Michigan State	Spartan Stadium; East Lansing, MI (rivalry)	L 0–23	50,376	
November 13	Wisconsin	Memorial Stadium; Bloomington, IN	W 15–14	27,518	
November 20	at Purdue	Ross–Ade Stadium; West Lafayette, IN (Old Oaken Bucket)	W 20–14	63,220	
*Non-conference game; ^{†}Homecoming; Rankings from AP Poll released prior to the game

== Players selected in the 1977 NFL draft ==
Player	Position	Round	Pick	NFL club
Dave Knowles	Offensive tackle	9	231	New Orleans Saints
