= 1976 Northwestern Wildcats football team =

American college football season

1976 Northwestern Wildcats football
- Conference: Big Ten Conference
- Record: 1–10 (1–7 Big Ten)
- Head coach: John Pont (4th season)
- Captains: Greg Boykin; Randy Dean; Paul Maly; Pete Shaw
- Home stadium: Dyche Stadium

1976 Big Ten Conference football standings
	Conf.					Overall
Team	W		L		T	W		L		T
No. 3 Michigan +	7	–	1	–	0	10	–	2	–	0
No. 6 Ohio State +	7	–	1	–	0	9	–	2	–	1
Minnesota	4	–	4	–	0	6	–	5	–	0
Illinois	4	–	4	–	0	5	–	6	–	0
Indiana	4	–	4	–	0	5	–	6	–	0
Purdue	4	–	4	–	0	5	–	6	–	0
Iowa	3	–	5	–	0	5	–	6	–	0
Wisconsin	3	–	5	–	0	5	–	6	–	0
Michigan State	3	–	5	–	0	4	–	6	–	1
Northwestern	1	–	7	–	0	1	–	10	–	0
+ – Conference co-champions; Rankings from AP Poll

The 1976 Northwestern Wildcats team represented Northwestern University during the 1976 Big Ten Conference football season. In their fourth year under head coach John Pont, the Wildcats compiled a 1–10 record (1–7 against Big Ten Conference opponents) and finished in last place in the Big Ten Conference.

The team's offensive leaders were quarterback Randy Dean with 1,384 passing yards, Pat Geegan with 537 rushing yards, and Scott Yelvington with 649 receiving yards. Yelvington received first-team All-Big Ten honors from both the Associated Press and the United Press International.

== Schedule ==
Date	Opponent	Site	Result	Attendance	Source
September 11	at Purdue	Ross–Ade Stadium; West Lafayette, IN	L 19–31	46,311	
September 18	at North Carolina*	Kenan Memorial Stadium; Chapel Hill, NC	L 0–12	41,000	
September 25	Notre Dame*	Dyche Stadium; Evanston, IL (rivalry)	L 0–48	44,396	
October 2	Arizona*	Dyche Stadium; Evanston, IL	L 15–27	23,097	
October 9	at Indiana	Memorial Stadium; Bloomington, IN	L 0–7	34,889	
October 16	No. 1 Michigan	Dyche Stadium; Evanston, IL (rivalry)	L 7–38	31,045	
October 23	Wisconsin	Dyche Stadium; Evanston, IL	L 25–28	24,580	
October 30	at Iowa	Kinnick Stadium; Iowa City, IA	L 10–13	51,800	
November 6	Minnesota	Dyche Stadium; Evanston, IL	L 10–38	15,183	
November 13	Michigan State	Dyche Stadium; Evanston, IL	W 42–21	15,204	
November 20	at Illinois	Memorial Stadium; Champaign, IL (rivalry)	L 6–48	30,000	
*Non-conference game; Rankings from AP Poll released prior to the game

== Roster ==
1976 Northwestern Wildcats football team roster
Players
Coaches
Offense

Pos.	#	Name	Class
OT	68	Tony Ardizzone	Jr
WR	83	Mark Bailey	Jr
QB	15	Steve Breitbell	So
RB	32	Greg Boykin (C)	Sr
QB	3	Randy Dean (C)	Sr
DB	2	Robert Dean	Sr
FB	39	Harold Gilmore	So
OL	63	Dan Henderson	So
OT	72	Don Herzog	Sr
C	61	Carl Peterson	Sr

Defense

Pos.	#	Name	Class
DE	35	Kevin Berg	Fr
CB	18	Steve Bobowski	Jr
FS	14	Jim Hutchings	Sr
CB	6	Guy Knafelc	So
LB	52	Paul Maly	Sr
SS	22	Pete Shaw (C)	Sr
DT	74	Norm Wells	Fr

Special teams

Pos.	#	Name	Class

Head coach

- John Pont

Coordinators/assistant coaches

Legend

- (C) Team captain
- (S) Suspended
- (I) Ineligible
- Injured
- Redshirt
