= 1976 Minnesota Golden Gophers football team =

American college football season

1976 Minnesota Golden Gophers football
- Conference: Big Ten Conference
- Record: 6–5 (4–4 Big Ten)
- Head coach: Cal Stoll (5th season)
- MVP: Tony Dungy
- Captain: Tony Dungy
- Home stadium: Memorial Stadium

1976 Big Ten Conference football standings
	Conf.					Overall
Team	W		L		T	W		L		T
No. 3 Michigan +	7	–	1	–	0	10	–	2	–	0
No. 6 Ohio State +	7	–	1	–	0	9	–	2	–	1
Minnesota	4	–	4	–	0	6	–	5	–	0
Illinois	4	–	4	–	0	5	–	6	–	0
Indiana	4	–	4	–	0	5	–	6	–	0
Purdue	4	–	4	–	0	5	–	6	–	0
Iowa	3	–	5	–	0	5	–	6	–	0
Wisconsin	3	–	5	–	0	5	–	6	–	0
Michigan State	3	–	5	–	0	4	–	6	–	1
Northwestern	1	–	7	–	0	1	–	10	–	0
+ – Conference co-champions; Rankings from AP Poll

The 1976 Minnesota Golden Gophers football team was an American football team that represented the University of Minnesota in the 1976 Big Ten Conference football season. In their fifth year under head coach Cal Stoll, the Golden Gophers compiled a 6–5 record (4–4 against conference opponents), finished in a four-way tie for third place in the Big Ten Standings, and were outscored by their opponents by a combined total of 211 to 201.

Quarterback Tony Dungy received the team's most valuable player award for the second consecutive year. Strong safety George Adzick was named All-Big Ten first team. Dungy, wide receiver Ron Kullas and defensive lineman George Washington were named All-Big Ten second team. Dungy, offensive lineman Brien Harvey, fullback Kent Kitzmann and cornerback Bob Weber were named Academic All-Big Ten. Terry Matula was named Offensive Lineman of the Year. Jim Perkins was the Big Ten's third leading scorer with 78 points on 13 rushing touchdowns.

Home attendance for the season was 257,878, which averaged to 42,979. The season high for attendance was against rival Iowa. 1976 was the last season of Tartan Turf at Memorial Stadium.

== Schedule ==
Date	Opponent	Site	Result	Attendance	Source
September 11	Indiana	Memorial Stadium; Minneapolis, MN	W 32–13	39,004	
September 18	Washington State*	Memorial Stadium; Minneapolis, MN	W 28–14	31,627	
September 25	Western Michigan*	Memorial Stadium; Minneapolis, MN	W 21–10	33,229	
October 2	at Washington*	Husky Stadium; Seattle, WA	L 7–38	37,994	
October 9	Illinois^{†}	Memorial Stadium; Minneapolis, MN	W 29–14	52,606	
October 16	at Michigan State	Spartan Stadium; East Lansing, MI	W 14–10	56,166	
October 23	Iowa	Memorial Stadium; Minneapolis, MN (rivalry)	L 12–22	53,222	
October 30	at No. 1 Michigan	Michigan Stadium; Ann Arbor, MI (Little Brown Jug)	L 0–45	104,426	
November 6	at Northwestern	Dyche Stadium; Evanston, IL	W 38–10	15,183	
November 13	No. 8 Ohio State	Memorial Stadium; Minneapolis, MN	L 3–9	53,190	
November 20	at Wisconsin	Camp Randall Stadium; Madison, WI (rivalry)	L 17–26	60,304	
*Non-conference game; ^{†}Homecoming; Rankings from AP Poll released prior to the game

== Roster ==
1976 Minnesota Golden Gophers football team roster
Players
Coaches
Offense

Pos.	#	Name	Class
QB	9	Tony Dungy	Sr
QB	18	Marc Trestman	So

Defense

Pos.	#	Name	Class
LB	84	Michael Hunt	Jr
DE	88	Mark Merrill	Jr
LB	97	Steve Stewart	Jr

Special teams

Pos.	#	Name	Class

Head coach

- Cal Stoll

Coordinators/assistant coaches

Legend

- (C) Team captain
- (S) Suspended
- (I) Ineligible
- Injured
- Redshirt

Roster
Last update: 2018-03-11
