= 1976 Purdue Boilermakers football team =

American college football season

1976 Purdue Boilermakers football
- Conference: Big Ten Conference
- Record: 5–6 (4–4 Big Ten)
- Head coach: Alex Agase (4th season)
- MVP: Scott Dierking
- Captains: Scott Dierking; Blane Smith
- Home stadium: Ross–Ade Stadium

1976 Big Ten Conference football standings
	Conf.					Overall
Team	W		L		T	W		L		T
No. 3 Michigan +	7	–	1	–	0	10	–	2	–	0
No. 6 Ohio State +	7	–	1	–	0	9	–	2	–	1
Minnesota	4	–	4	–	0	6	–	5	–	0
Illinois	4	–	4	–	0	5	–	6	–	0
Indiana	4	–	4	–	0	5	–	6	–	0
Purdue	4	–	4	–	0	5	–	6	–	0
Iowa	3	–	5	–	0	5	–	6	–	0
Wisconsin	3	–	5	–	0	5	–	6	–	0
Michigan State	3	–	5	–	0	4	–	6	–	1
Northwestern	1	–	7	–	0	1	–	10	–	0
+ – Conference co-champions; Rankings from AP Poll

The 1976 Purdue Boilermakers football team was an American football team that represented Purdue University in the 1976 Big Ten Conference football season. In their fourth and final season under head coach Alex Agase, the Boilermakers compiled a 5–6 record (4–4 against conference opponents) and finished in a four-way tie for third place in the Big Ten standings.

Running back Scott Dierking led the team with 1,000 rushing yards and 66 points scored. He was selected by his teammates as the team's most valuable player and finished second to Rob Lytle in the voting for the Chicago Tribune Silver Football, awarded to the Big Ten's most valuable player. Dierking was also named by the Associated Press (AP) as a second-team All-American and by the AP and United Press International (UPI) as a first-team running back on the 1976 All-Big Ten Conference football team.

Other statistical leaders included quarterback Mark Vitali with 1,184 passing yards. In addition to Dierking, three other Purdue players received honors on the 1976 All-Big Ten team: offensive guard Connie Zelencik (AP-1, UPI-2); defensive end Blane Smith (AP-1, UPI-2); and defensive back Paul Beery (AP-2, UPI-1).

== Schedule ==
Date	Opponent	Site	Result	Attendance	Source
September 11	Northwestern	Ross–Ade Stadium; West Lafayette, IN	W 31–19	46,311	
September 18	at Notre Dame*	Notre Dame Stadium; Notre Dame, IN (rivalry)	L 0–23	59,075	
September 25	No. 19 USC*	Ross–Ade Stadium; West Lafayette, IN	L 13–31	65,425	
October 2	Miami (OH)*	Ross–Ade Stadium; West Lafayette, IN	W 42–20	55,102	
October 9	at Wisconsin	Camp Randall Stadium; Madison, WI	W 18–16	79,111	
October 16	Illinois^{†}	Ross–Ade Stadium; West Lafayette, IN (rivalry)	L 17–21	66,716	
October 23	at No. 9 Ohio State	Ohio Stadium; Columbus, OH	L 3–24	87,898	
October 30	at Michigan State	Spartan Stadium; East Lansing, MI	L 13–45	52,222	
November 6	No. 1 Michigan	Ross–Ade Stadium; West Lafayette, IN	W 16–14	57,205	
November 13	at Iowa	Kinnick Stadium; Iowa City, IA	W 21–0	44,763	
November 20	Indiana	Ross–Ade Stadium; West Lafayette, IN (Old Oaken Bucket)	L 14–20	63,220	
*Non-conference game; ^{†}Homecoming; Rankings from AP Poll released prior to the game

== Game summaries ==
=== Northwestern ===
- Scott Dierking 27 rushes, 151 yards

=== At Notre Dame ===
Purdue Boilermakers (1–0) at Notre Dame Fighting Irish (0–1)

Quarter	1	2	3	4	Total
Purdue	0	0	0	0	0
Notre Dame	3	7	7	6	23

at Notre Dame Stadium, South Bend, Indiana

- Date: September 18
- Game attendance: 59,075
- Recap/Box

Game information

First quarter

- ND – Dave Reeve 39-yard field goal, 0:47. Notre Dame 3–0. Drive:

Second quarter

- ND – Mark McLane 33-yard pass from Al Hunter (Dave Reeve kick). Notre Dame 10–0. Drive:

Third quarter

- ND – Rick Slager 1-yard run (Dave Reeve kick). Notre Dame 17–0. Drive:

Fourth quarter

- ND – Al Hunter 2-yard run (kick failed). Notre Dame 23–0. Drive: 49 yards.

Top passers

- PUR
- ND

Top rushers

- PUR
- ND

Top receivers

- PUR
- ND

=== Miami (OH) ===
- Scott Dierking 28 rushes, 211 yards
- John Skibinski 15 rushes, 121 yards

=== At Wisconsin ===
Paul Beery's fourth interception and Rock Supan's 20-yard field goal with a little over two minutes remaining lifted Purdue to victory.

=== Michigan ===
#1 Michigan at Purdue

Team	1	2	3	4	Total
Michigan	7	0	7	0	14
• Purdue	7	6	0	3	16

- Date: Saturday, November 6
- Location: Ross–Ade Stadium, West Lafayette, Indiana
- Source: Palm Beach Post

Scoring summary
1		MICH	Leach 8-yard run (Wood kick)	MICH 7-0
1		PUR	Dierking 4-yard run (Supan kick)	Tied 7-7
2		PUR	Dierking 25-yard run (kick blocked)	PUR 13-7
3		MICH	Smith 65-yard pass from Leach (Wood kick)	MICH 14-13
4	4:20	PUR	Supan 23-yard field goal	PUR 16-14

- PUR: Scott Dierking 38 rushes, 162 yards

=== At Iowa ===
Team	1	2	3	4	Total
• Purdue	6	8	7	0	21
Iowa	0	0	0	0	0

- Date: November 13
- Location: Kinnick Stadium, Iowa City, Iowa

Scoring summary
1	Purdue	Vitali 3-yard run (kick failed)	Purdue 6-0
2	Purdue	Vitali 20-yard run (Dierking run)	Purdue 14-0
3	Purdue	Vitali 1-yard run (Supan kick)	Purdue 21-0

== Roster ==
1976 Purdue Boilermakers football team roster
Players
Coaches
Offense

Pos.	#	Name	Class
WR	21	Reggie Arnold
QB	7	Steve Barr
RB	25	Scott Dierking (C)	Sr
TE	88	Tim Eubank
G	55	Tom Gibson
OT	63	Dave LaFary	Sr
OT	71	Jim LeFeber
RB		Bennie Leverett
RB		Rick Moss
WR		Jappy Oliver
FB	31	John Skibinski	Jr
WR		Raymond Smith
RB	81	Ricky Smith
WR	42	Jesse Townsend	Jr
C	65	Jay Venzin	Sr
QB	18	Mark Vitali	Sr
C	51	Rich Wetendorf	Sr
TE	80	Nigel Wirgowski	Sr
G	50	Connie Zelencik	Sr

Defense

Pos.	#	Name	Class
LB	48	Fred Arrington
DT	73	Chris Barr
S		Paul Beery
DE	96	Kim Cripe
DT		Cleveland Crosby
CB	46	Pat Harris	Jr
CB		Jerome King
MG		Ken Loushin
LB	59	Bob Mannella
LB		Kevin Motts
CB, RB	24	Mike Northington
DE	91	Blane Smith (C)	Sr
S, K	20	Rock Supan

Special teams

Pos.	#	Name	Class
P		Dave Eagin
K		Scott Sovereen
K		John Turner

Head coach

- Alex Agase

Coordinators/assistant coaches

- George Catavolos (DB)
- Fred Conti
- Jack Ellis
- Bob Geiger
- Jerry Hartman
- Pat Naughton
- Tom Roggeman
- Rick Venturi
- Stan Parrish (GA)
- Mike Wynn

Legend

- (C) Team captain
- (S) Suspended
- (I) Ineligible
- Injured
- Redshirt

== Awards ==
Red Mackey Award: Mark Vitali

== Statistics ==
=== Passing ===
Player	Comp	Att	Yards	TD	INT
Mark Vitali	73	172	1,184	0	16
Scott Dierking			92		

=== Rushing ===
Player	Att	Yards	TD
Scott Dierking	201	1,000	11
John Skibinski	173	871	
Mark Vitali	100	317	

=== Receiving ===
Player	Rec	Yards	TD
Reggie Arnold	16	287	
Raymond Smith	11	233	
John Skibinski	13	118	
