= 1976 Michigan Wolverines football team =

American college football season

1976 Michigan Wolverines football

Big Ten co-champion

Rose Bowl, L 6–14 vs. USC
- Conference: Big Ten Conference

Ranking
- Coaches: No. 3
- AP: No. 3
- Record: 10–2 (7–1 Big Ten)
- Head coach: Bo Schembechler (8th season)
- Defensive coordinator: Gary Moeller (4th season)
- MVP: Rob Lytle
- Captains: Kirk Lewis; Rob Lytle; Calvin O'Neal
- Home stadium: Michigan Stadium

1976 Big Ten Conference football standings
	Conf.					Overall
Team	W		L		T	W		L		T
No. 3 Michigan +	7	–	1	–	0	10	–	2	–	0
No. 6 Ohio State +	7	–	1	–	0	9	–	2	–	1
Minnesota	4	–	4	–	0	6	–	5	–	0
Illinois	4	–	4	–	0	5	–	6	–	0
Indiana	4	–	4	–	0	5	–	6	–	0
Purdue	4	–	4	–	0	5	–	6	–	0
Iowa	3	–	5	–	0	5	–	6	–	0
Wisconsin	3	–	5	–	0	5	–	6	–	0
Michigan State	3	–	5	–	0	4	–	6	–	1
Northwestern	1	–	7	–	0	1	–	10	–	0
+ – Conference co-champions; Rankings from AP Poll

The 1976 Michigan Wolverines football team represented the University of Michigan in the 1976 Big Ten Conference football season. In their eighth year under head coach Bo Schembechler, the Wolverines finished the season with a 10–2 record, won the Big Ten Conference championship, and played in the 1977 Rose Bowl. The Wolverines outscored their opponents 432 to 95 and ranked first in the country in total offense (448.1 yards per game), scoring offense (38.7 points per game), and scoring defense (7.2 points per game). In the final AP and UPI Polls, Michigan was ranked No 3.

Highlights of the season included a 51–0 victory over Stanford in which three Michigan running backs rushed for over 100 yards. Michigan's 70–14 victory over Navy was the worst defeat in the history of the Naval Academy's football program. Michigan spent most of the season ranked No. 1 in the polls, but a 16–14 loss to Purdue in the ninth game of the season dropped the Wolverines out of the top spot. In the final game of the regular season, Michigan defeated Ohio State, 22–0, to win the Big Ten championship. The game marked the first time the Buckeyes had been held scoreless since 1964. In the 1977 Rose Bowl, Michigan lost to USC, 14–6, as the Wolverines completed only four passes and were held to 155 rushing yards.

On offense, senior running back Rob Lytle was selected as the team's most valuable player, finished third in voting for the Heisman Trophy, and led the Wolverines with 1,469 rushing yards and 16 touchdowns. Lytle finished the season as Michigan's all-time career rushing leader with 3,307 rushing yards gained from 1974 to 1976. Quarterback Rick Leach passed for 973 yards and 13 touchdowns and rushed for another 638 yards and 10 touchdowns. His 13 touchdown passes tied a team record set by Bob Chappuis in 1947. Harlan Huckleby added 912 rushing yards, and wing back Jim Smith caught 26 passes for 714 yards and six touchdowns.

Lytle, Smith, offensive right guard Mark Donahue, and offensive right tackle Bill Dufek were selected as first-team All-Americans. On defense, Calvin O'Neal started all 12 games at middle linebacker, led the team with 139 tackles, and was a consensus first-team All-American. Nine Michigan players were selected as first-team All-Big Ten Conference players. Twenty-one players from the 1976 team went on to play in the National Football League, and another (Rick Leach) was drafted by the Denver Broncos in the 1979 NFL draft, but opted instead to play Major League Baseball.

== Schedule ==
Date	Opponent	Rank	Site	TV	Result	Attendance
September 11	Wisconsin	No. 2	Michigan Stadium; Ann Arbor, MI		W 40–27	101,347
September 18	Stanford*	No. 1	Michigan Stadium; Ann Arbor, MI		W 51–0	103,741
September 25	Navy*	No. 1	Michigan Stadium; Ann Arbor, MI		W 70–14	101,040
October 2	Wake Forest*	No. 1	Michigan Stadium; Ann Arbor, MI		W 31–0	103,241
October 9	Michigan State	No. 1	Michigan Stadium; Ann Arbor, MI (rivalry)		W 42–10	104,211
October 16	at Northwestern	No. 1	Dyche Stadium; Evanston, IL (rivalry)		W 38–7	31,045
October 23	at Indiana	No. 1	Memorial Stadium; Bloomington, IN		W 35–0	39,385
October 30	Minnesota^{†}	No. 1	Michigan Stadium; Ann Arbor, MI (Little Brown Jug)	ABC	W 45–0	104,426
November 6	at Purdue	No. 1	Ross–Ade Stadium; West Lafayette, IN		L 14–16	57,205
November 13	Illinois	No. 4	Michigan Stadium; Ann Arbor, MI (rivalry)		W 38–7	104,107
November 20	at No. 8 Ohio State	No. 4	Ohio Stadium; Columbus, OH (The Game)	ABC	W 22–0	88,250
January 1, 1977	vs. No. 3 USC*	No. 2	Rose Bowl; Pasadena, CA (Rose Bowl)	NBC	L 6–14	106,182
*Non-conference game; ^{†}Homecoming; Rankings from AP Poll released prior to the game

== Season summary ==
=== Week 1: Wisconsin ===
Week 1: Wisconsin at Michigan

Team	1	2	3	4	Total
Wisconsin	10	7	0	0	17
• Michigan	23	7	0	0	30

- Date: September 11, 1976
- Location: Michigan Stadium, Ann Arbor, Michigan
- Game attendance: 101,337

Scoring summary
1	MICH	Safety on Morgan fumble out of end zone	MICH 2-0
1	MICH	Huckleby 56-yard run (Wood kick)	MICH 9-0
1	MICH	Huckleby 4-yard run (Wood kick)	MICH 16-0
1	MICH	J. Smith 12-yard pass from Leach (Wood kick)	MICH 23-0
2	WISC	Egloff 26-yard pass from Carroll (Lamla kick)	MICH 23-7
2	MICH	J. Smith 25-yard pass from Leach (Wood kick)	MICH 30-7
3/4	WISC	Lamla 42-yard field goal	MICH 30-10
3/4	MICH	Wood 36-yard field goal	MICH 33-10
3/4	WISC	Lamla 42-yard field goal	MICH 33-13
3/4	WISC	Canada 6-yard run (Lamla kick)	MICH 33-20
3/4	MICH	Huckleby 1-yard run (Wood kick)	MICH 40-20
3/4	WISC	Charles 7-yard pass from Carroll (Lamla kick)	MICH 40-27

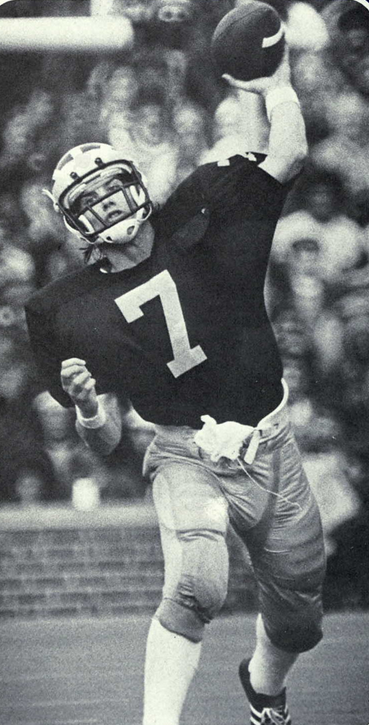
Rick Leach

Michigan opened the season on September 11, 1976, with a 40–27 victory over Wisconsin. Michigan scored two points on a safety on the second play from scrimmage as Wisconsin running back Mike Morgan fumbled the handoff on a reverse play and the ball rolled out of the end zone. Harlan Huckleby then extended the lead to 9-0 with a 56-yard touchdown run on Michigan's third play from scrimmage. Michigan led the game 23–0 at the end of the first quarter and held on for a 40–27 win.

Michigan's offense was led by tailback Harlan Huckleby who rushed for 131 yards and three touchdowns on 19 carries. Rick Leach completed six of eight passes for 105 yards and two touchdowns. Leach also rushed for 84 yards on nine carries. Wing back Jim Smith scored two touchdowns and netted 174 yards in the game, including gains on kickoff and punt returns, receptions, and reverse plays. Team captain Rob Lytle gained 76 yards on 16 attempts, but also fumbled three times. Mike Kenn and Gerry Szara were credited with leading an offensive line that "completely controlled the line of scrimmage."

Defensively, the game was a disappointment for Michigan. Wisconsin's 27 points was the most allowed by a Michigan team since 1969, and Wisconsin's 426 yards of offense was the most allowed by Michigan since before Bo Schembechler took over as head coach. After the game, Schembechler told the press: "Twenty seven points that's what we usually give up in the first half of the season. I wasn't happy with the movement, I wasn't happy with the pursuit, I wasn't happy with the tackling, I wasn't happy with the playing of the ball in the secondary and I wasn't happy with the heat we put on the passer."

In the AP Poll released after the game, Michigan was ranked #1 with Ohio State at #2. Michigan's move to #1 was aided by upsets of Alabama and Texas and a tie between Nebraska and LSU.

=== Week 2: Stanford ===
Week 2: Stanford at Michigan

Team	1	2	3	4	Total
Stanford	0	0	0	0	0
• Michigan	14	17	13	7	51

- Date: September 18, 1976
- Location: Michigan Stadium, Ann Arbor, Michigan
- Game attendance: 103,741

Scoring summary
1	MICH	Huckleby 8-yard run (Wood kick)	MICH 7-0
1	MICH	Leach 4-yard run (Wood kick)	MICH 14-0
2	MICH	Lytle 16-yard run (Wood kick)	MICH 21-0
2	MICH	Wood 49-yard field goal	MICH 24-0
2	MICH	Russell Davis 16-yard run (Wood kick)	MICH 31-0
3	MICH	Lytle 14-yard run (Wood kick)	MICH 38-0
3	MICH	G. Johnson 3-yard pass from Leach (kick failed)	MICH 44-0
4	MICH	R. Davis 85-yard run (Wood kick)	MICH 51-0

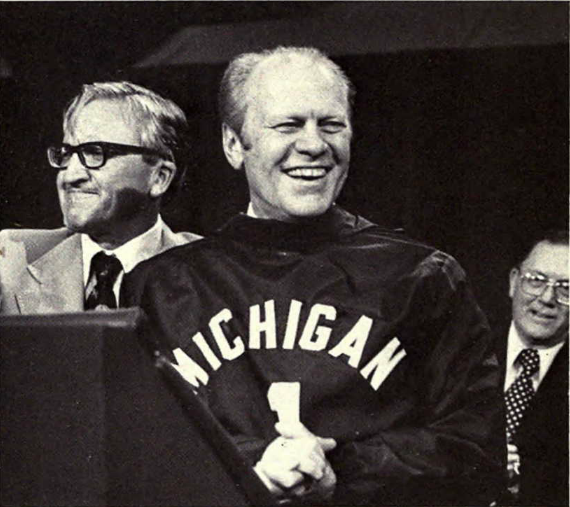
President Ford receives a football jersey during visit to campus in September 1976

On September 18, 1976, Michigan played Stanford at Michigan Stadium. Michigan and Stanford had played to a 19–19 tie in 1975, and the Associated Press picked the rematch as its "Upset Special of the Week", predicting a Stanford win by a 24–20 score. Instead, Michigan defeated Stanford by a score of 51–0.

Three Michigan running backs rushed for at least 100 yards in the game. Harlan Huckleby led the group with 160 yards and a touchdown on 15 carries. Russell Davis added 115 yards and two touchdowns on seven carries, including an 85-yard touchdown run in the fourth quarter. Rob Lytle had 101 yards and two touchdowns on 19 carries. Rick Leach completed only two of eight passes for 15 yards, but added 70 rushing yards and a touchdown on seven carries. One of Leach's completions went three yards to tight end Gene Johnson for a touchdown in the third quarter. In total, the Wolverines gained 531 rushing yards against the Cardinal. On defense, Michigan intercepted three Stanford passes. Calvin O'Neal led the team with 11 total tackles. Place-kicker Bob Wood converted on six of seven extra point attempts and kicked a 49-yard field goal in the second quarter. The game marked the first time a Stanford team had been shut out since 1967.

On the Wednesday before the Stanford game, the #1-ranked Michigan team received a visit from President Gerald Ford. Ford, who was the most valuable player of the 1934 Michigan Wolverines football team, spent time with team during a practice session and later ate with the team. Ford noted, "They're an awful lot bigger today. Not only are they bigger but they're better." Split end Curt Stephenson later recalled the dinner:

"A tray appeared with a big New York steak in front of the President. . . . What happened next is kind of a blur. President Ford started to choke and the secret service started to circle the table. I don't know why, but in one immediate action, I reached back and gave him a good whack on the back. A hunk of beef flew out and across the table. The President turned to me and said, 'Thanks'. . . . From that point on, there were about six agents who were giving me eagle eyes."

Later that day, Ford formally opened his reelection campaign with a speech to a boisterous crowd of 14,000 at Crisler Arena.

=== Week 3: Navy ===
Week 3: Navy at Michigan

Team	1	2	3	4	Total
Navy	7	7	0	0	14
• Michigan	7	14	28	21	70

- Date: September 25, 1976
- Location: Michigan Stadium, Ann Arbor, Michigan
- Game attendance: 101,040

Scoring summary
1	NAVY	Kurowski 20-yard run (Tata kick)	NAVY 7-0
1	MICH	Lytle 3-yard run (Wood kick)	MICH 7-7
2	MICH	Safety, Ohanian tackled by Greer in end zone	MICH 9-7
2	MICH	Wood 51-yard field goal	MICH 12-7
2	NAVY	Kiawinski 1-yard run (Tata kick)	NAVY 14-12
2	MICH	Safety punt blocked out of end zone	MICH 14-14
2	MICH	J. Smith 31-yard pass from Leach (Wood kick)	MICH 21-14
3	MICH	Leach 6-yard run (Wood kick)	MICH 28-14
3	MICH	O'Neal 29-yard interception return (Wood kick)	MICH 35-14
3	MICH	Leach 7-yard run (Wood kick)	MICH 42-14
3	MICH	G. Johnson 5-yard pass from Leach (Wood kick)	MICH 49-14
4	MICH	S. Johnson 4-yard run (Wood kick)	MICH 56-14
4	MICH	K. King 3-yard run (Wood kick)	MICH 63-14
4	MICH	L. Reid 2-yard run (Wood kick)	MICH 70-14

On September 25, 1976, Michigan faced Navy at Michigan Stadium. Two days before the game, the schools' most famous alumni (Gerald Ford of Michigan and Jimmy Carter of the Naval Academy) faced off in a presidential debate. The Associated Press reported that a survey of registered voters gave Ford a slight edge over Carter in the debate, but noted that things were "not expected to be that close" when the two schools met on the football field. In fact, Michigan defeated Navy by a 70-14 score. The game marked the worst defeat in the history of the Naval Academy's football program. The point total was also the highest by a Michigan team since an 85-0 win over the University of Chicago in 1939.

Navy took an early lead on a touchdown by quarterback John Kurowski and led 14-12 halfway through the second quarter. Michigan tied the score with its second safety of the second quarter and outscored 49–0 in the second half to put the game out of reach.

Quarterback Rick Leach completed 8 of 12 passes for 179 yards and led the scoring with two rushing touchdowns and two passing touchdowns. A total of nine players scored for the Wolverines. On offense, touchdowns were scored by Leach, Rob Lytle, Lawrence Reid, Kevin King, Stacy Johnson, Jim Smith, and Gene Johnson. Middle linebacker Calvin O'Neal also scored a touchdown on a 29-yard return after intercepting a Navy pass. Place-kicker Bob Wood tied a Michigan record with a 41-yard field goal, his third of the season, and converted all nine extra point kicks. Jim Smith caught four passes for 147 yards and added another 55 yards on kickoff and punt returns. Harlan Huckleby rushed for 79 yards on 11 carries but did not score and left the game early after sustaining a shoulder injury.

After the game, Bo Schembechler denied running up the score, having used 53 players in the game. Schembechler told the press told the press that his squad was not a great team and that he would prefer not to be ranked #1.

=== Week 4: Wake Forest ===
Week 4: Wake Forest at Michigan

Team	1	2	3	4	Total
Wake Forest	0	0	0	0	0
• Michigan	7	10	7	7	31

- Date: October 2, 1976
- Location: Michigan Stadium, Ann Arbor, Michigan
- Game attendance: 103,241

Scoring summary
1	MICH	Leach 3-yard run (Wood kick)	Michigan 7-0
2	MICH	Lytle 9-yard run (Wood kick)	Michigan 14-0
2	MICH	Wood 23-yard field goal	Michigan 17-0
3	MICH	Huckleby 13-yard run (Wood kick)	Michigan 24-0
4	MICH	Lytle 25-yard run (Wood kick)	Michigan 31-0

On October 2, 1976, Michigan faced the Wake Forest Demon Deacons in the team's fourth consecutive home game at Michigan Stadium. In the week before the game, Wake Forest head coach Chuck Mills noted that he had heard that Bear Bryant endorsed Gerald Ford and joked, "I'm withholding my endorsement until after the Michigan game to see what kind of hosts they are." The Wolverines shut out the Demon Deacons by a score of 31–0.

Rob Lytle rushed for 110 yards and two touchdowns on 14 carries and also caught two passes for 21 yards. With the total, Lytle moved past Tom Harmon for fourth place on Michigan's all-time career rushing list. Harlan Huckleby added 89 yards, and quarterback Rick Leach completed only three of 14 passes and threw three interceptions. Commenting on Leach's passing, one sportswriter noted: "[W]hen the Wolverines are rolling up a shutout, and 340 yards rushing, hardly anybody notices the passing. Maybe that's a good thing. ... [Leach] was wild high, and wild low, but in games like these it really doesn't matter." Bo Schembechler told the press after the game: "You people like passing and there it is. That's how we keep the score down."

=== Week 5: Michigan State ===
Week 5: Michigan State at Michigan

Team	1	2	3	4	Total
Michigan State	10	0	0	0	10
• Michigan	14	14	7	7	42

- Date: October 9, 1976
- Location: Michigan Stadium, Ann Arbor, Michigan
- Game attendance: 104,211

Scoring summary
1	MSU	Nielsen 24-yard field goal	MSU 3-0
1	MICH	Lytle 75-yard run (Wood kick)	MICH 7-3
1	MICH	Huckleby 38-yard run (Wood kick)	MICH 14-3
1	MSU	Brammer 10-yard pass from E. Smith (Nielsen kick)	MICH 14-10
2	MICH	Leach 3-yard run (Wood kick)	MICH 21-10
2	MICH	Huckleby 1-yard run (Wood kick)	MICH 28-10
3	MICH	Huckleby 2-yard run (Wood kick)	MICH 35-10
4	MICH	Zuver 60-yard interception return (Wood kick)	MICH 42-10

On October 9, 1976, Michigan played its cross-state rival Michigan State in the annual battle for the Paul Bunyan Trophy. The Wolverines had won six straight games with the last victory for the Spartans dating back to 1969. Michigan extended the streak to seven games with a 42–10 victory at Michigan Stadium. Michigan's 42 points was the most it had scored against Michigan State since 1947.

Fullback Rob Lytle rushed for 180 yards on 10 carries, including a 45-yard gain on a fake punt and a 75-yard touchdown run in the first quarter. After the game, Bo Schembechler said of Lytle, "If that guy isn't an All-American, I don't know who is." Lytle added, "All backs like to break away on a long one like that. It was the longest run I've had at Michigan. In fact, I think this was my biggest day ever." Harlan Huckleby rushed for 126 yards and three touchdowns on 23 carries. Russell Davis added 91 yards on 13 carries. In all, the Wolverines rushed for 442 yards on 62 carries against the Spartans. Quarterback Rick Leach completed five of seven passes for 93 yards and rushed for 36 yards on 11 carries. Wolfman Jerry Zuver scored Michigan's final touchdown on a 60-yard interception return in the fourth quarter.

In the AP Poll released on the Monday after the game, Michigan retained its #1 ranking with 57 out of 60 first-place votes and 1,194 points out of a possible 1,200 points. Pittsburgh was ranked #2 with the remaining three first-place votes.

=== Week 6: at Northwestern ===
Week 6: Michigan at Northwestern

Team	1	2	3	4	Total
• Michigan	3	28	0	7	38
Northwestern	0	0	0	7	7

- Date: October 16, 1976
- Location: Dyche Stadium, Evanston, Illinois
- Game attendance: 31,045

Scoring summary
1	MSU	Wood 33-yard field goal	MICH 3-0
2	MICH	Smith 52-yard pass from Leach (Wood kick)	MICH 10-0
2	MICH	Lytle 18-yard run (Wood kick)	MICH 17-0
2	MICH	Leach 7-yard run (Wood kick)	MICH 24-0
2	MICH	Lytle 1-yard run (Wood kick)	MICH 31-0
4	MICH	Huckleby 12-yard run (Wood kick)	MICH 38-0
4	NU	Yelvington 4-yard pass from Dean (Paulus kick)	MICH 38-7

On October 16, 1976, Michigan faced Northwestern for its first game on the road. Playing at Dyche Stadium, the Wolverines scored 28 points in the second quarter, compiled 346 yard of total offense in the first half, and led 31-0 at halftime. Michigan applied the brakes in the second half, and both teams scored single touchdowns in the fourth quarter. Michigan won by a final score of 38–7.

Rob Lytle, who moved from fullback to tailback in the game, rushed for 172 yards and two touchdowns on 18 carries. With his performance against Northwestern, Lytle moved past Ron Johnson and into third place on Michigan's all-time rushing yardage list. Harlan Huckleby gained 80 yards and scored a touchdown on 17 carries, while Russell Davis rushed for 58 yards on 13 carries. Rick Leach completed only three of seven passes and threw two interceptions. One of Leach's passes went 57 yards for a touchdown to Jim Smith. Bob Wood kicked a field goal in the first quarter and converted on all four extra point attempts.

Michigan remained ranked #1 in both polls after its victory over Northwestern. It captured 40 out of 42 first place votes from the UPI Board of Coaches.

=== Week 7: at Indiana ===
Week 7: Michigan at Indiana

Team	1	2	3	4	Total
• Michigan	7	14	14	0	35
Indiana	0	0	0	0	0

- Date: October 23, 1976
- Location: Memorial Stadium, Bloomington, Indiana
- Game attendance: 39,385

For its seventh game of the year, Michigan defeated Indiana by a 35-0 score in cold, wet conditions at Bloomington. Rick Leach completed all four of his passes for 102 yards, including a nine-yard touchdown pass to Gene Johnson in the second quarter and a 15-yard touchdown pass to Russell Davis and the third period. Rob Lytle rushed for 175 yards on 25 carries and scored touchdowns on runs of 14 yards and one yard. Russell Davis also rushed for 69 yards and a touchdown, while Harlan Huckleby rushed for 67 yards, including a one-yard touchdown run in the fourth quarter.

=== Week 8: Minnesota ===
Week 8: Minnesota at Michigan

Team	1	2	3	4	Total
Minnesota	0	0	0	0	0
• Michigan	7	14	17	7	45

- Date: October 30, 1976
- Location: Michigan Stadium, Ann Arbor, Michigan
- Game attendance: 104,426
- Referee: Gene Calhoun (Big Ten)
- TV announcers (ABC): Keith Jackson, Bud Wilkinson

Scoring summary
1	MICH	Huckleby 6-yard run (Wood kick)	MICH 7-0
2	MICH	Lytle 13-yard pass from Leach (Wood kick)	MICH 14-0
2	MICH	Leach 28-yard run (Wood kick)	MICH 21-0
3	MICH	J. Smith 22-yard pass from Leach (Wood kick)	MICH 28-0
3	MICH	Wood 46-yard field goal	MICH 31-0
3	MICH	Leach 6-yard run (Wood kick)	MICH 38-0
4	MICH	Lytle 2-yard run (Wood kick)	MICH 45-0

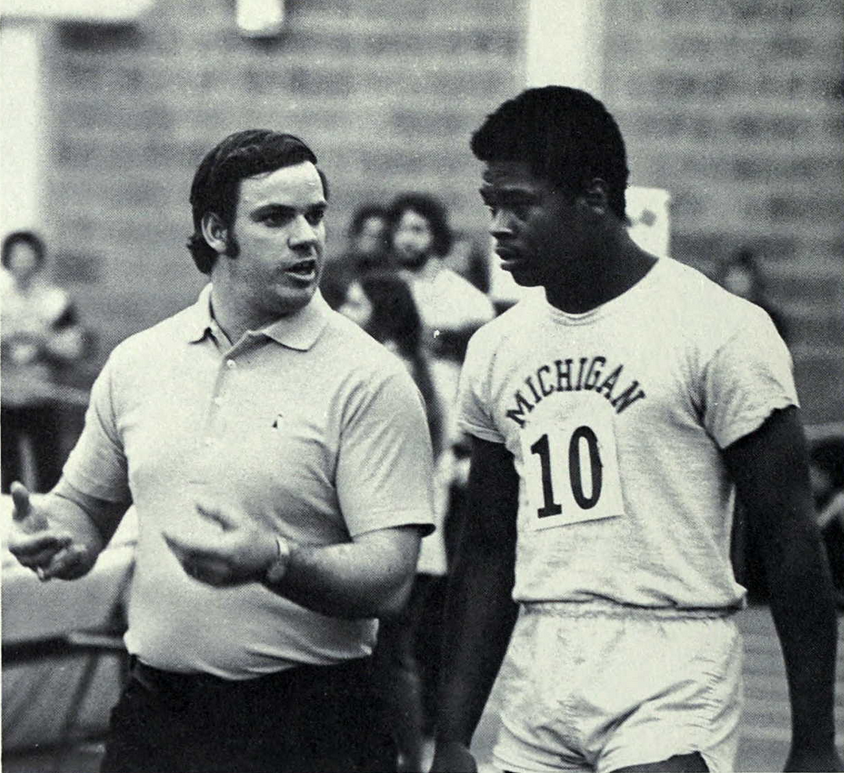
Russell Davis with track coach Jack Harvey

On October 30, 1976, Michigan defeated Minnesota 45-0 in the annual battle for the Little Brown Jug. The game was played in steady rain and cold conditions before a homecoming crowd of 104,426, at that time the fifth largest crowd to watch a game at Michigan Stadium.

Quarterback Rick Leach accounted for four touchdowns, two rushing and two passing. He rushed for a career-high 114 yards on 10 carries, including a 28-yard touchdown run in the second quarter and a six-yard touchdown run in the third quarter. Leach also completed all four of his passes for 40 passing yards, including a 13-yard touchdown pass to Rob Lytle in the second quarter and a 22-yard touchdown pass to Jim Smith in the third quarter. Lytle alternated at the tailback and fullback positions and rushed for 129 rushing yards (107 in the first half), including a two-yard touchdown run in the fourth quarter. Harlan Huckleby gained 55 yards on 12 carries, including a six-yard touchdown run on an option pitch from Leach in the first quarter. In the Toledo Blade, John Hannen wrote after the game that "Leach handles the option with the light fingers of a pick pocket" and opined that Michigan's combination of Lytle, Huckleby, Smith and Davis "may be the fastest backfield in collegiate history." Place-kicker Bob Wood also kicked a 46-yard field goal in the third quarter and converted on all six extra point kicks.

Defensively, Michigan held Minnesota to 80 rushing yards. Minnesota quarterback Tony Dungy completed 12 of 20 passes for 85 yards, but Dwight Hicks intercepted a Dungy pass in the fourth quarter and returned it 51 yards. Freshman Ron Simpkins intercepted another Dungy pass with a minute left in the game.

After the game, Bo Schembechler told the press, "If we can keep improving, we will be very difficult to beat. We are playing with more confidence now and our defense is getting better. It seems to be improving every week." Schembechler also praised Lytle: "There is no back in the United States of America who does more for his team than Rob Lytle does for Michigan."

With a convincing victory over Minnesota, Michigan, solidified its #1 ranking. The Wolverines received 40 of 41 first place votes from the UPI Board of Coaches.

=== Week 9: at Purdue ===
Week 9: Michigan at Purdue

Team	1	2	3	4	Total
Michigan	7	0	7	0	14
• Purdue	7	6	0	3	16

- Date: November 6, 1976
- Location: Ross–Ade Stadium, West Lafayette, Indiana
- Game attendance: 57,205

Scoring summary
1	MICH	Leach 8-yard run (Wood kick)	MICH 7-0
1	PUR	Dierking 4-yard run (Supan kick)	TIED 7-7
2	PUR	Dierking 25-yard run (kick failed)	PUR 13-7
3	MICH	J. Smith 64-yard pass from Leach (Wood kick)	MICH 14-13
4	PUR	Supan 23-yard field goal	PUR 16-14

Michigan traveled to West Lafayette, Indiana, to play Purdue on November 6, 1976. Michigan was heavily favored and had not lost a game to Purdue since 1966. The Boilermakers came into the game with a 3–4 record, but proceeded to stun the college football world with a 16-14 upset victory over the Wolverines. It was the first time Michigan had lost to a Big Ten Conference team other than Ohio State since its loss to Michigan State in 1969.

Michigan took a 7–0 lead in the first quarter on an eight-yard touchdown run by Rick Leach. Leach's score was set up by linebacker Jerry Vogele's recovery of a fumble at the Michigan 42-yard line. Purdue's Scott Dierking responded with two touchdown runs, one each in the first and second quarters. Purdue held a 13–7 lead at halftime. Early in the third quarter, Michigan drove to Purdue's one-yard line, but Leach fumbled and the ball was turned over to Purdue. Later in the third quarter, Leach threw a 64-yard touchdown pass to Jim Smith, and Bob Wood kicked the extra point to give Michigan a 14–13 lead. On the next drive, Jerry Zuver intercepted a pass to stop a Purdue drive at Michigan's 22-yard line. However, Rob Lytle fumbled on the next drive, and Purdue recovered the ball at its own 29-yard line. Purdue drove to the Michigan six-yard line. While Michigan's defense held, Rock Supan kicked a field goal on fourth down with four minutes remaining in the game. With nine second left in the game, Bob Wood's attempt at a 37-yard field goal went wide to the left.

Rob Lytle rushed for 153 yards in the game to pass Gordon Bell at the number two position on Michigan's career rushing yardage list. Purdue rushed for 251 yards in the game, including 162 yards by Dierking. After the game, Bo Schembechler told reporters, "It hurts a lot. We don't accept it. . . . We shouldn't accept it . . . because we should have won. No defeat is good. we got down there at the end and we should have scored. But when you depend on winning on a forward pass or a field goal, you're in trouble."

In a post-game account, the UPI dubbed Purdue the "Spoilermakers", noting that Purdue had upset a #1 ranked Notre Dame team in 1974 before upsetting #1 ranked Michigan.

Four days before the Wolverines lost to Purdue, the team's most famous alumnus lost the 1976 presidential election to Jimmy Carter. After losing a close election, Ford harkened back to his days as a football player, "We lost, in the last quarter."

=== Week 10: Illinois ===
Week 10: Illinois at Michigan

Team	1	2	3	4	Total
Illinois	7	0	0	0	7
• Michigan	7	14	14	3	38

- Date: November 13, 1976
- Location: Michigan Stadium, Ann Arbor, Michigan
- Game attendance: 104,107

Scoring summary
1		MICH	Leach 11-yard run (Wood kick)	MICH 7-0
1		ILL	Phillips 2-yard run (Beaver kick)	TIE 7-7
2		MICH	Lytle 5-yard pass from Leach (Wood kick)	MICH 14-7
2		MICH	Schmerge 7-yard pass from Leach (Wood kick)	MICH 21-7
3		MICH	Lytle 13-yard run (Wood kick)	MICH 28-7
3		MICH	Lytle 3-yard run (Wood kick)	MICH 35-7
4	12:20	MICH	Wood 37-yard field goal	MICH 38-7

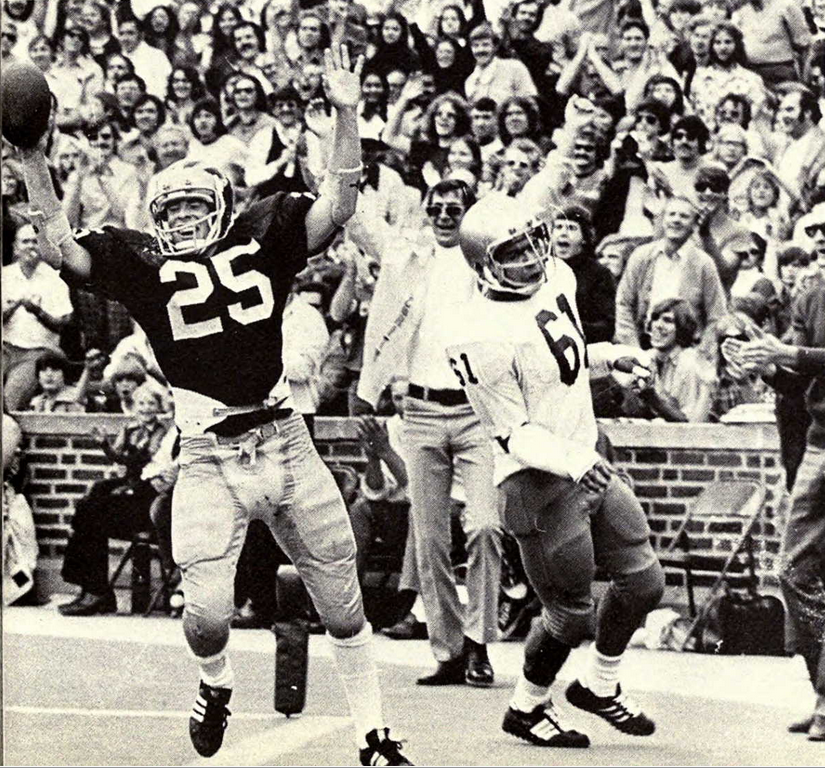
Rob Lytle

After the loss to Purdue, Michigan returned to Ann Arbor and played Illinois on November 13, 1976. Prior to the game, Associated Press writer Fred Rothenberg noted that Illinois was in the unenviable position of playing Michigan on the heels of the Purdue game. Rothenberg wrote: "The University of Michigan and its most famous alumnus both lost their No. 1 positions last week. President Ford immediately went on vacation; the Wolverines went back to work. Pity poor Illinois." Michigan defeated the Illini by a score of 38–7.

Rob Lytle rushed for 89 yards on 21 carries and scored three touchdowns, a five-yard touchdown reception in the second quarter and a pair of touchdown runs in the third quarter. With his rushing yards against Illinois, Lytle became Michigan's all-time career rushing leader. Lytle totaled 3,085 career rushing yards after the Illinois game, surpassing Billy Taylor's school record by 13 yards.

Rick Leach rushed for 65 yards and completed 9 of 15 passes for 151 yards and two touchdowns. With Illinois putting seven or eight men on the line at times, no Michigan player was able to rush for 100 yards in the game. Accordingly, Michigan opened up the passing attack. Bo Schembechler said after the game, "When they put that many people on the line of scrimmage, you have to throw the ball over their heads." In addition to the touchdown pass to Lytle, Leach connected with tight end Mark Shmerge in the second quarter for a seven-yard touchdown pass. Jim Smith also caught six passes for 127 yards. Leach's two touchdown passes gave him 13 for the season, tying the Michigan record set in 1947 by Bob Chappuis. After the game, Illinois coach Bob Blackman said, "Leach is not just a good quarterback, he is a great quarterback. We knew he could run the option, but he can also pass the ball."

On defense, Michigan held Illinois to 101 rushing yards and 79 passing yards. Calvin O'Neal also intercepted a Kurt Steger pass late in the second quarter to set up Michigan's third touchdown of the half. Dom Tedesco also intercepted a Steger pass to set up Michigan's fifth touchdown in the third quarter. Tackle Greg Morton led the team with 15 tackles in the game.

Michigan concluded its home schedule with an average of 103,159 spectators per game, setting a new record for college football attendance. The prior record had been set by Michigan in 1975 with an average attendance of 98,449.

=== Week 11: at Ohio State ===
Week 11: Michigan at Ohio State

Team	1	2	3	4	Total
• Michigan	0	0	15	7	22
'Ohio State'	0	0	0	0	0

- Date: November 20, 1976
- Location: Ohio Stadium, Columbus, Ohio
- Game attendance: 88,250

Scoring summary
3		MICH	Davis 3-yard run (Wood kick)	MICH 7-0
3		MICH	Davis 3-yard run (Zuver run)	MICH 15-0
4	6:47	MICH	Lytle 3-yard run (Wood kick)	MICH 22-0

In the final game of the regular season, Michigan (ranked #4) traveled to Columbus, Ohio, for its annual rivalry game with Ohio State (ranked #8). Each team entered the game with one loss on its record, but Ohio State was undefeated in conference play. For the eighth time in nine years, the winner of the game would become the Big Ten Conference champion and earn the conference's berth in the Rose Bowl. The Wolverines had not beaten the Buckeyes since 1971, and Bo Schembechler had not won a game in Ohio Stadium. Stories ran about Schembechler being jinxed or hexed at Ohio Stadium, but Schembechler rejected the notion: "I don't look at it as a jinx." On learning that his team was favored by 5-1/2 points, Schembechler said, "Being the favorite doesn't put any points on the board."

Michigan defeated Ohio State by a 22-0 score. The game drew a record crowd of 88,250 to Ohio Stadium and was broadcast to a national television audience. The game was the worst home loss for Ohio State since 1967, and it snapped Ohio State's streak of 122 games without being shut out. The last time an Ohio State team had been shut out was Michigan's 10-0 victory in 1964.

After a scoreless first half, Russell Davis scored two touchdowns for Michigan in the third quarter. Davis tallied 83 yards on 24 carries. After Davis's second touchdown, holder Jerry Zuver ran for a two-point conversion. Rob Lytle rushed for 165 yards on 29 carries, including a touchdown in the fourth quarter. Rick Leach completed none of his six passes and threw an interception. Bob Wood converted on both of his extra point kicks.

On defense, the Wolverines became the first team to hold the Buckeyes scoreless since 1964. They held Ohio State to 173 yards of total offense, including 101 rushing yards and only five pass receptions. Defensive tackle Greg Morton led the team with 14 tackles, and Jim Pickens and Jerry Zuver each had an interception. Late in the second quarter, with the game still scoreless, Ohio State drove the ball to the Michigan 10-yard line when Pickens intercepted a pass in the end zone. After the game, Woody Hayes cited Pickens' interception as a turning point: "The interception at the end of the first half was a costly error on our part. It was my call all the way, and it was just a bad call. If we had scored then, it might have affected the second half outcome."

Michigan ended the season ranked first in the country in total offense (448.1 yards per game), scoring offense (38.7 points per game), and scoring defense (7.2 points per game).

=== Rose Bowl ===
#3 Michigan Wolverines (10–1) vs. #2 USC Trojans (10–1)

Quarter	1	2	3	4	Total
Michigan	0	6	0	0	6
USC	0	7	0	7	14

at Rose Bowl • Pasadena, California

- Date: January 1, 1977
- Game attendance: 106,182
- TV announcers (NBC): Curt Gowdy and Don Meredith

Game information

Michigan

- Rick Leach
  4/12, 76 Yds
- Rob Lytle
  18 Rush, 67 Yds, TD
- Jim Smith
  2 Rec, 52 Yds

USC

- Vince Evans
  14/20, 181 Yds, INT
- Charles White
  32 Rush, 114 Yds, TD
- Shelton Diggs
  8 Rec, 98 Yds

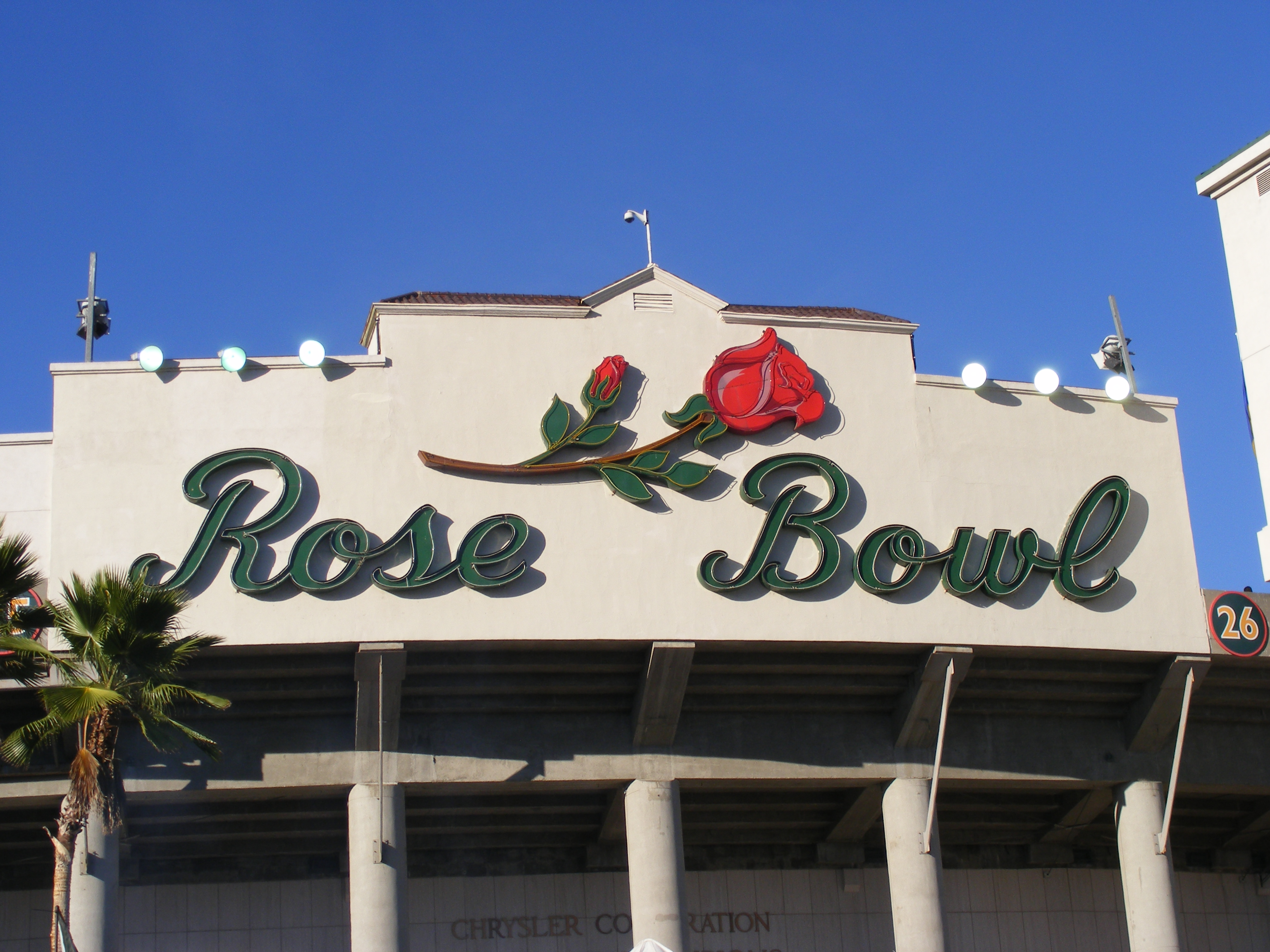
The Rose Bowl

With its victory over Ohio State, Michigan advanced to play the USC Trojans in the 1977 Rose Bowl on New Year's Day. Michigan came into the game ranked #2 in the AP Poll and #3 in the UPI coaches poll. USC was ranked #3 by the AP and #2 by the UPI. Michigan lost to the Trojans, 14-6.

In the first quarter, neither team scored, and USC's Heisman Trophy runner-up Ricky Bell was injured and unable to return to the game. Michigan took a 6–0 lead on a one-yard touchdown run by Rob Lytle in the second quarter, but Bob Wood's extra point kick was blocked. The Trojans moved down field on the next drive, and quarterback Vince Evans put USC in the lead on a one-yard touchdown run with a minute-and-a-half left in the first half. Neither team scored in the third quarter, and freshman tailback Charles White scored USC's second touchdown with three minutes left in the game. White rushed for 122 yards in the game. Michigan's offense was held to 155 rushing yards and 76 passing yards. Rob Lytle gained 67 yards on 18 carries, and Russell Davis was limited to 39 yards on 10 carries. Rick Leach completed only 4 of 12 passes and was held to 34 rushing yards on 13 carries.

Press coverage of the game focused on Michigan's conservative, run-oriented offense and USC's more versatile attack. Los Angeles Times columnist Jim Murray wrote: "Of course, it's possible Michigan doesn't know how to catch a pass. They never throw any, so may not know it's legal. The way they play the game you could hold it in a cave." An Associated Press story noted: "It was the same old story. The Big Ten's Rose Bowl representative, a stick-to-the-ground team ... just couldn't cope with the versatility of its Pacific-8 Conference opponent." Another writer noted that the Rose Bowl had become an annual "wake" for the Big 10: "It is rapidly becoming an annual event. Only the corpses are different."

Scoring summary

Quarter	Time	Drive			Team	Scoring information	Score	
Quarter	Time	Plays	Yards	TOP	Team	Scoring information	MICH	USC
1					Michigan	Lytle 1-yard touchdown run, Wood kick no good (blocked)	6	0
2	1:28				USC	Evans 1-yard touchdown run, Walker kick good	6	7
4					USC	White 7-yard touchdown run, Walker kick good	6	14
"TOP" = time of possession. For other American football terms, see Glossary of American football.							6	14

=== Post-season ===
Several Michigan players, led by Rob Lytle, received post-season honors and awards. Lytle, called "the greatest back I ever coached" by Bo Schembechler, was selected as a first-team All-American by both the AP, UPI, Walter Camp Foundation, American Football Coaches Association (AFCA), Football News, and College Football News. In balloting for the Heisman Trophy, Lytle finished third with 35 first-place votes and 413 points, trailing Tony Dorsett (701 first-place votes, 2,357 points) and Ricky Bell (73 first-place votes, 1,346 points). Lytle also won the 1976 Wiseman Trophy, presented each year to person selected as "the nation's best football player."

Other Michigan players selected as All-Americans were Calvin O'Neal (UPI first team, Walter Camp Foundation first team, Sporting News first team, College Football News first team, AP second team), Jim Smith (AP first team, FWAA first team [returner], Sporting News first team, Football News first team, UPI second team), Mark Donahue (UPI first team, NEA first team, FWAA first team, Football News first team, Walter Camp Foundation first team), and Bill Dufek (College Football News first team).

Nine Michigan players were selected for first-team All-Big Ten Conference honors. The Associated Press selected six offensive players (Jim Smith, Bill Dufek, Mark Donahue, Walt Downing, Rick Leach, and Rob Lytle) and two defensive players (Greg Morton Calvin O'Neal). The UPI selected the same eight players plus defensive end John Anderson.

== Roster ==
1976 Michigan Wolverines football team roster
Players
Coaches
Offense

Pos.	#	Name	Class
FB	33	Russell Davis	So
RB	25	Harlan Huckleby	So
QB	7	Rick Leach	So
FB	41	Rob Lytle	Sr
WR	85	Curt Stephenson	Jr

Defense

Pos.	#	Name	Class
LB	86	John Anderson	Jr
W	17	Dwight Hicks	Jr
CB	10	Derek Howard	Jr
DT	93	William Jackson	So
DB	16	Mike Jolly	Fr

Special teams

Pos.	#	Name	Class

Head coach

- Bo Schembechler

Coordinators/assistant coaches

Legend

- (C) Team captain
- (S) Suspended
- (I) Ineligible
- Injured
- Redshirt

Roster

== Players ==
=== Offense ===
- A. Phillip Andrews, FB, Jr., Brooklyn, New York
- Greg Bartnick, OG, Jr., Detroit
- John Ceddia, QB, Jr., Cincinnati
- Ralph Clayton, WB, Fr., Detroit
- Russell Davis, FB, So., Woodbridge, Virginia – started 3 games at fullback
- Mark Donahue, OG, Jr., Oak Lawn, Illinois – started 7 games at right guard, 5 games at left guard
- Walt Downing, C, Jr., Coatesville, Pennsylvania – started all 12 games at center
- Bill Dufek, OT, Jr., East Grand Rapids, Michigan – started all 12 games at right tackle
- Jim Hackett, C, Sr., London, Ohio
- Mike Harden, SE, Fr., Detroit
- Harlan Huckleby, TB, So., Detroit – started 9 games at tailback
- Gene Johnson, TE, So., Flint, Michigan – started all 12 games at tight end
- Stacy Johnson, QB, So., Camden, New Jersey
- Mike Kenn, OT, Jr., Evanston, Illinois – started all 12 games at left tackle
- Kevin King, FB, Jr., Oak Lawn, Illinois
- Rick Leach, QB, So., Flint, Michigan – started all 12 games at quarterback
- Kirk Lewis, OG, Sr., Garden City, Michigan – started 1 game at right guard
- Rob Lytle, FB/TB, Sr., Fremont, Ohio – started 9 games at fullback, 3 games at tailback
- Doug Marsh, TE, Fr., Akron, Ohio
- Steve Nauta, C, Jr., Norristown, Pennsylvania
- Max Richardson, WB, Jr., Fort Wayne, Indiana
- Mark Schmerge, TE, So., Cincinnati
- Jim Smith, WB, Sr., Blue Island, Illinois – started all 12 games at wing back
- Curt Stephenson, SE, Jr., La Jolla, California – started all 12 games at split end
- Gerry Szara, OG, Jr., Oak Lawn, Illinois – started 7 games at left guard, 4 games at right guard
- Richard A. White, SE, Jr., Cincinnati, Ohio
- Bob Wood, PK, Sr., London, Ohio

=== Defense ===
- John Anderson, DE, Jr., Waukesha, WI - started 10 games at defensive end
- Steve Anderson, MG, Jr., Toledo, Ohio
- Jim Bolden, DB, Sr., Akron, Ohio – started 12 games at weak-side cornerback
- Mark DeSantis, DE, So., Harper Woods, Michigan
- Jon Giesler, DT, So., Woodville, Ohio
- Chris Godfrey, DT, Fr., Detroit
- Steve Graves, MG, So., Cleveland– started 3 games at middle guard
- Curtis Greer, DT, So., Detroit
- John Hennessy, DT, Sr., Chicago – started 12 games at defensive tackle
- Dwight Hicks, S, Jr., Pennsauken, New Jersey – started 7 games at safety
- Derek Howard, Wolf, Jr., Hamilton, Ohio – started 5 games at strong-side cornerback, 1 game at wolfman
- William Jackson, DT, So., Richmond, Virginia
- Mike Jolly, DB, Fr., Melvindale, Michigan
- Bob Lang, MG, Sr., Chicago – started 9 games at middle guard
- Rex Mackall, LB, Jr., Berea, Ohio – started 1 game at defensive end
- Jerry Meter, LB, So., Birmingham, Michigan – started 4 games at middle linebacker
- Greg Morton, DT, Sr., Akron, Ohio- started 12 games at defensive tackle
- Calvin O'Neal, LB, Sr., Saginaw, Michigan – started 12 games at middle linebacker
- Mel Owens, LB, Fr., Dekalb, Illinois
- Robert Patek, Wolf, So., Farmington Hills, Michigan
- Jim Pickens, DB, Jr., Sylvania, Ohio – started 7 games at strong-side cornerback, 5 games at safety
- Tom Seabron, DE, So., Detroit - started 2 games at defensive end
- Ron Simpkins, LB, Fr., Detroit
- Roger Szafranski, MG, Sr., Bay City, Michigan
- Dominic Tedesco, DE, Jr., Riverside, Illinois – started 11 games at defensive end
- Jerry Vogele, LB, Sr., Cincinnati– started 8 games at middle linebacker
- Jerry Zuver, Wolf, Sr., Archbold, Ohio – started 11 games at wolfman

=== Awards ===
- All-Americans: Rob Lytle, Calvin O'Neal, Jim Smith, Mark Donahue
- All-Conference: Jim Smith, Greg Morton, Calvin O'Neal, Bill Dufek, Mark Donahue, Walt Downing, Rick Leach, Rob Lytle, John Anderson
- Most Valuable Player: Rob Lytle
- Meyer Morton Award: Greg Morton
- John Maulbetsch Award: Rick Leach
- Frederick Matthei Award: John Anderson
- Arthur Robinson Scholarship Award: Kirk Lewis

=== NFL ===
Twenty-one of the players from the 1976 Michigan team went on to play in the National Football League. They are John Anderson (Green Bay Packers, 1978–1989), Ralph Clayton (St. Louis Cardinals, 1981), Russell Davis (Pittsburgh Steelers, 1980–1983), Walt Downing (San Francisco 49ers, 1978–1983), Jon Giesler (Miami Dolphins, 1979–1988), Chris Godfrey (New York Jets, 1980; New York Giants, 1984–1987; Seattle Seahawks, 1988); Curtis Greer (St. Louis Cardinals, 1980–1987), Mike Harden (Denver Broncos, 1980–1988; Los Angeles Raiders, 1989–1990); John Hennessy (New York Jets, 1977–1979), Dwight Hicks (San Francisco 49ers, 1979–1985, Indianapolis Colts, 1986), Harlan Huckleby (Green Bay Packers, 1980–1985), Mike Jolly (Green Bay Packers, 1980–1983), Mike Kenn (Atlanta Falcons, 1978–1994), Rob Lytle (Denver Broncos, 1977–1983), Doug Marsh (St. Louis Cardinals, 1980–1986), Greg Morton (Buffalo Bills, 1977), Calvin O'Neal (Baltimore Colts, 1978), Mel Owens (Los Angeles Rams, 1981–1989), Tom Seabron (San Francisco 49ers, 1979–1980), St. Louis Cardinals, 1980), and Ron Simpkins (Cincinnati Bengals, 1980–1986, Green Bay Packers, 1988), and Jim Smith (Pittsburgh Steelers, 1977–1982, Los Angeles Raiders, 1985).

A 22nd player, Rick Leach, was drafted by the Denver Broncos, but opted instead to play Major League Baseball for the Detroit Tigers. Leach went on to play for 10 years in the major leagues.

Another, Mark Donahue, spent two seasons with the Cincinnati Bengals, but did not appear in a regular season game.

== Coaching staff ==
- Head coach: Bo Schembechler
- Assistant coaches: Dennis Brown – Varsity Reserve Coach, Tirrel Burton – Offensive Ends Coach, Jerry Hanlon – Offensive Line, Jack Harbaugh – Defensive Backs, Bill McCartney – Defensive Line, Gary Moeller – Defensive Coordinator, Tom Reed – Defensive Assistant, Paul Schudel – Offensive Interior Line, Chuck Stobart – Offensive Backs Coach
- Trainer: Lindsy McLean
- Manager: Robert I. Brown
