= 1976 Wisconsin Badgers football team =

American college football season

1976 Wisconsin Badgers football
- Conference: Big Ten Conference
- Record: 5–6 (3–5 Big Ten)
- Head coach: John Jardine (7th season)
- Offensive coordinator: Mike Stock (1st season)
- Offensive scheme: Multiple T
- Defensive coordinator: Charlie McBride (1st season)
- Base defense: 5–2
- MVP: Mike Carroll
- Captains: Mike Carroll; Andy Michuda; Ron Pollard; John Rasmussen
- Home stadium: Camp Randall Stadium

1976 Big Ten Conference football standings
	Conf.					Overall
Team	W		L		T	W		L		T
No. 3 Michigan +	7	–	1	–	0	10	–	2	–	0
No. 6 Ohio State +	7	–	1	–	0	9	–	2	–	1
Minnesota	4	–	4	–	0	6	–	5	–	0
Illinois	4	–	4	–	0	5	–	6	–	0
Indiana	4	–	4	–	0	5	–	6	–	0
Purdue	4	–	4	–	0	5	–	6	–	0
Iowa	3	–	5	–	0	5	–	6	–	0
Wisconsin	3	–	5	–	0	5	–	6	–	0
Michigan State	3	–	5	–	0	4	–	6	–	1
Northwestern	1	–	7	–	0	1	–	10	–	0
+ – Conference co-champions; Rankings from AP Poll

The 1976 Wisconsin Badgers football team was an American football team that represented the University of Wisconsin–Madison in the 1976 Big Ten Conference football season. In their seventh season under head coach John Jardine, the Badgers compiled a 5–6 record (3–5 against Big Ten opponents) and finished in a three-way tie for seventh place in the Big Ten.

Quarterback Mike Carroll was selected as the team's most valuable player and led the Big Ten Conference with 1,773 yards of total offense. Running back Larry Canada led the team with 993 rushing yards, the fifth-highest total in the Big Ten during the 1976 season. Ira Matthews was the team's leading scorer with 42 points on seven touchdowns.

David Charles was selected by the AP as a second-team wide receiver, and Dave Crossen by the UPI as a second-team linebacker, on the 1976 All-Big Ten Conference football team.

== Schedule ==
Date	Opponent	Site	Result	Attendance	Source
September 11	at No. 2 Michigan	Michigan Stadium; Ann Atbor, MI	L 27–40	101,347	
September 18	North Dakota*	Camp Randall Stadium; Madison, WI	W 45–9	62,213	
September 25	Washington State*	Camp Randall stadium; Madison, WI	W 35–26	69,658	
October 2	at No. 9 Kansas*	Memorial Stadium; Lawrence, KS	L 24–34	48,350	
October 9	Purdue	Camp Randall Stadium; Madison, WI	L 16–18	79,111	
October 16	No. 9 Ohio State	Camp Randall Stadium; Madison, WI	L 20–30	79,579	
October 23	at Northwestern	Dyche Stadium; Evanston, IL	W 28–25	24,580	
October 30	at Illinois	Memorial Stadium; Champaign, IL	L 25–31	54,121	
November 6	Iowa^{†}	Camp Randall Stadium; Madison, WI (rivalry)	W 38–21	79,521	
November 13	at Indiana	Memorial Stadium; Bloomington, IN	L 14–15	27,518	
November 20	Minnesota	Camp Randall Stadium; Madison, WI (rivalry)	W 26–17	60,304	
*Non-conference game; ^{†}Homecoming; Rankings from AP Poll released prior to the game

== Roster ==
1976 Wisconsin Badgers football team roster
Players
Coaches
Offense

Pos.	#	Name	Class
WR	81	Ray Bailey	Sr
TE	86	Greg Barber	So
RB	27	Terry Breuscher	Jr
FB	30	Larry Canada	Sr
QB	15	Mike Carroll (C)	Sr
WR	10	David Charles	So
FB	46	Tom Dohmeier	Sr
QB	17	Anthony Dudley	So
TE	85	Ron Egloff	Sr
QB	11	Charles Green	So
FB	36	Tim Halleran	So
G	59	Ron Hegwood	Sr
QB	18	Dave Hoppman	Sr
G	56	Brad Jackomino	So
OT	74	Tom Kaltenberg	Jr
G	68	David Krall	So
OT	60	Steve Lick	Jr
G	63	Terry Lyons	Sr
RB	25	Ira Matthews	So
C	58	Al Minter	Jr
C	52	Jim Moore	So
RB	33	Mike Morgan	Jr
FL	29	Ron Pollard (C)	Sr
G	67	Mike Prusinski	Sr
FB	26	Joe Rodriguez	Jr
WR	44	Randy Rose	Sr
TE	89	Jeff Walsh	Jr
OT	78	Doug Witkus	Jr

Defense

Pos.	#	Name	Class
DT	73	Henry Addy	So
DE	38	Kevin Boodry	So
S	41	Rick Christian	Sr
DE	7	Pat Collins	Sr
LB	55	Dave Cotteau	Sr
LB	14	Dave Crossen	So
S	22	Terry Cunningham	Sr
DT	57	Bob Czechowicz	Jr
MG	94	Tom Czechowicz	Sr
LB	66	Steve DiSalvo	Sr
DB	23	Ken Dixon	So
S	21	Scott Erdmann	So
CB	8	Greg Gordon	So
MG	54	Mike Grice	Jr
CB	37	Lawrence Johnson	So
MG	65	Tom Jones	Sr
LB	43	Mike Kelly	Sr
CB	5	Tim McConnell	Sr
DT	62	Andy Michuda (C)	Sr
DT	76	John Rasmussen (C)	Sr
MG	20	Dan Relich	So
S	9	Dan Schieble	So
DE	35	Dennis Stejskal	Jr
DE	89	Jeff Vine	Fr
LB	49	Lee Washington	Fr

Special teams

Pos.	#	Name	Class
K	2	Vince Lamia	Sr
P	3	Dick Milaeger	Jr

Head coach

- John Jardine

Coordinators/assistant coaches

- Mike Stock – Offensive Coordinator/Running Backs
- Charlie McBride – Defensive Coordinator/Defensive Line
- Tom Backhus – Guards and Centers
- Oree Banks – Wide Receivers
- Gary Blackney – Defensive Backs
- George Chryst – Tackles and Tight Ends
- Mario Russo – Linebackers
- Bob Spoo – Quarterbacks
- LaVern Van Dyke – Administrative Assistant

Legend

- (C) Team captain
- (S) Suspended
- (I) Ineligible
- Injured
- Redshirt

== Players selected in the 1977 NFL draft ==
Only one Wisconsin player was selected in the 1977 NFL draft.

Player	Position	Round	Pick	NFL club
John Rasmussen	Offensive tackle	10	276	New England Patriots
