= John Hennessy (American football) =

American football player (born 1955)

No. 63
- Position: Linebacker

Personal information
- Born: March 12, 1955 (age 71); Chicago, Illinois, U.S.
- Listed height: 6 ft 3 in (1.91 m)
- Listed weight: 243 lb (110 kg)

Career information
- High school: DePaul College Prep (Chicago)
- College: Michigan
- NFL draft: 1977: 10th round, 256th overall pick

Career history
- New York Jets (1977–1979); Green Bay Packers (1980)*
- * Offseason or practice squad member only

Career NFL statistics
- Sacks: 2
- Fumble recoveries: 1
- Stats at Pro Football Reference

John William Hennessy (born March 12, 1955) is an American former professional football player. He played college football at the linebacker position for the University of Michigan from 1974 to 1976. He also played in the National Football League (NFL) for the New York Jets from 1977 to 1979.

== Early life ==
Hennessy was born in Chicago, Illinois, in 1955. He attended high school at Gordon Tech, now known as DePaul College Prep in Chicago.

== University of Michigan ==
Hennessy played college football as a defensive tackle for Bo Schembechler's University of Michigan Wolverines football teams from 1974 to 1976. He started all 12 games at defensive tackle for the 1976 Michigan Wolverines football team. The 1976 Michigan team won the Big Ten Conference championship, advanced to the 1977 Rose Bowl, and finished the season ranked No. 3 in both the AP and UPI Polls.

== Professional football ==
Hennessy was drafted by the New York Jets in the tenth round (256th overall pick) of the 1977 NFL draft. As a rookie in 1977, he appeared in 14 games (two as a starter) for the Jets. The following year, he was a starter at linebacker in all 16 regular season games for the 1978 New York Jets. In 1979, he again appeared in all 16 games for the Jets, though none as a starter.

In May 1980, Hennessy was claimed by the Green Bay Packers after being placed on waivers by the Jets. He was released the Packers in late July 1980.
