= 1976 Iowa Hawkeyes football team =

American college football season

1976 Iowa Hawkeyes football
- Conference: Big Ten Conference
- Record: 5–6 (3–5 Big Ten)
- Head coach: Bob Commings (3rd season)
- Defensive coordinator: Larry Coyer (3rd season)
- MVPs: Butch Caldwell; Tom Grine
- Captains: Butch Caldwell; Tom Grine
- Home stadium: Kinnick Stadium

1976 Big Ten Conference football standings
	Conf.					Overall
Team	W		L		T	W		L		T
No. 3 Michigan +	7	–	1	–	0	10	–	2	–	0
No. 6 Ohio State +	7	–	1	–	0	9	–	2	–	1
Minnesota	4	–	4	–	0	6	–	5	–	0
Illinois	4	–	4	–	0	5	–	6	–	0
Indiana	4	–	4	–	0	5	–	6	–	0
Purdue	4	–	4	–	0	5	–	6	–	0
Iowa	3	–	5	–	0	5	–	6	–	0
Wisconsin	3	–	5	–	0	5	–	6	–	0
Michigan State	3	–	5	–	0	4	–	6	–	1
Northwestern	1	–	7	–	0	1	–	10	–	0
+ – Conference co-champions; Rankings from AP Poll

The 1976 Iowa Hawkeyes football team was an American football team that represented the University of Iowa as a member of the Big Ten Conference during the 1976 Big Ten football season. In their third year under head coach Bob Commings, the Hawkeyes compiled a 5–6 record (3–5 in conference games), finished in a three-way tie for seventh place in the Big Ten, and were outscored by a total of 234 to 161.

The 1975 Hawkeyes gained 2,144 rushing yards and 972 passing yards. On defense, they gave up 2,072 rushing yards and 1,151 passing yards.

Quarterback Butch Caldwell and tight end Tom Grine were selected as the team's most valuable players. Caldwell led the team with 616 passing yards and 1,005 yards of total offense. Jon Lazar led the team in rushing with 392 yards. Tom Rusk was selected by the conference coaches as a second-team linebacker on the UPI's 1976 All-Big Ten Conference football team. Grine and defensive back Jim Caldwell were the team captains.

The team played its home games at Kinnick Stadium in Iowa City, Iowa. Home attendance totaled 267,327, an average of 53,465 per game.

== Schedule ==
Date	Opponent	Site	Result	Attendance	Source
September 11	at Illinois	Memorial Stadium; Champaign, IL	L 6–24	49,515	
September 18	Syracuse*	Kinnick Stadium; Iowa City, IA	W 41–3	54,129	
September 25	at No. 11 Penn State*	Beaver Stadium; University Park, PA	W 7–6	61,268	
October 2	at No. 13 USC*	Los Angeles Memorial Coliseum; Los Angeles, CA	L 0–55	55,518	
October 9	No. 10 Ohio State	Kinnick Stadium; Iowa City, IA	L 14–34	59,170	
October 16	Indiana^{†}	Kinnick Stadium; Iowa City, IA	L 7–14	57,465	
October 23	at Minnesota	Memorial Stadium; Minneapolis, MN (rivalry)	W 22–12	53,222	
October 30	Northwestern	Kinnick Stadium; Iowa City, IA	W 13–10	51,800	
November 6	at Wisconsin	Camp Randall Stadium; Madison, WI (rivalry)	L 21–38	79,521	
November 13	Purdue	Kinnick Stadium; Iowa City, IA	L 0–21	44,763	
November 20	at Michigan State	Spartan Stadium; East Lansing, MI	W 30–17	48,412	
*Non-conference game; ^{†}Homecoming; Rankings from AP Poll released prior to the game

== Game summaries ==
=== At Penn State ===
Team	1	2	3	4	Total
• Hawkeyes	7	0	0	0	7
No. 11 Nittany Lions	0	0	0	6	6

- Date: September 25
- Location: Beaver Stadium,
  University Park, PA
- Game attendance: 61,268
- Game weather: Sunny

Scoring summary
Q1	IOWA	Renn 2 yard run (Quartaro kick)	IOWA 7–0
Q4	PSU	Suhey 1 yard run (pass failed)	IOWA 7–6

Penn State missed a 25-yard field goal with 47 seconds left.

== Roster ==
1976 Iowa Hawkeyes football team roster
Players
Coaches
Offense

Pos.	#	Name	Class
QB	17	Butch Caldwell (C)	Sr
QB		Tom McLaughlin	Jr
RB	18	Dennis Mosley	Fr
TE		Tom Grine (C)	Sr

Defense

Pos.	#	Name	Class
DB	21	Jim Caldwell	Sr
DB		Rod Sears

Special teams

Pos.	#	Name	Class
P	98	Dan Matter
K		Nick Quartaro	Sr

Head coach

- Bob Commings

Coordinators/assistant coaches

- Dennis Green – Running backs

Legend

- (C) Team captain
- (S) Suspended
- (I) Ineligible
- Injured
- Redshirt
