= Rick Leach (baseball) =

American football and baseball player (born 1957)

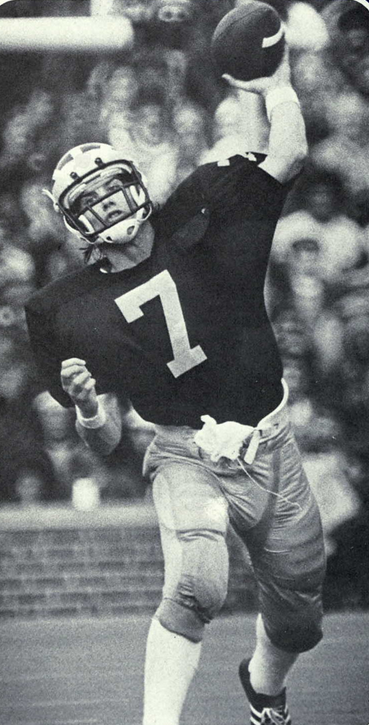
- Leach from 1976 Michiganensian
- Outfielder / First baseman
- Born: May 4, 1957 (age 69); Ann Arbor, Michigan, U.S.
- Batted: Left Threw: Left

MLB debut
- April 30, 1981, for the Detroit Tigers

Last MLB appearance
- August 5, 1990, for the San Francisco Giants

MLB statistics
- Batting average: .268
- Home runs: 18
- Runs batted in: 183
- Stats at Baseball Reference

Teams
- Detroit Tigers (1981–1983); Toronto Blue Jays (1984–1988); Texas Rangers (1989); San Francisco Giants (1990)

Richard Max Leach (born May 4, 1957) is an American former college football player and professional baseball player.

Leach was an all-state quarterback at Flint Southwestern High School in the fall of 1974, and the University of Michigan's starting quarterback in four consecutive seasons (1975–1978), leading the Wolverines to three straight Big Ten Conference championships and three appearances in the Rose Bowl. As a senior in 1978, he won the Big Ten Most Valuable Player, was selected as a first-team All-American, and finished third in the 1978 balloting for the Heisman Trophy.

As a baseball player he was selected by the Detroit Tigers in the first round (13th overall) of the 1979 MLB draft. Leach opted to play professional baseball over football, primarily a backup outfielder and first baseman for the Tigers and Toronto Blue Jays. He had a career .268 batting average and .335 on-base percentage in 1,719 major league at bats from 1981 to 1990.

== Early life ==
Born in 1957 in Ann Arbor, Michigan, Leach attended Flint Southwestern High School in Flint and graduated in 1975. As a senior, he was selected as the first-team all-state quarterback by the Detroit Free Press. He broke every passing record in the Saginaw Valley League and was also an all-conference player in baseball and basketball. In 1998, the Detroit Free Press rated Leach as the fourth best quarterback to come out of a Michigan high school.

== University of Michigan ==
Leach enrolled at the University of Michigan in 1975. A left-hander, he was the Wolverines' starting quarterback from 1975 through 1978 under head coach Bo Schembechler. As an 18-year-old true freshman, Leach started 11 of 12 games and led the Wolverines to an 8–2–2 record and #8 ranking in the final AP poll. He rushed for 552 yards and passed for 680 yards as a freshman. With the Big Ten championship and a Rose Bowl berth on the line in the Michigan-Ohio State game, Leach threw an interception that was run back to the Michigan 3-yard line by Buckeye cornerback Ray Griffin and set up the winning touchdown in a 21–14 Ohio State victory. However, Leach and the Wolverines never lost to Ohio State again in his career.

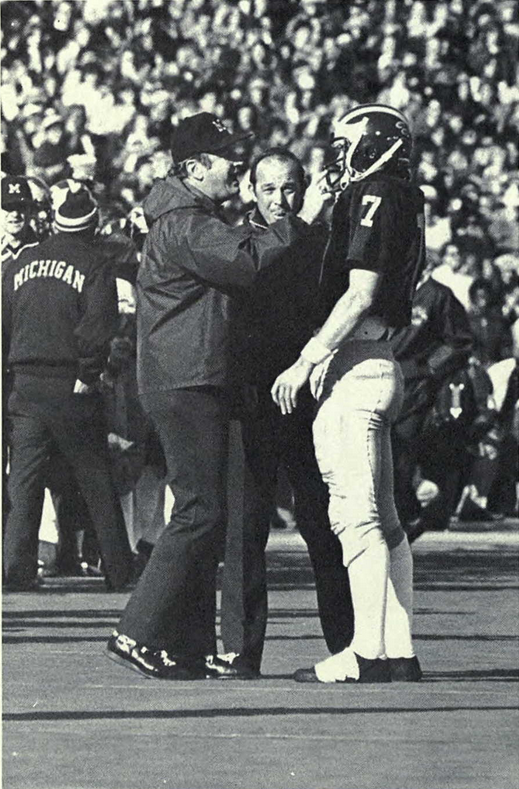
Head coach Bo Schembechler and Leach (#7) in 1975

As a sophomore in 1976, he started all 12 games at quarterback and led the team to a 10–2 record and #3 ranking in the final AP poll. He passed for 973 yards and 13 touchdowns and rushed for 638 yards and 10 touchdowns in 1976.

As a junior, he started all twelve games at quarterback and led the 1977 team to a 10–2 record and #9 ranking in the final AP poll. He passed for 1,348 yards and 15 touchdowns and rushed for 375 yards and seven touchdowns.

As a senior in 1978, he again started all twelve games and led Michigan to a 10–2 record and #5 ranking in the final AP poll. He passed for 1,283 yards and 17 touchdowns and rushed for 611 yards and 12 touchdowns. Leach won numerous individual honors in 1978, including the following:

- Won the Chicago Tribune Silver Football trophy as the most valuable player in the Big Ten Conference.
- Tied with Chuck Fusina as the first-team quarterback on the All-America Team selected by the American Football Coaches Association.
- Selected by both the Associated Press (media) and United Press International (coaches) as the first-team quarterback on the All-Big Ten team.
- Finished third in the balloting for the Heisman Trophy, behind Billy Sims and Chuck Fusina.
- Selected as the co-Most Valuable Player (along with Charles White) of the Rose Bowl, his last game as a Wolverine.

Leach was the first NCAA Division I (now FBS) player to pass for 200 points and score 200 points. He continues to hold the NCAA record for highest percentage of passes for touchdowns (400-499 attempts) with 45 in 462. One of the finest athletes in Michigan history, Leach was named All-Big Ten as a quarterback three times and also placed in the voting for the Heisman Trophy three times.

Leach shattered all Michigan's career passing, total offense and touchdown records. He set an NCAA record for most touchdowns accounted for (82) and broke Big Ten records for total offense (6,460 yards), total plays (1,034), and touchdown passes (48).

Leach won the Big Ten batting championship as a junior, and won the rare honor of being named All-American in both football and baseball.

In 1999, Sports Illustrated published a list of "The 50 Greatest Sports Figures from Michigan" (in all sports), and ranked Leach 22nd. "The 50 Greatest Sports Figures from Michigan," Sports Illustrated, December 27, 1999.

=== College statistics ===
Legend
	Led the Big Ten
**Bold**	Career high

College passing & rushing statistics*
Season	School	Games	Cmp	Att	Yds	Pct	TD	INT	QBR	Car	Yds	Avg	TD
Team		Passing								Rushing			
1975	Michigan	**12**	32	100	680	32.0%	3	12	75.0	113	552	4.9	5
1976	Michigan	**12**	50	105	973	47.6%	13	8	**151.1**	114	**638**	**5.6**	10
1977	Michigan	11	76	147	1,109	**51.7%**	13	7	134.7	106	370	3.5	7
1978	Michigan	**12**	**78**	**158**	**1,283**	49.4%	**17**	**6**	145.5	**145**	611	4.2	**12**
Career	Michigan	47	236	510	4,045	46.3%	46	33	129.7	478	2,171	4.5	34

* Includes bowl games.

== Professional baseball ==
Leach was selected by the Detroit Tigers in the first round (13th overall) of the 1979 Major League Baseball draft. A month earlier at the NFL draft in early May, he was taken in the fifth round (132nd overall) by the Denver Broncos, but opted for a career in baseball. He signed with the Tigers in June 1979 and received a $150,000 signing bonus. Leach spent the 1979 season with the Tigers' Class A farm club in Lakeland, Florida; he appeared in 48 games and compiled a .304 batting average and .402 on-base percentage and had 23 RBIs in 168 at bats. In 1980, Leach was promoted to the Tigers' Class AAA team in Evansville, Indiana, where he had a .272 batting average and .386 on-base percentage with 58 RBIs in 430 at bats.

After batting .386 for Evansville during April 1981, Leach was promoted to the Tigers' roster, making his major league debut in late April 1981. He appeared in 54 games and compiled a disappointing .193 batting average in 83 at bats. Leach remained with the Tigers for two more seasons, principally in a backup role with batting averages of .239 in 1982 and .248 in 1983; the Tigers released him on March 24, 1984, and was signed by the Toronto Blue Jays less than two weeks later.

Leach spent April 1984 and most of the 1985 season with the Triple-A Syracuse Chiefs of the International League. He was promoted to Toronto and remained on their roster through 1988; his best season was 1986, with a .309 batting average in 110 games.

Leach concluded his major league career with the Texas Rangers in 1989 and the San Francisco Giants in 1990. During a road trip with Texas in May 1989 to New York, Leach disappeared. The Rangers filed a missing persons report, and Leach reappeared a day later. After a positive drug test in late July 1990 at age 33, Leach was placed on the 60-day disqualified list in August and agreed to enter drug rehabilitation. In March 1991, the Giants asked waivers on Leach for the purpose of giving him an unconditional release.

== Later years ==
In 2008, Leach was elected to the Michigan Sports Hall of Fame.

== See also ==
- Michigan Wolverines football statistical leaders
