= Jeff Logan =

American football player (born 1956)

Jeff Logan starred as a running back at Hoover High School in North Canton, Ohio, establishing numerous scoring records. Logan went to Ohio State University in 1974 and played on two Big Ten Conference Championship football teams. Logan backed up two-time Heisman Trophy winner Archie Griffin for two seasons and then started in 1976 and 1977, Co-Captain of the 1977 team. He was awarded All Big 10 first team and Academic All-American honors.

Logan was the color analyst for the Ohio State Football radio network from 1992 to 1998 working with Terry Smith, currently the voice of the Los Angeles Angels. He is the color analyst on the CW Columbus "Friday Night Rivals" high school football telecasts. He is a broadcast team member on the Best Buckeye Coverage" 610WTVN pre and post game for all Ohio State Football broadcasts. He is an accomplished amateur golfer.

Logan was recognized in 2016 by the Ohio State Alumni Association with the Mershon Award for service to Ohio State. He was honored with the Ohio Gold award by the Columbus Chapter of the National Football Foundation and College Hall of Fame. In 2024, Logan was named to the Ohio State University Athletics Hall of Fame.

Logan was one of the founding members of the "Logan Family Foundation" which holds a charity golf tournament every year, with proceeds being used for a variety of charitable organizations and causes that benefits children and families in Stark County, Columbus and Ashland, Ohio.

Preceded by Archie Griffin	Ohio State Buckeyes; Starting Tailbacks; 1976	Succeeded by Ron Springs
