= Scott Studwell =

American football player (born 1954)

No. 55
- Position: Linebacker

Personal information
- Born: August 27, 1954 (age 72); Evansville, Indiana, U.S.
- Listed height: 6 ft 2 in (1.88 m)
- Listed weight: 228 lb (103 kg)

Career information
- High school: William Henry Harrison (Evansville, Indiana)
- College: Illinois (1973–1976)
- NFL draft: 1977: 9th round, 250th overall pick

Career history

Playing
- Minnesota Vikings (1977–1990)

Operations
- Minnesota Vikings (2002–2019) Director of college scouting

Awards and highlights
- 2× Pro Bowl (1987, 1988); Minnesota Vikings Ring of Honor; 50 Greatest Vikings; Minnesota Vikings 25th Anniversary Team; Minnesota Vikings 40th Anniversary Team; Minnesota Vikings All-Mall of America Field Team; Third-team All-American (1976); First-team All-Big Ten (1976); Second-team All-Big Ten (1975)

Career NFL statistics
- Sacks: 10
- Interceptions: 11
- Interception yards: 97
- Fumble recoveries: 16
- Stats at Pro Football Reference

John Scott Studwell (born August 27, 1954), nicknamed "Stud", is an American former professional football player who was a linebacker who played for the Minnesota Vikings of the National Football League (NFL). He played college football for the Illinois Fighting Illini. He was a two-time Pro Bowl selection with the Vikings.

== College career ==
Studwell graduated from the University of Illinois, where he starred as a linebacker. He left Illinois ranked second behind Dick Butkus in career tackles in 1977, and was drafted in the ninth round by the Minnesota Vikings, for whom he played 14 seasons from 1977 to 1990. During that time, he was selected to two Pro Bowls.

== Minnesota Vikings ==
He retired as the Vikings all-time leading tackler with 1,981 in his career and holds team records for single-season tackles with 230 in 1981 and 24 in a game against Detroit in 1985. He was a member of the Vikings 25th and 40th Anniversary season teams and was named one of the 50 greatest Vikings in 2010.

== Scouting ==
After a successful career with the Vikings, he moved into their front office and since 2002 he has been the Director of College Scouting which is responsible for all the preparations of the NFL draft. Studwell personally scouts the majority of the players the Vikings pursue and spends nearly half of each year on the road.

On April 23, 2019, Studwell announced his retirement from the Vikings organization. He had been in the organization as either a player or as a part of the front office for 42 years.
