= 2021 Pittsburgh Steelers season =

89th season in franchise history; final one with Ben Roethlisberger

- Owner: The Rooney Family
- General manager: Kevin Colbert
- Head coach: Mike Tomlin
- Offensive coordinator: Matt Canada
- Defensive coordinator: Keith Butler
- Home stadium: Heinz Field

Results
- Record: 9–7–1
- Division place: 2nd AFC North
- Playoffs: Lost Wild Card Playoffs (at Chiefs) 21–42
- All-Pros: 2: DT Cameron Heyward (1st team); LB T. J. Watt (1st team)
- Pro Bowlers: 4: RB Najee Harris; WR Diontae Johnson; OLB T. J. Watt; DT Cameron Heyward
- Team MVP: T. J. Watt
- Team ROY: Najee Harris

Uniform
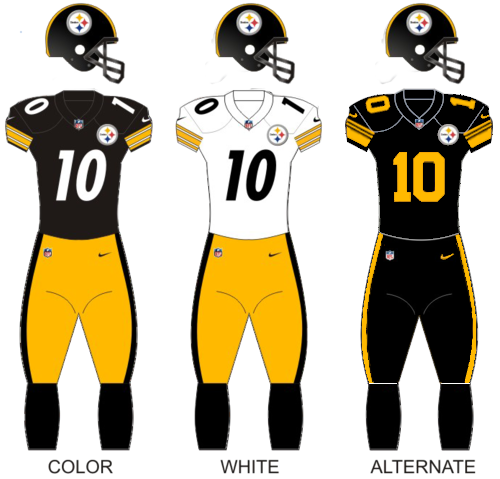

The 2021 season was the Pittsburgh Steelers' 89th season in the National Football League (NFL), their 22nd and final season under general manager Kevin Colbert and their 15th under head coach Mike Tomlin. They failed to improve upon their 12–4 record from 2020 and failed to win their division in back to back years for the first time since 2016–2017. However, despite only having a 6% chance to make the playoffs according to FiveThirtyEight before Week 18, they did clinch a Wild Card spot that week as well as make the playoffs in consecutive years for the first time since 2014–2017 after defeating the Baltimore Ravens, combined with the Las Vegas Raiders and Los Angeles Chargers not tying and the Jacksonville Jaguars upsetting the Indianapolis Colts; this came despite the Steelers finishing with a −55 point differential. However the Steelers were defeated in the first round of the playoffs by the Kansas City Chiefs 42–21.

For the first time since 2009, center Maurkice Pouncey was not on the roster, as he announced his retirement on February 12. Also, for the first time since 2011, guard David DeCastro was not on the roster, as he was released by the Steelers on June 24. It was also quarterback Ben Roethlisberger's final season with the Steelers as he announced his retirement on January 27, 2022, after 18 seasons with the team. A 6-time Pro Bowler, Roethlisberger led the Steelers to 12 playoff appearances and 3 Super Bowl appearances, winning 2 of them in 2005 and 2008 respectively. He also retired as 5th all-time in passing yards, and was the last remaining active quarterback from the 2004 draft class. During the season, running back Najee Harris broke franchise legend Franco Harris's record for most rushing yards by a Steeler rookie with 1,200; the previous record was 1,055.

== Transactions ==
The Steelers have been involved in the following transactions during the 2021 season:

=== Free agent signings ===
==== Lost ====
Player	Lost to	Date	Contract terms
OT Matt Feiler	Los Angeles Chargers	March 17	3 years / $21 million
OLB Bud Dupree	Tennessee Titans	March 18	5 years / $82.5 million
CB Mike Hilton	Cincinnati Bengals	March 19	4 years / $24 million
OLB Ola Adeniyi	Tennessee Titans	March 22	1 year / $1 million
FS Sean Davis	Indianapolis Colts	April 1	1 year / $1.127 million
RB James Conner	Arizona Cardinals	April 13	1 year / $1.75 million
OT Alejandro Villanueva	Baltimore Ravens	May 6	2 year / $14 million

==== Acquired ====
Player	Acquired from	Date	Contract terms
C B. J. Finney	Cincinnati Bengals	March 12	3 years / $9.75 million
G Joe Haeg	Tampa Bay Buccaneers	March 24	2 years / $4.6 million
LB Miles Killebrew	Detroit Lions	March 28	1 year / $1.127 million
G Rashaad Coward	Chicago Bears	March 30	1 year / $900,000
RB Kalen Ballage	Los Angeles Chargers	March 30	1 year / $920,000
DE Abdullah Anderson	Chicago Bears	April 12	1 year / $780,000
CB Arthur Maulet	New York Jets	May 7	1 year / $990,000
G Trai Turner	Los Angeles Chargers	June 25	1 year / $3 million
K Sam Sloman	Tennessee Titans	July 1	1 year / $780,000

=== Cuts ===
Position	Player	Date
CB	Steven Nelson	March 23
P	Corliss Waitman	May 3
TE	Charles Jones	May 3
CB	Trevor Williams	May 7
S	John Battle	May 7
OG	David DeCastro	June 24

== Draft ==
2021 Pittsburgh Steelers Draft
Round	Selection	Player	Position	College	Notes
1	24	Najee Harris	RB	Alabama	
2	55	Pat Freiermuth	TE	Penn State	
3	87	Kendrick Green	C	Illinois	
4	128	Dan Moore Jr.	OT	Texas A&M	
4	140	Buddy Johnson	ILB	Texas A&M	Compensatory selection
5	156	Isaiahh Loudermilk	DT	Wisconsin	from Dallas via Philadelphia and Miami
6	216	Quincy Roche	OLB	Miami	from Tampa Bay
7	245	Tre Norwood	CB	Oklahoma	from Miami
7	254	Pressley Harvin III	P	Georgia Tech	from Baltimore

=== Undrafted free agents ===
Player	Position	College
Shakur Brown	CB	Michigan State
Rico Bussey	WR	Hawaii
Isaiah McKoy	WR	Kent State
Roland Rivers III	QB	Slippery Rock
Calvin Bundage	OLB	Oklahoma State
Jamar Watson	ILB	Kentucky
DeMarkus Acy	CB	Missouri
Lamont Wade	S	Penn State
Mark Gilbert	CB	Duke
Donovan Stiner	FS	Florida

Pre-draft trades

- Pittsburgh was awarded a compensatory selection in the fourth round (140th overall).
- Pittsburgh traded its fifth-round selection to Baltimore in exchange for defensive end Chris Wormley and a seventh-round selection.
- Pittsburgh traded a sixth-round selection and 2020 first- and fifth-round selections to Miami in exchange for a seventh-round selection, a 2020 fourth-round selection, and safety Minkah Fitzpatrick.
- Pittsburgh acquired a sixth-round selection from Tampa Bay in exchange for offensive tackle Jerald Hawkins and a seventh-round selection.

== Staff ==
2021 Pittsburgh Steelers staff
Front office: President – Art Rooney II; Vice president – Art Rooney Jr.; Vice president & general manager – Kevin Colbert; Vice president of football and business administration – Omar Khan; Football administration coordinator – Cole Marcoux; Player personnel coordinator – Dan Rooney Jr.; College scouting coordinator – Phil Kreidler; Pro scouting coordinator – Brandon Hunt; College/Pro Scout – Dan Colbert; College/Pro Scout – Dave Pettet; Area Scout – Kelvin Fisher; Director of player development – Darrel Young; Head coaches: Head coach – Mike Tomlin; Assistant head coach – John Mitchell; Offensive coaches: Offensive coordinator – Matt Canada; Quarterbacks – Mike Sullivan; Running backs – Eddie Faulkner; Wide receivers – Ike Hilliard; Assistant wide receivers – Blaine Stewart; Tight ends – Alfredo Roberts; Offensive line – Adrian Klemm; Assistant offensive line – Chris Morgan	Defensive coaches: Defensive coordinator – Keith Butler; Defensive line – Karl Dunbar; Assistant outside linebackers – Denzel Martin; Inside linebackers – Jerry Olsavsky; Defensive backs – Grady Brown; Senior defensive assistant/secondary – Teryl Austin; Special teams coaches: Special teams coordinator – Danny Smith; Coaching Assistant – Matt Symmes; Strength and conditioning: Conditioning coordinator – Garrett Giemont; Head strength and conditioning coach – Marcel Pastoor; Strength and conditioning assistant – Rodain Delus

== Final roster ==
2021 Pittsburgh Steelers roster
Quarterbacks (QB): 3 Dwayne Haskins; 7 Ben Roethlisberger; 2 Mason Rudolph; Running backs (RB): 29 Kalen Ballage; 22 Najee Harris; 26 Anthony McFarland Jr.; 24 Benny Snell; 44 Derek Watt FB; Wide receivers (WR): 11 Chase Claypool; 18 Diontae Johnson; 14 Ray-Ray McCloud; 19 JuJu Smith-Schuster; 13 James Washington; 15 Cody White; Tight ends (TE): 88 Pat Freiermuth; 81 Zach Gentry; 87 Kevin Rader	Offensive linemen (OL): 72 Zach Banner T; 53 Kendrick Green C; 71 Joe Haeg T; 60 J. C. Hassenauer C; 77 John Leglue G; 65 Dan Moore T; 76 Chukwuma Okorafor T; 51 Trai Turner G; Defensive linemen (DL): 57 Montravius Adams DE; 73 Carlos Davis DE; 97 Cameron Heyward DE; 92 Isaiahh Loudermilk DE; 99 Henry Mondeaux NT; 95 Chris Wormley DE	Linebackers (LB): 27 Marcus Allen ILB; 55 Devin Bush Jr. ILB; 98 Taco Charlton OLB; 54 Ulysees Gilbert ILB; 56 Alex Highsmith OLB; 30 Tegray Scales ILB; 93 Joe Schobert ILB; 41 Robert Spillane ILB; 48 Derrek Tuszka OLB; 90 T. J. Watt OLB; Defensive backs (DB): 34 Terrell Edmunds SS; 39 Minkah Fitzpatrick FS; 23 Joe Haden CB; 28 Miles Killebrew SS; 31 Justin Layne CB; 35 Arthur Maulet CB; 21 Tre Norwood FS; 20 Cameron Sutton CB; 25 Ahkello Witherspoon CB; Special teams (ST): 9 Chris Boswell K; 6 Pressley Harvin III P; 46 Christian Kuntz LS	Practice squad: 61 Daniel Archibong DE; 79 Rashaad Coward T; 68 Khalil Davis DE; 33 Trey Edmunds RB; 62 Nate Gilliam G; 74 Chaz Green T; 8 Karl Joseph SS; 17 Anthony Miller WR; 64 Malcolm Pridgeon G; 50 Delontae Scott OLB; 38 John Simon OLB; 82 Steven Sims WR; 16 Sam Sloman K; 40 Linden Stephens CB; 89 Jace Sternberger TE; 37 Donovan Stiner SS; Reserve: 94 Tyson Alualu NT (IR); -- Demarcus Christmas NT (IR); 69 Kevin Dotson G (IR); 5 Joshua Dobbs QB (IR); 85 Eric Ebron TE (IR); 67 B. J. Finney G (IR); 45 Buddy Johnson ILB (COVID-19); 42 James Pierre CB (COVID-19); 91 Stephon Tuitt DE (IR); Rookies in italics 53 active, 9 reserve, 16 practice squad

== Preseason ==
On February 15, the NFL announced that the Steelers would face the Dallas Cowboys in the Pro Football Hall of Fame Game on Thursday, August 5, at Tom Benson Hall of Fame Stadium in Canton, Ohio. The game kicked off at 8:00 p.m. EDT, televised by Fox. The Steelers were represented by former head coach Bill Cowher and safeties Troy Polamalu and Donnie Shell. The Steelers and Cowboys were scheduled to play in the 2020 Hall of Fame game; however, the game, the annual Hall of Fame enshrinement, along with the entire 2020 preseason, were cancelled due to the COVID-19 pandemic, and the Hall of Fame game between the Steelers and Cowboys was rescheduled for 2021. The Steelers ended up defeating the Cowboys by a score of 16–3.

The remainder of the Steelers' preseason opponents and schedule was announced on May 12.

Week	Date	Opponent	Result	Record	Venue	Recap
HOF	August 5	vs. Dallas Cowboys	W 16–3	1–0	Tom Benson Hall of Fame Stadium (Canton)	Recap
1	August 12	at Philadelphia Eagles	W 24–16	2–0	Lincoln Financial Field	Recap
2	August 21	Detroit Lions	W 26–20	3–0	Heinz Field	Recap
3	August 27	at Carolina Panthers	L 9–34	3–1	Bank of America Stadium	Recap

== Regular season ==
=== Schedule ===
The Steelers' 2021 schedule was announced on May 12.

Week	Date	Opponent	Result	Record	Venue	Recap
1	September 12	at Buffalo Bills	**W** 23–16	1–0	Highmark Stadium	Recap
2	September 19	Las Vegas Raiders	**L** 17−26	1–1	Heinz Field	Recap
3	September 26	**Cincinnati Bengals**	**L** 10–24	1–2	Heinz Field	Recap
4	October 3	at Green Bay Packers	**L** 17–27	1–3	Lambeau Field	Recap
5	October 10	Denver Broncos	**W** 27–19	2–3	Heinz Field	Recap
6	October 17	Seattle Seahawks	**W** 23–20 (OT)	3–3	Heinz Field	Recap
7	Bye					
8	October 31	at **Cleveland Browns**	**W** 15–10	4–3	FirstEnergy Stadium	Recap
9	November 8	Chicago Bears	**W** 29–27	5–3	Heinz Field	Recap
10	November 14	Detroit Lions	**T** 16–16 (OT)	5–3–1	Heinz Field	Recap
11	November 21	at Los Angeles Chargers	**L** 37–41	5–4–1	SoFi Stadium	Recap
12	November 28	at **Cincinnati Bengals**	**L** 10–41	5–5–1	Paul Brown Stadium	Recap
13	December 5	**Baltimore Ravens**	**W** 20–19	6–5–1	Heinz Field	Recap
14	December 9	at Minnesota Vikings	**L** 28–36	6–6–1	U.S. Bank Stadium	Recap
15	December 19	Tennessee Titans	**W** 19–13	7–6–1	Heinz Field	Recap
16	December 26	at Kansas City Chiefs	**L** 10–36	7–7–1	Arrowhead Stadium	Recap
17	January 3	**Cleveland Browns**	**W** 26–14	8–7–1	Heinz Field	Recap
18	January 9	at **Baltimore Ravens**	**W** 16–13 (OT)	9–7–1	M&T Bank Stadium	Recap

Note: Intra-division opponents are in bold text.

=== Game summaries ===
==== Week 1: at Buffalo Bills ====
Week 1: Pittsburgh Steelers at Buffalo Bills – Game summary

Quarter	1	2	3	4	Total
**Steelers**	0	0	6	17	**23**
Bills	3	7	0	6	**16**

at Highmark Stadium, Orchard Park, New York

- Date: September 12
- Game time: 1:00 p.m. EDT
- Game weather: Cloudy, 73 °F (23 °C)
- Game attendance: 69,787
- Referee: John Hussey
- TV announcers (CBS): Ian Eagle, Charles Davis and Evan Washburn
- Recap, Game Book

Game information

**First quarter**

- BUF – Tyler Bass 37-yard field goal, 13:30. Bills 3–0. **Drive: 4 plays, 5 yards, 1:30.**

**Second quarter**

- BUF – Gabe Davis 3-yard pass from Josh Allen (Tyler Bass kick), 0:22. Bills 10–0. **Drive: 13 plays, 91 yards, 5:39.**

**Third quarter**

- PIT – Chris Boswell 24-yard field goal, 10:23. Bills 10–3. **Drive: 10 plays, 69 yards, 4:37.**
- PIT – Chris Boswell 20-yard field goal, 1:47. Bills 10–6. **Drive: 11 plays, 62 yards, 4:01.**

**Fourth quarter**

- PIT – Diontae Johnson 5-yard pass from Ben Roethlisberger (Chris Boswell kick), 11:19. Steelers 13–10. **Drive: 4 plays, 52 yards, 2:23.**
- PIT – Ulysees Gilbert 9-yard return of blocked punt (Chris Boswell kick), 9:45. Steelers 20–10.
- BUF – Tyler Bass 25-yard field goal, 5:23. Steelers 20–13. **Drive: 9 plays, 67 yards, 4:22.**
- PIT – Chris Boswell 45-yard field goal, 2:42. Steelers 23–13. **Drive: 9 plays, 48 yards, 2:41.**
- BUF – Tyler Bass 42-yard field goal, 0:46. Steelers 23–16. **Drive: 10 plays, 40 yards, 1:56.**

**Top passers**

- PIT – Ben Roethlisberger – 18/32, 188 yards, TD
- BUF – Josh Allen – 30/51, 270 yards, TD

**Top rushers**

- PIT – Najee Harris – 16 rushes, 45 yards
- BUF – Devin Singletary – 11 rushes, 72 yards

**Top receivers**

- PIT – JuJu Smith-Schuster – 4 receptions, 52 yards
- BUF – Stefon Diggs – 9 receptions, 69 yards

The first half was all Bills scoring when Tyler Bass kicked a 37-yard field goal to make it 3–0 in the first. In the second quarter, they made the halftime score 10–0 when Josh Allen found Gabe Davis for a 3-yard touchdown pass. After halftime, the Steelers went to work, with Chris Boswell scoring 2 field goals in the third quarter, from 24 and 20 yards out, to make it 10–3 and then 10–6. In the fourth quarter, the Steelers would take the lead when Ben Roethlisberger found Diontae Johnson on a 5-yard touchdown pass to make it 13–10. Miles Killebrew then blocked a punt and Ulysees Gilbert III returned it 9 yards for a touchdown to make it 20–10. The Bills drew closer when Bass kicked a 23-yard field goal to make it 20–13. The Steelers responded with a 45-yard field goal from Boswell to make it 23–13. The Bills then once again came within a touchdown when Bass kicked a 42-yard field goal to make it 23–16. The Bills then tried for an onside kick. However, JuJu Smith-Schuster would recover the kick, sealing the Steelers' win.

==== Week 2: vs. Las Vegas Raiders ====
Week 2: Las Vegas Raiders at Pittsburgh Steelers – Game summary

Quarter	1	2	3	4	Total
**Raiders**	3	6	7	10	**26**
Steelers	0	7	0	10	**17**

at Heinz Field, Pittsburgh, Pennsylvania

- Date: September 19
- Game time: 1:00 p.m. EDT
- Game weather: Sunny, 79 °F (26 °C)
- Game attendance: 63,707
- Referee: Jerome Boger
- TV announcers (CBS): Ian Eagle, Charles Davis and Evan Washburn
- Recap, Game Book

Game information

**First quarter**

- LV – Daniel Carlson 46-yard field goal, 3:10. Raiders 3–0. **Drive: 5 plays, 12 yards, 2:34.**

**Second quarter**

- LV – Daniel Carlson 33-yard field goal, 9:34. Raiders 6–0. **Drive: 8 plays, 47 yards, 3:58.**
- PIT – JuJu Smith-Schuster 3-yard run (Chris Boswell kick), 6:25. Steelers 7–6. **Drive: 7 plays, 75 yards, 3:09.**
- LV – Daniel Carlson 41-yard goal, 0:02. Raiders 9–7. **Drive: 13 plays, 53 yards, 6:23.**

**Third quarter**

- LV – Foster Moreau 9-yard pass from Derek Carr (Daniel Carlson kick), 5:02. Raiders 16–7. **Drive: 7 plays, 82 yards, 4:09.**

**Fourth quarter**

- PIT – Najee Harris 25-yard pass from Ben Roethlisberger (Chris Boswell kick), 11:15. Raiders 16–14. **Drive: 5 plays, 80 yards, 1:41.**
- LV – Henry Ruggs 61-yard pass from Derek Carr (Daniel Carlson kick), 9:35. Raiders 23–14. **Drive: 5 plays, 75 yards, 1:40.**
- PIT – Chris Boswell 56-yard field goal, 3:42. Raiders 23–17. **Drive: 8 plays, 30 yards, 2:09.**
- LV – Daniel Carlson 45-yard field goal, 0:20. Raiders 26–17. **Drive: 7 plays, 30 yards, 3:22.**

**Top passers**

- LV – Derek Carr – 28/37, 382 yards, 2 TD
- PIT – Ben Roethlisberger – 27/40, 295 yards, TD, INT

**Top rushers**

- LV – Peyton Barber – 13 rushes, 32 yards
- PIT – Najee Harris – 10 rushes, 38 yards

**Top receivers**

- LV – Henry Ruggs – 5 receptions, 113 yards, TD
- PIT – Diontae Johnson – 9 receptions, 105 yards

After a tough road win, the Steelers headed home to face the Raiders. In the first quarter, Raiders kicker Daniel Carlson kicked a 46-yard field goal to get his team on the board 3–0. They would make it 6–0 in the second quarter when Carlson kicked a 33-yard field goal. The Steelers took the lead when JuJu Smith-Schuster ran for a 3-yard touchdown to make it 7–6. However, the Raiders took the lead back when Carlson kicked a 41-yard field goal to make it 9–7 at halftime. The Raiders increased their lead in the third quarter when Derek Carr found Foster Moreau on a 9-yard touchdown pass to make it 16–7. The Steelers then came within 2 points after Ben Roethlisberger found Najee Harris on a 25-yard touchdown pass to make it 16–14. The Raiders then pulled away when Carr found Henry Ruggs III on a 61-yard touchdown pass to make it 23–14. Chris Boswell then kicked a 56-yard field goal to bring the Steelers within 6, 23–17. The Raiders were able to seal the victory with Carlson's 45-yard field goal to make the final score 26–17.

This marked the Steelers' first home loss to the Raiders since 2009.

==== Week 3: vs. Cincinnati Bengals ====
Week 3: Cincinnati Bengals at Pittsburgh Steelers – Game summary

Quarter	1	2	3	4	Total
**Bengals**	7	7	10	0	**24**
Steelers	0	7	0	3	**10**

at Heinz Field, Pittsburgh, Pennsylvania

- Date: September 26
- Game time: 1:00 p.m. EDT
- Game weather: Sunny, 70 °F (21 °C)
- Game attendance: 58,076
- Referee: Clete Blakeman
- TV announcers (CBS): Kevin Harlan, Trent Green and Melanie Collins
- Recap, Game Book

Game information

**First quarter**

- CIN – Tyler Boyd 17-yard pass from Joe Burrow (Evan McPherson kick), 2:54. Bengals 7–0. **Drive: 6 plays, 42 yards, 3:51.**

**Second quarter**

- PIT – Pat Freiermuth 4-yard pass from Ben Roethlisberger (Chris Boswell kick), 1:04. Tied 7–7. **Drive: 15 plays, 86 yards, 8:32.**
- CIN – Ja'Marr Chase 34-yard pass from Joe Burrow (Evan McPherson kick), 0:37. Bengals 14–7. **Drive: 3 plays, 75 yards, 0:27.**

**Third quarter**

- CIN – Evan McPherson 43-yard field goal, 8:47. Bengals 17–7. **Drive: 10 plays, 55 yards, 6:13.**
- CIN – Ja'Marr Chase 9-yard pass from Joe Burrow (Evan McPherson kick), 6:18. Bengals 24–7. **Drive: 3 plays, 19 yards, 1:33.**

**Fourth quarter**

- PIT – Chris Boswell 26-yard field goal, 8:09. Bengals 24–10. **Drive: 18 plays, 88 yards, 9:03.**

**Top passers**

- CIN – Joe Burrow – 14/18, 172 yards, 3 TD, INT
- PIT – Ben Roethlisberger – 38/58, 318 yards, TD, 2 INT

**Top rushers**

- CIN – Joe Mixon – 18 rushes, 90 yards
- PIT – Najee Harris – 14 rushes, 40 yards

**Top receivers**

- CIN – Ja'Marr Chase – 4 receptions, 65 yards, 2 TD
- PIT – Najee Harris – 14 receptions, 102 yards

After a tough loss, the Steelers stayed home for Round 1 against the Bengals. The Bengals scored first in the first quarter for their only score when Joe Burrow found Tyler Boyd on a 17-yard touchdown pass to make it 7–0. The Steelers tied it up in the second quarter when Ben Roethlisberger found Pat Freiermuth on a 4-yard touchdown pass to make it 7–7. The Bengals took the lead back when Burrow found Ja'Marr Chase on a 34-yard touchdown pass for a 14–7 halftime lead. After the break, the Bengals went back to work in the third quarter, scoring twice: Evan McPhearson kicked a 43-yard field goal to make it 17–7, followed by Burrow's third touchdown pass of the day (and second pass to Chase) to make it 24–7. In the fourth quarter, only the Steelers would score with Chris Boswell's 26-yard field goal to make the eventual final score 24–10.

This marked the Steelers' first home loss to the Bengals since 2015.

==== Week 4: at Green Bay Packers ====
Week 4: Pittsburgh Steelers at Green Bay Packers – Game summary

Quarter	1	2	3	4	Total
Steelers	7	3	0	7	**17**
**Packers**	0	17	10	0	**27**

at Lambeau Field, Green Bay, Wisconsin

- Date: October 3
- Game time: 4:25 p.m. EDT/3:25 p.m. CDT
- Game weather: Cloudy, 67 °F (19 °C)
- Game attendance: 78,281
- Referee: Scott Novak
- TV announcers (CBS): Jim Nantz, Tony Romo and Tracy Wolfson
- Recap, Game Book

Game information

**First quarter**

- PIT – Diontae Johnson 45-yard pass from Ben Roethlisberger (Chris Boswell kick), 10:04. Steelers 7–0. **Drive: 8 plays, 75 yards, 4:56.**

**Second quarter**

- GB – Aaron Rodgers 4-yard run (Mason Crosby kick), 13:22. Tied 7–7. **Drive: 13 plays, 64 yards, 4:51.**
- GB – Randall Cobb 23-yard pass from Aaron Rogers (Mason Crosby kick), 10:55. Packers 14–7. **Drive: 4 plays, 23 yards, 1:33.**
- PIT – Chris Boswell 52-yard field goal, 5:41. Packers 14–10. **Drive: 10 plays, 41 yards, 5:14.**
- GB – Mason Crosby 26-yard field goal, 0:05. Packers 17–10. **Drive: 13 plays, 76 yards, 5:36.**

**Third quarter**

- GB – Mason Crosby 29-yard field goal, 9:31. Packers 20–10. **Drive: 12 plays, 64 yards, 5:29.**
- GB – Randall Cobb 1-yard pass from Aaron Rogers (Mason Crosby kick), 4:46. Packers 27–10. **Drive: 4 plays, 40 yards, 2:15.**

**Fourth quarter**

- PIT – Najee Harris 1-yard run (Chris Boswell kick), 4:04. Packers 27–17. **Drive: 8 plays, 65 yards, 2:53.**

**Top passers**

- PIT – Ben Roethlisberger – 26/40, 232 yards, TD, INT
- GB – Aaron Rodgers – 20/36, 248 yards, 2 TD

**Top rushers**

- PIT – Najee Harris – 15 rushes, 62 yards, TD
- GB – A. J. Dillon – 15 rushes, 81 yards

**Top receivers**

- PIT – Diontae Johnson – 9 receptions, 92 yards, TD
- GB – Randall Cobb – 5 receptions, 69 yards, 2 TD

After a tough home loss, the Steelers traveled west to take on the Packers. They scored the only points in the first quarter when Ben Roethlisberger found Diontae Johnson on a 45-yard touchdown pass to make it 7–0. However, the Packers would take the lead in the second quarter by making it 14–7 by way of Aaron Rodgers' 1-yard touchdown run, followed by a 23-yard touchdown pass to Randall Cobb. The Steelers shortened the deficit to four when Chris Boswell converted a 53-yard field goal. The Packers moved up by a touchdown after Mason Crosby kicked a 26-yard field goal to make it 17–10 at halftime. In the third quarter, it was all Packers as Crosby made a 29-yard field goal, followed by Rodgers' second touchdown pass to Cobb from a yard out to make it 27–10. The Steelers scored the only points of the fourth quarter with Najee Harris's 1-yard touchdown run to make the final score 27–17.

==== Week 5: vs. Denver Broncos ====
Week 5: Denver Broncos at Pittsburgh Steelers – Game summary

Quarter	1	2	3	4	Total
Broncos	3	3	0	13	**19**
**Steelers**	7	10	7	3	**27**

at Heinz Field, Pittsburgh, Pennsylvania

- Date: October 10
- Game time: 1:00 p.m. EDT
- Game weather: Sunny, 73 °F (23 °C)
- Game attendance: 59,841
- Referee: Brad Rogers
- TV announcers (Fox): Brandon Gaudin, Mark Schlereth and Sarah Kustok
- Recap, Game Book

Game information

**First quarter**

- PIT – Diontae Johnson 50-yard pass from Ben Roethlisberger (Chris Boswell kick), 12:02. Steelers 7–0. **Drive: 6 plays, 85 yards, 2:58.**
- DEN – Brandon McManus 39-yard field goal, 1:43. Steelers 7–3. **Drive: 4 plays, 8 yards, 2:14.**

**Second quarter**

- PIT – Chris Boswell 48-yard field goal, 12:42. Steelers 10–3. **Drive: 9 plays, 45 yards, 4:01.**
- DEN – Brandon McManus 29-yard field goal, 5:47. Steelers 10–6. **Drive: 7 plays, 49 yards, 4:17.**
- PIT – Najee Harris 1-yard run (Chris Boswell kick), 2:12. Steelers 17–6. **Drive: 6 plays, 75 yards, 3:35.**

**Third quarter**

- PIT – Chase Claypool 18-yard pass from Ben Roethlisberger (Chris Boswell kick), 2:41. Steelers 24–6. **Drive: 14 plays, 86 yards, 7:16.**

**Fourth quarter**

- DEN – Kendall Hinton 2-yard pass from Teddy Bridgewater (Brandon McManus kick), 10:15. Steelers 24–13. **Drive: 14 plays, 75 yards, 7:26.**
- DEN – Courtland Sutton 39-yard pass from Teddy Bridgewater (pass failed), 5:46. Steelers 24–19. **Drive: 5 plays, 72 yards, 1:54.**
- PIT – Chris Boswell 43-yard field goal, 2:29. Steelers 27–19. **Drive: 7 plays, 49 yards, 3:17.**

**Top passers**

- DEN – Teddy Bridgewater – 24/38, 288 yards, 2 TD, INT
- PIT – Ben Roethlisberger – 15/25, 253 yards, 2 TD

**Top rushers**

- DEN – Javonte Williams – 8 rushes, 61 yards
- PIT – Najee Harris – 23 rushes, 122 yards, TD

**Top receivers**

- DEN – Courtland Sutton – 7 receptions, 120 yards, TD
- PIT – Chase Claypool – 5 receptions, 130 yards, TD

After a third straight loss, the Steelers returned home to face the Broncos. It was a back-and-forth game in which Roethlisberger posted his first game of the season with more than one touchdown pass. The game saw Pittsburgh up 24–6 at one point before Broncos quarterback Teddy Bridgewater passed for two touchdowns in the 4th quarter. The Steelers then extended their lead to 27–19 by way of Boswell's 43-yard field goal. With under a minute left, the Broncos drove down deep into Steelers' territory. Bridgewater threw the game-losing interception to cornerback James Pierre, sealing the Steelers' victory and snapping their 3-game losing skid.

Unfortunately, any celebration was muted as the team later learned the full diagnosis of the midgame injury sustained by JuJu Smith-Schuster; a dislocated shoulder from a hit delivered by Kareem Jackson, which was initially believed to have ended his season. Smith-Schuster, however, would heal quicker than originally anticipated and make a surprise recovery and return to the lineup just in time for the playoffs.

==== Week 6: vs. Seattle Seahawks ====
Week 6: Seattle Seahawks at Pittsburgh Steelers – Game summary

Quarter	1	2	3	4	OT	Total
Seahawks	0	0	14	6	0	**20**
**Steelers**	0	14	3	3	3	**23**

at Heinz Field, Pittsburgh, Pennsylvania

- Date: October 17
- Game time: 8:20 p.m. EDT
- Game weather: Mostly cloudy, 54 °F (12 °C)
- Game attendance: 60,821
- Referee: Shawn Smith
- TV announcers (NBC): Mike Tirico, Cris Collinsworth and Michele Tafoya
- Recap, Game Book

Game information

**First quarter**

- **No scoring plays.**

**Second quarter**

- PIT – Najee Harris 5-yard pass from Ben Roethlisberger (Chris Boswell kick), 10:01. Steelers 7–0. **Drive: 8 plays, 54 yards, 4:10.**
- PIT – Eric Ebron 1-yard run (Chris Boswell kick), 1:04. Steelers 14–0. **Drive: 14 plays, 84 yards, 6:59.**

**Third quarter**

- SEA – Alex Collins 2-yard run (Jason Myers kick), 9:55. Steelers 14–7. **Drive: 10 plays, 75 yards, 5:05.**
- PIT – Chris Boswell 27-yard field goal, 5:46. Steelers 17–7. **Drive: 9 plays, 66 yards, 4:09.**
- SEA – Will Dissly 1-yard pass from Geno Smith (Jason Myers kick), 3:02. Steelers 17–14. **Drive: 6 plays, 60 yards, 2:44.**

**Fourth quarter**

- SEA – Jason Myers 40-yard field goal, 12:59. Tied 17–17. **Drive: 8 plays, 36 yards, 3:26.**
- PIT – Chris Boswell 52-yard field goal, 1:30. Steelers 20–17. **Drive: 9 plays, 40 yards, 3:49.**
- SEA – Jason Myers 43-yard field goal, 0:00. Tied 20–20. **Drive: 9 plays, 50 yards, 1:30.**

**Overtime**

- PIT – Chris Boswell 37-yard field goal, 2:50. Steelers 23–20. **Drive: 3 plays, 3 yards, 1:26.**

**Top passers**

- SEA – Geno Smith – 23/32, 209 yards, TD
- PIT – Ben Roethlisberger – 29/40, 229 yards, TD

**Top rushers**

- SEA – Alex Collins – 20 rushes, 101 yards, TD
- PIT – Najee Harris – 24 rushes, 81 yards

**Top receivers**

- SEA – DK Metcalf – 6 receptions, 58 yards
- PIT – Diontae Johnson – 9 receptions, 71 yards

After a tough home win, the Steelers stayed home for a Sunday Night Football duel with the Seahawks, who would miss Russell Wilson after he suffered a finger injury the previous week. After a scoreless first quarter, the Steelers went up 14–0 at halftime in the second after Ben Roethlisberger found Najee Harris on a 5-yard touchdown pass, followed by Eric Ebron's 1-yard run for a touchdown. After the break, the Seahawks were able to get on the board in the third when Alex Collins ran for a 3-yard touchdown to make the score 14–7. Chris Boswell then increased the Steelers' lead when he kicked a 27-yard field goal to make it 17–7. The Seahawks came within 3 when Geno Smith found Will Dissly on a 1-yard touchdown pass to make the score 17–14. Then in the fourth quarter, they tied the game when Jason Myers kicked a 40-yard field goal at 17–17. The Steelers retook the lead when Boswell kicked a 52-yard field goal. However, with seconds left in regulation, Myers would kick a 43-yard field goal to tie the game at 20–20. In overtime, T. J. Watt forced a Geno Smith fumble recovered by Devin Bush that would lead to Boswell kicking the 37-yard game-winning field goal to make the final score 23–20.

==== Week 8: at Cleveland Browns ====
Week 8: Pittsburgh Steelers at Cleveland Browns – Game summary

Quarter	1	2	3	4	Total
**Steelers**	0	3	6	6	**15**
Browns	3	0	7	0	**10**

at FirstEnergy Stadium, Cleveland, Ohio

- Date: October 31
- Game time: 1:00 p.m. EDT
- Game weather: Sunny, 56 °F (13 °C)
- Game attendance: 67,431
- Referee: Shawn Hochuli
- TV announcers (CBS): Jim Nantz, Tony Romo and Tracy Wolfson
- Recap, Game Book

Game information

**First quarter**

- CLE – Chase McLaughlin 30-yard field goal, 8:09. Browns 3–0. **Drive: 13 plays, 63 yards, 6:51.**

**Second quarter**

- PIT – Chris Boswell 31-yard field goal, 9:18. Tied 3–3. **Drive: 10 plays, 47 yards, 5:36.**

**Third quarter**

- CLE – D'Ernest Johnson 10-yard run (Chase McLaughlin kick), 9:36. Browns 10–3. **Drive: 8 plays, 86 yards, 4:19.**
- PIT – Najee Harris 8-yard run (pass failed), 3:39. Browns 10–9. **Drive: 12 plays, 78 yards, 5:57.**

**Fourth quarter**

- PIT – Pat Freiermuth 2-yard pass from Ben Roethlisberger (pass failed), 11:04. Steelers 15–10. **Drive: 13 plays, 83 yards, 5:38.**

**Top passers**

- PIT – Ben Roethlisberger – 22/34, 266 yards, TD
- CLE – Baker Mayfield – 20/31, 225 yards

**Top rushers**

- PIT – Najee Harris – 26 rushes, 91 yards, TD
- CLE – Nick Chubb – 16 rushes, 61 yards

**Top receivers**

- PIT – Diontae Johnson – 6 receptions, 98 yards
- CLE – Jarvis Landry – 5 receptions, 65 yards

Coming off the bye week, the Steelers headed to Cleveland to face the Browns. In the first quarter, the Browns scored when Chase McLaughlin kicked 30-yard field goal to make it 3–0 for the quarter's only score. The Steelers tied the game up at 3–3 when Chris Boswell kicked a 31-yard field goal. After the break, the Browns would retake the lead when D'Ernest Johnson ran for a 10-yard touchdown to make it 10–3. The Steelers then came within a point later on in the quarter when Najee Harris ran for an 8-yard touchdown to make it 10–9. In the fourth quarter, the Steelers scored the only points when Ben Roethlisberger found Pat Freiermuth on a 2-yard touchdown pass (with another failed 2-point conversion) to make the eventual final score 15–10.

As of 2026, this remains the Steelers' last win in Cleveland.

==== Week 9: vs. Chicago Bears ====
Week 9: Chicago Bears at Pittsburgh Steelers – Game summary

Quarter	1	2	3	4	Total
Bears	0	3	3	21	**27**
**Steelers**	7	7	6	9	**29**

at Heinz Field, Pittsburgh, Pennsylvania

- Date: November 8
- Game time: 8:15 p.m. EST
- Game weather: Clear, 55 °F (13 °C)
- Game attendance: 60,788
- Referee: Tony Corrente
- TV announcers (ESPN): Steve Levy, Brian Griese, Louis Riddick and Lisa Salters
- Recap, Game Book

Game information

**First quarter**

- PIT – Najee Harris 10-yard run (Chris Boswell kick), 9:42. Steelers 7–0. **Drive: 6 plays, 59 yards, 3:20.**

**Second quarter**

- PIT – Pat Freiermuth 4-yard pass from Ben Roethlisberger (Chris Boswell kick), 13:22. Steelers 14–0. **Drive: 9 plays, 36 yards, 3:41.**
- CHI – Cairo Santos 30-yard field goal, 0:15. Steelers 14–3. **Drive: 12 plays, 52 yards, 4:32.**

**Third quarter**

- CHI – Cairo Santos 22-yard field goal, 7:43. Steelers 14–6. **Drive: 10 plays, 89 yards, 4:59.**
- PIT – Pat Freiermuth 10-yard pass from Ben Roethlisberger (kick failed), 2:08. Steelers 20–6. **Drive: 9 plays, 75 yards, 5:35.**

**Fourth quarter**

- CHI – Darnell Mooney 15-yard run (Cairo Santos kick), 14:17. Steelers 20–13. **Drive: 6 plays, 82 yards, 2:51.**
- PIT – Chris Boswell 54-yard field goal, 11:54. Steelers 23–13. **Drive: 4 plays, 39 yards, 2:23.**
- CHI – DeAndre Houston-Carson 25-yard fumble return (Cairo Santos kick), 6:31. Steelers 23–20.
- PIT – Chris Boswell 52-yard field goal, 2:52. Steelers 26–20. **Drive: 11 plays, 41 yards, 3:39.**
- CHI – Darnell Mooney 16-yard pass from Justin Fields (Cairo Santos kick), 1:46. Bears 27–26. **Drive: 7 plays, 75 yards, 1:06.**
- PIT – Chris Boswell 40-yard field goal, 0:26. Steelers 29–27. **Drive: 7 plays, 52 yards, 1:20.**

**Top passers**

- CHI – Justin Fields – 17/29, 291 yards, TD, INT
- PIT – Ben Roethlisberger – 21/30, 205 yards, 2 TD

**Top rushers**

- CHI – David Montgomery – 13 rushes, 63 yards
- PIT – Najee Harris – 22 rushes, 62 yards, TD

**Top receivers**

- CHI – Cole Kmet – 6 receptions, 87 yards
- PIT – Diontae Johnson – 5 receptions, 56 yards

After a tough road win, the Steelers headed home to take on the Bears. They would score the first quarter's only points when Najee Harris ran for a 10-yard touchdown. They made it 14–0 in the second when Ben Roethlisberger found Pat Freiermuth on a 4-yard touchdown pass. The Bears were able to get on the board before halftime when Cairo Santos kicked a 30-yard field goal to make the score 14–3. In the third quarter, the Bears scored again as Santos made it 14–6 with a 22-yard field goal. However, the Steelers pulled ahead by double digits as Roethlisberger and Freiermuth hooked up again on a 10-yard touchdown pass to make it 20–6. In the fourth quarter, the Bears shortened the lead to 7 when Darnell Mooney ran for a 15-yard touchdown to make it 20–13. The Steelers then pulled away as Chris Boswell kicked a 54-yard field goal to make it 23–13. The Bears then answered by coming within three when DeAndre Houston-Carson recovered a fumbled punt return by Ray-Ray McCloud and returned it 53 yards for a touchdown to make it 23–20. But the Steelers increased their lead to 26–20 when Boswell kicked a 52-yard field goal. The Bears then took the lead when Justin Fields found Mooney on a 16-yard touchdown pass to make it 27–26. But the Steelers came back to take the lead yet again when Boswell kicked a 40-yard field goal to make it 29–27. With seconds left, the Bears tried for a 65-yard field goal from Santos, however the ball would fall several yards short of the goal post and miss, sealing the win for the Steelers.

This marked the Steelers' 19 straight home win on Monday Night Football and improved their franchise record to 215–0–2 when leading by 14 or more points during the fourth quarter of a home game. This also marked the team's first win against the Bears under head coach Mike Tomlin; the Steelers lost the first three such meetings.

==== Week 10: vs. Detroit Lions ====
Week 10: Detroit Lions at Pittsburgh Steelers – Game summary

Quarter	1	2	3	4	OT	Total
Lions	0	10	6	0	0	**16**
Steelers	7	3	3	3	0	**16**

at Heinz Field, Pittsburgh, Pennsylvania

- Date: November 14
- Game time: 1:00 p.m. EST
- Game weather: Cloudy, 39 °F (4 °C)
- Game attendance: 58,716
- Referee: Land Clark
- TV announcers (Fox): Chris Myers, Daryl Johnston and Jen Hale
- Recap, Game Book

Game information

**First quarter**

- PIT – James Washington 9-yard pass from Mason Rudolph (Chris Boswell kick), 9:40. Steelers 7–0. **Drive: 10 plays, 83 yards, 5:20.**

**Second quarter**

- DET – Jermar Jefferson 28-yard run (Ryan Santoso kick), 12:43. Tied 7–7. **Drive: 3 plays, 39 yards, 1:28.**
- PIT – Chris Boswell 20-yard field goal, 4:22. Steelers 10–7. **Drive: 13 plays, 73 yards, 8:21.**
- DET – Ryan Santoso 20-yard field goal, 0:00. Tied 10–10. **Drive: 12 plays, 67 yards, 4:22.**

**Third quarter**

- DET – Godwin Igwebuike 42-yard run (kick failed, wide right), 12:09. Lions 16–10. **Drive: 6 plays, 85 yards, 2:51.**
- PIT – Chris Boswell 23-yard field goal, 8:26. Lions 16–13. **Drive: 13 plays, 69 yards, 3:43.**

**Fourth quarter**

- PIT – Chris Boswell 51-yard field goal, 11:31. Tied 16–16. **Drive: 6 plays, 17 yards, 3:21.**

**Overtime**

- No scoring plays.

**Top passers**

- DET – Jared Goff – 14/25, 114 yards
- PIT – Mason Rudolph – 30/50, 242 yards, TD, INT

**Top rushers**

- DET – D'Andre Swift – 33 rushes, 130 yards
- PIT – Najee Harris – 26 rushes, 105 yards

**Top receivers**

- DET – Amon-Ra St. Brown – 4 receptions, 61 yards
- PIT – Diontae Johnson – 7 receptions, 83 yards

After a tough win at home, the Steelers stayed home for a game against the Lions. The they scored the only points in the first quarter when Mason Rudolph found James Washington on a 9-yard touchdown pass to make it 7–0. In the second quarter, the Lions were able to tie it up at 7–7 when Jermar Jefferson ran for a 28-yard touchdown. The Steelers moved back into the lead when Chris Boswell kicked a 20-yard field goal to make it 10–7. However, the Lions would tie it up again at 10–10 when Ryan Santoso kicked a 20-yard field goal at halftime. In the third quarter, the Lions took the lead when Godwin Igwebuike ran for a 42-yard touchdown to make it 16–10, though the Steelers came within three when Boswell kicked a 23-yard field goal to make it 16–13. In the fourth quarter, the Steelers managed to tie the game up at 16–16 when Boswell kicked a 51-yard field goal. The game would go into overtime with both teams failing to score, securing a tie.

==== Week 11: at Los Angeles Chargers ====
Week 11: Pittsburgh Steelers at Los Angeles Chargers – Game summary

Quarter	1	2	3	4	Total
Steelers	3	7	0	27	**37**
**Chargers**	7	10	10	14	**41**

at SoFi Stadium, Inglewood, California

- Date: November 21
- Game time: 8:20 p.m. EST/5:20 p.m. PST
- Game weather: None (retractable roof closed)
- Game attendance: 70,240
- Referee: Carl Cheffers
- TV announcers (NBC): Al Michaels, Cris Collinsworth and Michele Tafoya
- Recap, Game Book

Game information

**First quarter**

- PIT – Chris Boswell 36-yard field goal, 8:29. Steelers 3–0. **Drive: 13 plays, 57 yards, 6:31.**
- LAC – Austin Ekeler 6-yard run (Dustin Hopkins kick), 2:09. Chargers 7–3. **Drive: 12 plays, 73 yards, 6:20.**

**Second quarter**

- LAC – Austin Ekeler 10-yard pass from Justin Herbert (Dustin Hopkins kick), 3:42. Chargers 14–3. **Drive: 12 plays, 98 yards, 6:54.**
- PIT – Diontae Johnson 10-yard pass from Ben Roethlisberger (Chris Boswell kick), 1:09. Chargers 14–10. **Drive: 7 plays, 64 yards, 2:33.**
- LAC – Dustin Hopkins 30-yard field goal, 0:02. Chargers 17–10. **Drive: 8 plays, 63 yards, 1:07.**

**Third quarter**

- LAC – Austin Ekeler 17-yard pass from Justin Herbert (Dustin Hopkins kick), 11:50. Chargers 24–10. **Drive: 6 plays, 70 yards, 3:10.**
- LAC – Dustin Hopkins 41-yard field goal, 3:40. Chargers 27–10. **Drive: 11 plays, 51 yards, 6:28.**

**Fourth quarter**

- PIT – Chris Boswell 36-yard field goal, 14:10. Chargers 27–13. **Drive: 10 plays, 57 yards, 4:30.**
- PIT – Najee Harris 1-yard run (Chris Boswell kick), 11:35. Chargers 27–20. **Drive: 4 plays, 3 yards, 0:58.**
- LAC – Austin Ekeler 5-yard run (Dustin Hopkins kick), 8:48. Chargers 34–20. **Drive: 7 plays, 75 yards, 2:47.**
- PIT – Eric Ebron 5-yard pass from Ben Roethlisberger (Chris Boswell kick), 4:49. Chargers 34–27. **Drive: 9 plays, 75 yards, 3:59.**
- PIT – Pat Freiermuth 5-yard pass from Ben Roethlisberger (Chris Boswell kick), 4:23. Tied 34–34. **Drive: 2 plays, 11 yards, 0:13.**
- PIT – Chris Boswell 45-yard field goal, 3:24. Steelers 37–34. **Drive: 4 plays, 7 yards, 0:19.**
- LAC – Mike Williams 53-yard pass from Justin Herbert (Dustin Hopkins kick), 2:09. Chargers 41–37. **Drive: 3 plays, 75 yards, 1:15.**

**Top passers**

- PIT – Ben Roethlisberger – 28/44, 273 yards, 3 TD
- LAC – Justin Herbert – 30/41, 382 yards, 3 TD, INT

**Top rushers**

- PIT – Najee Harris – 12 rushes, 39 yards, TD
- LAC – Justin Herbert – 9 rushes, 90 yards

**Top receivers**

- PIT – Diontae Johnson – 7 receptions, 101 yards, TD
- LAC – Keenan Allen – 9 receptions, 112 yards

After the tie at home against the Lions, the Steelers traveled to Los Angeles for a game against the Chargers. The Steelers were able to score 3–0 when Chris Boswell kicked a 36-yard field goal. The Chargers made it 7–3 when Austin Ekeler ran for a 6-yard touchdown. They would make it 14–3 when Justin Herbert connected with Ekeler for a 10-yard touchdown pass. The Steelers came within 4 when Ben Roethlisberger found Diontae Johnson on a 10-yard touchdown pass to make it 14–10. The Chargers moved ahead by a touchdown when Dustin Hopkins kicked a 30-yard field goal to make it 17–10 at halftime. The Chargers would add to their lead in the third quarter when Herbert and Ekeler connected again for a 17-yard touchdown pass, making the score 24–10 and then 27–10 when Hopkins kicked a 41-yard field goal. In the fourth quarter, the Steelers came closer when Boswell kicked another 36-yard field goal to make it 27–13 and then 27–20 when Najee Harris ran for a 1-yard touchdown, though the Chargers moved ahead by a couple touchdowns again when Ekeler ran for a 5-yard touchdown for a 34–20 lead. The Steelers put up 3 straight scores to take the lead: Roethlisberger found Eric Ebron on a 5-yard touchdown pass, shortening the deficit to 34–27, followed up with Roethlisberger connecting with Pat Freiermuth on a 5-yard touchdown pass to tie the game at 34–34, followed by Boswell's lead-taking 45-yard field goal to make it 37–34. However, the Chargers moved back into the lead with Herbert's 53-yard touchdown pass to Mike Williams for a 41–37 game. The Steelers got the ball back, but couldn't move the ball any further as Roethlisberger was sacked twice, sealing the Chargers' win.

==== Week 12: at Cincinnati Bengals ====
Week 12: Pittsburgh Steelers at Cincinnati Bengals – Game summary

Quarter	1	2	3	4	Total
Steelers	3	0	0	7	**10**
**Bengals**	10	21	3	7	**41**

at Paul Brown Stadium, Cincinnati, Ohio

- Date: November 28
- Game time: 1:00 p.m. EST
- Game weather: Mostly sunny, 44 °F (7 °C)
- Game attendance: 63,238
- Referee: Bill Vinovich
- TV announcers (CBS): Kevin Harlan, Trent Green and Melanie Collins
- Recap, Game Book

Game information

**First quarter**

- CIN – Joe Burrow 8-yard run (Evan McPherson kick), 9:29. Bengals 7–0. **Drive: 10 plays, 75 yards, 5:31.**
- CIN – Evan McPherson 31-yard field goal, 6:01. Bengals 10–0. **Drive: 4 plays, −8 yards, 1:55.**
- PIT – Chris Boswell 40-yard field goal, 2:17. Bengals 10–3. **Drive: 8 plays, 53 yards, 3:44.**

**Second quarter**

- CIN – Tee Higgins 32-yard pass from Joe Burrow (Evan McPherson kick), 14:15. Bengals 17–3. **Drive: 6 plays, 75 yards, 3:02.**
- CIN – Joe Mixon 1-yard run (Evan McPherson kick), 2:43. Bengals 24–3. **Drive: 14 plays, 84 yards, 7:35.**
- CIN – Mike Hilton 24-yard interception return (Evan McPherson kick), 0:30. Bengals 31–3.

**Third quarter**

- CIN – Evan McPherson 51-yard field goal, 2:35. Bengals 34–3. **Drive: 8 plays, 12 yards, 3:48.**

**Fourth quarter**

- CIN – Joe Mixon 1-yard run (Evan McPherson kick), 13:10. Bengals 41–3. **Drive: 5 plays, 65 yards, 2:57.**
- PIT – Pat Freiermuth 15-yard pass from Ben Roethlisberger (Chris Boswell kick), 2:59. Bengals 41–10. **Drive: 9 plays, 69 yards, 3:12.**

**Top passers**

- PIT – Ben Roethlisberger – 24/41, 263 yards, TD, 2 INT
- CIN – Joe Burrow – 20/24, 190 yards, TD, INT

**Top rushers**

- PIT – Najee Harris – 8 rushes, 23 yards
- CIN – Joe Mixon – 28 rushes, 165 yards, 2 TD

**Top receivers**

- PIT – Diontae Johnson – 9 receptions, 95 yards
- CIN – Tee Higgins – 6 receptions, 114 yards, TD

After a tough loss, the Steelers visited Cincinnati to take on the Bengals. The Bengals scored first when Joe Burrow ran for an 8-yard touchdown to make it 7–0. They made it 10–0 when Evan McPherson kicked a 31-yard field goal. The Steelers got on the board later on when Chris Boswell kicked a 40-yard field goal to make it 10–3, though the Bengals would score 31 consecutive points to make it 41–3, before Ben Roethlisberger found Pat Freiermuth on a 15-yard touchdown pass to make the final score 41–10.

This marked the first time the Steelers were swept by the Bengals since 2009. The 31-point deficit is the largest margin of loss against Cincinnati since Week 2 of 1989, which also ended with a final score of 41–10.

==== Week 13: vs. Baltimore Ravens ====
Week 13: Baltimore Ravens at Pittsburgh Steelers – Game summary

Quarter	1	2	3	4	Total
Ravens	0	7	3	9	**19**
**Steelers**	0	3	0	17	**20**

at Heinz Field, Pittsburgh, Pennsylvania

- Date: December 5
- Game time: 4:25 p.m. EST
- Game weather: Cloudy, 50 °F (10 °C)
- Game attendance: 59,303
- Referee: Scott Novak
- TV announcers (CBS): Jim Nantz, Tony Romo and Tracy Wolfson
- Recap, Game Book

Game information

**First quarter**

- No scoring plays.

**Second quarter**

- BAL – Devonta Freeman 3-yard run (Justin Tucker kick), 8:37. Ravens 7–0. **Drive: 16 plays, 99 yards, 10:27.**
- PIT – Chris Boswell 53-yard field goal, 0:27. Ravens 7–3. **Drive: 9 plays, 52 yards, 1:21.**

**Third quarter**

- BAL – Justin Tucker 35-yard field goal, 7:24. Ravens 10–3. **Drive: 10 plays, 41 yards, 5:20.**

**Fourth quarter**

- PIT – Diontae Johnson 29-yard pass from Ben Roethlisberger (kick failed), 14:01. Ravens 10–9. **Drive: 4 plays, 78 yards, 1:38.**
- BAL – Justin Tucker 28-yard field goal, 11:51. Ravens 13–9. **Drive: 5 plays, 51 yards, 2:10.**
- PIT – Chris Boswell 43-yard field goal, 7:18. Ravens 13–12. **Drive: 10 plays, 50 yards, 4:33.**
- PIT – Diontae Johnson 5-yard pass from Ben Roethlisberger (Ben Roethlisberger–Pat Freiermuth pass), 1:48. Steelers 20–13. **Drive: 11 plays, 69 yards, 4:33.**
- BAL – Sammy Watkins 5-yard pass from Lamar Jackson (pass failed), 0:12. Steelers 20–19. **Drive: 8 plays, 60 yards, 1:36.**

**Top passers**

- BAL – Lamar Jackson – 23/37, 253 yards, TD, INT
- PIT – Ben Roethlisberger – 21/31, 236 yards, 2 TD

**Top rushers**

- BAL – Lamar Jackson – 8 rushes, 55 yards
- PIT – Najee Harris – 21 rushes, 71 yards

**Top receivers**

- BAL – Marquise Brown – 5 receptions, 55 yards
- PIT – Diontae Johnson – 8 receptions, 105 yards, 2 TD

After being swept by the Bengals, the Steelers returned home to face the Ravens. After a scoreless first quarter, the Ravens scored first when Devonta Freeman ran for a 3-yard touchdown to make it 7–0. Chris Boswell was able to get the Steelers on the board at halftime when he kicked a 53-yard field goal to make it 7–3. In the third quarter, the Ravens scored the only points when Justin Tucker kicked a 35-yard field goal, putting his team up 10–3. In the fourth quarter, the Steelers came within a point when Ben Roethlisberger found Diontae Johnson on a 26-yard touchdown pass to make it 10–9, though the Ravens made it a 4-point game when Tucker kicked a 28-yard field to make it 13–9. The Steelers then scored twice to take a 20–13 lead after Boswell kicked a 43-yard field goal and then Roethlisberger connected with Johnson again on a 5-yard touchdown pass. The Ravens then made it 20–19 when Lamar Jackson found Sammy Watkins on a 6-yard touchdown pass. The Ravens then attempted an onside kick, but it would be recovered by the Steelers, sealing the victory.

==== Week 14: at Minnesota Vikings ====
Week 14: Pittsburgh Steelers at Minnesota Vikings – Game summary

Quarter	1	2	3	4	Total
Steelers	0	0	7	21	**28**
**Vikings**	6	17	6	7	**36**

at U.S. Bank Stadium, Minneapolis, Minnesota

- Date: December 9
- Game time: 8:20 p.m. EST/7:20 p.m. CST
- Game weather: None (indoor stadium)
- Game attendance: 66,718
- Referee: Clete Blakeman
- TV announcers (Fox/NFLN/Prime Video): Joe Buck, Troy Aikman, Erin Andrews and Kristina Pink
- Recap, Game Book

Game information

**First quarter**

- MIN – Justin Jefferson 14-yard pass from Kirk Cousins (kick failed), 3:31. Vikings 6–0. **Drive: 5 plays, 61 yards, 2:01.**

**Second quarter**

- MIN – Greg Joseph 38-yard field goal, 14:43. Vikings 9–0. **Drive: 7 plays, 37 yards, 2:02.**
- MIN – Dalvin Cook 29-yard run (Greg Joseph kick), 9:55. Vikings 16–0. **Drive: 5 plays, 78 yards, 3:06.**
- MIN – Dalvin Cook 7-yard run (Greg Joseph kick), 2:20. Vikings 23–0. **Drive: 12 plays, 60 yards, 5:19.**

**Third quarter**

- MIN – Greg Joseph 42-yard field goal, 9:36. Vikings 26–0. **Drive: 7 plays, 10 yards, 2:49.**
- MIN – Greg Joseph 25-yard field goal, 6:15. Vikings 29–0. **Drive: 6 plays, 23 yards, 2:07.**
- PIT – Najee Harris 3-yard pass from Ben Roethlisberger (Chris Boswell kick), 2:11. Vikings 29–7. **Drive: 10 plays, 75 yards, 4:04.**

**Fourth quarter**

- PIT – Najee Harris 1-yard run (Chris Boswell kick), 14:49. Vikings 29–14. **Drive: 7 plays, 42 yards, 2:14.**
- PIT – James Washington 30-yard pass from Ben Roethlisberger (pass failed), 12:11. Vikings 29–20. **Drive: 3 plays, 69 yards, 1:06.**
- MIN – K. J. Osborn 62-yard pass from Kirk Cousins (Greg Joseph kick), 10:51. Vikings 36–20. **Drive: 3 plays, 75 yards, 1:20.**
- PIT – Pat Freiermuth 15-yard pass from Ben Roethlisberger (Ben Roethlisberger–Diontae Johnson pass), 4:14. Vikings 36–28. **Drive: 2 plays, 21 yards, 0:44.**

**Top passers**

- PIT – Ben Roethlisberger – 28/40, 308 yards, 3 TD, INT
- MIN – Kirk Cousins – 14/31, 216 yards, 2 TD, 2 INT

**Top rushers**

- PIT – Najee Harris – 20 rushes, 94 yards, TD
- MIN – Dalvin Cook – 27 rushes, 205 yards, 2 TD

**Top receivers**

- PIT – Chase Claypool – 8 receptions, 93 yards
- MIN – K.J. Osborn – 3 receptions, 83 yards, TD

After a tough home win over the Ravens, the Steelers traveled to Minneapolis for a Thursday Night Football game against the Vikings. The Vikings jumped out to a 29–0 lead in the first three quarters before the Steelers scored three times in a row to make it 29–20. Kirk Cousins then found K. J. Osborn on a 62-yard touchdown pass to make it 36–20. The Steelers scored the final points of the game when Ben Roethlisberger found Pat Freiermuth on a 15-yard touchdown pass to make the final score 36–28. However, the Steelers final drive ended in an incompletion allowing the Vikings to escape with the win.

==== Week 15: vs. Tennessee Titans ====
Week 15: Tennessee Titans at Pittsburgh Steelers – Game summary

Quarter	1	2	3	4	Total
Titans	10	3	0	0	**13**
**Steelers**	0	3	7	9	**19**

at Heinz Field, Pittsburgh, Pennsylvania

- Date: December 19
- Game time: 1:00 p.m. EST
- Game weather: Cloudy, 34 °F (1 °C)
- Game attendance: 59,521
- Referee: Brad Rogers
- TV announcers (CBS): Jim Nantz, Tony Romo and Tracy Wolfson
- Recap, Game Book

Game information

**First quarter**

- TEN – Ryan Tannehill 1-yard run (Randy Bullock kick), 7:41. Titans 7–0. **Drive: 6 plays, 25 yards, 2:29.**
- TEN – Randy Bullock 26-yard field goal, 1:13. Titans 10–0. **Drive: 11 plays, 45 yards, 4:54.**

**Second quarter**

- PIT – Chris Boswell 36-yard field goal, 10:35. Titans 10–3. **Drive: 5 plays, 18 yards, 2:11.**
- TEN – Randy Bullock 32-yard field goal, 0:18. Titans 13–3. **Drive: 19 plays, 64 yards, 10:17.**

**Third quarter**

- PIT – Ben Roethlisberger 1-yard run (Chris Boswell kick), 3:08. Titans 13–10. **Drive: 8 plays, 63 yards, 3:59.**

**Fourth quarter**

- PIT – Chris Boswell 28-yard field goal, 13:24. Tied 13–13. **Drive: 7 plays, 31 yards, 2:26.**
- PIT – Chris Boswell 46-yard field goal, 7:20. Steelers 16–13. **Drive: 4 plays, 4 yards, 1:56.**
- PIT – Chris Boswell 48-yard field goal, 4:29. Steelers 19–13. **Drive: 4 plays, 5 yards, 2:07.**

**Top passers**

- TEN – Ryan Tannehill – 23/32, 153 yards, INT
- PIT – Ben Roethlisberger – 16/25, 148 yards

**Top rushers**

- TEN – D'Onta Foreman – 22 rushes, 108 yards
- PIT – Najee Harris – 12 rushes, 18 yards

**Top receivers**

- TEN – Nick Westbrook-Ikhine – 4 receptions, 32 yards
- PIT – Diontae Johnson – 5 receptions, 38 yards

After another tough loss, the Steelers headed home for a game against the Titans. In the first quarter, the Titans made it 10–0 with Ryan Tannehill's 1-yard touchdown run followed by Randy Bullock's 26-yard field goal. In the second quarter, the Steelers managed to get on the board when Chris Boswell kicked a 36-yard field goal to make it 10–3. The Titans went up 13–3 before halftime when Bullock kicked a 32-yard field goal. In the second half, it was all Steelers, with a Ben Roethlisberger 1-yard rushing touchdown and three more Boswell field goals, making the final score 19–13.

==== Week 16: at Kansas City Chiefs ====
Week 16: Pittsburgh Steelers at Kansas City Chiefs – Game summary

Quarter	1	2	3	4	Total
Steelers	0	0	3	7	**10**
**Chiefs**	14	9	7	6	**36**

at Arrowhead Stadium, Kansas City, Missouri

- Date: December 26
- Game time: 4:25 p.m. EST/3:25 p.m. CST
- Game weather: 57 °F (14 °C)
- Game attendance: 73,371
- Referee: Jerome Boger
- TV announcers (CBS): Jim Nantz, Tony Romo and Tracy Wolfson
- Recap, Game Book

Game information

**First quarter**

- KC – Clyde Edwards-Helaire 7-yard run (Elliott Fry kick), 4:07. Chiefs 7–0. **Drive: 14 plays, 73 yards, 8:10.**
- KC – Byron Pringle 5-yard pass from Patrick Mahomes (Elliott Fry kick), 1:05. Chiefs 14–0. **Drive: 6 plays, 49 yards, 2:54.**

**Second quarter**

- KC – Elliott Fry 44-yard field goal, 8:45. Chiefs 17–0. **Drive: 10 plays, 54 yards, 5:01.**
- KC – Mecole Hardman 8-yard pass from Patrick Mahomes (kick failed), 2:13. Chiefs 23–0. **Drive: 6 plays, 74 yards, 2:50.**

**Third quarter**

- KC – Byron Pringle 16-yard pass from Patrick Mahomes (Elliott Fry kick), 8:53. Chiefs 30–0. **Drive: 7 plays, 51 yards, 3:51.**
- PIT – Chris Boswell 34-yard field goal, 3:34. Chiefs 30–3. **Drive: 15 plays, 54 yards, 5:19.**

**Fourth quarter**

- KC – Elliott Fry 34-yard field goal, 11:57. Chiefs 33–3. **Drive: 12 plays, 59 yards, 6:37.**
- KC – Elliott Fry 30-yard field goal, 9:41. Chiefs 36–3. **Drive: 4 plays, −5 yards, 2:02.**
- PIT – Diontae Johnson 15-yard pass from Ben Roethlisberger (Chris Boswell kick), 2:54. Chiefs 36–10. **Drive: 17 plays, 85 yards, 6:47.**

**Top passers**

- PIT – Ben Roethlisberger – 23/35, 159 yards, TD, INT
- KC – Patrick Mahomes – 23/30, 258 yards, 3 TD

**Top rushers**

- PIT – Najee Harris – 19 rushes, 93 yards
- KC – Darrel Williams – 11 rushes, 55 yards

**Top receivers**

- PIT – Diontae Johnson – 6 receptions, 51 yards, TD
- KC – Byron Pringle – 6 receptions, 75 yards, 2 TD

After a tough win at home, the Steelers traveled to take on the Chiefs. Throughout the first 3 quarters, the Chiefs managed to jump out to a 30–0 lead before the Steelers finally got on the board when Chris Boswell kicked a 34-yard field goal with 3:34 remaining in the third. In the fourth quarter, the Chiefs then scored a couple more field goals from Elliot Fry: from 34 and 30 yards out to make it 36–3. Ben Roethlisberger then found Diontae Johnson on a 15-yard touchdown pass to make the final score 36–10.

==== Week 17: vs. Cleveland Browns ====
Week 17: Cleveland Browns at Pittsburgh Steelers – Game summary

Quarter	1	2	3	4	Total
Browns	0	0	7	7	**14**
**Steelers**	0	10	3	13	**26**

at Heinz Field, Pittsburgh, Pennsylvania

- Date: January 3
- Game time: 8:15 p.m. EST
- Game weather: Cloudy, 27 °F (−3 °C)
- Game attendance: 63,624
- Referee: Brad Allen
- TV announcers (ESPN): Steve Levy, Brian Griese, Louis Riddick, Lisa Salters, and John Parry
- Recap, Game Book

Game information

**First quarter**

- No scoring plays.

**Second quarter**

- PIT – Diontae Johnson 5-yard pass from Ben Roethlisberger (Chris Boswell kick), 10:39. Steelers 7–0. **Drive: 10 plays, 66 yards, 4:14.**
- PIT – Chris Boswell 22-yard field goal, 3:02. Steelers 10–0. **Drive: 11 plays, 39 yards, 4:01.**

**Third quarter**

- PIT – Chris Boswell 30-yard field goal, 8:20. Steelers 13–0. **Drive: 11 plays, 66 yards, 4:16.**
- CLE – David Njoku 3-yard pass from Baker Mayfield (Chase McLaughlin kick), 0:56. Steelers 13–7. **Drive: 4 plays, 48 yards, 2:02.**

**Fourth quarter**

- PIT – Chris Boswell 50-yard field goal, 9:46. Steelers 16–7. **Drive: 8 plays, 25 yards, 3:50.**
- PIT – Chris Boswell 48-yard field goal, 5:48. Steelers 19–7. **Drive: 4 plays, 7 yards, 1:35.**
- CLE – Harrison Bryant 1-yard pass from Baker Mayfield (Chase McLaughlin kick), 1:10. Steelers 19–14. **Drive: 17 plays, 76 yards, 4:38.**
- PIT – Najee Harris 37-yard run (Chris Boswell kick), 0:51. Steelers 26–14. **Drive: 3 plays, 45 yards, 0:19.**

**Top passers**

- CLE – Baker Mayfield – 16/38, 185 yards, 2 TD, 2 INT
- PIT – Ben Roethlisberger – 24/46, 123 yards, TD, INT

**Top rushers**

- CLE – Nick Chubb – 12 rushes, 58 yards
- PIT – Najee Harris – 28 rushes, 188 yards, TD

**Top receivers**

- CLE – Donovan Peoples-Jones – 3 receptions, 76 yards
- PIT – Ray-Ray McCloud – 4 receptions, 35 yards

After a tough road loss, the Steelers headed home to play the Browns. After a scoreless first quarter, the Steelers were able to get on the board in the second after Ben Roethlisberger and Diontae Johnson connected on a 5-yard touchdown pass to make it 7–0. They would make it 10–0 at halftime when Chris Boswell kicked a 22-yard field goal. In the third quarter, the Steelers went up 13–0 after Boswell kicked a 30-yard field goal. The Browns got on the board later on in the quarter, when Baker Mayfield found David Njoku on a 3-yard touchdown pass to make it 13–7. The Steelers however, pulled away again as Boswell kicked a couple field goals: from 50 and 48 yards out to make the score 19–7. The Browns then shortened the lead to 5 when Mayfield found Harrison Bryant on a 1-yard touchdown pass to make the score 19–14. However, the Steelers were able to secure the victory when Najee Harris ran for a 37-yard touchdown, making the final score 26-14. The game was significant for reasons outside of the playoff hunt, as it was widely expected to be the last home game for QB Ben Roethlisberger. Throughout the game, the Heinz Field crowd broke out in chants for Roethlisberger, who gave an emotional interview after the game and circled the field thanking the fans before leaving with his family.

This marked the first time the Steelers swept the Browns since 2017.

==== Week 18: at Baltimore Ravens ====
Week 18: Pittsburgh Steelers at Baltimore Ravens – Game summary

Quarter	1	2	3	4	OT	Total
**Steelers**	3	0	3	7	3	**16**
Ravens	0	3	7	3	0	**13**

at M&T Bank Stadium, Baltimore, Maryland

- Date: January 9
- Game time: 1:00 p.m. EST
- Game weather: Rain, 38 °F (3 °C)
- Game attendance: 70,453
- Referee: Shawn Hochuli
- TV announcers (CBS): Ian Eagle, Charles Davis and Evan Washburn
- Recap, Game Book

Game information

**First quarter**

- PIT – Chris Boswell 28-yard field goal, 6:06. Steelers 3–0 . **Drive: 7 plays, 29 yards, 3:51.**

**Second quarter**

- BAL – Justin Tucker 24-yard field goal, 0:11. Tied 3–3 . **Drive: 8 plays, 34 yards, 1:35.**

**Third quarter**

- BAL – Latavius Murray 46-yard run (Justin Tucker kick), 12:32. Ravens 10–3. **Drive: 5 plays, 68 yards, 2:28.**
- PIT – Chris Boswell 40-yard field goal, 7:41. Ravens 10–6 . **Drive: 8 plays, 50 yards, 4:51.**

**Fourth quarter**

- PIT – Chase Claypool 6-yard pass from Ben Roethlisberger (Chris Boswell kick), 2:54. Steelers 13–10. **Drive: 10 plays, 50 yards, 5:13.**
- BAL – Justin Tucker 46-yard field goal, 1:13. Tied 13–13 . **Drive: 7 plays, 40 yards, 1:41.**

**Overtime**

- PIT – Chris Boswell 36-yard field goal, 1:56. Steelers 16–13 . **Drive: 15 plays, 65 yards, 4:28.**

**Top passers**

- PIT – Ben Roethlisberger – 22/32, 244 yards, TD, INT
- BAL – Tyler Huntley – 16/31, 141 yards, 2 INT

**Top rushers**

- PIT – Chase Claypool – 3 rushes, 33 yards
- BAL – Latavius Murray – 16 rushes, 150 yards, TD

**Top receivers**

- PIT – Pat Freiermuth – 6 receptions, 53 yards
- BAL – Mark Andrews – 8 receptions, 85 yards

The Steelers ended their season with a road game against the Ravens. In the first quarter, the Steelers scored the only points when Chris Boswell kicked a 28-yard field goal to make it 3–0. The Ravens tied it up at 3–3 in the second quarter when Justin Tucker kicked a 24-yard field goal. In the third quarter, the Ravens moved into the lead when Latavius Murray ran for a 46-yard touchdown to make it 10–3. The Steelers then came within four when Boswell kicked a 40-yard field goal, making the score 10–6. The Steelers retook the lead in the fourth quarter when Ben Roethlisberger found Chase Claypool on a 6-yard touchdown pass to make it 13–10. Tucker then tied the game up at 13–13 with a 46-yard field goal. In overtime, the Steelers were able to drive down the field and eventually Boswell was brought out to kick the game-winning 36-yard field goal, making the final score 16–13. Head coach Mike Tomlin recorded his 162nd win with the Steelers, surpassing his predecessor Bill Cowher to become the 2nd winningest head coach in franchise history, only behind Chuck Noll, who coached the team from 1969 to 1991.

With the win, the Steelers eliminated the Ravens from playoff contention, clinching a playoff berth due to the Jaguars' defeat of the Colts and the Raiders' defeat of the Chargers on Sunday Night Football.

=== Standings ===
==== Division ====
AFC North
	W	L	T	PCT	DIV	CONF	PF	PA	STK
^{(4)} Cincinnati Bengals	10	7	0	.588	4–2	8–4	460	376	L1
^{(7)} Pittsburgh Steelers	9	7	1	.559	4–2	7–5	343	398	W2
Cleveland Browns	8	9	0	.471	3–3	5–7	349	371	W1
Baltimore Ravens	8	9	0	.471	1–5	5–7	387	392	L6

==== Conference ====
AFC
#	Team	Division	W	L	T	PCT	DIV	CONF	SOS	SOV	STK
**Division winners**
1 (Note: Tennessee finished ahead of Kansas City based on head-to-head victory, claiming the No. 1 seed.)	Tennessee Titans	South	12	5	0	.706	5–1	8–4	.472	.480	W3
2	Kansas City Chiefs	West	12	5	0	.706	5–1	7–5	.538	.517	W1
3	Buffalo Bills	East	11	6	0	.647	5–1	7–5	.472	.428	W4
4	Cincinnati Bengals	North	10	7	0	.588	4–2	8–4	.472	.462	L1
**Wild cards**
5 (Note: Las Vegas claimed the No. 5 seed over New England based on win percentage in common games (5–1 vs. 2–4 against: Miami, Dallas, LA Chargers, Cleveland, and Indianapolis).)	Las Vegas Raiders	West	10	7	0	.588	3–3	8–4	.510	.515	W4
6	New England Patriots	East	10	7	0	.588	3–3	8–4	.481	.394	L1
7	Pittsburgh Steelers	North	9	7	1	.559	4–2	7–5	.521	.490	W2
**Did not qualify for the postseason**
8 (Note: Indianapolis finished ahead of Miami and Los Angeles based on conference record (7–5 vs. 6–6).)	Indianapolis Colts	South	9	8	0	.529	3–3	7–5	.495	.431	L2
9 (Note: Miami finished ahead of LA Chargers based on win percentage in common games (5–1 vs. 2–4 against: New England, Las Vegas, Houston, Baltimore, and NY Giants).)	Miami Dolphins	East	9	8	0	.529	4–2	6–6	.464	.379	W1
10	Los Angeles Chargers	West	9	8	0	.529	3–3	6–6	.510	.500	L1
11 (Note: Cleveland finished ahead of Baltimore based on division record (3–3 vs. 1–5).)	Cleveland Browns	North	8	9	0	.471	3–3	5–7	.514	.415	W1
12	Baltimore Ravens	North	8	9	0	.471	1–5	5–7	.531	.460	L6
13	Denver Broncos	West	7	10	0	.412	1–5	3–9	.484	.357	L4
14 (Note: NY Jets finished ahead of Houston based on head-to-head victory.)	New York Jets	East	4	13	0	.235	0–6	4–8	.512	.426	L2
15	Houston Texans	South	4	13	0	.235	3–3	4–8	.498	.397	L2
16	Jacksonville Jaguars	South	3	14	0	.176	1–5	3–9	.512	.569	W1
**Tiebreakers** (Note: When breaking ties for three or more teams under the NFL's rules, they are first broken within divisions, then comparing only the highest-ranked remaining team from each division.)

== Postseason ==
=== Schedule ===
Round	Date	Opponent (seed)	Result	Record	Venue	Recap
Wild Card	January 16	at Kansas City Chiefs (2)	L 21–42	0–1	Arrowhead Stadium	Recap

=== Game summaries ===
==== AFC Wild Card Playoffs: at (2) Kansas City Chiefs ====
AFC Wild Card Playoffs: (7) Pittsburgh Steelers at (2) Kansas City Chiefs – Game summary

Quarter	1	2	3	4	Total
Steelers	0	7	7	7	21
Chiefs	0	21	14	7	42

at Arrowhead Stadium, Kansas City, Missouri

- Date: January 16, 2022
- Game time: 8:15 p.m. EST/7:15 p.m. CST
- Game weather: 30 °F (−1 °C)
- Game attendance: 73,253
- Referee: Shawn Smith
- TV announcers (NBC): Al Michaels, Cris Collinsworth, and Michele Tafoya
- Recap, Game Book

Game information

First quarter

- No scoring plays.

Second quarter

- PIT – T. J. Watt 26-yard fumble return (Chris Boswell kick), 10:41. Steelers 7–0.
- KC – Jerick McKinnon 4-yard pass from Patrick Mahomes (Harrison Butker kick), 5:45. Tied 7–7. Drive: 8 plays, 76 yards, 4:56.
- KC – Byron Pringle 12-yard pass from Patrick Mahomes (Harrison Butker kick), 1:55. Chiefs 14–7. Drive: 7 plays, 74 yards, 2:43.
- KC – Travis Kelce 48-yard pass from Patrick Mahomes (Harrison Butker kick), 0:13. Chiefs 21–7. Drive: 6 plays, 80 yards, 0:39.

Third quarter

- KC – Nick Allegretti 1-yard pass from Patrick Mahomes (Harrison Butker kick), 10:13. Chiefs 28–7. Drive: 9 plays, 68 yards, 4:47.
- KC – Tyreek Hill 31-yard pass from Patrick Mahomes (Harrison Butker kick), 9:14. Chiefs 35–7. Drive: 2 plays, 29 yards, 0:42.
- PIT – Diontae Johnson 13-yard pass from Ben Roethlisberger (Chris Boswell kick), 4:10. Chiefs 35–14. Drive: 10 plays, 75 yards, 5:04.

Fourth quarter

- KC – Byron Pringle 2-yard pass from Travis Kelce (Harrison Butker kick), 14:13. Chiefs 42–14. Drive: 9 plays, 75 yards, 4:57.
- PIT – James Washington 15-yard pass from Ben Roethlisberger (Chris Boswell kick), 7:36. Chiefs 42–21. Drive: 15 plays, 75 yards, 6:37.

Top passers

- PIT – Ben Roethlisberger – 29/44, 215 yards, 2 TD
- KC – Patrick Mahomes – 30/39, 404 yards, 5 TD, INT

Top rushers

- PIT – Najee Harris – 12 rushes, 29 yards
- KC – Jerick McKinnon – 12 rushes, 61 yards

Top receivers

- PIT – Diontae Johnson – 5 receptions, 34 yards, TD
- KC – Jerick McKinnon – 6 receptions, 81 yards, TD

In quarterback Ben Roethlisberger's final NFL game, the #7 seeded Steelers traveled to take on the second seed Chiefs. Both teams would go scoreless in the first quarter before the Steelers scored first in the second quarter with T. J. Watt's 26-yard fumble return for a touchdown. However, the Chiefs scored three straight touchdowns before halftime, making it 21–7. In the third quarter, they made it 35–7 after a couple more touchdowns. The Steelers shortened the lead to 21 when Ben Roethlisberger found Diontae Johnson on a 13-yard touchdown pass, making it 35–14. The Chiefs then pulled away when Travis Kelce threw a 2-yard touchdown pass to Byron Pringle to make it 42–14. The Steelers then scored the remaining 7 points from Roethlisberger to James Washington to make the final score 42–21.

== Statistics ==
=== Team ===
Category	Total yards	Yards per game	NFL rank (out of 32)
Passing offense	3,778	222.2	15th
Rushing offense	1,583	93.1	29th
Total offense	5,361	315.4	23rd
Passing defense	3,656	215.1	9th
Rushing defense	2,483	146.1	32nd
Total defense	6,139	361.1	24th

=== Individual ===
Category	Player	Total yards
Offense
Passing	Ben Roethlisberger	3,740
Rushing	Najee Harris	1,200
Receiving	Diontae Johnson	1,161
Defense
Tackles (Solo)	Minkah Fitzpatrick	84
Sacks	T. J. Watt	22.5
Interceptions	Ahkello Witherspoon	3

Statistics correct as of the end of the 2021 NFL season
