= 1978 Big Ten Conference football season =

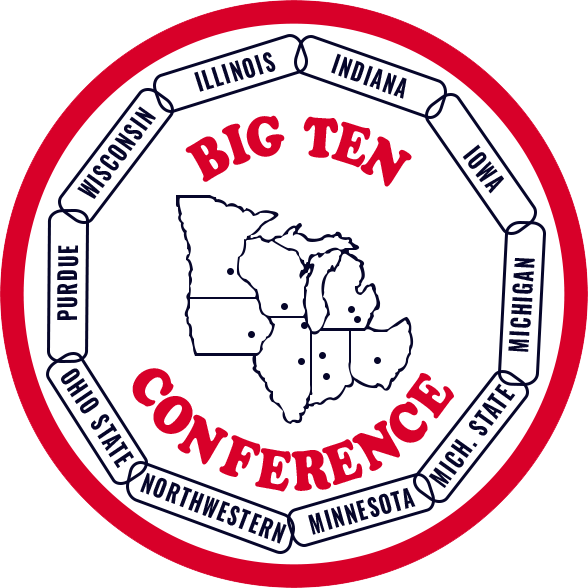
- Sport: American football
- Teams: 10
- Top draft pick: Tom Cousineau
- Co-champions: Michigan, Michigan State
- Runners-up: Purdue
- Season MVP: Rick Leach

Seasons

1978 Big Ten Conference football standings
	Conf.					Overall
Team	W		L		T	W		L		T
No. 5 Michigan +	7	–	1	–	0	10	–	2	–	0
No. 12 Michigan State +	7	–	1	–	0	8	–	3	–	0
No. 13 Purdue	6	–	1	–	1	9	–	2	–	1
Ohio State	6	–	2	–	0	7	–	4	–	1
Minnesota	4	–	4	–	0	5	–	6	–	0
Wisconsin	3	–	4	–	2	5	–	4	–	2
Indiana	3	–	5	–	0	4	–	7	–	0
Iowa	2	–	6	–	0	2	–	9	–	0
Illinois	0	–	6	–	2	1	–	8	–	2
Northwestern	0	–	8	–	1	0	–	10	–	1
+ – Conference co-champions; Rankings from AP Poll

The 1978 Big Ten Conference football season was the 83rd season of college football played by the member schools of the Big Ten Conference and was a part of the 1978 NCAA Division I-A football season.

The 1978 Michigan Wolverines football team, under head coach Bo Schembechler, compiled a 10–2 record, tied with Michigan State for the Big Ten championship, led the conference in scoring defense (8.8 points allowed per game), lost to national champion USC in the Rose Bowl, and was ranked No. 5 in the final AP and UPI polls. Quarterback Rick Leach won the Chicago Tribune Silver Football as the most valuable player in the Big Ten, finished third in the voting for the Heisman Trophy, and was selected as a first-team All-American by the American Football Coaches Association.

The 1978 Michigan State Spartans football team, under head coach Darryl Rogers, compiled an 8–3, tied with Michigan for the conference championship, led the conference in scoring offense (37.4 points per game), and was ranked No. 12 in the final AP Poll. Ed Smith led the conference with 2,226 passing yards and Kirk Gibson led the conference with 806 receiving yards. Gibson was selected as a first-team All-American by the Associated Press, Newspaper Enterprise Association, and The Sporting News. Tight end Mark Brammer was selected as a first-team All-American by the Football Writers Association of America.

The 1978 Purdue Boilermakers football team, under head coach Jim Young, compiled a 9–2–1 record, finished in third place in the Big Ten, defeated Georgia Tech in the 1978 Peach Bowl, and was ranked No. 13 in the final AP and UPI polls. Jim Young was named Big Ten Coach of the Year. Quarterback Mark Herrmann passed for 1,904 yards, and defensive lineman Keena Turner was selected as the team's most valuable player.

Ohio State linebacker Tom Cousineau's was selected as a consensus first-team All-American and was the first player selected in the 1979 NFL draft. Minnesota running back Marion Barber, Jr. led the conference with 1,210 rushing yards, and Ohio State quarterback Art Schlichter led the conference in scoring with 78 points on 13 rushing touchdowns. Ohio State coach Woody Hayes was fired after punching a Clemson player in the closing minutes of the 1978 Gator Bowl.

== Season overview ==
=== Results and team statistics ===
Conf. Rank	Team	Head coach	AP final	AP high	Overall record	Conf. record	PPG	PAG	MVP
1 (tie)	Michigan	Bo Schembechler	#5	#3	10–2	7–1	31.0	**8.8**	**Rick Leach**
1 (tie)	Michigan State	Darryl Rogers	#12	#12	8–3	7–1	**37.4**	15.5	Ed Smith
3	Purdue	Jim Young	#13	#12	9–2–1	6–1–1	21.8	10.8	Keena Turner
4	Ohio State	Woody Hayes	NR	#6	7–4–1	6–2	28.3	18.0	Tom Cousineau
5	Minnesota	Cal Stoll	NR	NR	5–6	4–4	19.1	24.3	Marion Barber, Jr.
6	Wisconsin	Dave McClain	NR	NR	5–4–2	3–4–2	20.3	25.2	Mike Kalasmiki
7	Indiana	Lee Corso	NR	NR	4–7	3–5	20.7	26.4	Joe Norman
8	Iowa	Bob Commings	NR	NR	2–9	2–6	11.4	26.5	Brad Reid
9	Illinois	Gary Moeller	NR	NR	1–8–2	0–6–2	9.4	28.8	John Sullivan
10	Northwestern	Rick Venturi	NR	NR	0–10–1	0–8–1	8.4	40.0	Pat Geegan

Key
AP final = Team's rank in the final AP Poll of the 1978 season
AP high = Team's highest rank in the AP Poll throughout the 1978 season
PPG = Average of points scored per game; conference leader's average displayed in bold
PAG = Average of points allowed per game; conference leader's average displayed in bold
MVP = Most valuable player as voted by players on each team as part of the voting process to determine the winner of the Chicago Tribune Silver Football trophy; trophy winner in bold

=== Regular season ===
==== September 16 ====
On September 16, 1978, the Big Ten football teams opened the season with three conference games and four non-conference games. The non-conference games resulted in two wins and two losses.

- Michigan 31, Illinois 0
- Purdue 21, Michigan State 14
- Iowa 20, Northwestern 3
- Penn State 19, Ohio State 0
- Minnesota 38, Toledo 12
- Wisconsin 7, Richmond 6
- LSU 24, Indiana 17

==== September 23 ====
On September 23, 1978, the Big Ten teams played two conference games and six non-conference games. The non-conference games resulted in four wins and two losses, giving the Big Ten a 6–4 non-conference record to that point in the season.

- Ohio State 27, Minnesota 10
- Wisconsin 28, Northwestern 7
- Michigan 28, Notre Dame 14
- Michigan State 49, Syracuse 21
- Purdue 24, Ohio 0
- Indiana 14, Washington 7
- Iowa State 31, Iowa 0
- Stanford 35, Illinois 10

==== September 29–30 ====
On September 29 and 30, 1978, the Big Ten teams played 10 non-conference games, resulting in four wins and six losses, giving the Big Ten a 10–10 non-conference record to that point in the season.

- Michigan 52, Duke 0
- USC 30, Michigan State 9 (game played Friday, September 29)
- Notre Dame 10, Purdue 6
- Ohio State 34, Baylor 28
- UCLA 17, Minnesota 3
- Wisconsin 22, Oregon 19
- Nebraska 69, Indiana 17
- Arizona 32, Iowa 3
- Illinois 28, Syracuse 14
- Colorado 55, Northwestern 7

==== October 7 ====
On October 7, 1978, the Big Ten teams played one conference game and eight non-conference games. The non-conference games resulted in three wins and five losses, giving the Big Ten a 13–15 non-conference record during the regular season.

- Wisconsin 34, Indiana 7
- Michigan 21, Arizona 17
- Notre Dame 29, Michigan State 25
- Purdue 14, Wake Forest
- Ohio State 35, SMU 35
- Oregon State 17, Minnesota 14
- Utah 13, Iowa 9
- Missouri 45, Illinois 3
- Arizona State 56, Northwestern 14

==== October 14 ====
On October 14, 1978, the Big Ten teams played five conference games.

- Michigan State 24, Michigan 15
- Purdue 27, Ohio State 16
- Minnesota 22, Iowa 20
- Illinois 20, Wisconsin 20
- Indiana 38, Northwestern 10

==== October 21 ====
On October 21, 1978, the Big Ten teams played five conference games.

- Michigan 42, Wisconsin 0
- Michigan State 49, Indiana 14
- Purdue 13, Illinois 0
- Ohio State 31, Iowa 7
- Minnesota 38, Northwestern 14

==== October 28 ====
On October 28, 1978, the Big Ten teams played five conference games.

- Michigan 42, Minnesota 10
- Michigan State 55, Wisconsin 2
- Purdue 34, Iowa 7
- Ohio State 63, Northwestern 20
- Indiana 31, Illinois 10

==== November 4 ====
On November 4, 1978, the Big Ten teams played five conference games.

- Michigan 34, Iowa 0
- Michigan State 59, Illinois 19
- Purdue 31, Northwestern 0
- Ohio State 49, Wisconsin 14
- Minnesota 32, Indiana 31

==== November 11 ====
On November 11, 1978, the Big Ten teams played five conference games.

- Michigan 59, Northwestern 14
- Michigan State 33, Minnesota 9
- Purdue 24, Wisconsin 24
- Ohio State 45, Illinois 7
- Indiana 34, Iowa 14

==== November 18 ====
On November 18, 1978, the Big Ten teams played five conference games.

- Michigan 24, Purdue 6
- Michigan State 52, Northwestern 3
- Ohio State 21, Indiana 18
- Minnesota 24, Illinois 6
- Iowa 38, Wisconsin 24

==== November 25 ====
On November 25, 1978, the Big Ten teams played five conference games.

- Michigan 14, Ohio State 3
- Michigan State 42, Iowa 7
- Purdue 20, Indiana 7
- Minnesota 48, Wisconsin 10
- Northwestern 24, Illinois 6

=== Bowl games ===
==== 1979 Rose Bowl ====
On January 1, 1979, Michigan (ranked No. 5 in the AP Poll) lost to USC (ranked No. 3), 17–10, before a crowd of 105,629 in the 1979 Rose Bowl in Pasadena, California. The game was marked by the so-called "Phantom Touchdown" scored by USC's Charles White in the second quarter. Replays showed that White fumbled the ball before crossing the goal line. One official marked the ball down at the one-yard line, but another ruled that White had scored. The officials ultimately ruled that White had scored, giving USC its margin of victory. In the final UPI coaches poll, USC jumped to No. 1 after beating Michigan.

==== 1978 Gator Bowl ====
On December 29, 1978, Ohio State (ranked No. 20 in the AP Poll) lost to Clemson (ranked No. 7), 17–15, before a crowd of 72,011 in the 1978 Gator Bowl in Jacksonville, Florida. This game was Woody Hayes' last as Ohio State's head coach. With just over two minutes left in the game, Ohio State quarterback Art Schlichter threw a pass that was intercepted by Clemson's Charlie Bauman. Bauman ran towards the OSU sideline avoiding tackles and was finally shoved out of bounds, where he was punched through his face mask by coach Hayes. The next day, Ohio State fired Hayes after 28 seasons as the school's head football coach.

==== 1978 Peach Bowl ====
On December 25, 1978, Purdue (ranked No. 17 in the UPI Poll) defeated Georgia Tech (ranked No. 19 in the UPI Poll), 41–21, before a crowd of 20,277 in the 1978 Peach Bowl held at Atlanta–Fulton County Stadium in Atlanta. Purdue quarterback Mark Herrmann completed 12 of 24 passes for 166 yards, two touchdowns and two interceptions.

== Statistical leaders ==
=== Passing yards ===
1. Ed Smith, Michigan State (2,226)
2. Mark Herrmann, Purdue (1,904)
3. Kevin Strasser, Northwestern (1,526)
4. Mike Kalasmiki, Wisconsin (1,378)
5. Rick Leach, Michigan (1,283)

=== Rushing yards ===
1. Marion Barber, Jr., Minnesota (1,210)
2. John Macon, Purdue (913)
3. Mike Harkrader, Indiana (880)
4. Steve Smith, Michigan State (772)
5. Harlan Huckleby, Michigan (741)

=== Receiving yards ===
1. Kirk Gibson, Michigan State (806)
2. Eugene Byrd, Michigan State (718)
3. David Charles, Wisconsin (573)
4. Ralph Clayton, Michigan (546)
5. Doug Donley, Ohio State (510)

=== Total offense ===
1. Ed Smith, Michigan State (2,247)
2. Rick Leach, Michigan (1,894)
3. Art Schlichter, Ohio State (1,840)
4. Mark Herrmann, Purdue (1,824)
5. Mike Kalasmiki, Wisconsin (1,547)

=== Passing efficiency rating ===
1. Ed Smith, Michigan State (139.0)
2. Mark Herrmann, Purdue (121.9)
3. Mike Kalasmiki, Wisconsin (101.5)
4. Art Schlichter, Ohio State (93.3)
5. Kevin Strasser, Northwestern (88.9)

=== Rushing yards per attempt ===
1. Steve Smith, Michigan State (6.7)
2. Leroy McGee, Michigan State (6.0)
3. Tom Stauss, Wisconsin (5.9)
4. Ricardo Volley, Ohio State (5.5)
5. Wayne Strader, Illinois (5.3)

=== Yards per reception ===
1. Ralph Clayton, Michigan (21.8)
2. Doug Donley, Ohio State (21.2)
3. Kirk Gibson, Michigan State (19.2)
4. Elmer Bailey, Minnesota (17.2)
5. Eugene Byrd, Michigan State (16.7)

=== Points scored ===
1. Art Schlichter, Ohio State (78)
2. Morten Andersen, Michigan State (73)
2. Scott Sovereen, Purdue (73)
4. Rick Leach, Michigan (72)
5. Gregg Willner, Michigan (68)

== Awards and honors ==
=== All-Big Ten honors ===
The following players were picked by the Associated Press (AP) and/or the United Press International (UPI) as first-team players on the 1978 All-Big Ten Conference football team.

Offense

Position	Name	Team	Selectors
Quarterback	Rick Leach	Michigan	AP, UPI
Running back	Marion Barber, Jr.	Minnesota	AP, UPI [tailback]
Running back	Russell Davis	Michigan	AP, UPI [fullback]
Receiver	Kirk Gibson	Michigan State	AP [flanker], UPI [wingback]
Receiver	Eugene Byrd	Michigan State	AP [wide receiver], UPI [split end]
Tight end	Mark Brammer	Michigan State	AP, UPI
Center	Mark Heidel	Indiana	AP, UPI
Guard	Ken Fritz	Ohio State	AP, UPI
Guard	John Arbeznik	Michigan	UPI
Tackle	Jon Giesler	Michigan	AP [guard], UPI
Tackle	Jim Hinsley	Michigan State	AP, UPI
Tackle	Joe Robinson	Ohio State	AP

Defense

Position	Name	Team	Selectors
Defensive line	Curtis Greer	Michigan	AP, UPI
Defensive line	Melvin Land	Michigan State	AP, UPI
Defensive line	Ken Loushin	Purdue	AP, UPI
Defensive line	Keena Turner	Purdue	AP, UPI
Defensive line	Kelton Dansler	Ohio State	AP
Defensive line	Stan Sytsma	Minnesota	UPI
Linebacker	Tom Cousineau	Ohio State	AP, UPI
Linebacker	Joe Norman	Indiana	AP, UPI
Linebacker	Ron Simpkins	Michigan	AP
Defensive back	Mike Jolly	Michigan	AP, UPI
Defensive back	Tom Graves	Michigan State	AP
Defensive back	Vince Skillings	Ohio State	AP
Defensive back	Keith Brown	Minnesota	UPI
Defensive back	Mike Guess	Ohio State	UPI
Defensive back	Mike Harden	Michigan	UPI

=== All-American honors ===
At the end of the 1978 season, only one Big Ten player was a consensus first-team pick for the 1978 College Football All-America Team. The Big Ten's consensus All-Americans were:

Position	Name	Team	Selectors
Linebacker	Tom Cousineau	Ohio State	AP, UPI, NEA, WCFF, AFCA, TSN

Other Big Ten players who were named first-team All-Americans by at least one selector were:

Position	Name	Team	Selectors
Receiver	Kirk Gibson	Michigan State	UPI, NEA, TSN
Defensive back	Lawrence Johnson	Wisconsin	NEA, TSN
Tight end	Mark Brammer	Michigan State	FWAA
Quarterback	Rick Leach	Michigan	AFCA [tie]

=== Other awards ===
- Heisman Trophy voting: Michigan quarterback Rick Leach (third)
- Big Ten Coach of the Year: Jim Young of Purdue.

== 1979 NFL draft ==
The 1979 NFL draft was held in New York on May 3–4, 1979. The following players were among the first 100 picks:

Name	Position	Team	Round	Overall pick
Tom Cousineau	Linebacker	Ohio State	1	1
Jon Giesler	Offensive tackle	Michigan	1	24
Lawrence Johnson	Defensive back	Wisconsin	2	40
Joe Norman	Linebacker	Indiana	2	45
Mel Land	Linebacker	Michigan State	3	63
Russell Davis	Running back	Michigan	4	86
Derwin Tucker	Defensive Back	Illinois	4	99
