= Danny Smith (American football) =

American football coach (born 1953)

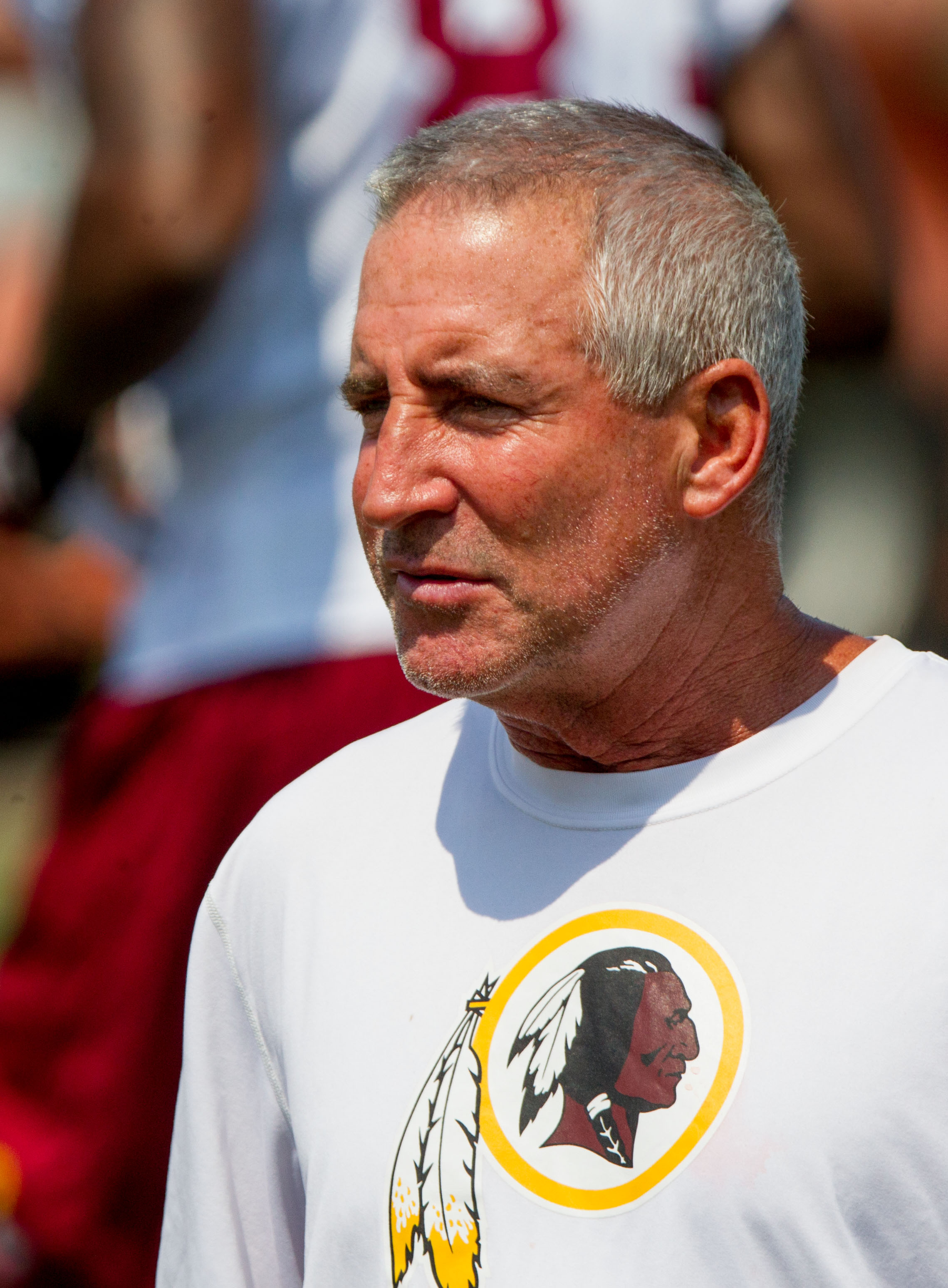
- Smith with the Washington Redskins in 2012

Tampa Bay Buccaneers
- Title: Special teams coordinator

Personal information
- Born: November 7, 1953 (age 72); Pittsburgh, Pennsylvania, U.S.

Career information
- Positions: Defensive back, quarterback
- College: Edinboro State

Career history
- Edinboro (1976) Graduate assistant; Central Catholic HS (PA) (1977–1978) Defensive backs coach; Clemson (1979) Graduate assistant; William & Mary (1980–1983) Graduate assistant; The Citadel (1984–1986) Assistant; Georgia Tech (1987–1994) Running backs coach, wide receivers coach, & defensive backs coach; Philadelphia Eagles (1995–1998) Special teams coordinator & defensive backs coach; Detroit Lions (1999–2000) Tight ends coach; Buffalo Bills (2001–2003) Special teams coordinator; Washington Redskins (2004–2012) Special teams coordinator; Pittsburgh Steelers (2013–2025) Special teams coordinator; Tampa Bay Buccaneers (2026–present) Special teams coordinator

Daniel Thomas Smith (born November 7, 1953) is an American professional football coach who is the special teams coordinator for the Tampa Bay Buccaneers of the National Football League (NFL).

== Early life and college ==
Smith was born and raised in Pittsburgh, Pennsylvania. He graduated from Central Catholic High School in 1974. During his time there he participated in football, basketball and baseball.

He played as a defensive back and quarterback during his time with the Edinboro Fighting Scots, a team competing in NCAA Division II. In 2007, Smith was inducted into the Edinboro Athletics Hall of Fame.

== Coaching career ==
Smith began his coaching career at his alma mater, Edinboro College (now PennWest Edinboro), as a graduate assistant. Following his season at Edinboro, he began coaching at his high school alma mater, Pittsburgh Central Catholic (1977–78), helping tutor future Pro Football Hall of Fame quarterback Dan Marino. After two decades of coaching at the collegiate and high school levels, Smith entered the NFL in 1995 as the Philadelphia Eagles' coach for special teams and defensive backs. Subsequently, he occupied various assistant coaching roles with the Detroit, Buffalo, and Washington teams.

=== Pittsburgh Steelers ===
Smith joined the Steelers' coaching staff ahead of the 2013 season where he remained as the special teams coordinator until the 2025 season. The Steelers' special teams unit began to become an integral unit to the team under Smith. Most notably, Smith led the special teams unit to a win in the 2016 AFC Divisional round when kicker Chris Boswell scored on all six field goal attempts to defeat the Kansas City Chiefs 18–16.

Smith is credited with developing Boswell as a player. As of the 2024 season, Boswell is the sixth most accurate kicker in NFL history, making 87.6% of his field goal attempts. During the 2019 season, Smith emphasized the importance of attention to detail and trust within his unit. Boswell, coming off a challenging 2018 season, showed significant improvement, which Smith attributed to a renewed focus on "detailing his work" and maintaining a "positive mindset". During a game against the Los Angeles Chargers that same season, Cam Sutton made a successful onside kick recovery. Smith placed Sutton in that high-pressure situation due to his trust in his unit to be dominant. Additionally, while Jordan Berry’s punting average was on pace to set a franchise record, Smith remained focused on game-to-game performance and stressed that consistent improvement was the ultimate goal and did not focus on the record itself.

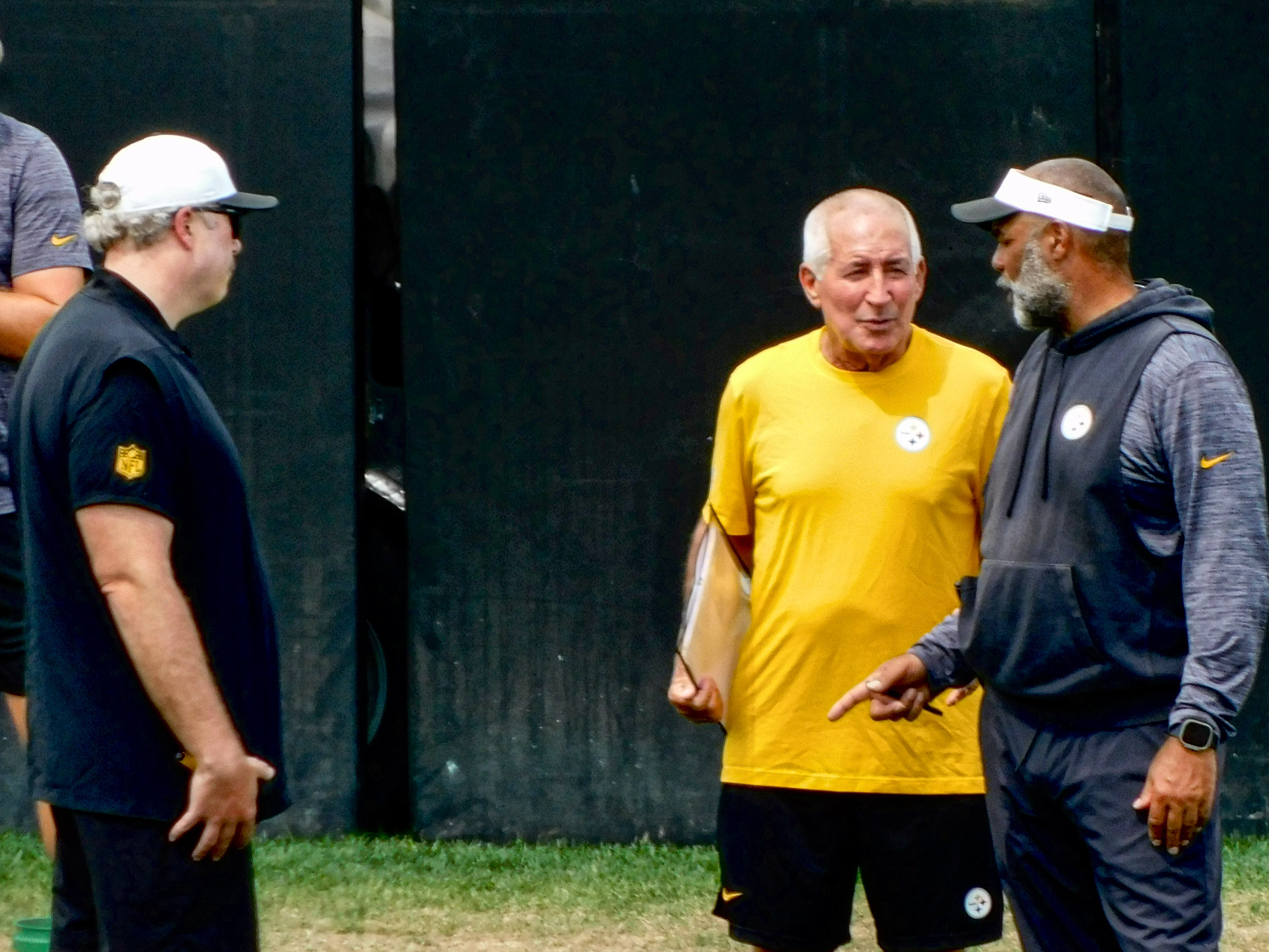
Smith with offensive and defensive coordinators Arthur Smith and Teryl Austin in 2025

On November 16, 2023, Smith tore his rotator cuff in three places absorbing a collision with Domontae Kazee on the sideline following the final play of a victory over the Green Bay Packers.

The 2023 season saw a strong outing for the Steelers' special teams unit in which they achieved a field goal percentage of 93.6 and an extra points made percentage of 96.4. This accounted for 114 of the 304 (38%) total points scored by the team during the season.

Smith began to see wider praise among the league when the Steelers special teams unit began making dominant plays. In Week 1 of the 2024 season, kicker Chris Boswell successfully made six field goals to win 18–10 over the Atlanta Falcons. Smith would lead the Steelers in replicating this feat with Boswell making six more field goals in an 18–16 victory over the Baltimore Ravens. In four games, the Steelers' special teams unit recorded two blocked field goals, a blocked punt, a blocked extra point, a punt return for a touchdown, and 12 field goals under Smith. Under Smith's leadership, the team began to develop confidence in the unit with Smith making aggressive play calls. During a matchup against the Commanders, Smith's former team, the Steelers attempted to execute a risky fake-punt deep inside Steelers territory. The play was not successful with Miles Killebrew missing James Pierre on the pass, which led to a short touchdown drive for the Commanders. The Steelers ended the game by defeating Washington 28–27.

In Pittsburgh, Smith was the subject of overwhelming praise for his coaching of the team's dominant special teams unit. He is often the subject of internet memes due to his eccentric personality and is often noted for his habit of excessively chewing large amounts of gum on the sidelines of games, particularly during high-stakes situations.

=== Tampa Bay Buccaneers ===
On January 20, 2026, the Tampa Bay Buccaneers hired Smith as their new special teams coordinator.

== Personal life ==
Danny is the older brother of Ed Smith, a quarterback who set the Big Ten Conference record for career passing yardage while playing for Michigan State and later played in the Canadian Football League (CFL). He’s the younger brother of George Smith, the proprietor of Dunning's in Regent Square in Pittsburgh, which closed in July 2015, and coach of St. Bede and Morningside football for over four decades.

Smith currently resides with his family in Wexford, Pennsylvania.
