= Joe Haeg =

American football player (born 1993)

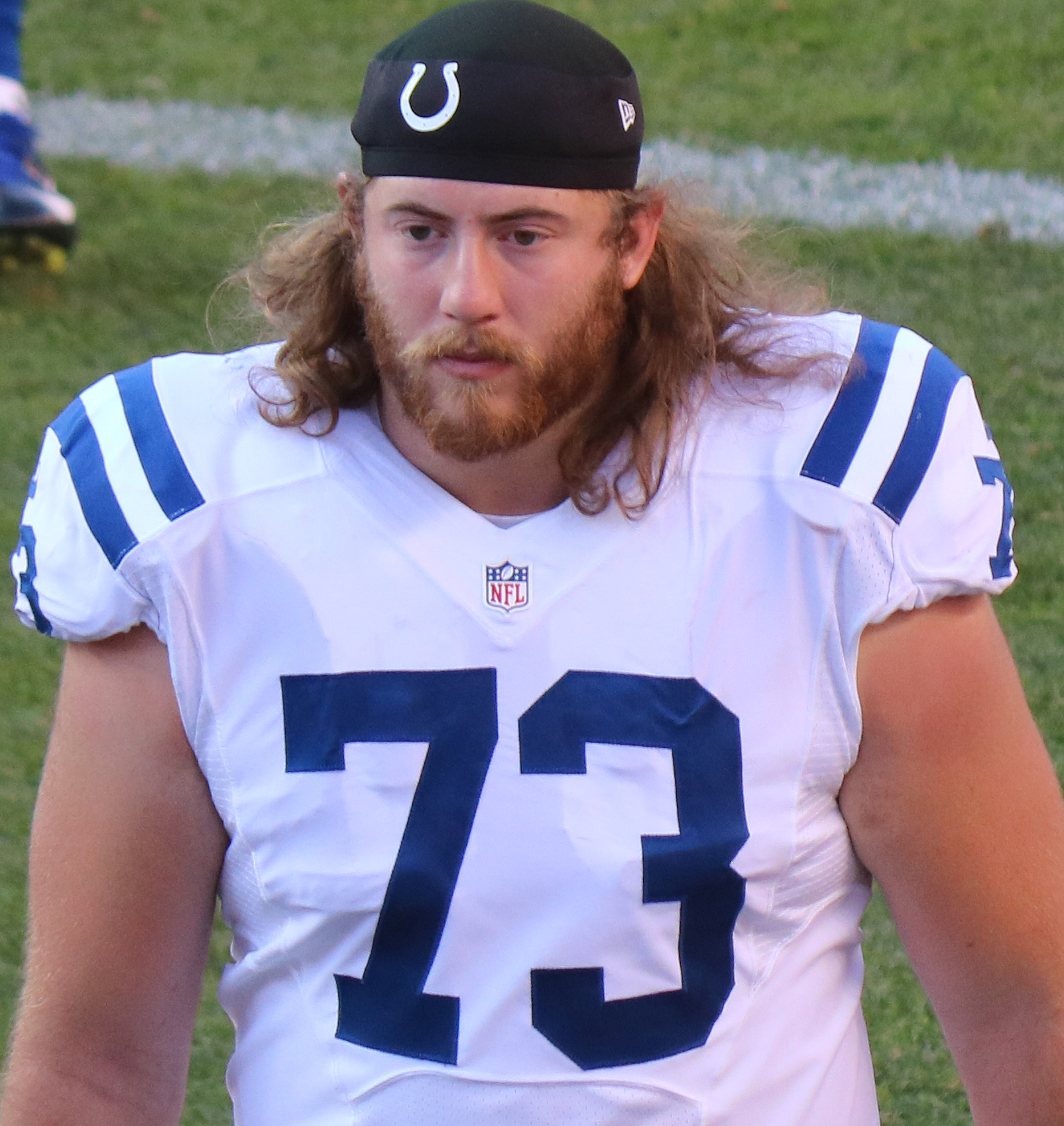
- Haeg with the Indianapolis Colts in 2016

No. 73, 71, 59
- Position: Offensive tackle

Personal information
- Born: March 11, 1993 (age 33); Brainerd, Minnesota, U.S.
- Listed height: 6 ft 6 in (1.98 m)
- Listed weight: 304 lb (138 kg)

Career information
- High school: Brainerd
- College: North Dakota State (2011–2015)
- NFL draft: 2016: 5th round, 155th overall pick

Career history
- Indianapolis Colts (2016–2019); Tampa Bay Buccaneers (2020); Pittsburgh Steelers (2021); Cleveland Browns (2022)

Awards and highlights
- Super Bowl champion (LV); 5× FCS national champion (2011–2015)

Career NFL statistics
- Games played: 80
- Games started: 40
- Stats at Pro Football Reference

Joe Haeg (born March 11, 1993) is an American former professional football player who was an offensive tackle in the National Football League (NFL). He played college football at North Dakota State and was drafted by the Indianapolis Colts in the fifth round (155th overall) of the 2016 NFL draft. He also played for the Tampa Bay Buccaneers, Pittsburgh Steelers, and Cleveland Browns, and won Super Bowl LV with Tampa Bay.

== Professional career ==
Pre-draft measurables
Height	Weight	Arm length	Hand span	40-yard dash	10-yard split	20-yard split	20-yard shuttle	Three-cone drill	Vertical jump	Broad jump
6 ft 6 in (1.98 m)	304 lb (138 kg)	33 3/4 in (0.86 m)	9 5/8 in (0.24 m)	5.16 s	1.75 s	2.98 s	4.47 s	7.47 s	30.0 in (0.76 m)	9 ft 3 in (2.82 m)
Shuttle, cone drill and broad are NFL Combine top performer All values from NFL Combine/Pro Day

=== Indianapolis Colts ===
Haeg was drafted in the fifth round with the 155th overall pick in the 2016 NFL draft by the Indianapolis Colts. He signed his rookie contract with the Colts on May 5, 2016. He played in 15 games with 14 starts as a rookie for the Colts. In 2017, he played in all 16 games, starting 15 at right tackle and right guard.

In 2018, Haeg started two games at right tackle and one at left tackle before suffering an ankle injury in Week 3. He was placed on injured reserve on September 28, 2018. He was activated off injured reserve on December 1, 2018. He started two games at right guard upon his return in place of an injured Mark Glowinski.

=== Tampa Bay Buccaneers ===
On March 21, 2020, Haeg signed a one-year deal with the Tampa Bay Buccaneers. Haeg appeared in 12 games and started three in the 2020 season. Haeg played in Super Bowl LV, a 31–9 victory over the Kansas City Chiefs. He was targeted on a trick play that almost resulted in a touchdown reception but ended up as an incomplete pass.

=== Pittsburgh Steelers ===
Haeg signed a two-year contract with the Pittsburgh Steelers on March 24, 2021. He was released on August 30, 2022.

=== Cleveland Browns ===
On September 4, 2022, Haeg signed with the Cleveland Browns. He was placed on injured reserve on October 29 with a concussion. Haeg was released by the Browns on June 5, 2023. He retired following the 2023 season.

=== NFL career statistics ===
Legend
Won the Super Bowl

Year	Team	Games	Starts
2016	IND	15	14
2017	IND	16	15
2018	IND	8	6
2019	IND	16	0
2020	TB	12	3
2021	PIT	5	1
Career		72	39
