= Ed Smith (quarterback) =

American gridiron football player (born 1956)

Profile
- Position: Quarterback

Personal information
- Born: January 13, 1956 (age 70)
- Listed height: 6 ft 1 in (1.85 m)
- Listed weight: 168 lb (76 kg)

Career information
- College: Michigan State (1976–1978)

Career history
- Hamilton Tiger-Cats (1979)

Ed Smith (born January 13, 1956) is an American former football quarterback.

== Early life ==
Smith grew up in Pittsburgh, Pennsylvania, and attended Central Catholic High School.

Smith's elder brother, Danny Smith, has been a football coach for more than 30 years, including stints with Georgia Tech (1987–1994), the Washington Redskins (2004–2012), and the Pittsburgh Steelers (2013 to present).

== Michigan State ==
Smith played college football at Michigan State University as a quarterback from 1976 to 1978. He was redshirted in 1975. As a senior, he led the Big Ten with 2,226 passing yards, a 139.0 passing efficiency rating, and 2,247 yards of total offense. He was also selected as the most valuable player on the 1978 Michigan State Spartans football team that as the co-champion of the Big Ten. He was also selected by both the Associated Press and United Press International as the second-team quarterback (behind Rick Leach) on the 1978 All-Big Ten Conference football team. He finished his career as Michigan State's and the Big Ten's all-time leader with 5,706 passing yards.

In June 2015, the Lansing State Journal ranked Smith at No. 46 on it list of Michigan State's greatest football players.

== Hamilton Tiger-Cats ==
In February 1979, Smith signed a two-year contract to play professional football for the Hamilton Tiger-Cats of the Canadian Football League. In one of his early games for Hamilton, he threw five interceptions. He appeared in a total of 16 games for the Tiger-Cats in 1979, completing 61 of 140 passes for 794 yards, four touchdowns, and 14 interceptions. In May 1980, Smith announced his retirement from professional football.
