= James Pierre =

American football player (born 1996)

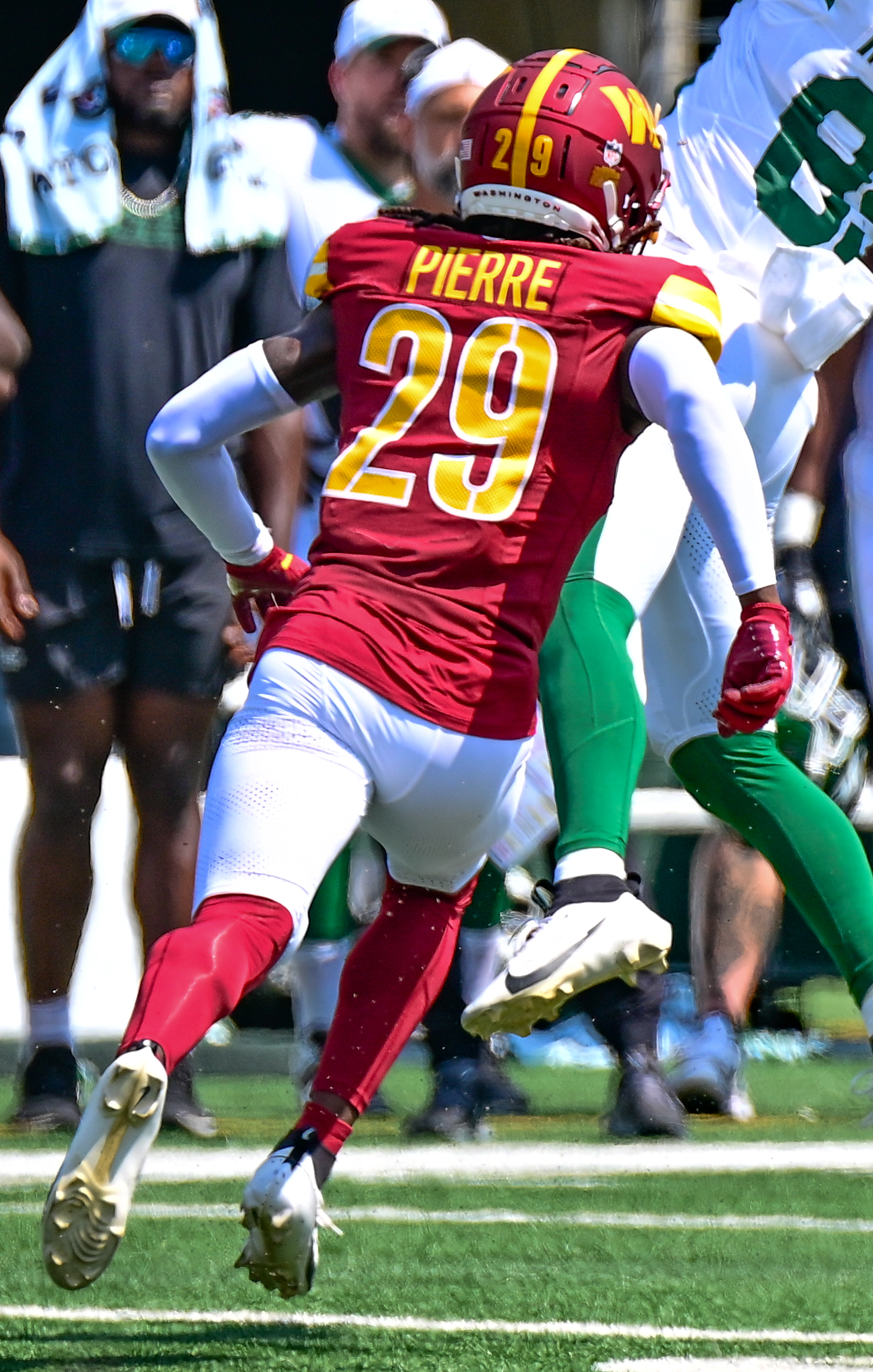
- Pierre with the Washington Commanders in 2024

No. 23 – Minnesota Vikings
- Position: Cornerback
- Roster status: Active

Personal information
- Born: September 16, 1996 (age 30); Deerfield Beach, Florida, U.S.
- Listed height: 6 ft 2 in (1.88 m)
- Listed weight: 185 lb (84 kg)

Career information
- High school: Deerfield Beach
- College: Florida Atlantic (2017–2019)
- NFL draft: 2020: undrafted

Career history
- Pittsburgh Steelers (2020–2023); Washington Commanders (2024)*; Pittsburgh Steelers (2024–2025); Minnesota Vikings (2026–present)
- * Offseason or practice squad member only

Career NFL statistics as of Week 10, 2026
- Tackles: 176
- Interceptions: 6
- Pass deflections: 27
- Forced fumbles: 5
- Fumble recoveries: 2
- Defensive touchdowns: 1
- Stats at Pro Football Reference

James Pierre Jr. (born September 16, 1996) is an American professional football cornerback for the Minnesota Vikings of the National Football League (NFL). He played college football for the Florida Atlantic Owls and signed with the Pittsburgh Steelers as an undrafted free agent in 2020. Pierre has also been a member of the Washington Commanders.

== Early life ==
Pierre was born and raised in Deerfield Beach, Florida, as the second oldest of 6 siblings to Natalie McNeil. Pierre attended Deerfield Beach High School. As a senior, he registered 48 tackles, four interceptions and two pass break-ups, helping Deerfield Beach to a 10–2 record. The Miami Herald named him one of the Top 25 seniors in Broward County, while the Sun-Sentinel named him all-county honorable mention. Pierre was considered a three-star prospect and the No. 48 safety in the Class of 2016 by 247Sports.com's composite rankings. He initially committed to Miami (FL) over offers from Louisville, Mississippi State, Tennessee, South Carolina and Wisconsin, but switched his commitment to North Carolina in February 2016. Pierre was denied admission and committed to Syracuse.

== College career ==
Pierre was ruled academically ineligible by the NCAA for his freshman season. He transferred to Florida Atlantic and had 21 tackles and two pass deflections as a freshman in 2017. Pierre posted 55 tackles and nine pass breakups as a sophomore. On November 2, 2019, he made two interceptions in a 35–24 win over Western Kentucky. As a junior in 2019, Pierre recorded 44 tackles, 4.5 tackles for losses and three interceptions. He finished his collegiate career with 120 total tackles, 18 pass breakups, 8 1/2 tackles for losses and three interceptions in 39 games. Pierre declared for the 2020 NFL draft following the season.

== Professional career ==
Pre-draft measurables
Height	Weight	Arm length	Hand span	Wingspan	40-yard dash	10-yard split	20-yard split	Three-cone drill	Vertical jump	Broad jump
6 ft 0 in (1.83 m)	183 lb (83 kg)	31 1/4 in (0.79 m)	8 1/2 in (0.22 m)	6 ft 4 in (1.93 m)	4.59 s	1.56 s	2.68 s	7.02 s	33.5 in (0.85 m)	10 ft 3 in (3.12 m)
All values from NFL Combine

=== Pittsburgh Steelers (first stint) ===
After going unselected in the 2020 NFL draft, Pierre signed an undrafted free agent deal with the Pittsburgh Steelers. He was named to the Steelers' initial 53-man roster as the only undrafted free agent to make the team in that fashion in 2020. In Week 2 of the 2021 season against the Las Vegas Raiders, Pierre made his first career NFL start due to a groin injury to Joe Haden. In Week 5 against the Denver Broncos, he made his first NFL interception.

On March 21, 2023, Pierre re–signed with the Steelers.

=== Washington Commanders ===
On March 21, 2024, Pierre signed with the Washington Commanders. On August 27, he was released by the Commanders as part of final roster cuts.

=== Pittsburgh Steelers (second stint) ===
On September 17, 2024, Pierre signed with the Pittsburgh Steelers' practice squad. In Week 3, he played against the Los Angeles Chargers, and then signed to the active roster on September 24.

On March 20, 2025, Pierre was re-signed by the Steelers on a one-year contract. He was released by the Steelers on August 26 as part of final roster cuts, and re-signed to the practice squad the following day. Pierre was promoted to the active roster on September 10.

In Week 11 against the Cincinnati Bengals, Pierre recorded 6 tackles and a 34 yard fumble recovery for a touchdown in the 4th quarter in a 34-12 win.

=== Minnesota Vikings ===
On March 12, 2026, Pierre signed a two-year, $8.5 million contract with the Minnesota Vikings.

On week 8 against Detroit, Pierre intercepted Jared Goff's first pass of the season.

== Personal life ==
Pierre's cousin is two-time NFL MVP Lamar Jackson. Pierre is of partial Haitian descent, as his father James came from the nation before eventually being deported.
