= 1975 Liberty Bowl =

American college football game

- 17th Liberty Bowl
USC Trojans	Texas A&M Aggies
(7–4)	(10–1)
Pac-8	SWC
20	0
Head coach: John McKay	Head coach: Emory Bellard
	AP / Coaches; 2 / 6
	1	2	3	4	Total
USC	3	17	0	0	20
Texas A&M	0	0	0	0	0
- Date: December 22, 1975
- Season: 1975
- Stadium: Liberty Bowl Memorial Stadium
- Location: Memphis, Tennessee
- MVP: RB Ricky Bell (USC)
- Attendance: 52,129

The 1975 Liberty Bowl was a college football postseason bowl game played on December 22, 1975, in Memphis, Tennessee. In the 17th edition of the Liberty Bowl, the USC Trojans defeated the Texas A&M Aggies, 20–0. This was the first playing of the bowl with the venue named as Liberty Bowl Memorial Stadium, as its name had been changed from Memphis Memorial Stadium earlier the same month.

== Background ==
The Aggies had won more games than in the previous season for the third straight year, and it culminated in a conference title, albeit a shared one. The Aggies started the season ranked at #8, opening the season up with a victory over Ole Miss. The Aggies won their first ten games, with the last being against #5 Texas 20–10. However, quarterback Mike Jay injured his back during the victory, and David Shipman replaced him for the game against #18 Arkansas in early December. The Aggies lost 31–6 to fall to #6 and finish with a share of the Southwest Conference title with Arkansas and Texas, with the former going to the Cotton Bowl that year. Instead, the Aggies were invited to the Liberty Bowl, their first ever appearance in the game along with their first bowl appearance since 1968.

The Trojans started their season off ranked fourth in the nation, as they won their first seven games of the season to be at #4 heading into the latter part of their conference schedule. But losses to California, Stanford, Washington, and #14 UCLA dropped them out of the polls and out of the race for the Pacific-8 Conference title, as they finished at 3-4, behind the teams that had beaten USC. This was their fourth straight bowl game along with their first Liberty Bowl appearance. This was the first season that the Pac-8 allowed bowl participation in addition to the Rose Bowl; Cal, Stanford, and Washington stayed at home while fifth place USC was invited to Memphis.

== Game summary ==
A Monday night game, temperatures were around 35 °F (2 °C) and all of the scoring was in the first half. Glen Walker started the scoring off with a field goal from 45 yards. Quarterback Vince Evans' 65-yard pass set up a Mosi Tatupu touchdown plunge from a yard out to make it 10–0 in the second quarter. Clint Strozier intercepted a pass at the Aggie 19 to set up a Walker field goal from 40 yards out. A screen pass from Evans to Ricky Bell went 76 yards for a touchdown to give the Trojans a 20–0 lead with 5:14 in the half.

There were no scoring drives in the second half as the Trojans completed the shutout. Texas A&M was completely stymied on the day, turning the ball over four times, including two times when in Trojan territory. Despite having more first downs and rushing yards (15 and 148 yards to USC's 13 and 141, respectively), USC outpassed them 174 to 99 while Bell rushed for 82 yards on 28 carries. With the yards carried in the game, he broke the USC's single season rushing record of 1,880 yards set by O. J. Simpson in 1968 with 1,957 yards in 12 games.

== Aftermath ==
This was head coach John McKay's final game with the Trojans, as he left for the expansion Tampa Bay Buccaneers in the National Football League (NFL). USC continued their run with new coach John Robinson, going to three more bowl games in the decade. They have not been invited to the Liberty Bowl since this game. Texas A&M also went to three more bowl games in the decade, though they did not return to the Liberty Bowl again until 2014. The two teams met again two years later in the Astro-Bluebonnet Bowl, which USC won 47–28.
