= 1975 UCLA Bruins football team =

American college football season

1975 UCLA Bruins football

Pac-8 co-champion Rose Bowl champion

Rose Bowl, W 23–10 vs. Ohio State
- Conference: Pacific-8 Conference

Ranking
- Coaches: No. 5
- AP: No. 5
- Record: 9–2–1 (6–1 Pac-8)
- Head coach: Dick Vermeil (2nd season)
- Offensive coordinator: Rod Dowhower (2nd season)
- Defensive coordinator: Lynn Stiles (2nd season)
- Home stadium: Los Angeles Memorial Coliseum

1975 Pacific-8 Conference football standings
	Conf.					Overall
Team	W		L		T	W		L		T
No. 5 UCLA ^ +	6	–	1	–	0	9	–	2	–	1
No. 14 California +	6	–	1	–	0	8	–	3	–	0
Stanford	5	–	2	–	0	6	–	4	–	1
Washington	5	–	2	–	0	6	–	5	–	0
No. 17 USC	3	–	4	–	0	8	–	4	–	0
Oregon	2	–	5	–	0	3	–	8	–	0
Oregon State	1	–	6	–	0	1	–	10	–	0
Washington State	0	–	7	–	0	3	–	8	–	0
+ – Conference co-champions; ^ – Selected as Rose Bowl representative; Rankings from AP Poll

The 1975 UCLA Bruins football team represented the University of California, Los Angeles in the 1975 NCAA Division I football season. Led by second-year head coach Dick Vermeil, the Bruins won their first Pacific-8 championship in a decade and were 8–2–1 in the regular season. On New Year's Day, UCLA upset previously undefeated and top-ranked Ohio State in the Rose Bowl and climbed to fifth in the final rankings.

Coming off an injury-plagued 1974 season at 6–3–2, UCLA began the season ranked No. 16. A season-opening 37–21 win over Iowa State in the Los Angeles Memorial Coliseum saw them move up to twelfth; this was followed by a 34–28 win over No. 10 Tennessee. But they stumbled in a turnover-plagued 20–20 tie at Air Force; second-ranked Ohio State traveled west and handed UCLA its first loss of the season, 41–20 on October 4. After the game, head coach Woody Hayes prophetically told his team that they would be facing UCLA again in the Rose Bowl. UCLA was the only opponent to score more than 14 points in a game all season against Ohio State, and they did it twice.

The Ohio State loss dropped the Bruins out of the top 20, but they returned to No. 13 after wins over Stanford, Washington State, and a key win over California. But another loss, this time to Washington 17–13, dropped them back out of the top 20 and resulted in a five-way tie at the top of the Pac-8 between UCLA, California, Stanford, USC, and Washington.

After a pair of wins over the Oregon schools, the Bruins went into their season-ending game against rival USC needing a win to go to the Rose Bowl; a loss or tie would send California to Pasadena. Despite fumbling 11 times and losing 8, UCLA beat the Trojans 25–22. UCLA ended up tied with California for the Pac-8 championship, but advanced to the Rose Bowl on the strength of their 28–14 win over the Golden Bears. The Bruins went into the Rose Bowl ranked No. 11. The 1975 USC–UCLA game was coach John McKay and Vermeil's final game at the Coliseum.

It was the only bowl appearance for Vermeil in his two seasons at UCLA; a month later he left for the Philadelphia Eagles of the National Football League.

== Schedule ==
Date	Time	Opponent	Rank	Site	TV	Result	Attendance	Source
September 13	8:05 pm	Iowa State*	No. 16	Los Angeles Memorial Coliseum; Los Angeles, CA		W 37–21	31,260	
September 20	12:50 pm	No. 10 Tennessee*	No. 12	Los Angeles Memorial Coliseum; Los Angeles, CA	ABC	W 34–28	33,356	
September 27	2:30 pm	at Air Force*	No. 10	Falcon Stadium; Colorado Springs, CO		T 20–20	33,390	
October 4	6:00 pm	No. 2 Ohio State*	No. 13	Los Angeles Memorial Coliseum; Los Angeles, CA	ABC	L 20–41	55,482	
October 11	1:30 pm	at Stanford		Stanford Stadium; Stanford, CA		W 31–21	52,500	
October 18	1:30 pm	at Washington State	No. 18	Joe Albi Stadium; Spokane, WA		W 37–23	28,500	
October 25	3:00 pm	California	No. 19	Los Angeles Memorial Coliseum; Los Angeles, CA		W 28–14	36,100	
November 1	1:30 pm	Washington	No. 13	Los Angeles Memorial Coliseum; Los Angeles, CA		L 13–17	29,158	
November 8	1:30 pm	at Oregon		Autzen Stadium; Eugene, OR		W 50–17	15,500	
November 15	1:30 pm	Oregon State	No. 19	Los Angeles Memorial Coliseum; Los Angeles, CA		W 31–9	30,203	
November 28	5:00 pm	vs. USC	No. 14	Los Angeles Memorial Coliseum; Los Angeles, CA (Victory Bell)	ABC	W 25–22	80,927	
January 1, 1976	2:00 pm	vs. No. 1 Ohio State*	No. 11	Rose Bowl; Pasadena, CA (Rose Bowl)	NBC	W 23–10	105,464	
*Non-conference game; Rankings from AP Poll released prior to the game; All times are in Pacific time

== Game summaries ==
=== Ohio State ===
	1	2	3	4	Total
UCLA	7	0	7	6	20
Ohio State	7	21	10	3	41

1st quarter scoring: UCLA – James Sarpy 13-yard pass from John Sciarra (Brett White kick); OSU – Greene 2-yard run (Klaban kick)

2nd quarter scoring: OSU – Johnson 3-yard run (Klaban kick); OSU – Johnson 2-yard run (Klaban kick); OSU – Greene 17-yard run (Klaban kick)

3rd quarter scoring: OSU – A. Griffin 17-yard run (Klaban kick); OSU – Klaban 34-yard field goal; UCLA – Eddie Ayers 2-yard run (White kick)

4th quarter scoring: UCLA – Ayers 1-yard run (kick failed); OSU – Klaban 42-yard field goal

=== Ohio State (Rose Bowl) ===
	1	2	3	4	Total
UCLA	0	0	16	7	23
Ohio State	3	0	0	7	10

1st quarter scoring: Ohio State – Tom Klaban 42-yard field goal

2nd quarter scoring: No score

3rd quarter scoring: UCLA – Brett White 33-yard field goal; UCLA – Wally Henry 16-yard pass from John Sciarra (White kick failed); UCLA – Henry 67-yard pass from Sciarra (White kick)

4th quarter scoring: Ohio State – Pete Johnson 3-yard run (Klaban kick); UCLA – Wendell Tyler 54-yard run (White kick)

== Personnel ==
=== Roster ===
1975 UCLA Bruins football team roster
Players
Coaches
Offense

Pos.	#	Name	Class
OT	73	Phil McKinnely	Sr
WR		Severn Reece	So
QB	15	John Sciarra	Sr

Defense

Pos.	#	Name	Class
LB	56	Terry Tautolo	Sr
LB	40	Manu Tuiasosopo	Fr

Special teams

Pos.	#	Name	Class

Head coach

- Dick Vermeil

Coordinators/assistant coaches

Legend

- (C) Team captain
- (S) Suspended
- (I) Ineligible
- Injured
- Redshirt

34 returning lettermen from Coach Dick Vermeil's first team that was 6–3–2 in 1974.

=== Offense ===
- 89 Norm Andersen, SE
- 70 Gus Coppens LT
- 73 Phil McKinnely, LG
- 62 Mitch Kahn, C
- 51 Randy Cross, RG
- 75 Jack DeMartinis, RT
- 7 Rick Walker, TE
- 15 John Sciarra QB
- 22 Wendell Tyler, LHB
- 30 Eddie Ayers, RHB
- 8 Wally Henry, FL

=== Defense ===
- 42 Jeff Smith, S
- 68 Tim Tennigkeit, LT
- 56 Terry Tautolo, ILB
- 59 Pete Pele, NG
- Kelly Stroich, ILB
- 90 Bob Crawford, RT
- 83 Dale Curry, OLB
- 87 Raymond Burks, OLB
- 29 Barney Person, LCB
- 21 Oscar Edwards, RCB
- Matt Fahl, S
- 88 Pat Schmidt, S
- 82 John Terando DB

=== Specialists ===
- 34 Brett White, PK
- 6 John Sullivan, P

=== Coaches ===
- Dick Vermeil, head coach
- Lynn Stiles, assistant head coach/defensive coordinator
- Jim Criner, linebackers/tight ends
- Terry Donahue, offensive line
- Rod Dowhower, offensive coordinator/quarterbacks/wide receivers
- Jerry Long, offensive line/defensive line
- Billie Matthews, running backs
- Bill McPherson, defensive line
- Carl Peterson, wide receivers/tight ends
- Dick Tomey, defensive backs
- Mike Flores, graduate assistant

== Awards and honors ==
- John Sciarra, QB, All-Conference, NCAA Post-Graduate Scholarship, ESPN The Magazine/CoSIDA Academic All America, National Football Foundation and Hall of Fame Scholarship, NCAA Top Eight Award, inducted into the College Football Hall of Fame (2014)
- Randy Cross, G, All-Conference, inducted into the College Football Hall of Fame (2010)
- Fulton Kuykendall, LB, All-Conference
- Head coach Dick Vermeil will be inducted into the Rose Bowl Hall of Fame as a member of the Class of 2014.
- Barney Person, CB, Lead nation & UCLA in interceptions, made key Rose Bowl interception

== 1975 team players in the NFL ==
The following players were claimed in the 1975 NFL draft.

Player	Position	Round	Pick	NFL club
Fulton Kuykendall	Linebacker	6	132	Atlanta Falcons
Eugene Clark	Offensive guard	9	222	Pittsburgh Steelers
Art Kuehn	Center	15	384	Washington Redskins
Myke Horton	Offensive tackle	17	428	New England Patriots

The following players were claimed in the 1976 NFL draft.

Player	Position	Round	Pick	NFL club
Cliff Frazier	Defensive tackle	2	41	Kansas City Chiefs
Randy Cross	Center	2	42	San Francisco 49ers
John Sciarra	Defensive back	4	103	Chicago Bears
Phil McKinnely	Tackle	9	246	Atlanta Falcons
Norman Andersen	Wide receiver	11	299	Chicago Bears
Terry Tautolo	Linebacker	13	353	Philadelphia Eagles
Brett White	Punter	15	412	Philadelphia Eagles
Dale Curry	Linebacker	15	430	Dallas Cowboys

The following player was claimed in the 1977 NFL draft.

Player	Position	Round	Pick	NFL club
Wendell Tyler	Running back	3	79	Los Angeles Rams
Rick Walker	Tight end	4	85	Cincinnati Bengals
Ray Burks	Linebacker	12	318	Kansas City Chiefs
