= 1975 Washington State Cougars football team =

American college football season

1975 Washington State Cougars football
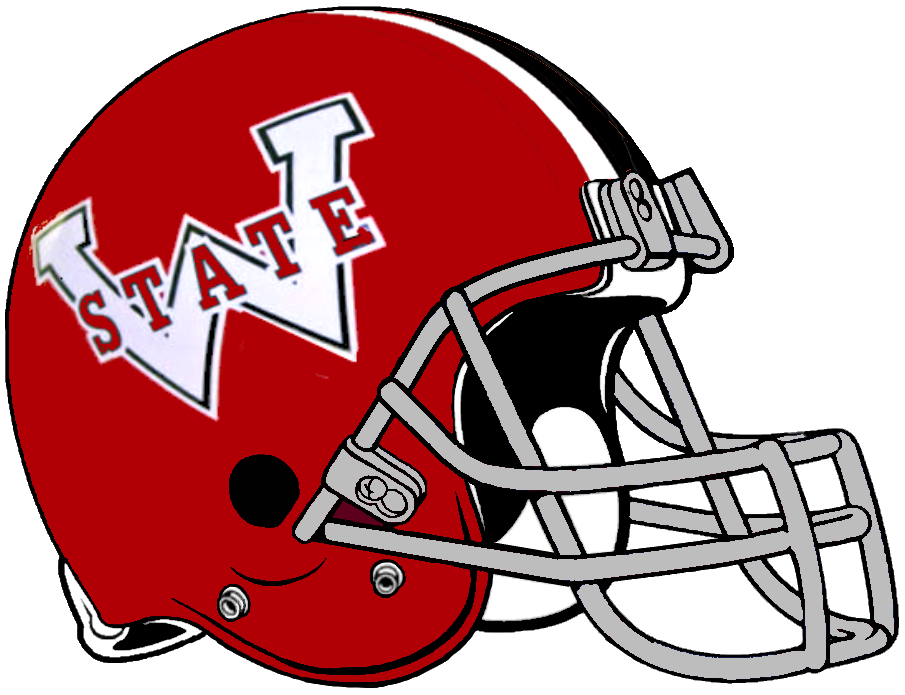
- Conference: Pacific-8 Conference
- Record: 3–8 (0–7 Pac-8)
- Head coach: Jim Sweeney (8th season)
- Offensive coordinator: Jack Elway (2nd season)
- Defensive coordinator: Larry Donovan (2nd season)
- Home stadium: Martin Stadium, Joe Albi Stadium

1975 Pacific-8 Conference football standings
	Conf.					Overall
Team	W		L		T	W		L		T
No. 5 UCLA ^ +	6	–	1	–	0	9	–	2	–	1
No. 14 California +	6	–	1	–	0	8	–	3	–	0
Stanford	5	–	2	–	0	6	–	4	–	1
Washington	5	–	2	–	0	6	–	5	–	0
No. 17 USC	3	–	4	–	0	8	–	4	–	0
Oregon	2	–	5	–	0	3	–	8	–	0
Oregon State	1	–	6	–	0	1	–	10	–	0
Washington State	0	–	7	–	0	3	–	8	–	0
+ – Conference co-champions; ^ – Selected as Rose Bowl representative; Rankings from AP Poll

The 1975 Washington State Cougars football team was an American football team that represented Washington State University in the Pacific-8 Conference (Pac-8) during the 1975 NCAA Division I football season. In their eighth season under head coach Jim Sweeney, the Cougars compiled a 3–8 record (0–7 in Pac-8, last) and were outscored 295 to 262.

The team's statistical leaders included John Hopkins with 1,022 passing yards, Vaughn Williams with 662 rushing yards, and Brian Kelly with 371 receiving yards.

With two wins to open the season, followed by seven consecutive losses, the Cougars took out their frustrations on over-matched neighbor Idaho in the Battle of the Palouse on November 15, scoring eight touchdowns in the first half on the way to an 84–27 rout. The next week at Husky Stadium in Seattle, WSU led rival Washington 27–13 with three minutes left in Don James' first Apple Cup, but gave up two long touchdowns to lose by a point.

Sweeney resigned a week later, and was promptly hired at Fresno State.

This was the first season for the concrete north grandstand at Martin Stadium; the student section, it was formerly a wooden grandstand constructed in the 1930s as part of Rogers Field. (1975 aerial photo)

== Schedule ==
Date	Opponent	Site	Result	Attendance	Source
September 13	at Kansas*	Memorial Stadium; Lawrence, KS	W 18–14	33,378	
September 20	at Utah*	Robert Rice Stadium; Salt Lake City, UT	W 30–14	19,622	
September 27	California	Martin Stadium; Pullman, WA	L 21–33	24,500	
October 4	at Illinois*	Memorial Stadium; Champaign, IL	L 21–27	51,060	
October 11	at No. 3 USC	Los Angeles Memorial Coliseum; Los Angeles, CA	L 10–28	47,468	
October 18	No. 18 UCLA	Joe Albi Stadium; Spokane, WA	L 23–37	28,500	
October 25	at Stanford	Stanford Stadium; Stanford CA	L 14–54	35,000	
November 1	Oregon^{†}	Martin Stadium; Pullman, WA	L 14–26	18,100	
November 8	at Oregon State	Parker Stadium; Corvallis, OR	L 0–7	13,489	
November 15	Idaho*	Martin Stadium; Pullman, WA (Battle of the Palouse)	W 84–27	17,300	
November 22	at Washington	Husky Stadium; Seattle, WA (Apple Cup)	L 27–28	57,100	
*Non-conference game; ^{†}Homecoming; Rankings from AP Poll released prior to the game

== Game summaries ==
=== Washington ===
Washington State Cougars at Washington Huskies

Quarter	1	2	3	4	Total
Washington St	10	14	3	0	27
Washington	7	7	0	14	28

at Husky Stadium • Seattle, Washington

- Date: November 22
- Game time: 1:30 pm PST
- Game weather: Rain • 50 °F (10 °C)
- Game attendance: 57,100

Game information

Washington St

Washington

- Warren Moon
  4/22, 126 yards, 2 TD
- Robin Earl
  9 rush, 51 yds
- Spider Gaines
  2 rec, 107 yds, 2 TD

Scoring summary

Quarter	Time	Drive			Team	Scoring information	Score	
Quarter	Time	Plays	Yards	TOP	Team	Scoring information	WSU	WASH
1					Washington St	40-yard field goal by Hedrick	3	0
1					Washington	Rowland 1-yard touchdown run, Robbins kick good	3	7
1					Washington St	Williams 3-yard touchdown run, Hedrick kick good	10	7
2					Washington St	Hopkins 1-yard touchdown run, Hedrick kick good	17	7
2					Washington St	Williams 1-yard touchdown run, Hedrick kick good	24	7
2					Washington	Gaines 29-yard touchdown reception from Moon, Robbins kick good	24	14
3					Washington St	36-yard field goal by Hedrick	27	14
4					Washington	Interception returned 93 yards for touchdown by Burleson, Robbins kick good	27	21
4					Washington	Gaines 78-yard touchdown reception from Moon, Robbins kick good	27	28
"TOP" = time of possession. For other American football terms, see Glossary of American football.							27	28

== Roster ==
1975 Washington State Cougars football team roster
Players
Coaches
Offense

Pos.	#	Name	Class
TE	80	Carl Barschig	Sr
QB	12	Wally Bennett	Jr
FB	30	Vern Chamberlain	Sr
C	60	Jon DesPois	Jr
RB	11	Dan Doornink	So
RB	31	Harold Gillum
G	54	Bob Hill	Jr
QB	18	John Hopkins	Jr
SE	44	Brian Kelly	So
SE	27	Ray Kimble	Sr
SE	21	Mike Levenseller	So
SE	3	Mike Maenhout	Sr
SE	1	Dennis Pearson	So
OT	75	Robin Ross	Sr
OT	73	Dan Smith	Sr
C	56	Dave Tobin	Sr
QB	14	Jack Thompson	Fr
FB	24	Vaughn Williams	Sr
G	70	Mark Young	Sr

Defense

Pos.	#	Name	Class
SS	41	Tony Cook	Jr
S	5	Rufus Cunningham	Sr
NT	82	Dennis Dobberpuhl	Sr
CB	37	Ken Greene	So
CB	25	Tony Heath	Sr
LB	57	Don Hover	Jr
DE	90	Mark Husfloen	Sr
LB	58	Scott Mullenix	Sr
DE	87	Tim Ochs	Jr
LB	94	Bill Patterson	Sr
CB	15	Mark Patterson	So
LB	63	Jerry Payne	Sr
DT	50	George Yarno	Fr

Special teams

Pos.	#	Name	Class
PK	33	Chuck Diedrick	Jr
P	46	Gavin Hedrick	So

Head coach

- Jim Sweeney (8th year)

Coordinators/assistant coaches

- Bill Cords (TE)
- Larry Donovan – (DC)
- Jack Elway – (OC)
- Tom Keele (OL)
- Ron Mims (DB)
- Mike Price (QB, WR)
- Dick Roach (LB)

Legend

- (C) Team captain
- (S) Suspended
- (I) Ineligible
- Injured
- Redshirt

== NFL draft ==
Four Cougars were selected in the 1976 NFL draft

Player	Position	Round	Overall	Franchise
Robin Ross	T	10	275	San Francisco
Mark Young	T	13	370	Oakland Raiders
Mark Husfloen	DE	14	383	Atlanta Falcons
Dan Smith	T	15	405	Seattle Seahawks
