= 1975 Oregon Ducks football team =

American college football season

1975 Oregon Ducks football
- Conference: Pacific-8 Conference
- Record: 3–8 (2–5 Pac-8)
- Head coach: Don Read (2nd season)
- Offensive coordinator: Gene Dahlquist (1st season)
- Defensive coordinator: Fred von Appen (2nd season)
- Captains: Don Johnson; Chuck Wills
- Home stadium: Autzen Stadium

1975 Pacific-8 Conference football standings
	Conf.					Overall
Team	W		L		T	W		L		T
No. 5 UCLA ^ +	6	–	1	–	0	9	–	2	–	1
No. 14 California +	6	–	1	–	0	8	–	3	–	0
Stanford	5	–	2	–	0	6	–	4	–	1
Washington	5	–	2	–	0	6	–	5	–	0
No. 17 USC	3	–	4	–	0	8	–	4	–	0
Oregon	2	–	5	–	0	3	–	8	–	0
Oregon State	1	–	6	–	0	1	–	10	–	0
Washington State	0	–	7	–	0	3	–	8	–	0
+ – Conference co-champions; ^ – Selected as Rose Bowl representative; Rankings from AP Poll

The 1975 Oregon Ducks football team represented the University of Oregon in the Pacific-8 Conference (Pac-8) during the 1975 NCAA Division I football season. Led by second-year head coach Don Read, the Ducks were 3–8 overall (2–5 in the Pac-8, sixth place).

Oregon defeated Utah of the WAC in late October to break a 14-game losing streak, the nation's longest at the time. They won the next week at Washington State, and the season-ending Civil War over Oregon State, the final game for Beavers' head coach Dee Andros, only his second loss in the rivalry in his eleven seasons.

== Schedule ==
Date	Time	Opponent	Site	Result	Attendance	Source
September 13	11:30 am	at No. 1 Oklahoma*	Oklahoma Memorial Stadium; Norman, OK	L 7–62	70,213	
September 20	7:30 pm	San Jose State*	Autzen Stadium; Eugene, OR	L 0–5	25,000	
September 27	11:30 am	at Minnesota*	Memorial Stadium; Minneapolis, MN	L 7–10	34,300	
October 4	1:30 pm	Washington	Autzen Stadium; Eugene, OR (rivalry)	L 17–27	28,500	
October 11	1:30 pm	California	Autzen Stadium; Eugene, OR (rivalry)	L 7–34	18,500	
October 18	1:30 pm	at No. 3 USC	Los Angeles Memorial Coliseum; Los Angeles, CA	L 3–17	50,542	
October 25	1:30 pm	Utah*	Autzen Stadium; Eugene, OR	W 18–7	10,500	
November 1	1:30 pm	at Washington State	Martin Stadium; Pullman, WA	W 26–14	18,100	
November 8	1:30 pm	UCLA	Autzen Stadium; Eugene, OR	L 17–50	15,500	
November 15	1:30 pm	at Stanford	Stanford Stadium; Stanford, CA	L 30–33	38,500	
November 22	1:30 pm	Oregon State	Autzen Stadium; Eugene, OR (Civil War)	W 14–7	35,000	
*Non-conference game; Rankings from AP Poll released prior to the game; All times are in Pacific time

== Game summaries ==
=== Oregon State ===
Oregon State at Oregon

Team	1	2	3	4	Total
Oregon State	7	0	0	0	7
• Oregon	0	7	7	0	14

- Date: November 22
- Location: Autzen Stadium, Eugene, Oregon
- Game attendance: 35,000

Scoring summary
1	1:21	OSU	Lacey 94-yard interception return (Nelson kick)	OSU 7-0
2	12:24	ORE	Willis 15-yard interception return (Woodfill kick)	Tied 7-7
3	13:21	ORE	Bennett 3-yard run (Woodfill kick)	ORE 14-7

== Roster ==
1975 Oregon Ducks football team roster
Players
Coaches
Offense

Pos.	#	Name	Class
QB	13	Jack Henderson	So
RB	35	George Bennett	Jr

Defense

Pos.	#	Name	Class
FS	12	Chuck Wills (C)	Sr
DE	88	Don Johnson (C)	Sr

Special teams

Pos.	#	Name	Class

Head coach

- Don Read (2nd year)

Coordinators/assistant coaches

- Gene Dahlquist (OC)
- Fred von Appen (DC)

Legend

- (C) Team captain
- (S) Suspended
- (I) Ineligible
- Injured
- Redshirt

== Statistics ==
=== Passing ===
Player	Att	Comp	Yards	TD	INT
Jack Henderson	151	321	1,492	6	16

=== Rushing ===
Player	Att	Yards	TD
George Bennett	175	805	7

=== Receiving ===
Player	Rec	Yards	TD
George Bauer	52	616	4
