= 1975 Oregon State Beavers football team =

American college football season

1975 Oregon State Beavers football
- Conference: Pacific-8 Conference
- Record: 1–10 (1–6 Pac-8)
- Head coach: Dee Andros (11th season)
- Home stadium: Parker Stadium; Civic Stadium

1975 Pacific-8 Conference football standings
	Conf.					Overall
Team	W		L		T	W		L		T
No. 5 UCLA ^ +	6	–	1	–	0	9	–	2	–	1
No. 14 California +	6	–	1	–	0	8	–	3	–	0
Stanford	5	–	2	–	0	6	–	4	–	1
Washington	5	–	2	–	0	6	–	5	–	0
No. 17 USC	3	–	4	–	0	8	–	4	–	0
Oregon	2	–	5	–	0	3	–	8	–	0
Oregon State	1	–	6	–	0	1	–	10	–	0
Washington State	0	–	7	–	0	3	–	8	–	0
+ – Conference co-champions; ^ – Selected as Rose Bowl representative; Rankings from AP Poll

The 1975 Oregon State Beavers football team represented Oregon State University as a member of the Pacific-8 Conference (Pac-8) during the 1975 NCAA Division I football season. In their 11th and final year under head coach Dee Andros, the Beavers were compiled an overall record of 1–10 with a mark of 1–6 in conference play, placing seventh in the Pac-10. Oregon State played three home games were played on campus at Parker Stadium in Corvallis, Oregon and two at Civic Stadium in Portland.

Following an eighth straight loss to open the season, Andros announced his resignation in early November, effective at the end of the season. Oregon State's only win came the following week, 7–0 over Washington State in a land-grant cellar matchup in Parker Stadium. In the season finale Civil War against Oregon at Eugene, the Beavers lost for the first time at Autzen Stadium.

Andros stepped down and became the OSU athletic director in late November, and retired a decade later in 1985. Craig Fertig, a 33-year-old USC assistant and former Trojan quarterback, was hired as the Beavers' head coach in December, with a three-year contract at $26,000 per year.

== Schedule ==
Date	Opponent	Site	Result	Attendance	Source
September 13	San Diego State*	Civic Stadium; Portland, OR	L 0–25	18,760	
September 19	at No. 4 USC	Los Angeles Memorial Coliseum; Los Angeles, CA	L 7–24	50,165	
September 27	at Kansas*	Memorial Stadium; Lawrence, KS	L 0–20	47,210	
October 4	No. 1 (D-II) Grambling State*	Civic Stadium; Portland, OR	L 12–19	16,964	
October 11	Colorado State*	Parker Stadium; Corvallis, OR	L 8–17	20,688	
October 18	at California	California Memorial Stadium; Berkeley, CA	L 24–51	31,758	
October 25	at Washington	Husky Stadium; Seattle, CA	L 7–35	43,500	
November 1	Stanford	Parker Stadium; Corvallis, OR	L 22–28	12,803	
November 8	Washington State^{†}	Parker Stadium; Corvallis, OR	W 7–0	13,489	
November 15	at No. 19 UCLA	Los Angeles Memorial Coliseum; Los Angeles, CA	L 9–31	30,203	
November 22	at Oregon	Autzen Stadium; Eugene, OR (Civil War)	L 7–14	35,000	
*Non-conference game; ^{†}Homecoming; Rankings from AP Poll released prior to the game
