= Terry Tautolo =

American football player (born 1954)

No. 58, 50, 52, 55
- Position: Linebacker

Personal information
- Born: August 30, 1954 (age 72); Corona, California, U.S.
- Listed height: 6 ft 2 in (1.88 m)
- Listed weight: 232 lb (105 kg)

Career information
- High school: Millikan (Long Beach, California)
- College: UCLA
- NFL draft: 1976: 13th round, 353rd overall pick

Career history
- Philadelphia Eagles (1976–1979); San Francisco 49ers (1980–1981); Detroit Lions (1981–1982); Miami Dolphins (1983); Detroit Lions (1984)

Awards and highlights
- Super Bowl champion (XVI); Second-team All-Pac-8 (1975)

Career NFL statistics
- Sacks: 2
- Fumble recoveries: 2
- Interceptions: 1
- Stats at Pro Football Reference

Terry Lynn Tautolo (born August 30, 1954) is an American former professional football player who was a linebacker for nine seasons in the National Football League (NFL) for the Philadelphia Eagles, San Francisco 49ers, Detroit Lions and Miami Dolphins. He played college football for the UCLA Bruins and was selected in the 13th round of the 1976 NFL draft.

On December 16, 2013, GQ.com's internet show "Casualties of the Gridiron" reported that Tautolo was homeless and involved in substance abuse. Tautolo's former teammates learned of his dire situation and put out a call for help. With the help of his former UCLA teammate Brent Boyd and head coach Dick Vermeil and the NFLPA, he turned his life around and currently works with special needs children.

== Career ==
Tautolo began playing flag football in elementary school, where he learned important skills such as twisting and turning to avoid tackles. His interest in sports continued into his high school years, where he played American football for the Long Beach City Junior High team, the Cecil De Mille Knights, and was a standout as a halfback. In high school, he excelled in both offensive and defensive football, and his physical ability was a key asset, though he struggled with his weight. He was advised to pursue wrestling, and by 1972, he took first place in his division at a state championship. Tautolo's athletic achievements led to him being offered a scholarship to the University of Oregon, although he chose to attend Long Beach City College instead.

In 1976, Tautolo was drafted 353rd overall in the 13th round by the Philadelphia Eagles He went on to play for several professional teams over the next nine years, including the Chicago Bears, San Francisco 49ers, Detroit Lions, and Miami Dolphins. He eventually retired from professional football in 1985 due to his decision to pursue other interests. Following his retirement from professional football, Tautolo focused on innovation, designing a Lazy Rider Reclining Infant Carrier. This invention was born out of a personal experience when he was trying to design a more comfortable bike seat for his daughter, Tasi. After several iterations, Tautolo patented the device.

== Personal life ==
Tautolo's younger brother John was an NFL guard.

Tautolo grew up in a family with five boys, with his mother, the late Fa’amaisa Matialo of Aunuʻu, American Samoa, and his father, Fa’avae Tautolo, hailing from the same island.
