= 1975 USC Trojans football team =

American college football season

1975 USC Trojans football

Liberty Bowl champion

Liberty Bowl, W 20–0 vs. Texas A&M
- Conference: Pacific-8 Conference

Ranking
- Coaches: No. 19
- AP: No. 17
- Record: 8–4 (3–4 Pac-8)
- Head coach: John McKay (16th season)
- Offensive scheme: I formation
- Base defense: 4–3
- Captains: Kevin Bruce; Danny Reece
- Home stadium: Los Angeles Memorial Coliseum

1975 Pacific-8 Conference football standings
	Conf.					Overall
Team	W		L		T	W		L		T
No. 5 UCLA ^ +	6	–	1	–	0	9	–	2	–	1
No. 14 California +	6	–	1	–	0	8	–	3	–	0
Stanford	5	–	2	–	0	6	–	4	–	1
Washington	5	–	2	–	0	6	–	5	–	0
No. 17 USC	3	–	4	–	0	8	–	4	–	0
Oregon	2	–	5	–	0	3	–	8	–	0
Oregon State	1	–	6	–	0	1	–	10	–	0
Washington State	0	–	7	–	0	3	–	8	–	0
+ – Conference co-champions; ^ – Selected as Rose Bowl representative; Rankings from AP Poll

The 1975 USC Trojans football team represented the University of Southern California (USC) in the Pacific-8 Conference during the 1975 NCAA Division I football season. In their 15th year under head coach John McKay, the Trojans compiled an 8–4 record (3–4 in Pac-8, fifth), and outscored their opponents 247 to 140. The team was ranked #17 in the final AP Poll and #19 in the final UPI Coaches Poll.

Quarterback Vince Evans led the team in passing, completing 35 of 112 passes for 695 yards with three touchdowns and nine interceptions. Ricky Bell led the team in rushing with 385 carries for 1,957 yards and 13 touchdowns. Randy Simmrin led the team in receiving with 26 catches for 478 yards and one touchdown.

Opening with seven wins, the Trojans lost all four conference games in November, and were invited to the Liberty Bowl.

Following the season, McKay stepped down as head coach to become the first head coach for the expansion Tampa Bay Buccaneers in the NFL. McKay was succeeded by Oakland Raiders running backs coach John Robinson, who previously served as the Trojans' offensive coordinator from 1972 to 1974.

== Schedule ==
Date	Opponent	Rank	Site	TV	Result	Attendance	Source
September 12	Duke*	No. 4	Los Angeles Memorial Coliseum; Los Angeles, CA		W 35–7	56,727	
September 19	Oregon State	No. 4	Los Angeles Memorial Coliseum; Los Angeles, CA		W 24–7	50,165	
September 27	Purdue*	No. 3	Los Angeles Memorial Coliseum; Los Angeles, CA		W 19–6	56,170	
October 4	at Iowa*	No. 3	Kinnick Stadium; Iowa City, IA		W 27–16	54,600	
October 11	Washington State	No. 3	Los Angeles Memorial Coliseum; Los Angeles, CA		W 28–10	47,468	
October 18	Oregon^{†}	No. 3	Los Angeles Memorial Coliseum; Los Angeles, CA		W 17–3	50,542	
October 25	at No. 14 Notre Dame*	No. 3	Notre Dame Stadium; Notre Dame, IN (rivalry)	ABC	W 24–17	59,075	
November 1	at California	No. 4	California Memorial Stadium; Berkeley, CA	ABC	L 14–28	58,871	
November 8	Stanford	No. 9	Los Angeles Memorial Coliseum; Los Angeles, CA (rivalry)		L 10–13	68,249	
November 15	at Washington	No. 13	Husky Stadium; Seattle, WA		L 7–8	53,700	
November 28	No. 14 UCLA		Los Angeles Memorial Coliseum; Los Angeles, CA (Victory Bell)	ABC	L 22–25	80,927	
December 22	vs. No. 6 Texas A&M*		Liberty Bowl Memorial Stadium; Memphis, TN (Liberty Bowl)	ABC	W 20–0	52,129	
*Non-conference game; ^{†}Homecoming; Rankings from AP Poll released prior to the game

== Game summaries ==
=== Duke ===
- Ricky Bell 34 rushes, 256 yards

=== Purdue ===
- Ricky Bell 89 rush yards

=== At Iowa ===
Team	1	2	3	4	Total
• USC	0	7	17	3	27
Iowa	10	0	0	6	16

- Date: October 4
- Location: Kinnick Stadium
- Game attendance: 54,600

Scoring summary
Q1		IOWA	Quartaro 26 yard field goal	IOWA 3–0
Q1		IOWA	Holmes 1 yard run (Quartaro kick)	IOWA 10–0
Q2	1:26	USC	Hertel 3 yard run (Walker kick)	IOWA 10–7
Q3	10:03	USC	Simmrin 10 yard pass from Hertel (Walker kick)	USC 14–10
Q3		USC	Hertel 6 yard run (Walker kick)	USC 21–10
Q3		USC	Walker 47 yard field goal	USC 24–10
Q4	11:26	USC	Walker 25 yard field goal	USC 27–10
Q4	0:20	IOWA	Wellington from McLaughlin (pass failed)	USC 27–16

=== Washington State ===
Team	1	2	3	4	Total
Washington St	3	0	0	7	10
• USC	0	14	7	7	28

- Date: October 11
- Location: Los Angeles Memorial Coliseum, Los Angeles
- Game attendance: 47,468

Scoring summary
1		Washington St	Diedrick 24-yard field goal	Washington St 3-0
2		USC	Hertel 2-yard run (Walker kick)	USC 7-3
2		USC	Reece 64-yard punt return (Walker kick)	USC 14-3
3		USC	Tatupu 28-yard run (Walker kick)	USC 21-3
4	4:42	USC	Bell 3-yard run (Walker kick)	USC 28-3
4		Washington St	Williams 5-yard run (Diedrick kick)	USC 28-10

Ricky Bell 38 Rush, 217 Yds

=== At Notre Dame ===
Team	1	2	3	4	Total
• USC	0	7	7	10	24
Notre Dame	6	8	0	3	17

- Date: October 25
- Location: Notre Dame Stadium, Notre Dame, Indiana
- Game attendance: 59,075
- TV announcers (ABC): Keith Jackson, Bud Wilkinson

Scoring summary
Q1		ND	Hunter 52 yard run (kick failed)	ND 6–0
Q2		USC	Diggs 21 yard pass from Evans (Walker kick)	USC 7–6
Q2		ND	Lopienski 13 yard blocked punt return (Haines pass from Hunter)	ND 14–7
Q3		USC	Bell 2 yard run (Walker kick)	Tie 14–14
Q4		ND	Reeve 27 yard field goal	ND 17–14
Q4	7:28	USC	Evans 2 yard run (Walker kick)	USC 21–17
Q4		USC	Walker 35 yard field goal	USC 24–17

== Roster ==
1975 USC Trojans football team roster
Players
Coaches
Offense

Pos.	#	Name	Class
RB	42	Ricky Bell	Jr
RB	21	Lynn Cain	So
WR	26	Shelton Diggs	Jr
QB	8	Vince Evans	Jr
TE	86	William Gay	So
QB	6	Rob Hertel	So
G	61	Donnie Hickman	Jr
G	66	Pat Howell	Fr
G	65	Melvin Jackson	Sr
OT	76	Marvin Powell	Jr
OT	74	John Schuhmacher	So
FB	36	Mosi Tatupu	So

Defense

Pos.	#	Name	Class
DB	44	Mike Burns	Jr
LB	58	Mario Celotto	So
LB	85	Garry Cobb	Fr
DT	92	Rich Dimler	Fr
LB	88	Ricky Jackson	Fr
DT	79	Gary Jeter	Jr
DT	96	Myron Lapka	Fr
LB	57	David Lewis	Jr
LB	52	Rod Martin	Jr
LB	60	Clay Matthews	So
DB	33	Ricky Odom	So
CB	46	Danny Reece	Sr
DB	7	Dennis Thurman	So
LB	55	Eric Williams	Jr

Special teams

Pos.	#	Name	Class
K/P	39	Glen Walker	Jr

Head coach

- John McKay

Coordinators/assistant coaches

Legend

- (C) Team captain
- (S) Suspended
- (I) Ineligible
- Injured
- Redshirt

== 1975 team players in the NFL ==
The following players were drafted into professional football following the season.

Player	Position	Round	Pick	Franchise
Danny Reece	Defensive back	3	69	Cincinnati Bengals
Joe Davis	Tackle	8	211	New York Jets
Mel Jackson	Guard	12	328	Green Bay Packers
Doug Hogan	Defensive back	16	454	Oakland Raiders

== In popular culture ==
Scenes from the November 8 game against Stanford are featured in a 1976 episode of the television series Emergency! entitled "The Game".
