= 1975 Stanford Cardinals football team =

American college football season

1975 Stanford Cardinals football
- Conference: Pacific-8 Conference
- Record: 6–4–1 (5–2 Pac-8)
- Head coach: Jack Christiansen (4th season)
- Defensive coordinator: Norb Hecker (4th season)
- Home stadium: Stanford Stadium

1975 Pacific-8 Conference football standings
	Conf.					Overall
Team	W		L		T	W		L		T
No. 5 UCLA ^ +	6	–	1	–	0	9	–	2	–	1
No. 14 California +	6	–	1	–	0	8	–	3	–	0
Stanford	5	–	2	–	0	6	–	4	–	1
Washington	5	–	2	–	0	6	–	5	–	0
No. 17 USC	3	–	4	–	0	8	–	4	–	0
Oregon	2	–	5	–	0	3	–	8	–	0
Oregon State	1	–	6	–	0	1	–	10	–	0
Washington State	0	–	7	–	0	3	–	8	–	0
+ – Conference co-champions; ^ – Selected as Rose Bowl representative; Rankings from AP Poll

The 1975 Stanford Cardinals football team represented Stanford University in the Pacific-8 Conference during the 1975 NCAA Division I football season. Led by fourth-year head coach Jack Christiansen, the Cardinals were 6–4–1 overall (5–2 in Pac-8, tie for third) and played home games on campus at Stanford Stadium in Stanford, California.

== Schedule ==
Date	Opponent	Rank	Site	Result	Attendance	Source
September 13	at No. 10 Penn State*		Beaver Stadium; University Park, PA	L 14–34	61,325	
September 20	at No. 2 Michigan*		Michigan Stadium; Ann Arbor, MI	T 19–19	92,304	
September 27	San Jose State*	No. 18	Stanford Stadium; Stanford, CA (rivalry)	L 34–36	43,000	
October 4	at Army*		Stanford Stadium; Stanford, CA	W 67–14	38,500	
October 11	No. 15 UCLA		Stanford Stadium; Stanford, CA	L 21–31	52,500	
October 18	at Washington		Husky Stadium; Seattle, WA	W 24–21	45,000	
October 25	Washington State		Stanford Stadium; Stanford, CA	W 54–14	35,000	
November 1	at Oregon State		Parker Stadium; Corvallis, OR	W 28–22	12,803	
November 8	at No. 9 USC		Los Angeles Memorial Coliseum; Los Angeles, CA (rivalry)	W 13–10	68,249	
November 15	Oregon		Stanford Stadium; Stanford, CA	W 33–30	38,500	
November 22	No. 13 California		Stanford Stadium; Stanford, CA (Big Game)	L 15–48	88,000	
*Non-conference game; Rankings from AP Poll released prior to the game

== Game summaries ==
=== Michigan ===
Team	1	2	3	4	Total
Stanford	6	0	0	13	19
Michigan	0	7	6	6	19

- Date: September 20
- Location: Michigan Stadium • Ann Arbor, Michigan
- Game attendance: 92,304

Scoring summary
1		STAN	Tony Hill 25-yard pass from Mike Cordova (kick failed)	Stanford 6-0
2		MICH	Jim Smith 48-yard pass from Rick Leach (Bob Wood kick)	Michigan 7-6
3		MICH	Bob Wood 27-yard field goal	Michigan 10-6
3		MICH	Bob Wood 29-yard field goal	Michigan 13-6
4		STAN	Todd Anderson 4-yard pass from Mike Cordova (Mike Langford kick)	Tie 13-13
4	5:51	MICH	Bob Wood 32-yard field goal	Michigan 16-13
4	3:41	STAN	Mike Langford 40-yard field goal	Tie 16-16
4	1:46	MICH	Bob Wood 42-yard field goal	Michigan 19-16
4	0:09	STAN	Mike Langford 33-yard field goal	Tie 19-19

=== Army ===
Team	1	2	3	4	Total
Army	0	0	8	6	14
• Stanford	17	22	21	7	67

- Date: October 4
- Location: Stanford Stadium

Scoring summary
Q1	STAN	Langford 38 yard field goal	STAN 3–0
Q1	STAN	Finley 9 yard run (Langford kick)	STAN 10–0
Q1	STAN	Finley 1 yard run (Langford kick)	STAN 17–0
Q2	STAN	Inge 22 yard pass from Cordova (Strong pass from Waldvoget)	STAN 25–0
Q2	STAN	Kellar 42 yard pass from Cordova (Langford kick)	STAN 32–0
Q2	STAN	Pappas 7 yard pass from Cordova (Langford kick)	STAN 39–0
Q3	ARMY	Dodrill 10 yard run (Gillogly run)	STAN 39–8
Q3	STAN	Ostrom 3 yard pass from Cordova (Langford kick)	STAN 46–8
Q3	STAN	Ostrom 3 yard run (Langford kick)	STAN 53–8
Q3	STAN	Baumgartner 4 yard run (Langford kick)	STAN 60–8
Q4	ARMY	Dodrill 39 yard pass from Hall (pass failed)	STAN 60–14
Q4	STAN	???	STAN 67–14

- Mike Cordova 246 pass yds, 4 TD (sat out fourth quarter)
- Don Stevenson 102 rush yds

== Roster ==
- WR Tony Hill
