= Joe Roth (American football) =

American football player (1955–1977)

No. 12
- Position: Quarterback

Personal information
- Born: May 29, 1955; San Diego, California, U.S.
- Died: February 19, 1977 (aged 21); Berkeley, California, U.S.
- Listed height: 6 ft 4 in (1.93 m)
- Listed weight: 205 lb (93 kg)

Career information
- High school: Granite Hills (El Cajon, California)
- College: Grossmont CC (1973–1974); California (1975–1976)

Awards and highlights
- First-team All-American (1976); Second-team All-Pac-8 (1975); California Golden Bears No. 12 retired

Joseph Lawrence Roth (May 29, 1955 – February 19, 1977) was an American college football player who was an All-American (Note: https://calbears.com/sports/2014/10/17/209722727.aspx) (Note: https://calbears.com/sports/football/roster/joe-roth/7518) quarterback for the California Golden Bears. Roth played the 1976 season knowing he was dying of melanoma; he died in February 1977, three months after his last regular season game and just weeks after playing an all-star game in Japan. His jersey, number 12, is the only one ever retired by the California Golden Bears football program. He was, at the time of his passing, describe as "the greatest quarterback in Cal history."

== Biography ==
A 1973 graduate of Granite Hills High School in El Cajon, Roth led Grossmont College of El Cajon to an undefeated season and state title in 1974, and transferred to the University of California, Berkeley in 1975.

=== Time at Cal ===
Originally a back-up, he started the fourth game of the 1975 season, and led the Golden Bears to the Pac-8 title as co-champions. Roth threw for 14 touchdowns, 1,880 yards, and 55.0 completion percentage. Cal led the nation in total offense, gaining the same yardage both passing and rushing with 2,522 yards each.

In 1976, Roth was a pre-season favorite for the Heisman Trophy. Despite a more tumultuous season with fewer dominant performances towards its end, Roth threw for 1,889 yards, 379 of which came in one game against Georgia; he was named an All-American and finished ninth in the Heisman Trophy voting that year.

=== Recurrence of cancer ===
After the season ended, he revealed that halfway through it he had noticed a lump on his chest and was subsequently diagnosed with terminal melanoma. He also revealed that he had been receiving chemotherapy treatment in the latter part of the season at the University of California San Francisco Medical Center.

The lump on his chest was the metastasis of a mole removed three years earlier at the age of 18. The mole from his first bout with cancer was located on an area of his neck behind his left ear; when he had surgery to remove the mole, it required that doctors remove five ounces of tissue from his neck.

Despite his deteriorating physical condition, he had honored his commitments to play in both the Hula Bowl and the Japan Bowl. According to his coach's reminiscence, during the Japan Bowl festivities Roth had agreed to sit for a thirty-minute autograph session; but finding, at the end of the scheduled time, hundreds of children still waiting, he continued to sign until every child had an autograph, after which he left the building and vomited.

"Dying is not so tough. For the last three years I've lived with the realization that the next day might be my last. I'm lucky to be here as long as I was, so don't feel any pity."

By mid-February 1977 he was in the hospital, where (in the words of the San Francisco Chronicle)

a doctor wanted to amputate both legs, but Roth did not want to die in pieces. What he wanted was to die among his friends and family at his Berkeley apartment. The ambulance delivered him, and his teammates carried him up three flights of stairs. Two days later, they carried his body back down.

Roth died at age 21 on February 19, 1977 "surrounded by family, friends and many of his former teammates and coaches, including coach Mike White."

== Honors ==
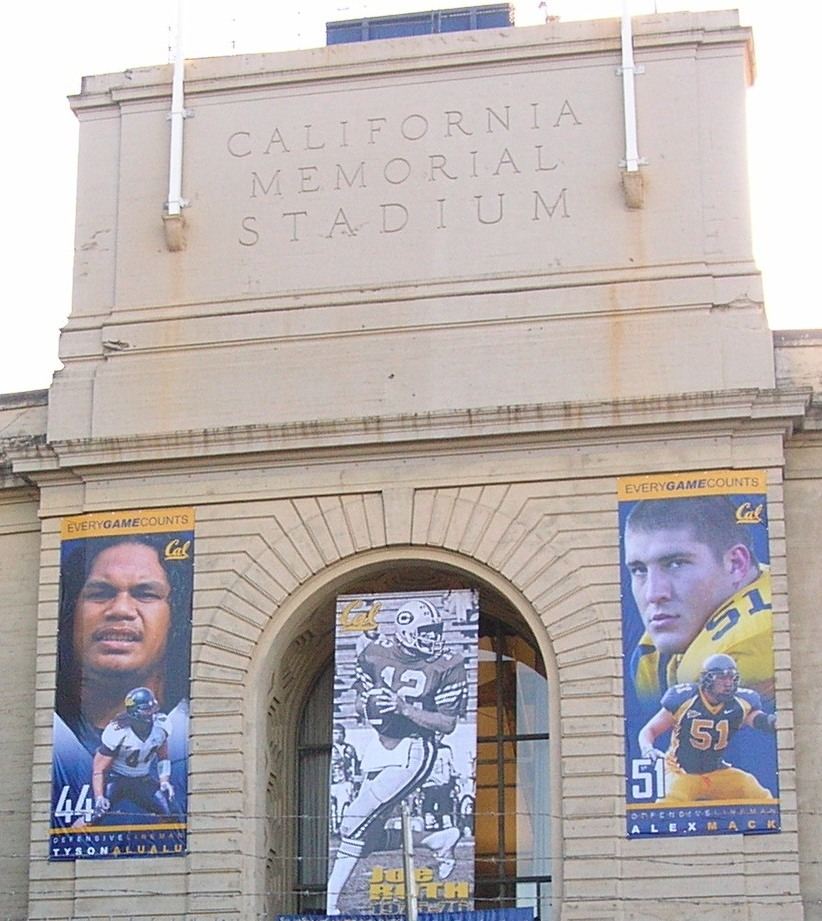
California Memorial Stadium before the 2008 Joe Roth Memorial Game against UCLA.

NFL commissioner Pete Rozelle opened the 1977 NFL draft in early May with a moment of silence for Roth.

Posthumously, Roth received the Berkeley Citation in 1977, awarded to those "whose attainments significantly exceed the standards of excellence in their fields and whose contributions to UC Berkeley are manifestly above and beyond the call of duty." In 2000, he was inducted into the University of California Athletic Hall of Fame. Several awards are named for him, including the Joe Roth Award, for the high school player in the San Diego area who best demonstrates courage; the Joe Roth Memorial Award, given to the San Diego County junior college football player who best exemplifies high academic standards and athletic excellence; the Joe Roth Memorial Award, which was given as the MVP award for the Japan Bowl; and the Joe Roth Award, given to the Cal football player who best demonstrates courage, attitude, and sportsmanship.

Cal football designated each year's home game against either USC or UCLA as the Joe Roth Memorial Game until leaving the Pac-12. Cal wore throwback uniforms similar to those the Bears wore during Roth's career for the 2007 Roth Memorial Game and has continued to do so since 2017. The Bears also would occasionally wear Roth-era road throwbacks when playing at USC and UCLA.

A documentary, Don't Quit: The Joe Roth Story, was released in 2015.

== See also ==
- List of gridiron football players who died during their careers
- California Golden Bears Football
- California Memorial Stadium
