= John Tautolo =

American football player (1959–2025)

No. 65, 66, 61
- Position: Guard

Personal information
- Born: May 29, 1959; Long Beach, California, U.S.
- Died: June 9, 2025 (aged 66); Moreno Valley, California, U.S.
- Listed height: 6 ft 3 in (1.91 m)
- Listed weight: 267 lb (121 kg)

Career information
- High school: Robert A. Millikan (Long Beach)
- College: UCLA
- NFL draft: 1981: undrafted

Career history
- New England Patriots (1981)*; New York Giants (1982–1983); Portland Breakers (1985); Los Angeles Raiders (1987)
- * Offseason or practice squad member only

Awards and highlights
- Second-team All-Pac-10 (1980)

Career NFL statistics
- Games played: 10
- Games started: 5
- Stats at Pro Football Reference

John William Tautolo (May 29, 1959 – June 9, 2025) was an American professional football player who was a guard in the National Football League (NFL) and United States Football League (USFL). He played college football for the UCLA Bruins. Tautolo played in the NFL for the New York Giants from 1982 to 1983 and Los Angeles Raiders in 1987. He had a stint in the USFL with the Portland Breakers in 1985.

Tautolo's older brother Terry played as a linebacker in the NFL.

On June 12, 2025, the Raiders announced that Tautolo had died on June 9, at the age of 66.
