= 1975 NCAA Division I football season =

American college football season

- Preseason AP No. 1: Oklahoma
- Regular season: September 4 – December 6, 1975
- Number of bowls: 11
- Bowl games: December 20, 1975 – January 1, 1976
- Champion(s): Oklahoma (AP, Coaches, FWAA, NFF)
- Heisman: Ohio State running back Archie Griffin

The 1975 NCAA Division I football season saw University of Oklahoma repeat as national champion in the Associated Press (AP) writers' poll and were ranked No. 1 in the final United Press International (UPI) coaches' poll, just ahead of Arizona State, runners-up in both AP and Coaches final polls. ASU finished as the only undefeated team of the season with their victory over Nebraska in the Fiesta Bowl. Arizona State was recognized by the Sporting News and National Championship Foundation as the No. 1 ranked team in the nation.

During the 20th century, the NCAA had no playoff for major college football teams that would later be described as "Division I-A". The NCAA Football Guide, however, did note an "unofficial national champion" based on the top ranked teams in the "wire service" (AP and UPI) polls. The "writers' poll" by Associated Press (AP) was the most popular, followed by the "coaches' poll" by United Press International) (UPI). The AP poll consisted of the votes of as many as 63 writers, though not all voted in each poll, and the UPI poll was taken of a 25-member board of coaches.

== Rule changes ==
- Jerseys are required to be changed if the shoulder pads are exposed and/or the uniform numbers become unreadable.
- The game ball composition and appearance are standardized.
- The team bench area is expanded from between the 35-yard lines to between the 30-yard lines.
- Penalty enforcement of fouls committed during kickoffs, field goal attempts, and punts when the ball is not in possession of either team is from the spot of the foul, changed from the previous spot. This rule was adopted by the National Football League in 1973.
- The referee has the authority (without consulting with the two coaches) to suspend a game due to severe weather (lightning, etc.).
- If a player is observed playing without a mouthpiece, his team will be charged a time-out (or a five-yard penalty if out of time-outs) to correct.

In addition to the following programs the Southland Conference was also classified as University Division.

== Conference and program changes ==
School	1974 Conference	1975 Conference
Ball State Cardinals	D-II Independent	MAC
Central Michigan Chippewas	D-II Independent	MAC
Indiana State Sycamores	D-II Independent	D-I Independent
Louisville Cardinals	Missouri Valley	D-I Independent
Northern Illinois Huskies	D-I Independent	MAC
North Texas State Mean Green	Missouri Valley	D-I Independent
Wisconsin–Milwaukee Panthers	D-II Independent	Dropped Program

Tampa Spartans (last season as independent in 1974)

== September ==
In the preseason poll released on September 1, the AP ranked Oklahoma first, followed by Alabama, Michigan, Ohio State and USC.

September 6: Most teams had yet to open their seasons, but No. 2 Alabama lost its home opener in Birmingham to unranked Missouri, 20–7. No. 6 Penn State was the only other top 10 team to play the weekend. The Nittany Lions struggled to defeat Temple in a game in Philadelphia, winning 26–25. In the next poll, Penn State fell to 10th and Alabama dropped to 13th. The top five were No. 1 Oklahoma, No. 2 Michigan, No. 3 Ohio State, No. 4 USC, and No. 5 Missouri.

September 13: No. 1 Oklahoma beat Oregon 62–7. No. 2 Michigan won at Wisconsin, 23–6. No. 3 Ohio State won at No. 11 Michigan State 21–0. No. 4 USC beat Duke 35–7 at home and No. 5 Missouri was idle. The top five remained the same.

September 20: No. 1 Oklahoma beat No. 15 Pittsburgh 46–10, and Michigan was tied by Stanford at home, 19–19. No. 3 Ohio State beat No. 7 Penn State 17–9. No. 4 USC defeated Oregon State 24–7. No. 5 Missouri won at Illinois, 30–20. Missouri's Big Eight rival, No. 6 Nebraska, beat Indiana 45–0, and rose into the top five. The next poll featured No. 1 Oklahoma, No. 2 Ohio State, No. 3 USC, No. 4 Nebraska, and No. 5 Missouri.

September 26–27: In a Friday night game at the Orange Bowl, No. 1 Oklahoma eked out a win over Miami, 20–17. The next day, No. 2 Ohio State beat North Carolina 32–7. No. 3 USC beat visiting Purdue, 19–6. Nebraska beat TCU 56–14, and No. 5 Missouri edged Wisconsin, 27–21. The top five remained the same.

== October ==
October 4: No. 1 Oklahoma had another narrow win, beating visiting No. 19 Colorado, 21–20, while in Los Angeles, No. 2 Ohio State had no problems in defeating No. 13 UCLA, 41–20. No. 3 USC won 27–16 at Iowa, and No. 4 Nebraska defeated the Miami Hurricanes at home, 31–16. No. 5 Missouri played its third straight game against a Big Ten team, losing at No. 12 Michigan, 31–7. After a promising start, the Tigers would go on to a 6–5 finish. No. 7 Texas, which beat Utah State 61–7, rose to the top five. Ohio State took over first place from Oklahoma with 47 of the 62 first place votes, followed by No. 2 Oklahoma, No. 3 USC, No. 4 Nebraska, and No. 5 Texas.

October 11: No. 1 Ohio State beat visiting Iowa 49–0. In their annual meeting in Dallas, No. 2 Oklahoma defeated No. 5 Texas 24–17. No. 3 USC beat Washington State 28–10. No. 4 Nebraska beat visiting Kansas 16–0. No. 6 Texas A&M won 38–9 at Texas Tech. The next poll featured No. 1 Ohio State, No. 2 Oklahoma, No. 3 USC, No. 4 Nebraska, and No. 5 Texas A&M.

October 18: No. 1 Ohio State had a second straight shutout at home, 56–0 over Wisconsin, and No. 2 Oklahoma won 25–3 at Kansas State. No. 3 USC beat visiting Oregon 17–3. No. 4 Nebraska won 28–20 at Oklahoma State, and No. 5 Texas A&M won at TCU, 14–6. The top five remained the same.

October 25: No. 1 Ohio State won 35–6 at Purdue, No. 2 Oklahoma beat Iowa State, 39–7, and No. 3 USC won at No. 14 Notre Dame, 24–17. No. 4 Nebraska beat No. 10 Colorado, 63–21, and No. 5 Texas A&M beat Baylor at home, 19–10. USC's close game and Nebraska's blowout caused a slight change in the next poll: No. 1 Ohio State, No. 2 Oklahoma, No. 3 Nebraska, No. 4 USC, and No. 5 Texas A&M.

== November ==
November 1: No. 1 Ohio State defeated Indiana at home, 24–14, No. 2 Oklahoma won 27–7 at No. 19 Oklahoma State, and No. 3 Nebraska won 30–7 at No. 12 Missouri. Coach John McKay announced he would be leaving USC after the season to coach the NFL's expansion Tampa Bay Buccaneers and No. 4 USC abruptly lost 28–14 at California, beginning a four-game losing streak after a 7–0 start. No. 5 Texas A&M was idle, and No. 6 Alabama beat Mississippi State in Jackson, 21–10. The next poll featured No. 1 Ohio State, No. 2 Oklahoma, No. 3 Nebraska, No. 4 Texas A&M, and No. 5 Alabama.

November 8: No. 1 Ohio State won at Illinois, 40–3, but No. 2 Oklahoma was stunned 23–3 in Norman by the visiting Kansas Jayhawks, led by quarterback Nolan Cromwell. No. 3 Nebraska won at Kansas State, 12–0. No. 4 Texas A&M beat SMU, 36–3, and No. 5 Alabama won 23–10 at LSU. No. 6 Michigan, which beat Purdue 28–0, replaced Oklahoma in the top five: No. 1 Ohio State, No. 2 Nebraska, No. 3 Texas A&M, No. 4 Michigan, and No. 5 Alabama.

November 15: No. 1 Ohio State beat Minnesota 38–6, and No. 2 Nebraska beat Iowa State 52–0. No. 3 Texas A&M won 33–14 at Rice, and No. 4 Michigan won 21–15 at Illinois to extend its record to 8–0–2, while No. 5 Alabama beat Southern Mississippi at home, 27–6. The top five remained the same.

November 22: The game that determined the Big Ten championship took place in Ann Arbor, Michigan, as unbeaten (10–0) No. 1 Ohio State visited unbeaten, but twice tied (8–0–2) No. 4 Michigan in the seventh matchup of "The Ten Year War." OSU won 21–14 and got the trip to the Rose Bowl. In Norman, Oklahoma, a trip to the Orange Bowl was on the line as No. 2 Nebraska (10–0) closed its season against No. 7 Oklahoma (9–1) in a game for the Big Eight title. Oklahoma handed the Cornhuskers their first loss, 35–10, and Nebraska settled for a berth in the Fiesta Bowl. No. 3 Texas A&M, No. 5 Alabama, and No. 6 Texas were all idle, but advanced in the next poll: No. 1 Ohio State, No. 2 Texas A&M, No. 3 Oklahoma, No. 4 Alabama, and No. 5 Texas.

November 29: No. 2 Texas A&M (9–0) hosted No. 5 Texas (9–1) at College Station, with the Aggies winning, 20–10. No. 4 Alabama closed its season with its tenth straight win after its opening loss, a 28–0 win over Auburn in Birmingham, and clinched the SEC title and a Sugar Bowl berth against Penn State. By defeating USC 25−22, No. 14 UCLA earned the Pac-8 championship and a Rose Bowl rematch with Ohio State, who had defeated them in early October.

The final AP poll released on December 1 was led by two undefeated teams, No. 1 Ohio State (11–0) and No. 2 Texas A&M (10–0), followed by No. 3 Oklahoma and No. 4 Alabama (both 10−1). No. 5 Michigan (8−1−2) would be Oklahoma's opponent in the Orange Bowl. No. 7 Arizona State, which was undefeated at 11−0 but had been unable to crack the top five all year, would meet No. 6 Nebraska (10−1) in the Fiesta Bowl.

On December 6, after the final AP Poll had already been taken, No. 2 Texas A&M lost in Little Rock to No. 18 Arkansas, 31–6. The Southwest Conference race finished with a three way tie between Arkansas, Texas and Texas A&M, all 6–1 in conference play. Arkansas got the Cotton Bowl berth against SEC runner-up Georgia, while Texas went to the Bluebonnet Bowl and Texas A&M to the Liberty Bowl.

== Conference standings ==
1975 Atlantic Coast Conference football standings
	Conf.					Overall
Team	W		L		T	W		L		T
No. 13 Maryland $	5	–	0	–	0	9	–	2	–	1
Duke	3	–	0	–	2	4	–	5	–	2
NC State	2	–	2	–	1	7	–	4	–	1
Wake Forest	3	–	3	–	0	3	–	8	–	0
Clemson	2	–	3	–	0	2	–	9	–	0
North Carolina	1	–	4	–	1	3	–	7	–	1
Virginia	0	–	4	–	0	1	–	10	–	0
$ – Conference champion; Rankings from AP Poll

1975 Big Eight Conference football standings
	Conf.					Overall
Team	W		L		T	W		L		T
No. 1 Oklahoma +	6	–	1	–	0	11	–	1	–	0
No. 9 Nebraska +	6	–	1	–	0	10	–	2	–	0
No. 16 Colorado	5	–	2	–	0	9	–	3	–	0
Kansas	4	–	3	–	0	7	–	5	–	0
Missouri	3	–	4	–	0	6	–	5	–	0
Oklahoma State	3	–	4	–	0	7	–	4	–	0
Iowa State	1	–	6	–	0	4	–	7	–	0
Kansas State	0	–	7	–	0	3	–	8	–	0
+ – Conference co-champions; Rankings from AP Poll

1975 Big Sky Conference football standings
	Conf.					Overall
Team	W		L		T	W		L		T
No. 6 Boise State $^	5	–	0	–	1	9	–	2	–	1
Idaho State	4	–	2	–	0	7	–	3	–	0
Montana State	4	–	2	–	0	5	–	5	–	0
Idaho	2	–	2	–	2	4	–	5	–	2
Montana	3	–	3	–	0	6	–	4	–	0
Weber State	1	–	4	–	1	1	–	9	–	1
Northern Arizona	0	–	6	–	0	1	–	9	–	0
$ – Conference champion; ^ – NCAA Division II playoff participant; Rankings from NCAA Division II AP Poll

1975 Big Ten Conference football standings
	Conf.					Overall
Team	W		L		T	W		L		T
No. 4 Ohio State $	8	–	0	–	0	11	–	1	–	0
No. 8 Michigan	7	–	1	–	0	8	–	2	–	2
Michigan State	4	–	4	–	0	7	–	4	–	0
Illinois	4	–	4	–	0	5	–	6	–	0
Purdue	4	–	4	–	0	4	–	7	–	0
Wisconsin	3	–	4	–	1	4	–	6	–	1
Minnesota	3	–	5	–	0	6	–	5	–	0
Iowa	3	–	5	–	0	3	–	8	–	0
Northwestern	2	–	6	–	0	3	–	8	–	0
Indiana	1	–	6	–	1	2	–	8	–	1
$ – Conference champion; Rankings from AP Poll

1975 Ivy League football standings
	Conf.					Overall
Team	W		L		T	W		L		T
Harvard $	6	–	1	–	0	7	–	2	–	0
Brown	5	–	1	–	1	6	–	2	–	1
Yale	5	–	2	–	0	7	–	2	–	0
Dartmouth	4	–	2	–	1	5	–	3	–	1
Princeton	3	–	4	–	0	4	–	5	–	0
Penn	2	–	5	–	0	3	–	6	–	0
Columbia	2	–	5	–	0	2	–	7	–	0
Cornell	0	–	7	–	0	1	–	8	–	0
$ – Conference champion

1975 Mid-American Conference football standings
	Conf.					Overall
Team	W		L		T	W		L		T
No. 12 Miami (OH) $	6	–	0	–	0	11	–	1	–	0
Central Michigan	4	–	1	–	1	8	–	2	–	1
Ball State	4	–	2	–	0	9	–	2	–	0
Bowling Green	4	–	2	–	0	8	–	3	–	0
Ohio	3	–	3	–	1	5	–	5	–	1
Toledo	4	–	4	–	0	5	–	6	–	0
Northern Illinois	2	–	3	–	0	3	–	8	–	0
Kent State	1	–	6	–	0	4	–	7	–	0
Western Michigan	0	–	7	–	0	1	–	10	–	0
$ – Conference champion; Rankings from AP Poll

1975 Missouri Valley Conference football standings
	Conf.					Overall
Team	W		L		T	W		L		T
Tulsa $	4	–	0	–	0	7	–	4	–	0
New Mexico State	2	–	2	–	0	5	–	6	–	0
West Texas State	2	–	2	–	0	5	–	6	–	0
Drake	1	–	3	–	0	3	–	8	–	0
Wichita State	1	–	3	–	0	3	–	8	–	0
$ – Conference champion

1975 Pacific Coast Athletic Association football standings
	Conf.					Overall
Team	W		L		T	W		L		T
San Jose State $	5	–	0	–	0	9	–	2	–	0
Long Beach State	4	–	1	–	0	9	–	2	–	0
San Diego State	3	–	2	–	0	8	–	3	–	0
Pacific (CA)	2	–	3	–	0	5	–	6	–	1
Fresno State	1	–	4	–	0	3	–	8	–	0
Cal State Fullerton	0	–	5	–	0	2	–	9	–	0
$ – Conference champion

1975 Pacific-8 Conference football standings
	Conf.					Overall
Team	W		L		T	W		L		T
No. 5 UCLA ^ +	6	–	1	–	0	9	–	2	–	1
No. 14 California +	6	–	1	–	0	8	–	3	–	0
Stanford	5	–	2	–	0	6	–	4	–	1
Washington	5	–	2	–	0	6	–	5	–	0
No. 17 USC	3	–	4	–	0	8	–	4	–	0
Oregon	2	–	5	–	0	3	–	8	–	0
Oregon State	1	–	6	–	0	1	–	10	–	0
Washington State	0	–	7	–	0	3	–	8	–	0
+ – Conference co-champions; ^ – Selected as Rose Bowl representative; Rankings from AP Poll

1975 Southern Conference football standings
	Conf.					Overall
Team	W		L		T	W		L		T
Richmond $	5	–	1	–	0	5	–	6	–	0
East Carolina	4	–	2	–	0	8	–	3	–	0
Appalachian State	3	–	2	–	0	8	–	3	–	0
The Citadel	4	–	3	–	0	6	–	5	–	0
William & Mary	2	–	3	–	0	2	–	9	–	0
Furman	2	–	4	–	0	5	–	5	–	1
VMI	2	–	4	–	0	3	–	8	–	0
Davidson	0	–	3	–	0	1	–	8	–	0
$ – Conference champion

1975 Southeastern Conference football standings
	Conf.					Overall
Team	W		L		T	W		L		T
No. 3 Alabama $	6	–	0	–	0	11	–	1	–	0
Florida	5	–	1	–	0	9	–	3	–	0
No. 19 Georgia	5	–	1	–	0	9	–	3	–	0
Ole Miss	5	–	1	–	0	6	–	5	–	0
Tennessee	3	–	3	–	0	7	–	5	–	0
Vanderbilt	2	–	4	–	0	7	–	4	–	0
LSU	2	–	4	–	0	5	–	6	–	0
Auburn	2	–	4	–	0	3	–	6	–	2
Mississippi State	1	–	4	–	1	6	–	4	–	1
Kentucky	0	–	6	–	0	2	–	8	–	1
$ – Conference champion; Mississippi State later forfeited 4 1975 wins and one tie due to NCAA violations.; Rankings from AP Poll

1975 Southland Conference football standings
	Conf.					Overall
Team	W		L		T	W		L		T
Arkansas State $	5	–	0	–	0	11	–	0	–	0
Louisiana Tech	4	–	1	–	1	8	–	2	–	0
McNeese State	3	–	2	–	0	7	–	4	–	0
Southwestern Louisiana	2	–	3	–	0	6	–	5	–	0
UT Arlington	1	–	4	–	0	4	–	7	–	0
Lamar	0	–	5	–	0	1	–	10	–	0
$ – Conference champion

1975 Southwest Conference football standings
	Conf.					Overall
Team	W		L		T	W		L		T
No. 7 Arkansas +	6	–	1	–	0	10	–	2	–	0
No. 6 Texas +	6	–	1	–	0	10	–	2	–	0
No. 11 Texas A&M +	6	–	1	–	0	10	–	2	–	0
Texas Tech	4	–	3	–	0	6	–	5	–	0
Baylor	2	–	5	–	0	3	–	6	–	2
SMU	2	–	5	–	0	4	–	7	–	0
Rice	1	–	6	–	0	2	–	9	–	0
TCU	1	–	6	–	0	1	–	10	–	0
+ – Conference co-champions; Rankings from AP Poll

1975 Western Athletic Conference football standings
	Conf.					Overall
Team	W		L		T	W		L		T
No. 2 Arizona State $	7	–	0	–	0	12	–	0	–	0
No. 18 Arizona	5	–	2	–	0	9	–	2	–	0
Colorado State	4	–	2	–	0	6	–	5	–	0
BYU	4	–	3	–	0	6	–	5	–	0
New Mexico	4	–	3	–	0	6	–	5	–	0
Utah	1	–	4	–	0	1	–	10	–	0
Wyoming	1	–	6	–	0	2	–	9	–	0
UTEP	0	–	6	–	0	1	–	10	–	0
$ – Conference champion; Rankings from AP Poll

1975 NCAA Division I independents football records
	Conf.			Overall
Team	W	L	T	W		L		T
Rutgers		–		9	–	2	–	0
No. 10 Penn State		–		9	–	3	–	0
No. 20 West Virginia		–		9	–	3	–	0
Notre Dame		–		8	–	3	–	0
Virginia Tech		–		8	–	3	–	0
No. 15 Pittsburgh		–		8	–	4	–	0
Boston College		–		7	–	4	–	0
Georgia Tech		–		7	–	4	–	0
Memphis State		–		7	–	4	–	0
Navy		–		7	–	4	–	0
North Texas State		–		7	–	4	–	0
Southern Miss		–		7	–	4	–	0
South Carolina		–		7	–	5	–	0
Colgate		–		6	–	4	–	0
Cincinnati		–		6	–	5	–	0
Hawaii		–		6	–	5	–	0
Syracuse		–		6	–	5	–	0
Temple		–		6	–	5	–	0
Utah State		–		6	–	5	–	0
Dayton		–		5	–	6	–	0
Northeast Louisiana		–		4	–	6	–	1
Tulane		–		4	–	7	–	0
Villanova		–		4	–	7	–	0
Florida State		–		3	–	8	–	0
Air Force		–		2	–	8	–	1
Houston		–		2	–	8	–	0
Miami (FL)		–		2	–	8	–	0
Army		–		2	–	9	–	0
Marshall		–		2	–	9	–	0
Southern Illinois		–		1	–	9	–	1
Holy Cross		–		1	–	10	–	0
Louisville		–		1	–	10	–	0
Rankings from AP Poll

== Bowl games ==
=== Major bowls ===
Thursday, January 1, 1976

BOWL				
COTTON	No. 18 Arkansas Razorbacks	31	No. 12 Georgia Bulldogs	10
SUGAR	No. 4 Alabama Crimson Tide	13	No. 8 Penn State Nittany Lions	6
ROSE	No. 11 UCLA Bruins	23	No. 1 Ohio State Buckeyes	10
ORANGE	No. 3 Oklahoma Sooners	14	No. 5 Michigan Wolverines	6

This was the first season that both the Pac-8 and Big Ten conferences allowed their teams to play in bowl games other than the Rose Bowl. Unranked USC (7–4), fifth in the Pac-8 (3–4) after four straight losses in November, was invited to the Liberty Bowl, which was head coach John McKay's final game before going to the NFL to coach the expansion Tampa Bay Buccaneers. California won their first conference title in 17 years, sharing it with UCLA, but the Bruins beat the Bears in late October and were awarded the Rose Bowl berth. Cal, Washington, and Stanford had beat and finished ahead of USC in the Pac-8 standings, but all three stayed home during the bowls. Michigan, the Big Ten runner-up, was invited to play Oklahoma in the Orange Bowl, which passed over higher-ranked Alabama (10–1), who met Penn State in the Sugar Bowl, rather than the higher-ranked Big 8 runner-up, Nebraska. The Huskers went to the Fiesta Bowl to play host Arizona State (11–0).

USC sent McKay out a winner and climbed to 17th, as they shut out uninspired Texas A&M, still reeling from being upset by Arkansas on December 6 and losing out on the Cotton Bowl bid. The day after Christmas, Arizona State, the WAC champion, won arguably the biggest game to date in their history over Big 8 runner-up Nebraska, 17–14. Arizona State was one of two Division I teams to finish undefeated and untied as they completed a 12–0 season. Another ASU, Arkansas State, also finished unbeaten and untied, but were unranked. New Year's Eve saw Alabama beat Penn State 13–6 in the Sugar Bowl. On New Year's Day, Arkansas beat SEC runner up Georgia in the Cotton Bowl 31–10. The Rose Bowl was a rematch between No. 1 Ohio State and No. 11 UCLA; Ohio State had beaten UCLA in Los Angeles on October 4, 41–20. After that game, Ohio State coach Woody Hayes was so impressed by UCLA in defeat, he predicted that his Buckeyes would be playing the Bruins again in the Rose Bowl. This time, the 11th-ranked Bruins (8–2–1) handed the previously undefeated and No. 1 ranked Buckeyes a 23–10 loss. UCLA was the only team to score more than 14 points on Ohio State all season, and they did it twice. No. 3 Oklahoma (10–1) defeated No. 5 Michigan (8–1–2), 14–6, in the Orange Bowl to claim the national title. The final rankings were 1.Oklahoma 2.Arizona State 3.Ohio State 4.Alabama 5.UCLA

=== Other bowls ===
BOWL	Location	Date	Winner	Score	Runner-up
FIESTA	Tempe, AZ	December 26	No. 7 Arizona State	17–14	No. 6 Nebraska
SUN	El Paso, TX	December 26	No. 20 Pittsburgh	33–19	No. 19 Kansas
LIBERTY	Memphis, TN	December 22	USC	20–0	No. 2 Texas A&M
GATOR	Jacksonville, FL	December 29	No. 17 Maryland	13–0	No. 13 Florida
TANGERINE	Orlando, FL	December 20	No. 16 Miami (OH)	20–7	South Carolina
ASTRO-BLUEBONNET	Houston, TX	December 27	No. 9 Texas	38–21	No. 10 Colorado
PEACH	Atlanta, GA	December 31	West Virginia	13–10	NC State

== Heisman Trophy voting ==
The Heisman Trophy is given to the year's most outstanding player

Player	School	Position	1st	2nd	3rd	Total
Archie Griffin	Ohio State	RB	454	167	104	1,800
Chuck Muncie	California	RB	145	104	87	730
Ricky Bell	USC	RB	70	169	160	708
Tony Dorsett	Pittsburgh	RB	66	149	120	616
Joe Washington	Oklahoma	RB	29	47	69	250
Jimmy DuBose	Florida	RB	19	13	29	112
John Sciarra	UCLA	QB	12	15	20	86
Gordon Bell	Michigan	RB	2	27	24	84
Lee Roy Selmon	Oklahoma	DT	7	22	14	79
Gene Swick	Toledo	QB	5	19	20	73

== See also ==
- 1975 NCAA Division I football rankings
- 1975 College Football All-America Team
- 1975 NCAA Division II football season
- 1975 NCAA Division III football season
