= 1975 California Golden Bears football team =

American college football season

1975 California Golden Bears football

Pac-8 co-champion
- Conference: Pacific-8 Conference

Ranking
- Coaches: No. 15
- AP: No. 14
- Record: 8–3 (6–1 Pac-8)
- Head coach: Mike White (4th season)
- Offensive coordinator: Roger Theder
- Captains: Chuck Muncie; Paul Von der Mehden
- Home stadium: California Memorial Stadium

1975 Pacific-8 Conference football standings
	Conf.					Overall
Team	W		L		T	W		L		T
No. 5 UCLA ^ +	6	–	1	–	0	9	–	2	–	1
No. 14 California +	6	–	1	–	0	8	–	3	–	0
Stanford	5	–	2	–	0	6	–	4	–	1
Washington	5	–	2	–	0	6	–	5	–	0
No. 17 USC	3	–	4	–	0	8	–	4	–	0
Oregon	2	–	5	–	0	3	–	8	–	0
Oregon State	1	–	6	–	0	1	–	10	–	0
Washington State	0	–	7	–	0	3	–	8	–	0
+ – Conference co-champions; ^ – Selected as Rose Bowl representative; Rankings from AP Poll

The 1975 California Golden Bears football team was an American football team that represented the University of California, Berkeley in the Pacific-8 Conference (Pac-8) during the 1975 NCAA Division I football season. In their fourth year under head coach Mike White, the Golden Bears compiled an 8–3 record (6–1 in Pac-8), finished in a tie with UCLA for the Pac-8 championship, and outscored their opponents 330 to 233. The Golden Bears gained 2,522 passing yards and 2,522 rushing yards. The average was 229 total yards per game and the team was ranked number one in total offense.

The team did not participate in the Rose Bowl because during the season it lost to co-champion UCLA. In the first year that the Pac-8 allowed additional bowl games, only fifth-place USC was invited, to the Liberty Bowl.

The team's statistical leaders included Joe Roth with 1,880 passing yards, Chuck Muncie with 1,460 rushing yards, and Steve Rivera with 790 receiving yards. Roth, a junior college transfer, became the starting quarterback in the season's fourth game, taking over from junior Fred Besana.

== Schedule ==
Date	Opponent	Rank	Site	Result	Attendance	Source
September 13	at Colorado*		Folsom Field; Boulder, CO	L 27–34	46,211	
September 20	No. 20 West Virginia*		California Memorial Stadium; Berkeley, CA	L 10–28	23,375	
September 27	at Washington State		Martin Stadium; Pullman, WA	W 33–21	24,500	
October 4	San Jose State*		California Memorial Stadium; Berkeley, CA	W 27–24	32,788	
October 11	at Oregon		Autzen Stadium; Eugene, OR	W 34–7	18,500	
October 18	Oregon State		California Memorial Stadium; Berkeley, CA	W 51–24	31,758	
October 25	at No. 19 UCLA		Los Angeles Memorial Coliseum; Los Angeles, CA (rivalry)	L 14–28	36,100	
November 1	No. 4 USC		California Memorial Stadium; Berkeley, CA	W 28–14	58,871	
November 8	Washington	No. 18	California Memorial Stadium; Berkeley, CA	W 27–24	43,270	
November 15	at Air Force*	No. 15	Falcon Stadium; Colorado Springs, CO	W 31–14	35,770	
November 22	at Stanford	No. 13	Stanford Stadium; Stanford, CA (Big Game)	W 48–15	88,000	
*Non-conference game; Rankings from AP Poll released prior to the game

== Roster ==
1975 California Golden Bears football team roster
Players
Coaches
Offense

Pos.	#	Name	Class
OT	79	Ted Albrecht	Jr
QB	11	Fred Besana	Jr
RB	42	Chuck Muncie	Sr
WR	7	Steve Rivera	Sr
QB	12	Joe Roth	Jr
WR	99	Wesley Walker	Jr

Defense

Pos.	#	Name	Class
LB		James Reed	Jr

Special teams

Pos.	#	Name	Class
K	3	Jim Breech	So
P	25	Greg Cummins	So

Head coach

- Mike White (4th year)

Coordinators/assistant coaches

Legend

- (C) Team captain
- (S) Suspended
- (I) Ineligible
- Injured
- Redshirt

== Game summaries ==
=== Stanford ===
Quarter	1	2	3	4	Total
California	14	13	0	21	48
Stanford	6	0	0	9	15

at Memorial Stadium, Berkeley, California

- Date: November 22
- Game attendance: 88,000

Scoring summary

Quarter	Time	Drive			Team	Scoring information	Score	
Quarter	Time	Plays	Yards	TOP	Team	Scoring information	California	Stanford
1					California	Chuck Muncie 7-yard touchdown reception from Joe Roth, Jim Breech kick good	7	0
1					California	Chuck Muncie 14-yard touchdown run, Jim Breech kick good	14	0
1					Stanford	Tony Hill 38-yard touchdown reception from Guy Benjamin, kick no good	14	6
2					California	48-yard field goal by Jim Breech	17	6
2					California	Chuck Muncie 1-yard touchdown run, Jim Breech kick good	24	6
2					California	38-yard field goal by Jim Breech	27	6
4					Stanford	Safety	27	8
4					Stanford	Jenke 4-yard touchdown reception from Guy Benjamin, Langford kick good	27	15
4					California	Chuck Muncie 3-yard touchdown run, Jim Breech kick good	34	15
4					California	Walker 46-yard touchdown reception from Chuck Muncie, Jim Breech kick good	41	15
4					California	Jones 6-yard touchdown run, Jim Breech kick good	48	15
"TOP" = time of possession. For other American football terms, see Glossary of American football.							48	15

Cal needed a win and UCLA tie or loss to earn a berth in the Rose Bowl.

Chuck Muncie finished with over 3,000 yards rushing in his career along with 37 touchdowns, 230 points and 4,188 all-purpose yards. By scoring four times, Muncie also tied a single game school record and finished the year with 15 TDs for another Cal mark.

After the game, coach Mike White said "If Chuck Muncie isn't the Heisman Trophy winner, I don't know who is."

== NFL draft ==
Two Golden Bears were selected in the 1976 NFL draft.

Player	Position	Round	Pick	NFL club
Chuck Muncie	Running back	1	3	New Orleans Saints
Steve Rivera	Wide receiver	4	100	San Francisco 49ers
