= Raymond Burks =

American football player (born 1955)

No. 59
- Position: Linebacker

Personal information
- Born: March 9, 1955 (age 71); Gardena, California, U.S.
- Listed height: 6 ft 3 in (1.91 m)
- Listed weight: 217 lb (98 kg)

Career information
- High school: Gardena
- College: UCLA
- NFL draft: 1977: 12th round, 318th overall pick

Career history
- Kansas City Chiefs (1977); New Orleans Saints (1979)*; Toronto Argonauts (1980)*
- * Offseason or practice squad member only

Awards and highlights
- Second-team All-Pac-8 (1976)
- Stats at Pro Football Reference

Raymond Charles Burks Jr. (born March 9, 1955) is an American former professional football linebacker who played for the Kansas City Chiefs of the National Football League (NFL). He played college football for the UCLA Bruins and was selected by the Chiefs in the 12th round of the 1977 NFL draft.

== Early life ==
Raymond Charles Burks Jr. was born on March 9, 1955, in Gardena, California. He attended Gardena High School in Gardena, California.

== College career ==
Burks enrolled at the University of California, Los Angeles to play college football for the Bruins. He was a four-year letterman from 1973 to 1976. He was a wide receiver in 1973, catching nine passes for 271 yards and three touchdowns. Burks' 30.1 yards-per-reception is still a single-season school record as of 2016. His three touchdown catches were also the most ever by a UCLA true freshman until Thomas Duarte tied him in 2013. Burks converted to tight end in 1974 and recorded four receptions for 75 yards. He was a linebacker from 1975 to 1976. His 21-tackle game against USC in 1976 was the second-most in school history at the time. Burks finished the 1976 season with 107 tackles overall and a 28-yard interception return touchdown, earning Coaches second-team All-Pacific-8 Conference honors. At the conclusion of his college career, he played in both the 1977 Hula Bowl and 1977 Japan Bowl.

== Professional career ==
Burks was selected by the Kansas City Chiefs in the 12th round, with the 318th overall pick, of the 1977 NFL draft as a linebacker. He played in 13 games for the Chiefs during the 1977 season as a reserve linebacker. He also returned one kick for 15 yards and recovered a fumble. On November 20, 1977, in a 14–7 loss to the Denver Broncos, Burks ran for 51 yards on a fake punt, a play the Chiefs dubbed the "Boomeruski". He was released on August 22, 1978, after the third of four preseason games.

Burks signed with the New Orleans Saints on March 2, 1979. He was released on August 13, 1979, after the second game of the 1979 preseason.

Burks was signed by the Toronto Argonauts of the Canadian Football League in May 1980. He was released on July 5, 1980, before the start of the regular season.
