= Al Burleson =

American gridiron football player (born 1954)

Profile
- Position: Defensive back

Personal information
- Born: September 25, 1954 (age 72); San Francisco, California, U.S.
- Listed height: 6 ft 2 in (1.88 m)
- Listed weight: 180 lb (82 kg)

Career information
- College: Washington
- NFL draft: 1976: 14th round, 400th overall pick

Career history
- 1976–1981: Calgary Stampeders
- 1983: Los Angeles Express

Awards and highlights
- CFL All-Star (1979); 2× CFL West All-Star (1978, 1979); First-team All-Pac-8 (1975); Washington MVP (1975)

Alvin Burleson (born September 25, 1954) is an American former football player. He played professionally in the Canadian Football League (CFL) for the Calgary Stampeders, from 1976 to 1981, and in the United States Football League (USFL) for the Los Angeles Express, in 1983. Burleson is the father of four sons, including National Football League (NFL) wide receiver Nate Burleson and National Basketball Association (NBA) guard Kevin Burleson.

== College career ==
Burleson played at the University of Washington, where he lettered from 1973 to 1975, finishing as a captain of the 1975 team.

He was named to the 1975 All-Pacific-8 Conference football team and received honorable mention by the AP and UPI All-America teams. Following the season, Burleson participated in the 1976 Japan Bowl and Hula Bowl.

As of 2016, he remains among the school's all-time leader in tackles (records kept since 1967), holds the season record for interception return yardage at 149 set in 1975, career record for interceptions returned for touchdowns, and holds the longest interception return at 93 yards which was set in the 1975 Apple Cup.

== Professional career ==
Burleson played for the Calgary Stampeders from 1976 to 1981 and was a 1979 CFL All-Star. In 1983, he was a member of the Los Angeles Express.

== Coaching ==
Burleson was a coach of the West Seattle Warhawks football team.

== See also ==
- Washington Huskies football statistical leaders
