= Dick Vermeil =

American football coach (born 1936)

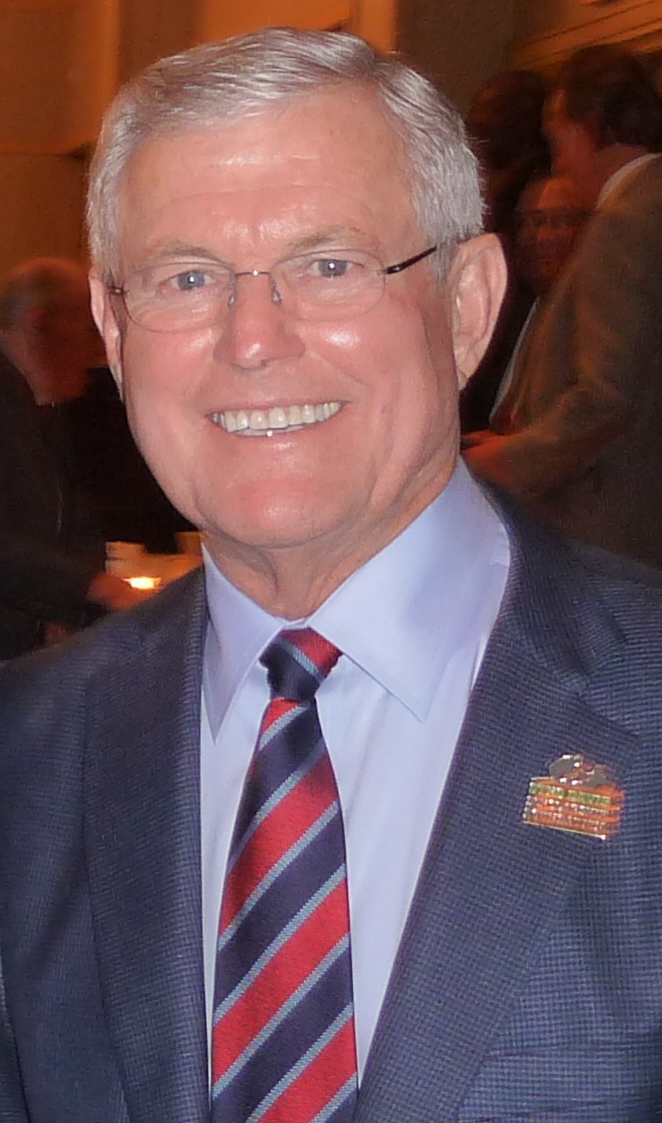
- Vermeil in 2010

Personal information
- Born: October 30, 1936 (age 90); Calistoga, California, U.S.

Career information
- High school: Calistoga
- College: San Jose State

Career history
- Del Mar HS (1959) Assistant coach; Hillsdale HS (1960–1962) Head coach; San Mateo (1963) Backfield coach; Napa (1964) Head coach; Stanford (1965–1968) Assistant coach; Los Angeles Rams (1969) Special teams coach; UCLA (1970) Offensive coordinator; Los Angeles Rams (1971–1972) Quarterbacks coach; Los Angeles Rams (1973) Quarterbacks & special teams coach; UCLA (1974–1975) Head coach; Philadelphia Eagles (1976–1982) Head coach; St. Louis Rams (1997–1999) Head coach, General manager & President of Football Operations; Kansas City Chiefs (2001–2005) Head coach

Awards and highlights
- Super Bowl champion (XXXIV); The Sporting News Sportsman of the Year (2003) (Note: Shared with Jack McKeon.); AP NFL Coach of the Year (1999); 2× Pro Football Weekly NFL Coach of the Year (1979, 1999); 2× The Sporting News NFL Coach of the Year (1979, 1999); 2× Greasy Neale Award (1999, 2003); UPI NFC Coach of the Year (1978); Philadelphia Eagles Hall of Fame; St. Louis Football Ring of Fame; Pacific-8 Coach of the Year (1975); Pacific-8 Conference Championship (1975); Rose Bowl Championship (1975)

Head coaching record
- Regular season: 120–109 (.524) (NFL); 22–7–3 (.734) (college)
- Postseason: 6–5 (.545)
- Career: 126–114 (.525)
- Coaching profile at Pro Football Reference
- Executive profile at Pro Football Reference
- Pro Football Hall of Fame

Richard Albert Vermeil (/vərˈmiːl/ vər-MEEL; born October 30, 1936) is an American former football coach who served as a head coach in the National Football League (NFL) for 15 seasons. He was the head coach of the Philadelphia Eagles for seven seasons, the St. Louis Rams for three, and the Kansas City Chiefs for five. Prior to the NFL, he was the head football coach at Hillsdale High School from 1960 to 1962, Napa Junior College in 1964, and UCLA from 1974 to 1975. With UCLA, Vermeil led the team to victory in the 1976 Rose Bowl. Vermeil's NFL tenure would see him improve the fortunes of teams that had a losing record before he arrived and bring them all to the playoffs by his third season, which included a Super Bowl title with the Rams.

Becoming Philadelphia's head coach in 1976, Vermeil took over for a team that had not qualified for the postseason, won a playoff game, or clinched their division since 1960. He ended each of these droughts between 1978 and 1980 en route to the Eagles' first Super Bowl appearance in Super Bowl XV. Retiring after the 1982 season, Vermeil spent 15 years away from the NFL until he returned in 1997 with the Rams, who had not achieved a winning season or playoff berth since 1989. Vermeil again ended these droughts during the 1999 season, also obtaining the Rams' first winning season in St. Louis. The season culminated with the Rams winning Super Bowl XXXIV, which was their first Super Bowl victory, their first championship since 1951, and their only NFL title in St. Louis. Vermeil retired a second time following the Super Bowl, but returned with the Chiefs in 2001. During the 2003 season, he guided the Chiefs to their first division title and postseason berth since 1997, although he did not win any playoff games.

Vermeil holds the distinction of being named Coach of the Year on the high school, junior college, collegiate, and professional levels. He was the Pacific-8 Coach of the Year during UCLA's 1975 championship season, also becoming the first to receive the honor, and the NFL Coach of the Year during the Rams' 1999 championship season. Vermeil was inducted to the Pro Football Hall of Fame in 2022.

== Early life and college ==
Vermeil was born in Calistoga, California, one of four children. He worked at his father's auto repair shop as a teenager and played at quarterback on the Calistoga High School football team. After graduating from Calistoga High in 1954, Vermeil enrolled at Napa Junior College (now Napa Valley College). He transferred to San Jose State College (now University) after two years at Napa. After one year as a backup quarterback on the 1956 San Jose State Spartans football team, Vermeil became starting quarterback on the 1957 team, throwing for 580 yards, one touchdown, and nine interceptions on a team that finished 3–7.

Vermeil completed a bachelor's degree in 1958 and master's degree in 1959 at San Jose State, both in physical education.

== Coaching career ==
=== Early coaching career (1959–1973) ===
Vermeil began his football coaching career as assistant coach for Del Mar High School in San Jose in 1959. Then from 1960 to 1962, he was head coach at Hillsdale High School in San Mateo. Moving up to the junior college level, he was defensive backfield coach at the College of San Mateo in 1963.

In his first head coaching position, Vermeil returned to Napa Junior College in 1964, leading the Chiefs to a 7–2 record, best in the school history. While at Napa JC his younger brother Al played for him. From 1965 to 1968, Vermeil was an assistant coach at Stanford under John Ralston.

Vermeil shares the distinction of being hired as one of the NFL's first special teams coaches with Hall of Fame Coach Marv Levy. Vermeil was hired by George Allen's Los Angeles Rams in 1969 the same year Levy was hired by Jerry Williams, then head coach of the Philadelphia Eagles. Except for 1970, when Vermeil was an assistant coach with UCLA, he remained with the Rams until 1974 when he was named as head coach by UCLA.

=== UCLA (1974–1975) ===
As the head coach for the UCLA Bruins, Vermeil compiled a 15–5–3 record in two seasons (1974–75), including a 9–2–1 record in 1975 when he led the Bruins to their first conference championship in 10 years, and a win in the Rose Bowl over an undefeated and number 1 ranked Ohio State team. He was inducted into the Rose Bowl Hall of Fame as a member of the Class of 2014.

=== Philadelphia Eagles (1976–1982) ===
Vermeil began his NFL head coaching career in 1976 with the Philadelphia Eagles, taking over after the team went 4–10 the previous year. Due to past trades by the Eagles, Vermeil's teams did not have a first-round draft pick until 1979.

After suffering through two losing seasons under Vermeil, the Eagles made the playoffs for the first time in 18 seasons in 1978. That 1978 season featured breakthrough years by NFL stars Ron Jaworski, Wilbert Montgomery, and one of the greatest games in Eagles history—the seminal Miracle at the Meadowlands. The Eagles were losing to the New York Giants with seconds to play but when the Giants fumbled the ball, Eagles' cornerback Herman Edwards recovered it and ran it back for a touchdown and a miraculous 19–17 victory. In the 1979 season, Vermeil's Eagles went 11–5 and won their first playoff game since the 1960 NFL Championship Game.

In the 1980 season, Vermeil led the Eagles to Super Bowl XV after defeating the Dallas Cowboys for the NFC championship. The Eagles lost the Super Bowl to Oakland, 27–10. Philadelphia recorded a 10–6 record in 1981, but was eliminated in the first round of the playoffs by a 9–7 New York Giants team that was playing with their starting quarterback (Phil Simms) and middle linebacker (Brad Van Pelt) out with injuries. After the Eagles ended the 1982 season with a dismal 3–6 record in a 9-game season shortened by a players' strike, Vermeil retired for the first time on January 10, 1983, citing occupational burnout.

Vermeil's time with the Eagles is featured in the 2006 movie Invincible in which the movie depicts open tryouts and how 30-year Philadelphia native Vince Papale made the team. In actuality, Vermeil had seen tape of Papale playing semi-pro ball in Philadelphia and invited him to a workout and a subsequent tryout.

=== Hiatus from coaching (1983–1996) ===
For the next 15 years, Vermeil spent time working as a sports announcer for CBS and ABC. Following the 1994 season, the Eagles fired Rich Kotite and owner Jeffrey Lurie inquired about bringing back Vermeil as coach. However, the Eagles and Vermeil could not come to a contractual agreement. The Eagles eventually hired Ray Rhodes to be their head coach. Vermeil issued a statement saying, "I'm not going to beg Jeffrey Lurie to coach this football team."

=== St. Louis Rams (1997–1999) ===
Vermeil returned to coaching with the St. Louis Rams in 1997. His first two years with the Rams were abysmal: the Rams won 5 and lost 11 games in 1997, and the following season they went 4–12. The 1999 season looked to start just as badly, when new starting quarterback Trent Green was injured in the pre-season. However, Green's injury allowed then-unknown Kurt Warner to start. Under Warner, the Rams offense exploded, and they finished the 1999 season with a record of 13–3 in one of the biggest single-year turnarounds in NFL history, ushering in the era of what would become known as "The Greatest Show on Turf". Vermeil led the Rams to their first Super Bowl victory in Super Bowl XXXIV with a 23–16 win over the Tennessee Titans. He was also named NFL Coach of the Year for the second time for the 1999 season. He walked away from coaching again after the Rams' Super Bowl victory. Years later, Vermeil regretted leaving the Rams saying that was "one of the worst decisions I ever made."

=== Kansas City Chiefs (2001–2005) ===
Vermeil signed with the Kansas City Chiefs on January 12, 2001, despite his retirement following the Super Bowl win with the Rams. His first season with the Chiefs was substandard, finishing with a 6–10 record, their worst record since 1988. Vermeil and the Chiefs made some major changes for the 2002 season, where the Chiefs improved to 8–8. The Chiefs had the NFL's best offense in 2002, led by Priest Holmes, Trent Green, Tony Gonzalez, Dante Hall, and offensive linemen Willie Roaf and Will Shields. In 2003 the Chiefs started the season 9–0 and finished with a 13–3 record, making the playoffs and winning the AFC West. They also had the NFL's top ranked offense for the second straight year. The Chiefs went 7–9 in 2004, even though they had the NFL's top-ranked offense for the third consecutive year under offensive coordinator Al Saunders. The Chiefs performed poorly due to their soft defense, which was ranked 31st out of 32 teams in the league.

Vermeil returned with the Chiefs for the 2005 season with one of the NFL's best offenses, and an improved defense. In 2005 Vermeil and Saunders uncharacteristically included more high-risk calls. Pro Bowl running back and team leader Priest Holmes suffered a season-ending injury against the San Diego Chargers in the eighth week of the season. However, his injury allowed the emerging Larry Johnson to start in his place. Under Johnson, the Chiefs' offense continued at its usual explosive pace. On December 31, Vermeil announced that he would retire at the conclusion of the 2005 season, and the next day he led the Chiefs to a 37–3 rout over the Cincinnati Bengals. However, the Chiefs failed to make the playoffs, despite their 10–6 record.

== Post-coaching career and legacy ==
Vermeil is remembered for his frequent emotional breakdowns during press conferences, including crying when getting emotional. This display of emotion has helped make him a popular coach among fans. Vermeil lives in the historic Country Club Plaza district of Kansas City. When not in Kansas City, the entire Vermeil family enjoys spending time and working on "The Ranch", a 114-acre (0.46 km^{2}) homestead located outside Philadelphia in rural Chester County, Pennsylvania. He is also a huge supporter of the Chester County Council Boy Scouts of America and is a recipient of the Silver Beaver Award, which was coincidentally awarded at the same time he was named head coach of the Chiefs in 2001. His annual golf invitational has brought in over US$1 million to the council's operational fund.

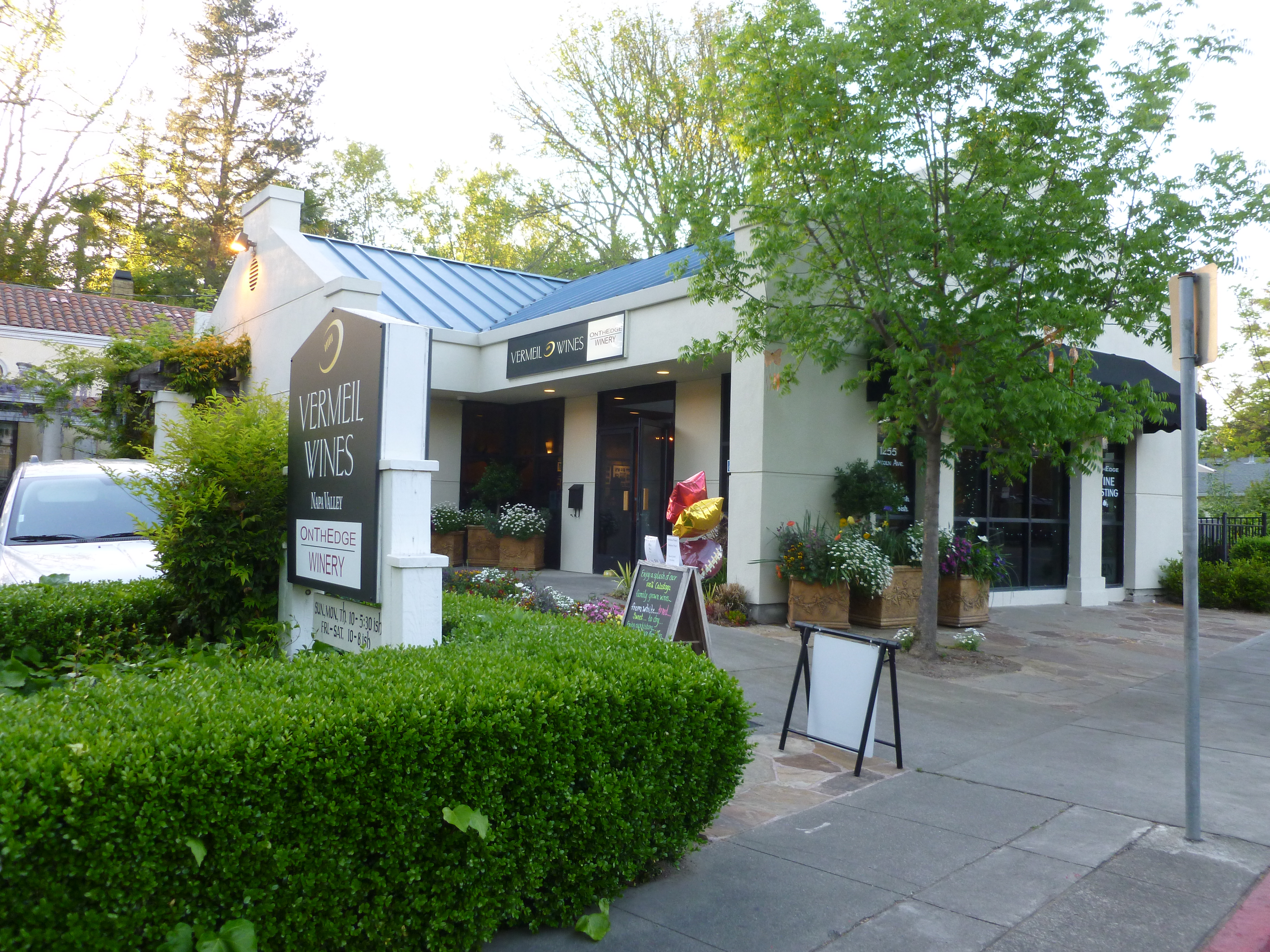
Vermeil Wines/On The Edge Winery in Calistoga, California

Vermeil partnered with OnTheEdge Winery and produced his own self-proclaimed "Garage Cabernet" wine, named in honor of his father, Jean Louis Vermeil. Vermeil was actually once reprimanded by the NFL when during a game he promised kicker Morten Andersen a bottle of Cabernet Sauvignon if he could kick the game-winning field goal versus Oakland. Andersen made the kick, but upon hearing about the offer, the NFL reminded Vermeil and the Chiefs that the $500 bottle of wine was considered a performance-based incentive bonus not written into Andersen's contract, and the gift was disallowed.

Vermeil and former Redskins head coach Joe Gibbs are close friends. It was under Vermeil's recommendation that Gibbs hired Vermeil's former offensive coordinator and 2005 USA Today's Offensive Coach of the Year Al Saunders as a top assistant coach.

Vermeil has been portrayed in several films. The 2006 film, Invincible, showed Vermeil (played by Greg Kinnear) when he was head coach of Philadelphia and gave Vince Papale an opportunity to play for the Eagles. In the 2021 film American Underdog, Vermeil is portrayed by Dennis Quaid when he gave Kurt Warner an opportunity to play for the St. Louis Rams. Vermeil is known for his exceptional judge of character capabilities and decisions to give chances to underdogs.

During his first retirement, Vermeil worked as a game analyst for both CBS (1983–87) and ABC Sports (1988–96), most of the time paired with Brent Musburger. Currently, Vermeil works as a game analyst on broadcasts of college football and NFL games on NFL Network, with work during the 2006 Insight Bowl. Vermeil also served as head coach in the 2012 and 2013 editions of the NFLPA Collegiate Bowl.

A Coors Light commercial featuring manipulated archival footage of Vermeil at a press conference debuted in 2006.

On November 2, 2008, Vermeil was honored by the St. Louis Rams organization with the placing of his name on the "Ring of Honor" around the inside of the Edward Jones Dome in St. Louis.

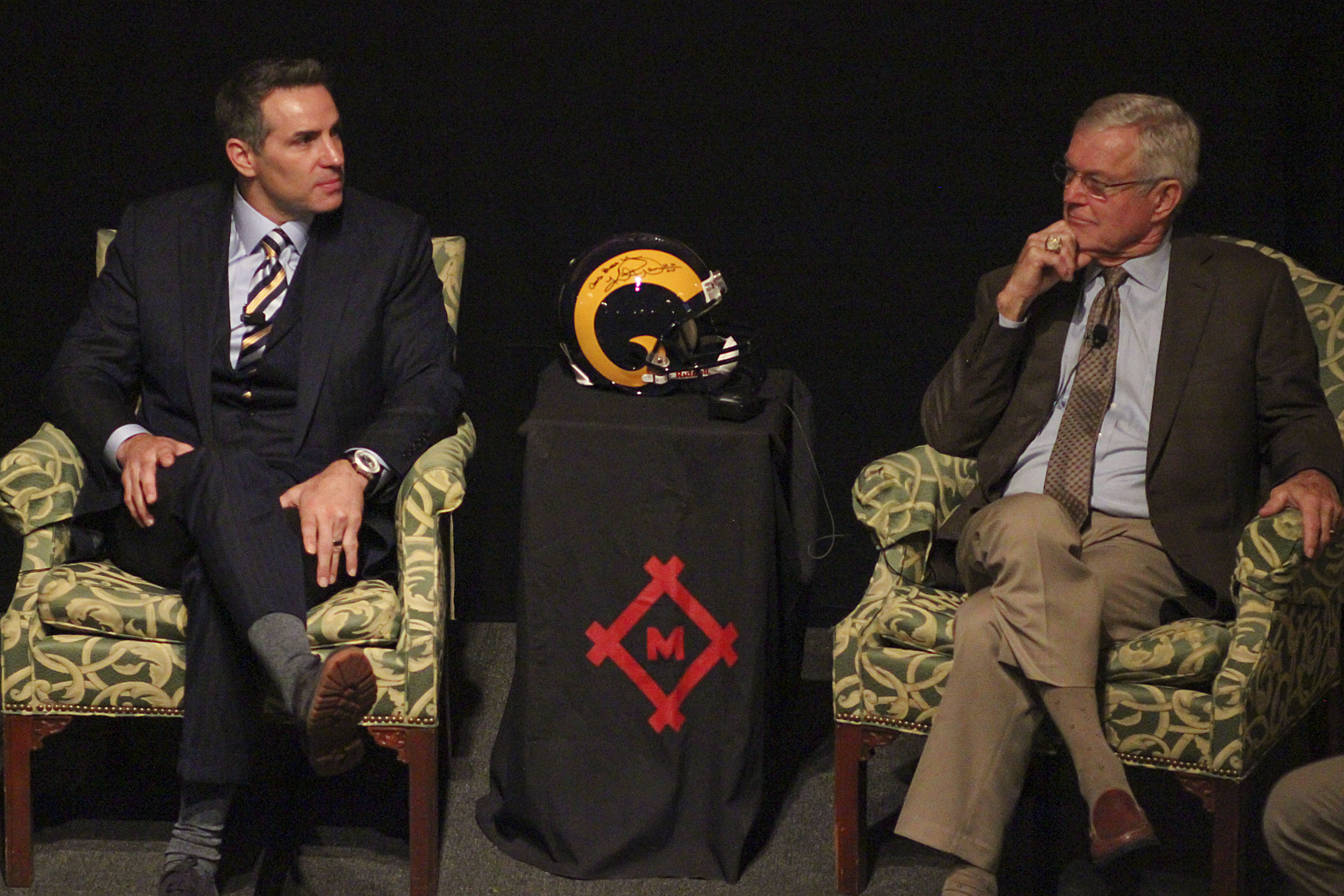
Vermeil (right) along with Kurt Warner, 2014.

Vermeil had a short cameo in the 2011 film The Greening of Whitney Brown, set in Chester County, in which he plays a football coach for the local middle school.

The 2001 book autobiography Touched: The Jerry Sandusky Story (ISBN 9781582612706) includes a quote in a foreword from Vermeil: "He could very well be the Will Rogers of the coaching profession." In 2011 former Penn State defensive coach Sandusky was arrested on 40 counts of child sexual abuse. A 2011 account about the book said "Sandusky paints a picture of himself as someone who would consistently take risks in pursuit of what he often refers to as 'mischief'" and there are many other citations and quotes which look "different in light of the horrendous allegations". After the firing of PSU president Graham B. Spanier, it was reported that Vermeil on November 8, 2011, "told [Philadelphia] Action News, 'I don't think there's anything that could discolor the quality of Joe Paterno's legacy.'" Vermeil also served on the Honorary Board of Sandusky's Second Mile children's foundation, along with Philadelphia Eagles coach Andy Reid, Matt Millen from ESPN, actor Mark Wahlberg and football player Franco Harris, among others. It was reported on November 11, 2011, that Vermeil hadn't "spoken to [Sandusky] since the scandal broke. 'It's a blindside,' Vermeil said. 'That's all I can say.' 'If it's true, he's a sick man. He had an illness none of us knew about. That's all.' "

The Broadcast Pioneers of Philadelphia named Vermeil their Person of the Year in 1985 and inducted him into their Hall of Fame in 2003.

Vermeil served as head coach for the National Team in the NFLPA Collegiate Bowl from 2012 to 2014, leading his team to victory in each of his three appearances.

In August 2015, Vermeil bought a 2.5% share of the Philadelphia Soul arena football team. With Vermeil owning a minority stake of the team, the Philadelphia Soul won ArenaBowl XXIX in 2016 & ArenaBowl XXX in 2017.

In 2020, he was named coaching finalist for the Pro Football Hall of Fame's "Centennial Slate." He was again up for the class of 2021, but was among the coaches part of the final cut. He was chosen as the coaching finalist for the class of 2022.

In 2022, Vermeil was elected into the Pro Football Hall of Fame.

For many years after his retirement from the Philadelphia Eagles, Vermeil represented the Philadelphia area Cadillac dealers, as well as for the Philadelphia chapter of Blue Cross Blue Shield, in several radio and television commercials.

== Head coaching record ==
=== Junior college ===
Year	Team	Overall	Conference	Standing	Bowl/playoffs
Napa Chiefs (Golden Valley Conference) (1964)
1964	Napa	7–2	4–1	2nd	
Napa:		7–2	4–1		
Total:		7–2			

=== College ===
Year	Team	Overall	Conference	Standing	Bowl/playoffs	Coaches^{#}	AP^{°}
UCLA Bruins (Pacific-8 Conference) (1974–1975)
1974	UCLA	6–3–2	4–2–1	T–3rd			
1975	UCLA	9–2–1	6–1	T–1st	W Rose	5	5
UCLA:		15–5–3	10–3–1				
Total:		15–5–3					
National championship Conference title Conference division title or championship game berth
^{#}Rankings from final Coaches Poll.; ^{°}Rankings from final AP Poll.

=== NFL ===
Team	Year	Regular season					Postseason			
Team	Year	Won	Lost	Ties	Win %	Finish	Won	Lost	Win %	Result
PHI	1976	4	10	0	.286	4th in NFC East	-	-	-	-
PHI	1977	5	9	0	.357	4th in NFC East	-	-	-	-
PHI	1978	9	7	0	.563	2nd in NFC East	0	1	.000	Lost to Atlanta Falcons in NFC Wild Card Game
PHI	1979	11	5	0	.688	2nd in NFC East	1	1	.500	Lost to Tampa Bay Buccaneers in NFC Divisional Game
PHI	1980	12	4	0	.750	1st in NFC East	2	1	.667	Lost to Oakland Raiders in Super Bowl XV
PHI	1981	10	6	0	.625	2nd in NFC East	0	1	.000	Lost to New York Giants in NFC Wild Card Game
PHI	1982	3	6	0	.333	13th in NFC	-	-	-	-
PHI Total		54	47	0	.535		3	4	.429	
STL	1997	5	11	0	.313	5th in NFC West	-	-	-	-
STL	1998	4	12	0	.250	5th in NFC West	-	-	-	-
STL	1999	13	3	0	.813	1st in NFC West	3	0	1.000	Super Bowl XXXIV champions
STL Total		22	26	0	.458		3	0	1.000	
KC	2001	6	10	0	.375	4th in AFC West	-	-	-	-
KC	2002	8	8	0	.500	4th in AFC West	-	-	-	-
KC	2003	13	3	0	.813	1st in AFC West	0	1	.000	Lost to Indianapolis Colts in AFC Divisional Game
KC	2004	7	9	0	.438	3rd in AFC West	-	-	-	-
KC	2005	10	6	0	.625	2nd in AFC West	-	-	-	-
KC Total		44	36	0	.550		0	1	.000	
Total		120	109	0	.524		6	5	.545	

== Personal life ==
Vermeil and his wife, Carol, have three children and 11 grandchildren. Vermeil's nephew, Louie Giammona, played in the NFL for Vermeil with the Philadelphia Eagles. Giammona also played for the New York Jets.

After John Madden passed on December 28, 2021, Vermeil became the oldest living coach of a Super Bowl winning team. Following the passing of former Vikings Hall of Fame coach Bud Grant on March 11, 2023, Vermeil and Super Bowl XV counterpart Tom Flores share the title for the earliest Super Bowl coached by a living coach; they are the only living coaches from any of the first 16 Super Bowls.

Following the March 4, 2026 death of Lou Holtz, who coached the New York Jets in 1976, Vermeil is the last living coach from that season or any prior season. He and Leeman Bennett, hired by the Atlanta Falcons in 1977, are the last living coaches from the NFL's 14-game regular season era (1961-1977).

== See also ==
- List of celebrities who own wineries and vineyards
- List of National Football League head coaches with 50 wins
- List of teachers portrayed in films
