= 1975 Washington Huskies football team =

American college football season

1975 Washington Huskies football
- Conference: Pacific-8 Conference
- Record: 6–5 (5–2 Pac-8)
- Head coach: Don James (1st season)
- Offensive coordinator: Dick Scesniak (1st season)
- Defensive coordinator: Jim E. Mora (1st season)
- MVP: Al Burleson
- Captains: Ray Pinney; John Whitacre; Dan Lloyd; Al Burleson
- Home stadium: Husky Stadium

1975 Pacific-8 Conference football standings
	Conf.					Overall
Team	W		L		T	W		L		T
No. 5 UCLA ^ +	6	–	1	–	0	9	–	2	–	1
No. 14 California +	6	–	1	–	0	8	–	3	–	0
Stanford	5	–	2	–	0	6	–	4	–	1
Washington	5	–	2	–	0	6	–	5	–	0
No. 17 USC	3	–	4	–	0	8	–	4	–	0
Oregon	2	–	5	–	0	3	–	8	–	0
Oregon State	1	–	6	–	0	1	–	10	–	0
Washington State	0	–	7	–	0	3	–	8	–	0
+ – Conference co-champions; ^ – Selected as Rose Bowl representative; Rankings from AP Poll

The 1975 Washington Huskies football team represented the University of Washington in the 1975 NCAA Division I football season as a member of the Pacific-8 Conference (Pac-8). The Huskies were led by head coach Don James in his first year, and played their home games at Husky Stadium in Seattle. They finished season at 6–5 overall (5–2 in the Pac-8, tied for third).

Hired in December 1974, James was previously the head coach for four years at Kent State.

== Schedule ==
Date	Opponent	Site	Result	Attendance	Source
September 13	at Arizona State*	Sun Devil Stadium; Tempe, AZ	L 12–35	50,194	
September 20	No. 8 Texas*	Husky Stadium; Seattle, WA	L 10–28	56,000	
September 27	Navy*	Husky Stadium; Seattle, WA	W 14–13	53,000	
October 4	at Oregon	Autzen Stadium; Eugene, OR (rivalry)	W 27–17	28,500	
October 11	at No. 7 Alabama*	Bryant–Denny Stadium; Tuscaloosa, AL	L 0–52	58,000	
October 18	Stanford	Husky Stadium; Seattle, WA	L 21–24	45,000	
October 25	Oregon State	Husky Stadium; Seattle, WA	W 35–7	43,500	
November 1	at No. 13 UCLA	Los Angeles Memorial Coliseum; Los Angeles, CA	W 17–13	29,158	
November 8	at No. 18 California	California Memorial Stadium; Berkeley, CA	L 24–27	43,270	
November 15	No. 13 USC	Husky Stadium; Seattle, WA	W 8–7	53,700	
November 22	Washington State	Husky Stadium; Seattle, WA (Apple Cup)	W 28–27	57,100	
*Non-conference game; Rankings from AP Poll released prior to the game

== Preseason ==
Coming off a 5–6 season in 1974 under Jim Owens, James inherited a veteran squad with most of the talent on the defensive side of the ball, and they would be relied upon as the offense adjusted to running primarily from the I-formation. Fullback Robin Earl, who switched from tight end after four games last season, and center Ray Pinney were the foundation for the change occurring on that side of the ball.

== Game summaries ==
=== Washington State ===
Washington State Cougars at Washington Huskies

Quarter	1	2	3	4	Total
Washington St	10	14	3	0	27
Washington	7	7	0	14	28

at Husky Stadium • Seattle, Washington

- Date: November 22
- Game time: 1:30 pm PST
- Game weather: Rain • 50 °F (10 °C)
- Game attendance: 57,100

Game information

Washington St

Washington

- Warren Moon
  4/22, 126 yards, 2 TD
- Robin Earl
  9 rush, 51 yds
- Spider Gaines
  2 rec, 107 yds, 2 TD

Trailing by thirteen points with three minutes remaining, defensive back Al Burleson returned an interception 93 yards for a touchdown and sophomore quarterback Warren Moon connected with Bob "Spider" Gaines for a 78-yard touchdown pass with less than a minute left to complete the comeback victory in the Apple Cup.

Washington State had dominated the second half and appeared on their way to another score when Burleson picked off John Hopkins and raced down the left sideline to the end zone with less than three minutes remaining.

Coach Don James was surprised by the Cougars electing to pass instead of playing for the field goal, saying "Had they made the field goal it would have put the nail in the coffin."

Following a three-and-out on Washington State's next possession, the Huskies started from their own 22. On the first play, Moon threw into coverage and the ball deflected off Leon Garrett and into the hands of teammate Gaines, who went 40 yards to score.

Until then, the Cougars had controlled the game thanks to fullback Vaughn Williams and tailback Dan Doornink, who appeared unstoppable against the Washington defense.

Washington's first score came on a quarterback sneak by Chris Rowland from the one for a 7-3 lead.

The Huskies scored again before halftime on a 29-yard pass from Moon to Gaines, who had primarily been used as a punt blocker to that point.

Moon had started the season as the starting quarterback, only to be replaced by Rowland after the offense struggled in the first few games.

Scoring summary

Quarter	Time	Drive			Team	Scoring information	Score	
Quarter	Time	Plays	Yards	TOP	Team	Scoring information	WSU	WASH
1					Washington St	40-yard field goal by Hedrick	3	0
1					Washington	Rowland 1-yard touchdown run, Robbins kick good	3	7
1					Washington St	Williams 3-yard touchdown run, Hedrick kick good	10	7
2					Washington St	Hopkins 1-yard touchdown run, Hedrick kick good	17	7
2					Washington St	Williams 1-yard touchdown run, Hedrick kick good	24	7
2					Washington	Gaines 29-yard touchdown reception from Moon, Robbins kick good	24	14
3					Washington St	36-yard field goal by Hedrick	27	14
4					Washington	Interception returned 93 yards for touchdown by Burleson, Robbins kick good	27	21
4					Washington	Gaines 78-yard touchdown reception from Moon, Robbins kick good	27	28
"TOP" = time of possession. For other American football terms, see Glossary of American football.							27	28

== Roster ==
1975 Washington Huskies football team roster
Players
Coaches
Offense

Pos.	#	Name	Class
TB, QB	15	James Anderson	Sr
TE	84	Gordy Bronson	Sr
C	58	Blair Bush	So
SE	82	Craig Davillier	Jr
FB	99	Robin Earl	Jr
SE	93	Spider Gaines	Fr
RB	32	Greg Martin	Fr
QB	12	Warren Moon	So
TE	97	Nelse Petermann	Sr
SE	91	Scott Phillips	So
C	59	Ray Pinney (C)	Sr
G	65	Eddie Ray	Sr
QB	13	Chris Rowland	Sr
G	63	Jeff Toews	Fr
OT	95	Don Wardlow	So
OT	74	John Whitacre (C)	Sr

Defense

Pos.	#	Name	Class
DB	18	Al Burleson (C)	Sr
DT	62	Bob Graves	Sr
MG	66	Charles Jackson	Jr
LB	5	Michael Jackson	Fr
DB	42	Roberto Jourdan	Sr
LB	50	Dan Lloyd (C)	Sr
DB	17	Ron Olson	Sr
DB	28	Frank Reed	Sr
LB	36	Dean Schlamp	Sr
LB	92	Paul Strohmeier	Sr
DT	94	Stan Walderhaug	So

Special teams

Pos.	#	Name	Class
P	3	Don Feleay	Jr
PK	7	Steve Robbins	So

Head coach

- Don James (1st year)

Coordinators/assistant coaches

- Dick Scesniak – (OC)
- Jim Mora – (DC)

Legend

- (C) Team captain
- (S) Suspended
- (I) Ineligible
- Injured
- Redshirt

== Statistics ==
=== Passing ===
Player	Att	Comp	Yards	TD	INT
Chris Rowland	45	117	597	4	6
Warren Moon	48	122	587	2	22

_{Moon played in eight games, started six}

=== Rushing ===
Player	Att	Yards	TD
Robin Earl	167	782	1

=== Receiving ===
Player	Rec	Yards	TD
Scott Phillips	33	433	1

== Awards ==
Al Burleson

- Honorable Mention All-American (AP, UPI)
- All-Pac-8
- Pac-8 Player of Week (vs. Navy, USC, Washington State)

Charles Jackson

- Pac-8 Player of Week (vs. Oregon)

Dan Lloyd

- All-Pac-8
- Pac-8 Player of Week (vs. UCLA)
- Guy Flaherty Award (most inspirational)

Ray Pinney

- Honorable Mention All-American (AP, UPI)
- All-Pac-8

== NFL draft selections ==
Seven University of Washington Huskies were selected in the 1976 NFL draft, which lasted 17 rounds with 487 selections.

= Husky Hall of Fame

Player	Position	Round	Pick	Franchise
Ray Pinney	Center	2nd	37	Pittsburgh Steelers
Dan Lloyd	Linebacker	6th	162	New York Giants
Frank Reed	Defensive back	8th	219	Atlanta Falcons
Paul Strohmeier	Linebacker	10th	272	Washington Redskins
Al Burleson	Defensive back	14th	400	Los Angeles Rams
Ron Olson	Defensive back	15th	414	Atlanta Falcons
Chris Rowland	Quarterback	17th	461	Seattle Seahawks
