= John Sciarra =

American gridiron football player (born 1954)

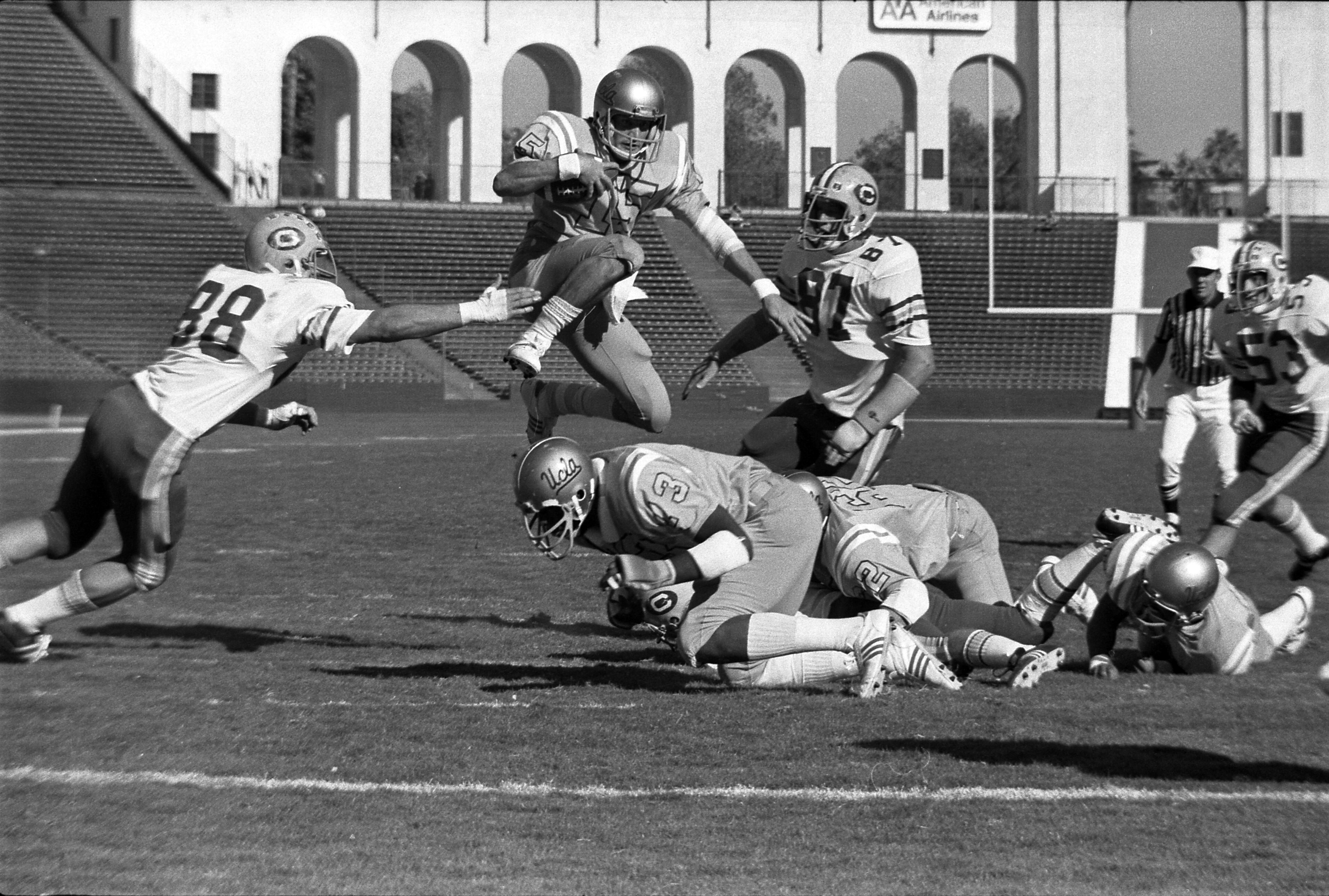
- Sciarra (with ball) during a game against Cal, 1975

No. 6, 21
- Position: Safety / Quarterback

Personal information
- Born: March 2, 1954 (age 72); Los Angeles, California, U.S.
- Listed height: 5 ft 11 in (1.80 m)
- Listed weight: 185 lb (84 kg)

Career information
- High school: Bishop Amat Memorial (La Puente, California)
- College: UCLA
- NFL draft: 1976: 4th round, 103 (By the Chicago Bears)th overall pick

Career history
- BC Lions (1976–1977); Philadelphia Eagles (1978–1983)

Awards and highlights
- CFL's Most Outstanding Rookie Award (1976); Jackie Parker Trophy (1976); Consensus All-American (1975); First-team All-Pac-8 (1975); Rose Bowl Hall of Fame (1991)

Career NFL statistics
- Interceptions: 4
- Fumble recoveries: 7
- Return yards: 909
- Stats at Pro Football Reference
- College Football Hall of Fame

John Michael Sciarra (born March 2, 1954) is an American former professional football player who was a safety in the National Football League (NFL) for the Philadelphia Eagles from 1978 to 1983. He also played receiver for the British Columbia Lions of the Canadian Football League (CFL). He played college football as a quarterback for the UCLA Bruins, earning consensus All-American honors in 1975.

== Early life ==
Sciarra was born in Los Angeles, CA the youngest of three children. His parents, Edith and John J Sciarra, raised John and his two older sisters in Alhambra, CA. John attended Bishop Amat Memorial High School in La Puente, California, where he was a National Honor Society student and starred in both football and baseball. He was named the CIF Southern Section Player of the Year for football in 1971. His maternal grandparents were Italian immigrants.

== College career ==
After graduating from high school, Sciarra was heavily recruited by major college football and baseball programs, and was also drafted in the 3rd round by the Cleveland Indians to play professional baseball. Ultimately, he chose to attend UCLA where he graduated cum laude in 1976 as one of four outstanding seniors to be honored for overall excellence and achievement, and was a member of the Student Legislative Council in 1974. Sciarra was quarterback for the Bruins 1972-1976 and named a consensus All-American in 1975. He starred in the 1976 Rose Bowl in which UCLA upset favored Ohio State University, which was unbeaten ranked number one in the nation, by a score of 23–10. Sciarra was named Most Valuable Player in the game. He ran for the most career yards by a quarterback in UCLA history. Sciarra was inducted into the UCLA Athletics Hall of Fame in 1994, and the National Football Foundation (College Football) Hall of Fame in 2014.

== Professional career ==
After graduating from UCLA in 1976, Sciarra was the 103rd overall pick in the fourth round by the Chicago Bears in the 1976 National Football League draft. He opted to sign a two-year contract with the BC Lions of the Canadian Football League on May 26, 1976. During the 1977 off season, Sciarra started his business career with Massachusetts Mutual Life Insurance Co. with a focus on selling life insurance within qualified pension plans.

=== Business ===
In 1978, Sciarra formed a company with two other colleagues, which included pension administration. In 1988 Sciarra sold his stake to his partners and joined Dun & Bradstreet Pension Services (“DBPS”) as Director of West Coast Operations. In 1994, DBPS was sold to U.S. Pension Services (“USPS”). Sciarra became a shareholder and held Director of Marketing & Sales and Operations Manager positions. USPS was sold to First Data Investor Services Group (“FDISG”) in 1998, whereby Sciarra was named Vice President of Sales. Shortly thereafter, FDISG was acquired by PFPC, a subsidiary of PNC Bank. Sciarra was named Senior Vice President & COO of PFPC’s Retirement Services. With revenues of approximately $70 million and 650 employees, he was tasked with the responsibility to strategically develop a plan for long term growth and profitability.

Through his analysis it was determined that a certain segment of the retirement services business be divested. Sciarra offered to acquire that segment of the business and it was accepted in June 2001. With that business, Sciarra and a long time co-worker formed National Retirement Services, Inc (“NRS”). Sciarra became the President & CEO of NRS.

After 16 years as President & CEO of NRS, and 40 years of service in the qualified retirement plan administration industry, Sciarra sold NRS to a pension administration and record keeping company, Ascensus, in December 2016.

Sciarra is currently a business consultant and conference speaker for a wide range of businesses and industries.

=== Professional football ===
==== BC Lions ====
John Sciarra signed a two-year contract with the BC Lions of the Canadian Football League on May 26, 1976. He was converted to Slotback early in the season and had 34 receptions for 563 yards. He earned the CFL's Most Outstanding Rookie Award in 1976. The next season, he tore his hamstring during the opening game of the 1977 regular season against Calgary. He returned late in the season with 5 receptions for 53 yards.

==== Philadelphia Eagles ====
The Tampa Bay Buccaneers signed Sciarra, and the Philadelphia Eagles traded an undisclosed draft pick to Tampa Bay in exchange for Sciarra in 1978. While with the Eagles, he played for coach Dick Vermeil, who had been his college coach at UCLA. Sciarra played 6 years with the Eagles (1978-1983) as Defensive Back, Punt Returner, and was named Most Valuable Player for Special Teams in 1979 and 1980. He was the NFC Punt Return Leader in 1979, and was named Captain of the Special Teams in 1982 and 1983. The Eagles won the NFC Championship in 1980 and played in Super Bowl XV.

== Awards and honors ==
On August 8, 1991, Sciarra was inducted into the Rose Bowl Hall of Fame. He was inducted into the UCLA Athletics Hall of Fame in 1994 and was inducted into the College Football Hall of Fame as a member of the Class of 2014.

== Personal ==
John Sciarra married his wife Michele in 1977 and together they have three children.
