= Wally Henry =

American football player (born 1954)

No. 89
- Position: Wide receiver

Personal information
- Born: October 30, 1954 (age 72); San Diego, California, U.S.
- Listed height: 5 ft 8 in (1.73 m)
- Listed weight: 175 lb (79 kg)

Career information
- High school: Lincoln (CA)
- College: UCLA
- NFL draft: 1977: undrafted

Career history
- Philadelphia Eagles (1977–1982)

Awards and highlights
- Pro Bowl (1979)

Career NFL statistics
- Receptions: 15
- Receiving yards: 229
- Touchdowns: 3
- Stats at Pro Football Reference

Wallace "Wally" Henry (born October 30, 1954) is an American former professional football player who was a wide receiver for six seasons with the Philadelphia Eagles of the National Football League (NFL). He went to the Pro Bowl after the 1979 season as a kick returner. Henry attended Lincoln High School in San Diego. He played college football for the UCLA Bruins.
