= 1976 Rose Bowl =

American college football game

- 62nd Rose Bowl Game
UCLA Bruins	Ohio State Buckeyes
(8–2–1)	(11–0)
Pac-8	Big Ten
23	10
Head coach: Dick Vermeil	Head coach: Woody Hayes
AP / Coaches; 11 / 12	AP / Coaches; 1 / 1
	1	2	3	4	Total
UCLA	0	0	16	7	23
Ohio State	3	0	0	7	10
- Date: January 1, 1976
- Season: 1975
- Stadium: Rose Bowl
- Location: Pasadena, California
- MVP: John Sciarra (UCLA QB)
- Favorite: Ohio State by 15½ points
- National anthem: UCLA Band and UCLA Choir featuring Kate Smith singing God Bless America, followed by the Star Spangled Banner
- Referee: Gene Calhoun (Big Ten); split crew: Big Ten, Pac-8)
- Halftime show: UCLA Band; The Ohio State University Marching Band
- Attendance: 105,464

United States TV coverage
- Network: NBC
- Announcers: Curt Gowdy, Al DeRogatis
- Nielsen ratings: 30.6

The 1976 Rose Bowl was the 62nd edition of the college football bowl game, played at the Rose Bowl in Pasadena, California, on Thursday, January 1. The UCLA Bruins of the Pacific-8 Conference defeated the top-ranked and undefeated Ohio State Buckeyes of the Big Ten Conference 23–10 in a rare bowl rematch of a regular season game. UCLA quarterback John Sciarra was named the Player of the Game.

This was the first post season that teams from the Big Ten and Pac-8 could appear in other bowl games since the Cotton Bowl in January 1949. Ohio State head coach Woody Hayes made his final appearance in the Rose Bowl, as Michigan represented the Big Ten in the next three editions.

== Background ==
The Rose Bowl was first played in January 1902, making it the oldest college football bowl game. It was then known as the Tournament East–West Football Game, reflecting its place as an event during the Tournament of Roses Parade. In the first playing, held at Tournament Park in Pasadena, Michigan defeated Stanford, 49–0. The Rose Bowl Stadium was built in 1922 and hosted its first Rose Bowl Game in 1923, which saw USC defeat Penn State. The Big Nine Conference, and the Pacific Coast Conference entered an agreement to send their champions to meet, beginning in the 1947 Rose Bowl. The Big Ten and AAWU agreed to provide teams for the game beginning with the 1963 Rose Bowl. The game would match the champions of the Big Ten and Pacific 8 conference.

Rose Bowl Stadium pre-game 1976
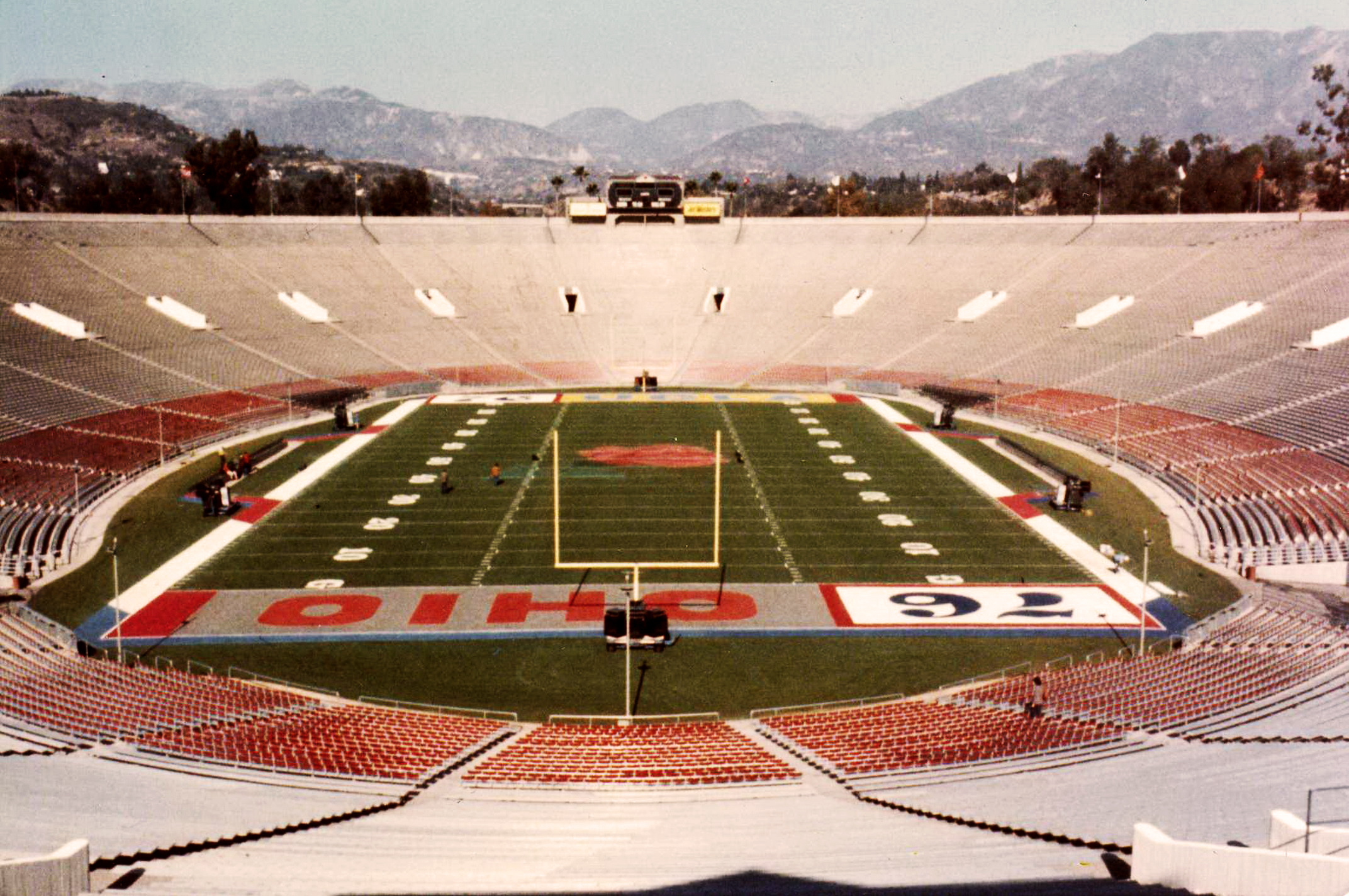
South end zone view

== Teams ==
This was the second meeting between the teams that season; Ohio State handed UCLA its first loss of the season, 41–20, at the Los Angeles Memorial Coliseum on October 4. After the game, Hayes prophetically told his Buckeyes that they would be facing UCLA again in the Rose Bowl; they were the only opponent to score more than fourteen points against Ohio State, and they did it twice. This would be the fourth meeting in the history of the schools, with Ohio State having a 2-1 record against UCLA. In 1962, an unranked UCLA defeated a #1 ranked Ohio State team at the Coliseum.

=== Ohio State Buckeyes ===
Hayes brought an 11–0 Ohio State team to Pasadena, featuring two-time Heisman Trophy winner Archie Griffin. It was a record fourth consecutive appearance for the 62-year-old Hayes, and his eighth and final appearance in the Rose Bowl. It was also a record fourth Rose Bowl start for Griffin; he was the only player to start in four until joined by Brian Cushing of USC in January 2009.

Ohio State capped an undefeated regular season with a 21–14 win over rival Michigan in Ann Arbor for Hayes' last outright Big Ten championship, and also his last victory over former assistant Bo Schembechler. The Wolverines held the Buckeyes scoreless in the second and third quarters. Tied at 14–14, and having already tied two non-conference opponents, the Wolverines needed a win to advance to Pasadena. With less than three minutes remaining, Michigan's freshman quarterback Rick Leach was intercepted by sophomore safety Ray Griffin, who returned it thirty yards down to the 3-yard line, and fullback Pete Johnson ran it in for the winning touchdown. Michigan was the Big Ten runner-up for a fourth straight year; in the previous three, they stayed home during bowl season because of conference rules. This year, #5 Michigan (8–1–2) was invited to the Orange Bowl to face #3 Oklahoma, the Big Eight champion.

Ohio State was a heavy favorite to win the Rose Bowl, by two touchdowns or more.

=== UCLA Bruins ===
In his second season as head coach, Dick Vermeil made his only Rose Bowl appearance; weeks later he left for the Philadelphia Eagles of the NFL. In addition to the 41–20 loss to Ohio State, UCLA also fell at home to Washington 17–13 and was tied by Air Force 20–20, but won their other six conference games, including a fumble-plagued 25–22 win over cross town rival USC to clinch the Rose Bowl berth. In that Friday night after Thanksgiving game, the Bruins fumbled 11 times and lost 8 of them, but their maligned defense bailed them out time and time again.

UCLA ended up tied with California for the Pac-8 championship, but advanced to the Rose Bowl on the strength of their 28–14 win in an October matchup with the Golden Bears. The 1975 USC-UCLA game was legendary coach John McKay's final game at the Coliseum; he left for the NFL's expansion Tampa Bay Buccaneers. As it turned out, it was also Vermeil's last game there.

This was UCLA's first Rose Bowl appearance in a full decade; in the 1966 edition, they also defeated a team which they had lost to earlier in the season, top-ranked Michigan State.

== Game summary ==
Both teams wore their home uniforms, Ohio State in scarlet jerseys, and UCLA in powderkeg blue jerseys. The weather was clear and 60 °F (16 °C).

Ohio State dominated the first half, but could only muster a field goal on its opening possession. UCLA did not gain a first down until late in the second quarter, but a couple of Ohio State turnovers and a key stop on 4th and 1 by the Bruin defense kept them in the game. The Buckeyes took a slim 3–0 lead to the locker room at halftime.

The second half saw underdog UCLA open up its offense, utilizing play-action and passing on first down. This helped open up their veer option rushing attack, and on their first possession of the third quarter, the Bruins marched to a tying field goal. After stopping Ohio State, UCLA then marched for a touchdown and a 9–3 lead (missed PAT). After stopping the Buckeyes again, the Bruins struck for the big play, a 67-yard touchdown pass from Sciarra to speedy flanker Wally Henry, and the 15½-point-underdog Bruins were up 16–3.

Ohio State, which inexplicably began passing the ball with regularity, returned to its dominating ground attack and scored early in the fourth quarter to cut UCLA's lead to 16–10. The Buckeyes got the ball right back, but again tried to resume an air attack. OSU quarterback Cornelius Greene was intercepted by Pat Schmidt, and on the ensuing possession with just under five minutes to play, Bruin running back Wendell Tyler took an option pitch, sped up the sideline, cut back at the perfect instant, and held the ball aloft as he crossed the goal line on a 54-yard run to clinch the game, 23–10. Another Greene interception killed any chance of a Buckeye last gasp comeback attempt. Woody Hayes then trudged across the field to congratulate Vermeil before the game was over.

=== Scoring ===
==== First quarter ====
- OSU: Tom Klaban, 42-yard field goal.

==== Second quarter ====
No scoring

==== Third quarter ====
- UCLA: Brett White, 33-yard field goal.
- UCLA: Wally Henry, 16-yard pass from John Sciarra (White kick failed)
- UCLA: Henry, 67-yard pass from Sciarra (White kick)

==== Fourth quarter ====
- OSU: Pete Johnson, 3-yard run (Klaban kick)
- UCLA: Wendell Tyler, 54-yard run (White kick)

=== Statistics ===
Statistics	UCLA	Ohio State
First downs	19	20
Total offense - Yards	414	298
Rushes yards (net)	202	208
Passing yards (net)	212	90
Passes, Comp-Att-Int	13–19–2	7–18–2
Penalties–Yards	4–30	3–25

== Aftermath ==
Woody Hayes had a very short meeting with the press in which he stated, "We got outcoached and just got beat." Aware of the Buckeye loss, the 1975 Oklahoma Sooners played for the number 1 ranking in the 1976 Orange Bowl, with Alabama lurking after already beating Penn State in the Sugar Bowl 13–6. Texas A&M, ranked #2 at the end of the regular season, lost to Arkansas for the Cotton Bowl berth, and then to USC in the Liberty Bowl. Oklahoma would finish #1 in the AP poll after defeating Michigan 14–6 in the Orange Bowl. Ohio State would finish 3rd, and UCLA Fifth.

Woody Hayes would finish with a 4–4 record in the Rose Bowl, and would be denied by Bo Schembechler, Rick Leach, and the rest of the Michigan Wolverines from reaching the Rose Bowl and winning the Big Ten championship again.

Dick Vermeil was able to move to the Philadelphia Eagles, whom he would lead to the Super Bowl in five years.

This was the second time UCLA had defeated the #1 team in the Rose Bowl after having lost to that same team during the season. The other time was in the 1966 Rose Bowl vs. Michigan State. This was also the second defeat of a #1 ranked Ohio State team by UCLA.

In The Official Ohio State Football Encyclopedia, this loss is listed as one of the most devastating setbacks in Ohio State football history.

By the 1982 college football season, UCLA would make the Rose Bowl their home stadium, moving from the Los Angeles Coliseum. As of 2025, the attendance of 105,464 still stands as the largest crowd to ever watch a UCLA football game in the Rose Bowl stadium. It is a record that is not likely to be broken, as the Rose Bowl seating was reduced after the 1997 football season to 91,136 for UCLA Bruins Football and 92,542 for the Rose Bowl Game.

The two teams would split 4 more games leaving them with a 4-4-1 record before their first meeting as Big Ten conference members in 2025, in which again Ohio State was ranked #1 and defeated UCLA 48-10.

== See also ==
- List of college football post-season games that were rematches of regular season games

== Bibliography ==
- UCLA Football Media Guide (PDF Copy available at www.uclabruins.com)
- Ohio State Football Media Guide (individual sections available at www.ohiostatebuckeyes.com)
