= 1977 Big Ten Conference football season =

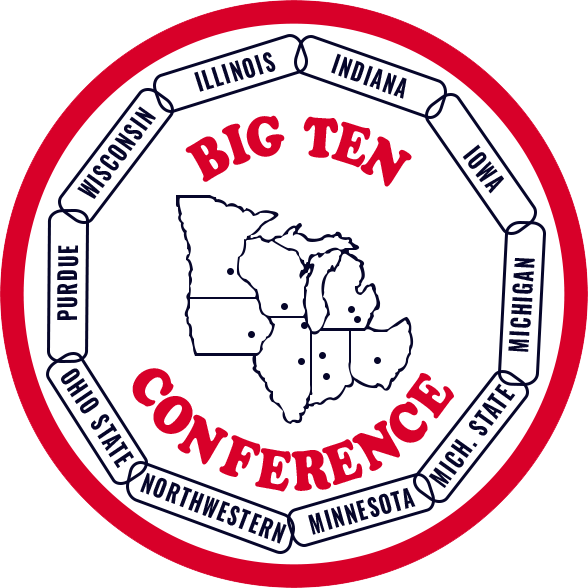
- Sport: American football
- Teams: 10
- Top draft pick: Chris Ward
- Co-champions: Michigan, Ohio State
- Runners-up: Michigan State
- Season MVP: Larry Bethea

Seasons
- 1976 1978

1977 Big Ten Conference football standings
	Conf.					Overall
Team	W		L		T	W		L		T
No. 9 Michigan +	7	–	1	–	0	10	–	2	–	0
No. 11 Ohio State +	7	–	1	–	0	9	–	3	–	0
Michigan State	6	–	1	–	1	7	–	3	–	1
Indiana	4	–	3	–	1	5	–	5	–	1
Minnesota	4	–	4	–	0	7	–	5	–	0
Purdue	3	–	5	–	0	5	–	6	–	0
Iowa	3	–	5	–	0	5	–	6	–	0
Wisconsin	3	–	6	–	0	5	–	6	–	0
Illinois	2	–	6	–	0	3	–	8	–	0
Northwestern	1	–	8	–	0	1	–	10	–	0
+ – Conference co-champions; Rankings from AP Poll

The 1977 Big Ten Conference football season was the 82nd season of college football played by the member schools of the Big Ten Conference and was a part of the 1977 NCAA Division I football season.

The 1977 Michigan Wolverines football team, under head coach Bo Schembechler, compiled a 10–2 record, tied for the Big Ten championship, led the conference in scoring offense (29.4 points per games), lost to Washington in the 1978 Rose Bowl, and was ranked No. 9 in the final AP Poll and No. 8 in the final UPI Poll. Rick Leach totaled 1,109 passing yards and 370 rushing yards and finished eighth in the voting for the Heisman Trophy. Russell Davis led the team with 1,013 rushing yards and finished second in the voting for the Chicago Tribune Silver Football. Three Michigan players received first-team honors on the 1977 College Football All-America Team: (1) offensive guard Mark Donahue (consensus); (2) center Walt Downing; and (3) linebacker John Anderson.

The 1977 Ohio State Buckeyes football team, under head coach Woody Hayes, compiled a 9–3 record, tied with Michigan for the Big Ten championship, led the conference in scoring defense (10.0 points allowed per game), lost to Alabama in the 1978 Sugar Bowl, and was ranked No. 11 in the AP Poll. Ron Springs led the conference with 1,166 rushing yards. Four Ohio State players received first-team All-America honors: offensive tackle Chris Ward (consensus); linebacker Tom Cousineau (consensus); middle guard Aaron Brown; and defensive back Ray Griffin.

Mark Herrmann of Purdue led the conference with 2,453 passing yards. Defensive end Larry Bethea of Michigan State won the Chicago Tribune Silver Football as the Big Ten's most valuable player.

== Season overview ==
=== Results and team statistics ===
Conf. Rank	Team	Head coach	AP final	AP high	Overall record	Conf. record	PPG	PAG	MVP
1 (tie)	Michigan	Bo Schembechler	#9	#1	10–2	7–1	**29.4**	10.3	Russell Davis
1 (tie)	Ohio State	Woody Hayes	#11	#3	9–3	7–1	28.6	**10.0**	Dave Adkins
3	Michigan State	Darryl Rogers	NR	NR	7–3–1	6–1–1	23.6	14.7	**Larry Bethea**
4	Indiana	Lee Corso	NR	NR	5–5–1	4–3–1	18.6	20.7	Joe Norman
5	Minnesota	Cal Stoll	NR	#19	7–5	4–4	14.3	15.0	Steve Midboe
6 (tie)	Purdue	Jim Young	NR	NR	5–6	3–5	21.0	22.5	Fred Arrington
6 (tie)	Iowa	Bob Commings	NR	NR	4–7	3–5	15.5	20.8	Dean Moore; Rod Sears
8	Wisconsin	John Jardine	NR	#14	5–6	3–6	12.1	18.2	Dave Crossen
9	Illinois	Gary Moeller	NR	NR	3–8	2–6	12.8	26.5	John Sullivan
10	Northwestern	John Pont	NR	NR	1–10	1–8	12.8	26.5	Paul Maly

Key
AP final = Team's rank in the final AP Poll of the 1977 season
AP high = Team's highest rank in the AP Poll throughout the 1977 season
PPG = Average of points scored per game; conference leader's average displayed in bold
PAG = Average of points allowed per game; conference leader's average displayed in bold
MVP = Most valuable player as voted by players on each team as part of the voting process to determine the winner of the Chicago Tribune Silver Football trophy; trophy winner in bold

=== Regular season ===
==== September 10 ====
On September 10, 1977, the Big Ten teams opened their seasons with four conference games and two non-conference games. The non-conference games both resulted in wins.

- Michigan 37, Illinois 9. Michigan (ranked No. 2 in the AP Poll) defeated Illinois, 37-9, at Memorial Stadium in Champaign, Illinois. The game matched Michigan coach Bo Schembechler against his former defensive coordinator, Gary Moeller, who took over as Illinois' head coach in 1977. The game attracted a crowd of 60,477, the largest opening day crowd in Illinois school history. Michigan quarterback Rick Leach rushed for 78 yards and completed 6 of 11 passes for 76 yards, including touchdown passes of 30 yards to Ralph Clayton and 11 yards to Gene Johnson. Running back Harlan Huckleby rushed for 128 yards and two touchdowns on 24 carries. Russell Davis also rushed for 99 yards and a touchdown on 18 carries.
- Michigan State 19, Purdue 14. Michigan State defeated Purdue, 19–14, before a crowd of 53,014 at Spartan Stadium in East Lansing, Michigan.
- Wisconsin 30, Indiana 14. Wisconsin defeated Indiana, 30–14, before a crowd of 34,755 at Memorial Stadium in Bloomington, Indiana.
- Iowa 24, Northwestern 0. Iowa defeated Northwestern, 24–0, before a crowd of 53,725 at Kinnick Stadium in Iowa City, Iowa.
- Ohio State 10, Miami (FL) 0. Ohio State (ranked No. 5 in the AP Poll) defeated Miami (FL), 10-0, before a crowd of 86,287 at Ohio Stadium in Columbus, Ohio. The game was Lou Saban's debut with Miami after spending 15 of the prior 17 years as a head coach in the AFL and NFL. Ohio State's lone touchdown came on a 93-yard drive in the second quarter and was capped by Ron Springs' 21-yard touchdown run.
- Minnesota 10, Western Michigan 7. Minnesota defeated Western Michigan, 10-7, before a crowd of 29,619 at Memorial Stadium in Minneapolis.

==== September 17 ====
On September 17, 1977, the Big Ten teams played one conference game and eight non-conference games. The non-conference games resulted in six wins and two losses, giving the Big Ten an 8–2 non-conference record to that point in the season.

- Ohio State 38, Minnesota 7. In the only conference game of the week, Ohio State (ranked No. 6 in the AP Poll) defeated Minnesota, 38-7, before a crowd of 87,799 at Ohio Stadium in Columbus, Ohio. Ron Springs rushed for 147 yards for the Buckeyes.
- Michigan 21, Duke 9. Michigan (ranked No. 1 in the AP Poll) defeated Duke, 21-9, in front of a crowd of 104,072 at Michigan Stadium. On the opening kickoff, Harlan Huckleby stepped across the goal line to the one-yard line, then stepped back, with the ball being marked down at the one-yard line. From there, Michigan was penalized for being offside and then for delay of game. Michigan did not score in the first quarter, but then scored two touchdowns in the second quarter. Rick Leach rushed for 99 yards and two touchdowns and completed six of 11 passes for 76 yards. Russell Davis also rushed for 95 yards and a touchdown.
- Washington State 23, Michigan State 21. Michigan State lost to Washington State, 23–21, before a crowd of 50,263 at Spartan Stadium in East Lansing, Michigan.
- Indiana 24, LSU 21. Indiana defeated LSU, 24–21, at Memorial Stadium in Bloomington, Indiana.
- Purdue 44, Ohio 7. Purdue defeated Ohio, 44–7, before a crowd of 49,354 at Ross–Ade Stadium in West Lafayette, Indiana.
- Wisconsin 14, Northern Illinois 3. Wisconsin defeated Northern Illinois, 14–3, before a crowd of 64,475 at Camp Randall Stadium in Madison, Wisconsin.
- Iowa 12, Iowa State 10. In the annual battle for the Cy-Hawk Trophy, Iowa defeated Iowa State, 12–10, before a crowd of 59,725 at Kinnick Stadium in Iowa City.
- Illinois 11, Missouri 7.
- Arizona State 35, Northwestern 3.

==== September 24 ====
On October 24, 1977, the Big Ten teams participated in 10 non-conference games, resulting in four wins and six losses. The days results gave the Big Ten a 12–8 non-conference record to that point in the season.

- Oklahoma 29, Ohio State 28. Ohio State (ranked No. 4 in the AP Poll) lost to Oklahoma (ranked No. 3), 29–28, before a crowd of 88,119 at Ohio Stadium (the third largest in stadium history to that point) in Columbus, Ohio. Oklahoma took a 20-0 lead early in the second quarter, but Ohio State then scored 28 unanswered points and led, 28-20, with six-and-a-half minutes left in the game. At that point, Ohio State backup quarterback Greg Castignola fumbled, and Oklahoma took over on Ohio State's 43-yard line. On the ensuing drive, Ohio State stopped Oklahoma on a fourth down play with four yards to go at the Buckeyes' 12-yard line, but an offside penalty resulted in a first down at the seven-yard line. Oklahoma scored a touchdown, but a run for two-point conversion to tie the game was stopped at the two-yard line by a swarming Ohio State defense. With only a minute-and-a-half remaining in the game, Ohio State players celebrated on the field, with a couple rolling playfully onto the AstroTurf. Oklahoma's onside kick bounced off an Ohio State player and was recovered for the Sooners by Mike Babb. Uwe von Schamann, a former soccer player from West Berlin, practiced transcendental meditation, smiled, and calmly participated in an Ohio State cheer as Woody Hayes called timeout in an attempt to ice the kicker. Von Schamman then kicked a 41-yard, game-winning field goal as the game's final three seconds ticked off the clock.
- Michigan 14, Navy 7. Michigan defeated Navy, 14-7, before a crowd of 101,800 at Michigan Stadium. Michigan's points were all scored in the second quarter on runs of 13 and 34 yards by running back Harlan Huckleby. Huckleby rushed for 147 yards, and Russell Davis added 93 more, but Navy out-gained Michigan by 301 total yards to 277 total yards. Michigan had defeated Navy by 56 points in 1976, and the seven-point victory in 1977 was considered a disappointment. After the game, Michigan dropped from No. 1 to No. 3 in the AP and Coaches' Polls.
- Michigan State 34, Wyoming 16. Michigan State defeated Wyoming, 34–16, before a crowd of 56,214 at Spartan Stadium in East Lansing, Michigan.
- Miami (OH) 21, Indiana 20. Indiana lost to Miami (OH), 21–20, at Memorial Stadium in Bloomington, Indiana.
- Minnesota 27, UCLA 13. Minnesota defeated UCLA, 27-13, before a crowd of 41,076 at Memorial Stadium in Minneapolis.

3

- Notre Dame 34, Purdue 21. In the annual battle for the Shillelagh Trophy, Purdue lost to Notre Dame, 31–24, before a crowd of 68,966 at Ross–Ade Stadium in West Lafayette, Indiana.
- Wisconsin 22, Oregon 10. Wisconsin defeated Oregon, 22–10, before a crowd of 30,755 at Autzen Stadium in Eugene, Oregon.
- Stanford 37, Illinois 24.
- Arizona 41, Iowa 7. Iowa lost to Arizona, 41–7, before a crowd of 53,110 at Kinnick Stadium in Iowa City.
- North Carolina 41, Northwestern 7.

==== October 1 ====
On October 1, 1977, the Big Ten teams played one conference game and eight non-conference games. The non-conference games resulted in four wins and four losses, giving the Big Ten a 16–12 record to that point in the season.

- Wisconsin 19, Northwestern 7. In the week's only conference game, Wisconsin defeated Northwestern, 19-7, before a crowd of 68,709 at Camp Randall Stadium in Madison, Wisconsin.
- Michigan 41, Texas A&M 3. Michigan (ranked No. 3 in the AP Poll) defeated Texas A&M (ranked No. 5), 41-3, in front of 104,802 spectators at Michigan Stadium. Russell Davis rushed for 110 yards and two touchdowns, and Harlan Huckleby added 73 yards and a touchdown. Rick Leach also threw a 35-yard touchdown pass to Curt Stephenson. On defense, Ron Simpkins had 14 tackles, recovered a fumble, and blocked a punt that Jim Pickens recovered in the end zone for a touchdown. Mike Jolly also returned an interception 50 yards for a touchdown. After "skimpy victories" over Duke and Navy, the trouncing of the highly rated Aggies was considered "one of [Michigan's] most stunning performances in recent years. Columnist Joe Falls wrote: "It may have been Bo Schembechler's finest coaching job in his nine years at Michigan." Texas A&M coach Emory Bellard said, "Michigan came out in the second half and beat us every way you can beat a football team. . . . Michigan is an outstanding team."
- Ohio State 35, SMU 7. In a Saturday night game, Ohio State (ranked No. 6 in the AP Poll) defeated SMU, 35-7, before a crowd of 51,970 (SMU's biggest home crowd in 12 years) at the Cotton Bowl in Dallas. Ohio State intercepted seven SMU passes and led, 35-0, before SMU scored its touchdown in the fourth quarter.
- Notre Dame 16, Michigan State 6. Michigan State lost to Notre Dame, 16–6, before a crowd of 59,075 at Notre Dame Stadium.
- Nebraska 31, Indiana 13. Indiana lost to Nebraska (ranked No. 11 in the AP Poll), 31–13, before a crowd of 76,034 at Memorial Stadium in Lincoln, Nebraska.
- Minnesota 19, Washington 7. Minnesota defeated Washington, 19-17, before a crowd of 31,895 at Memorial Stadium in Minneapolis.
- Purdue 26, Wake Forest 17. Purdue defeated Wake Forest, 26–17, before a crowd of 54,060 at Ross–Ade Stadium in West Lafayette, Indiana.
- UCLA 34, Iowa 16. Iowa lost to UCLA, 34–16, before a crowd of 35,636 at the Los Angeles Memorial Coliseum.
- Syracuse 30, Illinois 20.

==== October 8 ====
On October 8, 1977, the Big Ten teams played five conference games.

- Michigan 24, Michigan State 14. Michigan (ranked No. 3 in the AP Poll) defeated Michigan State, 24-14, before a crowd of 78,183 at Spartan Stadium. Michigan State took a 7-0 lead on a 19-yard touchdown pass from Ed Smith to Kirk Gibson. Michigan responded with a 12-yard touchdown pass from Rick Leach to White and a 50-yard field goal to take a 10-7 lead at halftime. Michigan extended its lead to 24-7 in the third quarter on touchdown runs by Russell Davis and Ed Leach. Harlan Huckleby rushed for 146 yards, and Davis added 96 yards. Ralph Clayton caught three passes for 99 yards. Michigan completed four of 10 passes in the game and threw only one pass in the second half.
- Ohio State 46, Purdue 0. Ohio State (ranked No. 4 in the AP Poll) defeated Purdue, 46–0, before a crowd of 87,707 at Ohio Stadium in Columbus.
- Iowa 18, Minnesota 6. Iowa defeated Minnesota, 18-6, before a crowd of 57,460 at Kinnick Stadium in Iowa City.
- Indiana 28, Northwestern 3. Indiana defeated Northwestern, 28–3, at Dyche Stadium in Evanston, Illinois.
- Wisconsin 26, Illinois 0. Wisconsin defeated Illinois, 26–0, before a crowd of 78,661 at Camp Randall Stadium in Madison, Wisconsin.

==== October 15 ====
On October 15, 1977, the Big Ten teams played five conference games.

- Michigan 56, Wisconsin 0. Michigan (ranked No. 1 in the AP Poll) defeated undefeated Wisconsin (ranked No. 14), 56-0, in front of 104,892 spectators at Michigan Stadium. Rick Leach rushed for 32 yards and a touchdown and completed 10 of 16 passes for 127 yards, including touchdown passes to Doug Marsh and Gene Johnson. Roosevelt Smith rushed for 157 yards and two touchdowns, and Russell Davis rushed for 105 yards and a touchdown. Stanley Edwards and B. J. Dickey also scored rushing touchdowns. After the game, Michigan coach Bo Schembechler said, "We played this one as a big game and it turned out that way."
- Ohio State 27, Iowa 6. Ohio State (ranked No. 5 in the AP Poll) defeated Iowa, 27–6, before a crowd of 60,070 at Kinnick Stadium in Iowa City.
- Indiana 13, Michigan State 13. Indiana and Michigan State played to a 13–13 tie before a crowd of 36,982 at Memorial Stadium in Bloomington, Indiana.
- Minnesota 13, Northwestern 7. Minnesota defeated Northwestern, 13-7, before a crowd of 39,021 at Memorial Stadium in Minneapolis.
- Illinois 29, Purdue 22. Illinois defeated Purdue, 29–22, before a crowd of 60,242 at Ross–Ade Stadium in West Lafayette, Indiana.

==== October 22 ====
On October 22, 1977, the Big Ten teams played five conference games.

- Minnesota 16, Michigan 0. Michigan (ranked No. 1 in the AP Poll) lost to unranked Minnesota, 16-0, before a crowd of 44,165 at Memorial Stadium in Minneapolis. All 16 of Minnesota points were scored by Paul Rogind (three field goals and an extra point) and Marion Barber, Jr. (three-yard touchdown run). Both Rogind and Barber were from the State of Michigan. Michigan's offense was shut out for the first time in 112 games dating back to 1967. After the game, Minnesota's players swarmed across the field to reclaim the Little Brown Jug trophy that had been in Michigan's custody for a decade. After the game the Detroit Free Press wrote: "In one fell swoop, Minnesota took away Michigan's No. 1 rating, its undefeated season, and, oh yes, that little chunk of pottery known as the Little Brown Jug."
- Ohio State 35, Northwestern 15. Ohio State defeated Northwestern, 35–15, before a crowd of 29,563 at Dyche Stadium in Evanston, Illinois.
- Michigan State 9, Wisconsin 7. Michigan State defeated Wisconsin, 9–7, before a crowd of 79,203 at Camp Randall Stadium in Madison, Wisconsin.
- Illinois 21, Indiana 7. Illinois defeated Indiana, 21–7, at Memorial Stadium in Champaign, Illinois.
- Purdue 34, Iowa 21. Purdue defeated Iowa, 34–21, before a crowd of 62,443 at Ross–Ade Stadium in West Lafayette, Indiana.

==== October 29 ====
On October 29, 1977, the Big Ten teams played five conference games.

- Michigan 23, Iowa 6. Michigan (ranked No. 6 in the AP Poll) defeated Iowa, 23–6, before a crowd of 104,617 at the annual homecoming game at Michigan Stadium. Rick Leach completed nine of 12 passes for 202 yards, including touchdown passes covering 63 yards to Russell Davis, six yards to Gene Johnson, and 32 yards to Rick White. Leach's three touchdown passes gave him 25 for his career, breaking the record of 23 set by Bob Chappuis in the 1940s. Michigan also scored on a safety in the fourth quarter when linebacker Dom Tedesco tackled Iowa's quarterback in the end zone. After the game, Bo Schembechler said, "That was a devastating defeat a week ago. No one will ever know how hard it was to come back from that game."
- Ohio State 42, Wisconsin 0. Ohio State defeated Wisconsin, 42–0, before a crowd of 87,837 at Ohio Stadium in Columbus.
- Michigan State 49, Illinois 20. Michigan State defeated Illinois, 49–20, before a crowd of 70,589 at Spartan Stadium in East Lansing, Michigan.
- Indiana 34, Minnesota 22. Indiana defeated Minnesota, 34–22, before a crowd of 30,399 at Memorial Stadium in Bloomington, Indiana.
- Purdue 28, Northwestern 16. Purdue defeated Northwestern, 28–16, before a crowd of 17,525 at Dyche Stadium in Evanston, Illinois.

==== November 5 ====
On November 5, 1977, the Big Ten teams played five conference games.

- Michigan 63, Northwestern 20. Michigan defeated Northwestern, 63–20, before a crowd of 103,211 at Michigan Stadium in Ann Arbor. With the game well in hand, 77 Michigan players saw action in the game. Michigan totaled 511 yards of total offense. Quarterback Rick Leach completed 8 of 11 passes for 155 yards to become Michigan's all-time career passing yardage leader. Asked about running up the score, Bo Schembechler said, "What am I supposed to do? Tie his hands behind his back and buck into the line every time? When I've got my fourth lineup in there I can do as I damned please and I don't have to make any explanations."
- Ohio State 35, Illinois 0. In the annual battle for the Illibuck, Ohio State defeated Illinois, 35–0, before a homecoming crowd of 66,973 at Memorial Stadium in Champaign, Illinois. The Buckeyes totaled 402 rushing yards, including 132 yards by Ron Springs.
- Michigan State 29, Minnesota 10. Michigan State defeated Minnesota, 29–10, before a crowd of 30,600 at Memorial Stadium in Minneapolis. The game was referred to as the "Probation Bowl" as both teams were under NCAA probation. The Spartans were trailing, 10-3, at halftime before scoring 26 unanswered points in the second half. Ed Smith completed 9 of 18 passes for 235 yards, including three receptions by Kirk Gibson for 148 yards. Leroy McGee also rushed for 102 yards on 12 carries for the Spartans.
- Indiana 24, Iowa 21. Indiana defeated Iowa, 24–21, before a crowd of 49,620 at Kinnick Stadium in Iowa City. Indiana placekicker David Freud, a veteran of the Israeli army, kicked the game-winning field goal with 16 seconds left. Freshman quarterback Tim Clifford entered the game with the Hoosiers trailing, 14-7. In his first significant playing time, Clifford passed for 145 yards and led an Indiana comeback.
- Purdue 22, Wisconsin 0. Purdue defeated Wisconsin, 22–0, before a crowd of 73,322 at Camp Randall Stadium in Madison, Wisconsin. Purdue coach Jim Young called it the team's best defensive performance of the season. In the fourth quarter, Purdue's Calvin Clark tackled Wisconsin's quarterback in the end zone for a safety. Then, with less than a minute left in the game, Keena Turner intercepted a Wisconsin pass and returned it 66 yards for a touchdown. Freshman quarterback Mark Herrmann completed 10 of 20 passes for 174 yards.

==== November 12 ====
On November 12, 1977, the Big Ten teams played five conference games.

- Michigan 40, Purdue 7. Michigan (ranked No. 6 in the AP Poll) defeated Purdue, 40–7, before a crowd of 68,003 at Ross–Ade Stadium in West Lafayette, Indiana. Purdue's freshman quarterback Mark Herrmann completed 10 of 27 passes for 74 yards and was intercepted three times. Russell Davis had 167 rushing yards for Michigan.
- Ohio State 35, Indiana 7. Ohio State (ranked No. 4 in the AP Poll) defeated Indiana, 35–7, before a crowd of 87,786 at Ohio Stadium in Columbus. Ohio State rushed for 368 yards, including 148 yards by Jeff Logan, to remain the No. 1 rushing team in the country.
- Michigan State 44, Northwestern 3. Michigan State defeated Northwestern, 44–3, before a crowd of 61,228 at Spartan Stadium in East Lansing, Michigan. The Spartans totaled 607 yards of total offense. Ed Smith completed 15 of 24 passes for 286 yards, including seven to Mark Brammer for 108 yards and three to Kirk Gibson for 103 yards.
- Minnesota 21, Illinois 0. Minnesota defeated Illinois, 21-0, before a crowd of 37,689 at Memorial Stadium in Champaign, Illinois. Fullback Kent Kitzmann rushed for 266 yards, a Minnesota single-game record, and also set NCAA records for rushing carries (57) and most consecutive rushes (14).
- Iowa 24, Wisconsin 8. Iowa defeated Wisconsin, 24–8, before a crowd of 71,763 at Camp Randall Stadium in Madison, Wisconsin. The game was the last for John Jardine who had announced his resignation the previous Monday. Wisconsin won its first five games to be ranked No. 14 in the AP Poll before losing the final six games in which they were outscored, 177 to 23.

==== November 19 ====
On November 19, 1977, the Big Ten teams played five conference games.

- Michigan 14, Ohio State 6. Michigan (ranked No. 5 in the AP Poll) defeated Ohio State (ranked No. 4), 14-6, before an NCAA record crowd of 106,024 at Michigan Stadium in Ann Arbor. In a defensive battle, Ohio State held Michigan to 10 first downs, 141 rushing yards, and 55 passing yards, but scored on short runs by Roosevelt Smith and Rick Leach in the second and third quarters. Michigan's defense held Ohio State to a pair of Vlade Janakievski field goals and had "five dramatic defensive stands." Michigan linebacker Ron Simpkins registered 20 tackles. With four minutes remaining in the game, Ohio State quarterback Rod Gerald was hit by Michigan linebacker John Anderson at the eight-yard line, resulting in a fumble recovered by Michigan.

On the sideline after Gerald's fourth quarter fumble, Ohio State coach Woody Hayes threw his phone to the ground, charged an ABC-TV cameraman who was filming him, and punched the cameraman in the stomach as the national TV audience watched. After the game, Hayes called it "the best game we ever played and lost," but stormed out of the press conference when asked about the incident with the cameraman. Detroit Free Press columnist Joe Falls called Hayes "a disgrace to his profession" for punching the cameraman and for also "taking a swipe" at a Michigan student who was holding up the "M" banner before the game.

- Michigan State 22, Iowa 16. Michigan State defeated Iowa, 22–16, before a crowd of 43,700 at Kinnick Stadium at Iowa City. The game was played in gale-force wind and cold temperature with neither team scoring a touchdown or field goal while playing against the wind.
- Minnesota 13, Wisconsin 7. In the annual battle for Paul Bunyan's Axe, Minnesota defeated Wisconsin, 13-7, before a crowd of 30,742 at Memorial Stadium in Minneapolis. The game was played in cold weather and snow flurries. Minnesota fullback Kent Kitzmann rushed for 154 yards on 40 carries.
- Indiana 21, Purdue 10. In the annual battle for the Old Oaken Bucket, Indiana defeated Purdue, 21–10, before a crowd of 52,914 at Memorial Stadium in Bloomington, Indiana. Tailback Darrick Burnett rushed for 195 yards on 40 carries.
- Northwestern 21, Illinois 7. In the annual battle for the Sweet Sioux Tomahawk, Northwestern defeated Illinois, 21-7, at Dyche Stadium in Evanston, Illinois. Dave Mishier rushed for 109 yards for the Wildcats. The victory avoided a winless season and gave John Pont a victory in his last game as Northwestern's head coach.

=== Bowl games ===
==== 1978 Rose Bowl ====
On January 2, 1978, Michigan (ranked No. 4 in the AP Poll) lost to Washington (ranked No. 13), 27–20, before a crowd of 105,312 in the 1978 Rose Bowl in Pasadena, California. Washington was a two touchdown underdog but shot out to a 17-0 lead at halftime and a 24-0 lead in the third quarter. Resorting to a passing offense to overcome the point deficit, Michigan's Rick Leach threw touchdown passes in the last 20 minutes, including passes covering 76 yards to Curt Stephenson and 32 yards to Stan Edwards. Michigan's comeback was ultimately stopped by two interceptions deep in Washington territory.

==== 1978 Sugar Bowl ====
On January 2, 1978, Ohio State (ranked No. 3 in the AP Poll) lost to Bear Bryant's Alabama Crimson Tide (ranked No. 9), 35–6, before a crowd of 76,811 in the 1978 Sugar Bowl in New Orleans. Ohio State did not score until the fourth quarter when Rod Gerald threw a 38-yard touchdown pass to Jim Harrell.

==== 1977 Hall of Fame Classic ====
On December 22, 1977, Minnesota lost to Maryland, 17–7, before a crowd of 47,000 in the first 1977 Hall of Fame Classic on Legion Field in Birmingham, Alabama. Marion Barber, Jr. scored Minnesota's touchdown in the first quarter.

== Statistical leaders ==
=== Passing yards ===
1. Mark Herrmann, Purdue (2,453)
2. Ed Smith, Michigan State (1,731)
3. Rick Leach, Michigan (1,109)
4. Tom McLaughlin, Iowa (1,081)
5. Rod Gerald, Ohio State (1,016)

=== Rushing yards ===
1. Ron Springs, Ohio State (1,166)
2. Russell Davis, Michigan (1,013)
3. Ric Enis, Indiana (978)
4. Darrick Burnett • Indiana (774)
5. Harlan Huckleby, Michigan (743)

=== Receiving yards ===
1. Reggie Arnold, Purdue (840)
2. Keith Calvin, Indiana (604)
3. Ray Smith, Purdue (565)
4. Kirk Gibson, Michigan State (531)
5. David Charles, Wisconsin (437)

=== Total offense ===
1. Mark Herrmann, Purdue (2,190)
2. Ed Smith, Michigan State (1,571)
3. Rick Leach, Michigan (1,479)
4. Rod Gerald, Ohio State (1,462)
5. Scott Arnett, Indiana (1,197)

=== Passing efficiency rating ===
1. Mark Herrmann, Purdue (121.1)
2. Ed Smith, Michigan State (111.4)

=== Rushing yards per attempt ===
1. Jim Earley, Michigan State (6.1)
2. Ron Springs, Ohio State (5.8)
3. Jeff Logan, Ohio State (5.7)
4. James Coleman, Illinois (5.0)
5. Darrick Burnett, Indiana (4.9)

=== Yards per reception ===
1. Kirk Gibson, Michigan State (24.1)
2. Reggie Arnold, Purdue (19.1)
3. Edgar Wilson, Michigan State (18.2)
4. Mark Bailey, Northwestern (15.8)
5. David Charles, Wisconsin (15.1)

=== Points scored ===
1. Hans Nielsen, Michigan State (78)
1. Joel Payton, Ohio State (78)
3. Paul Rogind, Minnesota (68)
4. Vlade Janakievski, Ohio State (65)
5. Scott Sovereign, Purdue (59)

== Awards and honors ==
=== All-Big Ten honors ===
The following players were picked by the Associated Press (AP) and/or the United Press International (UPI) as first-team players on the 1977 All-Big Ten Conference football team.

Offense

Position	Name	Team	Selectors
Quarterback	Rick Leach	Michigan	AP
Quarterback	Rod Gerald	Ohio State	UPI
Running back	Ron Springs	Ohio State	AP, UPI
Running back	Ric Enis	Indiana	AP UPI
Running back	Jeff Logan	Ohio State	UPI
Flanker	Keith Calvin	Indiana	AP
Wide receiver	Reggie Arnold	Purdue	AP, UPI
Tight end	Jimmy Moore	Ohio State	AP, UPI
Center	Walt Downing	Michigan	AP
Center	Al Pitts	Michigan State	UPI
Guard	Mark Donahue	Michigan	AP, UPI
Guard	Kevin Pancratz	Illinois	AP, UPI
Tackle	Chris Ward	Ohio State	AP, UPI
Tackle	Mike Kenn	Michigan	AP
Tackle	Charles Peal	Indiana	UPI

Defense

Position	Name	Team	Selectors
Front five	Larry Bethea	Michigan State	AP, UPI [def. tackle]
Front five	Aaron Brown	Ohio State	AP, UPI [middle guard]
Front five	Kelton Dansler	Ohio State	AP, UPI [def. end]
Front five	Steve Midboe	Minnesota	AP, UPI [def. tackle]
Front five	Dennis Stejskal	Wisconsin	AP, UPI [def. end]
Defensive end	John Anderson	Michigan	UPI [def. end]
Linebacker	Tom Cousineau	Ohio State	AP, UPI
Linebacker	Tom Rusk	Iowa	AP, UPI
Linebacker	John Sullivan	Illinois	AP
Linebacker	Ron Simpkins	Michigan	UPI
Defensive back	Ray Griffin	Ohio State	AP, UPI
Defensive back	Mike Guess	Ohio State	AP, UPI
Defensive back	Dwight Hicks	Michigan	AP, UPI
Defensive back	Jim Pickens	Michigan	UPI

=== All-American honors ===
At the end of the 1977 season, Big Ten players secured three of the consensus first-team picks for the 1977 College Football All-America Team. The Big Ten's consensus All-Americans were:

Position	Name	Team	Selectors
Offensive guard	Mark Donahue	Michigan	AFCA, AP, FWAA, UPI, FN, NEA, TSN, WCFF
Offensive tackle	Chris Ward	Ohio State	AFCA, AP, FWAA, UPI, FN, NEA, TSN, WCFF
Linebacker	Tom Cousineau	Ohio State	FWAA, UPI, WCFF

Other Big Ten players who were named first-team All-Americans by at least one selector were:

Position	Name	Team	Selectors
Center	Walt Downing	Michigan	AFCA, FN, TSN
Middle guard	Aaron Brown	Ohio State	AFCA, WCFF
Linebacker	John Anderson	Michigan	FWAA
Defensive back	Ray Griffin	Ohio State	NEA, TSN

=== Other awards ===
- Heisman Trophy voting: Michigan quarterback Rick Leach (eighth)
- Big Ten Coach of the Year: Darryl Rogers of Michigan State

== 1978 NFL draft ==
The 1978 NFL draft was held in New York on May 2–3, 1978. The following players were among the first 100 picks:

Name	Position	Team	Round	Overall pick
Chris Ward	Offensive tackle	Ohio State	1	4
Mike Kenn	Offensive tackle	Michigan	1	13
John Anderson	Linebacker	Michigan	1	26
Larry Bethea	Defensive end	Michigan State	1	28
Mark Merrill	Linebacker	Minnesota	2	31
Mike Hunt	Linebacker	Minnesota	2	34
Ray Griffin	Defensive back	Ohio State	2	35
Steve Stewart	Linebacker	Minnesota	2	43
Walt Downing	Offensive guard	Michigan	2	47
