= 1977 Ohio State Buckeyes football team =

American college football season

1977 Ohio State Buckeyes football
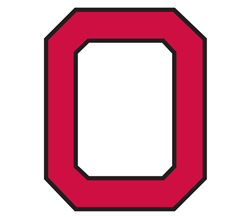

Big Ten co-champion

Sugar Bowl, L 6–35 vs. Alabama
- Conference: Big Ten Conference

Ranking
- Coaches: No. 12
- AP: No. 11
- Record: 9–3 (7–1 Big Ten)
- Head coach: Woody Hayes (27th season)
- Offensive coordinator: Alex Gibbs (3rd season)
- Defensive coordinator: George Hill (7th season)
- MVP: Dave Adkins
- Captains: Aaron Brown; Ray Griffin; Jeff Logan; Chris Ward
- Home stadium: Ohio Stadium

1977 Big Ten Conference football standings
	Conf.					Overall
Team	W		L		T	W		L		T
No. 9 Michigan +	7	–	1	–	0	10	–	2	–	0
No. 11 Ohio State +	7	–	1	–	0	9	–	3	–	0
Michigan State	6	–	1	–	1	7	–	3	–	1
Indiana	4	–	3	–	1	5	–	5	–	1
Minnesota	4	–	4	–	0	7	–	5	–	0
Purdue	3	–	5	–	0	5	–	6	–	0
Iowa	3	–	5	–	0	5	–	6	–	0
Wisconsin	3	–	6	–	0	5	–	6	–	0
Illinois	2	–	6	–	0	3	–	8	–	0
Northwestern	1	–	8	–	0	1	–	10	–	0
+ – Conference co-champions; Rankings from AP Poll

The 1977 Ohio State Buckeyes football team was an American football team that represented the Ohio State University as a member of the Big Ten Conference during the 1977 Big Ten season. In their 27th year under head coach Woody Hayes, the Buckeyes compiled a 9–3 record (7–1 in conference games), tied with Michigan for the Big Ten championship, and outscored opponents by a total of 337 to 85. In games against ranked opponents, they lost to No. 3 Oklahoma, No. 5 Michigan, and No. 3 Alabama in the 1978 Sugar Bowl. They were ranked as high as No. 3 but dropped to No. 11 in the final AP poll after losing to Michigan and Alabama.

The Buckeyes gained an average of 294.5 rushing yards and 84.8 passing yards per game. On defense, they held opponents to 119.6 rushing yards and 92.0 passing yards per game. The team's individual statistical leaders included quarterback Rod Gerald (913 passing yards, 61.9% completion percentage), running back Ron Springs (1,092 rushing yards, 5.7 yards per carry), and Jim Harrell (13 receptions for 310 yards). Offensive tackle Chris Ward and linebacker Tom Cousineau were consensus first-team All-Americans.

The team played its home games at Ohio Stadium in Columbus, Ohio.

== Schedule ==
Date	Time	Opponent	Rank	Site	TV	Result	Attendance	Source
September 10	1:30 p.m.	Miami (FL)*	No. 5	Ohio Stadium; Columbus, OH		W 10–0	86,287	
September 17	1:30 p.m.	Minnesota	No. 6	Ohio Stadium; Columbus, OH		W 38–7	87,799	
September 24	1:30 p.m.	No. 3 Oklahoma*	No. 4	Ohio Stadium; Columbus, OH	ABC	L 28–29	88,119	
October 1	8:30 p.m.	at SMU*	No. 6	Cotton Bowl; Dallas, TX		W 35–7	51,970	
October 8	1:30 p.m.	Purdue	No. 4	Ohio Stadium; Columbus, OH		W 46–0	87,707	
October 15	2:30 p.m.	at Iowa	No. 5	Kinnick Stadium; Iowa City, IA		W 27–6	60,070	
October 22	2:30 p.m.	at Northwestern	No. 4	Dyche Stadium; Evanston, IL		W 35–15	29,563	
October 29	1:30 p.m.	Wisconsin	No. 3	Ohio Stadium; Columbus, OH		W 42–0	87,837	
November 5	2:00 p.m.	at Illinois	No. 4	Memorial Stadium; Champaign, IL (Illibuck)		W 35–0	66,973	
November 12	1:30 p.m.	Indiana	No. 4	Ohio Stadium; Columbus, OH		W 35–7	87,786	
November 19	12:30 p.m.	at No. 5 Michigan	No. 4	Michigan Stadium; Ann Arbor, MI (rivalry)	ABC	L 6–14	106,024	
January 2, 1978	2:00 p.m.	vs. No. 3 Alabama*	No. 9	Louisiana Superdome; New Orleans, LA (Sugar Bowl)	ABC	L 6–35	76,811	
*Non-conference game; Rankings from AP Poll released prior to the game; All times are in Eastern time

== Game summaries ==
=== Miami (FL) ===
Team	1	2	3	4	Total
Miami (FL)	0	0	0	0	0
• Ohio St	0	10	0	0	10

- Date: September 10
- Location: Ohio Stadium
- Game start: 1:30 p.m. CST
- Elapsed time: 2:29
- Game attendance: 86,287
- Game weather: 78 °F (26 °C); wind 10–15 mph (16–24 km/h) WNW

Scoring summary
Q2	10:40	OSU	Janakievski 31 yard field goal	OSU 3–0
Q2	4:56	OSU	Springs 21 yard run (Janakievski kick)	OSU 10–0

- Ron Springs 27 Rush, 114 Yds

=== Minnesota ===
Team	1	2	3	4	Total
Minnesota	0	0	7	0	7
• Ohio St	7	3	7	21	38

- Date: September 17
- Location: Ohio Stadium
- Game start: 1:30 p.m. CST
- Elapsed time: 2:36
- Game attendance: 87,799
- Game weather: Mostly cloudy; 83 °F (28 °C); wind 5–15 mph (8.0–24.1 km/h) S–W

Scoring summary
Q1	6:57	OHST	Jones 29 yard pass from Gerald (Janakievski kick)	OHST 7–0
Q2	13:03	OHST	Janakievski 18 yard field goal	OHST 10–0
Q3	4:45	OHST	Volley 2 yard run (Janakievski kick)	OHST 17–0
Q3	4:29	MINN	Weber 100 yard kickoff return	OHST 17–7
Q4	9:16	OHST	Springs 8 yard run (Janakievski kick)	OHST 24–7
Q4	5:19	OHST	Donley 38 yard pass from Castignola (Janakievski kick)	OHST 31–7
Q4	0:41	OHST	Payton 7 yard run (Janakievski kick)	OHST 38–7

- Ron Springs 27 Rush, 147 Yds

=== Oklahoma ===
#3 Oklahoma Sooners (2–0) at #4 Ohio State Buckeyes (2–0)

Quarter	1	2	3	4	Total
Oklahoma	17	3	0	9	29
Ohio State	0	14	14	0	28

at Ohio Stadium, Columbus, Ohio

- Date: September 29
- Game time: 1:55 p.m.
- Game weather: Overcast, 78 °F (26 °C)
- Game attendance: 88,119
- Referee: Gene Calhoun (Big Ten)
- TV announcers (ABC): Keith Jackson, Ara Parseghian

Game information

First quarter

- OKLA – Elvis Peacock 33-yard run (Uwe von Schamann kick), 11:59. Oklahoma 7–0. Drive: 6 plays, 61 yards, 2:09.
- OKLA – Billy Sims 14-yard run (Uwe von Schamann kick), 11:05. Oklahoma 14–0. Drive: 2 plays, 16 yards, 0:45.
- OKLA – Uwe von Schamann 23-yard field goal, 3:29. Oklahoma 17–0. Drive: 12 plays, 60 yards, 6:08.

Second quarter

- OKLA – Uwe von Schamann 33-yard field goal, 12:58. Oklahoma 20–0. Drive: 9 plays, 45 yards, 3:31.
- OSU – Ron Springs 30-yard run (Vlade Janakievski kick), 10:32. Oklahoma 20–7. Drive: 7 plays, 80 yards, 2:23.
- OSU – Rod Gerald 19-yard run (Vlade Janakievski kick), 9:46. Oklahoma 20–14. Drive: 1 play, 19 yards, 0:06.

Third quarter

- OSU – Joel Payton 1-yard run (Vlade Janakievski kick), 8:04. Ohio State 21–20. Drive: 7 plays, 48 yards, 3:51.
- OSU – Jimmy Moore 16-yard pass from Greg Castignola (Vlade Janakievski kick), 4:44. Ohio State 28–20. Drive: 5 plays, 33 yards, 2:01.

Fourth quarter

- OKLA – Elvis Peacock 1-yard run (run failed), 1:29. Ohio State 28–26. Drive: 12 plays, 57 yards, 4:55.
- OKLA – Uwe von Schamann 41-yard field goal, 0:03. Oklahoma 29–28. Drive: 5 plays, 50 yards, 1:18.

Top passers

- OKLA – Dean Blevins – 3/5, 44 yards, 2 INT
- OSU – Greg Castignola – 2/2, 29 yards, TD

Top rushers

- OKLA – Billy Sims – 11 rushes, 60 yards, TD
- OSU – Ron Springs – 14 rushes, 64 yards, TD

Top receivers

- OKLA – Steve Rhodes – 3 receptions, 44 yards
- OSU – Jimmy Moore – 1 reception, 16 yards, TD

=== At SMU ===
Team	1	2	3	4	Total
• Ohio St	7	14	7	7	35
SMU	0	0	0	7	7

- Date: October 1
- Location: Cotton Bowl
- Game attendance: 51,970

=== Purdue ===
Purdue Boilermakers at Ohio State Buckeyes

Quarter	1	2	3	4	Total
Purdue	0	0	0	0	0
Ohio St	29	10	7	0	46

at Ohio Stadium • Columbus, Ohio

- Date: October 8
- Game attendance: 87,707

Game information
- OSU (12:49) - Guess 65 yard interception return (Janakievski kick)
- OSU (7:49) - Payton 1 yard run (Janakievski kick)
- OSU (5:00) - Payton 1 yard run (Janakievski kick)
- OSU (2:16) - Payton 10 yard run (Janakievski kick)
- OSU (7:58) - Springs 66 yard run (Janakievski kick)
- OSU (7:50) - Payton 2 yard run (Janakievski kick)

Purdue

- Herrmann 11/21, 117 Yds, 2 INT
- M. Brown 17 Rush, 66 Yds
- Arnold 3 Rec, 60 Yds

Ohio St

- Gerald 3/6, 90 Yds, INT
- Springs 10 Rush, 151 Yds, TD
- H. Jones 1 Rec, 45 Yds

=== Iowa ===
Team	1	2	3	4	Total
• Ohio St	3	10	7	7	27
Iowa	0	0	0	6	6

- Date: October 15
- Location: Kinnick Stadium
- Game attendance: 60,070

=== At Northwestern ===
#4 Ohio State Buckeyes at Northwestern Wildcats

Quarter	1	2	3	4	Total
Ohio St	14	7	7	7	35
Northwestern	3	6	0	6	15

at Dyche Stadium, Evanston, Illinois

- Date: October 22
- Game time: 12:30 p.m. CST
- Game weather: Light rain, 53 °F (12 °C)
- Game attendance: 29,563

Game information

First quarter

- NW – Sam Poulos 44-yard field goal, 9:33. Northwestern 3–0. Drive: 10 plays, 59 yards, 5:00.
- OSU – Joel Payton 4-yard run (Vlade Janakievski kick), 4:58. Ohio St 7–3. Drive: 3 plays, 80 yards, 0:54.
- OSU – Jeff Logan 5-yard run (Vlade Janakievski kick), 1:15. Ohio St 14–3. Drive: 8 plays, 45 yards, 2:17.

Second quarter

- NW – Mike Taylor 33-yard pass from Dana Hemphill (pass failed), 10:10. Ohio St 14–9. Drive: 2 plays, 34 yards, 0:57
- OSU – Joel Payton 1-yard run (Vlade Janakievski kick), 1:57. Ohio St 21–9. Drive: 4 plays, 21 yards, 1:34.

Third quarter

- OSU – Rod Gerald 24-yard run (Vlade Janakievski kick), 10:41. Ohio St 28–9. Drive: 8 plays, 71 yards, 2:18.

Fourth quarter

- OSU – Paul Campbell 1-yard run (Vlade Janakievski kick), 7:40. Ohio St 35–9. Drive: 10 plays, 80 yards, 4:01.
- NW – Harold Gilmore 14-yard run (run failed), 4:40. Ohio St 35–15. Drive: 7 plays, 73 yards, 2:54.

Top passers

- OSU – Rod Gerald – 7/14, 148 yards, 2 INT
- NW – Dana Hemphill – 6/10, 51 yards, TD

Top rushers

- OSU – Ron Springs – 14 rushes, 130 yards
- NW – Harold Gilmore – 23 rushes, 121 yards, TD

Top receivers

- OSU – James Harrell – 2 receptions, 62 yards
- NW – Mike Taylor – 3 receptions, 41 yards, TD

=== Wisconsin ===
Team	1	2	3	4	Total
Wisconsin	0	0	0	0	0
• Ohio St	7	7	14	14	42

- Date: October 29
- Location: Ohio Stadium
- Game attendance: 87,837

=== Illinois ===
Team	1	2	3	4	Total
• Ohio St	0	7	21	7	35
Illinois	0	0	0	0	0

- Date: November 5
- Location: Memorial Stadium • Champaign, Illinois
- Game attendance: 66,973

Scoring summary
2	OHST	Campbell 1-yard run (Janakievski kick)	Ohio St 7-0
3	OHST	Payton 1-yard run (Janakievski kick)	Ohio St 14-0
3	OHST	Springs 15-yard run (Janakievski kick)	Ohio St 21-0
3	OHST	Harrell 5-yard run (Janakievski kick)	Ohio St 28-0
4	OHST	Johnson 15-yard run (Janakievski kick)	Ohio St 35-0

=== Indiana ===
Team	1	2	3	4	Total
Indiana	7	0	0	0	7
• Ohio St	7	0	21	7	35

- Date: November 12
- Location: Ohio Stadium, Columbus, Ohio
- Game attendance: 87,786

Scoring summary
1	IND	Calvin 2 yard pass from Arnett (Freud kick)	IND 7–0
1	OHST	Payton 3 yard run (Janakievski kick)	Tie 7–7
3	OHST	Harrell 29 yard pass from Gerald (Janakievski kick)	OHST 14–7
3	OHST	Gerald 8 yard run (Janakievski kick)	OHST 21–7
3	OHST	Springs 1 yard run (Janakievski kick)	OHST 28–7
4	OHST	Campbell 1 yard run (Janakievski kick)	OHST 35–7

=== Michigan ===
Team	1	2	3	4	Total
Ohio St	3	0	3	0	6
• Michigan	0	7	7	0	14

- Date: November 19
- Location: Michigan Stadium
- Game attendance: 106,024

=== Sugar Bowl ===
Team	1	2	3	4	Total
Ohio St	0	0	0	6	6
• Alabama	0	13	8	14	35

- Date: January 2
- Location: Louisiana Superdome
- Game weather: Indoors (dome)

== Personnel ==
=== Roster ===
1977 Ohio State Buckeyes football team roster
Players
Coaches
Offense

Pos.	#	Name	Class
G	69	Ernest Andria	Jr
TE	82	Ronald Barwig	So
OT	74	Tim Brown	So
OT	76	Tim Burke	Jr
G	63	Scott Burris	So
QB	4	Norman Burrows	Fr
FB	38	Paul Campbell	So
QB	7	Greg Castignola	So
OT	78	Garth Cox	Sr
C	50	James DeLeone	Fr
TB	47	Doug Donley	Fr
G	59	Ernest Epitropoulos	Fr
WR	89	Bryan Ferguson	So
G	65	Keith Ferguson	Fr
G	56	Kenneth Fritz	So
QB	8	Rod Gerald	Jr
WR	11	James Harrell	Sr
TE	24	Charles Hunter	So
TE	87	William Jaco	Jr
RB	21	Ricky Johnson	So
WR	49	Herman Jones	Sr
G	51	Mark Lang	Sr
G	92	Joel Laser	Jr
RB	35	Felix Lee	Fr
FB	34	Jeff Logan (C)	Sr
OT	73	Douglas Mackie	So
G	61	David Medich	Fr
G	64	Nicholas Miller	Fr
TE	99	Jimmy Moore	Jr
RB	43	Calvin Murray	Fr
WR	84	Douglas Pauley	Fr
FB	30	Joel Payton	Fr
OT	77	David Phillips	Fr
C	53	Douglas Porter	Sr
G	70	Joseph Robinson	Jr
G	57	James Savoca	Sr
FB	37	Michael Schneider	So
RB	23	Ron Springs	Jr
TE	80	Grgeory Storer	Sr
QB	6	Michael Strahine	Sr
QB	9	Alvin Taylor	So
C	52	Tim Vogler	Jr
FB	18	Ric Volley	So
OT	79	Chris Ward (C)	Sr
G	58	Thomas Waugh	Jr

Defense

Pos.	#	Name	Class
LB	94	David Adkins	Sr
S	22	Joseph Allegro	Sr
DE	88	David Allen	Fr
MG	93	Terry Bach	Fr
DT	67	Eddie Beamon	Sr
DB	25	Todd Bell	Fr
LB	19	Thomas Blinco	So
MG	55	Aaron Brown (C)	Sr
DB	41	James Caruso	So
DT	71	Byron Cato	Jr
LB	36	Tom Cousineau	Jr
DE	96	Martin Cusick	Sr
DE	32	Kelton Dansler	Jr
DE	86	Joseph Dixon	Sr
DT	60	Gary Dulin	So
DB	27	Ray Ellis	Fr
DB	39	Leon Ellison	Fr
LB	33	John Epitropoulos	Fr
DE	13	Michael Faler	So
S	46	Duncan Griffin	Jr
S	44	Ray Griffin (C)	Sr
DB	12	Mike Guess	So
DT	66	Tyrone Harris	Sr
DT	54	Luther Henson	Fr
DE	83	Joseph Hornik	Jr
MG	98	Wendell Kellum	Jr
DE	5	James Laughlin	So
LB	95	Brian Lewis	Jr
LB	90	Anthony Megaro	Fr
DE	91	Ronald Miller	Fr
DT	62	Ed Mills	So
DB	20	Leonard Mills	Jr
DB	28	Robert Murphy	Fr
DE	16	Paul Ross	Jr
DB	10	Keith Saunders	Sr
MG	68	Tim Sawicki	So
S	14	Brian Schwartz	So
DB	48	Vince Skillings	Fr
DT	72	Mark Sullivan	Jr
LB	97	Terry Vogler	Jr
LB	15	Alvin Washington	Fr

Special teams

Pos.	#	Name	Class
P	3	David Budd	So
K	13	Vlade Janakievski	Fr
K	2	Douglas McEldowney	Fr
P	1	David McKee	Jr
P	19	Thomas Orosz	Fr

Head coach

- Woody Hayes

Coordinators/assistant coaches

- George Chaump – Offense (10th year)
- George Hill – Defensive Coordinator (7th year)
- Dave Adolph – Defense (1st year)
- Alex Gibbs – Offensive Coordinator/ Offensive Line (3rd year)
- Mickey Jackson – (4th year)
- Bill Myles – Offensive Line (1st year)
- Gary Tranquill – Defensive Backs (1st year)

Legend

- (C) Team captain
- (S) Suspended
- (I) Ineligible
- Injured
- Redshirt

Roster
Last update: 2018-Dec-16

=== Depth chart ===
Defense

FS
22 Joe Allegro
14 Brian Schwartz
⋅

WLB	SLB
94 Dave Adkins	36 Tom Cousineau
97 Terry Vogler	29 Tom Blinco
⋅	⋅

SS
44 Ray Griffin
25 Todd Bell
46 Duncan Griffin

CB
12 Mike Guess
45 Vince Skillings
⋅

DE	DT	NT	DT	DE
32 Kelton Dansler	67 Eddie Beamon	55 Aaron Brown	71 Byron Cato	16 Paul Ross
86 Joe Dixon	60 Gary Dulin	72 Mark Sullivan	54 Luther Henson	5 Jim Laughlin
⋅	⋅	⋅	⋅	⋅

CB
20 Lenny Mills
27 Ray Ellis
⋅

Offense

SE
49 Herman Jones
47 Doug Donley
⋅

LT	LG	C	RG	RT
79 Chris Ward	51 Mark Lang	52 Tim Vogler	56 Ken Fritz	70 Joe Robinson
78 Garth Cox	69 Ernie Andria	53 Doug Porter	58 Tom Waugh	73 Doug Mackie
⋅	⋅	⋅	⋅	⋅

TE
87 Bill Jaco
99 Jimmy Moore
80 Greg Storer

WB
11 Jim Harrell
89 Bryan Ferguson
⋅

QB
8 Rod Gerald
7 Greg Castignola
6 Mike Strahine

FB
38 Paul Campbell
30 Joel Payton
18 Ricardo Volley

Special teams
PK 13 Vlade Janakievski
P 1 Dave McKee

RB
23 Ron Springs
34 Jeff Logan
26 Ricky Johnson

== 1978 NFL draftees ==
Player	Round	Pick	Position	NFL club
Chris Ward	1	4	Tackle	New York Jets
Ray Griffin	2	35	Defensive back	Cincinnati Bengals
Herman Jones	7	185	Wide receiver	Chicago Bears
Jeff Logan	7	191	Running back	Baltimore Colts
David Adkins	8	209	Linebacker	Atlanta Falcons
Aaron C. Brown	10	252	Linebacker	Tampa Bay Buccaneers
