= 1977 Iowa Hawkeyes football team =

American college football season

1977 Iowa Hawkeyes football
- Conference: Big Ten Conference
- Record: 5–6 (3–5 Big Ten)
- Head coach: Bob Commings (4th season)
- Defensive coordinator: Larry Coyer (4th season)
- MVPs: Dean Moore; Rod Sears
- Captains: Jim Hilgenberg; Dean Moore
- Home stadium: Kinnick Stadium

1977 Big Ten Conference football standings
	Conf.					Overall
Team	W		L		T	W		L		T
No. 9 Michigan +	7	–	1	–	0	10	–	2	–	0
No. 11 Ohio State +	7	–	1	–	0	9	–	3	–	0
Michigan State	6	–	1	–	1	7	–	3	–	1
Indiana	4	–	3	–	1	5	–	5	–	1
Minnesota	4	–	4	–	0	7	–	5	–	0
Purdue	3	–	5	–	0	5	–	6	–	0
Iowa	3	–	5	–	0	5	–	6	–	0
Wisconsin	3	–	6	–	0	5	–	6	–	0
Illinois	2	–	6	–	0	3	–	8	–	0
Northwestern	1	–	8	–	0	1	–	10	–	0
+ – Conference co-champions; Rankings from AP Poll

The 1977 Iowa Hawkeyes football team was an American football team that represented the University of Iowa as a member of the Big Ten Conference during the 1977 Big Ten football season. In their fourth year under head coach Bob Commings, the Hawkeyes compiled a 5–6 record (3–5 in conference games), tied for sixth place in the Big Ten, and were outscored by a total of 229 to 171.

The 1977 Hawkeyes gained 1,562 rushing yards and 1,276 passing yards. On defense, they gave up 1,992 rushing yards and 1,500 passing yards. The team's statistical leaders included quarterback Tom McLaughlin (78-of-152 passing for 1,081 yards), running back Jon Lazar (411 rushing yards), Mike Brady (26 receptions for 357 yards), and kicker Dave Holsclaw (39 points scored). Linebacker Tom Rusk set Iowa's single-season record (still intact) with 105 solo tackles during the 1977 season; he also received first-team All-Big Ten honors. Center Jim Hilgenberg and linebacker Dean Moore were the team captains. Moore and defensive back Rod Sears were selected as the team's most valuable players.

The team played its home games at Kinnick Stadium in Iowa City, Iowa. Home attendance totaled 377,410, an average of 53,916 per game.

== Schedule ==
Date	Opponent	Site	TV	Result	Attendance	Source
September 10	Northwestern	Kinnick Stadium; Iowa City, IA		W 24–0	53,725	
September 17	Iowa State*	Kinnick Stadium; Iowa City, IA (rivalry)	ABC	W 12–10	57,988	
September 24	Arizona*	Kinnick Stadium; Iowa City, IA		L 7–41	53,110	
October 1	at UCLA*	Los Angeles Memorial Coliseum; Los Angeles, CA		W 16–34 (forfeited by UCLA)	35,636	
October 8	Minnesota	Kinnick Stadium; Iowa City, IA (rivalry)		W 18–6	57,640	
October 15	No. 5 Ohio State	Kinnick Stadium; Iowa City, IA		L 6–27	60,070	
October 22	at Purdue	Ross–Ade Stadium; West Lafayette, IN	ABC	L 21–34	62,443	
October 29	at No. 6 Michigan	Michigan Stadium; Ann Arbor, MI		L 6–23	104,617	
November 5	Indiana	Kinnick Stadium; Iowa City, IA		L 21–24	49,620	
November 12	at Wisconsin	Camp Randall Stadium; Madison, WI (rivalry)		W 24–8	71,723	
November 19	Michigan State	Kinnick Stadium; Iowa City, IA		L 16–22	43,700	
*Non-conference game; Rankings from AP Poll released prior to the game

== Game summaries ==
=== Northwestern ===
Northwestern at Iowa

Team	1	2	3	4	Total
Wildcats	0	0	0	0	0
• Hawkeyes	0	10	7	7	24

- Date: Saturday, September 10
- Location: Kinnick Stadium, Iowa City, Iowa
- Game attendance: 53,725
- Game weather: 72 °F (22 °C), clear skies, wind NW 15–20 mph (24–32 km/h)
- Source: Box score Archived 2020-01-07 at the Wayback Machine

Scoring summary
2	14:58	IOWA	Arkeilpane 1-yard run (Schilling kick)	IOWA 7-0
2	0:01	IOWA	Schilling 41-yard field goal	IOWA 10-0
3	6:22	IOWA	Lazar 10-yard pass from Commings (Schilling kick)	IOWA 17-0
4	0:49	IOWA	Brady 18-yard pass from Commings (Schilling kick)	IOWA 24-0

=== Iowa State ===
#19 Iowa State at Iowa

Team	1	2	3	4	Total
Cyclones	7	3	0	0	10
• Hawkeyes	12	0	0	0	12

- Date: Saturday, September 17
- Location: Kinnick Stadium, Iowa City, Iowa
- Game attendance: 59,725
- Game weather: ~75 °F (24 °C), Overcast, Wind S 15–20 mph (24–32 km/h)
- TV announcers (ABC): Ara Parseghian
- Source: Box score Archived 2020-01-07 at the Wayback Machine

Scoring summary
1	ISU	Buck 63 yard punt return (Kollman kick)	ISU 7-0
1	IOWA	Mosely 77 yard run (kick failed)	ISU 7-6
1	IOWA	Lazar 10 yard run (run failed)	IOWA 12-7
2	ISU	Kollman 42 yard field goal	IOWA 12-10

=== Minnesota ===
Team	1	2	3	4	Total
Golden Gophers	0	0	0	6	6
• Hawkeyes	0	6	9	3	18

- Date: October 8
- Location: Kinnick Stadium, Iowa City, Iowa
- Game attendance: 57,640
- Game weather: 48 °F (9 °C), Cloudy, Wind NW 15–20 mph (24–32 km/h)

=== Ohio State ===
Team	1	2	3	4	Total
• Buckeyes	3	10	7	7	27
Hawkeyes	0	0	0	6	6

- Date: October 15
- Location: Kinnick Stadium, Iowa City, Iowa
- Game attendance: 60,070

=== At Michigan ===
Iowa at Michigan

Team	1	2	3	4	Total
Hawkeyes	0	0	0	6	6
• No. 6 Wolverines	7	7	7	2	23

- Date: October 29
- Location: Michigan Stadium • Ann Arbor, Michigan
- Game attendance: 104,617

Scoring summary
1	MICH	R. Davis 63-yard pass from Leach (Willner kick)	Michigan 7-0
2	MICH	G. Johnson 6-yard pass from Leach (Willner kick)	Michigan 14-0
3	MICH	White 32-yard pass from Leach (Willner kick)	Michigan 21-0
4	IOWA	McLaughlin 1-yard run (run failed)	Michigan 21-6
4	MICH	Safety, McLaughlin tackled in end zone	Michigan 23-6

=== At Wisconsin ===
Iowa's 24–8 triumph in Madison started an 18–game unbeaten streak (17–0–1) against the Badgers.

=== Michigan State ===
Michigan State at Iowa

Team	1	2	3	4	Total
• Spartans	17	0	3	2	22
Hawkeyes	0	10	3	3	16

- Date: Saturday, September 19
- Location: Kinnick Stadium, Iowa City, Iowa
- Game attendance: 43,700
- Source: Game recap

Scoring summary
1		MSU	Steve Smith 10-yard run (Nielsen kick)	MSU 7-0
1		MSU	Earley 2-yard pass from Smith (Nielsen kick)	MSU 14-0
1		MSU	Nielsen 45-yard field goal	MSU 17-0
2		IOWA	Jim Swift 25-yard pass from Tom McLaughlin (Holsclaw kick)	MSU 17-7
2		IOWA	Holsclaw 47-yard field goal	MSU 17-10
3		MSU	Nielsen 19-yard field goal	MSU 20-10
3		IOWA	Holsclaw 48-yard field goal	MSU 20-13
4	12:14	IOWA	Holsclaw 51-yard field goal	MSU 20-16
4		MSU	Safety	MSU 22-16

== Roster ==
1977 Iowa Hawkeyes football team roster
Players
Coaches
Offense

Pos.	#	Name	Class
RB		James Arkeilpane
G	61	Doug Benschoter
WR	88	Mike Brady
QB		Bobby Commings Jr.	Fr
RB	28	Jesse Cook	Sr
OL		Rich Cunningham
TE		Doug Dunham
WR		Jim Frazier
QB		Jeff Green
C	54	Jay Hilgenberg	Fr
G	56	Jim Hilgenberg
RB	31	Joe Hufford
FB	44	Jon Lazar	Jr
WR		Chris Mackey
OL		Mike Mayer
RB		Dean McKillip
QB	11	Tom McLaughlin	Sr
RB		Rod Morton	So
RB	18	Dennis Mosley	So
OL		Sam Palladino
QB		Doug Piro
WR		Brad Reid	So
RB		Tom Renn
RB	37	Ernie Sheeler	Sr
TE		Jim Swift	So
RB		John Thomas
OT	72	Barry Tomasetti	Sr

Defense

Pos.	#	Name	Class
S	9	Dave Becker
DB		Shanty Burks
DB		Charles Danzy
DL		John Harty
DL		Darrell Hobbs
DL		Joe Hufford
LB	43	Mike Jackson
DL		Mark Mahmens
DL	83	Jim Molini	So
LB	85	Dean Moore	Sr
LB	47	Tom Rusk	Jr
CB	19	Rod Sears	Sr
DB		Cedric Shaw
DB		Chuck Sodergren
CB	38	Roger Stech
DE	45	Steve Vazquez	Jr
LB		Leven Weiss

Special teams

Pos.	#	Name	Class
K, P		Dave Holsclaw	So
K		Scott Schilling	Fr

Head coach

- Bob Commings

Coordinators/assistant coaches

- Jim Caldwell (GA)
- Larry Coyer (DC)
- Tom Hayes (DB)
- Dan McCarney (GA)

Legend

- (C) Team captain
- (S) Suspended
- (I) Ineligible
- Injured
- Redshirt

Roster
Last update: 2021-Jan-03

1977 Iowa Hawkeyes football team roster
Players
Coaches
Offense

Pos.	#	Name	Class
RB		James Arkeilpane
G	61	Doug Benschoter
WR	88	Mike Brady
QB		Bobby Commings Jr.	Fr
RB	28	Jesse Cook	Sr
OL		Rich Cunningham
TE		Doug Dunham
WR		Jim Frazier
QB		Jeff Green
C	54	Jay Hilgenberg	Fr
G	56	Jim Hilgenberg
RB	31	Joe Hufford
FB	44	Jon Lazar	Jr
WR		Chris Mackey
OL		Mike Mayer
RB		Dean McKillip
QB	11	Tom McLaughlin	Sr
RB		Rod Morton	So
RB	18	Dennis Mosley	So
OL		Sam Palladino
QB		Doug Piro
WR		Brad Reid	So
RB		Tom Renn
RB	37	Ernie Sheeler	Sr
TE		Jim Swift	So
RB		John Thomas
OT	72	Barry Tomasetti	Sr

Defense

Pos.	#	Name	Class
S	9	Dave Becker
DB		Shanty Burks
DB		Charles Danzy
DL		John Harty
DL		Darrell Hobbs
DL		Joe Hufford
LB	43	Mike Jackson
DL		Mark Mahmens
DL	83	Jim Molini	So
LB	85	Dean Moore	Sr
LB	47	Tom Rusk	Jr
CB	19	Rod Sears	Sr
DB		Cedric Shaw
DB		Chuck Sodergren
CB	38	Roger Stech
DE	45	Steve Vazquez	Jr
LB		Leven Weiss

Special teams

Pos.	#	Name	Class
K, P		Dave Holsclaw	So
K		Scott Schilling	Fr

Head coach

- Bob Commings

Coordinators/assistant coaches

- Jim Caldwell (GA)
- Larry Coyer (DC)
- Tom Hayes (DB)
- Dan McCarney (GA)

Legend

- (C) Team captain
- (S) Suspended
- (I) Ineligible
- Injured
- Redshirt

Roster
Last update: 2021-Jan-03
