= 1977 Minnesota Golden Gophers football team =

American college football season

1977 Minnesota Golden Gophers football

Hall of Fame Classic, L 7–17 vs. Maryland
- Conference: Big Ten Conference
- Record: 7–5 (4–4 Big Ten)
- Head coach: Cal Stoll (6th season)
- MVP: Steve Midboe
- Captain: Steve Midboe
- Home stadium: Memorial Stadium

1977 Big Ten Conference football standings
	Conf.					Overall
Team	W		L		T	W		L		T
No. 9 Michigan +	7	–	1	–	0	10	–	2	–	0
No. 11 Ohio State +	7	–	1	–	0	9	–	3	–	0
Michigan State	6	–	1	–	1	7	–	3	–	1
Indiana	4	–	3	–	1	5	–	5	–	1
Minnesota	4	–	4	–	0	7	–	5	–	0
Purdue	3	–	5	–	0	5	–	6	–	0
Iowa	3	–	5	–	0	5	–	6	–	0
Wisconsin	3	–	6	–	0	5	–	6	–	0
Illinois	2	–	6	–	0	3	–	8	–	0
Northwestern	1	–	8	–	0	1	–	10	–	0
+ – Conference co-champions; Rankings from AP Poll

The 1977 Minnesota Golden Gophers football team represented the University of Minnesota in the 1977 Big Ten Conference football season. In their sixth year under head coach Cal Stoll, the Golden Gophers compiled a 7–5 record but were outscored by their opponents by a combined total of 180 to 171.

Steve Midboe received the team's Most Valuable Player award. Kicker Paul Rogind and defensive tackle Steve Midboe were named All-Big Ten first team. Defensive tackle Mark Merrill, center Mark Slater and defensive back Bobby Weber were named All-Big Ten second team. Offensive lineman Dennis Fitzpatrick, offensive lineman Bryson Hollimon, defensive lineman Stan Sytsma and corner back Bob Weber were named Academic All-Big Ten.

Total attendance for the season was 247,118, which averaged to 35,302. The season high for attendance was against rival Michigan.

== Schedule ==
Date	Opponent	Rank	Site	Result	Attendance	Source
September 10	Western Michigan*		Memorial Stadium; Minneapolis, MN	W 10–7	29,619	
September 17	at No. 6 Ohio State		Ohio Stadium; Columbus, OH	L 7–38	87,799	
September 24	No. 18 UCLA*		Memorial Stadium; Minneapolis, MN	W 27–13	41,076	
October 1	Washington*		Memorial Stadium; Minneapolis, MN	W 19–17	31,895	
October 8	at Iowa		Kinnick Stadium; Iowa City, IA (rivalry)	L 6–18	57,640	
October 15	Northwestern^{†}		Memorial Stadium; Minneapolis, MN	W 13–7	39,021	
October 22	No. 1 Michigan		Memorial Stadium; Minneapolis, MN (Little Brown Jug)	W 16–0	44,165	
October 29	at Indiana	No. 19	Memorial Stadium; Bloomington, IN	L 22–34	30,399	
November 5	Michigan State		Memorial Stadium; Minneapolis, MN	L 10–29	30,600	
November 12	at Illinois		Memorial Stadium; Champaign, IL	W 21–0	37,697	
November 19	Wisconsin		Memorial Stadium; Minneapolis, MN (rivalry)	W 13–7	30,742	
December 22	vs. Maryland		Legion Field; Birmingham, AL (Hall of Fame Classic)	L 7–17	47,000	
*Non-conference game; ^{†}Homecoming; Rankings from AP Poll released prior to the game

== Roster ==
1977 Minnesota Golden Gophers football team roster
Players
Coaches
Offense

Pos.	#	Name	Class
WR	86	Jeff Anhorn	So
WR		Roger Artis
QB		Wendell Avery
WR	20	Elmer Bailey	So
RB		Marion Barber	Fr
TE		Glenn Bourquin	So
RB	31	Steven Breault	Jr
WR	2	Elwin Burditte	So
C	55	Chris Engel	Jr
TE		Jim Fahnhorst
OT		Dennis Fitzpatrick
G		Thomas Fitzpatrick
G		Bryson Hollimon
FB	44	Kent Kitzmann	So
OT		Jeff Morrow
OT	63	Greg Murtha	So
WR		Dana Noel	Fr
G	52	Darrell Schwen	So
C	53	Mark Slater	Sr
OT	68	Martin Stein	So
QB	18	Marc Trestman	Jr
FB	48	Jeff Thompson	So
FB		Garry White	Fr
OT	55	Ken Wypyszynski	So

Defense

Pos.	#	Name	Class
DT	99	John Abrahamson	Sr
DT	95	Alan Blanshan	So
S	34	Keith Brown	Jr
LB	36	Edward Burns	Jr
CB		Ray Dilulo
S	11	Keith Edwards	So
CB	17	Kenneth Foxworth	So
NG	65	Doug Friberg	Jr
CB	8	John Hoffman	So
LB	84	Michael Hunt	Sr
S		Craig Kirtland
NG	92	John Kuduk	Jr
CB		Thomas Luckemeyer
DE	88	Mark Merrill	Sr
LB		Donald Meyer
DT	78	Steve Midboe	Sr
DT		James Ronan
S		Brian Snyder
LB	97	Steve Stewart	Sr
DE	5	Stan Sytsma	Jr
CB	28	Bobby Weber	Sr
DE		Desirray Williamson	Sr

Special teams

Pos.	#	Name	Class
K		Paul Rogind	So
P		J. Terrence Simmons

Head coach

- Cal Stoll

Coordinators/assistant coaches

- Tim Burke (assistant)

Legend

- (C) Team captain
- (S) Suspended
- (I) Ineligible
- Injured
- Redshirt

Roster

== Game summaries ==
=== Michigan ===
Team	1	2	3	4	Total
Michigan	0	0	0	0	0
• Minnesota	10	3	0	3	16

- Date: October 22
- Location: Memorial Stadium, Minneapolis, MN
- Game attendance: 44,165

Scoring summary
1	4:28	MINN	Rogind 41-yard field goal	MINN 3-0
1	8:35	MINN	Barber 3-yard run (Rogind kick)	MINN 10-0
2		MINN	Rogind 37-yard field goal	MINN 13-0
4		MINN	Rogind 32-yard field goal	MINN 16-0
