= 1977 Indiana Hoosiers football team =

American college football season

1977 Indiana Hoosiers football
- Conference: Big Ten Conference
- Record: 5–5–1 (4–3–1 Big Ten)
- Head coach: Lee Corso (5th season)
- MVP: Joe Norman
- Captains: Scott Arnett; Tim McVay; Joe Norman; Charley Peal
- Home stadium: Memorial Stadium

1977 Big Ten Conference football standings
	Conf.					Overall
Team	W		L		T	W		L		T
No. 9 Michigan +	7	–	1	–	0	10	–	2	–	0
No. 11 Ohio State +	7	–	1	–	0	9	–	3	–	0
Michigan State	6	–	1	–	1	7	–	3	–	1
Indiana	4	–	3	–	1	5	–	5	–	1
Minnesota	4	–	4	–	0	7	–	5	–	0
Purdue	3	–	5	–	0	5	–	6	–	0
Iowa	3	–	5	–	0	5	–	6	–	0
Wisconsin	3	–	6	–	0	5	–	6	–	0
Illinois	2	–	6	–	0	3	–	8	–	0
Northwestern	1	–	8	–	0	1	–	10	–	0
+ – Conference co-champions; Rankings from AP Poll

The 1977 Indiana Hoosiers football team represented the Indiana Hoosiers in the 1977 Big Ten Conference football season. They participated as members of the Big Ten Conference. The Hoosiers played their home games at Memorial Stadium in Bloomington, Indiana. The team was coached by Lee Corso, in his fifth year as head coach of the Hoosiers.

== Schedule ==
Date	Opponent	Site	Result	Attendance	Source
September 10	Wisconsin	Memorial Stadium; Bloomington, IN	L 14–30	34,755	
September 17	LSU*	Memorial Stadium; Bloomington, IN	W 24–21	30,067	
September 24	Miami (OH)*	Memorial Stadium; Bloomington, IN	L 20–21	28,732	
October 1	at No. 11 Nebraska*	Memorial Stadium; Lincoln, NE	L 13–31	76,034	
October 8	at Northwestern	Dyche Stadium; Evanston, IL	W 28–3	16,378	
October 15	Michigan State^{†}	Memorial Stadium; Bloomington, IN (rivalry)	T 13–13	36,892	
October 22	at Illinois	Memorial Stadium; Champaign, IL (rivalry)	L 7–21	50,298	
October 29	No. 19 Minnesota	Memorial Stadium; Bloomington, IN	W 34–22	30,399	
November 5	at Iowa	Kinnick Stadium; Iowa City, IA	W 24–21	49,620	
November 12	at No. 4 Ohio State	Ohio Stadium; Columbus, OH	L 7–35	87,786	
November 19	Purdue	Memorial Stadium; Bloomington, IN (Old Oaken Bucket)	W 21–10	52,914	
*Non-conference game; ^{†}Homecoming; Rankings from AP Poll released prior to the game

== Roster ==
1977 Indiana Hoosiers football team roster
Players
Coaches
Offense

Pos.	#	Name	Class
OT	73	Gerhard Ahting	Fr
QB	14	Tim Clifford	Fr
WR	88	Mike Friede	So
C	50	Mark Heidel	Jr
G	64	Mark Johnson	So

Defense

Pos.	#	Name	Class
LB	35	Joe Norman	Jr

Special teams

Pos.	#	Name	Class

Head coach

- Lee Corso

Coordinators/assistant coaches

Legend

- (C) Team captain
- (S) Suspended
- (I) Ineligible
- Injured
- Redshirt

== 1978 NFL draftees ==
Player	Position	Round	Pick	NFL club
Charles Peal	Defensive tackle	10	273	Los Angeles Rams
