= Kent Kitzmann =

American football player

Profile
- Position: Fullback

Career information
- High school: John Marshall (Rochester, Minnesota)
- College: Minnesota (1975–1978)

Kent Kitzmann is a former fullback with the Minnesota Golden Gophers from 1975 to 1978. Kitzmann starred as a running back at Rochester John Marshall in High School, leading the Rockets to the Class AA state football championships in both 1973 and 1974. He also excelled in the shot put, heaving one of the longest throws in state high school history while as a senior at John Marshall in 1975. He was recruited to Minnesota to play for Cal Stoll and in 1976 and 1977 he led the Gophers in rushing both years. Kitzmann's finest hour on the gridiron came in a game against Illinois in 1977 at Champaign's Memorial Stadium. When he carried the ball a Big Ten record 57 times for an astounding 266 yards in a 21–0 victory over the Illini, helping the Gophers to virtually secure their first bowl invitation in fifteen years.
