= 1977 Michigan State Spartans football team =

American college football season

1977 Michigan State Spartans football
- Conference: Big Ten Conference
- Record: 7–3–1 (6–1–1 Big Ten)
- Head coach: Darryl Rogers (2nd season)
- Defensive coordinator: Bob Padilla (2nd season)
- MVP: Larry Bethea
- Captains: Larry Bethea; Al Pitts; Paul Rudzinski
- Home stadium: Spartan Stadium

1977 Big Ten Conference football standings
	Conf.					Overall
Team	W		L		T	W		L		T
No. 9 Michigan +	7	–	1	–	0	10	–	2	–	0
No. 11 Ohio State +	7	–	1	–	0	9	–	3	–	0
Michigan State	6	–	1	–	1	7	–	3	–	1
Indiana	4	–	3	–	1	5	–	5	–	1
Minnesota	4	–	4	–	0	7	–	5	–	0
Purdue	3	–	5	–	0	5	–	6	–	0
Iowa	3	–	5	–	0	5	–	6	–	0
Wisconsin	3	–	6	–	0	5	–	6	–	0
Illinois	2	–	6	–	0	3	–	8	–	0
Northwestern	1	–	8	–	0	1	–	10	–	0
+ – Conference co-champions; Rankings from AP Poll

The 1977 Michigan State Spartans football team was an American football team that represented Michigan State University as a member of the Big Ten Conference during the 1977 Big Ten football season. In their second season under head coach Darryl Rogers, the Spartans compiled a 7–3–1 record (6–1–1 in conference games), finished third in the Big Ten, and outscored opponents by a total of 258 to 162. In two games against ranked opponents, they lost to No. 14 Notre Dame and No. 3 Michigan.

On offense, the Spartans gained an average of 197.1 rushing yards and 170.6 passing yards per game. On defense, they gave up 165.3 rushing yards and 160.5 passing yards per game. The individual statistical leaders included quarterback Ed Smith with 1,731 passing yards, Leroy McGee with 720 rushing yards, and flanker Kirk Gibson with 531 receiving yards and 24.1 yards per reception(tops in the Big Ten).

Eight Spartans were selected by either the Associated Press (AP) or the United Press International (UPI) for the 1977 All-Big Ten Conference football teams: defensive tackle Larry Bethea (AP-1, UPI-1); punter Ray Stachowicz (AP-1, UPI-1); center Al Pitts (AP-2, UPI-1); placekicker Hans Nielsen (UPI-1); defensive back Mark Anderson (AP-2, UPI-2); wide receiver Kirk Gibson (UPI-2); tight end Mark Brammer (UPI-2); and linebacker Paul Rudzinski (UPI-2). Bethea was selected as the team's most valuable player.

The team played its home games at Spartan Stadium in East Lansing, Michigan.

== Schedule ==
Date	Opponent	Site	Result	Attendance	Source
September 10	Purdue	Spartan Stadium; East Lansing, MI	W 19–14	53,014	
September 17	Washington State*	Spartan Stadium; East Lansing, MI	L 21–23	50,263	
September 24	Wyoming*	Spartan Stadium; East Lansing, MI	W 34–16	56,214	
October 1	at No. 14 Notre Dame*	Notre Dame Stadium; Notre Dame, IN (rivalry)	L 6–16	59,075	
October 8	No. 3 Michigan	Spartan Stadium; East Lansing, MI (rivalry)	L 14–24	78,183	
October 15	at Indiana	Memorial Stadium; Bloomington, IN (rivalry)	T 13–13	36,892	
October 22	at Wisconsin	Camp Randall Stadium; Madison, WI	W 9–7	79,203	
October 29	Illinois^{†}	Spartan Stadium; East Lansing, MI	W 49–20	70,589	
November 5	at Minnesota	Memorial Stadium; Minneapolis, MN	W 29–10	30,600	
November 11	Northwestern	Spartan Stadium; East Lansing, MI	W 44–3	61,238	
November 19	at Iowa	Kinnick Stadium; Iowa City, IA	W 22–16	43,700	
*Non-conference game; ^{†}Homecoming; Rankings from AP Poll released prior to the game

== Game summaries ==
=== Michigan ===
Team	1	2	3	4	Total
• Michigan	0	10	14	0	24
Michigan St	0	7	0	7	14

- Date: October 8
- Location: Spartan Stadium, East Lansing, MI
- Game attendance: 78,183

Scoring summary
Q2	MSU	Gibson 19 yard pass from Smith (Nielsen kick)	MSU 7–0
Q2	MICH	White 12 yard pass from Leach (Willner kick)	Tie 7–7
Q2	MICH	Willner 50 yard field goal	MICH 10–7
Q3	MICH	R. Davis 3 yard run (Willner kick)	MICH 17–7
Q3	MICH	Leach 3 yard run (Willner kick)	MICH 24–7
Q4	MSU	Earley 11 yard run (Nielsen kick)	MICH 24–14

On October 8, 1977, Michigan State lost to Michigan, 24–14, at Spartan Stadium. Michigan State took a 7–0 lead on a 19-yard touchdown pass from Ed Smith to Kirk Gibson. Michigan responded with a 12-yard touchdown pass from Rick Leach to White and a 50-yard field goal to take a 10–7 lead at halftime. Michigan extended its lead to 24–7 in the third quarter on touchdown runs by Russell Davis and Ed Leach. Harlan Huckleby rushed for 146 yards, and Russell Davis added 96 yards. Ralph Clayton caught three passes for 99 yards. Michigan completed four of 10 passes in the game and threw only one pass in the second half.

== Roster ==
1977 Michigan State Spartans football team roster
Players
Coaches
Offense

Pos.	#	Name	Class
TE	91	Mark Brammer	So
RB		Jim Earley	Sr
WR	23	Kirk Gibson	Jr

Defense

Pos.	#	Name	Class
DB	16	Mark Anderson	So
DT	88	Larry Bethea	Sr
LB	49	Dan Bass	So
LB	37	Paul Rudzinski	Sr
LB	57	Larry Savage	So

Special teams

Pos.	#	Name	Class
K	3	Tom Birney	Sr

Head coach

- Darryl Rogers

Coordinators/assistant coaches

Legend

- (C) Team captain
- (S) Suspended
- (I) Ineligible
- Injured
- Redshirt
