= Dan McCarney =

American football player and coach (born 1953)

Biographical details
- Born: July 28, 1953 (age 73); Iowa City, Iowa, U.S.

Playing career
- 1972–1974: Iowa
- Position: Offensive lineman

Coaching career (HC unless noted)
- 1977–1978: Iowa (GA)
- 1979–1989: Iowa (DL)
- 1990–1994: Wisconsin (DC/DL)
- 1995–2006: Iowa State
- 2007: South Florida (AHC/DL)
- 2008–2010: Florida (AHC/DL)
- 2011–2015: North Texas

Head coaching record
- Overall: 78–117
- Bowls: 3–3

Accomplishments and honors

Championships
- 1 Big 12 North Division (2004)

Patrick Daniel McCarney (born July 28, 1953) is an American former college football coach. He served as the head football coach at Iowa State University from 1995 to 2006 and the University of North Texas from 2011 to 2015, compiling a career head coaching record of 78–117.

== Playing career ==
McCarney played football at Iowa City High School, and was an offensive lineman at the University of Iowa from 1972 to 1974 and was named team captain in 1974.

== Coaching career ==
=== Iowa ===
McCarney returned to Iowa as a graduate assistant from 1977 to 1978 under Bob Commings. When Hayden Fry arrived at Iowa in 1979, he named McCarney as defensive line coach, a post he held for 10 years—during which Iowa made two appearances in the Rose Bowl.

=== Wisconsin ===
McCarney served as the defensive coordinator and defensive line coach at the University of Wisconsin–Madison under Barry Alvarez from 1990 to 1994.

=== Iowa State ===
McCarney served as head coach at Iowa State University from 1995 to 2006. His contract was reduced when it was found that his estranged wife had disclosed allegations of abuse by McCarney in a restraining order filed against him in 1994; he admitted to several verbal arguments but only one that became physical as the team elected to keep him a yearly basis (no criminal charges were filed). During that span, McCarney led the Cyclones to five bowl games; the program had been to only three bowl games in their entire history before his arrival. It was he who played a key force in shifting the colors of the team to add blue to a previous color scheme that favored gold and cardinal red; the blue was removed in a uniform and logo revamp in 2008. In their first bowl appearance under McCarney, the 2000 Insight.com Bowl, the Cyclones notched their first bowl win in school history. McCarney guided the Cyclones to be co-champions of the Big 12 North Division during the 2004 season, which led to him earning Big 12 Coach of the Year honors from The Kansas City Star and espn.com. His 56 wins were the most in program history until he was passed by Matt Campbell. He went 6-5 against in-state rival Iowa, including five straight wins from 1998 to 2002 to win their first games against Iowa since 1982.

The 2006 team won three of its first ten games, with seven straight losses to Division I teams by an average of 20 points. On November 8, 2006, he announced his resignation. At the time, he was the longest tenured head football coach in the Big 12 Conference. In 2016, he was inducted into the Iowa State Hall of Fame.

=== South Florida ===
In February 2007, McCarney accepted a position as the defensive line coach and assistant head coach at the University of South Florida.

=== Florida ===
The next year, McCarney accepted the same position at the University of Florida. He coached the defensive line at Florida for two years, including the 2008 NCAA National Championship team. During his tenure, the Gators produced NFL draft picks Carlos Dunlap and Jermaine Cunningham.

=== North Texas ===
In November 2010, McCarney was offered and accepted the position of head coach at the University of North Texas.

At North Texas, McCarney inherited a team that had endured six consecutive losing seasons, and had not won more than three games in any of those seasons. He won five games his first season, and four the next season; then, in 2013, led the Mean Green to their first winning season since 2004.

In 2013, McCarney led the Mean Green to its third bowl win, posting a 36–14 win over UNLV in the Heart of Dallas Bowl.

McCarney was unable to duplicate his 2013 success in 2014, as the North Texas football team posted a 4–8 record. In October 2015, following a loss to Portland State University, McCarney was fired. The loss had dropped the Mean Green to an 0–5 record to open the 2015 season.

Despite having an overall losing record at North Texas, McCarney managed some highlights in addition to the school's third of three all-time bowl wins. In 2011, he led the Mean Green to its first win over a Big Ten Conference opponent with a 24–21 victory against Indiana. The win was also the school's first at their new stadium, Apogee Stadium, which had opened that year.

The 2011 team set a record for home attendance, drawing 113,186 fans to six games.

His 2013 bowl winning team's nine wins were the most since 2004. To that point, it was only the fifth nine-win season in North Texas football history. The other nine win seasons occurred in 2004, 1978, 1977, and 1959. As North Texas State University, the Eagles had their only 10 win season in 1947.

In 2014, McCarney led North Texas to the most lopsided win in the school's history versus Dallas–Fort Worth metroplex rival SMU, 43–6. To that point, the win was only the fifth by North Texas versus SMU against 28 losses and a tie.

On October 10, 2015, McCarney was fired following a 66–7 loss to Portland State of the NCAA Division I Football Championship Subdivision (FCS). The 59-point margin is the biggest win by an FCS over an NCAA Division I Football Bowl Subdivision (FBS) team since NCAA Division I football was divided into subdivisions in 1978.

== Head coaching record ==
Year	Team	Overall	Conference	Standing	Bowl/playoffs	Coaches^{#}	AP^{°}
Iowa State Cyclones (Big Eight Conference) (1995)
1995	Iowa State	3–8	1–6	T–7th			
Iowa State Cyclones (Big 12 Conference) (1996–2006)
1996	Iowa State	2–9	1–7	6th North			
1997	Iowa State	1–10	1–7	6th North			
1998	Iowa State	3–8	1–7	T–5th North			
1999	Iowa State	4–7	1–7	T–5th North			
2000	Iowa State	9–3	5–3	3rd North	W Insight.com	23	25
2001	Iowa State	7–5	4–4	3rd North	L Independence		
2002	Iowa State	7–7	4–4	3rd North	L Humanitarian		
2003	Iowa State	2–10	0–8	6th North			
2004	Iowa State	7–5	4–4	T–1st North	W Independence		
2005	Iowa State	7–5	4–4	T–2nd North	L Houston		
2006	Iowa State	4–8	1–7	6th North			
Iowa State:		56–85	27–68				
North Texas Mean Green (Sun Belt Conference) (2011–2012)
2011	North Texas	5–7	4–4	5th			
2012	North Texas	4–8	3–5	T–6th			
North Texas Mean Green (Conference USA) (2013–2015)
2013	North Texas	9–4	6–2	T–2nd (West)	W Heart of Dallas		
2014	North Texas	4–8	2–6	5th (West)			
2015	North Texas	0–5 (Note: McCarney was fired after the first five games of the 2015 season. Mike Canales was appointed interim head coach and led the team for the final seven games of the season. North Texas finished the year with an overall record of 1–11 and a mark of 1–7 in conference play, placing last out of six teams in Conference USA's West Division.)	0–2				
North Texas:		22–32	15–19				
Total:		78–117					
National championship Conference title Conference division title or championship game berth
^{#}Rankings from final Coaches Poll.; ^{°}Rankings from final AP Poll.
