= 1977 Northwestern Wildcats football team =

American college football season

1977 Northwestern Wildcats football
- Conference: Big Ten Conference
- Record: 1–10 (1–8 Big Ten)
- Head coach: John Pont (5th season)
- Captain: Paul Maly
- Home stadium: Dyche Stadium

1977 Big Ten Conference football standings
	Conf.					Overall
Team	W		L		T	W		L		T
No. 9 Michigan +	7	–	1	–	0	10	–	2	–	0
No. 11 Ohio State +	7	–	1	–	0	9	–	3	–	0
Michigan State	6	–	1	–	1	7	–	3	–	1
Indiana	4	–	3	–	1	5	–	5	–	1
Minnesota	4	–	4	–	0	7	–	5	–	0
Purdue	3	–	5	–	0	5	–	6	–	0
Iowa	3	–	5	–	0	5	–	6	–	0
Wisconsin	3	–	6	–	0	5	–	6	–	0
Illinois	2	–	6	–	0	3	–	8	–	0
Northwestern	1	–	8	–	0	1	–	10	–	0
+ – Conference co-champions; Rankings from AP Poll

The 1977 Northwestern Wildcats team represented Northwestern University during the 1977 Big Ten Conference football season. In their fifth year under head coach John Pont, the Wildcats compiled a 1–10 record (1–8 against Big Ten Conference opponents) and finished in last place in the Big Ten Conference.

The team's offensive leaders were quarterback Scott Stranski with 541 passing yards, Dave Mishler with 520 rushing yards, and Mark Bailey with 347 receiving yards.

== Schedule ==
Date	Opponent	Site	Result	Attendance	Source
September 10	at Iowa	Kinnick Stadium; Iowa City, IA	L 0–24	53,725	
September 17	at Arizona State*	Sun Devil Stadium; Tempe, AZ	L 3–35	57,149	
September 24	North Carolina*	Dyche Stadium; Evanston, IL	L 7–41	19,597	
October 1	at Wisconsin	Camp Randall Stadium; Madison, WI	L 7–19	68,709	
October 8	Indiana	Dyche Stadium; Evanston, IL	L 3–28	16,378	
October 15	at Minnesota	Memorial Stadium; Minneapolis, MN	L 7–13	39,021	
October 22	No. 4 Ohio State	Dyche Stadium; Evanston, IL	L 15–35	29,563	
October 29	Purdue	Dyche Stadium; Evanston, IL	L 16–28	17,525	
November 5	at No. 6 Michigan	Michigan Stadium; Ann Arbor, MI (rivalry)	L 20–63	103,211	
November 12	at Michigan State	Spartan Stadium; East Lansing, MI	L 3–44	61,238	
November 19	Illinois	Dyche Stadium; Evanston, IL (rivalry)	W 21–7	17,255	
*Non-conference game; Rankings from AP Poll released prior to the game

== Roster ==
1977 Northwestern Wildcats football team roster
Players
Coaches
Offense

Pos.	#	Name	Class
OT	68	Tony Ardizzone	Sr
WR	83	Mark Bailey
QB	15	Steve Breitbell	Jr
TE	87	Dan Cleary
QB	17	Bill Dierberger	Fr
C	57	Mike Fielder	So
FB		Harold Gilmore
OL	63	Dan Henderson	Sr
OT	72	Don Herzog
RB		Donald Johnson
G	67	Frank Malec
RB	29	Dave Mishler
TE, K	8	Sam Poulos	Jr
C	55	Phil Reitz	So
RB	34	Matt Reitzug
RB	28	Sam Rushing
WR	26	Todd Sheets	So
C	54	Greg Soderberg
QB	11	Scott Stranski	Jr
G	66	Rudi Tanck
WR		Mike Taylor
WR	88	Mike Wagner
QB		Bill Weir

Defense

Pos.	#	Name	Class
DE	98	Kevin Berg
CB	18	Steve Bobowski	Jr
LB	38	Scott Duncan
S	45	Pat Geegan
DE	99	Curt Grelle
FS	2	Dana Hemphill
S	48	Malcolm Hunter
DE	92	Mike Kendzicky
DB	6	Guy Knafelc	Jr
LB	52	Paul Maly (C)
MG	46	Jim Miller
LB	47	Blane Ogilive
DE		Dean Payne
S	7	Stephen Scardina	Sr
LB		Greg Stanley
DL		Marty Szostak
DL		Lodi Vercelli
DT	74	Norm Wells	So
DT	56	Mike Weitzman	Jr

Special teams

Pos.	#	Name	Class

Head coach

- John Pont

Coordinators/assistant coaches

Legend

- (C) Team captain
- (S) Suspended
- (I) Ineligible
- Injured
- Redshirt

Roster

== Game summaries ==
=== Ohio State ===
#4 Ohio State Buckeyes at Northwestern Wildcats

Quarter	1	2	3	4	Total
Ohio St	14	7	7	7	35
Northwestern	3	6	0	6	15

at Dyche Stadium, Evanston, Illinois

- Date: October 22
- Game time: 1:30 p.m. EDT
- Game weather: Light rain, 53 °F (12 °C)
- Game attendance: 29,563
- Box Score

Game information

First quarter

- NW – Sam Poulos 44-yard field goal, 9:33. Northwestern 3–0. Drive: 10 plays, 59 yards, 5:00.
- OSU – Joel Payton 4-yard run (Vlade Janakievski kick), 4:58. Ohio St 7–3. Drive: 3 plays, 80 yards, 0:54.
- OSU – Jeff Logan 5-yard run (Vlade Janakievski kick), 1:15. Ohio St 14–3. Drive: 8 plays, 45 yards, 2:17.

Second quarter

- NW – Mike Taylor 33-yard pass from Dana Hemphill (pass failed), 10:10. Ohio St 14–9. Drive: 2 plays, 34 yards, 0:57
- OSU – Joel Payton 1-yard run (Vlade Janakievski kick), 1:57. Ohio St 21–9. Drive: 4 plays, 21 yards, 1:34.

Third quarter

- OSU – Rod Gerald 24-yard run (Vlade Janakievski kick), 10:41. Ohio St 28–9. Drive: 8 plays, 71 yards, 2:18.

Fourth quarter

- OSU – Paul Campbell 1-yard run (Vlade Janakievski kick), 7:40. Ohio St 35–9. Drive: 10 plays, 80 yards, 4:01.
- NW – Harold Gilmore 14-yard run (run failed), 4:40. Ohio St 35–15. Drive: 7 plays, 73 yards, 2:54.

Top passers

- OSU – Rod Gerald – 7/14, 148 yards, 2 INT
- NW – Dana Hemphill – 6/10, 51 yards, TD

Top rushers

- OSU – Ron Springs – 14 rushes, 130 yards
- NW – Harold Gilmore – 23 rushes, 121 yards, TD

Top receivers

- OSU – James Harrell – 2 receptions, 62 yards
- NW – Mike Taylor – 3 receptions, 41 yards, TD
