= 1977 Purdue Boilermakers football team =

American college football season

1977 Purdue Boilermakers football
- Conference: Big Ten Conference
- Record: 5–6 (3–5 Big Ten)
- Head coach: Jim Young (1st season)
- Offensive coordinator: John Mackovic (1st season)
- Defensive coordinator: Leon Burtnett (1st season)
- MVP: Fred Arrington
- Captains: Jerome King; John Skibinski
- Home stadium: Ross–Ade Stadium

1977 Big Ten Conference football standings
	Conf.					Overall
Team	W		L		T	W		L		T
No. 9 Michigan +	7	–	1	–	0	10	–	2	–	0
No. 11 Ohio State +	7	–	1	–	0	9	–	3	–	0
Michigan State	6	–	1	–	1	7	–	3	–	1
Indiana	4	–	3	–	1	5	–	5	–	1
Minnesota	4	–	4	–	0	7	–	5	–	0
Purdue	3	–	5	–	0	5	–	6	–	0
Iowa	3	–	5	–	0	5	–	6	–	0
Wisconsin	3	–	6	–	0	5	–	6	–	0
Illinois	2	–	6	–	0	3	–	8	–	0
Northwestern	1	–	8	–	0	1	–	10	–	0
+ – Conference co-champions; Rankings from AP Poll

The 1977 Purdue Boilermakers football team represented Purdue University in the 1977 Big Ten Conference football season. Led by first-year head coach Jim Young, the Boilermakers compiled an overall record of 5–6 with a mark of 3–5 in conference play, tying for sixth place in the Big Ten. Purdue played home games at Ross–Ade Stadium in West Lafayette, Indiana.

== Schedule ==
Date	Opponent	Site	Result	Attendance	Source
September 10	at Michigan State	Spartan Stadium; East Lansing, MI	L 14–19	53,014	
September 17	Ohio*	Ross–Ade Stadium; West Lafayette, IN	W 44–7	49,354	
September 24	No. 11 Notre Dame*	Ross–Ade Stadium; West Lafayette, IN (rivalry)	L 24–31	68,966	
October 1	Wake Forest*	Ross–Ade Stadium; West Lafayette, IN	W 26–17	54,060	
October 8	at No. 4 Ohio State	Ohio Stadium; Columbus, OH	L 0–46	87,707	
October 15	Illinois	Ross–Ade Stadium; West Lafayette, IN (rivalry)	L 22–29	60,242	
October 22	Iowa^{†}	Ross–Ade Stadium; West Lafayette, IN	W 34–21	62,443	
October 29	at Northwestern	Dyche Stadium; Evanston, IL	W 28–16	17,525	
November 5	at Wisconsin	Camp Randall Stadium; Madison, WI	W 22–0	73,322	
November 12	No. 6 Michigan	Ross–Ade Stadium; West Lafayette, IN	L 7–40	68,003	
November 19	at Indiana	Memorial Stadium; Bloomington, IN (Old Oaken Bucket)	L 10–21	52,914	
*Non-conference game; ^{†}Homecoming; Rankings from AP Poll released prior to the game

== Game summaries ==
=== Michigan State ===
- Ray Smith 6 receptions, 108 yards
- Reggie Arnold 7 receptions, 107 yards
- Mark Herrmann's first start at quarterback

=== Ohio ===
- Mark Herrmann 23/36 passing, 339 yards

=== Notre Dame ===
- Mark Herrmann 24/51 passing, 351 yards

=== Northwestern ===
Team	1	2	3	4	Total
• Purdue	14	0	14	0	28
Northwestern	10	0	0	6	16

- Date: October 29
- Location: Dyche Stadium, Evanston, Illinois
- Game attendance: 17,525

Scoring summary
1	PUR	Arnold 12 yard pass from Herrmann (Sovereen kick)	Purdue 7–0
1	PUR	Young 25 yard pass from Herrmann (Sovereen kick)	Purdue 14–0
1	NW	Mishler 69 yard run (Poulos kick)	Purdue 14–7
1	NW	Poulos 28 yard field goal	Purdue 14–10
3	PUR	Skibinski 2 yard run (Sovereen kick)	Purdue 21–10
3	PUR	Young 8 yard pass from Herrmann (Sovereen kick)	Purdue 28–10
4	NW	Reltzug 5 yard run (pass failed)	Purdue 28–16

== Personnel ==
=== Coaching staff ===
Head coach: Jim Young

Assistants: Bob Bockrath, Leon Burtnett, Mike Hankwitz, Randy Hart, John Mackovic, Doug Redmann, Larry Thompson, Ed Zaunbrecher

=== Roster ===
1977 Purdue Boilermakers football team roster
Players
Coaches
Offense

Pos.	#	Name	Class
QB	7	Steve Barr	Jr
WR	87	Bart Burrell	Fr
QB	9	Mark Herrmann	Fr
C	63	Peter Quinn	So
RB	31	John Skibinski	Sr
RB	44	Wayne Smith	So

Defense

Pos.	#	Name	Class
S	10	Mike Adamle	So
LB	48	Fred Arrington	Sr
DE	85	Keena Turner	So

Special teams

Pos.	#	Name	Class
K	8	Scott Sovereen	Jr

Head coach

- Jim Young

Coordinators/assistant coaches

- Leon Burtnett (defensive coordinator)
- Mike Hankwitz
- Randy Hart
- Ed Zaunbrecher

Legend

- (C) Team captain
- (S) Suspended
- (I) Ineligible
- Injured
- Redshirt

=== Starters ===
- Offense: QB Mark Herrmann, TB Mike Brown/Robert Williams, FB John Skibinski, SE Reggie Arnold, FL Ray Smith, TE Dave Young/Tim Eubank, LT Mike Barberich, LG John Fincuan/Dale Schwan, C Pete Quinn/Steve Schlundt, RG Steve McKenzie, RT John LeFeber
- Defense: LDE Lee Larkins, LDT Marcus Jackson/Calvin Clark, NG Roger Ruwe, RDT Jeff Senica, RDE Keena Turner, LB Fred Arrington/Kevin Motts, CB Jerome King/Pat Harris, S Willie Harris/Paul Beery/Rock Supan
- Special teams: K Scott Sovereen, P Dave Eagin

== Awards ==
All-Big Ten

- Reggie Arnold (1st)
- Mark Herrmann (2nd)
- John Skibinski (2nd)

== Statistics ==
=== Passing ===
Player	Comp	Att	Yards	TD	INT
Mark Herrmann	175	319	2,453	18	27

=== Rushing ===
Player	Att	Yards	TD
John Skibinski	147	665	4
Mark Herrmann		-80	

=== Receiving ===
Player	Rec	Yards	TD
Reggie Arnold	44	840	8
John Skibinski		221	
