= 1977 Wisconsin Badgers football team =

American college football season

1977 Wisconsin Badgers football
- Conference: Big Ten Conference
- Record: 5–6 (3–6 Big Ten)
- Head coach: John Jardine (8th season)
- Offensive coordinator: Mike Stock (2nd season)
- Offensive scheme: Multiple T
- Defensive coordinator: Gary Blackney (1st season)
- Base defense: 5–2
- MVP: Dave Crossen
- Captain: Dennis Stejskal
- Home stadium: Camp Randall Stadium

1977 Big Ten Conference football standings
	Conf.					Overall
Team	W		L		T	W		L		T
No. 9 Michigan +	7	–	1	–	0	10	–	2	–	0
No. 11 Ohio State +	7	–	1	–	0	9	–	3	–	0
Michigan State	6	–	1	–	1	7	–	3	–	1
Indiana	4	–	3	–	1	5	–	5	–	1
Minnesota	4	–	4	–	0	7	–	5	–	0
Purdue	3	–	5	–	0	5	–	6	–	0
Iowa	3	–	5	–	0	5	–	6	–	0
Wisconsin	3	–	6	–	0	5	–	6	–	0
Illinois	2	–	6	–	0	3	–	8	–	0
Northwestern	1	–	8	–	0	1	–	10	–	0
+ – Conference co-champions; Rankings from AP Poll

The 1977 Wisconsin Badgers football team represented the University of Wisconsin–Madison in the 1977 Big Ten Conference football season. Led by John Jardine in his eighth and final season as head coach, the Badgers compiled an overall record of 5–6 with a mark of 3–6 in conference play, placing eighth in the Big Ten. Wisconsin played home games at Camp Randall Stadium in Madison, Wisconsin.

== Schedule ==
Date	Opponent	Rank	Site	Result	Attendance	Source
September 10	at Indiana		Memorial Stadium; Bloomington, IN	W 30–14	34,755	
September 17	Northern Illinois*		Camp Randall Stadium; Madison, WI	W 14–3	64,475	
September 24	at Oregon*		Autzen Stadium; Eugene, OR	W 22–10	30,750	
October 1	Northwestern		Camp Randall Stadium; Madison, WI	W 19–7	68,709	
October 8	Illinois	No. 19	Camp Randall Stadium; Madison, WI	W 26–0	78,661	
October 15	at No. 1 Michigan	No. 14	Michigan Stadium; Ann Arbor, MI	L 0–56	104,892	
October 22	Michigan State^{†}		Camp Randall Stadium; Madison, WI	L 7–9	79,203	
October 29	at No. 3 Ohio State		Ohio Stadium; Columbus, OH	L 0–42	87,837	
November 5	Purdue		Camp Randall Stadium; Madison, WI	L 0–22	83,322	
November 12	Iowa		Camp Randall Stadium; Madison, WI (rivalry)	L 8–24	71,723	
November 19	at Minnesota		Minneapolis, MN; Memorial Stadium (rivalry)	L 7–13	30,742	
*Non-conference game; ^{†}Homecoming; Rankings from AP Poll released prior to the game

== Roster ==
1977 Wisconsin Badgers football team roster
Players
Coaches
Offense

Pos.	#	Name	Class
TE	86	Greg Barber	Jr
WR	19	Tom Braker	So
RB	27	Terry Breuscher	Sr
WR	10	David Charles	Jr
RB	39	Kevin Cohee	Jr
WR		John Cox	Sr
QB	17	Anthony Dudley	Jr
G	64	Bob Graham	Sr
QB	11	Charles Green	Jr
FB	36	Tim Halleran	Jr
G	56	Brad Jackomino	Jr
QB	18	Mike Kalasmiki	So
OT	74	Tom Kaltenberg	Sr
G	66	Pat Kelly	Jr
OT	68	David Krall	Jr
OT	60	Steve Lick	Sr
RB	25	Ira Matthews	Jr
C	58	Al Minter	Sr
C	50	Jim McCoy	Jr
OT	71	Steve Montgomery	Sr
C	52	Jim Moore	Jr
RB	33	Mike Morgan	Sr
TE	85	Bruce Muschinski	Sr
FB	32	Joe Rodriguez	Sr
OT	75	Ray Snell	So
WR	6	Wayne Souza	So
FB	26	Tom Stauss	So
OT	62	John Wagner	So
WR		Jim Watrud	Jr
OT	78	Doug Witkus	Sr

Defense

Pos.	#	Name	Class
LB	41	Dave Ahrens	Fr
DE	38	Kevin Boodry	Jr
S		Mike Borgerding	Sr
DE	82	Mike Burt	Jr
DT	67	Kasey Cabral	So
LB	14	David Crossen	Jr
DT	57	Bob Czechowicz	Sr
CB	21	Scott Erdmann	Jr
CB	8	Greg Gordon	Jr
LB	15	Kurt Holm	Jr
DT	90	Thomas Houston	So
CB	37	Lawrence Johnson	Jr
MG	42	Joe Lerro	Sr
LB	47	Dave Levenick	Fr
MG	20	Dan Relich	Jr
S	9	Dan Schieble	Jr
DT	76	Tom Schremp	So
DE	35	Dennis Stejskal (C)	Sr
DE	89	Jeff Vine	So
DT	69	Jeff Walsh	Sr
LB	49	Lee Washington	So
S	12	George Welch	So
DT	70	Bruce Woodford	So

Special teams

Pos.	#	Name	Class
P	3	Dick Milaeger	Sr
K	7	Steve Veith	So

Head coach

- John Jardine

Coordinators/assistant coaches

- Mike Stock – Offensive Coordinator/Running Backs
- Gary Blackney – Defensive Coordinator/Defensive Backs
- Tom Backhus – Offensive Line
- George Chryst – Offensive Line
- Arnold Jeter – Defensive Ends
- Pat Naughton – Defensive Line
- Mario Russo – Linebackers
- Bob Spoo – Quarterbacks
- LaVern Van Dyke – Administrative Assistant

Legend

- (C) Team captain
- (S) Suspended
- (I) Ineligible
- Injured
- Redshirt
