= 1977 Illinois Fighting Illini football team =

American college football season

1977 Illinois Fighting Illini football
- Conference: Big Ten Conference
- Record: 3–8 (2–6 Big Ten)
- Head coach: Gary Moeller (1st season)
- MVPs: James Coleman; John Sullivan
- Captains: Rickie Mitchem; Kurt Steger
- Home stadium: Memorial Stadium

1977 Big Ten Conference football standings
	Conf.					Overall
Team	W		L		T	W		L		T
No. 9 Michigan +	7	–	1	–	0	10	–	2	–	0
No. 11 Ohio State +	7	–	1	–	0	9	–	3	–	0
Michigan State	6	–	1	–	1	7	–	3	–	1
Indiana	4	–	3	–	1	5	–	5	–	1
Minnesota	4	–	4	–	0	7	–	5	–	0
Purdue	3	–	5	–	0	5	–	6	–	0
Iowa	3	–	5	–	0	5	–	6	–	0
Wisconsin	3	–	6	–	0	5	–	6	–	0
Illinois	2	–	6	–	0	3	–	8	–	0
Northwestern	1	–	8	–	0	1	–	10	–	0
+ – Conference co-champions; Rankings from AP Poll

The 1977 Illinois Fighting Illini football team was an American football team that represented the University of Illinois as a member of the Big Ten Conference during the 1977 Big Ten season. In their first year under head coach Gary Moeller, the Fighting Illini compiled a 3–8 record (2–6 in conference games), finished in ninth place in the Big Ten, and were outscored by a total of 292 to 141.

The team's statistical leaders include quarterback Mike McCray (418 passing yards, 60.0% completion percentage), running back James Coleman (715 rushing yards, 5.0 yards per carry), wide receiver Tom Schooley (15 receptions for 231 yards), and kicker Dave Finzer (25 points scored, 7 of 13 extra points, 6 of 11 field goals). Coleman and linebacker John Sullivan were selected as the team's most valuable players. Guard Kevin Pancratz and linebacker John Sullivan received first-team honors on the 1977 All-Big Ten Conference football team.

The team played its home games at Memorial Stadium in Champaign, Illinois.

== Schedule ==
Date	Opponent	Site	Result	Attendance	Source
September 10	No. 2 Michigan	Memorial Stadium; Champaign, IL (rivalry)	L 9–37	60,477	
September 17	Missouri*	Memorial Stadium; Champaign, IL (rivalry)	W 11–7	52,771	
September 24	at Stanford*	Stanford Stadium; Stanford, CA	L 24–37	50,500	
October 1	Syracuse*	Memorial Stadium; Champaign, IL	L 20–30	52,015	
October 8	at No. 19 Wisconsin	Camp Randall Stadium; Madison, WI	L 0–26	78,661	
October 15	at Purdue	Ross–Ade Stadium; West Lafayette, IN (rivalry)	W 29–22	60,242	
October 22	Indiana	Memorial Stadium; Champaign, IL (rivalry)	W 21–7	50,298	
October 29	at Michigan State	Spartan Stadium; East Lansing, MI	L 20–49	70,589	
November 5	No. 4 Ohio State	Memorial Stadium; Champaign, IL (Illibuck)	L 0–35	66,973	
November 12	Minnesota	Memorial Stadium; Champaign, IL	L 0–21	37,697	
November 19	at Northwestern	Dyche Stadium; Evanston, IL (rivalry)	L 7–21	17,255	
*Non-conference game; Rankings from AP Poll released prior to the game

== Roster ==
1977 Illinois Fighting Illini football team roster
Players
Coaches
Offense

Pos.	#	Name	Class
TE	81	Mike Sherrod	Jr
QB	10	Nick Sowa	Jr

Defense

Pos.	#	Name	Class
LB	87	Mikę Brzuszkiewicz	Jr
LB	97	John Sullivan	Sr
LB	67	John Thiede	So
DT	69	Bruce Thornton	Jr
CB	14	Derwin Tucker	Jr
DT	96	Joe Waymire	Jr

Special teams

Pos.	#	Name	Class

Head coach

- Gary Moeller

Coordinators/assistant coaches

Legend

- (C) Team captain
- (S) Suspended
- (I) Ineligible
- Injured
- Redshirt

Roster
