= John Pont =

American football player, coach, and administrator (1927–2008)

Biographical details
- Born: November 13, 1927; Canton, Ohio, U.S.
- Died: July 1, 2008 (aged 80); Oxford, Ohio, U.S.

Playing career
- 1949–1951: Miami (OH)
- 1952: Toronto Balmy Beach Beachers
- Position: Halfback

Coaching career (HC unless noted)
- 1953–1955: Miami (OH) (assistant)
- 1956–1962: Miami (OH)
- 1963–1964: Yale
- 1965–1972: Indiana
- 1973–1977: Northwestern
- 1984–1989: Hamilton HS (OH)
- 1990–1992: Mount St. Joseph

Administrative career (AD unless noted)
- 1975–1980: Northwestern

Head coaching record
- Overall: 107–141–4 (college)
- Bowls: 0–2

Accomplishments and honors

Championships
- 2 MAC (1957–1958); 1 Big Ten (1967)

Awards
- Imperial Oil Trophy (1952); AFCA Coach of the Year (1967); Eddie Robinson Coach of the Year (1967); Paul "Bear" Bryant Award (1967); Sporting News College Football COY (1967); Walter Camp Coach of the Year Award (1967); Miami RedHawks No. 42 retired

John Pont (November 13, 1927 – July 1, 2008) was an American football player and coach. He served as head football coach at Miami University in Oxford, Ohio, from 1956 to 1962, Yale University from 1963 to 1964, Indiana University Bloomington from 1965 to 1972, Northwestern University from 1973 to 1977, and Mount St. Joseph University in Delhi, Ohio, from 1990 to 1992, compiling a career college football head coaching record of 107–141–4.

== Early life ==
Pont was born on November 13, 1927, in Canton, Ohio, to Bautista and Suzannah Pont. He graduated from Timken High School in Canton. As an undergraduate at Miami University, Pont was an outstanding halfback, playing for coaches Woody Hayes and Ara Parseghian, and was a member of the Sigma Chi fraternity. After a serving a tour as a Navy submariner, Pont played professional football in Canada. He and several of his "Cradle of Coaches" compatriots are the subject of the book Fields of Honor, written by Pont's niece, Sally Pont.

== Career ==
=== Playing ===
After playing college football at Miami University, Pont went to Canada and played with Toronto Balmy Beach Beachers of the Ontario Rugby Football Union, where he won the Imperial Oil Trophy as league MVP in 1952.

=== Coaching ===
He was the only Indiana University coach to take a team to the Rose Bowl. Later in his career, Pont was recruited to start a football program at Cincinnati's College of Mount St. Joseph. He later served as coach and consultant in creating a semi-professional football league in Japan. He was honored as NCAA Division I-A coach of the year in 1967, the year his Hoosiers appeared in the Rose Bowl. He was a member of the Cradle of Coaches and the Miami and Indiana Athletic Halls of Fame as well as Mid-American Conference Hall of Fame and the Indiana Football Hall of Fame.

He went 6–4 in 1968. It would be the last winning season he had as a college coach, with Pont having just two winning seasons at Indiana. Despite rumors that he would stay at Indiana, Pont signed a five-year contract to succeed Alex Agase at Northwestern University on December 23, 1972. He announced on November 14, 1977, that he would remain as athletic director while relinquishing his head coaching duties effective at the end of the season. Rick Venturi succeeded him seventeen days later on December 1. Both Pont and Venturi were dismissed on November 18, 1980, after the Wildcats went 1–31–1 within a three-year span culminating with a 0–11 campaign and a twenty-game losing streak. Additionally, all but one of the black players on the football team had protested against the unequal treatment of African-American student athletes within the program.

== Personal life and death ==
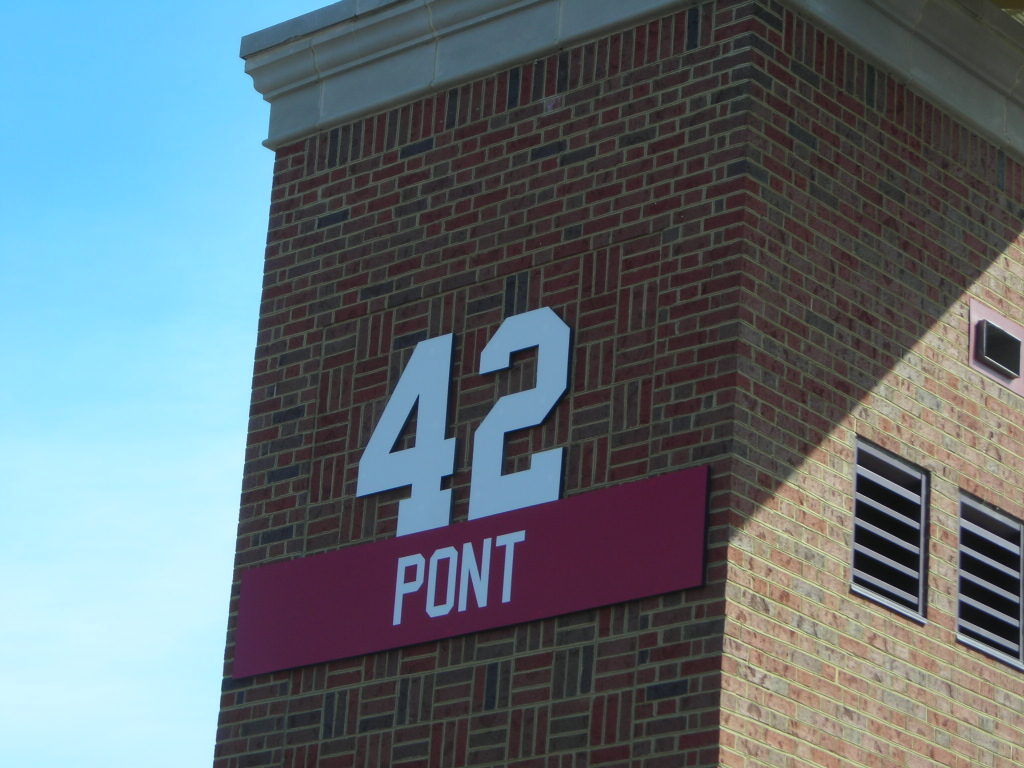
Pont's number 42 displayed at Yager Stadium. Pont is one of four football players to have his number retired by Miami University.

Pont died at his home in Oxford, Ohio, on July 1, 2008.

Pont's grandson, also named John Pont, is the head football coach for Oberlin College, a position he has held since 2023.

== Head coaching record ==
=== College ===
Year	Team	Overall	Conference	Standing	Bowl/playoffs	Coaches^{#}	AP^{°}
Miami Redskins (Mid-American Conference) (1956–1962)
1956	Miami	7–1–1	4–0–1	2nd			
1957	Miami	6–3	5–0	1st			
1958	Miami	6–3	5–0	1st			
1959	Miami	5–4	3–2	3rd			
1960	Miami	5–5	2–3	4th			
1961	Miami	6–4	3–2	3rd			
1962	Miami	8–2–1	3–1–1	3rd	L Tangerine		
Miami:		43–22–2	25–8–2				
Yale Bulldogs (Ivy League) (1963–1964)
1963	Yale	6–3	4–3	T–4th			
1964	Yale	6–2–1	4–2–1	3rd			
Yale:		12–5–1	8–5–1				
Indiana Hoosiers (Big Ten Conference) (1965–1972)
1965	Indiana	2–8	1–6	9th			
1966	Indiana	1–8–1	1–5–1	9th			
1967	Indiana	9–2	6–1	T–1st	L Rose	6	4
1968	Indiana	6–4	4–3	T–5th			
1969	Indiana	4–6	3–4	T–5th			
1970	Indiana	1–9	1–6	T–9th			
1971	Indiana	3–8	2–6	9th			
1972	Indiana	5–6	3–5	T–6th			
Indiana:		31–51–1	21–36–1				
Northwestern Wildcats (Big Ten Conference) (1973–1977)
1973	Northwestern	5–6	4–4	T–4th			
1974	Northwestern	2–8	2–6	T–7th			
1975	Northwestern	3–8	2–6	9th			
1976	Northwestern	1–10	1–7	10th			
1977	Northwestern	1–10	1–8	10th			
Northwestern:		12–43	10–31				
Mount St. Joseph Lions (NAIA Division II independent) (1990–1992)
1990	Mount St. Joseph	1–9					
1991	Mount St. Joseph	4–6					
1992	Mount St. Joseph	4–5					
Mount St. Joseph:		9–20					
Total:		107–141–4					
National championship Conference title Conference division title or championship game berth
^{#}Rankings from final Coaches Poll.; ^{°}Rankings from final AP Poll.
