= 1977 Hall of Fame Classic =

Minnesota Golden Gophers	Maryland Terrapins
(6–5)	(7–4)
7	17
Head coach: Cal Stoll	Head coach: Jerry Claiborne
	1	2	3	4	Total
Minnesota	7	0	0	0	7
Maryland	3	14	0	0	17
- Date: December 22, 1977
- Season: 1977
- Stadium: Legion Field
- Location: Birmingham, Alabama
- MVP: SE Chuck White
- Referee: Dan Foley (Big Eight; split crew: Big Eight, SEC)
- Attendance: 47,000

United States TV coverage
- Network: Mizlou Television Network
- Announcers: Jim Karvellas, Don Perkins, and Howard David

The 1977 Hall of Fame Classic was a college football postseason bowl game between the Minnesota Golden Gophers and the Maryland Terrapins.

== Background ==
The Golden Gophers finished fifth in the Big Ten Conference while the Terrapins finished tied for third in the Atlantic Coast Conference. This was Maryland's second bowl game in the calendar year of 1977. This was Minnesota's first bowl game since 1962.

== Game summary ==
George Scott rushed 24 times for 75 yards, with two touchdowns in the second quarter that proved to be the winning points.

=== First quarter ===
- Minnesota – Barber 1-yard run (Rogind kick) 9:02 left
- Maryland – Sochko 32-yard field goal 5:21 left

=== Second quarter ===
- Maryland – Scott 2-yard run (Sochko kick) 7:04 left
- Maryland – Scott 1-yard run (Sochko kick) 4:53 left

== Aftermath ==
Minnesota did not reach a bowl game again until 1985. Maryland reached two more bowl games before Jerry Claiborne left for Kentucky after the 1981 season.

== Statistics ==
Statistics	Maryland	Minnesota
First downs	15	17
Rushing yards	120	113
Passing yards	211	155
Comp-Att-Int	12–23–1	13–26–0
Return yards	3	6
Punts–average	5–36.8	9–27.7
Fumbles–lost	3–2	3–2
Penalties–yards	12–80	6–54
