= Larry Bethea =

American football player (1956–1987)

No. 76
- Position: Defensive end / Defensive tackle

Personal information
- Born: July 21, 1956; Florence, South Carolina, U.S.
- Died: April 23, 1987 (aged 30); Hampton, Virginia, U.S.
- Listed height: 6 ft 5 in (1.96 m)
- Listed weight: 251 lb (114 kg)

Career information
- High school: Ferguson (VA)
- College: Michigan State
- NFL draft: 1978: 1st round, 28th overall pick

Career history
- Dallas Cowboys (1978–1983); Michigan Panthers (1984–1985); Houston Gamblers (1985)

Awards and highlights
- Third-team All-American (1977); Big Ten Most Valuable Player (1977); Big Ten Conference Medal of Honor (1978); First-team All-Big Ten (1977); Second-team All-Big Ten (1976)

Career NFL statistics
- Sacks: 11
- Fumble recoveries: 1
- Stats at Pro Football Reference

Larry Bethea (July 21, 1956 – April 24, 1987) was an American football defensive lineman for the Dallas Cowboys in the National Football League (NFL) for six seasons. He was also a member of the Michigan Panthers and Houston Gamblers of the United States Football League (USFL). Bethea was selected by the Cowboys in the first round of the 1978 NFL draft, after playing college football for the Michigan State Spartans and winning Big Ten Most Valuable Player in 1977. He killed himself after being identified as a suspect in two armed robberies.

== Early life ==
Bethea was a standout for Ferguson High School, playing both ways as an offensive end and defensive end. He was a Parade All-American and a Group AAA All-state selection in 1973. He accepted a football scholarship from Michigan State University, where he began as a tight end until being converted into a defensive tackle during his sophomore season.

In 1977 season, he totaled 45 solo tackles, 45 assisted tackles, 18 tackles for loss and 16 sacks, and he became the first defensive player to receive Big Ten Conference MVP honors since Dick Butkus in 1964.

Bethea finished his college career as a three-year starter, with school records in career sacks (33), career tackles for loss (43), and sacks in a season (16).

== Professional career ==
=== Dallas Cowboys ===
Bethea was selected by the Dallas Cowboys in the first round (28th overall) of the 1978 NFL draft, who were looking for an eventual successor to either Harvey Martin or Ed "Too Tall" Jones. As a rookie, he played on special teams and was a backup behind Martin and Jethro Pugh. His most notable play was stopping Los Angeles Rams' fullback Jim Jodat at the Cowboys' 11 yard line on fourth and one during the third quarter of the 1978 NFC Championship game.

In 1979, after Jones retired to pursue a boxing career, Bethea was named the starter at left defensive end at the beginning of training camp. The job went to Larry Cole and Bethea was moved to defensive tackle, where he could not move ahead of Dave Stalls on the depth chart. He started two games in place of an injured Randy White, finishing the season with 28 tackles and 4 sacks.

In 1981, he was a backup defensive tackle and collected two sacks in the season opener against the St. Louis Cardinals. He started in the NFC Championship Game against the San Francisco 49ers in place of an injured John Dutton, and although he recovered a fumble, he was one of the defenders that Joe Montana released his pass over so Dwight Clark could make "The Catch", propelling the 49ers to a 28–27 win.

In 1982, Bethea was a backup at defensive end and registered two sacks.

=== Michigan Panthers ===
On February 1, 1984, Bethea signed a three-year guaranteed contract with the Michigan Panthers of the United States Football League. His personal problems continued with the Panthers, as he was suspended on different occasions.

On April 10, 1985, after the Panthers merged with the Oakland Invaders, and the Invaders was the lone surviving team, Bethea was traded to the Houston Gamblers in exchange for a draft choice.

=== Houston Gamblers ===
In April 1985, he was released by the Houston Gamblers because of his inconsistent play and tardiness.

== Personal life ==
In 1985, Bethea pleaded guilty to setting three fires in Mount Rainier National Park in Paradise Washington. He was ordered to pay $1,000 to the park to cover the cost of fighting the fires.

In 1986, he was jailed on charges of assaulting his wife and stealing his mother's life savings of $64,000. In 1987, he was given a suspended four-year prison term for stealing. The judge also ordered Bethea to serve two years on probation while repaying the money.

In a final incident, on April 23, 1987, police were called by an unidentified source who said the former football player had robbed two convenience stores. Bethea was later found in a friend's backyard with a self-inflicted gunshot wound to his right temple and a .38-caliber automatic pistol near his body. He was taken to Hampton General Hospital, where he was pronounced dead at 2:08 a.m. The gun used in the shooting and the two robberies was believed to be a weapon that was reported stolen from a parked vehicle in the city.
