= John Jardine (American football) =

American football player and coach (1935–1990)

Biographical details
- Born: July 20, 1935
- Died: March 23, 1990 (aged 54); Madison, Wisconsin, U.S.

Playing career
- 1955–1957: Purdue
- Position: Guard

Coaching career (HC unless noted)
- 1958: Lafayette CCHS (IN) (assistant)
- 1959–1963: Fenwick HS (IL)
- 1964: Purdue (OL)
- 1965–1969: UCLA (OL/TE)
- 1970–1977: Wisconsin

Head coaching record
- Overall: 37–47–3 (college); 51–6–1 (high school)

John Jardine (July 20, 1935 – March 23, 1990) was an American football player and coach. He served as the head football coach at the University of Wisconsin–Madison from 1970 to 1977, compiling a record of 37–47–3. Jardine's best season came in 1974, when his Wisconsin Badgers went 7–4 and placed fourth in the Big Ten Conference. Noteworthy was the Badgers' 21–20 victory over the perennial powerhouse Nebraska during the second week of the season.

Jardine was a graduate of Purdue University where he was a starting guard in 1956 and 1957. He began his coaching career at Central Catholic High School in Lafayette, Indiana in 1958, then moved to the head coaching job at Fenwick High School in Oak Park, Illinois. Jardine's five teams at Fenwick produced an overall 51–6–1 record and the Friars played in the Chicago Catholic League title game in 1959, 1961, and 1962. His 1962 squad was undefeated, winning the Chicago city title.

Jardine left the prep ranks following the 1963 season, returning to Purdue as an offensive line coach under Jack Mollenkopf. He coached the guards and centers and recruited the Chicago area. He then served as offensive line coach under Tommy Prothro at UCLA from 1965 to 1969.

Jardine became Wisconsin's head football coach on December 22, 1969, after North Dakota State athletic director and head football coach Ron Erhardt declined a firm offer to accept the position.

== Head coaching record ==
=== College ===
Year	Team	Overall	Conference	Standing	Bowl/playoffs
Wisconsin Badgers (Big Ten Conference) (1970–1977)
1970	Wisconsin	4–5–1	3–4	T–5th	
1971	Wisconsin	4–6–1	3–5	T–6th	
1972	Wisconsin	4–7	2–6	9th	
1973	Wisconsin	4–7	3–5	8th	
1974	Wisconsin	7–4	5–3	4th	
1975	Wisconsin	4–6–1	3–4–1	6th	
1976	Wisconsin	5–6	3–5	T–7th	
1977	Wisconsin	5–6	3–6	8th	
Wisconsin:		37–47–3	25–38–1		
Total:		37–47–3			
