= Chris Ward (offensive lineman) =

American football player (born 1955)

No. 72
- Position: Offensive tackle

Personal information
- Born: December 16, 1955 (age 70); Dayton, Ohio, U.S.
- Listed height: 6 ft 3 in (1.91 m)
- Listed weight: 267 lb (121 kg)

Career information
- High school: Dayton (OH) Patterson
- College: Ohio State
- NFL draft: 1978: 1st round, 4th overall pick

Career history
- New York Jets (1978–1983); New Orleans Saints (1984)

Awards and highlights
- PFWA All-Rookie Team (1978); Unanimous All-American (1977); Consensus All-American (1976); 3× First-team All-Big Ten (1975, 1976, 1977); Ohio State Hall of Fame

Career NFL statistics
- Games played: 100
- Games started: 95
- College Football Hall of Fame

Christopher Lamar Ward (born December 16, 1955) is an American former professional football player who was an offensive tackle in the National Football League (NFL) for the New York Jets and New Orleans Saints. He played college football at Ohio State University. He is the son-in-law of Jim Brown. He was selected in the first round of the 1978 NFL draft with the fourth overall pick.
