= Joe Norman =

American football player (born 1956)

No. 52
- Position: Linebacker

Personal information
- Born: October 15, 1956 (age 70); Millersburg, Ohio, U.S.
- Listed height: 6 ft 1 in (1.85 m)
- Listed weight: 220 lb (100 kg)

Career information
- High school: West Holmes (Millersburg)
- College: Indiana
- NFL draft: 1979: 2nd round, 45th overall pick

Career history
- Seattle Seahawks (1979–1981, 1983)

Awards and highlights
- First-team All-Big Ten (1978)

Career NFL statistics
- Sacks: 3
- Interceptions: 1
- Fumble recoveries: 3
- Stats at Pro Football Reference

Joseph Dennison Norman (born October 15, 1956) is an American former professional football player who was a linebacker for five seasons with the Seattle Seahawks of the National Football League (NFL). He played college football for the Indiana Hoosiers.
