= Steve Stewart (American football) =

American football player (born 1956)

No. 58
- Position: Linebacker

Personal information
- Born: May 1, 1956 (age 70); Minneapolis, Minnesota, U.S.
- Listed height: 6 ft 2 in (1.88 m)
- Listed weight: 217 lb (98 kg)

Career information
- High school: Richfield (MN)
- College: Minnesota
- NFL draft: 1978: 2nd round, 43rd overall pick

Career history
- Atlanta Falcons (1978); Green Bay Packers (1979); San Francisco 49ers (1980)*
- * Offseason or practice squad member only

Career NFL statistics
- Sacks: 1
- Stats at Pro Football Reference

Steve Stewart (born May 1, 1956) is an American former professional football player in the National Football League (NFL). Stewart was May 1, 1956, in Minneapolis, Minnesota, where he attended Richfield High School. After high school, he attended the University of Minnesota where he played for their football team. During the 1977 season with Minnesota, he was named the team's most valuable defensive player.

He was selected by the Atlanta Falcons in the second round of the 1978 NFL draft and played 12 games that season as a linebacker with the team. Stewart noted his challenges with going from Minnesota's colder climate to the hotter climate in Atlanta. He was cut just prior to the 1979 NFL season and was subsequently signed by the Green Bay Packers. He played three games that season with the Packers. He was released early in the season to make room for Earl Edwards, who was signed.
