= Bob Commings =

American football player and coach (1932–1992)

Biographical details
- Born: December 24, 1932; Youngstown, Ohio, U.S.
- Died: February 20, 1992 (aged 59)

Playing career
- 1953, 1956–1957: Iowa

Coaching career (HC unless noted)
- 1958–1959: Iowa (assistant)
- 1962–1968: Struthers HS (OH)
- 1969–1973: Massillon Washington HS (OH)
- 1974–1978: Iowa
- 1980–1991: GlenOak HS (OH)

Head coaching record
- Overall: 18–37 (college); 169–66–7 (high school)

Accomplishments and honors

Awards
- Second-team All-Big Ten (1957)

Bob Commings (December 24, 1932 – February 20, 1992) was a college football player and coach at the University of Iowa. He was also a high school football coach for 24 years in the state of Ohio.

== Early life and playing career ==
Commings was born on Christmas Eve at the height of the Great Depression. He grew up in Ohio and played high school football at Youngstown's East High School. After graduating from high school in 1952, he enrolled at the University of Iowa. Commings spent his first two years at Iowa, lettering as a sophomore in 1953. That season, Coach Forest Evashevski's Hawkeyes finished the year ranked ninth in the nation in the final AP Poll.

With the Korean War raging abroad, Commings signed up with the Marine Corps, serving for two years before returning to Iowa. He played his junior season in 1956 on the offensive and defensive lines. That Iowa team won the Big Ten Conference title, and Commings started in the 1957 Rose Bowl for the Hawkeyes, helping Iowa to a 35–19 victory.

As a senior in 1957, Commings helped Iowa to a 7–1–1 record and a number six ranking in the final AP Poll. He was good friends with fellow lineman Alex Karras, who later had success as a professional athlete and actor. Though Karras won the 1957 Outland Trophy, it was Bob Commings at the end of the year that was voted as Iowa's 1957 MVP. In his three years at Iowa, Commings helped the Hawkeyes to a 21–5–1 record, and Iowa finished the year ranked in the top ten of the AP poll in each of his three years as a Hawkeye player.

== Early coaching career ==
Commings was an assistant coach at Iowa for two seasons in 1958 and 1959 before leaving to become a high school coach in Ohio. He coached Struthers High School in Struthers, Ohio, for seven seasons from 1962 to 1968, compiling a 50–16–4 record. Commings then took over at Massillon Washington High School in Massillon, Ohio.

In five seasons from 1969 to 1973, Commings' teams had a combined 43–6–2 record. His 1970 Massillon team had an undefeated 10–0 record, outscoring their opponents 412–29 and winning a state poll championship. His 1971 team lost two games by one point each but outscored their other eight opponents 287–18. His 1972 team took a 10–0 record to the first Ohio state playoffs before losing. His 1973 team was unbeaten before dropping its season finale to archrival Canton McKinley. The 21–0 loss to the Bulldogs was his worst loss in five years at Massillon.

== Iowa coaching career ==
In 1974, Iowa football was in the midst of an extended slump, having not had a winning season since 1961. The school had just fired their previous coach, Frank Lauterbur, for having a 4–28–1 record over three years, and Iowa was gaining a reputation as a coaching graveyard, and many wondered if any coach could win at Iowa.

Commings let it be known that he wanted the job badly, and he even came to Iowa to campaign for it. At one of these rallies, Commings told reporters, "I feel I can win at Iowa. Obviously, it's going to take football players, but I don't feel anybody has a better rapport with the high school players than me. We have always had a very sophisticated football program at Massillon. My coaching staff (nine men) is larger than at most colleges."

Commings appealed to Iowa fans, because he had a Hawkeye background as a player and assistant coach during the Rose Bowl years. Though he had never coached at the college level, he had had tremendous success coaching high school football in Ohio, a state known as a hotbed for football talent. Finally, his enthusiasm for the job was evident. Commings stated that the Iowa job was the only college job he would ever want, and he offered to work with a one-year contract if necessary. If he did not deliver on his promise to win at Iowa, he could be let go after just one year. Commings said, "All I want is the job. If they had told me I had to pick corn in the off-season to get the job, I'd have done it." Iowa athletic director Bump Elliott took Bob Commings up on his challenge, making him the 23rd head coach in the history of Iowa football by signing him to a one-year contract for the 1974 season. He was the third Iowa graduate to take the reins as Iowa's head football coach, joining John G. Griffith in 1909 and Leonard Raffensperger in 1950–1951.

Unfortunately, Iowa was riding a school-record 11 game losing streak, and Iowa's first four games in 1974 were against teams ranked in the top 20 of the AP Poll. After a road loss at Michigan, Commings coached his first home game in Iowa City against #12 UCLA. He told his team, a two touchdown underdog, before the game, "You are unique. In addition to being ridiculed for last season, you have the nation's toughest schedule. Now you have a chance to show people all over America what desire and determination can prove. It may be that you are the chosen children." The Hawkeyes shocked the country, and most of its fans, by pulling a 21–10 upset. Iowa fans sported "Chosen Children" badges, and Commings' contract was extended to three years. The Hawks also defeated Northwestern to snap a nine-game conference losing streak in 1974 and ended the year with a 3–8 record.

Iowa had another 3–8 record in 1975, but three of the losses were by four points or less. The Hawkeyes were competitive again, and Commings' contract was extended through 1979. In 1976, the Hawkeyes, nicknamed the "Wild Bunch", stunned Penn State, the number 11 ranked team in the nation, in Happy Valley for Iowa's first non-conference road win in 11 years. Iowa finished the 1976 season with a 5–6 record, agonizingly close to a winning record.

The 1977 season was highlighted by Iowa's first game with Iowa State in 34 years. The first meeting between the two schools after such a long suspension in the series was met with great anticipation across the state. Seemingly, the only person unexcited about the game was Coach Commings, who said, "I'd rather be playing Utah." Before the game, Iowa State coach Earle Bruce had Iowa State change into special jerseys emblazoned with the phrase "Beat Iowa" across the chest above the numbers. Iowa defeated the Cyclones, 12–10, in a defensive struggle. Although Commings was not a big fan of the rivalry, that win probably earned him another year after a disappointing season in 1977. Iowa had a record of 4–7, although some sources note that UCLA was forced to forfeit their win against Iowa due to an ineligible player and list Iowa's record that season as 5–6.

Whether it was 4–7 or 5–6, the fact remained that Iowa had posted its 16th consecutive non-winning season, which was now the longest streak in the nation. The feeling among fans seemed to be that Commings, in his fifth year, needed to deliver a winning season in 1978. Iowa's starting quarterback in 1978 was Bob Commings Jr. He performed well, but the team did not. After winning the opening game, the 1978 Hawkeyes lost their next eight games and ended the year with a 2–9 record. Commings, who had one year left on his contract, said that he thought the school had a "moral and legal" obligation to allow him to coach in 1979. Bump Elliott disagreed, and Bob Commings was relieved of his duties after the 1978 season.

Bob Commings had accepted the Iowa football head coaching job with glee. Later, he admitted, "It's a tougher job than I figured. No one outside of coaching has a concept of what it takes. I guess the answer still is that it takes time. There are so many things involved." His Iowa ties and the fact that he considered the Hawkeye coaching position as his dream job made his firing especially painful. But while he delivered several shocking wins, the overall record was poor. Commings was the tenth man to coach Iowa for at least five years, and his record of 17–38 was the poorest among the ten. Commings was replaced by Hayden Fry, who would coach the Hawkeyes for 20 years and have the most wins of any coach in Iowa football history, until Kirk Ferentz surpassed that mark.

== Return to high school ranks ==
Commings turned down an offer from the university to take another job within the athletic department. He remained in Iowa City for several months as a representative of an insurance agency. During the 1979 season, he was a color commentator for Iowa football games.

But coaching was always in his blood. In 1980, Commings took a job at GlenOak High School in Canton, Ohio. He coached there for 12 seasons, compiling a 76–44–1 record. Bob Commings was diagnosed with cancer in 1991 and turned his football team over to his son, Bob Commings Jr. He died within six months, survived by his wife, Sharon, and another son, Don.

In 24 seasons as a high school coach in Ohio, Commings had a 169–66–7 record.

== Head coaching record ==
=== College ===
Year	Team	Overall	Conference	Standing	Bowl/playoffs
Iowa Hawkeyes (Big Ten Conference) (1974–1978)
1974	Iowa	3–8	2–6	T–7th	
1975	Iowa	3–8	3–5	T–7th	
1976	Iowa	5–6	3–5	T–7th	
1977	Iowa	5–6	3–5	T–6th	
1978	Iowa	2–9	2–6	8th	
Iowa:		18–37	13–27		
Total:		18–37			
