= Dean Moore =

American football player (born 1955)

No. 53, 59
- Position: Linebacker

Personal information
- Born: January 26, 1955 (age 71); Birmingham, Alabama, U.S.
- Listed height: 6 ft 2 in (1.88 m)
- Listed weight: 210 lb (95 kg)

Career information
- High school: East (Akron, Ohio)
- College: Iowa
- NFL draft: 1978: 9th round, 233rd overall pick

Career history
- San Francisco 49ers (1978); Minnesota Vikings (1980)*; Oakland Invaders (1983–1984); Denver Gold (1985)*
- * Offseason or practice squad member only
- Stats at Pro Football Reference

Dean Irvin Moore (born January 26, 1955) is an American former professional football linebacker who played for the San Francisco 49ers of the National Football League (NFL). He played college football for the Iowa Hawkeyes and was selected by the 49ers in the ninth round of the 1978 NFL draft.

== Early life ==
Dean Irvin Moore was born on January 26, 1955, in Birmingham, Alabama. He attended East High School in Akron, Ohio.

== College career ==
Moore enrolled at the University of Iowa to play college football for the Hawkeyes. He was on the varsity team as a freshman in 1974 but did not earn a letter. He was a three-year letterman from 1975 to 1977. Moore missed most of the 1975 season due to a knee injury. He was the defensive team captain his senior year in 1977 and also shared the overall team MVP award with defensive back Rod Sears.

== Professional career ==
Moore was selected by the San Francisco 49ers in the ninth round, with the 233rd overall pick, of the 1978 NFL draft. He played in all 16 games for the 49ers during the 1978 season as a reserve linebacker and recorded one fumble recovery. He was released on July 16, 1979, during training camp.

Moore signed with the Minnesota Vikings on March 25, 1980. He was released on August 26, 1980, after the third of four preseason games.

On December 1, 1982, Moore was signed by the Oakland Invaders of the United States Football League (USFL) for the 1983 USFL season. He played in all 36 games, starting one, for the Invaders from 1983 to 1984, posting two sacks and six kick returns for 80 yards.

Moore became a free agent after the 1984 season and signed with the Denver Gold on January 21, 1985. He was released on February 11, 1985, 13 days before the team's regular season opener.

== Personal life ==
Moore plays several instruments. He was in a band called Mother Funk.
