= Cal Stoll =

American football player and coach (1923–2000)

- Stoll in 1955

Biographical details
- Born: December 12, 1923; Page, North Dakota, U.S.
- Died: August 25, 2000 (aged 76); Minneapolis, Minnesota, U.S.

Playing career
- 1948–1949: Minnesota
- Position: End

Coaching career (HC unless noted)
- 1950: Mound HS (MN)
- 1951–1954: Utah State (line)
- 1955–1956: Denver (line)
- 1957–1958: Georgia (DL)
- 1959–1968: Michigan State (assistant)
- 1969–1971: Wake Forest
- 1972–1978: Minnesota
- 1986: Warriors Bologna

Head coaching record
- Overall: 54–56 (college); 6–1 (high school); 8–1–1 (AIFA)
- Bowls: 0–1
- Tournaments: 4–0 (AIFA postseason)

Accomplishments and honors

Championships
- 1 Lake Conference (1950); 1 ACC (1970); 1 AIFA Serie A (1986)

Awards
- ACC Coach of the Year (1970)
- Military service
- Allegiance: United States
- Branch: United States Navy
- Service years: 1941–1947
- Conflicts: World War II

Calvin C. Stoll (December 12, 1923 – August 25, 2000) was an American football player and coach. He served as the head football coach at Wake Forest University from 1969 to 1971 and his alma mater, the University of Minnesota, from 1972 to 1978, compiling a career college football head coaching record of 54–56.

== Early life and playing career ==
Stoll was born on December 12, 1923, on a farm near Page, North Dakota, and began his football playing career as a fullback for a six-man team at nearby Tower City, North Dakota. At age 17, he enlisted in the United States Navy on June 3, 1941.

With the outbreak of World War II, Stoll's tour of duty was extended to 1947. During World War II, he served in the Pacific Theater. Stoll also would play football for the Memphis Navy and Seattle Navy squads during his time in the U.S. Navy. After he was discharged from the U.S. Navy on January 9, 1947, Stoll enrolled in the winter quarter at the University of Minnesota.

Stoll would play end for the Minnesota Golden Gophers football team in the 1948 and 1949 seasons. In 1950, Stoll elected to forgo his final year of football eligibility so he could graduate early with a Bachelor of Science degree in education from the University of Minnesota.

== Coaching career ==
Before graduating from Minnesota in June 1950, Stoll was named the head coach at Mound High School (later renamed to Mound Westonka High School) on May 10, 1950. At Mound High School, he guided the football team to a 6–1 record and a Lake Conference co-championship.

After the 1950 high school football season, Stoll jumped to the college ranks where he served as an assistant coach from 1951 to 1968. Stoll served as an assistant coach at Utah State University from 1951 to 1954, the University of Denver from 1955 to 1956, the University of Georgia from 1957 to 1958, and Michigan State University from 1959 to 1968. With the Michigan State Spartans, he helped the team achieve back to back national championships in 1965 and 1966.

Stoll served as the head coach at Wake Forest University from 1969 to 1971 where he led the Demon Deacons to their first Atlantic Coast Conference (ACC) championship in 1970. He was named ACC Coach of the Year that season. Stoll then served as the head football coach at his alma mater, the University of Minnesota, from 1972 to 1978. Stoll's most notable season at Minnesota was in 1977 when he led the Golden Gophers to a 16–0 shutout victory over top ranked Michigan and a trip to the 1977 Hall of Fame Classic. Stoll finished his college coaching career after the 1978 season, compiling a career college football record of 54–56.

In the spring of 1986, Stoll relocated to Italy to become the head coach of Italian amateur football team Warriors Bologna, and won the Italian Bowl VI at Bologna on July 5, 1986. The 1986 Warriors Bologna season was Stoll's last football coaching role as serious health problems forced him into retirement.

== Illness, death, and honors ==
After returning to the United States, Stoll was diagnosed with idiopathic cardiomyopathy, a degeneration of the heart muscle, of unknown origin. Stoll underwent a heart transplant on July 23, 1987.

In 1988, Stoll and other fellow heart transplant recipients, started Second Chance for Life, a support group for heart transplant patients. Also, in 1988, Stoll was inducted into the Minnesota Football Coaches Association Hall of Fame.

After a month long illness due to heart complications, Stoll died on August 25, 2000, 13 years after his heart transplant. In 2001, the Minnesota Football Coaches Association (MFCA) established the Cal Stoll Award. The Cal Stoll Award is given annually by MFCA to an individual connected to football in the State of Minnesota who has overcome adversity.

== Head coaching record ==
=== High school ===
Year	School	Record	Titles
1950	Mound High School	6–1	Lake Conference co-champion
	Overall record	6–1	1 Conference title

=== College ===
Year	Team	Overall	Conference	Standing	Bowl/playoffs
Wake Forest Demon Deacons (Atlantic Coast Conference) (1969–1971)
1969	Wake Forest	3–7	2–5	7th	
1970	Wake Forest	6–5	5–1	1st	
1971	Wake Forest	6–5	2–3	T–3rd	
Wake Forest:		15–17	9–9		
Minnesota Golden Gophers (Big Ten Conference) (1972–1978)
1972	Minnesota	4–7	4–4	5th	
1973	Minnesota	7–4	6–2	3rd	
1974	Minnesota	4–7	2–6	T–7th	
1975	Minnesota	6–5	3–5	T–7th	
1976	Minnesota	6–5	4–4	T–3rd	
1977	Minnesota	7–5	4–4	5th	L Hall of Fame Classic
1978	Minnesota	5–6	4–4	5th	
Minnesota:		39–39	27–29		
Total:		54–56			
National championship Conference title Conference division title or championship game berth

=== AIFA Serie A ===
Team	Year	Regular season					Postseason			
Team	Year	Won	Lost	Ties	Win %	Finish	Won	Lost	Win %	Result
Warriors Bologna	1986	8	1	1	.850	2nd in Girone Nord	4	0	1.000	Italian Bowl VI champions
Total		8	1	1	.850		4	0	1.000	
