= Ray Griffin =

American football player (born 1956)

No. 44
- Position: Defensive back

Personal information
- Born: June 29, 1956 (age 70); Columbus, Ohio, U.S.
- Listed height: 5 ft 10 in (1.78 m)
- Listed weight: 186 lb (84 kg)

Career information
- High school: Eastmoor Academy (Columbus)
- College: Ohio State
- NFL draft: 1978: 2nd round, 35th overall pick

Career history
- Cincinnati Bengals (1978–1984)

Awards and highlights
- 2× Second-team All-American (1976, 1977); 2× First-team All-Big Ten (1976, 1977)

Career NFL statistics
- Interceptions: 11
- Fumble recoveries: 8
- Touchdowns: 3
- Stats at Pro Football Reference

Raymond Eric Griffin (born June 26, 1956) is an American former professional football player who was a cornerback for the Cincinnati Bengals of the National Football League (NFL). He played college football for the Ohio State Buckeyes.

Griffin set up the winning touchdown in the 1975 Michigan-Ohio State rivalry game, by intercepting a Rick Leach pass with the score tied at 14–14. Griffin returned the ball to inside the 10 yard line of Michigan, leading to fullback Pete Johnson's winning touchdown. This winning score put the Buckeyes into the 1976 Rose Bowl

He is the younger brother of two-time Heisman Trophy winner Archie Griffin.
