= 1975 Big Ten Conference football season =

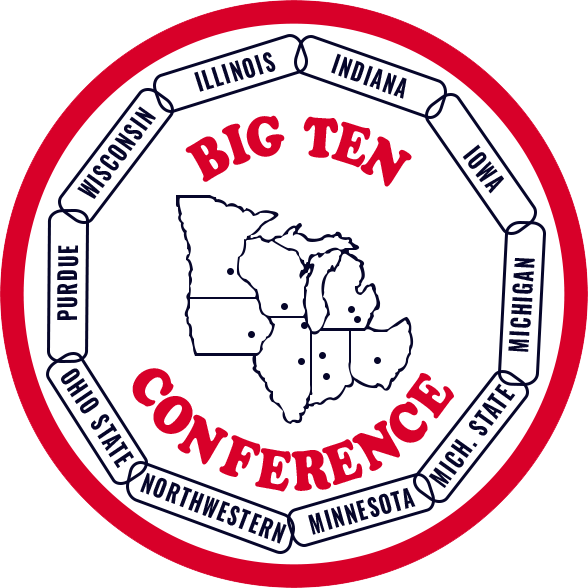
- Sport: American football
- Teams: 10
- Top draft pick: Mike Pruitt
- Champion: Ohio State
- Runners-up: Michigan
- Season MVP: Cornelius Greene

Seasons
- 1974 1976

1975 Big Ten Conference football standings
	Conf.					Overall
Team	W		L		T	W		L		T
No. 4 Ohio State $	8	–	0	–	0	11	–	1	–	0
No. 8 Michigan	7	–	1	–	0	8	–	2	–	2
Michigan State	4	–	4	–	0	7	–	4	–	0
Illinois	4	–	4	–	0	5	–	6	–	0
Purdue	4	–	4	–	0	4	–	7	–	0
Wisconsin	3	–	4	–	1	4	–	6	–	1
Minnesota	3	–	5	–	0	6	–	5	–	0
Iowa	3	–	5	–	0	3	–	8	–	0
Northwestern	2	–	6	–	0	3	–	8	–	0
Indiana	1	–	6	–	1	2	–	8	–	1
$ – Conference champion; Rankings from AP Poll

The 1975 Big Ten Conference football season was the 80th season of college football played by the member schools of the Big Ten Conference and was a part of the 1975 NCAA Division I football season.

The 1975 Ohio State Buckeyes football team, under head coach Woody Hayes, compiled an 11–0 record in the regular season, won the Big Ten championship, led the conference in scoring offense (32.0 points per game) and scoring defense (8.5 points allowed per game), and lost to UCLA in the 1976 Rose Bowl. Running back Archie Griffin won the 1975 Heisman Trophy, becoming the only two-time Heisman winner. Quarterback Cornelius Greene won the Chicago Tribune Silver Football as the Big Ten's most valuable player, and Pete Johnson led the conference with 156 points scored. Griffin, defensive back Tim Fox, and offensive guard Ted Smith were consensus first-team All-Americans.

The 1975 Michigan Wolverines football team, under head coach Bo Schembechler, compiled an 8–2–2 record, finished in second place in the Big Ten, and lost to Oklahoma in the 1976 Orange Bowl. Gordon Bell gained 1,390 rushing yards and was selected as Michigan's most valuable player and a unanimous first-team All-Big Ten player. Defensive back Don Dufek was selected as a first-team All-American by the American Football Coaches Association, Football Writers Association of America, Football News, and the Walter Camp Football Foundation.

The 1975 Michigan State Spartans football team, under head coach Denny Stolz, compiled a 7–4 record and finished in third place in the Big Ten. Charley Baggett led the team with 1,499 total yards, and Levi Jackson gained 1,063 rushing yards and was selected as the team's most valuable player.

Other conference leaders included Minnesota quarterback Tony Dungy with 1,515 passing yards and 1,759 yards of total offense and Purdue wide receiver Scott Yelvington with 686 receiving yards. Wisconsin offensive tackle Dennis Lick was a consensus first-team All-American.

== Season overview ==
=== Results and team statistics ===
Conf. Rank	Team	Head coach	AP final	AP high	Overall record	Conf. record	PPG	PAG	MVP
1	Ohio State	Woody Hayes	#4	#1	11–1	8–0	**32.0**	**8.5**	**Corn. Greene**
2	Michigan	Bo Schembechler	#8	#1	8–2–2	7–1	27.0	10.8	Gordon Bell
3 (tie)	Michigan State	Denny Stolz	NR	#11	7–4	4–4	20.2	15.2	Levi Jackson
3 (tie)	Illinois	Bob Blackman	NR	NR	5–6	4–4	20.8	23.6	Stu Levenick
3 (tie)	Purdue	Alex Agase	NR	NR	4–7	4–4	11.6	20.0	Mike Pruitt
6	Wisconsin	John Jardine	NR	NR	4–6–1	3–4–1	15.8	24.5	Billy Marek
7 (tie)	Minnesota	Cal Stoll	NR	NR	6–5	3–5	21.5	17.5	Tony Dungy
7 (tie)	Iowa	Bob Commings	NR	NR	3–8	3–5	16.5	25.4	Andre Jackson
9	Northwestern	John Pont	NR	NR	3–8	2–6	13.5	28.9	Greg Boykin
10	Indiana	Lee Corso	NR	NR	2-8-1	1-6-1	9.5	23.1	Donnie Thomas

Key
AP final = Team's rank in the final AP Poll of the 1975 season
AP high = Team's highest rank in the AP Poll throughout the 1975 season
PPG = Average of points scored per game; conference leader's average displayed in bold
PAG = Average of points allowed per game; conference leader's average displayed in bold
MVP = Most valuable player as voted by players on each team as part of the voting process to determine the winner of the Chicago Tribune Silver Football trophy; trophy winner in bold

=== Regular season ===
==== September 13 ====
On September 13, 1975, the Big Ten football teams opened the season with five conference games.

- Ohio State 21, Michigan State 0. Ohio State (ranked No. 3 in the AP Poll) defeated Michigan State (ranked No. 11), 21–0, before a crowd of 80,383 at Spartan Stadium in East Lansing, Michigan. Archie Griffin had 108 rushing yards, and Pete Johnson scored two rushing touchdowns.
- Michigan 23, Wisconsin 6. Michigan (ranked No. 2 in the AP Poll) defeated Wisconsin, 23–6, before a crowd of 79,022 at Camp Randall Stadium in Madison, Wisconsin. Michigan rushed for 394 yards, including 210 yards by Gordon Bell. True freshman quarterback Rick Leach completed only 2 of 10 passes, including a touchdown pass to Bell, and threw three interceptions. Bob Wood, in his first game for Michigan's varsity, kicked three field goals and kicked two extra points.
- Illinois 27, Iowa 12.
- Northwestern 31, Purdue 25.
- Indiana 20, Minnesota 14.

==== September 20 ====
On September 20, 1975, the Big Ten teams played 10 non-conference games.

- Ohio State 17, Penn State 9. Ohio State (ranked No. 3 in the AP Poll) defeated Penn State, 17-9, before a crowd of 88,093 at Ohio Stadium in Columbus, Ohio. The Buckeyes rushed for 332 yards, including 128 yards by Archie Griffin and 112 yards by Pete Johnson. Penn State was held to three Chris Bahr field goals
- Michigan 19, Stanford 19. Michigan and Stanford played to a 19–19 tie before a crowd of 92,304 at Michigan Stadium in Ann Arbor, Michigan. Michigan's Bob Wood kicked four field goals, and its sole touchdown came on 48-yard touchdown pass from Rick Leach to Jim Smith. Stanford quarterback Mike Cordova completed 24 of 44 passes for 285 yards. With 1:36 remaining in the game, Michigan's Bob Wood kicked a 52-yard field goal. Cordova then led a drive to Michigan's two-yard line, and Mike Langford kicked the tying field goal with nine seconds remaining in the game.
- Michigan State 14, Miami (OH) 13.
- Minnesota 38, Western Michigan 0.
- Wisconsin 48, South Dakota 7.
- Missouri 30, Illinois 20.
- Notre Dame 17, Purdue 0.
- Syracuse 10, Iowa 7.
- Northwestern 10, Northern Illinois 3.
- Nebraska 45, Indiana 0.

==== September 27 ====
On September 27, 1975, the Big Ten teams played 10 non-conference games.

- Ohio State 32, North Carolina 7.
- Michigan 14, Baylor 14.
- Michigan State 37, North Carolina State 15.
- Minnesota 10, Oregon 7.
- Texas A&M 43, Illinois 13.
- USC 19, Purdue 6.
- Missouri 28, Wisconsin 21.
- Penn State 30, Iowa 10.
- Notre Dame 31, Northwestern 7.
- Indiana 31, Utah 7.

==== October 4 ====
On October 4, 1975, the Big Ten teams played 10 non-conference games.

- Ohio State 41, UCLA 20. Ohio State (ranked No. 2 in the AP Poll) defeated UCLA (ranked No. 13), 41–20, before a crowd of 55,482 at the Los Angeles Memorial Coliseum. Archie Griffin totaled 160 yards on 21 carries, running his NCAA record for consecutive 100-yard games to 25. Ohio State quarterback Cornelius Greene gained 120 rushing yards, scored two touchdowns, and completed six of nine passes for 98 yards.
- Michigan 31, Missouri 7. Michigan (ranked No. 12 in the AP Poll) defeated Missouri (ranked No. 5), 31-7, before a crowd of 104,578 at Michigan Stadium. Michigan's backs ran for 372 yards, and the Wolverines led, 31-0, before Missouri was able to score late in the fourth quarter.
- Michigan State 10, Notre Dame 3. Michigan State defeated Notre Dame (ranked No. 8 in the AP Poll), 10–3, before a crowd of 59,075 at Notre Dame Stadium in South Bend, Indiana. After a scoreless first half, Michigan State and Notre Dame traded field goals in the second half. Late in the fourth quarter, Michigan State's Tyrone Wilson ran 76 yards to the Notre Dame four-yard line to set up a short touchdown run by Levi Jackson.
- Minnesota 21, Ohio 0.
- Illinois 27, Washington State 21.
- Miami (OH) 14, Purdue 3.
- Kansas 41, Wisconsin 7.
- USC 27, Iowa 16.
- Arizona 41, Northwestern 6.
- North Carolina State 27, Indiana 0.

==== October 11 ====
On October 11, 1975, the Big Ten teams played five conference games.

- Ohio State 49, Iowa 0.
- Michigan 16, Michigan State 6. Michigan (ranked No. 8 in the AP Poll) defeated Michigan State (ranked No. 15), 16-6, before a crowd of 79,776 at Spartan Stadium in East Lansing, Michigan. Through the first three quarters, the teams traded field goals, and the game was tied at 6-6. Michigan then scored 10 unanswered points in the fourth quarter. The game's only touchdown was scored on an 18-yard run by Gordon Bell. Rob Lytle was the game's leading gainer with 111 rushing yards on 20 carries.
- Illinois 42, Minnesota 23.
- Wisconsin 17, Purdue 14.
- Northwestern 30, Indiana 0.

==== October 18 ====
On October 18, 1975, the Big Ten teams played five conference games.

- Ohio State 56, Wisconsin 0.
- Michigan 69, Northwestern 0. Michigan defeated Northwestern, 69–0, before a crowd of 86,201 at Michigan Stadium in Ann Arbor. Despite playing its third string through most of the second half, Michigan's offense continued to score. Michigan tied a Big Ten record with 573 rushing yards with three backs exceeding 100 yards in the game: Harlan Huckleby (157); Rob Lytle (105); and Gordon Bell (100).
- Michigan State 38, Minnesota 15.
- Purdue 26, Illinois 24.
- Iowa 20, Indiana 10.

==== October 25 ====
On October 25, 1975, the Big Ten teams played five conference games.

- Ohio State 35, Purdue 6.
- Michigan 55, Indiana 7.
- Illinois 21, Michigan State 19.
- Wisconsin 17, Northwestern 14.
- Minnesota 31, Iowa 7.

==== November 1 ====
On November 1, 1975, the Big Ten teams played five conference games.

- Ohio State 24, Indiana 14.
- Michigan 28, Minnesota 21.
- Purdue 20, Michigan State 10.
- Wisconsin 18, Illinois 9.
- Iowa 24, Northwestern 21.

==== November 8 ====
On November 8, 1975, the Big Ten teams played five conference games.

- Ohio State 40, Illinois 3.
- Michigan 28, Purdue 0.
- Michigan State 14, Indiana 6.
- Iowa 45, Purdue 28.
- Minnesota 33, Northwestern 9.

==== November 15 ====
On November 15, 1975, the Big Ten teams played five conference games.

- Ohio State 38, Minnesota 6.
- Michigan 21, Illinois 15.
- Michigan State 47, Northwestern 14.
- Purdue 19, Iowa 18.
- Indiana 9, Wisconsin 9.

==== November 22 ====
On November 22, 1975, the Big Ten teams played five conference games.

- Ohio State 21, Michigan 14. Ohio State (ranked No. 1 in the AP Poll) defeated Michigan (ranked No. 4 in the AP Poll), 21-14, before an NCAA record crowd of 105,543 at Michigan Stadium in Ann Arbor, Michigan. Ohio State scored on a seven-yard pass from Cornelius Greene to Pete Johnson in the first quarter. From that point until midway through the fourth quarter, Michigan's defense held Ohio State to only one first down. Michigan tied the game at 7-7 in the second quarter on a trick play with running back Gordon Bell throwing an 11-yard touchdown pass to Jim Smith. Michigan took a 14-7 lead in the fourth quarter on a one-yard touchdown run by freshman quarterback Rick Leach. With 3:30 left in the game, Pete Johnson ran one yard for a touchdown to tie the game. Needing a victory to advance to the Rose Bowl, Michigan quarterback threw deep from his end zone on third down, and his pass was intercepted by Ray Griffin (Archie's brother) who returned the ball 29 yards to Michigan's three-yard line. Pete Johnson ran for a touchdown (his third of the game) on the next play. Michigan's defense held Heisman Trophy winner Archie Griffin to 46 yards on 19 carries. Michigan's running backs Gordon Bell and Rob Lytle rushed for 124 and 104 yards, respectively. After the game, Woody Hayes called it "the best comeback I've seen since I've been a coach."
- Michigan State 27, Iowa 23.
- Illinois 28, Northwestern 7.
- Purdue 9, Indiana 7.
- Minnesota 24, Wisconsin 3.

=== Bowl games ===
==== 1976 Rose Bowl ====
On January 1, 1976, Dick Vermeil's UCLA Bruins (ranked No. 11 in the AP Poll) defeated Ohio State (ranked No. 1), 23–10, before a crowd of 105,464 in the 1976 Rose Bowl in Pasadena, California. Ohio State had defeated UCLA, 41–20, in the regular season and came into the game as a 14-point favorite. Ohio State led, 3-0, at halftime, but Heisman Trophy winner Archie Griffin fractured a bone in his left hand on the third play of the game. UCLA rallied with 23 points in the second half. UCLA quarterback John Sciarra threw two touchdown passes to Wally Henry covering 16 and 67 yards. Ohio State cut the lead to 16-10 early in the fourth quarter, but Ohio State quarterback then threw two costly interceptions. Late in the game, UCLA's Wendell Tyler ran 54 yards for a touchdown; Tyler finished the game with 155 rushing yards.

==== 1976 Orange Bowl ====
On January 1, 1976, Oklahoma (ranked No. 3 in the AP Poll) defeated Michigan (ranked No. 5), 14–6, before a crowd of 80,307 in the 1976 Orange Bowl in Miami. Oklahoma took a 7-0 lead in the first quarter on a 39-yard end-around touchdown run by split end Billy Brooks. In the fourth quarter, Oklahoma quarterback Steve Davis ran 11 yards for a touchdown to extend the lead to 14-0. Midway through the fourth quarter, Michigan linebacker Dave Devich recovered an Oklahoma fumble at the Sooners' two-yard line. Gordon Bell then ran two yards for a touchdown to narrow Oklahoma's lead to 14-6. An attempted two-point conversion failed when Rick Leach was stopped short of the goal line. With its victory over Michigan, Oklahoma rose to No. 1 in the final AP and UPI polls and was the consensus national champion.

== Statistical leaders ==
=== Passing yards ===
1. Tony Dungy, Minnesota (1,515)
2. Randy Dean, Northwestern (1,315)
3. Kurt Steger, Illinois (1,136)
4. Cornelius Greene, Ohio State (1,066)
5. Charles Baggett, Michigan State (854)

=== Rushing yards ===
1. Archie Griffin, Ohio State (1,450)
2. Gordon Bell, Michigan (1,390)
3. Billy Marek, Wisconsin (1,281)
4. Greg Boykin, Northwestern (1,105)
5. Courtney Snyder, Indiana (1,103)

=== Receiving yards ===
1. Scott Yelvington, Northwestern (686)
2. Jim Smith, Michigan (553)
3. Ron Kullas • Minnesota (545)
4. Mike Jones • Minnesota (473)
5. Paul Beery • Purdue (454)

=== Total offense ===
1. Tony Dungy, Minnesota (1,759)
2. Cornelius Greene, Ohio State (1,584)
3. Charles Baggett, Michigan State (1,499)
4. Archie Griffin, Ohio State (1,450)
5. Gordon Bell, Michigan (1,401)

=== Passing efficiency rating ===
1. Tony Dungy, Minnesota (120.8)
2. Kurt Steger, Illinois (104.7)
3. Randy Dean, Northwestern (103.7)

=== Rushing yards per attempt ===
1. Jim Jensen, Iowa (5.8)
2. Archie Griffin, Ohio State (5.5)
3. Rob Lytle, Michigan (5.4)
4. Dave Schick, Iowa (5.4)
5. Lonnie Perrin, Illinois (5.3)

=== Yards per reception ===
1. Jim Smith, Michigan (23.0)
2. Trent Smock, Indiana (17.1)
3. Paul Beery, Purdue (16.8)
4. Mike Jones, Minnesota (16.3)
5. Brian Baschnagel, Ohio State (15.1)

=== Points scored ===
1. Pete Johnson, Ohio State (156)
2. Gordon Bell, Michigan (84)
3. Billy Marek, Wisconsin (78)
4. Rob Lytle, Michigan (60)
5. Greg Boykin, Northwestern (54)

== Awards and honors ==
=== All-Big Ten honors ===
The following players were picked by the Associated Press (AP) and/or the United Press International (UPI) as first-team players on the 1975 All-Big Ten Conference football team.

Offense

Position	Name	Team	Selectors
Quarterback	Cornelius Greene	Ohio State	AP, UPI
Running back	Gordon Bell	Michigan	AP, UPI
Running back	Archie Griffin	Ohio State	AP, UPI
Running back	Billy Marek	Wisconsin	AP
Running back	Pete Johnson	Ohio State	UPI
Wide receiver	Jim Smith	Michigan	AP, UPI
Tight end	Joe Smalzer	Illinois	AP
Tight end	Mike Cobb	Michigan State	UPI
Center	Paul Jasinskis	Northwestern	AP
Center	Jim Czirr	Michigan	UPI
Guard	Terry Stieve	Wisconsin	AP, UPI
Guard	Ted Smith	Ohio State	AP
Guard	Joe Devlin	Iowa	UPI
Tackle	Scott Dannelley	Ohio State	AP
Tackle	Rod Walters	Iowa	AP
Tackle	Dennis Lick	Wisconsin	UPI
Tackle	Chris Ward	Ohio State	UPI

Defense

Position	Name	Team	Selectors
Defensive end	Dan Jilek	Michigan	AP, UPI
Defensive end	Bob Brudzinski	Ohio State	UPI
Defensive tackle	Nick Buonamici	Ohio State	AP, UPI
Defensive tackle	Keith Simons	Minnesota	AP
Defensive tackle	Greg Morton	Michigan	UPI
Nose guard	Tim Davis	Michigan	AP, UPI
Linebacker	Donnie Thomas	Indiana	AP, UPI
Linebacker	Ed Thompson	Ohio State	AP
Linebacker	Blane Smith	Purdue	AP
Linebacker	Calvin O'Neal	Michigan	UPI
Defensive back	Don Dufek	Michigan	AP [linebacker], UPI
Defensive back	Tim Fox	Ohio State	AP, UPI
Defensive back	Tom Hannon	Michigan State	AP, UPI
Defensive back	Pete Shaw	Northwestern	AP, UPI

=== All-American honors ===
At the end of the 1975 season, Big Ten players secured four of the consensus first-team picks for the 1975 College Football All-America Team. The Big Ten's consensus All-Americans were:

Position	Name	Team	Selectors
Running back	Archie Griffin	Ohio State	AFCA, AP, UPI, FN, NEA, TSN, Time, WCFF
Defensive back	Tim Fox	Ohio State	AFCA, FWAA, UPI, NEA, TSN, Time, WCFF
Offensive tackle	Dennis Lick	Wisconsin	AFCA, UPI, NEA, TSN, Time, WCFF
Offensive guard	Ted Smith	Ohio State	AP, FWAA, FN, NEA

Other Big Ten players who were named first-team All-Americans by at least one selector were:

Position	Name	Team	Selectors
Defensive back	Don Dufek	Michigan	AFCA, FWAA, FN, WCFF
Offensive tackle	Rod Walters	Iowa	NEA [guard], TSN, Time
Defensive tackle	Ken Novak	Purdue	FWAA, TSN, Time
Offensive guard	Joe Devlin	Iowa	TSN, Time
Punter	Tom Skladany	Ohio State	FWAA, FN
Quarterback	Cornelius Greene	Ohio State	FN

=== Other awards ===
Ohio State running back Archie Griffin won the 1975 Heisman Trophy. Michigan running back Gordon Bell finished eighth in the Heisman voting.

Ohio State's Woody Hayes was named Big Ten Coach of the Year.

== 1976 NFL draft ==
The 1976 NFL draft was held in New York on April 8–9, 1976. The following players were among the first 100 picks:

Name	Position	Team	Round	Overall pick
Mike Pruitt	Running back	Purdue	1	7
Dennis Lick	Offensive tackle	Wisconsin	1	8
Wayne Walters	Guard	Iowa	1	14
Ken Novak	Defensive tackle	Purdue	1	20
Tim Fox	Safety	Ohio State	1	21
Archie Griffin	Running back	Ohio State	1	24
Jim Jensen	Running Back	Iowa	2	40
Ken Long	Guard	Purdue	2	44
Joe Devlin	Tackle	Iowa	2	52
Keith Simons	Defensive tackle	Minnesota	3	63
Brian Baschnagel	Wide receiver	Ohio State	3	66
