= 1975 Ohio State Buckeyes football team =

American college football season

1975 Ohio State Buckeyes football
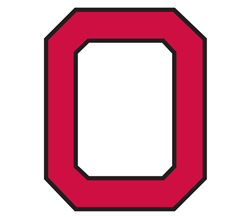

Big Ten champion

Rose Bowl, L 10–23 vs. UCLA
- Conference: Big Ten Conference

Ranking
- Coaches: No. 4
- AP: No. 4
- Record: 11–1 (8–0 Big Ten)
- Head coach: Woody Hayes (25th season)
- Offensive coordinator: Alex Gibbs (1st season)
- Defensive coordinator: George Hill (5th season)
- MVP: Cornelius Greene
- Captains: Brian Baschnagel; Tim Fox; Archie Griffin; Ken Kuhn
- Home stadium: Ohio Stadium

1975 Big Ten Conference football standings
	Conf.					Overall
Team	W		L		T	W		L		T
No. 4 Ohio State $	8	–	0	–	0	11	–	1	–	0
No. 8 Michigan	7	–	1	–	0	8	–	2	–	2
Michigan State	4	–	4	–	0	7	–	4	–	0
Illinois	4	–	4	–	0	5	–	6	–	0
Purdue	4	–	4	–	0	4	–	7	–	0
Wisconsin	3	–	4	–	1	4	–	6	–	1
Minnesota	3	–	5	–	0	6	–	5	–	0
Iowa	3	–	5	–	0	3	–	8	–	0
Northwestern	2	–	6	–	0	3	–	8	–	0
Indiana	1	–	6	–	1	2	–	8	–	1
$ – Conference champion; Rankings from AP Poll

The 1975 Ohio State Buckeyes football team was an American football team that represented the Ohio State University as a member of the Big Ten Conference during the 1975 Big Ten season. In their 25th year under head coach Woody Hayes, the Buckeyes compiled an 11–1 record (8–0 in conference games), won the Big Ten championship, and outscored opponents by a total of 374 to 79. Against ranked opponents during the regular season, they defeated No. 11 Michigan State, No. 7 Penn State, No. 13 UCLA, and No. 4 Michigan. The Buckeyes concluded the season in a rematch with UCLA, losing by a 23–10 score in the 1976 Rose Bowl. The Buckeyes, who had been ranked No. 1 prior to the Rose Bowl, dropped to No. 4 in the final AP and UPI polls.

The Buckeyes gained an average of 290.0 rushing yards and 83.1 passing yards per game. On defense, they held opponents to 139.8 rushing yards and 90.0 passing yards per game.

Running back Archie Griffin rushed for 1,357 yards (5.5 yards per carry) and won the Heisman Trophy for the second consecutive year, the only repeat winner in Heisman history. Quarterback Cornelius Greene tallied 976 passing yards and 473 rushing yards and won the Chicago Tribune Silver Football as the most valuable player in the Big Ten. Fullback Pete Johnson tallied 989 rushing yards and led the team in scoring with 156 points on 26 touchdowns. Three Ohio State players won consensus All-America honors: Griffin; offensive guard Ted Smith; and defensive back Tim Fox. Punter Tom Skladany won first-team All-America honors from the Football Writers Association of America. Eleven Ohio State players received first-team honors on the 1975 All-Big Ten Conference football team.

The team played its home games at Ohio Stadium in Columbus, Ohio.

== Schedule ==
Date	Time	Opponent	Rank	Site	TV	Result	Attendance	Source
September 13	4:00 p.m.	at No. 11 Michigan State	No. 3	Spartan Stadium; East Lansing, MI	ABC	W 21–0	80,383	
September 20	1:30 p.m.	No. 7 Penn State*	No. 3	Ohio Stadium; Columbus, OH (rivalry)		W 17–9	88,093	
September 27	1:30 p.m.	North Carolina*	No. 2	Ohio Stadium; Columbus, OH		W 32–7	87,750	
October 4	9:00 p.m.	at No. 13 UCLA*	No. 2	Los Angeles Memorial Coliseum; Los Angeles, CA	ABC	W 41–20	55,482	
October 11	1:30 p.m.	Iowa	No. 1	Ohio Stadium; Columbus, OH		W 49–0	87,826	
October 18	1:30 p.m.	Wisconsin	No. 1	Ohio Stadium; Columbus, OH		W 56–0	87,820	
October 25	2:30 p.m.	at Purdue	No. 1	Ross–Ade Stadium; West Lafayette, IN		W 35–6	69,405	
November 1	1:30 p.m.	Indiana	No. 1	Ohio Stadium; Columbus, OH		W 24–14	87,835	
November 8	2:00 p.m.	at Illinois	No. 1	Memorial Stadium; Champaign, IL (Illibuck)		W 40–3	67,571	
November 15	1:30 p.m.	Minnesota	No. 1	Ohio Stadium; Columbus, OH		W 38–6	87,817	
November 22	1:00 p.m.	at No. 4 Michigan	No. 1	Michigan Stadium; Ann Arbor, MI (rivalry)	ABC	W 21–14	105,543	
January 1, 1976	5:00 p.m.	vs. No. 11 UCLA*	No. 1	Rose Bowl; Pasadena, CA (Rose Bowl)	NBC	L 10–23	105,464	
*Non-conference game; Rankings from AP Poll released prior to the game; All times are in Eastern time

== Game summaries ==
=== Michigan State ===
Ohio State Buckeyes (0–0) at Michigan State Spartans

Quarter	1	2	3	4	Total
Ohio St	0	7	7	7	21
Michigan St	0	0	0	0	0

at Spartan Stadium • East Lansing, Michigan

- Date: September 13
- Game weather: Partly sunny • Mid 50s • Wind W–NW 10 miles per hour (16 km/h; 8.7 kn) to 20 miles per hour (32 km/h; 17 kn)
- Game attendance: 80,383
- TV: ABC

Game information

Ohio St

- Greene
  3/7, 85 Yds, TD, INT
- Griffin
  29 Rush, 108 Yds
- Willis
  2 Rec, 82 Yds, TD

Michigan St

- Baggett
  5/9, 67 Yds, 3 INT
- Jackson
  20 Rush, 58 Yds
- Fortney
  3 Rec, 35 Yds

Scoring summary

Quarter	Time	Drive			Team	Scoring information	Score	
Quarter	Time	Plays	Yards	TOP	Team	Scoring information	OSU	MSU
2	1:16	8	57		Ohio St	Johnson 6-yard touchdown run, Klaban kick good	7	0
3	6:52	6	76		Ohio St	Willis 64-yard touchdown reception from Grenne, Klaban kick good	14	0
4	14:56	4	30		Ohio St	Johnson 9-yard touchdown run, Klaban kick good	21	0
"TOP" = time of possession. For other American football terms, see Glossary of American football.							21	0

=== Penn State ===
Team	1	2	3	4	Total
Penn St	3	3	3	0	9
• Ohio St	10	0	0	7	17

- Date: September 20
- Location: Ohio Stadium
- Game attendance: 88,093

Scoring summary
1		OHST	Johnson 1 yard run (Klaban kick)	Ohio St 7–0
1		PSU	Bahr 55 yard field goal	Ohio St 7–3
1		OHST	Klaban 45 yard field goal	Ohio St 10–3
2		PSU	Bahr 31 yard field goal	Ohio St 10–6
3		PSU	Bahr 25 yard field goal	Ohio St 10–9
4	5:05	OHST	Johnson 11 yard run (Klaban kick)	Ohio St 17–9

=== UCLA ===
Team	1	2	3	4	Total
• Ohio State	7	21	10	3	41
UCLA	7	0	7	6	20

- Date: October 5
- Location: Los Angeles Memorial Coliseum, Los Angeles
- Game attendance: 55,482
- TV announcers (ABC): Keith Jackson, Bud Wilkinson

Scoring summary
1	UCLA	Sarpy 13-yard pass from Sciarra (White kick)	UCLA 7-0
1	OSU	Greene 2-yard run (Klaban kick)	Tied 7-7
2	OSU	Johnson 3-yard run (Klaban kick)	OSU 14-7
2	OSU	Johnson 2-yard run (Klaban kick)	OSU 21-7
2	OSU	Greene 17-yard run (Klaban kick)	OSU 28-7
3	OSU	A. Griffin 17-yard run (Klaban kick)	OSU 35-7
3	OSU	Klaban 34-yard field goal	OSU 38-7
3	UCLA	Ayers 2-yard run (White kick)	OSU 38-14
4	UCLA	Ayers 1-yard run (kick failed)	OSU 38-20
4	OSU	Klaban 42-yard field goal	OSU 41-20

=== Purdue ===
Team	1	2	3	4	Total
• Ohio State	14	7	7	7	35
Purdue	3	3	0	0	6

- Date: October 25
- Location: Ross–Ade Stadium, West Lafayette, IN

Scoring summary
1	OSU	Pete Johnson 60-yard run (Tom Klaban kick)	OSU 7-0
1	PUR	Steve Schmidt 22-yard field goal	OSU 7-3
1	OSU	Pete Johnson 3-yard run (Tom Klaban kick)	OSU 14-3
2	PUR	Steve Schmidt 27-yard field goal	OSU 14-6
2	OSU	Brian Baschnagel 22-yard pass from Cornelius Greene (Tom Klaban kick)	OSU 21-6
3	OSU	Lenny Willis 41-yard pass from Cornelius Green (Tom Klaban kick)	OSU 28-6
4	OSU	Cornelius Greene 28-yard run (Tom Klaban kick)	OSU 35-6

Archie Griffin broke Cornell's Ed Marinaro NCAA career rushing record with a 23-yard run up the middle in the fourth quarter.

=== Minnesota ===
Team	1	2	3	4	Total
Minnesota	0	0	6	0	6
• Ohio St	3	14	0	21	38

- Date: November 15
- Location: Ohio Stadium
- Game start: 1:30 p.m. EST
- Game attendance: 87,817

Scoring summary
Q1	OHST	Klaban 29 yard field goal	OHST 3–0
Q2	OHST	Greene 14 yard run (Klaban kick)	OHST 10–0
Q2	OHST	Griffin 19 yard run (Klaban kick)	OHST 17–0
Q3	MINN	Barlow 5 yard pass from Dungy (pass failed)	OHST 17–6
Q4	OHST	Johnson 8 yard run (Klaban kick)	OHST 24–6
Q4	OHST	Greene 31 yard run (Klaban kick)	OHST 31–6
Q4	OHST	Baschnagel 21 yard run (Klaban kick)	OHST 38–6

=== Michigan ===
Ohio State Buckeyes at Michigan Wolverines

Quarter	1	2	3	4	Total
Ohio St	7	0	0	14	21
Michigan	0	7	0	7	14

at Michigan Stadium, Ann Arbor, Michigan

- Date: November 22, 1975
- Game weather: Clear, 36 °F (2 °C)
- Game attendance: 105,543
- TV announcers (ABC): Keith Jackson, Bud Wilkinson

Game information

First quarter

- OSU – Pete Johnson 7-yard pass from Cornelius Greene (Tom Klaban kick), 4:43. Ohio St 7–0. Drive: 15 plays, 63 yards.

Second quarter

- MICH – Jim Smith 11-yard pass from Gordon Bell (Bob Wood kick), 0:24. Tie 7–7. Drive: 11 plays, 80 yards.

Fourth quarter

- MICH – Rick Leach 1-yard run (Bob Wood kick), 7:11. Michigan 14–7. Drive: 10 plays, 43 yards.
- OSU – Pete Johnson 1-yard run (Tom Klaban kick), 3:18. Tie 14–14. Drive: 11 plays, 80 yards.
- OSU – Pete Johnson 3-yard run (Tom Klaban kick), 2:19. Ohio St 21–14. Drive: 1 play, 3 yards.

Top passers

- OSU – Cornelius Greene – 7/16, 84 yards, TD, 2 INT
- MICH – Rick Leach – 7/20, 102 yards, 3 INT

Top rushers

- OSU – Pete Johnson – 18 rushes, 52 yards, 2 TD
- MICH – Gordon Bell – 21 rushes, 124 yards

Top receivers

- OSU – Lenny Willis – 2 receptions, 32 yards
- MICH – Jim Smith – 3 receptions, 31 yards, TD

== Personnel ==
=== Coaching staff ===
- Woody Hayes - Head Coach (25th year)
- George Chaump - Offense (8th year)
- George Hill - Defensive Coordinator (5th year)
- Charles Clausen - Defense (5th year)
- Alex Gibbs - Offensive Coordinator/ Offensive Line (1st year)
- Mickey Jackson - (2nd year)
- John Mummey - Quarterbacks (7th year)
- Ralph Staub - (6th year)
- Dick Walker - Defensive Backs (7th year)
- Jeff Kaplan - 'brain coach' & counselor (3rd year)

=== Roster ===
1975 Ohio State Buckeyes football team roster
Players
Coaches
Offense

Pos.	#	Name	Class
QB		Cornelius Greene
RB	45	Archie Griffin	Sr
FB		Pete Johnson
QB	8	Rod Gerald	Fr

Defense

Pos.	#	Name	Class
DB		Tim Fox
DB		Ray Griffin

Special teams

Pos.	#	Name	Class
K		Tom Klaban

Head coach

- Woody Hayes

Coordinators/assistant coaches

Legend

- (C) Team captain
- (S) Suspended
- (I) Ineligible
- Injured
- Redshirt

=== Depth chart ===
Defense

FS
Tim Fox
Duncan Griffin
⋅

WLB	SLB
Ed Thompson	Ken Kuhn
Dave Adkins	Tom Cousineau
⋅	⋅

SS
Ray Griffin
Joe Allegro
⋅

CB
Craig Cassady
Max Midlam
⋅

DE	DT	NT	DT	DE
Bob Brudzinski	Nick Buonamici	Aaron Brown	Eddie Beamon	Pat Curto
Kelton Dansler	Mark Sullivan	Mark Lang	Byron Cato	⋅
⋅	Tyrone Harris	⋅	⋅	⋅

CB
Bruce Ruhl
Lenny Mills
⋅

Offense

SE
Lenny Willis
Herman Jones
⋅

LT	LG	C	RG	RT
Chris Ward	Ted Smith	Rick Applegate	Bill Lukens	Scott Dannelley
Lou Pietrini	Jim Savoca	Ron Ayers	⋅	Garth Cox
⋅	⋅	Doug Porter	⋅	⋅

TE
Larry Kain
Jimmy Moore
Greg Storer

WB
Brian Baschnagel
Jimmy Harrell
⋅

QB
Cornelius Greene
Rod Gerald
Jim Pacenta

FB
Pete Johnson
Lou Williott
⋅

Special teams
PK Tom Klaban
P Tom Skladany
P Mike Keeton
KR Lenny Willis

RB
Archie Griffin
Jeff Logan
Woody Roach

== Awards and honors ==
- Archie Griffin, Heisman Trophy

== 1976 NFL draftees ==
Player	Round	Pick	Position	NFL club
Tim Fox	1	21	Defensive back	New England Patriots
Archie Griffin	1	24	Running back	Cincinnati Bengals
Brian Baschnagel	3	66	Wide receiver	Chicago Bears
Leonard Willis	4	118	Wide receiver	Minnesota Vikings
Ken Kuhn	7	205	Linebacker	Cincinnati Bengals
Craig Cassady	8	213	Defensive back	New Orleans Saints
Tom Klaban	10	287	Kicker	Cincinnati Bengals
Cornelius Greene	11	317	Quarterback	Dallas Cowboys
Larry Kain	13	375	Tight end	Pittsburgh Steelers
Pat Curto	16	441	Linebacker	Atlanta Falcons
Scott Dannelley	17	482	Guard	Cincinnati Bengals
