= 1975 Wisconsin Badgers football team =

American college football season

1975 Wisconsin Badgers football
- Conference: Big Ten Conference
- Record: 4–6–1 (3–4–1 Big Ten)
- Head coach: John Jardine (6th season)
- Defensive coordinator: Lew Stueck (6th season)
- Base defense: 5–2
- MVP: Billy Marek
- Captains: Terry Stieve; Steve Wagner
- Home stadium: Camp Randall Stadium

1975 Big Ten Conference football standings
	Conf.					Overall
Team	W		L		T	W		L		T
No. 4 Ohio State $	8	–	0	–	0	11	–	1	–	0
No. 8 Michigan	7	–	1	–	0	8	–	2	–	2
Michigan State	4	–	4	–	0	7	–	4	–	0
Illinois	4	–	4	–	0	5	–	6	–	0
Purdue	4	–	4	–	0	4	–	7	–	0
Wisconsin	3	–	4	–	1	4	–	6	–	1
Minnesota	3	–	5	–	0	6	–	5	–	0
Iowa	3	–	5	–	0	3	–	8	–	0
Northwestern	2	–	6	–	0	3	–	8	–	0
Indiana	1	–	6	–	1	2	–	8	–	1
$ – Conference champion; Rankings from AP Poll

The 1975 Wisconsin Badgers football team was an American football team that represented the University of Wisconsin as a member of the Big Ten Conference during the 1975 Big Ten season. In their sixth year under head coach John Jardine, the Badgers compiled a 4–6–1 record (3–4–1 in conference games), finished in sixth place in the Big Ten, and were outscored by a total of 269 to 174.

The Badgers gained an average of 86.4 passing yards and 223.6 rushing yards per game. On defense, they gave up an average of 65.2 passing yards and 317.3 rushing yards per game. The team's individual statistical leaders included: quarterback Mike Carroll (708 passing yards); running back Billy Marek (1,281 rushing yards); and wide receiver Ray Bailey (18 receptions for 223 yards).

Bohlig and Mark Zakula were the team captains. Bohlig was selected as the team's most valuable player. Five Wisconsin players received first- or second-team All-Big Ten honors from the Associated Press (AP) or United Press International (UPI): Marek at running back (AP-1, UPI-1); Dennis Lick at offensive tackle (AP-1, UPI-1); Jack Novak at end/receiver (AP-2, UPI-1); Terry Stieve at offensive guard (AP-2, UPI-2); and Rick Jakious at linebacker (AP-2).

The Badgers played their home games at Camp Randall Stadium in Madison, Wisconsin.

== Schedule ==
Date	Opponent	Site	Result	Attendance	Source
September 13	No. 2 Michigan	Camp Randall Stadium; Madison, WI	L 6–23	79,022	
September 20	South Dakota*	Camp Randall Stadium; Madison, WI	W 48–7	65,566	
September 27	at No. 5 Missouri*	Faurot Field; Columbia, MO	L 21–27	62,222	
October 4	Kansas*	Camp Randall Stadium; Madison, WI	L 7–41	76,097	
October 11	at Purdue	Ross–Ade Stadium; West Lafayette, IN	W 17–14	62,406	
October 18	at No. 1 Ohio State	Ohio Stadium; Columbus, OH	L 0–56	87,820	
October 25	Northwestern^{†}	Camp Randall Stadium; Madison, WI	W 17–14	78,902	
November 1	Illinois	Camp Randall Stadium; Madison, WI	W 18–9	78,868	
November 8	at Iowa	Kinnick Stadium; Iowa City, IA (rivalry)	L 28–45	54,650	
November 15	Indiana	Camp Randall Stadium; Madison, WI	T 9–9	65,317	
November 22	at Minnesota	Memorial Stadium; Minneapolis, MN (rivalry)	L 3–24	37,578	
*Non-conference game; ^{†}Homecoming; Rankings from AP Poll released prior to the game

== Game summaries ==
=== Northwestern ===
Team	1	2	3	4	Total
Northwestern	7	7	0	0	14
• Wisconsin	3	7	7	0	17

- Date: October 25
- Location: Camp Randall Stadium, Madison, WI
- Game attendance: 78,902

Scoring summary
1	NW	Boykin 1 yard run (Mirkopulos kick)	NW 7-0
1	WIS	La Bun 50 yard field goal	NW 7-3
2	WIS	Billy Marek 1 yard run (Lamla kick)	WIS 10-7
2	NW	Yelvington 5 yard pass from Dean (Mirkopulos kick)	NW 14-10
3	WIS	Billy Marek 54 yard run (Lamla kick)	WIS 17-14

Billy Marek became the 30th player in NCAA history to rush for over 3,000 yards in a career.

== Roster ==
1975 Wisconsin Badgers football team roster
Players
Coaches
Offense

Pos.	#	Name	Class
WR	81	Ray Bailey	Jr
WR	82	Tom Belter	Sr
FB	30	Larry Canada	Jr
QB	15	Mike Carroll	Jr
QB	17	Anthony Dudley	Fr
TE	85	Ron Egloff	Jr
RB	38	Rufus Floyd	Sr
G	56	Kevin Gassner	Sr
QB	11	Charles Green	Fr
RB	22	Duane Johnson	Sr
OT	74	Tom Kaltenberg	So
QB	9	Dan Kopina	Sr
WR	40	Bob Leppla	Sr
OT	70	Dennis Lick	Sr
G	60	Steve Lick	So
G	63	Terry Lyons	Jr
RB	26	Billy Marek	Sr
RB	25	Ira Matthews	Fr
C	58	Al Minter	So
RB	33	Mike Morgan	So
C	53	Joe Norwick	Sr
OT	78	John Reimer	Sr
WR	44	Randy Rose	Jr
OT	71	Karel Schliksbier	Jr
FB	32	Ken Starch	Sr
G	68	Terry Stieve (C)	Sr
TE	89	Jeff Walsh	So

Defense

Pos.	#	Name	Class
DT	75	Dave Anderson	Sr
DT	79	Bill Brandt	Sr
DE	82	Mike Burt	Fr
S	41	Rick Christian	Jr
DE	7	Pat Collins	Jr
DT	55	Dave Cotteau	Jr
LB	14	Dave Crossen	Fr
S	22	Terry Cunningham	Jr
DT	57	Bob Czechowicz	So
MG	94	Tom Czechowicz	Jr
DB	23	Ken Dixon	Fr
DB	4	Bill Drummond	Sr
S	21	Scott Erdmann	Fr
LB	49	Jim Franz	Sr
CB	8	Greg Gordon	Fr
MG	54	Mike Grice	So
CB	37	Lawrence Johnson	Fr
DB	28	Rex Jones	Sr
LB	43	Mike Kelly	Jr
LB	37	Gary Little	So
S	25	Rich Lucas	Sr
CB	12	Greg Lewis	Sr
CB	5	Tim McConnell	Jr
DT	62	Andy Michuda	Jr
DT	76	John Rasmussen	Jr
CB	8	Ken Simmons	Sr
LB	47	Scott Sklare	Jr
DE	35	Dennis Stejskal	So
CB	6	Steve Wagner (C)	Sr
LB	50	John Zimmerman	Sr

Special teams

Pos.	#	Name	Class
K	1	Vladimir LaBun	Sr
K	2	Vince Lamia	Jr
P	3	Dick Milaeger	So

Head coach

- John Jardine

Coordinators/assistant coaches

- Lew Stueck – Defensive Coordinator/Linebackers
- Gary Blackney – Defensive Backs
- George Chryst – Offensive Line
- Bob Lee – Wide Receivers
- Charlie McBride – Offensive Line
- Bob Spoo – Quarterbacks
- Mike Stock – Running Backs
- Dick Teteak – Defensive Line
- LaVern Van Dyke – Administrative Assistant

Legend

- (C) Team captain
- (S) Suspended
- (I) Ineligible
- Injured
- Redshirt

== 1976 NFL draft ==
Player	Position	Round	Pick	NFL club
Dennis Lick	Offensive tackle	1	8	Chicago Bears
Steve Wagner	Defensive back	5	133	Minnesota Vikings
Terry Stieve	Guard	6	160	New Orleans Saints
