= 1975 Michigan State Spartans football team =

American college football season

1975 Michigan State Spartans football
- Conference: Big Ten Conference
- Record: 7–4 (4–4 Big Ten)
- Head coach: Denny Stolz (3rd season)
- Offensive coordinator: Andy MacDonald (3rd season)
- MVP: Levi Jackson
- Captains: Charlie Baggett; Gregory Schaum
- Home stadium: Spartan Stadium

1975 Big Ten Conference football standings
| | Conf. | | | | | Overall |
| Team | W | | L | | T | W | | L | | T |
|---|---|---|---|---|---|---|---|---|---|---|
| No. 4 Ohio State $ | 8 | – | 0 | – | 0 | 11 | – | 1 | – | 0 |
| No. 8 Michigan | 7 | – | 1 | – | 0 | 8 | – | 2 | – | 2 |
| Michigan State | 4 | – | 4 | – | 0 | 7 | – | 4 | – | 0 |
| Illinois | 4 | – | 4 | – | 0 | 5 | – | 6 | – | 0 |
| Purdue | 4 | – | 4 | – | 0 | 4 | – | 7 | – | 0 |
| Wisconsin | 3 | – | 4 | – | 1 | 4 | – | 6 | – | 1 |
| Minnesota | 3 | – | 5 | – | 0 | 6 | – | 5 | – | 0 |
| Iowa | 3 | – | 5 | – | 0 | 3 | – | 8 | – | 0 |
| Northwestern | 2 | – | 6 | – | 0 | 3 | – | 8 | – | 0 |
| Indiana | 1 | – | 6 | – | 1 | 2 | – | 8 | – | 1 |
$ – Conference champion; Rankings from AP Poll

The 1975 Michigan State Spartans football team was an American football team that represented Michigan State University as a member of the Big Ten Conference during the 1975 Big Ten football season. In their third and final season under head coach Denny Stolz, the Spartans compiled a 7–4 record (4–4 in conference games), finished in a three-way tie for third place in the Big Ten, and outscored opponents by a total of 222 to 167. In four games against ranked opponents, they lost to No. 3 Ohio State and No. 8 Michigan and defeated No. 19 Notre Dame and No. 8 Notre Dame.

On offense, the Spartans gained an average of 264.9 rushing yards and 82.9 passing yards per game. On defense, they gave up 191.2 rushing yards and 102.2 passing yards per game. The individual statistical leaders included quarterback Charlie Baggett with 854 passing yards, Levi Jackson with 1,063 rushing yards, and Eugene Byrd with 10 receptions for 266 receiving yards. Levi Jackson was selected as the team's most valuable player.

Two Michigan State players were selected by the Associated Press (AP) and/or the United Press International (UPI) as first-team players on the 1975 All-Big Ten Conference football team: tight end Mike Cobb (AP-2, UPI-1); and defensive back Tommy Hannon (AP-1, UPI-1).

Michigan State was placed on three years of probation in January 1976 for recruiting and other rules violations. Stolz was asked to resign as the team's head coach in March 1976.

The team played its home games at Spartan Stadium in East Lansing, Michigan.

== Schedule ==
| Date | Opponent | Rank | Site | Result | Attendance | Source |
|---|---|---|---|---|---|---|
| September 13 | No. 3 Ohio State | No. 11 | Spartan Stadium; East Lansing, MI | L 0–21 | 80,383 | |
| September 20 | No. 19 Miami (OH)* | | Spartan Stadium; East Lansing, MI | W 14–13 | 61,444 | |
| September 27 | NC State* | | Spartan Stadium; East Lansing, MI | W 37–15 | 59,111 | |
| October 4 | at No. 8 Notre Dame* | | Notre Dame Stadium; Notre Dame, IN (rivalry) | W 10–3 | 59,075 | |
| October 11 | No. 8 Michigan | No. 15 | Spartan Stadium; East Lansing, MI (rivalry) | L 6–16 | 79,776 | |
| October 18 | at Minnesota | No. 17 | Memorial Stadium; Minneapolis, MN | W 38–15 | 39,202 | |
| October 25 | Illinois^{†} | No. 16 | Spartan Stadium; East Lansing, MI | L 19–21 | 66,223 | |
| November 1 | at Purdue | | Ross–Ade Stadium; West Lafayette, IN | L 10–20 | 57,104 | |
| November 8 | at Indiana | | Memorial Stadium; Bloomington, IN (rivalry) | W 14–6 | 31,930 | |
| November 15 | Northwestern | | Spartan Stadium; East Lansing, MI | W 47–14 | 54,432 | |
| November 22 | at Iowa | | Kinnick Stadium; Iowa City, IA | W 27–23 | 42,300 | |
*Non-conference game; ^{†}Homecoming; Rankings from AP Poll released prior to the game

== Roster ==
1975 Michigan State Spartans football team roster
Players
Coaches
Offense

| Pos. | # | Name | Class |
|---|---|---|---|
| QB | 16 | Charlie Baggett | Sr |
| TE | 89 | Mike Cobb | Jr |
| RB | 48 | Jim Earley | So |
| WR | 21 | Dane Fortney | Sr |
| WR | | Kirk Gibson | Fr |

Defense

| Pos. | # | Name | Class |
|---|---|---|---|
| DT | 88 | Larry Bethea | So |
| DB | 45 | Tom Hannon | Jr |
| DT | 47 | Mel Land | So |
| LB | 37 | Paul Rudzinski | So |
| DT | 95 | Greg Schaum | Sr |

Special teams

| Pos. | # | Name | Class |
|---|---|---|---|
| K | 2 | Tom Birney | So |
| K | 8 | Hans Nielsen | So |

Head coach

- Denny Stolz

Coordinators/assistant coaches

Legend

- (C) Team captain
- (S) Suspended
- (I) Ineligible
- Injured
- Redshirt

== Game summaries ==
=== Notre Dame ===
Michigan State at #8 Notre Dame

| Team | 1 | 2 | 3 | 4 | Total |
|---|---|---|---|---|---|
| • Michigan State | 0 | 0 | 3 | 7 | 10 |
| Notre Dame | 0 | 0 | 0 | 3 | 3 |

- Date: October 4
- Location: Notre Dame Stadium, South Bend, IN
- Game attendance: 59,075

Scoring summary
| 3 | | MSU | Nielsen 37 yard field goal | MSU 3-0 |
| 4 | | ND | Reeve 35 yard field goal | Tied 3-3 |
| 4 | 3:50 | MSU | Levi Jackson 4 yard run (Nielsen kick) | MSU 10-3 |
