= 1975 Purdue Boilermakers football team =

American college football season

1975 Purdue Boilermakers football
- Conference: Big Ten Conference
- Record: 4–7 (4–4 Big Ten)
- Head coach: Alex Agase (3rd season)
- MVP: Mike Pruitt
- Captains: Ken Long; Ken Novak; Mike Pruitt
- Home stadium: Ross–Ade Stadium

1975 Big Ten Conference football standings
	Conf.					Overall
Team	W		L		T	W		L		T
No. 4 Ohio State $	8	–	0	–	0	11	–	1	–	0
No. 8 Michigan	7	–	1	–	0	8	–	2	–	2
Michigan State	4	–	4	–	0	7	–	4	–	0
Illinois	4	–	4	–	0	5	–	6	–	0
Purdue	4	–	4	–	0	4	–	7	–	0
Wisconsin	3	–	4	–	1	4	–	6	–	1
Minnesota	3	–	5	–	0	6	–	5	–	0
Iowa	3	–	5	–	0	3	–	8	–	0
Northwestern	2	–	6	–	0	3	–	8	–	0
Indiana	1	–	6	–	1	2	–	8	–	1
$ – Conference champion; Rankings from AP Poll

The 1975 Purdue Boilermakers football team represented Purdue University in the 1975 Big Ten Conference football season. Led by third-year head coach Alex Agase, the Boilermakers compiled an overall record of 4–7 with a mark of 4–4 in conference play, placing in a three-way tie for third in the Big Ten. Purdue played home games at Ross–Ade Stadium in West Lafayette, Indiana.

== Schedule ==
Date	Opponent	Site	Result	Attendance	Source
September 13	at Northwestern	Dyche Stadium; Evanston, IL	L 25–31	22,000	
September 20	No. 9 Notre Dame*	Ross–Ade Stadium; West Lafayette, IN (rivalry)	L 0–17	69,795	
September 27	at No. 3 USC*	Los Angeles Memorial Coliseum; Los Angeles, CA	L 6–19	56,170	
October 4	Miami (OH)*	Ross–Ade Stadium; West Lafayette, IN	L 3–14	52,309	
October 11	Wisconsin^{†}	Ross–Ade Stadium; West Lafayette, IN	L 14–17	62,406	
October 18	at Illinois	Memorial Stadium; Champaign, IL (rivalry)	W 26–24	61,204	
October 25	No. 1 Ohio State	Ross–Ade Stadium; West Lafayette, IN	L 6–35	69,405	
November 1	Michigan State	Ross–Ade Stadium; West Lafayette, IN	W 20–10	57,104	
November 8	at No. 6 Michigan	Michigan Stadium; Ann Arbor, MI	L 0–28	102,415	
November 15	Iowa	Ross–Ade Stadium; West Lafayette, IN	W 19–18	45,549	
November 22	at Indiana	Memorial Stadium; Bloomington, IN (Old Oaken Bucket)	W 9–7	43,455	
*Non-conference game; ^{†}Homecoming; Rankings from AP Poll released prior to the game

== Game summaries ==
=== USC ===
- Paul Beery 6 receptions, 101 yards

=== Wisconsin ===
- Mike Pruitt 31 carries, 162 yards
- Scott Dierking 20 carries, 139 yards

=== Illinois ===
- Mike Pruitt 29 carries, 115 yards

=== Ohio State ===
- Mike Pruitt 24 carries, 127 yards

=== Michigan State ===
- Scott Dierking 24 carries, 149 yards
- Mike Pruitt 28 carries, 120 yards

=== Iowa ===
Team	1	2	3	4	Total
Iowa	0	15	0	3	18
• Purdue	7	0	0	12	19

- Date: November 15
- Location: Ross–Ade Stadium
- Game attendance: 45,549

Scoring summary
Q1		PUR	Dierking 1 yard run (Schmidt kick)	PUR 7–0
Q2		IOWA	Schick 6 yard run (Schick run)	IOWA 8–7
Q2		IOWA	Fetter 19 yard run (Quartaro kick)	IOWA 15–7
Q4		IOWA	Quartaro 25 yard field goal	IOWA 18–7
Q4		PUR	Dierking 4 yard run (run failed)	IOWA 18–13
Q4	:05	PUR	Dierking 1 yard run (pass failed)	PUR 19–18

- Scott Dierking 30 carries, 107 yards

== Personnel ==
=== Roster ===
1975 Purdue Boilermakers football team roster
Players
Coaches
Offense

Pos.	#	Name	Class
WR		Reggie Arnold
WR		Paul Beery
RB		Tim Boykin
RB		Mike Brown
RB	25	Scott Dierking (C)	Jr
TE	88	Tim Eubank	So
G	55	Tom Gibson	Jr
OT	63	Dave LaFary	Jr
RB	22	Bennie Leverett	Fr
TE		Ron Likar
G	77	Ken Long	Sr
QB		Craig Nagel
WR		Jappy Oliver
OL		Jim Polak
FB	38	Mike Pruitt	Sr
FB	31	John Skibinski	So
OL		Jeff Stapleton
WR	42	Jesse Townsend	So
C	65	Jay Venzin	Jr
QB	18	Mark Vitali	Jr
C	51	Rich Wetendorf	Jr
TE	80	Nigel Wirgowski	Jr
G	50	Connie Zelencik	Jr

Defense

Pos.	#	Name	Class
LB	48	Fred Arrington
LB		Mike Burgamy
DL		Kim Cripe
DL		Mark Gorgal
DB		Pat Harris
DB		Jerome King
DT	71	Jim LeFeber	So
LB		Bob Mannella
DB		Mike Northington
DT	74	Ken Novak	Sr
DB		John Riester
DL		Roger Ruwe
DE	91	Blane Smith	Jr
LB		Joe Sullivan
DB		Mark Travline
DL		Jon Zwitt

Special teams

Pos.	#	Name	Class
P		Manuel Gentry

Head coach

- Alex Agase

Coordinators/assistant coaches

- George Catavolos
- Tom Roggeman
- Rick Venturi
- Stan Parrish (GA)

Legend

- (C) Team captain
- (S) Suspended
- (I) Ineligible
- Injured
- Redshirt

=== Coaching staff ===
HC: Alex Agase

Ast: George Catavolos, Fred Conti, Jack Ellis, Bob Geiger, Jerry Hartman, Pat Naughton, Tom Roggeman, Rick Venturi, Mike Wynn

=== Starters ===
Offense: se Arnold, ot Stapleton, og Gibson, c Polak, sg Zelencik, st Long, te Wirgowski, qb Vitali, fl Beery, fb Pruitt, tb Dierking, k Schmidt

Defense: le Smith, lt Novak, mg Gorgal/Ruwe, rt Parker, re Hardy, lb Sullivan, lb Mannella, cb DiMarzio/Harris, cb Cooper, s Wood/Lewis, s Andres/Thompson, p Vitali
