= 1975 Northwestern Wildcats football team =

American college football season

1975 Northwestern Wildcats football
- Conference: Big Ten Conference
- Record: 3–8 (2–6 Big Ten)
- Head coach: John Pont (3rd season)
- Captain: Greg Boykin
- Home stadium: Dyche Stadium

1975 Big Ten Conference football standings
	Conf.					Overall
Team	W		L		T	W		L		T
No. 4 Ohio State $	8	–	0	–	0	11	–	1	–	0
No. 8 Michigan	7	–	1	–	0	8	–	2	–	2
Michigan State	4	–	4	–	0	7	–	4	–	0
Illinois	4	–	4	–	0	5	–	6	–	0
Purdue	4	–	4	–	0	4	–	7	–	0
Wisconsin	3	–	4	–	1	4	–	6	–	1
Minnesota	3	–	5	–	0	6	–	5	–	0
Iowa	3	–	5	–	0	3	–	8	–	0
Northwestern	2	–	6	–	0	3	–	8	–	0
Indiana	1	–	6	–	1	2	–	8	–	1
$ – Conference champion; Rankings from AP Poll

The 1975 Northwestern Wildcats team represented Northwestern University during the 1975 Big Ten Conference football season. In their third year under head coach John Pont, the Wildcats compiled a 3–8 record (2–6 against Big Ten Conference opponents) and finished in ninth place in the Big Ten Conference.

The team's offensive leaders were quarterback Randy Dean with 1,315 passing yards, Greg Boykin with 1,105 rushing yards, and Scott Yelvington with 686 receiving yards. Three Northwestern players received All-Big Ten honors: (1) defensive back Pete Shaw (AP-1; UPI-1); (2) center Paul Jasinskis (AP-1; UPI-2); and (3) wide receiver Scott Yelvington (UPI-2).

== Schedule ==
Date	Opponent	Site	Result	Attendance	Source
September 13	Purdue	Dyche Stadium; Evanston, IL	W 31–25	22,000	
September 20	Northern Illinois*	Dyche Stadium; Evanston, IL	W 10–3	21,700	
September 27	at No. 7 Notre Dame*	Notre Dame Stadium; Notre Dame, IN (rivalry)	L 7–31	59,075	
October 4	at No. 17 Arizona*	Arizona Stadium; Tucson, AZ	L 6–41	38,501	
October 11	Indiana	Dyche Stadium; Evanston, IL	W 30–0	27,800	
October 18	at No. 7 Michigan	Michigan Stadium; Ann Arbor, MI (rivalry)	L 0–69	86,201	
October 25	at Wisconsin	Camp Randall Stadium; Madison, WI	L 14–17	78,902	
November 1	Iowa	Dyche Stadium; Evanston, IL	L 21–24	25,530	
November 8	at Minnesota	Memorial Stadium; Minneapolis, MN	L 9–33	24,998	
November 15	at Michigan State	Spartan Stadium; East Lansing, MI	L 14–47	54,432	
November 22	Illinois	Dyche Stadium; Evanston, IL (rivalry)	L 7–28	19,800	
*Non-conference game; Rankings from AP Poll released prior to the game

== Roster ==
1975 Northwestern Wildcats football team roster
Players
Coaches
Offense

Pos.	#	Name	Class
OT	68	Tony Ardizzone	So
RB	32	Greg Boykin (C)	Jr
QB	3	Randy Dean	Jr

Defense

Pos.	#	Name	Class
SS	22	Pete Shaw	Jr
DB		Robert Dean	Jr

Special teams

Pos.	#	Name	Class

Head coach

- John Pont

Coordinators/assistant coaches

Legend

- (C) Team captain
- (S) Suspended
- (I) Ineligible
- Injured
- Redshirt
