= 1975 Iowa Hawkeyes football team =

American college football season

1975 Iowa Hawkeyes football
- Conference: Big Ten Conference
- Record: 3–8 (3–5 Big Ten)
- Head coach: Bob Commings (2nd season)
- Defensive coordinator: Larry Coyer (2nd season)
- MVP: Andre Jackson
- Captains: Andre Jackson; Brandt Yocom
- Home stadium: Kinnick Stadium

1975 Big Ten Conference football standings
	Conf.					Overall
Team	W		L		T	W		L		T
No. 4 Ohio State $	8	–	0	–	0	11	–	1	–	0
No. 8 Michigan	7	–	1	–	0	8	–	2	–	2
Michigan State	4	–	4	–	0	7	–	4	–	0
Illinois	4	–	4	–	0	5	–	6	–	0
Purdue	4	–	4	–	0	4	–	7	–	0
Wisconsin	3	–	4	–	1	4	–	6	–	1
Minnesota	3	–	5	–	0	6	–	5	–	0
Iowa	3	–	5	–	0	3	–	8	–	0
Northwestern	2	–	6	–	0	3	–	8	–	0
Indiana	1	–	6	–	1	2	–	8	–	1
$ – Conference champion; Rankings from AP Poll

The 1975 Iowa Hawkeyes football team was an American football team that represented the University of Iowa as a member of the Big Ten Conference during the 1975 Big Ten football season. In their second year under head coach Bob Commings, the Hawkeyes compiled a 3–8 record (3–5 in conference games), tied for seventh place in the Big Ten, and were outscored by a total of 279 to 182.

The 1975 Hawkeyes gained 2,406 rushing yards and 597 passing yards. On defense, they gave up 2,458 rushing yards and 1,282 passing yards.

The team's statistical leaders included quarterback Tom McLaughlin (23-of-87 passing for 358 yards), running back Dave Schick (482 rushing yards), Bill Schultz (eight receptions for 238 yards), kicker Nick Quartaro (40 points scored), and Andre Jackson (126 total tackles). Tackle Rod Walters and guard Joe Devlin received first-team All-America honors from Time magazine and The Sporting News and, in Walters' case, the Newspaper Enterprise Association. Defensive back Bob Elliott was a first-team Academic All-American. Linebacker Andre Jackson and tight end Brandt Yocom were the team captains. Jackson was also selected as the team's most valuable player.

The team played its home games at Kinnick Stadium in Iowa City, Iowa. Home attendance totaled 320,690, an average of 53,448 per game.

== Schedule ==
Date	Opponent	Site	Result	Attendance	Source
September 13	Illinois	Kinnick Stadium; Iowa City, IA	L 12–27	57,200	
September 20	at Syracuse*	Archbold Stadium; Syracuse, NY	L 7–10	19,283	
September 27	No. 12 Penn State*	Kinnick Stadium; Iowa City, IA	L 10–30	52,780	
October 4	No. 3 USC*	Kinnick Stadium; Iowa City, IA	L 16–27	54,600	
October 11	at No. 1 Ohio State	Ohio Stadium; Columbus, OH	L 0–49	87,826	
October 18	at Indiana	Memorial Stadium; Bloomington, IN	W 20–10	32,441	
October 25	Minnesota^{†}	Kinnick Stadium; Iowa City, IA (rivalry)	L 7–31	59,160	
November 1	at Northwestern	Dyche Stadium; Evanston, IL	W 24–21	25,530	
November 8	Wisconsin	Kinnick Stadium; Iowa City, IA	W 45–28	54,650	
November 15	at Purdue	Ross–Ade Stadium; West Lafayette, IN	L 18–19	45,549	
November 22	Michigan State	Kinnick Stadium; Iowa City, IA	L 23–27	42,300	
*Non-conference game; ^{†}Homecoming; Rankings from AP Poll released prior to the game

== Roster ==
1975 Iowa Hawkeyes football team roster
Players
Coaches
Offense

Pos.	#	Name	Class
OL	72	Joe Devlin	Sr
OL	76	Rod Walters	Sr
FB	48	Mark Fetter	Sr
RB		Tom Grine	Jr
FB		Bob Holmes	Sr
RB	22	Jim Jensen	Sr
QB	17	Butch Caldwell	Jr
QB		Tom McLaughlin	So
		Rod Wellington	Sr

Defense

Pos.	#	Name	Class
LB	20	Andre Jackson	Sr
DB	21	Jim Caldwell	Jr

Special teams

Pos.	#	Name	Class
K		Nick Quartaro	Jr

Head coach

- Bob Commings

Coordinators/assistant coaches

- Dennis Green – Running backs

Legend

- (C) Team captain
- (S) Suspended
- (I) Ineligible
- Injured
- Redshirt

== 1976 NFL draft ==
Player	Position	Round	Pick	NFL club
Wayne Walters	Guard	1	14	Kansas City Chiefs
Jim Jensen	Running back	2	40	Dallas Cowboys
Joe Devlin	Offensive tackle	2	52	Buffalo Bills
Rod Wellington	Running back	7	196	Kansas City Chiefs
Warren Peiffer	Defensive tackle	9	240	New Orleans Saints
