= Leonard Willis =

American football player (born 1953)

No. 80, 86, 89
- Positions: Wide receiver, kick returner

Personal information
- Born: March 4, 1953 (age 73); Washington, D.C., U.S.
- Listed height: 5 ft 11 in (1.80 m)
- Listed weight: 183 lb (83 kg)

Career information
- High school: Roosevelt (Washington, D.C.)
- College: Ohio State
- NFL draft: 1976: 4th round, 118th overall pick

Career history
- Minnesota Vikings (1976); New Orleans Saints (1977); Buffalo Bills (1977–1979); Chicago Blitz (1983)

Career NFL statistics
- Receptions: 2
- Receiving yards: 41
- Return yards: 999
- Stats at Pro Football Reference

Leonard Leroy Willis (born March 4, 1953) is an American former professional football player who was a wide receiver in the National Football League (NFL). He played college football for the Ohio State Buckeyes and was selected by the Minnesota Vikings in the fourth round of the 1976 NFL draft. He played in the NFL for the Minnesota Vikings, New Orleans Saints and Buffalo Bills from 1976 to 1979.

== College career ==
Willis played at Ohio State University for the Buckeyes in 1974 and 1975 after transferring from junior college. His teammates with the Buckeyes included 2-time Heisman Trophy winner Archie Griffin, fellow wide receiver Brian Baschnagel, fullback Pete Johnson and safety Tim Fox, and his quarterback was Cornelius Greene. In 1974, he was clocked as the fastest Buckeye football player ever until that time, running the 100-yard dash in 9.3 seconds. Besides playing as a receiver he also returned kicks and even played some free safety for the Buckeyes. In 1974, he did not catch a pass, but ran 11 times for 146 yards, a 13.3 yards per rush average. In 1975, he caught 17 passes for 350 yards, a 20.6 yards per catch average, with 2 touchdowns. His receiving yards and touchdowns were each good enough to rank 8th in the Big Ten Conference. The Buckeyes won the Big Ten Conference championship in both his years with the team, but lost in the Rose Bowl each season.

== Professional career ==
Willis was drafted by the Minnesota Vikings with the 118th overall pick in the fourth round of the 1976 NFL draft. Willis played in all 14 regular season games for the Vikings in 1976, primarily as a kick returner. He returned 24 kickoffs for 552 yards, a 23.0 yard average. He also returned 30 punts for 207 yards, a 6.9 yard average. He also played in all 3 playoff games for the Vikings, as the Vikings won the NFC Championship, primarily returning punts and kickoffs. In Super Bowl XI against the Oakland Raiders Willis returned 3 kickoffs for 57 yards (a 19.0 yard average) and 3 punts for 14 yards (a 4.7 yard average).

In 1977 Willis played for both the New Orleans Saints and the Buffalo Bills, again primarily as a kick returner. In 1978, playing for Buffalo, he only played in 4 games and returned just 1 kickoff. But he also had his only 2 professional receptions that year, gaining 41 yards for a 20.5 yard average on those receptions. He finished his career with Buffalo in 1979, playing 7 games and returning 4 kickoffs for 92 yards that season.
