= 1975 Indiana Hoosiers football team =

American college football season

1975 Indiana Hoosiers football
- Conference: Big Ten Conference
- Record: 2–8–1 (1–6–1 Big Ten)
- Head coach: Lee Corso (3rd season)
- MVP: Donnie Thomas
- Captains: Jim Shuck; Donnie Thomas
- Home stadium: Memorial Stadium

1975 Big Ten Conference football standings
| | Conf. | | | | | Overall |
| Team | W | | L | | T | W | | L | | T |
|---|---|---|---|---|---|---|---|---|---|---|
| No. 4 Ohio State $ | 8 | – | 0 | – | 0 | 11 | – | 1 | – | 0 |
| No. 8 Michigan | 7 | – | 1 | – | 0 | 8 | – | 2 | – | 2 |
| Michigan State | 4 | – | 4 | – | 0 | 7 | – | 4 | – | 0 |
| Illinois | 4 | – | 4 | – | 0 | 5 | – | 6 | – | 0 |
| Purdue | 4 | – | 4 | – | 0 | 4 | – | 7 | – | 0 |
| Wisconsin | 3 | – | 4 | – | 1 | 4 | – | 6 | – | 1 |
| Minnesota | 3 | – | 5 | – | 0 | 6 | – | 5 | – | 0 |
| Iowa | 3 | – | 5 | – | 0 | 3 | – | 8 | – | 0 |
| Northwestern | 2 | – | 6 | – | 0 | 3 | – | 8 | – | 0 |
| Indiana | 1 | – | 6 | – | 1 | 2 | – | 8 | – | 1 |
$ – Conference champion; Rankings from AP Poll

The 1975 Indiana Hoosiers football team represented Indiana University in the 1975 Big Ten Conference football season. They participated as members of the Big Ten Conference. The Hoosiers played their home games at Memorial Stadium in Bloomington, Indiana. The team was coached by Lee Corso, in his third year as head coach of the Hoosiers. The Hoosiers offense only scored 104 points while the defense allowed 254 points. Indiana Hoosiers men's basketball player and College Basketball Hall of Fame member Quinn Buckner was drafted by the Washington Redskins though he did not play football his junior or senior year.

== Schedule ==
| Date | Opponent | Site | Result | Attendance | Source |
|---|---|---|---|---|---|
| September 13 | Minnesota | Memorial Stadium; Bloomington, IN | W 20–14 | 35,953 | |
| September 20 | at No. 6 Nebraska* | Memorial Stadium; Lincoln, NE | L 0–45 | 76,022 | |
| September 27 | Utah* | Memorial Stadium; Bloomington, IN | W 31–7 | 32,864 | |
| October 4 | at NC State* | Carter Stadium; Raleigh, NC | L 0–27 | 39,700 | |
| October 11 | at Northwestern | Dyche Stadium; Evanston, IL | L 0–30 | 27,800 | |
| October 18 | Iowa^{†} | Memorial Stadium; Bloomington, IN | L 10–20 | 32,441 | |
| October 25 | at No. 7 Michigan | Michigan Stadium; Ann Arbor, MI | L 7–55 | 93,857 | |
| November 1 | at No. 1 Ohio State | Ohio Stadium; Columbus, OH | L 14–24 | 87,835 | |
| November 8 | Michigan State | Memorial Stadium; Bloomington, IN (rivalry) | L 6–14 | 31,930 | |
| November 15 | at Wisconsin | Camp Randall Stadium; Madison, WI | T 9–9 | 65,317 | |
| November 22 | Purdue | Memorial Stadium; Bloomington, IN (Old Oaken Bucket) | L 7–9 | 43,455 | |
*Non-conference game; ^{†}Homecoming; Rankings from AP Poll released prior to the game

== 1976 NFL draftees ==
| Player | Position | Round | Pick | NFL club |
| Greg McGuire | Defensive tackle | 6 | 181 | Dallas Cowboys |
| John Jordan | Defensive tackle | 8 | 221 | New York Giants |
| Donnie Thomas | Linebacker | 11 | 298 | New England Patriots |
| Quinn Buckner | Defensive back | 14 | 393 | Washington Redskins |
| Trent Smock | Wide receiver | 15 | 419 | Detroit Lions |

Defensive back Quinn Buckner went on to a career in the National Basketball Association (NBA).
