= 1975 Minnesota Golden Gophers football team =

American college football season

1975 Minnesota Golden Gophers football
- Conference: Big Ten Conference
- Record: 6–5 (3–5 Big Ten)
- Head coach: Cal Stoll (4th season)
- MVP: Tony Dungy
- Captain: Keith Simons
- Home stadium: Memorial Stadium

1975 Big Ten Conference football standings
	Conf.					Overall
Team	W		L		T	W		L		T
No. 4 Ohio State $	8	–	0	–	0	11	–	1	–	0
No. 8 Michigan	7	–	1	–	0	8	–	2	–	2
Michigan State	4	–	4	–	0	7	–	4	–	0
Illinois	4	–	4	–	0	5	–	6	–	0
Purdue	4	–	4	–	0	4	–	7	–	0
Wisconsin	3	–	4	–	1	4	–	6	–	1
Minnesota	3	–	5	–	0	6	–	5	–	0
Iowa	3	–	5	–	0	3	–	8	–	0
Northwestern	2	–	6	–	0	3	–	8	–	0
Indiana	1	–	6	–	1	2	–	8	–	1
$ – Conference champion; Rankings from AP Poll

The 1975 Minnesota Golden Gophers football team represented the University of Minnesota in the 1975 Big Ten Conference football season. In their fourth year under head coach Cal Stoll, the Golden Gophers compiled a 6–5 record and were outscored by their opponents by a combined total of 236 to 192.

Quarterback Tony Dungy received the team's Most Valuable Player award. Dungy and safety Doug Beaudoin were named All-Big Ten second team. Dungy was also named Academic All-Big Ten.

Total attendance for the season was 220,081, which averaged to 31,440. The season high for attendance was against Michigan State.

== Schedule ==
Date	Opponent	Site	Result	Attendance	Source
September 13	at Indiana	Memorial Stadium; Bloomington, IN	L 14–20	35,953	
September 20	Western Michigan*	Memorial Stadium; Minneapolis, MN	W 38–0	23,326	
September 27	Oregon*	Memorial Stadium; Minneapolis, MN	W 10–7	34,300	
October 4	Ohio*	Memorial Stadium; Minneapolis, MN	W 21–0	27,486	
October 11	at Illinois	Memorial Stadium; Champaign, IL	L 23–42	46,162	
October 18	No. 17 Michigan State^{†}	Memorial Stadium; Minneapolis, MN	L 15–38	39,202	
October 25	at Iowa	Kinnick Stadium; Iowa City, IA (rivalry)	W 31–7	59,160	
November 1	No. 7 Michigan	Memorial Stadium; Minneapolis, MN (Little Brown Jug)	L 21–28	33,191	
November 8	Northwestern	Memorial Stadium; Minneapolis, MN	W 33–9	24,998	
November 15	at No. 1 Ohio State	Ohio Stadium; Columbus, OH	L 6–38	87,817	
November 22	Wisconsin	Memorial Stadium; Minneapolis, MN (rivalry)	W 24–3	37,578	
*Non-conference game; ^{†}Homecoming; Rankings from AP Poll released prior to the game

== Game summaries ==
=== Iowa ===
Team	1	2	3	4	Total
• Minnesota	7	7	7	10	31
Iowa	7	0	0	0	7

- Date: October 25
- Location: Kinnick Stadium, Iowa City, IA
- Game attendance: 59,160

Scoring summary
1	IOWA	Holmes 13-yard run (Quartaro kick)	IOWA 7-0
1	MINN	Kullas 7-yard pass from Dungy (Kocourek kick)	Tied 7-7
2	MINN	Anhorn 13-yard pass from Dungy (Kocourek kick)	MINN 14-7
3	MINN	Perkins 1-yard run (Kocourek kick)	MINN 21-7
4	MINN	Perkins 1-yard run (Kocourek kick)	MINN 28-7
4	MINN	Kocourek 31-yard field goal	MINN 31-7

== Roster ==
1975 Minnesota Golden Gophers football team roster
Players			Coaches
Offense: Pos. / # / Name / Class; QB / / Tony Dungy	Defense: Pos. / # / Name / Class; DB / 22 / Doug Beaudoin / Sr	Special teams: Pos. / # / Name / Class	Head coach: Cal Stoll; Coordinators/assistant coaches Legend: (C) Team captain; (S) Suspended; (I) Ineligible; Injured; Redshirt
