= 1975 Illinois Fighting Illini football team =

American college football season

1975 Illinois Fighting Illini football
- Conference: Big Ten Conference
- Record: 5–6 (4–4 Big Ten)
- Head coach: Bob Blackman (5th season)
- MVPs: Stu Levenick; Bruce Beaman
- Captains: Dean March; Stu Levenick
- Home stadium: Memorial Stadium

1975 Big Ten Conference football standings
	Conf.					Overall
Team	W		L		T	W		L		T
No. 4 Ohio State $	8	–	0	–	0	11	–	1	–	0
No. 8 Michigan	7	–	1	–	0	8	–	2	–	2
Michigan State	4	–	4	–	0	7	–	4	–	0
Illinois	4	–	4	–	0	5	–	6	–	0
Purdue	4	–	4	–	0	4	–	7	–	0
Wisconsin	3	–	4	–	1	4	–	6	–	1
Minnesota	3	–	5	–	0	6	–	5	–	0
Iowa	3	–	5	–	0	3	–	8	–	0
Northwestern	2	–	6	–	0	3	–	8	–	0
Indiana	1	–	6	–	1	2	–	8	–	1
$ – Conference champion; Rankings from AP Poll

The 1975 Illinois Fighting Illini football team was an American football team that represented the University of Illinois as a member of the Big Ten Conference during the 1975 Big Ten season. In their fifth year under head coach Bob Blackman, the Illini compiled a 5–6 record (4–4 in conference games), finished in a three-way tie for third place in the Big Ten, and were outscored by a total of 260 to 229.

The team's statistical leaders included quarterback Kurt Steger (1,136 passing yards, 48.2% completion percentage), running back Lonnie Perrin (907 rushing yards, 5.3 yards per carry, seven touchdowns), and wide receiver Jeff Chrystal (22 receptions, 261 yards). Offensive tackle Stu Levenick and defensive back Bruce Beaman were selected as the team's most valuable players.

The team played its home games at Memorial Stadium in Champaign, Illinois.

== Schedule ==
Date	Opponent	Site	Result	Attendance	Source
September 13	at Iowa	Kinnick Stadium; Iowa City, IA	W 27–12	57,200	
September 20	No. 5 Missouri*	Memorial Stadium; Champaign, IL (rivalry)	L 20–30	57,059	
September 27	at No. 8 Texas A&M*	Kyle Field; College Station, TX	L 13–43	45,524	
October 4	Washington State*	Memorial Stadium; Champaign, IL	W 27–21	51,060	
October 11	Minnesota	Memorial Stadium; Champaign, IL	W 42–23	46,162	
October 18	Purdue	Memorial Stadium; Champaign, IL (rivalry)	L 24–26	61,204	
October 25	at No. 16 Michigan State	Spartan Stadium; East Lansing, MI	W 21–19	66,223	
November 1	at Wisconsin	Camp Randall Stadium; Madison, WI	L 9–18	78,868	
November 8	No. 1 Ohio State	Memorial Stadium; Champaign, IL (Illibuck)	L 3–40	67,571	
November 15	No. 4 Michigan	Memorial Stadium; Champaign, IL (rivalry)	L 15–21	45,077	
November 22	at Northwestern	Dyche Stadium; Evanston, IL (rivalry)	W 28–7	19,800	
*Non-conference game; Rankings from AP Poll released prior to the game

== Roster ==
1975 Illinois Fighting Illini football team roster
Players
Coaches
Offense

Pos.	#	Name	Class
OT	76	Burt Owens	So
OT	74	Kevin Pancratz	Jr
SE	40	John Peach	Jr
TB	33	Lonnie Perrin	Sr
TB	23	Jim Phillips	Jr
QB	16	Ray Pokorny	Jr
TB	14	Dirk Schnittker	So

Defense

Pos.	#	Name	Class
S	15	Jeff Stewart	Jr
LB	67	Scott Studwell	Sr
LB	97	John Sullivan	So
LB	51	Chris Williams	Jr
LB	37	Rick Williams	Sr
DB	21	John Yanoshik	Jr

Special teams

Pos.	#	Name	Class

Head coach

- Bob Blackman

Coordinators/assistant coaches

Legend

- (C) Team captain
- (S) Suspended
- (I) Ineligible
- Injured
- Redshirt

Roster
