= Donnie Thomas (American football) =

American football player (1953–2017)

No. 51
- Position: Linebacker

Personal information
- Born: March 12, 1953; Michigan City, Indiana, U.S.
- Died: May 11, 2017 (aged 64); Michigan City, Indiana, U.S.
- Listed height: 6 ft 2 in (1.88 m)
- Listed weight: 245 lb (111 kg)

Career information
- High school: Michigan City (IN) Elston
- College: Indiana
- NFL draft: 1976: 11th round, 298th overall pick

Career history
- New England Patriots (1976); Hamilton Tiger-Cats (1977)

Awards and highlights
- Third-team All-American (1975); First-team All-Big Ten (1975); Second-team All-Big Ten (1974)
- Stats at Pro Football Reference

Donnie Thomas (March 12, 1953 – May 11, 2017) was an American football linebacker. He played for the New England Patriots in 1976 and for the Hamilton Tiger-Cats in 1977.

He died on May 11, 2017, in Michigan City, Indiana at age 64.
