= Mike Pruitt =

American football player (born 1954)

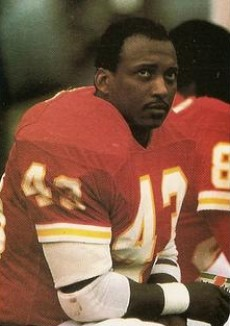
- Pruitt with the Kansas City Chiefs in 1986

No. 43, 33
- Position: Fullback

Personal information
- Born: April 3, 1954 (age 72); Chicago, Illinois, U.S.
- Listed height: 6 ft 0 in (1.83 m)
- Listed weight: 222 lb (101 kg)

Career information
- High school: Wendell Phillips Academy (Chicago, Illinois)
- College: Purdue
- NFL draft: 1976: 1st round, 7th overall pick

Career history
- Cleveland Browns (1976–1984); Buffalo Bills (1985); Kansas City Chiefs (1985–1986)

Awards and highlights
- 2× Pro Bowl (1979, 1980); Cleveland Browns Legends; Second-team All-Big Ten (1975)

Career NFL statistics
- Rushing yards: 7,378
- All-purpose yards: 9,475
- Touchdowns: 56
- Stats at Pro Football Reference

Michael L. Pruitt (born April 3, 1954) is an American former professional football player who was a fullback for 11 seasons in the National Football League (NFL) from 1976 to 1986. He was selected by the Cleveland Browns in the first round (seventh overall pick) of the 1976 NFL draft and spent nine seasons with that club. He had five seasons with over 1,000 rushing yards and was selected to play in the Pro Bowl in 1979 and 1980. He also played for the Buffalo Bills for four games in 1985 and for the Kansas City Chiefs in 1985 and 1986. In his NFL career, Pruitt appeared in a total of 152 games, gained 7,378 rushing yards and scored 56 touchdowns.

A native of Chicago, Pruitt also played college football at the fullback position for the Purdue Boilermakers from 1973 to 1975 and was selected as a second-team running back on the 1975 All-Big Ten Conference football team.

== Early life ==
Pruitt was born in Chicago in 1954. He attended Wendell Phillips Academy High School in the Bronzeville District of Chicago.

== Purdue University ==
Pruitt enrolled at Purdue University and played college football as a fullback for the Purdue Boilermakers football teams from 1973 to 1975. He was known for his combination of speed and strength, having been clocked at 4.4 seconds over 40 yards and bench pressing 425 pounds.

Pruitt gained 613 rushing yards on 102 carries in 1974, ranking fifth in the Big Ten Conference with an average of 6.0 yards per carry. He also set a Purdue school record on November 2, 1974, with a 94-yard touchdown run against Iowa.

As a senior in 1975, Pruitt gained 899 rushing yards on 217 carries (4.1 yards per carry). Despite not finishing among the top ten in rushing yardage in the conference, he was selected by the conference coaches as a second-team player on the 1975 All-Big Ten Conference football team, placing behind Heisman Trophy winner Archie Griffin and Gordon Bell.

== Professional football ==
=== 1976–1978 ===
Pruitt was selected by the Cleveland Browns in the first round (seventh overall pick) of the 1976 NFL draft. He remained with the Browns from 1976 to 1984.

In his first two seasons with the Browns, Pruitt saw limited playing time as a backup to Greg Pruitt (no family relationship). In 1978, Pruitt became a starter mid-season. He started nine games at fullback and rushed for 560 yards and five touchdowns.

=== Peak years: 1979–1983 ===
Following a knee injury to Greg Pruitt, Pruitt had his breakout season in 1979 when he started all 16 games at fullback and had career highs with 1,294 rushing yards, 4.9 rushing yards per carry, and 1,666 yards from scrimmage. He ranked fifth in the NFL that year in all three categories. At the end of the 1979 season, he was named a first-team all-conference player and was selected to play in the 1979 Pro Bowl. After the 1979 season, Pruitt described his first two years in the NFL as the toughest in his life, but noted that "all that has changed now and I don't look back or worry about that now."

In 1980, Pruitt again started all 16 games at fullback for the Browns. He gained 1,034 rushing yards and 1,505 yards from scrimmage and was selected for the second consecutive year to play in the Pro Bowl. Pruitt helped lead the 1980 Cleveland Browns to an 11–5 record and a first-place finish in the AFC Central Division. He started the Browns' one and only playoff game in 1980 and rushed for 48 yards on 13 carries.

In 1981, Pruitt started 15 games at fullback and gained 1,103 rushing yards and 1,545 yards from scrimmage. However, and after making the playoffs in 1980, the Browns dropped to 5–11 in 1981.

During the strike-shortened 1982 NFL season, Pruitt gained only 516 rushing yards on 143 carries, an average of only 3.6 yards per carry. Browns coach Sam Rutigliano said that, when Pruitt returned after a 57-day layoff resulting from the strike, he was "a shell of the guy" he had been and was not ready to play, "either mentally or physically."

In 1983, Pruitt compiled his fourth and final 1,000 yard rushing season. He started 14 games at running back for the Browns and gained 1,184 rushing yards and 1,341 yards from scrimmage.

During his peak years from 1979 to 1983, Pruitt gained 6,713 yards from scrimmage in 72 games, an average of 93.2 yards per game.

=== 1984–1986 ===
In 1984, Boyce Green took over as the Browns' lead running back. Pruitt's playing time declined, as he appeared in 10 games, but only seven as a starter. He rushed for 506 yards and six touchdowns on 163 carries. The Browns released Pruitt in early September 1985, as part of the final round of cuts before the start of the regular season. At the time of his release, Pruitt said he was "surprised, but not bitter."

Two weeks after being cut by the Browns, Pruitt signed with the Buffalo Bills. He appeared in four games, two as a starter, for the 1985 Bills team. He carried the ball seven times for the Bills, totaling 24 yards from scrimmage. Pruitt joined the Kansas City Chiefs in the middle of the 1985 season. He started eight games for the Chiefs in 1985 and gained 366 rushing yards with two touchdowns. The following year, Pruitt started 15 games at fullback for the 1986 Kansas City team. He gained 448 yards and scored two touchdowns in his final NFL season.

=== Career statistics ===
Pruitt played in 152 games during his career, rushing for 7,378 yards and 51 touchdowns on 1,844 carries (4.0 yards per carry). He also caught 270 passes for 1,860 yards and five touchdowns. He ranks third in Browns' franchise history in career rushing yardage trailing only Jim Brown and Leroy Kelly.

== NFL career statistics ==
Legend
**Bold**	Career high

Year	Team	Games		Rushing						Receiving					Fumbles	
Year	Team	GP	GS	Att	Yds	Avg	Y/G	Lng	TD	Rec	Yds	Avg	Lng	TD	Fum	FR
1976	CLE	13	2	52	138	2.7	10.6	18	0	8	26	3.3	15	0	4	0
1977	CLE	13	0	47	205	4.4	15.8	21	1	3	12	4.0	6	0	1	0
1978	CLE	**16**	9	135	560	4.1	35.0	71	5	20	112	5.6	15	0	3	2
1979	CLE	**16**	**16**	264	**1,294**	**4.9**	**80.9**	**77**	9	41	372	**9.1**	**50**	**2**	6	0
1980	CLE	**16**	**16**	249	1,034	4.2	64.6	56	6	**63**	**471**	7.5	28	0	**9**	**3**
1981	CLE	**16**	**16**	247	1,103	4.5	68.9	21	7	**63**	442	7.0	21	1	5	2
1982	CLE	9	9	143	516	3.6	57.3	17	3	22	140	6.4	13	0	4	2
1983	CLE	15	14	**293**	1,184	4.0	78.9	27	**10**	30	157	5.2	21	**2**	4	2
1984	CLE	10	7	163	506	3.1	50.6	14	6	5	29	5.8	9	0	1	1
1985	BUF	4	2	7	24	3.4	6.0	7	0	0	0	0.0	0	0	–	–
1985	KC	9	8	105	366	3.5	40.7	54	2	7	43	6.1	9	0	–	–
1986	KC	15	15	139	448	3.2	29.9	16	2	8	56	7.0	13	0	–	–
Career		152	114	1,844	7,378	4.0	48.5	77	51	270	1,860	6.9	50	5	37	12

== Later life ==
After retiring from football, Pruitt owned a Ford dealership in Lima, Ohio, and a Honda dealership in Akron, Ohio. He sold his Ford dealership in approximately 2006, then his Honda dealership in 2014. As of 2003, he lived in Strongsville, Ohio.

Pruitt was inducted into the Greater Cleveland Sports Hall of Fame in 2003. In 2013, he was named by The Plain Dealer as the 38th best player in Browns' history. Currently, he serves as a Jehovah's Witness in Cleveland.
