= Greg Schaum =

American football player (1954–2021)

No. 78, 76
- Position: Defensive end

Personal information
- Born: January 1, 1954; Baltimore, Maryland, U.S.
- Died: July 1, 2021 (aged 67); Perry Hall, Maryland, U.S.
- Listed height: 6 ft 4 in (1.93 m)
- Listed weight: 246 lb (112 kg)

Career information
- High school: Polytechnic (Baltimore)
- College: Michigan State
- NFL draft: 1976: 7th round, 186th overall pick

Career history
- Dallas Cowboys (1976–1977); New England Patriots (1978)

Awards and highlights
- Super Bowl champion (XII); 2× Second-team All-Big Ten (1974, 1975)

Career NFL statistics
- Games played: 26
- Stats at Pro Football Reference

Gregory James Schaum (January 1, 1954 – July 1, 2021) was an American professional football defensive end in the National Football League (NFL) for the Dallas Cowboys and New England Patriots. He played college football at Michigan State University.

== Early life ==
Schaum attended the Baltimore Polytechnic Institute, where he lettered in football, wrestling and lacrosse. In football, he was a two-way tackle and was named All-American as a senior.

He accepted a football scholarship from Michigan State University, where he was a three-year starter at right defensive tackle.

In 2007, he was inducted into the Maryland State Athletic Hall of Fame.

== Professional career ==
=== Dallas Cowboys ===
Schaum was selected by the Dallas Cowboys in the seventh round (186th overall) of the 1976 NFL draft. As a rookie, he was a backup defensive end, playing in 12 games. On September 7, 1977, he was placed on the injured reserve list with a knee injury. He was waived on August 28, 1978.

=== New England Patriots ===
On September 7, 1978, he was signed as a free agent by the New England Patriots, to provide depth after Greg Boyd and Julius Adams suffered injuries. He appeared in 14 games as a backup defensive end. He was released on August 20, 1979.
