= Craig Cassady =

American football player (born 1953)

No. 23
- Position: Defensive back

Personal information
- Born: December 21, 1953 (age 72); Columbus, Ohio, U.S.
- Listed height: 5 ft 11 in (1.80 m)
- Listed weight: 175 lb (79 kg)

Career information
- High school: Whetstone (Columbus)
- College: Ohio State
- NFL draft: 1976: 8th round, 213th overall pick

Career history
- New Orleans Saints (1977)

Awards and highlights
- Second-team All-Big Ten (1975)
- Stats at Pro Football Reference

Craig Cassady (born December 21, 1953) is an American former professional football player who was a defensive back for the New Orleans Saints of the National Football League (NFL) in 1977. He played college football for the Ohio State Buckeyes. His father was Howard "Hopalong" Cassady who won the Heisman Trophy while playing for Ohio State and played eight years in the NFL.
