= Steve Wagner (American football) =

American football player (born 1954)

No. 21, 42
- Position: Safety

Personal information
- Born: April 18, 1954 (age 72); Milwaukee, Wisconsin, U.S.
- Listed height: 6 ft 2 in (1.88 m)
- Listed weight: 208 lb (94 kg)

Career information
- High school: Oconomowoc (Oconomowoc, Wisconsin)
- College: Wisconsin
- NFL draft: 1976: 5th round, 133rd overall pick

Career history
- Minnesota Vikings (1976)*; Green Bay Packers (1976–1979); Philadelphia Eagles (1980–1982)
- * Offseason or practice squad member only

Awards and highlights
- Second-team All-Big Ten (1975)

Career NFL statistics
- Games played: 61
- Kick returns: 14
- Return yards: 181
- Stats at Pro Football Reference

Steven John Wagner (born April 18, 1954) is an American former professional football player who was a defensive back in the National Football League (NFL). He played four seasons for the Green Bay Packers (1976–1979) and one for the Philadelphia Eagles (1980). Wagner graduated from Oconomowoc High School before playing college football for the Wisconsin Badgers. He was a second-team All-Big Ten selection during his senior year at Wisconsin.

Wagner was selected in the fifth round of the 1976 NFL draft by the Minnesota Vikings. He missed out on a roster spot with the Vikings but ended up signing a contract with the Packers halfway through the 1976 NFL season. The Wisconsin State Journal noted that Wagner was a "key member of the Packer specialty teams" and recorded the most tackles (13 solo, 10 assisted) during punt and kick returns of any player on the Packers during the 1977 NFL season. Prior to the 1980 NFL season, Wagner was waived by the Packers and then signed by the Eagles. After playing for the Eagles during the preseason, he was waived again and returned home to work as a salesman for his father's electronics business. However, the Eagles ended up signing Wagner near the end of the season due to injuries to other players. Over a five year career with the Packers and Eagles, Wagner played in 61 games, recording 14 kick returns for 181 yards, while also recovering three fumbles. He never started a game in his NFL career.
