= Mike Cobb =

American football player (born 1955)

No. 89, 87
- Position: Tight end

Personal information
- Born: December 20, 1955 (age 70); Youngstown, Ohio, U.S.
- Listed height: 6 ft 5 in (1.96 m)
- Listed weight: 244 lb (111 kg)

Career information
- High school: Youngstown North
- College: Michigan State
- NFL draft: 1977: 1st round, 22nd overall pick

Career history
- Cincinnati Bengals (1977); Chicago Bears (1978–1981); Michigan Panthers (1983–1984)

Awards and highlights
- 2× First-team All-Big Ten (1975, 1976)

Career NFL statistics
- Games played: 62
- Receptions: 11
- Receiving yards: 134
- Touchdowns: 0
- Stats at Pro Football Reference

Michael Cobb (born December 20, 1955) is an American former professional football player who was a tight end in the National Football League (NFL).

Cobb played football for Michigan State University. He was selected in the first round (22nd overall) by the Cincinnati Bengals in the 1977 NFL draft. He played five seasons for the Bengals and the Chicago Bears. After playing one season with the Bengals, he was traded to the Bears for whom he played from 1978 through 1981. Cobb also played for the Michigan Panthers in the United States Football League (USFL) during the 1983 and 1984 seasons where he caught 118 passes for 1,319 yards with 10 touchdowns.

He is a cousin of Sherman Smith, a former running back and former running backs coach for the Seattle Seahawks.
