= Ken Long =

American football player (1953–2023)

No. 65
- Position: Guard

Personal information
- Born: July 24, 1953; Pittsburgh, Pennsylvania, U.S.
- Died: December 7, 2023 (aged 70)
- Listed height: 6 ft 3 in (1.91 m)
- Listed weight: 265 lb (120 kg)

Career information
- High school: Ravenna (OH)
- College: Purdue
- NFL draft: 1976: 2nd round, 44th overall pick

Career history
- Detroit Lions (1976–1977)

Awards and highlights
- Second-team All-American (1975); Second-team All-Big Ten (1975)

Career NFL statistics
- Games played: 13
- Games started: 0
- Stats at Pro Football Reference

Kenneth Donald Long (July 24, 1953 – December 7, 2023) was an American professional football player. He played guard for the Detroit Lions of the National Football League (NFL) after playing college football at Purdue University. He was drafted by the Lions with the 44th pick of the second round of the 1976 NFL draft. He did not sign a contract with the Lions until shortly before the 1976 preseason. He played 13 games for the Lions in 1976 and returned two kickoffs for 18 yards. He was placed on the injured reserve list before the 1977 season. Long died on December 7, 2023, at the age of 70.
