= Ken Novak =

American football player (born 1954)

- Novak in 1977

No. 74
- Position: Defensive tackle

Personal information
- Born: July 3, 1954 (age 72); Willowick, Ohio, U.S.
- Listed height: 6 ft 7 in (2.01 m)
- Listed weight: 268 lb (122 kg)

Career information
- High school: Villa Angela-St. Joseph
- College: Purdue
- NFL draft: 1976: 1st round, 20th overall pick

Career history
- Baltimore Colts (1976–1977); Cleveland Browns (1978)

Awards and highlights
- First-team All-American (1975); First-team All-Big Ten (1974); Second-team All-Big Ten (1975)

Career NFL statistics
- Games played: 23
- Starts: 2
- Sacks: 1
- Fumble recoveries: 2
- Stats at Pro Football Reference

Ken Novak (born July 3, 1954) is an American former professional football player who was a defensive tackle in the National Football League (NFL) in the 1970s. He played college football for the Purdue Boilermakers and was selected by the Baltimore Colts in the 1976 NFL draft.

== Biography ==
=== Early life ===
Ken Novak was born July 3, 1954 in Willowick, Ohio, a suburb of Cleveland, where he attended Saint Mary Magdalene grade school. He went to St. Joseph High School, a private preparatory school in suburban Cleveland, where he earned six athletic letters participating in football, basketball, and track and field. He was the Ohio State discus champion in 1972, recording a throw of 179–6.

=== College career ===
He received an athletic scholarship from Purdue University where he became a standout defensive lineman. During his three years of varsity eligibility — 1973, 1974, and 1975 — Novak started in 31 of 33 games, making a total of 229 tackles, including 87 during his senior year.

Big Ten Conference sportswriters named him Lineman of the Year in 1974 and he was named to Football Writers of America and Sporting News All-America teams as a senior in 1975.

=== Professional career ===
Strong enough to bench-press 475 pounds, the 6-foot-7 Novak was regarded as a top tier professional football prospect and was selected 20th overall by the Baltimore Colts of the National Football League (NFL) in the first round of the 1976 NFL draft.

Novak was unable to crack the Colts' starting roster, however, and was limited to a reserve role as a defensive tackle. He saw action in 11 games off the bench for the Colts in 1976, recording a quarterback sack among his six solo tackles during this rookie year.

During the 1977 season he was similarly filled mostly a reserve role, contributing just 8 tackles (4 solo) and a fumble recovery in the 12 games in which he saw action.

Unable to live up to the lofty expectations of his draft position, the Colts released Novak on August 29, 1978, just ahead of the 1978 season. He remained a free agent until signed by the Cleveland Browns on December 15 of that year — just two days before the final game of the season, in which he did not play.

The Browns released Novak on August 6, 1979, and he was claimed the next day on waivers by the Minnesota Vikings. He did not report, however, and was on retired reserve for the entire 1979 NFL season. He was reinstated on May 20, 1980, but did not play in the NFL again.
