= Gordon Bell (American football) =

American football player (born 1953)

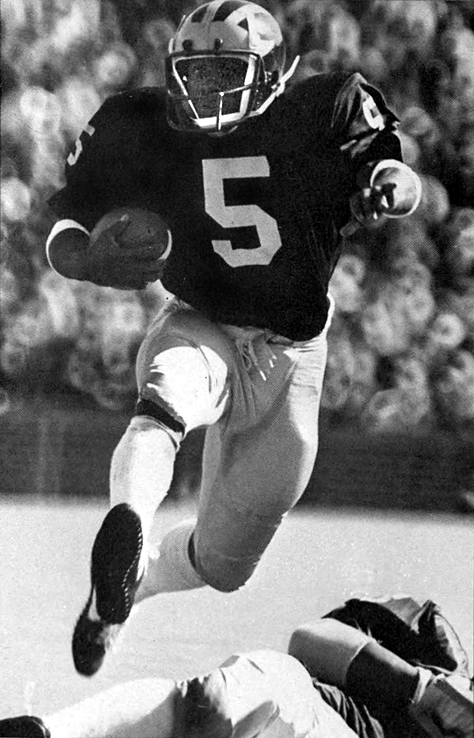
- Bell from 1976 Michiganensian

No. 5, 25, 20
- Position: Tailback/KR/PR

Personal information
- Born: December 25, 1953 (age 72); Troy, Ohio, U.S.
- Listed height: 5 ft 9 in (1.75 m)
- Listed weight: 180 lb (82 kg)

Career information
- High school: Troy (OH)
- College: Michigan (1973-1975)
- NFL draft: 1976: 4th round, 104th overall pick

Career history
- New York Giants (1976–1977); Green Bay Packers (1978)*; St. Louis Cardinals (1978)
- * Offseason or practice squad member only

Awards and highlights
- Third-team All-American (1975); First-team All-Big Ten (1975); Second-team All-Big Ten (1974); Big Ten rushing champion; Big Ten Championship team (2x); Michigan single-season records All-purpose yards (1975-87) Carries (1975-87) 100-yard rushing games (1975-87)

Career NFL statistics
- Rushing yards: 319
- Receiving yards: 259
- Return yards: 866
- Stats at Pro Football Reference

Gordon Granville Bell (born December 25, 1953) is an American former professional football player who was a running back, kickoff returner and punt returner who played for the Michigan Wolverines from 1973 to 1975, and professionally for the New York Giants (1976-1977) and St. Louis Cardinals (1978) of the National Football League (NFL).

Bell was a two-time All-Ohio running back in high school and led Ohio's Troy High School to undefeated seasons in 1970 and 1971. As a 16-year-old junior, he rushed for 324 yards in a single game; for the year he had 1,593 yards rushing and scored 146 points. As a senior in 1971, he lost the Ohio AAA high school back of the year award to Archie Griffin.

Bell played tailback for Michigan teams that had a combined record of 28-3-3 from 1973 to 1975. As a junior in 1974, Bell was a part-time player who started only three of Michigan's eleven games, but he still managed to become only the third player in school history to rush for 1,000 yards in a season. In 1975, he set several single-season school records, including most all-purpose yards (1,714 yards), most 100-yard rushing games (eight), and most rushing attempts (273). At the time of his graduation from Michigan, Bell also ranked second in school history in career rushing yards and third in all-purpose yards. Though Bell's records have been surpassed in more recent years, he remains one of the all-time rushing leaders in Michigan history. Despite his accomplishments, Bell played in the shadow of Big Ten Conference rival, Archie Griffin, who won back-to-back Heisman Trophies. In some respects, Bell exceeded even Griffin's accomplishments, as Bell won the 1975 Big Ten rushing championship.

Bell played three years of professional football, but never made it into the starting lineup for an NFL team. In three NFL seasons, he had 1,444 all-purpose yards. His best NFL season was 1976, when he had 784 all-purpose yards.

== Youth ==
A native of Troy, Ohio, Bell had attended Ohio State Buckeyes games with his father from the age of six. In high school, he was one of the top football prospects in Ohio. As a junior at Troy High School in 1970, Bell gained over 1,593 yards, scored 146 points, led Troy High to its first unbeaten season (10-0) since 1957, and was named to the Associated Press 1970 All-Ohio Class AAA high school first team. In the 1970 season opener, 16-year-old Bell rushed for 324 yards and scored four touchdowns in a 54–6 win over Piqua High School. Afterward, Bell said, "All I can say is that my line was tremendous." Piqua's coach said, "Our kids were on Bell from the start, but they just couldn't bring him down." In October 1970, Bell put on "one of the greatest one-man shows ever seen at Beavercreek," scoring three touchdowns and rushing for 233 yards in 30 carries. The Beavercreek coach said afterward that the game's turning point came the moment Bell walked onto the field.

As a senior in 1971, Bell led Troy High to a 10–0 record. In the season opener, Bell broke off tackle and rushed 70 yards for a touchdown the first time he got the ball. He scored touchdowns in three of his first four carries, though one was nullified by a penalty. Bell rushed for 190 yards and three touchdowns in the season opener. The opposing coach said, "It was the same old story. We knew we had to stop Bell and yet we still couldn't do it. That boy is a great football player." Bell again won first-team All-Ohio honors, but he lost the Associated Press 1971 Ohio AAA high school back of the year award. The award instead went to a high school senior from Columbus, Archie Griffin. Bell and Griffin would continue their rivalry in college.

In 1971, Bell also won the Piqua YMCA high school weight-lifting contest in the 165-pound class.

== University of Michigan ==
=== Overview ===
Bell was recruited to the University of Michigan by assistant coach Gary Moeller. He was a relatively small player, standing 5 feet 9 inches (1.75 m) tall, and weighing 178 pounds (81 kg; 12.7 st). He was sometimes referred to as Michigan's "mighty mite tailback." In addition to his speed, what set him apart from other backs was his ability to cut and find the smallest of holes. Bo Schembechler called Bell "the greatest cutback runner I've ever coached." In 1975, the Associated Press noted: "Bell is noted for his ability to cut on a dime, spurt through miniscule [sic] holes and hurdle tacklers. He's got fine speed and he's durable. Bell seems to get -- pardon the expression -- his bell rung on many tackles, only to bounce up as if nothing happened." Noted Michigan radio broadcaster Bob Ufer often referred to Bell as "little Gordie Bell." Ufer once humorously said, referring to Bell's ability to shift directions quickly, that Bell "could run fifteen minutes in a phone booth and never touch the sides."

In his career at Michigan, Bell gained 2,902 rushing yards in 535 carries, and scored 28 rushing touchdowns. In addition to running from scrimmage, Bell ran back 12 kickoffs for an average of 26.4 yards.

=== 1973 season ===
As a sophomore in 1973, Bell saw his first action against Iowa. He was given five carries and gained 50 yards (including a 24-yard gain) for a ten-yard per carry average. Bell did not start any games in 1973, but his playing time increased later in the season, including 19 carries against Minnesota for 73 yards and 15 carries against Indiana for 89 yards. For the season, Bell rushed for 464 yards in 88 carries. The 1973 team finished with a record of 10–0–1, with the only imperfection coming at the end of the season with a 10–10 tie with Ohio State. Despite tying for the Big Ten Conference championship, Big Ten athletic directors decided to send Ohio State to the Rose Bowl, and conference rules did not permit Michigan to play in another bowl game. Michigan ended up ranked number 6 in the final Associated Press poll.

=== 1974 season ===
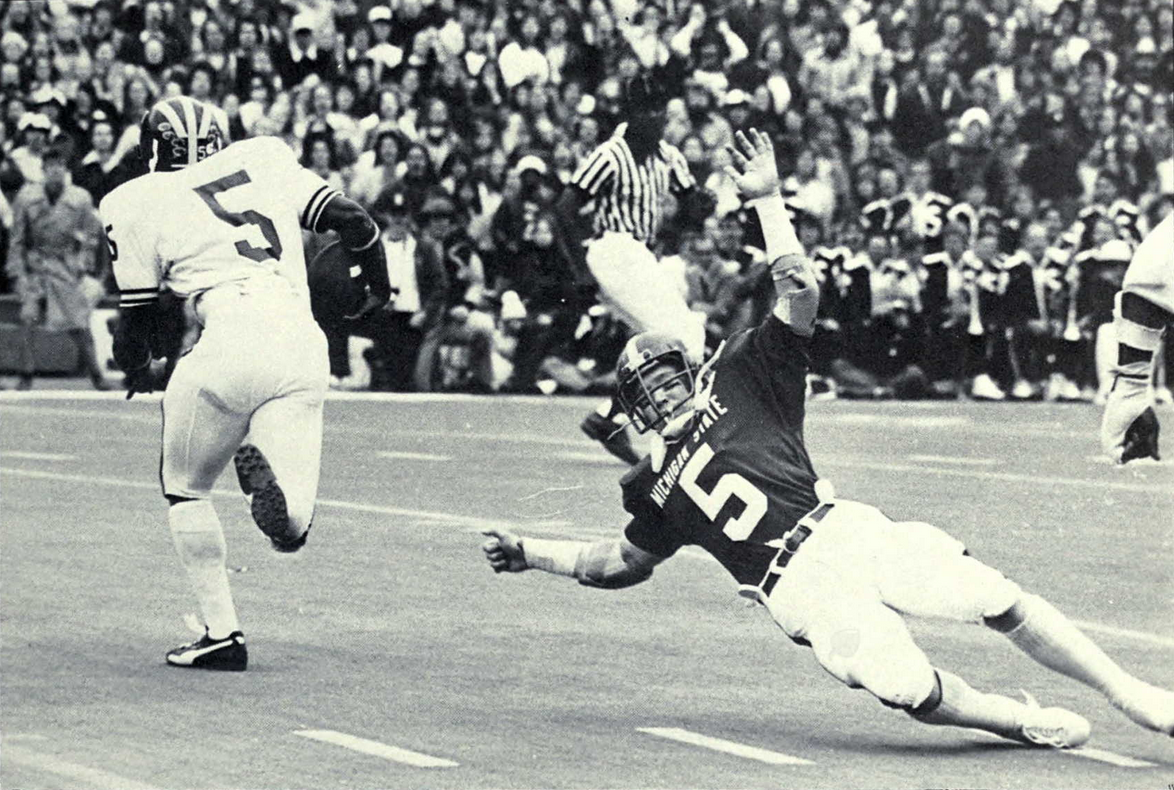
Bell eludes a Michigan State defender, 1975

For the 1974 season, Bell rushed for 1048 yards which was, at that time, the third highest single-season total in school history. He joined Ron Johnson and Billy Taylor as the only players in Michigan history to rush for 1,000 yards in a season. Bell accomplished the feat despite being a part-time player, sharing the starting tailback job with sophomore Rob Lytle. In the 1974 campaign, Lytle started eight games to Bell's three, although Bell outrushed Lytle 1048 yards to 802. Bell had lost about 10 pounds (4.5 kg; 0.71 st) in the summer before the 1974 season, dropping to 175 pounds (79 kg; 12.5 st). He said, "I did it on my own to help me run, to make me quicker."

Asked in 1974 about his alternating Lytle and Bell at the tailback position, Bo Schembechler said: "They're both good. They have equal ability and they both deserve to play.", Bell said at the time that he did not mind sharing playing time with Lytle because "we're both pretty fair backs. It's only fair that we share it." In an October 1974 win over Minnesota (by a score of 49–0), Bell and Lytle combined for 292 rushing yards—158 for Lytle and 134 for Bell.

In Michigan's 51–0 victory over Purdue in November 1974, Bell rushed for 166 yards in 22 carries for a 7.2 yards per carry average. He also set up a field goal and another touchdown with runs of 32 and 39 yards. Bell was named the UPI's Midwest offensive player of the week for the effort. When a reporter asked Bell for a comment, he said, "Coach doesn't want us to say anything this week. We've got to get ready for Ohio State."

After Bell and Lytle combined for 1,850 rushing yards in 1974, Schembechler said: "Bell and Lytle are the greatest combination in the country. Bell is the best cut runner I've ever had. Lytle is a great power runner. The tailback position is healthy to say the least."

=== 1975 season ===
In both 1975, Bell again shared the Michigan backfield duties with Rob Lytle. Bell was a senior in 1975 on a Michigan team that went 8–2–2 and finished the season ranked #8 in the final Associated Press poll. Bell rushed for 1,390 yards, added 314 yards on kickoff returns, and was voted the team's Most Valuable Player.

Michigan started the 1975 season ranked #3 in the country, and moved into the #2 spot with a 23–6 win over Wisconsin in the season opener. Despite being hampered by a muscle pull, Bell still rushed for 210 yards in 28 carries against Wisconsin. After the game, Bell noted that he "couldn't cut as well as (he) would have liked," but he played through the injury realizing that, as a senior, "the coaches expect us to show the way." On being named the UPI's Midwest Back of the Week, Bell noted, "It's really an honor to be recognized like that, but you have to have a lot of help out there. I thought Rick Leach was just super in the game. He sure didn't look like a freshman. And our offensive line did the job despite having so many sophomores in there." Bell's 210-yard performance against Wisconsin stood as the school record in a season opener for 28 years until Chris Perry rushed for 232 yards in the 2003 season opener against Central Michigan.

After the opener against Wisconsin, Bell and the Wolverines tied games against Stanford (19–19) and Baylor (14–14). Despite being favored by 18 points over Baylor, the Wolverines nearly lost and fell out of the top 10 in national ranking for the first time since September 1972. After the Baylor game, Schembechler said the team lacked leadership. Bell may have been the one player to whom Bo's criticism did not apply, as he had a career-long 64-yard kickoff return against Baylor, scored both of Michigan's touchdowns, and rushed for 89 yards in 26 carries. Bell's second touchdown against Baylor came with 6:50 remaining in the fourth quarter and saved the Wolverines from a defeat.

The Wolverines rebounded into the top 10 with a 31–7 victory over Missouri in the fourth game of the season and strung together seven straight wins before facing Ohio State. Bell rushed for 119 yards against Missouri and had 150 all-purpose yards. In a 16–6 win over Michigan State in week five, Bell scored Michigan's only touchdown on a 19-yard run in the fourth quarter. The Wolverines beat Northwestern Wildcats, 69–0, in week six. For the first time in Michigan history, the Wolverines had three backs who each rushed for at least 100 yards. As the starting back, Bell rushed for 100 yards and scored two touchdowns in the first quarter alone. With the game turning into a blowout, Schembechler pulled Bell after the first quarter, and Rob Lytle gained another 105 yards, before being replaced by Harlan Huckleby who gained 157 yards. Michigan tied the modern Big Ten record of 573 rushing yards in the game.

In a 28–21 win against Minnesota, Bell rushed for 174 yards on 31 carries for his fifth consecutive 100-yard game. He also scored two touchdowns, including a 23-yard run midway through the fourth quarter. The UPI noted: "Bell's clinching run came with 8:04 gone in the final quarter and saved Michigan from the embarrassment of a tie." Bell's performance in the Minnesota game gave him 2,488 career rushing yards, second in school history to Billy Taylor's record of 3,072 yards. In a close 21–15 win over Illinois, Bell scored two first-quarter touchdowns and carried the ball a career-high 35 times. Going into the Ohio State game, Bell was in a three-person contest for the Big Ten Conference rushing championship. Bell led with an average of 134.1 yards per conference game to 125.1 for Billy Marek of Wisconsin, and 123.7 for Archie Griffin.

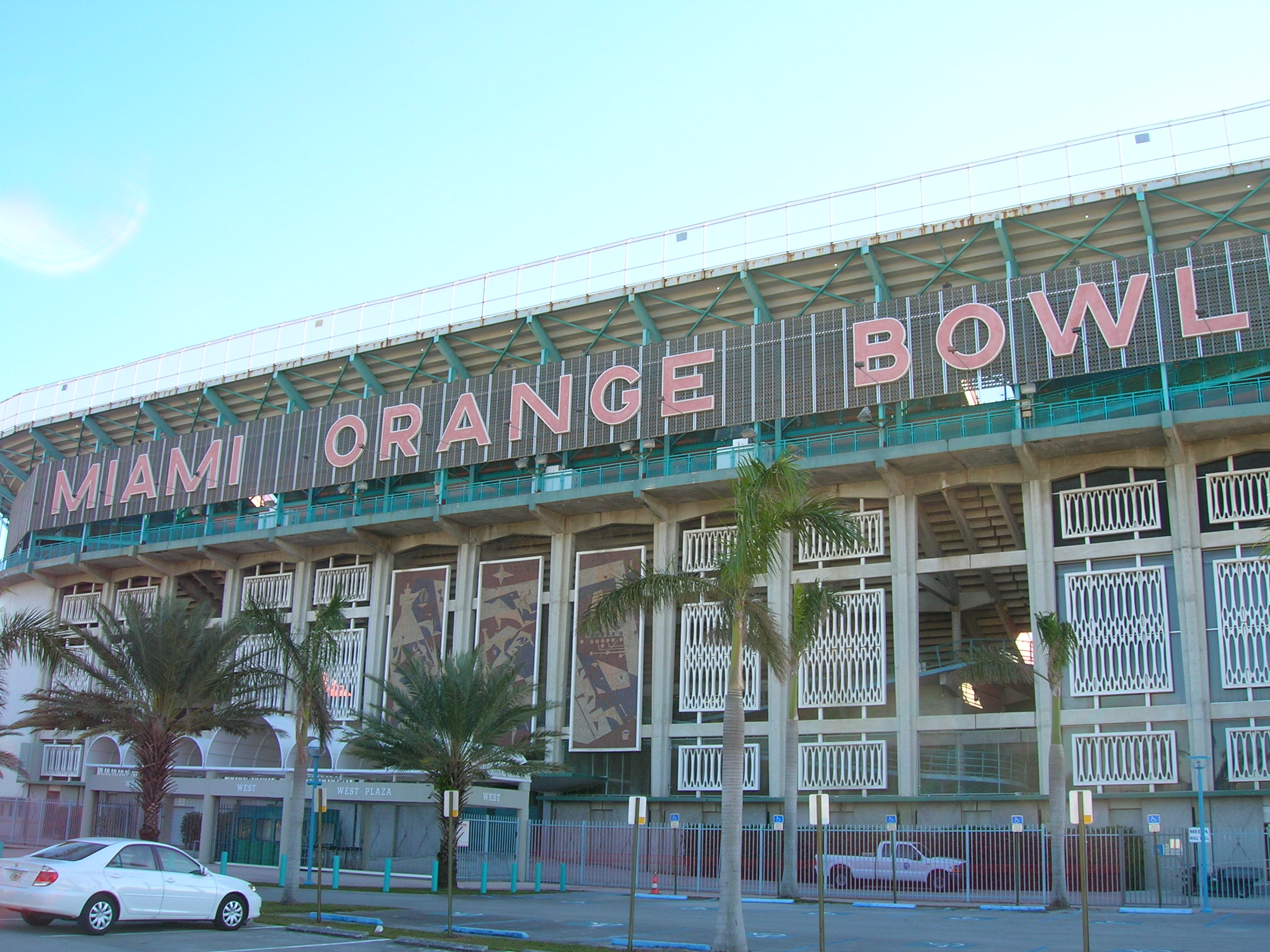
Bell's only bowl game was in the 1976 Orange Bowl.

Michigan ended the season with a 21–14 loss to Ohio State. Despite the loss, Bell won the battle of the backs, rushing for 124 yards on 21 carries and throwing for a touchdown pass, while Griffin was limited to 46 yards on 19 carries. Bell had 166 all-purpose yards against the Buckeyes, his last regular season game for Michigan. In his only bowl game appearance, Bell played in a 14–6 loss to the Oklahoma Sooners in Orange Bowl after the 1975 season. He gained 53 yards rushing and 90 all-purpose yards.

=== Comparisons to Archie Griffin ===
Bell was Michigan's starting running back in the same years in which Archie Griffin won consecutive Heisman Trophies for Ohio State. In head-to-head meetings in 1974 and 1975, Bell played as well or better than Griffin. In 1974, each carried the ball 25 times, and Bell ended up with 108 yards compared with 111 yards for Griffin although Ohio State won the game 12–10. In 1975, Bell outgained Griffin 124 yards to 46 yards. Bell averaged 132.9 yards per game in 1975 to lead Griffin and the Big Ten Conference in conference game rushing. Even so, Griffin won the Heisman Trophy, and Bell finished eighth in the 1975 Heisman Trophy voting.

During the 1975 season, Bell was asked how he felt about all the publicity being received by Griffin. He replied: "All of the publicity in the world doesn't help you win. I don't feel slighted because Archie is in our conference. I feel I'm just as good as he is." Bell later recalled: "Those two games against Ohio State were my biggest, and I consider the second game a personal victory. I outrushed Archie, but he had a great public relations guy in Woody Hayes. . . . He wasn't the best player in the conference so how can he be the best player in the country?"

Lee Larkins, who played for Purdue and was one of the top defensive backs in the Big Ten, said in 1976 that Bell was the best running back he ever played against. As a senior, Larkins played against Gordon Bell, Archie Griffin, and Ricky Bell of USC. Larkins said: "Gordon Bell was the best of the three. He was a super tough runner and a tough guy to make a solid tackle on. Gordon has a lot more speed and more moves than Archie does, and I thought he was a better all around player."

=== Relationship with Bo Schembechler ===
During Bell's years at Michigan, he played for the Wolverines' legendary coach, Bo Schembechler. Near the end of Bell's freshman year, Bell told Schembechler he was taking an incomplete in a course. Schembechler talked to Bell's father, Trenton Bell, about the incomplete. Schembechler recalled, "Trenton told me (Gordon)'d be back to finish that course. And he was." Schembechler added, "Gordie listens to Trenton. What he says gets done."

Schembechler described Gordon Bell as "a very, very durable guy." Bo noted: "He isn't exactly frail. He's put together well. He's a confident guy. Exciting and good as he is, he's also one of the nicest guys you'll ever meet."

As Archie Griffin garnered the lion's share of the media attention in 1975, Schembechler spoke out for Bell: "I think Bell's as good as any back there is anywhere. I haven't seen any who looks better. . . . He is certainly the most underpublicized great back in the country."

=== Records and honors ===
Bell finished the 1975 season as the Big Ten's leading rusher, was selected to the Associated Press All-Big Ten team, was chosen as Michigan's Most Valuable Player, and finished eighth in the Heisman Trophy voting. In a year with an abundance of strong running backs, Bell and Earl Campbell were relegated to the AP's third-team All-American, as Archie Griffin and Ricky Bell took first-team honors, and Tony Dorsett and Jimmy DuBose took second-team honors.

Bell's career at Michigan was among the best in school history to that point. His school records included:

- Bell set the single-season all-purpose yards record in 1975 with 1,714 yards. Bell's record stood until 1987 when it was broken by Jamie Morris. Bell's total ranked eighth on Michigan's all-time list at the end of 2006.
- Bell's 273 carries in 1975 broke Ron Johnson's record of 255 carries set in 1968. Bell's total remained the school record until 1987 when Jamie Morris carried the ball 282 times. Bell's 1975 performance now ranks eighth on the all-time Michigan list.
- In 1975, Bell set the Michigan record with eight 100-yard rushing games. That record stood for 12 years until Jamie Morris compiled ten in 1987.
- Bell's 1,390 yards rushing in 1975 was the second best single-season total in school history, just one yard short of the record set by Ron Johnson in 1967. Bell's 1975 total now ranks 11th best in school history.
- At the end of the 1975 season, Bell had rushed for a career total of 2,902 yards, second best in school history behind Billy Taylor's record of 3,072 yards. Bell's career total still ranks ninth best in school history.
- Bell's 210-yard rushing game in the season opener against Wisconsin was the fourth best in school history at the time, behind Ron Johnson's 347-yard game against the Badgers in 1968. Bell is one of twelve backs in Michigan history to rush for 200 yards in a game.
- Bell's 13 rushing touchdowns in 1975 was the second best in school history, behind Ron Johnson's 19 touchdowns in 1968. His total is now tied for 11th best in school history.
- Bell's 28 career rushing touchdowns ranked third in school history, behind Billy Taylor and Tom Harmon.
- Bell finished his career at Michigan ranked second behind Bob Nussbaumer in career yards per carry and now ranks ninth.
- Bell's 35 carries against Illinois in 1975 was the second most in school history at the time, behind Ron Johnson's 42-carry performance in 1967. He is now tied for twelfth in school history.
- Bell's 535 career carries was second to Billy Taylor at the time of Bell's graduation. It now ranks tenth.
- Bell ranked third in career all-purpose yards (behind Ron Johnson and Billy Taylor).

== Professional career ==
=== New York Giants ===
Bell was selected by the New York Giants in the fourth round of the 1976 NFL draft. Bell did not get much playing time early in the 1976 season with the Giants. In late November, columnist David Bushnell wrote an article, "Are Giants missing the boat on Gordon Bell?," questioning the team's lack of utilization of Bell. Bushnell noted that Bell had "spent most of the season standing on the sideline waiting to be inserted into the lineup for a few plays." The Giants' starting running back in 1976 was Doug Kotar, though Bushnell opined that Bell was the superior back: "Bell is quick, with speed to break any play for a long gain, and he can catch the ball. . . . If the Giants are trying to break Bell in gradually, they might just miss the boat totally, breaking Bell instead." Bell noted at the time that the lack of playing time held him back: "It takes me about a quarter or so to get going, break a sweat and get the legs loosened up. I really don't like being shuffled in and out so much, but as a rookie I can't do much about it." Bell also added, "Sure it's been hard for me to be a spot player, especially because my body isn't ideal for that type job. I think it's better for me to play a lot, but then again I'm not the coach."

The 1976 Giants, who started 0–7 under Bill Arnsparger before going 3–4 under John McVay, had a diversified offense in which Bell was second on the team with 25 receptions for 198 yards. When Kotar was injured, Bell got his first start of the 1976 season on November 27, 1976. Bell rushed for two touchdowns in a 28-16 victory over the Seattle Seahawks. He posted the best day of his professional career, with touchdown runs of two and 21 yards, gaining 56 yards on the ground and 41 more on pass receptions. After the game, Bell said, "I needed a game like that." The backfield was led by Doug Kotar and Larry Csonka with Bell being the third leading rusher.

Having seen little playing time as a rookie in 1976, Bell played even less in 1977, as the Giants worked Bob Hammond and Willie Spencer into the rushing rotation. Bell rushed for 63 yards in 16 carries for the entire 1977 season. His main contribution to the 1977 Giants was as a kickoff returner, as he returned 12 kickoffs for 235 yards, second best on the Giants after Hammond.

=== St. Louis Cardinals ===
During 1978, he was briefly on the Green Bay Packers roster during training camp, and he signed with the St. Louis Cardinals in November. In 1978, Bell had more kickoff returns (eight) than rushes (seven) with St. Louis.

== Later life ==
After retiring from football, Bell ran a barbecue restaurant in Dayton, Ohio. He later sold radio advertising in Detroit, Michigan and Chicago, Illinois.

== Career statistics ==
Year	Team	Games	Rushes	Yards	Avg.	TDs	Rec.	Yards	Avg.	TDs	Kickoffs	Yards	Avg.	TDs	Punts	Yards	Avg.	TDs
1973	Michigan	10	88	464	5.3	4	2	8	4	0	2	47	23.5	0	0	0	0	0
1974	Michigan	11	174	1048	6	11	1	11	11	0	1	40	40	0	0	0	0	0
1975	Michigan	12	273	1390	5.1	13	7	84	12	1	9	227	25.2	0	4	18	4.5	0
	TOTAL	33	535	2902	5.4	28	10	103	10.3	1	12	314	26.2	0	4	18	4.5	0

Year	Team	Games	Rushes	Yards	Avg.	TDs	Rec.	Yards	Avg.	TDs	Kickoffs	Yards	Avg.	TDs	Punts	Yards	Avg.	TDs
1976	NYG	14	67	233	3.5	2	25	198	7.9	0	18	352	19.6	0	1	1	1	0
1977	NYG	10	16	63	3.9	0	4	33	8.3	0	12	235	19.6	0	1	0	0	0
1978	St. Louis	6	7	23	3.3	0	3	28	9.3	0	8	177	22.1	0	14	101	7.2	0
	TOTAL	30	90	319	3.5	2	30	259	8.1	0	38	764	20.1	0	16	102	6.4	0

== See also ==
- Lists of Michigan Wolverines football rushing leaders
