= Blane Smith =

American football player (born 1954)

No. 56
- Position: Linebacker

Personal information
- Born: July 13, 1954 (age 72); West Memphis, Arkansas, U.S.
- Listed height: 6 ft 5 in (1.96 m)
- Listed weight: 248 lb (112 kg)

Career information
- High school: Gary (IN) Theodore Roosevelt
- College: Purdue (1973–1976)
- NFL draft: 1977: 7th round, 184th overall pick

Career history
- Cleveland Browns (1977)*; Green Bay Packers (1977); New York Jets (1978)*
- * Offseason or practice squad member only

Awards and highlights
- 2× First-team All-Big Ten (1975, 1976)

Career NFL statistics
- Games played: 1
- Stats at Pro Football Reference

Blane E. Smith (born July 13, 1954) is an American former professional football player. He played college football for the Purdue Boilermakers and was selected in the seventh round of the 1977 National Football League (NFL) draft by the Cleveland Browns. He later appeared in one game for the Green Bay Packers as a linebacker and was also a member of the New York Jets.

== Early life ==
Smith was born on July 13, 1954, in West Memphis, Arkansas. He was one of 15 children and moved with his family to Gary, Indiana, around age three. He grew up in Gary with many of his siblings in a two-room house, describing his living conditions as like "sardines in a can". He told the Journal and Courier:

I was seven years old before I slept in a bed. And those beds were crowded. One of us would have the top, another in the middle and one or two at the bottom. We got enough to eat, but not meat. We got our protein from beans.

Smith played basketball and football growing up and declared that he would be a future first-round NFL draft selection while in sixth grade. In football, he played as a defensive end, following after his older brother, Sterling, who played at the position in high school. His favorite player was Willie Davis of the Green Bay Packers. He attended Theodore Roosevelt High School in Gary and was recruited to play basketball for several colleges, but instead chose to play college football for the Purdue Boilermakers.

== College career ==
Smith enrolled at Purdue University in 1973 and played for the Boilermakers from 1974 to 1976. He broke out as one of the top defensive ends in the Big Ten Conference in 1975, being selected first-team All-Big Ten. He was Purdue's sole player on the Associated Press All-Big Ten team for the 1975 season. Standing at 6 feet 5 inches (1.96 m) and weighing 227 pounds (103 kg), Smith was named the defensive team captain as a senior in 1976. He was named first-team All-Big Ten for a second time in 1976 and was part of a defense that held No. 1-ranked Michigan to 14 points, with the Boilermakers winning the game in an upset. The Journal and Courier later named the Smith the best player in Purdue history to wear jersey number 91.

== Professional career ==
Smith was invited to the 1977 Senior Bowl, where he was used as an emergency tight end following an injury to another player. His performance at the position impressed Cleveland Browns head coach Forrest Gregg, and thus the Browns selected Smith in the seventh round (184th overall) of the 1977 NFL draft to play tight end. He signed with the Browns on June 27, 1977. He was released on August 31, 1977, with coach Gregg citing his struggles with catching the football. In November, he signed with the Green Bay Packers to play linebacker. He made his NFL debut in the final game of the season, appearing in the Packers' 16–14 win over the San Francisco 49ers. He was released by the Packers in 1978 and then acquired off waivers by the New York Jets on June 19, 1978. He was released by the Jets the following month, ending his professional career. He finished with one NFL game played.
