= Terry Stieve =

American football player (born 1954)

No. 68
- Position: Guard

Personal information
- Born: March 10, 1954 (age 72); Baraboo, Wisconsin, U.S.
- Listed height: 6 ft 2 in (1.88 m)
- Listed weight: 256 lb (116 kg)

Career information
- High school: Baraboo
- College: Wisconsin
- NFL draft: 1976: 6th round, 160th overall pick

Career history
- New Orleans Saints (1976–1977); St. Louis Cardinals (1978–1984)

Awards and highlights
- First-team All-Big Ten (1975); Second-team All-Big Ten (1974)

Career NFL statistics
- Games played: 113
- Games started: 98
- Fumble recoveries: 2
- Stats at Pro Football Reference

Terry Allan Stieve (born March 10, 1954) is an American former professional football player who was an offensive lineman in the National Football League (NFL). He played college football for the Wisconsin Badgers and was selected in the 1976 NFL draft by the New Orleans Saints. He played for the Saints from 1976 to 1977 and for the St. Louis Cardinals from 1978 to 1979 and from 1981 to 1984. Stieve missed the entire 1980 season due to a knee injury.
