= Tommy Hannon =

American football player (born 1955)

No. 45
- Position: Safety

Personal information
- Born: March 5, 1955 (age 71); Massillon, Ohio, U.S.
- Listed height: 5 ft 11 in (1.80 m)
- Listed weight: 193 lb (88 kg)

Career information
- High school: Massillon Washington
- College: Michigan State
- NFL draft: 1977: 3rd round, 83rd overall pick

Career history
- Minnesota Vikings (1977–1984)

Awards and highlights
- 2× First-team All-Big Ten (1975, 1976)

Career NFL statistics
- Interceptions: 15
- Fumble recoveries: 13
- Defensive touchdowns: 1
- Stats at Pro Football Reference

Thomas Edward Hannon (born March 5, 1955) is an American former professional football player. He played as a safety for nine seasons in the National Football League (NFL) with the Minnesota Vikings. He was a starter in 103 of the 117 games he played for the Vikings, including every non-strike game in his last six NFL seasons. Hannon had 15 interceptions in his NFL career. An interception was perhaps the top highlight of his career; he ran a first quarter interception back 41 yards for his only NFL touchdown in a 34–14 Vikings victory over the Chicago Bears in 1980. Prior to playing in the NFL, he was a four-year letterman at Michigan State.
