= 1975 All-Big Ten Conference football team =

American college football all-star team

The 1975 All-Big Ten Conference football team consists of American football players chosen by various organizations for All-Big Ten Conference teams for the 1975 Big Ten Conference football season.

== Offensive selections ==
=== Quarterbacks ===
- Cornelius Greene, Ohio State (AP-1; UPI-1)
- Tony Dungy, Minnesota (AP-2; UPI-2)

=== Running backs ===
- Gordon Bell, Michigan (AP-1; UPI-1)
- Archie Griffin, Ohio State (AP-1; UPI-1)
- Billy Marek, Wisconsin (AP-1; UPI-2)
- Pete Johnson, Ohio State (AP-2; UPI-1)
- Mike Pruitt, Purdue (UPI-2)
- Courtney Snyder, Indiana (UPI-2)
- Greg Boykin, Northwestern (AP-2)
- Lonnie Perrin, Illinois (AP-2)

=== Wide receivers ===
- Jim Smith, Michigan (AP-1; UPI-1)
- Scott Yelvington, Northwestern (AP-2; UPI-2)

=== Tight ends ===
- Joe Smalzer, Illinois (AP-1)
- Mike Cobb, Michigan State (AP-2; UPI-1)
- Brandt Yocum, Iowa (UPI-2)

=== Centers ===
- Paul Jasinskis, Northwestern (AP-1; UPI-2)
- Jim Czirr, Michigan (UPI-1)
- Jim Shuck, Indiana (AP-2)

=== Guards ===
- Terry Stieve, Wisconsin (AP-1; UPI-1)
- Ted Smith, Ohio State (AP-1; UPI-2)
- Joe Devlin, Iowa (AP-2; UPI-1)
- Mark Donahue, Michigan (UPI-2)
- Bill Lukens, Ohio State (AP-2)

=== Tackles ===
- Scott Dannelley, Ohio State (AP-1; UPI-2)
- Rod Walters, Iowa (AP-1)
- Dennis Lick, Wisconsin (UPI-1)
- Chris Ward, Ohio State (AP-2; UPI-1)
- Ken Long, Purdue (UPI-2)
- Stu Levenick, Illinois (AP-2)

== Defensive selections ==
=== Defensive ends ===
- Dan Jilek, Michigan (AP-1; UPI-1)
- Bob Brudzinski, Ohio State (UPI-1)
- Pat Curto, Ohio State (UPI-2)
- Dennis Stejskal, Wisconsin (AP-2; UPI-2)

=== Defensive tackles ===
- Nick Buonamici, Ohio State (AP-1; UPI-1)
- Keith Simons, Minnesota (AP-1; UPI-2)
- Greg Morton, Michigan (AP-2; UPI-1)
- Greg Schaum, Ohio State (UPI-2)
- Ken Novak, Purdue (AP-2)
- Ed Beamon, Ohio State (AP-2)
- Dave Bryant, Iowa (AP-2)

=== Nose guards ===
- Tim Davis, Michigan (AP-1; UPI-1)
- Aaron Brown, Ohio State (UPI-2)

=== Linebackers ===
- Donnie Thomas, Indiana (AP-1; UPI-1)
- Ed Thompson, Ohio State (AP-1; UPI-2)
- Blane Smith, Purdue (AP-1)
- Calvin O'Neal, Michigan (AP-2; UPI-1)
- Andre Jackson, Iowa (AP-2; UPI-2)
- Scott Studwell, Illinois (AP-2)

=== Defensive backs ===
- Don Dufek, Michigan (AP-1 [linebacker]; UPI-1)
- Tim Fox, Ohio State (AP-1; UPI-1)
- Tom Hannon, Michigan State (AP-1; UPI-1)
- Pete Shaw, Northwestern (AP-1; UPI-1)
- Bruce Beaman, Illinois (AP-2; UPI-2)
- Doug Beaudoin, Minnesota (AP-2; UPI-2)
- Craig Cassady, Ohio State (UPI-2)
- Jim Pickens, Michigan (UPI-2)
- Steve Wagner, Wisconsin (AP-2)

== Special teams ==
=== Placekicker ===
- Dan Beaver, Illinois (AP-1; UPI-1)

=== Punter ===
- Tom Skladany, Ohio State (AP-1; UPI-1)

== Key ==
AP = Associated Press, selected by a panel of sportswriters and broadcasters from throughout the Midwest

UPI = United Press International, as chosen by the Big Ten coaches for the UPI

Bold = Consensus first-team selection of the AP and UPI

== See also ==
- 1975 College Football All-America Team
