= Tom Skladany =

American football player (born 1955)

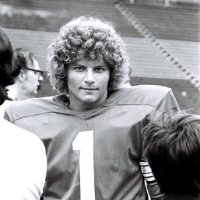

No. 15, 1, 5
- Position: Punter

Personal information
- Born: June 29, 1955 (age 71); Bethel Park, Pennsylvania, U.S.
- Listed height: 6 ft 0 in (1.83 m)
- Listed weight: 192 lb (87 kg)

Career information
- High school: Bethel Park
- College: Ohio State
- NFL draft: 1977: 2nd round, 46th overall pick

Career history
- Cleveland Browns (1977)*; Detroit Lions (1978–1982); Philadelphia Eagles (1983)
- * Offseason or practice squad member only

Awards and highlights
- 2× First-team All-Pro (1978, 1981); Pro Bowl (1981); PFWA All-Rookie Team (1978); 3× First-team All-America (1974–1976); 2× First-team All-Big Ten (1975, 1976); Ohio State University Athletic Hall of Fame (1991)

Career NFL statistics
- Punts: 295
- Punting yards: 12,425
- Average punt: 42.1
- Longest punt: 74
- Stats at Pro Football Reference

Thomas Edward Skladany (/skləˈdeɪni/ sklə-DAY-nee; born June 29, 1955) is an American former professional football player who was a punter in the National Football League (NFL), primarily with the Detroit Lions. He played college football for the Ohio State Buckeyes. A three-time first-team All-American, he is widely considered to be, along with Ray Guy, one of the two greatest punters in college history.

== Biography ==
Skladany later played in the NFL from 1978 to 1983. Skladany, the only three-time, first-team All-American punter in college history, made Big Ten history in 1973 when he became the first specialty player given a football scholarship in Big Ten football. Skladany was considered by Street & Smith's and Parade to be the consensus number one high school kicker and punter in America in 1972. Skladany turned down scholarship offers from Michigan, Penn State and hometown Pittsburgh to sign with Woody Hayes and Ohio State. Skladany was a three-time All-American at Ohio State University (1974–1976). He was inducted into the Ohio State University Athletic Hall of Fame in 1991.

Skladany, a second-round pick of the Cleveland Browns in 1977, made professional sports history when he held out the entire season in a contract dispute, becoming the first-ever NFL draft pick to hold out a full season. His rights were traded to the Detroit Lions after the 1977 season. Skladany was selected to the Pro Bowl after the 1981 season and named first-team All Pro in 1978 and 1981. A back injury ended Skladany's career prematurely in 1983 while punting for the Philadelphia Eagles.

Skladany comes from a football family of note. Tom's uncle, Leo blocked a field goal as regulation time expired in the 1949 NFL championship game to propel the Philadelphia Eagles to the NFL title over the Los Angeles Rams. Another uncle, Joe "Muggsy" Skladany is a member of the College Football Hall of Fame and played for the Pittsburgh Steelers in 1941 before enlisting in World War II. Tom's uncle Ed Skladany turned down the Chicago Bears to sign with the Cincinnati Reds in 1945. Tom's brother Joe Skladany was an All-American linebacker at LaFayette University in 1981, and played for Arizona Wranglers of the USFL in 1982.

After retiring from the NFL in 1983, Tom opened an American Speedy Printing Center in suburban Columbus, Ohio, and raised four daughters, all of whom played Division I collegiate soccer. His daughter, Karly, married *NSYNC singer Chris Kirkpatrick in 2013, and his youngest daughter, Camryn, has excelled both athletically and professionally. Camryn is currently a leading executive in the professional staffing and recruitment industry. Tom Skladany is a past President of the NFL Alumni Association of Ohio (1989–2013).
