= Greg Boykin =

American football player (born 1953)

No. 20, 33, 36
- Position: Running back

Personal information
- Born: December 8, 1953 (age 72); Ravenna, Ohio, U.S.
- Listed height: 6 ft 0 in (1.83 m)
- Listed weight: 225 lb (102 kg)

Career information
- High school: Kent (OH) Theodore Roosevelt
- College: Northwestern
- NFL draft: 1977: 7th round, 174th overall pick

Career history
- New Orleans Saints (1977); San Francisco 49ers (1978)

Awards and highlights
- 2× Second-team All-Big Ten (1972, 1975)

Career NFL statistics
- Rushing attempts: 107
- Rushing yards: 352
- Receptions: 22
- Receiving yards: 133
- Total TDs: 2
- Stats at Pro Football Reference

Greg Boykin (born December 8, 1953) is an American former National Football League (NFL) running back. He was born in Ravenna, Ohio, and grew up in neighboring Kent, where he attended Theodore Roosevelt High School. Boykin played college football for the Northwestern Wildcats and was later selected by the New Orleans Saints in the seventh round with the 174th overall pick in the 1977 NFL draft.

Boykin also played for the San Francisco 49ers in 1978.
