= Dennis Lick =

American football player (born 1954)

No. 70
- Position: Offensive tackle

Personal information
- Born: April 26, 1954 (age 72); Chicago, Illinois, U.S.
- Listed height: 6 ft 3 in (1.91 m)
- Listed weight: 266 lb (121 kg)

Career information
- High school: Chicago (IL) St. Rita
- College: Wisconsin
- NFL draft: 1976: 1st round, 8th overall pick

Career history
- Chicago Bears (1976–1982)

Awards and highlights
- PFWA All-Rookie Team (1976); Consensus All-American (1975); 2× First-team All-Big Ten (1974, 1975); Second-team All-Big Ten (1973)

Career NFL statistics
- Games played: 79
- Games started: 74
- Fumble recoveries: 1
- Stats at Pro Football Reference

Dennis Allan Lick (born April 26, 1954) is an American former professional football player who was an offensive tackle for the Chicago Bears. Lick played six seasons with the Bears from 1976 to 1981. He was signed out of the University of Wisconsin–Madison.

Lick attended St. Rita High School on Chicago's south side and resides in the Clearing neighborhood. He shares a distinction with two other NFL players that have also attended both St. Rita and the University of Wisconsin–Madison, Tony Simmons and Ahmad Merritt (Merritt also has played for the Bears).
