= Pete Shaw (American football) =

American football player (born 1954)

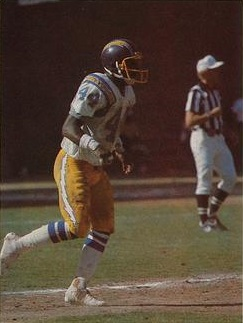
- Shaw c. 1980

No. 44
- Position: Defensive back

Personal information
- Born: August 25, 1954 (age 72); Newark, New Jersey, U.S.
- Listed height: 5 ft 10 in (1.78 m)
- Listed weight: 183 lb (83 kg)

Career information
- High school: Barringer (Newark)
- College: Northwestern
- NFL draft: 1977: 6th round, 152nd overall pick

Career history
- San Diego Chargers (1977–1981); New York Giants (1982–1984)

Awards and highlights
- 2× First-team All-Big Ten (1975, 1976)

Career NFL statistics
- Interceptions: 12
- Fumble recoveries: 2
- Sacks: 1
- Stats at Pro Football Reference

Kenneth Edward "Pete" Shaw (born August 25, 1954) is an American former professional football player who was a safety for eight seasons in the National Football League (NFL) with the San Diego Chargers and the New York Giants. He played college football for the Northwestern Wildcats and was selected in the sixth round of the 1977 NFL draft.

Shaw attended Barringer High School.
