= Joe Devlin (American football) =

American football player (born 1954)

No. 70
- Position: Offensive tackle

Personal information
- Born: February 23, 1954 (age 72); Phoenixville, Pennsylvania, U.S.
- Listed height: 6 ft 5 in (1.96 m)
- Listed weight: 261 lb (118 kg)

Career information
- High school: Great Valley (PA)
- College: Iowa
- NFL draft: 1976: 2nd round, 52nd overall pick

Career history
- Buffalo Bills (1976–1989)

Awards and highlights
- First-team All-Big Ten (1975); Second-team All-Big Ten (1974)

Career NFL statistics
- Games played: 191
- Games started: 179
- Stats at Pro Football Reference

Joseph Devlin (born February 23, 1954) is an American former professional football player who was an offensive tackle in the National Football League (NFL) for the Buffalo Bills in the 1970s and 1980s.

Devlin played college football at the University of Iowa and he is a cousin of former center Mike Devlin. Devlin is a graduate of Great Valley High School and is one of the few professional football players to attend the school, the others being Dan Klecko, Ed Seiwell, and Dan Buchholz, although Seiwell (Houston Oilers, Baltimore Colts) never played in a regular season game.
