= Rod Walters =

American football player (born 1954)

No. 76, 67
- Positions: Guard, offensive tackle

Personal information
- Born: February 27, 1954 (age 72); Lansing, Michigan, U.S.
- Listed height: 6 ft 3 in (1.91 m)
- Listed weight: 258 lb (117 kg)

Career information
- High school: Berkley (MI)
- College: Iowa (1972–1975)
- NFL draft: 1976: 1st round, 14th overall pick

Career history
- Kansas City Chiefs (1976, 1978–1980); Detroit Lions (1980); Miami Dolphins (1980); Chicago Blitz (1984); San Antonio Gunslingers (1985)

Awards and highlights
- First-team All-American (1975); First-team All-Big Ten (1975)

Career NFL statistics
- Games played: 55
- Games started: 7
- Stats at Pro Football Reference

Wayne Roderick Walters II (born February 27, 1954) is an American former professional football player who was an offensive lineman in the National Football League (NFL). He played college football for the Iowa Hawkeyes and was selected 14th overall by the Kansas City Chiefs in the 1976 NFL draft. Walters played with the Chiefs until the middle of the 1980 season. He played for the Detroit Lions and Miami Dolphins for the remainder of that season.
