= Tim Fox (American football) =

American football player (born 1953)

No. 48
- Position: Safety

Personal information
- Born: November 1, 1953 (age 73); Canton, Ohio, U.S.
- Listed height: 5 ft 11 in (1.80 m)
- Listed weight: 186 lb (84 kg)

Career information
- High school: Glenwood (Canton)
- College: Ohio State
- NFL draft: 1976: 1st round, 21st overall pick

Career history
- New England Patriots (1976–1981); San Diego Chargers (1982–1984); Los Angeles Rams (1985–1986)

Awards and highlights
- Pro Bowl (1980); PFWA All-Rookie Team (1976); New England Patriots All-1970s Team; Consensus All-American (1975); First-team All-Big Ten (1975)

Career NFL statistics
- Games played: 141
- Games started: 116
- Interceptions: 26
- Sacks: 1.0
- Stats at Pro Football Reference

Timothy Richard Fox (born November 1, 1953) is an American former professional football player who was a safety in the National Football League (NFL). He played for the New England Patriots, San Diego Chargers and the Los Angeles Rams from 1976 to 1986.

Fox was born in Canton, Ohio, where he played football at Glenwood High School. He played college football for the Ohio State Buckeyes, and was a co-captain his senior year along with the only two time Heisman Trophy winner Archie Griffin under the great coach Woody Hayes. Fox was selected in the first round (21st overall) in the 1976 NFL draft by the Patriots. He was selected to the Pro Bowl in 1980. Fox remained in Foxboro, Massachusetts after he retired in 1987 for 12 years until 1999 when he decided to make Westwood, Massachusetts his new home. Tim currently resides in Hull, Massachusetts and Marco Island, Florida. Fox worked for R.R. Donnelley & Sons and was most recently Sales Director for the New England region prior to his retirement. He and his wife Deborah have two daughters, Haley and Landin, and one son, Christopher, as well as six grandchildren.

In 2016, Fox described himself and his declining cognitive abilities, as "...a living, breathing petri dish for CTE research.”
