= Billy Marek =

American football player

Profile
- Position: Running back

Personal information
- Born: c. 1954 (age 70)
- Listed height: 5 ft 8 in (1.73 m)
- Listed weight: 185 lb (84 kg)

Career information
- College: Wisconsin (1972–1975)

Awards and highlights
- Second-team All-American (1974); 3× First-team All-Big Ten (1973, 1974, 1975)

Billy Marek (born c. 1954) is an American former football running back. He played college football for the University of Wisconsin–Madison from 1972 to 1975.

In his high school football career at St. Rita of Cascia High School in Illinois, Marek was named the MVP (most valuable player) of the 1972 Chicago Prep Bowl, a game in which St. Rita defeated Morgan Park High School.

Playing for the Wisconsin Badgers football team from 1972 to 1975, Marek gained more than 1,200 rushing yards for three consecutive years from 1973 to 1975. He rushed for 740 yards and 13 touchdowns in the final three games of the 1974 season, including a program record 304 rushing yards against Minnesota in the season finale. He also set Wisconsin career records with 3,709 rushing yards and 277 points scored, led the country with 114 points in 1974, and was named the State of Wisconsin's "Sports Personality of the Year" in 1974. He was inducted into the University of Wisconsin Hall of Fame in 1994.

Marek did not have a substantial professional career but did briefly play for the Chicago Fire of the minor league American Football Association in 1981.

== See also ==
- List of NCAA major college football yearly scoring leaders
