= 1977 Michigan Wolverines football team =

American college football season

1977 Michigan Wolverines football

Big Ten co-champion

Rose Bowl, L 20–27 vs. Washington
- Conference: Big Ten Conference

Ranking
- Coaches: No. 8
- AP: No. 9
- Record: 10–2 (7–1 Big Ten)
- Head coach: Bo Schembechler (9th season)
- Defensive coordinator: Bill McCartney (1st season)
- MVP: Russell Davis
- Captains: Walt Downing; Dwight Hicks
- Home stadium: Michigan Stadium

1977 Big Ten Conference football standings
	Conf.					Overall
Team	W		L		T	W		L		T
No. 9 Michigan +	7	–	1	–	0	10	–	2	–	0
No. 11 Ohio State +	7	–	1	–	0	9	–	3	–	0
Michigan State	6	–	1	–	1	7	–	3	–	1
Indiana	4	–	3	–	1	5	–	5	–	1
Minnesota	4	–	4	–	0	7	–	5	–	0
Purdue	3	–	5	–	0	5	–	6	–	0
Iowa	3	–	5	–	0	5	–	6	–	0
Wisconsin	3	–	6	–	0	5	–	6	–	0
Illinois	2	–	6	–	0	3	–	8	–	0
Northwestern	1	–	8	–	0	1	–	10	–	0
+ – Conference co-champions; Rankings from AP Poll

The 1977 Michigan Wolverines football team was an American football team that represented the University of Michigan in the 1977 Big Ten Conference football season. In its ninth year under head coach Bo Schembechler, the team compiled a 10–2 record, tied with Ohio State for the Big Ten Conference championship, and outscored opponents by a total of 353 to 124. The Wolverines were ranked No. 1 in the AP Poll midway through the season but were upset by the unranked Minnesota Golden Gophers. In the final game of the regular season, Michigan beat No. 4 Ohio State but lost to No. 13 Washington in the 1978 Rose Bowl. In the final AP and UPI polls, Michigan was ranked No. 9 and No. 8, respectively.

The team's statistical leaders included quarterback Rick Leach with 1,109 passing yards, fullback Russell Davis with 1,013 rushing yards, wing back Ralph Clayton with 393 receiving yards, and placekicker Gregg Willner with 49 points scored. Davis was selected as the team's most valuable player.

On defense, linebacker Ron Simpkins broke Michigan's single-season record with 158 total tackles (113 solo and 45 assists) during the regular season. He also sacked opposing quarterbacks 10 times and recovered five fumbles in 1977. In the final regular season game of the 1977 season, Simpkins had 20 tackles (15 solo) and recovered a fumble that set up the game-winning touchdown in Michigan's 14–6 victory over Ohio State.

Three Michigan players received first-team honors on the 1977 All-America team: (1) offensive guard Mark Donahue (unanimous); (2) center Walt Downing; and (3) linebacker and punter John Anderson. Fourteen Wolverines received first- or second-team honors on the 1977 All-Big Ten Conference football team.

== Schedule ==
Date	Opponent	Rank	Site	TV	Result	Attendance
September 10	at Illinois	No. 2	Memorial Stadium; Champaign, IL (rivalry)		W 37–9	60,477
September 17	Duke*	No. 1	Michigan Stadium; Ann Arbor, MI		W 21–9	104,072
September 24	Navy*	No. 1	Michigan Stadium; Ann Arbor, MI		W 14–7	101,800
October 1	No. 5 Texas A&M*	No. 3	Michigan Stadium; Ann Arbor, MI	ABC	W 41–3	104,802
October 8	at Michigan State	No. 3	Spartan Stadium; East Lansing, MI (rivalry)		W 24–14	78,183
October 15	No. 14 Wisconsin	No. 1	Michigan Stadium; Ann Arbor, MI		W 56–0	104,892
October 22	at Minnesota	No. 1	Memorial Stadium; Minneapolis, MN (Little Brown Jug)		L 0–16	44,165
October 29	Iowa^{†}	No. 6	Michigan Stadium; Ann Arbor, MI		W 23–6	104,617
November 5	Northwestern	No. 6	Michigan Stadium; Ann Arbor, MI (rivalry)		W 63–20	103,211
November 12	at Purdue	No. 6	Ross–Ade Stadium; West Lafayette, IN		W 40–7	68,003
November 19	No. 4 Ohio State	No. 5	Michigan Stadium; Ann Arbor, MI (The Game)	ABC	W 14–6	106,024
January 2, 1978	vs. No. 13 Washington*	No. 4	Rose Bowl; Pasadena, CA (Rose Bowl)	NBC	L 20–27	105,312
*Non-conference game; ^{†}Homecoming; Rankings from AP Poll released prior to the game

== Season summary ==
=== Preseason ===
The 1976 Michigan Wolverines football team compiled a 10–2 record and was ranked No. 3 in the final AP and UPI polls. Michigan lost several starters from the 1976 team, including running back Rob Lytle, who finished third in the 1976 Heisman voting, flanker Jim Smith, and middle linebacker Calvin O'Neal, a consensus first-team All-American. In the spring of 1977, coach Schembechler publicly questioned whether the 1977 team could be as good as the 1976 team: "How many other teams lost 75 percent of the offense and seven of their 11 defensive starters?" His comment about 75 percent of the offense referred to Rob Lytle and Jim Smith who had a combined total of more than 2,400 rushing and receiving yards.

Key veterans returning from the 1976 team included quarterback Rick Leach and defensive end John Anderson (moved to linebacker in 1977). Another strength was an all-senior offensive line, including guards Mark Donahue and Gerry Szara, center Walt Downing, and tackles Mike Kenn and Bill Dufek. In August 1977, Coach Schembechler paraded the five linemen in front of the press and boasted: "That is probably the best interior line we've had since I've been here. They're all big, they can move and they're smart. They can make adjustments." Dufek sustained a cracked fibula before the season started and was replaced by Jon Giesler.

The 1977 season also saw major changes in the coaching staff. In December 1976, defensive coordinator Gary Moeller was hired as the head coach at Illinois. Less than two weeks later, offensive coordinator and offensive backfield coach Chuck Stobart was hired as head coach at Toledo. Bill McCartney was promoted to take over Moeller's role as defensive coordinator, and Bowling Green head coach Don Nehlen was hired to replace Stobart as the offensive backfield coach.

The 1977 recruiting class included Kurt Becker, Andy Cannavino, B. J. Dickey, Stan Edwards, and Mike Trgovac.

=== Illinois ===
Week 1: Michigan at Illinois

Team	1	2	3	4	Total
• Michigan	13	7	10	7	37
Illinois	3	0	0	6	9

- Date: September 10
- Location: Champaign, IL
- Game attendance: 60,477

Scoring summary
1	ILL	Dave Finzer 42-yard field goal	ILL 3–0
1	MICH	Ralph Clayton 30-yard pass from Rick Leach (Gregg Willner kick)	MICH 7–3
1	MICH	Harlan Huckleby 15-yard run (Willner kick failed)	MICH 13–3
2	MICH	Huckleby 3-yard run (Willner kick)	MICH 20–3
3	MICH	Willner 23-yard field goal	MICH 23–3
3	MICH	Gene Johnson 11-yard pass from Leach (Willner kick)	MICH 30–3
4	MICH	Russell Davis 4-yard run (Willner kick)	MICH 37–3
4	ILL	Clarence Baker 1-yard run (kick failed)	MICH 37–9

On September 10, 1977, Michigan, ranked No. 2 in the AP Poll, defeated Illinois, 37–9, at Memorial Stadium in Champaign, Illinois, in a game matching Michigan coach Bo Schembechler against his former defensive coordinator, Gary Moeller. Moeller left Michigan to become Illinois' head coach in 1977. The game attracted a crowd of 60,477, the largest opening day crowd in Illinois school history.

Michigan dominated the Illini, rushing for 350 yards. Junior quarterback Rick Leach ran an option offense in which he kept the ball for 78 rushing yards and also completed six of 11 passes for 76 yards, including touchdown passes of 30 yards to Ralph Clayton and 11 yards to Gene Johnson. Running back Harlan Huckleby rushed for 128 yards and two touchdowns on 24 carries. Russell Davis added 99 yards and a touchdown on 18 carries. However, the Wolverines turned the ball over four times: a fumble by Huckleby on Michigan's first play from scrimmage, a fumbled punt return by Roosevelt Smith, and interceptions by Leach and backup quarterback John Wangler. The two fumbles set up the two Illini scores.

On defense, Michigan allowing only 48 passing yards and 59 rushing yards on 38 attempts. Defensive back Mike Jolly had both an interception and a fumble recovery.

=== Duke ===
Week 2: Duke at Michigan

Team	1	2	3	4	Total
Duke	0	0	6	3	9
• Michigan	0	14	0	7	21

- Date: September 17
- Location: Ann Arbor, MI
- Game attendance: 104,072

Scoring summary
2	=MICH	Leach 7-yard run (Gregg Willner kick)	MICH 7–0
2	MICH	R. Davis 4-yard run (Gregg Willner kick)	MICH 14–0
3	DUKE	Dunn 3-yard run (run failed)	MICH 14–6
4	DUKE	Walcott 43-yard field goal	MICH 14–9
4	MICH	Leach 7-yard run (Gregg Willner kick)	MICH 21–9

On September 17, 1977, Michigan (ranked #1 in the AP Poll) defeated Duke, 21–9, in front of a crowd of 104,072 at Michigan Stadium. On the opening kickoff, Harlan Huckleby stepped across the goal line to the one-yard line, then stepped back, with the ball being marked down at the one-yard line. From there, Michigan was penalized for being offside and then for delay of game. Michigan did not score in the first quarter, but then scored two touchdowns in the second quarter. Rick Leach rushed for 99 yards and two touchdowns and complete six of 11 passes for 76 yards. Russell Davis also rushed for 95 yards and a touchdown.

=== Navy ===
Week 3: Navy at Michigan

Team	1	2	3	4	Total
Navy	0	0	7	0	7
• Michigan	0	14	0	0	14

- Date: September 24
- Location: Ann Arbor, MI
- Game attendance: 101,877

Scoring summary
2	=MICH	Huckleby 13-yard run (Gregg Willner kick)	MICH 7–0
2	MICH	Huckleby 22-yard run (Gregg Willner kick)	MICH 14–0
3	NAVY	Sandy Jones 34-yard pass from Bob Leszczynski (Tala kick)	MICH 14–7

On September 24, 1977, Michigan defeated Navy, 14–7, at Michigan Stadium. Michigan's points were all scored in the second quarter on runs of 13 and 34 yards by running back Harlan Huckleby. Huckleby rushed for 147 yards, and Russell Davis added 93 more, but Navy outgained Michigan by 301 total yards to 277 total yards. Michigan had defeated Navy by 56 points in 1976, and the seven-point victory in 1977 was considered a disappointment. After the game, Michigan dropped from #1 to #3 in the AP and Coaches' Polls.

=== Texas A&M ===
Week 4: Texas A&M at Michigan

Team	1	2	3	4	Total
Texas A&M	3	0	0	0	3
• Michigan	0	7	13	21	41

- Date: October 1
- Location: Ann Arbor, MI
- Game attendance: 104,802
- TV announcers (ABC): Keith Jackson, Frank Broyles

Scoring summary
1	A&M	Tony Franklin 24-yard field goal	A&M 3–0
2	MICH	Russell Davis 4-yard run (Gregg Willner kick)	MICH 7–3
3	MICH	Russell Davis 1-yard run (run failed)	MICH 13–3
3	MICH	Curt Stephenson 35-yard pass from Rick Leach (Gregg Willner kick)	MICH 20–3
4	MICH	Harlan Huckleby 8-yard run (Gregg Willner kick)	MICH 27–3
4	MICH	Jim Pickens recovered blocked punt in end zone (Gregg Willner kick)	MICH 34–3
4	MICH	Mike Jolly 50-yard interception return (Gregg Willner kick)	MICH 41–3

On October 1, 1977, No. 3 Michigan defeated No. 5 Texas A&M, 41–3, in front of 104,802 spectators at Michigan Stadium. Russell Davis rushed for 110 yards and two touchdowns, and Harlan Huckleby added 73 yards and a touchdown. Rick Leach also threw a 35-yard touchdown pass to Curt Stephenson. On defense, Ron Simpkins had 14 tackles, recovered a fumble, and blocked a punt that Jim Pickens recovered in the end zone for a touchdown. Mike Jolly also returned an interception 50 yards for a touchdown. After "skimpy victories" over Duke and Navy, the trouncing of the highly rated Aggies was considered "one of [Michigan's] most stunning performances in recent years. Columnist Joe Falls wrote: "It may have been Bo Schembechler's finest coaching job in his nine years at Michigan." Texas A&M coach Emory Bellard said, "Michigan came out in the second half and beat us every way you can beat a football team. . . . Michigan is an outstanding team."

=== Michigan State ===
Week 5: Michigan at Michigan State

Team	1	2	3	4	Total
• Michigan	0	10	14	0	24
Michigan St	0	7	0	7	14

- Date: October 8
- Location: East Lansing, MI
- Game attendance: 78,183

Scoring summary
Q2	MSU	Gibson 19 yard pass from Smith (Nielsen kick)	MSU 7–0
Q2	MICH	White 12 yard pass from Leach (Willner kick)	Tie 7–7
Q2	MICH	Willner 50 yard field goal	MICH 10–7
Q3	MICH	R. Davis 3 yard run (Willner kick)	MICH 17–7
Q3	MICH	Leach 3 yard run (Willner kick)	MICH 24–7
Q4	MSU	Earley 11 yard run (Nielsen kick)	MICH 24–14

On October 8, 1977, Michigan defeated Michigan State, 24–14, at Spartan Stadium. Michigan State took a 7–0 lead on a 19-yard touchdown pass from Ed Smith to Kirk Gibson. Michigan responded with a 12-yard touchdown pass from Rick Leach to White and a 50-yard field goal to take a 10–7 lead at halftime. Michigan extended its lead to 24–7 in the third quarter on touchdown runs by Russell Davis and Ed Leach. Harlan Huckleby rushed for 146 yards, and Russell Davis added 96 yards. Ralph Clayton caught three passes for 99 yards. Michigan completed four of 10 passes in the game and threw only one pass in the second half.

=== Wisconsin ===
Week 6: Wisconsin at Michigan

Team	1	2	3	4	Total
Wisconsin	0	0	0	0	0
• Michigan	7	14	14	21	56

- Date: October 15
- Location: Ann Arbor, MI
- Game attendance: 104,892

Scoring summary
Q1	MICH	Marsh 7 yard pass from Leach (Willner kick)	MICH 7–0
Q2	MICH	Leach 2 yard run (Willner kick)	MICH 14–0
Q2	MICH	R. Smith 2 yard run (Willner kick)	MICH 21–0
Q3	MICH	G. Johnson 22 yard pass from Leach (Willner kick)	MICH 28–0
Q3	MICH	R. Davis 37 yard run (Labun kick)	MICH 35–0
Q4	MICH	R. Smith 2 yard run (Labun kick)	MICH 42–0
Q4	MICH	Edwards 3 yard run (Labun kick)	MICH 49–0
Q4	MICH	Dickey 2 yard run (Labun kick)	MICH 56–0

On October 15, 1977, #1 Michigan defeated undefeated and #14 Wisconsin, 56–0, in front of 104,892 spectators at Michigan Stadium. Rick Leach rushed for 32 yards and a touchdown and completed 10 of 16 passes for 127 yards and touchdown passes to Doug Marsh and Gene Johnson. Roosevelt Smith rushed for 157 yards and two touchdowns, and Russell Davis rushed for 105 yards and a touchdown. Stanley Edwards and B. J. Dickey also scored rushing touchdowns. After the game, Michigan coach Bo Schembechler said, "We played this one as a big game and it turned out that way."

=== Minnesota ===
Week 7: Michigan at Minnesota

Team	1	2	3	4	Total
Michigan	0	0	0	0	0
• Minnesota	10	3	0	3	16

- Date: October 22
- Location: Minneapolis
- Game attendance: 44,165

Scoring summary
1	Minn	Paul Rogind 41-yard field goal	Minnesota 3–0
1	Minn	Marion Barber, Jr 3-yard run (Rogind kick)	Minnesota 10–0
2	Minn	Rogind 37-yard field goal	Minnesota 13–0
4	Minn	Rogind 32-yard field goal	Minnesota 16–0

On October 22, 1977, #1 Michigan lost to unranked Minnesota, 16–0, at Memorial Stadium, Minneapolis. All 16 of Minnesota points were scored by Paul Rogind (three field goals and an extra point) and Marion Barber, Jr. (three-yard touchdown run). Both Rogind and Barber were from the State of Michigan—Rogind from Farmington, Michigan and Barber from Detroit. Michigan's offense was shut out for the first time in 112 games dating back to 1967. After the game, Minnesota's players swarmed across the field to reclaim the Little Brown Jug trophy that had been in Michigan's custody for a decade. After the game the Detroit Free Press wrote: "In one fell swoop, Minnesota took away Michigan's No. 1 rating, its undefeated season, and, oh yes, that little chunk of pottery known as the Little Brown Jug."

=== Iowa ===
Week 8: Iowa at Michigan

Team	1	2	3	4	Total
Iowa	0	0	0	6	6
• Michigan	7	7	7	2	23

- Date: October 29
- Location: Ann Arbor, MI
- Game attendance: 104,617

Scoring summary
1	MICH	R. Davis 63-yard pass from Leach (Willner kick)	Michigan 7–0
2	MICH	G. Johnson 6-yard pass from Leach (Willner kick)	Michigan 14–0
3	MICH	White 32-yard pass from Leach (Willner kick)	Michigan 21–0
4	IOWA	McLaughlin 1-yard run (run failed)	Michigan 21–6
4	MICH	Safety, McLaughlin tackled in end zone	Michigan 23–6

On October 29, 1977, Michigan, ranked #6 after losing to Minnesota, defeated Iowa, 23–6, before a crowd of 104,617 at the annual homecoming game at Michigan Stadium. Rick Leach completed nine of 12 passes for 202 yards, including touchdown passes covering 63 yards to Russell Davis, six yards to Gene Johnson, and 32 yards to Rick White. Leach's three touchdown passes gave him 25 for his career, breaking the record of 23 set by Bob Chappuis in the 1940s. Michigan also scored on a safety in the fourth quarter when linebacker Dom Tedesco tackled Iowa's quarterback in the end zone. After the game, Bo Schembechler said, "That was a devastating defeat a week ago. No one will ever know how hard it was to come back from that game."

=== Northwestern ===
Week 9: Northwestern at Michigan

Team	1	2	3	4	Total
Northwestern	7	0	0	13	20
• Michigan	0	14	28	21	63

- Date: November 5
- Location: Ann Arbor, MI
- Game attendance: 103,211

Scoring summary
1	NW	Stranski 1 yard run (Poulos kick)	Northwestern 7–0
2	MICH	Huckleby 4 yard run (Willner kick)	Tie 7–7
2	MICH	G. Johnson recovered fumble in end zone (Willner kick)	Michigan 14–7
3	MICH	Leach 21 yard run (Willner kick)	Michigan 21–7
3	MICH	Leach 4 yard run (Willner kick)	Michigan 28–7
3	MICH	Edwards 26 yard pass from Leach (Willner kick)	Michigan 35–7
3	MICH	Clayton 41 yard pass from Leach (Willner kick)	Michigan 42–7
4	MICH	Reid 19 yard run (Willner kick)	Michigan 49–7
4	NW	Sheets 28 yard pass from Stranski (Poulos kick)	Michigan 49–14
4	MICH	M. Smith 15 yard run (Willner kick)	Michigan 56–14
4	MICH	Mitchell 34 yard pass from Wangler (Willner kick)	Michigan 63–14
4	NW	Bailey 7 yard pass from Stranski (pass failed)	Michigan 63–20

On November 5, 1977, Michigan defeated Northwestern, 63–20, at Michigan Stadium. In the lopsided victory, 77 Michigan players had an opportunity to play in the game. Rick Leach ran for two touchdowns, passed for two more (one to Stanley Edwards, the other to Ralph Clayton), and set a new Michigan's record with 2,664 career passing yards. Late in the game, John Wangler threw a touchdown pass to Alan Mitchell. Michigan totaled 511 yards of total offense.

=== Purdue ===
Week 10: Michigan at Purdue

Team	1	2	3	4	Total
• Michigan	3	14	21	2	40
Purdue	7	0	0	0	7

- Date: November 12
- Location: West Lafayette, IN

Scoring summary
1		PUR	Dave Young 6-yard pass from Mark Herrmann (Scott Sovereen kick)	PUR 7–0
1		MICH	Gregg Willner 28-yard field goal	PUR 7–3
2		MICH	Mark Schmerge 8-yard pass from Rick Leach (Gregg Willner kick)	MICH 10–7
2		MICH	Roosevelt Smith 2-yard run (Willner kick)	MICH 17–7
3		MICH	Russell Davis 2-yard run (Gregg Willner kick)	MICH 24–7
3		MICH	Dom Tedesco 30-yard interception return (Willner kick)	MICH 31–7
3	0:50	MICH	Schmerge 6-yard pass from Leach (Willner kick)	MICH 38–7
4		MICH	Safety, Herrmann tackled in end zone	MICH 40–7

On November 12, 1977, Michigan defeated Purdue, 40–7, before a crowd of 68,003 at Ross–Ade Stadium in West Lafayette, Indiana. One year earlier, Purdue had upset Michigan by a 16–14 score, knocking Michigan out of the No. 1 ranking. Adding to the anticipation, the game matched coach Schembechler against his longtime defensive coordinator, Jim Young, who took over as Purdue's head coach in 1977.

Purdue's freshman quarterback Mark Herrmann led the Boilermakers on a 55-yard, seven-play opening drive capped by a six-yard touchdown pass to Dave Young. Defensive back Dwight Hicks set up Michigan's first score when he intercepted Hermann's pass at Purdue's 18-yard line with five minutes remaining in the first quarter. Michigan settled for a field goal, and Purdue held a 7–3 lead at the end of the first quarter. In the second quarter, Michigan quarterback Rick Leach led the Wolverines on a 60-yard, eight-minute drive capped by an eight-yard touchdown pass to Mark Schmerge. With less than a minute remaining in the second quarter, Michigan forced a fumble on a punt, which was recovered by Curt Stephenson at the two-yard line. Roosevelt Smith scored on the next play, and Michigan took a 17–7 lead at halftime.

Michigan back Russell Davis, playing in place of an injured Harlan Huckleby, rushed for 127 yards in the third quarter (168 in the game), including a 24-yard touchdown run. Michigan extended its lead to 31–7 when Dom Tedesco intercepted a Hermann pass and returned it for a touchdown. With 50 seconds left in the third quarter, Michigan scored again on a second touchdown pass from Leach to Schmerge. Michigan concluded the scoring in the fourth quarter when Tom Seabron sacked Hermann in the end zone for a safety.

After Purdue's opening drive, Michigan's defense held Purdue scoreless for the remainder of the game. Linebacker Ron Simpkins led the defense with 10 tackles, and the Wolverines also limited Hermann to 74 passing yards with three interceptions.

=== Ohio State ===
Week 11: Ohio State at Michigan

Team	1	2	3	4	Total
Ohio State	3	0	3	0	6
• Michigan	0	7	7	0	14

- Date: November 19
- Location: Ann Arbor, MI
- Game attendance: 106,024
- TV announcers (ABC): Keith Jackson, Ara Parseghian

Scoring summary
1	OHIO	Vlade Janakievski 29-yard field goal	OHIO 3–0
2	MICH	Roosevelt Smith 1-yard run (Gregg Willner kick)	MICH 7–3
3	MICH	Rick Leach 2-yard run (Willner kick)	MICH 14–3
3	OHIO	Janakievski 44-yard field goal	MICH 14–6

On November 19, 1977, Michigan, ranked No. 5 in both polls, defeated No. 4 Ohio State, 14–6, at Michigan Stadium. The game was broadcast to a national television audience on ABC, and the crowd of 106,024 at the stadium was the largest ever to attend a regular-season college football game. The opening minutes were preempted by the arrival of Egyptian President Anwar Sadat on his historic visit to Israel, causing an angry reaction in Ann Arbor bars where hundreds had gathered to watch the game.

For the second consecutive year, Michigan's defense prevented Ohio State from scoring a touchdown. Ohio State had the momentum in the first quarter, taking a 3–0 lead on a Vlade Janakievski field goal and limiting Michigan to five plays and five yards. A second Janakievski field goal attempt in the opening quarter went wide to the right. In the second quarter, quarterback Rick Leach led the Wolverines on a 50-yard drive, but a 42-yard field goal attempt by Gregg Willner fell short. On the next possession, Leach again led the Wolverines down the field, and this time the drive ended with a one-yard touchdown run by Roosevelt Smith. Michigan led, 7–3, at halftime.

In the third quarter, Michigan linebacker Ron Simpkins recovered a Ron Springs fumble at Ohio State's 20-yard line. Leach then scored on a two-yard run. Willner converted the extra point kick, and Michigan led, 14–3. On the next drive, Ohio State quarterback Rod Gerald led a 74-yard drive to Michigan's 11-yard line, but the Buckeyes lost yardage on the next three plays, including a sack by Simpkins. Ohio State settled for a field goal by Janakievski. Ohio State moved deep into Michigan territory on two additional drives. On the first, the defense stopped Ohio State fullback Paul Campbell on a fourth-and-one run at the 10-yard line. On the other, Ohio State drove more than 90 yards and had a first down at Michigan's eight-yard line. On the next play, Gerald was hit in the backfield by linebacker John Anderson and fumbled, with Derek Howard recovering the ball for Michigan.

In a battle of two great defenses, Ohio State out-gained Michigan by 352 yards to 196. Michigan managed only 10 first downs to 23 for Ohio State. After the game, coach Schembechler praised his defense: "Our defense was terrific. They came up with big plays when we had to have them." Ohio State coach Woody Hayes said: "This is by far the best game we ever played and lost. Their defense should receive great, great credit, for they stopped us when we were in scoring position."

The game was marred by controversy when 64-year-old coach Hayes punched ABC's sideline cameraman in the stomach. Hayes was angered when the cameraman focused on Hayes after his quarterback's fourth quarter fumble. Asked about the incident in a post-game press conference, Hayes "went into a mini-rage", balled his fist in front of the reporter and said: "They stick it in your face every damn time." Two days later, Hayes apologized for the incident, but at the same time called the cameraman "a liar" and said he was "so damned tired of hearing what I did to that man out there."

=== Rose Bowl ===
Rose Bowl: Michigan vs. Washington

Team	1	2	3	4	Total
Michigan	0	0	7	13	20
• Washington	7	10	10	0	27

- Date: January 2
- Location: Pasadena, CA
- Game attendance: 105,312
- TV announcers (NBC): Curt Gowdy, John Brodie

Scoring summary
Q1	6:37	UW	Warren Moon 2-yard run (Steve Robbins kick)	UW 7–0
Q2	10:33	UW	Robbins 30-yard field goal	UW 10–0
Q2	3:26	UW	Moon 1-yard run (Robbins kick)	UW 17–0
Q3	12:21	UW	Spider Gaines 28-yard pass from Moon (Robbins kick)	UW 24–0
Q3	4:31	MICH	Curt Stephenson 76-yard pass from Rick Leach (Gregg Willner kick)	UW 24–7
Q3	0:50	UW	Robbins 26-yard field goal	UW 27–7
Q4	11:21	MICH	Russell Davis 2-yard run (Willner kick)	UW 27–14
Q4	3:44	MICH	Stan Edwards 32-yard pass from Leach (kick missed)	UW 27–20

On January 2, 1978, Michigan lost to Washington, 27–20, in the 1978 Rose Bowl. Michigan entered the game ranked No. 4 by the AP and favored by two touchdowns against No. 13 Washington. With the loss, Michigan coach Schembechler had a record of 0–8–1 in the final games of his nine seasons at Michigan.

Washington dominated early, taking a 17–0 lead at halftime. Washington quarterback Warren Moon scored on two rushing touchdowns, and Steve Robbins kicked a 30-yard field goal. Washington was aided in the first quarter when Michigan punter John Anderson dropped to one knee to field an errant snap, giving Washington excellent field position. In another first half mishap, Michigan drove to Washington's 31-yard line but turned the ball over on a Russell Davis fumble. With two minutes remaining the first half, Washington coach Don James called for a fake punt on fourth-and-seven from the Huskies' 33-yard line. Washington's freshman punter Aaron Wilson completed a pass from punt formation that resulted in a 46-yard gain.

At the start of the third quarter, Michigan's Mike Jolly intercepted a Moon pass deep in Washington territory. On fourth down inside the five-yard line, Roosevelt Smith's run was stopped short of the line to gain. After the goal-line stand, Moon led the Huskies on a 97-yard touchdown drive ending with a 28-yard touchdown pass from Moon to Spider Gaines. The Huskies led, 24–0.

In the final 20 minutes of the game, Michigan turned to a passing game and scored three touchdowns. With less than five minutes remaining in the third quarter, Rick Leach threw 23 yards to Curt Stephenson who ran untouched the remaining 53 yards into the end zone. Leach's 76-yard completion to Stephenson was the longest pass play in Rose bowl history to that point. Michigan next scored on touchdown runs by Russell Davis and Stan Edwards.

With 95 seconds left in the game, Michigan had the ball at Washington's 19-yard line when Ralph Clayton dropped Leach's pass in the end zone. Leach then hit Stan Edwards with a pass at the six-yard line, but the ball bounced off Edwards' hands and helmet and was intercepted by Washington linebacker Michael Jackson. Michigan's defense then held on three plays and forced Washington to punt from its end zone. On the final drive of the game, Leach threw into the end zone again, but the pass was intercepted by Washington back Nesby Glasgow.

=== Award season ===
Five Michigan players received honors on the 1977 All-America team:

- Offensive tackle Mark Donahue was a unanimous selection, receiving first-team honors from the American Football Coaches Association, the Associated Press, the Football Writers Association of America, the United Press International, Football News, the Newspaper Enterprise Association, The Sporting News, and the Walter Camp Football Foundation.
- Center Walt Downing received first-team honors from the American Football Coaches Association, Football News, and The Sporting News, and second-team honors from the Newspaper Enterprise Association.
- Linebacker John Anderson received first-team honors from the Football Writers Association of America and second-team honors from the United Press International.
- Offensive tackle Mike Kenn received second-team honors from the Associated Press.
- Defensive back Dwight Hicks also received second-team honors from the Associated Press.

Fourteen Michigan players received recognition from the Associated Press (selected by sports writers and broadcasters) and/or United Press International (selected by the Big Ten coaches) on the 1977 All-Big Ten Conference football team: Mark Donahue at guard (AP-1, UPI-1), Dwight Hicks at defensive back (AP-1, UPI-1), Rick Leach at quarterback (AP-1, UPI-2), Mike Kenn at offensive tackle (AP-1, UPI-2), Walt Downing at center (AP-1), John Anderson at defensive end (AP-2, UPI-1) and punter (AP-2, UPI-2), Ron Simpkins at linebacker (AP-2, UPI-1), Jim Pickens at defensive back (AP-2, UPI-1), Russell Davis at running back (AP-2, UPI-2), Harlan Huckleby at running back (UPI-2), Steve Graves at middle guard (UPI-2), Derek Howard at defensive back (UPI-2), Gene Johnson at tight end (AP-2), and Dom Tedesco at linebacker (AP-2).

Team awards were presented as follows:

- Most Valuable Player: Russell Davis
- Meyer Morton Award: John Anderson
- Frederick Matthei Award: Jerry Meter
- Arthur Robinson Scholarship Award: John Anderson
- John Maulbetsch Award: Ron Simpkins

== Personnel ==
=== Full roster ===
1977 Michigan Wolverines football team roster
Players
Coaches
Offense

Pos.	#	Name	Class
G	64	John Arbeznik	Jr
G	61	Greg Bartnick	Jr
G	65	Kurt Becker	Fr
QB	12	Roger Bettis	Sr
QB	8	Jim Breaugh	Fr
FB	33	Russell Davis	Jr
QB	10	B. J. Dickey	Fr
TB	29	Gerald Diggs	So
G	60	Mark Donahue	Sr
C	72	Walt Downing	Sr
OT	73	Bill Dufek	Sr
RB	32	Stanley Edwards	Fr
OT	51	Jon Giesler	Jr
RB	25	Harlan Huckleby	Jr
TE	88	Gene Johnson	Sr
QB	9	Stacy Johnson	Jr
OT	51	Dave Kadela	Jr
OT	78	Mike Kenn	Sr
FB	36	Kevin King	Sr
QB	7	Rick Leach	Jr
C	59	George Lilja	So
TE	80	Doug Marsh	Jr
WR	30	Alan Mitchell	Fr
OT	67	John Powers	So
FB	23	Lawrence Reid	So
WB	43	Max Richardson	Sr
TE	82	Mark Schmerge	Jr
TB	44	Mike Smith	Sr
WR	85	Curt Stephenson	Sr
G	69	Gerry Szara	Sr

Defense

Pos.	#	Name	Class
LB P	86	John Anderson	Sr
W	42	Gene Bell	So
DB	28	Mark Braman	Jr
S	45	Woody Brown	Sr
LB	41	Andy Cannavino	Fr
LB	92	Mark DeSantis	Jr
DT	90	Chris Godfrey	So
MG	54	Steve Graves	Sr
DT	95	Curtis Greer	Jr
DB	4	Mike Harden	So
ILS	83	Dave Harding	Sr
W	17	Dwight Hicks	Sr
LB	94	Robert Holloway	Jr
CB	10	Derek Howard	Sr
DT	93	William Jackson	Sr
DB	20	Raymond Johnson	Sr
DB	16	Mike Jolly	So
DT	55	Dave Keitz	Jr
MG	38	Thomas Melita	Jr
LB	46	Jerry Meter	Jr
LB	53	Mel Owens	So
W	24	Robert Patek	Sr
S	18	Jim Pickens	Sr
LB	91	Tom Seabron	Jr
LB	40	Ron Simpkins	So
LB	99	Dominic Tedesco	Sr
MG	77	Mike Trgovac	Fr

Special teams

Pos.	#	Name	Class
K	3	Nick Labun	Sr
K	99	Bryan Virgil	So
K	1	Greg Willner	Jr

Head coach

- Bo Schembechler

Coordinators/assistant coaches

Bill McCartney (defensive coordinator)
Dennis Brown (defensive ends)
Jack Harbaugh (defensive backs)
Tom Reed (defensive line)
Jerry Hanlon (offensive line)
Paul Schudel (offensive interior line)
Tirrel Burton (offensive ends)
Don Nehlen (offensive backfield)

Legend

- (C) Team captain
- (S) Suspended
- (I) Ineligible
- Injured
- Redshirt

Roster

=== Offense ===
- John Arbeznik, offensive guard, junior, University Heights, Ohio - started 1 game at right offensive guard
- Greg Bartnick, offensive guard, junior, Detroit, Michigan - started 2 games at right offensive guard
- Kurt Becker, offensive tackle, freshman, Aurora, Illinois
- Roger Bettis, quarterback, senior, Minerva, Ohio
- Jim Breaugh, quarterback, freshman, West Bloomfield, M wing back, sophomore, Detroit, Michigan - started 8 games at wing back
- Ralph Clayton, wing back, sophomore, Detroit - started eight games at wing back
- Russell Davis, fullback, junior, Woodbridge, Virginia - started all 12 games at fullback
- B. J. Dickey, quarterback, freshman, Ottawa, Ohio
- Gerald Diggs, tailback, sophomore, Chicago, Illinois
- Mark Donahue, offensive guard, senior, Oak Lawn, Illinois - started all 12 games at left offensive guard
- Walt Downing, center, senior, Coatesville, Pennsylvania - started all 12 games at center
- Bill Dufek, offensive tackle, senior, East Grand Rapids, Michigan
- Stanley Edwards, tailback, freshman, Detroit, Michigan
- Jon Giesler, offensive tackle, junior, Woodville, Ohio - started 1 game at left offensive tackle, 1 game at right offensive tackle
- Harlan Huckleby, tailback, junior, Detroit, Michigan - started all 12 games at tailback
- Gene Johnson, tight end, junior, Flint, Michigan - started 9 games at tight end
- Stacy Johnson, quarterback, junior, Camden, New Jersey
- Dave Kadela, offensive tackle, junior, Dearborn, Michigan
- Mike Kenn, offensive tackle, senior, Evanston, Illinois - started 11 games at left offensive tackle
- Kevin King, fullback, senior, Oak Lawn, Illinois
- Rick Leach, quarterback, junior, Flint, Michigan - started all 12 games at quarterback
- George Lilja, center, sophomore, Palos Park, Illinois
- Doug Marsh, tight end, junior, Akron, Ohio
- Alan Mitchell, wide receiver, freshman, Detroit, Michigan
- John J. Powers, offensive tackle, sophomore, Oak Park, Illinois - started 10 games at right offensive tackle
- Lawrence P. Reid, fullback, sophomore, Philadelphia, Pennsylvania
- Max Richardson, wing back, senior, Fort Wayne, Indiana - started 4 games at wing back
- Mark Schmerge, tight end, junior, Cincinnati, Ohio - started 1 game at tight end
- Mike Smith, tailback, senior, Kalamazoo, Michigan
- Rickey Blake, tailback, sophomore, Chicago, Illinois
- Curt Stephenson, wide receiver, senior, La Jolla, California
- Gerry Szara, offensive guard, senior, Oak Lawn, Illinois - started 9 games at right guard
- Richard White, wide receiver, senior, Cincinnati, Ohio - started all 12 games at wide receiver

=== Defense ===
- John Anderson, defensive end, punter, senior, Waukesha, Wisconsin - started all 12 games at outside linebacker
- Gene Bell, wolf, sophomore, East Liverpool, Ohio
- Mark Braman, defensive halfback, junior, Midland, Michigan
- Woody Brown, safety, senior, East Detroit, Michigan
- Andy Cannavino, inside linebacker, freshman, Cleveland, Ohio
- Mark DeSantis, outside linebacker, junior, Harper Woods, Michigan
- Chris Godfrey, defensive tackle, sophomore, Detroit, Michigan - started 5 games at defensive tackle
- Steve Graves, middle guard, senior, Cleveland, Ohio - started all 12 games at middle guard
- Curtis Greer, defensive tackle, junior, Detroit, Michigan - started 9 games at defensive tackle
- Mike Harden, defensive halfback, sophomore, Detroit, Michigan - started 1 game at weak-side cornerback, 1 game at safety
- Dave Harding, ILS, senior, Northville, Michigan
- Dwight Hicks, wolf, senior, Pennsauken, New Jersey - started 11 games at wolfman
- Robert K. Holloway, outside linebacker, junior, West Bloomfield, Michigan
- Derek Howard, wolf, senior, Hamilton, Ohio - started all 12 games (10 at strong-side cornerback, 1 at wolfman, 1 at safety)
- William Jackson, defensive tackle, junior, Richmond, Virginia - started 1 game at defensive tackle
- Raymond J. Johnson, defensive halfback, senior, Gary, Indiana
- Mike Jolly, defensive halfback, sophomore, Melvindale, Michigan - started 11 games at weak-side cornerback
- Dale Keitz, defensive tackle, junior, Columbus, Ohio - started 9 games at defensive tackle
- Thomas A. Melita, middle guard, junior, Penns Grove, New Jersey
- Jerry Meter, inside linebacker, junior, Birmingham, Michigan - started all 12 games at inside linebacker
- Mel Owens, inside linebacker, sophomore, DeKalb, Illinois - started 1 game at inside linebacker
- Robert M. Patek, wolf, junior, Farmington Hills, Michigan
- Jim Pickens, defensive halfback, senior, Sylvania, Ohio - started all 12 games (10 at safety, 2 at strong-side cornerback)
- Tom Seabron, outside linebacker, junior, Detroit, Michigan
- Ron Simpkins, inside linebacker, sophomore, Detroit, Michigan - started 11 games at inside linebacker
- Dominic Tedesco, outside linebacker, senior, Riverside, Illinois - started all 12 games at outside linebacker
- Mike Trgovac, middle guard, freshman, Austintown, Ohio

=== Kickers ===
- Nick Labun, place-kicker, senior, Rockford, Illinois
- Bryan Virgil, place-kicker, sophomore, Buchanan, Michigan
- Gregg Willner, place-kicker, junior, Miami Beach, Florida

=== Coaching staff ===
- Head coach: Bo Schembechler
- Assistant coaches:

- Bill McCartney - defensive coordinator
- Dennis Brown - defensive ends coach
- Jack Harbaugh - defensive backs coach
- Tom Reed - defensive line coach
- Jerry Hanlon - offensive line coach
- Paul Schudel - offensive interior line coach
- Tirrel Burton - offensive ends coach
- Don Nehlen - offensive backfield coach

- Graduate assistants - Bob Thornbladh, Barry Pierson, Tim Davis, and Jerry Zuver

=== Other personnel ===
- Athletic director: Don Canham
- Trainer: Lindsy McLean
- Manager: Donald G. Di Paolo
- Stadium announcer: Howard King
- Radio play-by-play announcer: Bob Ufer (WJR)

== Statistics ==
=== Offensive statistics ===
==== Rushing ====
Player	Att	Net Yards	Yds/Att	TD
Russell Davis	207	1,013	4.9	7
Harlan Huckleby	160	743	4.6	6
Rick Leach	106	370	3.5	7
Roosevelt Smith	57	308	5.4	4
Stan Edwards	33	152	4.6	1

==== Passing ====
Player	Att	Comp	Int	Comp %	Yds	Yds/Comp	TD
Rick Leach	147	76	7	51.7	1,109	14.6	13
John Wangler	2	1	1	50.0	33	33.0	1
B. J. Dickey	3	1	33.3	−3.0	−3.0	0	

==== Receiving ====
Player	Recp	Yds	Yds/Recp	TD
Ralph Clayton	19	393	20.7	2
Gene Johnson	13	187	14.4	3
Russell Davis	12	148	12.3	1
Harlan Huckleby	12	104	8.7	0

=== Special teams statistics ===
==== Returns ====
Player	Kickoff returns	Yds	Yds/Rtrn	TD	Punt returns	Yds	Yds/Rtrn	TD
Dwight Hicks	0	0	-	0	16	161	10.1	0
Ralph Clayton	7	137	19.6	0	0	0	-	0
Mike Harden	3	49	16.3	0	14	86	6.1	0
Harlan Huckleby	4	90	22.5	0	0	0	-	0
Roosevelt Smith	4	80	20.0	0	0	0	-	0
Stan Edwards	2	86	43.0	0	0	0	-	0
Mike Jolly	0	0	-	0	3	28	9.3	0

==== Kicking ====
Player	PATA	PATM	Percent	FGA	FGM	Percent	Punts	Punt Yds	Avg	Points
Gregg Willner	41	40	97.6	12	3	25.0	0	0	-	49
Nick LaBun	4	4	100.0	0	0	-	0	0	-	4
John Anderson	0	0	-	0	0	-	52	2,099	40.4	0
