= 1975 Michigan Wolverines football team =

American college football season

1975 Michigan Wolverines football

Orange Bowl, L 6–14 vs. Oklahoma
- Conference: Big Ten Conference

Ranking
- Coaches: No. 8
- AP: No. 8
- Record: 8–2–2 (7–1 Big Ten)
- Head coach: Bo Schembechler (7th season)
- Defensive coordinator: Gary Moeller (3rd season)
- MVP: Gordon Bell
- Captains: Don Dufek; Kirk Lewis
- Home stadium: Michigan Stadium

1975 Big Ten Conference football standings
	Conf.					Overall
Team	W		L		T	W		L		T
No. 4 Ohio State $	8	–	0	–	0	11	–	1	–	0
No. 8 Michigan	7	–	1	–	0	8	–	2	–	2
Michigan State	4	–	4	–	0	7	–	4	–	0
Illinois	4	–	4	–	0	5	–	6	–	0
Purdue	4	–	4	–	0	4	–	7	–	0
Wisconsin	3	–	4	–	1	4	–	6	–	1
Minnesota	3	–	5	–	0	6	–	5	–	0
Iowa	3	–	5	–	0	3	–	8	–	0
Northwestern	2	–	6	–	0	3	–	8	–	0
Indiana	1	–	6	–	1	2	–	8	–	1
$ – Conference champion; Rankings from AP Poll

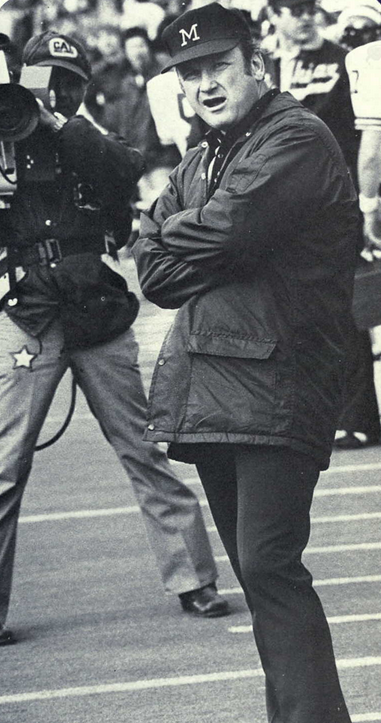
Bo Schembechler in 1975

The 1975 Michigan Wolverines football team was an American football team that represented the University of Michigan in the 1975 Big Ten Conference football season. In it seventh season under head coach Bo Schembechler, Michigan compiled an 8–2–2 record (7–1 against conference opponents), outscored all opponents by a total of 324 to 130, and was ranked No. 8 in the final AP and UPI polls.

Michigan was ranked No. 2 in the preseason AP poll and won its opening game against Wisconsin. After playing consecutive tie games with unranked Stanford and Baylor teams, Michigan dropped to No. 12 in the AP poll. Michigan then won seven straight games, including a convincing victory over No. 5 Missouri and rivalry games against No. 15 Michigan State and a talented Minnesota squad led by quarterback Tony Dungy. In the final game of the regular season, Michigan was ranked No. 4 and lost a close game against No. 1 Ohio State. The Wolverines were invited to play in the 1976 Orange Bowl where they lost a close game against 1975 national champion Oklahoma.

Tailback Gordon Bell led the team in rushing (1,390 yards) and scoring (84 points) and received the team's most valuable player award. The team's other statistical leaders included quarterback Rick Leach with 680 passing yards and split end Jim Smith with 553 receiving yards. Defensive back Don Dufek was selected as a first-team All-American, and ten Michigan players received first- or second-team honors on the 1975 All-Big Ten Conference football team.

== Schedule ==
Date	Time	Opponent	Rank	Site	TV	Result	Attendance
September 13		at Wisconsin	No. 2	Camp Randall Stadium; Madison, WI		W 23–6	79,022
September 20	1:30 p.m.	Stanford*	No. 2	Michigan Stadium; Ann Arbor, MI		T 19–19	92,304
September 27	1:30 p.m.	Baylor*	No. 9	Michigan Stadium; Ann Arbor, MI		T 14–14	104,248
October 4	1:30 p.m.	No. 5 Missouri*	No. 12	Michigan Stadium; Ann Arbor, MI		W 31–7	104,578
October 11	12:30 p.m.	at No. 15 Michigan State	No. 8	Spartan Stadium; East Lansing, MI (rivalry)	ABC	W 16–6	79,776
October 18	1:30 p.m.	Northwestern	No. 7	Michigan Stadium; Ann Arbor, MI (rivalry)		W 69–0	86,201
October 25	1:30 p.m.	Indiana^{†}	No. 7	Michigan Stadium; Ann Arbor, MI		W 55–7	93,857
November 1		at Minnesota	No. 7	Memorial Stadium; Minneapolis, MN (Little Brown Jug)		W 28–21	33,191
November 8	1:30 p.m.	Purdue	No. 6	Michigan Stadium; Ann Arbor, MI		W 28–0	102,415
November 15		at Illinois	No. 4	Memorial Stadium; Champaign, IL (rivalry)		W 21–15	45,077
November 22	12:30 p.m.	No. 1 Ohio State	No. 4	Michigan Stadium; Ann Arbor, MI (The Game)	ABC	L 14–21	105,543
January 1, 1976	7:45 p.m.	vs. No. 3 Oklahoma*	No. 5	Miami Orange Bowl; Miami, FL (Orange Bowl)	NBC	L 6–14	76,799
*Non-conference game; ^{†}Homecoming; Rankings from AP Poll released prior to the game; All times are in Eastern time

== Season summary ==
=== Preseason ===
The 1974 Michigan Wolverines football team compiled a 10–1 record and was ranked No. 3 in the final AP poll. Several key starters returned for the 1975 season, including running backs Gordon Brown (1,048 yards in 1974) and Rob Lytle (802 yards in 1974), defensive back Don Dufek, defensive end Dan Jilek, and middle guard Tim Davis.

Key departures from the 1974 team included defensive back Dave Brown (a consensus All-American), Dennis Franklin (a three-year starter at quarterback), linebacker Steve Strinko (selected as the most valuable player on the 1974 team), center Dennis Franks, fullback Gil Chapman, and wingback Chuck Heater.

Mark Elzinga had been groomed as Franklin's replacement at quarterback, but his performance left doubts. After preseason practice, Rick Leach, a true freshman from Flint was selected as the starting quarterback.

Michigan's 1975 recruiting class included quarterback Leach, running backs Russell Davis and Harlan Huckleby, linebacker Jerry Meter, defensive end Tom Seabron, and linemen John Arbeznik, Jon Giesler, and Curtis Greer.

Offensive guard Kirk Lewis and defensive back Don Dufek were selected as the team's co-captains. In the final major scrimmage of the prior to the start of the season, Lewis broke his arm and was lost for the season.

=== Wisconsin ===
Week 1: Michigan at Wisconsin

Team	1	2	3	4	Total
• Michigan	0	10	3	10	23
Wisconsin	3	3	0	0	6

- Date: September 13
- Location: Madison, WI
- Game attendance: 79,022

Scoring summary
1	8:39	WIS	Vince Lamia 22-yard field goal	WIS 3–0
2		MICH	Rob Lytle 15-yard run (Bob Wood kick)	MICH 7–3
2	4:51	WIS	Lamia 31-yard field goal	MICH 7–6
2		MICH	Wood 22-yard field goal	MICH 10–6
3	7:16	MICH	Wood 25-yard field goal	MICH 13–6
4		MICH	Wood 22-yard field goal	MICH 16–6
4	1:08	Michigan	Gordon Bell 7-yard pass from Rick Leach (Wood kick)	MICH 23–6

On September 13, 1975, Michigan opened its season with a 23–6 victory over Wisconsin before a record-setting crowd of 79,022 at Camp Randall Stadium in Madison, Wisconsin. In his first college game, quarterback Rich Leach rushed for 30 yards on eight carries and completed only two of 10 passes for 34 yards and three interceptions. Senior tailback Gordon Bell rushed for 210 yards and a touchdown on 28 carries. It was the first 200-yard game by a Michigan back since Billy Taylor in 1969. The Wolverines rushed for a total of 394 yards with Rob Lytle adding 91 yards and a touchdown. Bob Wood, appearing his first varsity game, contributed 11 points on three field goals and two extra point kicks.

Michigan's defense, led by linebacker Calvin O'Neal and middle guard Tim Davis, held Wisconsin to 98 rushing yards and 38 passing yards. Wisconsin's two field goals followed Michigan turnovers – a fumble by Bell at Michigan's 32-yard line in the first quarter and an interception in the second quarter that gave Wisconsin the ball at Michigan's 27-yard line. Wisconsin's star back Billy Marek was held to 58 yards on 21 carries. After the game, Wisconsin assistant coach Chuck McBride called it the most disappointing loss in his six years at Wisconsin and concluded that "Michigan's defense intimidated our offense." Head coach John Jardine credited Michigan's defensive front: "They whipped us up front pretty good. We were just blown off."

=== Stanford ===
Week 2: Stanford at Michigan

Team	1	2	3	4	Total
Stanford	6	0	0	13	19
Michigan	0	7	6	6	19

- Date: September 20
- Location: Ann Arbor, MI
- Game start: 1:30 p.m.
- Game attendance: 92,304

Scoring summary
1		STAN	Tony Hill 25-yard pass from Mike Cordova (Mike Langford kick failed)	STAN 6–0
2		MICH	Jim Smith 48-yard pass from Rick Leach (Bob Wood kick)	MICH 7–6
3		MICH	Wood 27-yard field goal	MICH 10–6
3		MICH	Wood 29-yard field goal	MICH 13–6
4		STAN	Todd Anderson 4-yard pass from Cordova (Langford kick)	TIE 13–13
4	5:51	MICH	Wood 32-yard field goal	MICH 16–13
4	3:41	STAN	Langford 40-yard field goal	TIE 16–16
4	1:36	MICH	Wood 42-yard field goal	MICH 19–16
4	:09	STAN	Langford 33-yard field goal	TIE 19–19

On September 20, 1975, Michigan and Stanford played to a 19–19 tie before a crowd of 92,304 at Michigan Stadium in Ann Arbor.

Stanford took a 6–0 lead in the first quarter on a 25-yard touchdown pass from Mike Cordova to Tony Hill, but missed the extra point. At the end of the second quarter, Rick Leach threw a 48-yard bomb to Jim Smith to give Michigan a 7–6 lead at halftime. Michigan's Bob Wood kicked two field goals in the third quarter to extend the lead to 13–6.

In the fourth quarter, Stanford tied the game at 13–13 on a four-yard touchdown pass from Cordova to Todd Anderson. From that point, the teams traded four field goals. Wood kicked a 32-yarder to put Michigan ahead, 16–13 with 5:51 remaining, and Stanford's Mike Langford tied the game again with 3:41 remaining. Wood kicked what appeared to be a game-winning 42-yarder with 1:36 remaining in the game, but Stanford drove 55 yards in the final minute-and-a-half, and Langford kicked a 33-yard field goal to tie the game with nine seconds remaining.

Michigan gained 467 yards of total offense. In his second game, Rick Leach rushed for 58 yards and completed six of 17 passes for 145 yards and an interception. Rob Lytle rushed for 113 yards, and Gordon Bell added 64 yards.

=== Baylor ===
Week 3: Baylor at Michigan

Team	1	2	3	4	Total
Baylor	7	0	7	0	14
Michigan	7	0	0	7	14

- Date: September 27
- Location: Ann Arbor, MI
- Game start: 1:30 p.m.
- Game attendance: 104,248

Scoring summary
1	MICH	Gordon Bell 6-yard run (Bob Wood kick)	MICH 7–0
1	BU	Cleveland Franklin 2-yard run (Hicks kick)	TIE 7–7
3	BU	Mark Jackson 1-yard run (Hicks kick)	BU 14–7
4	MICH	Gordon Bell 1-yard run (Wood kick)	TIE 14–14

On September 27, 1975, Michigan and defending Southwestern Conference champion Baylor played to a 14–14 tie before a crowd of 104,248 at Michigan Stadium. Michigan drove down the field for a touchdown on its first possession of the game, but was unable to score again until the fourth quarter. Gordon Bell scored both of Michigan's touchdowns. Baylor's Bubba Hicks missed a 39-yard field goal with six seconds remaining in the game. Baylor out-gained Michigan by 338 yards to 219.

=== Missouri ===
Week 4: Missouri at Michigan

Team	1	2	3	4	Total
Missouri	0	0	0	7	7
• Michigan	7	3	14	7	31

- Date: October 4
- Location: Michigan Stadium
- Game start: 1:30 p.m.
- Game attendance: 104,578

Scoring summary
1		MICH	Rob Lytle 1-yard run (Bob Wood kick)	MICH 7–0
2		MICH	Wood 40-yard field goal	MICH 10–0
3		MICH	Lytle 19-yard run (Wood kick)	MICH 17–0
3		MICH	Rick Leach 12-yard run (Wood kick)	MICH 24–0
4	5:36	MICH	Harlan Huckleby 11-yard run (Wood kick)	MICH 31–0
4	1:09	MO	Charley Douglass 5-yard pass from Pete Woods (Gibbons kick)	MICH 31–7

On October 4, 1975, Michigan defeated Missouri, 31–7, at Michigan Stadium. Michigan was ranked No. 12 by the AP prior to the game, and Missouri No. 5. The game attracted 104,578, the third largest crowd in Michigan Stadium history. The victory was the 100th in Bo Schembechler's head coaching career.

Michigan rushed for 372 yards, including 119 yards from Gordon Bell, 97 yards and a touchdown from Rick Leach, 68 yards and two touchdowns from Rob Lytle, and 45 yards and a touchdown from Harlan Huckleby. The defense held Missouri to 253 total yards and recovered three Missouri fumbles. Middle guard Tim Davis was selected by both the Associated Press and United Press International as the Big Ten player of the week for his performance against Missouri, which included nine solo tackles.

=== Michigan State ===
Week 5: Michigan at Michigan State

Team	1	2	3	4	Total
• Michigan	0	6	0	10	16
Michigan State	3	0	3	0	6

- Date: October 11
- Location: East Lansing, MI
- Game attendance: 79,776
- TV announcers (ABC): Keith Jackson, Bud Wilkinson

Scoring summary
1	5:45	MSU	Hans Nielsen 46-yard field goal	MSU 3–0
2		MICH	Bob Wood 33-yard field goal	TIE 3–3
2		MICH	Wood 46-yard field goal	MICH 6–3
3		MSU	Nielsen 43-yard field goal	TIE 6–6
4		MICH	Gordon Bell 18-yard run (Wood kick)	MICH 13–6
4		MICH	Wood 25-yard field goal	MICH 16–6

On October 11, 1975, Michigan, ranked No. 8 by the AP, defeated No. 15 Michigan State, 16–6, in a nationally televised game played before a crowd of 79,776 at Spartan Stadium in East Lansing, Michigan.

In the first three quarters, the scoring was limited to field goals, two by Michigan's Bob Wood and two by the Spartans' Danish kicker, Hans Nielsen. Both of the Spartans' field goals were set up by Michigan turnovers – a fumble by Gordon Bell at Michigan's 27-yard line in the first quarter and a fumbled punt by Dwight Hicks in the third quarter.

At the end of the third quarter, Jim Smith fielded a punt at midfield and returned it to the Michigan State 39-yard line. On fourth-and-one, Rick Leach freed himself from a tackler behind the line of scrimmage and converted the first down. Two plays later, Gordon Bell put the Wolverines ahead with a 19-yard touchdown run. Wood later added his third field goal.

Rob Lytle led the Wolverines for 111 yards on 20 carries, and Bell totaled 105 yards on 19 carries. Rick Leach completed two of six passes for 38 yards and was intercepted once. Michigan State fumbled five times, Michigan recovering three.

=== Northwestern ===
Week 6: Northwestern at Michigan

Team	1	2	3	4	Total
Northwestern	0	0	0	0	0
• Michigan	14	20	7	28	69

- Date: October 18
- Location: Ann Arbor, MI
- Game start: 1:30 p.m.
- Game attendance: 86,201

Scoring summary
1	7:50	MICH	Gordon Bell 1-yard run (Bob Wood kick)	MICH 7–0
1		MICH	Bell 7-yard run (Wood kick)	MICH 14–0
2		MICH	Rob Lytle 7-yard run (Wood kick)	MICH 21–0
2		MICH	Lytle 47-yard run (Wood kick)	MICH 28–0
2		MICH	Jim Smith 20-yard pass from Mark Elzinga (kick failed)	MICH 34–0
3		MICH	Dave Devich 23-yard interception return (Wood kick)	MICH 41–0
4		MICH	Harlan Huckleby 27-yard run (Greg Willner kick)	MICH 48–0
4		MICH	Huckleby 1-yard run (Willner kick)	MICH 55–7
4		MICH	Elzinga 12-yard run (Willner kick)	MICH 62–7
4	0:33	MICH	Tom Seabron 40-yard fumble return (Willner kick)	MICH 69–0

On October 18, 1967, Michigan defeated Northwestern, 69–0, before a crowd of 86,201 at Michigan Stadium. It was Northwestern's worst loss since 1899, and Michigan had not achieved a greater margin of victory since its 85–0 victory over Chicago in 1939. Northwestern, coached by Bo Schembechler's college roommate John Pont, came into the game with a 3–2 record, having defeated Indiana the prior week by a 30–0 score.

Michigan tied a Big Ten record with 573 rushing yards as three separate backs had 100-yard games. First-string tailback Gordon Bell, who did not play after the first quarter, gained 100 yards on 14 carries and scored two touchdowns. Second-string tailback Rob Lytle, who did not play after halftime, gained 105 yards on eight carries and scored two touchdowns. Third-string tailback Harlan Huckleby added 157 yards on 18 carries and also scored two touchdowns.

The defense held Northwestern to 115 total yards, had five turnovers (four fumble recoveries and an interception), and scored twice – first on a 23-yard interception return by linebacker Dave Devich and later, with less than a minute remaining in the game, freshman defensive end Tom Seabron ripped the ball from the hands of Northwestern's backup quarterback and returned it 40 yards. Northwestern's starting quarterback Randy Dean came into the game as the conference leader in total offense, but ended up with minus two rushing yards and completed only two of 11 passes for 24 yards.

=== Indiana ===
Week 7: Indiana at Michigan

Team	1	2	3	4	Total
Indiana	0	0	0	7	7
• Michigan	14	20	14	7	55

- Date: October 25
- Location: Ann Arbor, MI
- Game start: 1:30 p.m.

Scoring summary
1	MICH	Jim Smith 77-yard run (Bob Wood kick)	MICH 7–0
1	MICH	Gordon Bell 53-yard run (Wood kick)	MICH 14–0
2	MICH	Rob Lytle 1-yard run (Wood kick)	MICH 21–0
2	MICH	Lytle 7-yard run (kick failed)	MICH 27–0
2	MICH	Lytle 1-yard run (Wood kick)	MICH 34–0
3	MICH	Russell Davis 1-yard run (Wood kick)	MICH 41–0
3	MICH	R. Davis 3-yard run (Wood kick)	MICH 48–0
4	IND	Terry Jones 1-yard run (Stavroff kick)	MICH 48–7
4	MICH	Lytle 12-yard run (Willner kick)	MICH 55–7

On October 25, 1975, Michigan defeated Lee Corso's Indiana Hoosiers, 55–7, before a homecoming crowd of 93,857 at Michigan Stadium. Michigan outgained Indiana, 576 yards to 145 yards. Rob Lytle rushed for 147 yards and four touchdowns on 22 carries, and Gordon Bell added 117 yards and a touchdown on 14 carries. Jim Smith also had 77-yard touchdown run in the first quarter. Rick Leach rushed for 52 yards and completed three of six passes for 42 yards. Russell Davis also scored two touchdowns. The Wolverines gave up no turnovers.

=== Minnesota ===
Week 8: Michigan at Minnesota

Team	1	2	3	4	Total
• Michigan	7	14	0	7	28
michigan	7	7	7	0	21

- Date: November 1
- Location: Minneapolis
- Game attendance: 33,191

Scoring summary
1		MICH	Rob Lytle 4-yard run (Bob Wood kick)	MICH 7–0
1		MINN	Bill Sims 1-yard pass from Tony Dungy (Kocourek kick)	TIE 7–7
	MICH	Gordon Bell 5-yard run (Wood kick)	MICH 14–7
2		MICH	Rick Leach 3-yard run (Wood kick)	MICH 21–7
2		MINN	Ron Kulas 14-yard pass from Dungy (Kocourek kick)	MICH 21–14
3		MINN	Bobby Holmes 16-yard run (Kocourek kick)	TIE 21–21
4	6:56	MICH	Bell 23-yard run (Wood kick)	MICH 28–21

On November 1, 1975, Michigan defeated Minnesota, 28–21, before a crowd of 33,191 at Memorial Stadium in Minneapolis. With the victory, the Little Brown Jug remained with the Wolverines for the eighth consecutive year.

Minnesota quarterback Tony Dungy, raised in Jackson, Michigan, completed 17 of 31 passes for 198 yards, including a 16-yard touchdown pass to Bobby Holmes that tied the score at 21–21 in the third quarter. With two touchdown passes in the game, Dungy broke Minnesota's school record with 10 touchdown passes during the 1975 season. Minnesota's 21 points were the most scored against a Michigan team since 1969.

Michigan rushed for 345 yards, as tailback Gordon Bell led the way with 172 rushing yards, pushing over 1,000 yards for the second consecutive year. Bell also scored two touchdowns, including the game-winner on a 23-yard run with 6:56 remaining in the game. The drive that led to Bell's second touchdown began when Dwight Hicks returned a punt 21 yards to Minnesota's 38-yard line. Rob Lytle added 80 yards and one touchdown.

Michigan was penalized in the game for roughing the punter, fair catch interference, and multiple instances of pass interference, including a penalty called against Dwight Hicks that negated his goal-line interception and led to Minnesota's first touchdown. In addition, split end Jim Smith was ejected from the game for fighting with free safety Doug Beaudoin. After the game, Bo Schembechler criticized the officiating: "There was incompetence all around us today, and I don't mean either my ball club or the Minnesota team. I don't care if you are from Minnesota or not, what went on today was unbelievable officiating."

=== Purdue ===
Week 9: Purdue at Michigan

Team	1	2	3	4	Total
Purdue	0	0	0	0	0
• Michigan	14	0	0	14	28

- Date: November 8
- Location: Ann Arbor, MI
- Game start: 1:30 p.m.
- Game attendance: 102,414

Scoring summary
1	MICH	Gordon Bell 20-yard run (Bob Wood kick)	MICH 7–0
1	MICH	Jim Smith 83-yard pass from Rick Leach (Wood kick)	MICH 14–0
4	MICH	Bell 3-yard run (Wood kick)	MICH 28–0
4	MICH	Leach 2-yard run (Wood kick)	MICH 28–0

On November 9, 1975, Michigan defeated Purdue, 28–0, before a crowd of 102,415 at Michigan Stadium. The Wolverines out-gained the Boilermakers by a total of 501 yards to 288 yards. Rick Leach rushed for 68 yards and a touchdown and completed six of nine passes for 218 yards and a touchdown. Gordon Bell added 94 rushing yards and Rob Lytle another 80 yards. Linebacker Calvin O'Neal was selected by the Associated Press as the Big Ten defensive player of the week for his performance against Purdue which included eight solo tackles and six assists.

The victory over Purdue began Michigan's streak, which has now run for more than 49 years, in which 100,000 or more fans have attended every Michigan football game at Michigan Stadium.

=== Illinois ===
Week 10: Michigan at Illinois

Team	1	2	3	4	Total
• Michigan	14	0	7	0	21
Illinois	0	0	0	15	15

- Date: November 15
- Location: Champaign, IL
- Game attendance: 45,077

Scoring summary
1		MICH	Gordon Bell 2-yard run (kick failed)	MICH 6–0
1		MICH	Bell 1-yard run (Rob Lytle run)	MICH 14–0
3		MICH	Rick Leach 1-yard run (Bob Wood kick)	MICH 21–0
4		ILL	Fuzzie Johnson 5-yard pass from Kurt Steger (Beaver kick)	MICH 21–7
4	1:19	ILL	Jim "Chubby" Phillips 2-yard run (Johnson pass from Steger)	MICH 21–15

On November 15, 1975, Michigan defeated Illinois, 21–15, before a crowd of 45,077 at Memorial Stadium in Champaign, Illinois.

In the first quarter, Illinois fullback Steve Greene fumbled at the Illinois 30-yard line, and Michigan's Don Dufek recovered the loose ball. Two runs by Gordon Bell advanced the ball to the two-yard line, and Bell then scored on a two-yard run. Bob Wood's kick for extra point failed, and Michigan led, 6–0. On their next possession, the Wolverines drove 52 yards in 12 plays and scored on another short run by bell. Rob Lytle ran for a two-point conversion, and Michigan led, 14–0.

In the second quarter, Michigan twice turned the ball over in Illinois territory, once at the 33-yard line and then by Bell at the 13-yard line.

In the third quarter, Dwight Hicks intercepted a halfback pass at Michigan's 32-yard line and returned it 22 yards to the Illinois 46-yard line. From there, the Wolverines drove 46 yards for their third touchdown, with Rick Leach scoring on a one-yard run.

In the fourth quarter, Lytle fumbled at the Illinois 43-yard line, and Illini quarterback Kurt Steger threw passes of 23 yards to Fuzzie Johnson, nine yards to Jeff Chrystal, and then a five-yard touchdown pass to Johnson. Illinois scored again on a short run by Jim "Chubby" Phillips and passed for a two-point conversion with 1:19 remaining. Illinois then attempted an onside kick, but Michigan tight end Mark Schmerge grabbed the ball to secure the victory.

Michigan fumbled six times, losing it four times. Coach Schembechler described the fumbles as "the story of the game", adding: "There's never an excuse for a fumble. Never. Unless of course, someone has a heart attack running down the field. Otherwise, there's never an excuse. Those were my best men who dropped those balls." Gordon Bell rushed for 140 yards and two touchdowns on 30 carries. Dwight Hicks had two interceptions, and Dan Jilek had another.

=== Ohio State ===
Week 11: Ohio State at Michigan

Team	1	2	3	4	Total
• Ohio State	7	0	0	14	21
Michigan	0	7	0	7	14

- Date: November 22
- Location: Ann Arbor, MI
- Game start: 12:30 p.m.
- Game attendance: 105,543
- Game weather: Clear, 36 °F (2 °C)
- TV announcers (ABC): Keith Jackson, Bud Wilkinson

Scoring summary
1	4:43	OSU	Pete Johnson 7-yard pass from Cornelius Greene (Tom Klaban kick)	OSU 7–0
2	0:24	MICH	Jim Smith 11-yard pass from Gordon Bell (Bob Wood kick)	TIE 7–7
4	7:11	MICH	Rick Leach 1-yard run (Bob Wood kick)	MICH 14–7
4	3:18	OSU	P. Johnson 1-yard run (Klaban kick)	TIE 14–14
4		OSU	P. Johnson 3-yard run (Klaban)	OSU 21–14

On November 22, 1975, Michigan, ranked No. 4 by the AP, lost to No. 1 Ohio State, 21–14, at Michigan Stadium. The crowd of 105,543 established a new NCAA attendance record. The loss ended Michigan's 41-game unbeaten streak at home.

In the first quarter, Ohio State took a 7–0 lead on a 63-yard, 15-play drive ending with a seven-yard touchdown pass from Cornelius Greene to Pete Johnson. At the end of the second quarter, Michigan drove 80 yards in 11 plays, including a 30-yard pass from Rick Leach to Keith Johnson. Then, with 24 seconds remaining in the half, tailback Gordon Bell threw an 11-yard touchdown pass to Jim Smith. The game was tied, 7–7, at halftime.

Michigan did not allow Ohio State to convert a first down in the third and fourth quarters. In the fourth quarter, Michigan drove 43 yards in 10 plays, and Leach ran one yard for a touchdown. Michigan led, 14–7, with 7:11 remaining. After Leach's touchdown, Ohio State rallied, driving 80 yards in 11 plays with Pete Johnson scoring on fourth-and-one to tie the score with 3:18 remaining. On Michigan's ensuing possession, Ohio State safety Ray Griffin intercepted a Leach pass at the Michigan 32-yard line and returned it to the three-yard line with 2:23 remaining. Pete Johnson scored on the next play, and Ohio had a 21–14 lead. On Michigan's final possession, Leach was again intercepted with a minute-and-a-half remaining in the game.

On defense, Michigan held Heisman Trophy winner Archie Griffin to 46 yards on 19 carries – ending Griffin's NCAA record 31-game streak of 100-yard games. Ohio State coach Woody Hayes said afterward: "This is the best Arch has ever been defended. They played up front tight as hell, but it opened some things up for the pass." Ohio State quarterback Cornelius Greene completed seven of 16 passes for 84 yards, a touchdown, and two interceptions. Pete Johnson rushed for 52 yards and two touchdowns on 18 carries.

Michigan out-gained the Buckeyes by 361 yards to 212 yards. Rick Leach completed seven of 20 passes for 102 yards and three interceptions (two of them in the final two-and-a-half minutes). Tailback Gordon Bell rushed for 124 yards on 21 carries, and fullback Rob Lytle contributed 104 yards on 18 carries.

=== Orange Bowl ===
Orange Bowl: Michigan vs. Oklahoma

Team	1	2	3	4	Total
Michigan	0	0	0	6	6
• Oklahoma	0	7	0	7	14

- Date: January 1
- Location: Orange Bowl, Miami
- Game start: 7:45 p.m.
- Game attendance: 80,307
- TV announcers (NBC): Jim Simpson and John Brodie

Scoring summary
2	OKL	Billy Brooks 39-yard run (Tony DiRienzo kick)	OKL 7–0
4	OKL	Steve Davis 10-yard run (Tony DiRienzo kick)	OKL 14–0
4	MICH	Gordon Bell 2-yard run (run failed)	OKL 14–6

On January 1, 1976, Michigan lost to Oklahoma, 14–6, before a crowd of 80,307 in the 1976 Orange Bowl game at the Miami Orange Bowl. It was Michigan's first appearance in a bowl game since the 1972 Rose Bowl.

Oklahoma went ahead 7–0 in the second quarter on a 39-yard end around by Billy Brooks. The Sooners extended their lead to 14–0 in the fourth quarter on a 10-yard touchdown run by Steve Davis. Later in the fourth quarter, Oklahoma fumbled, and Michigan linebacker Dave Devich recovered the loose ball at Oklahoma's two-yard line. From there, Gordon Bell then ran for a touchdown, but Michigan's attempt at a two-point conversion failed.

Oklahoma out-gained Michigan by 345 yards to 202 yards. Michigan had difficulty moving the ball against an Oklahoma defense led by Lee Roy Selmon, Dewey Selmon, and Jimbo Elrod. In the second quarter, Rick Leach took a shot to the head from Oklahoma defensive back Jerry Anderson. Leach was "knocked dizzy" and did not return to the game until the fourth quarter. Coach Schembechler argued for a penalty, but none was called, and Anderson defended the hit: "I just clotheslined him real good. . . . I didn't think it was no cheap shot. It was what you call a kayo."

Leach ended up with 62 rushing yards on 13 carries, but completed only two of 16 passes for 33 yards and threw two interceptions. Michigan did not complete a pass until the final minute of the game. Gordon Bell was held to 53 yards on 18 carries, and Rob Lytle gained only 32 yards on 10 carries.

For Oklahoma, quarterback Steve Davis completed three of five passes for 63 yards, Joe Washington rushed for 73 yards on 17 carries, and Tinker Owens caught three passes for 63 yards.

=== Award season ===
When the 1975 All-America team selections were announced, four Michigan players were recognized:

- Defensive back Don Dufek received first-team honors from the American Football Coaches Association, the Football Writers Association of America, Football News, and the Walter Camp Football Foundation. Dufek also received second-team honors from the United Press International (UPI).
- Middle guard Tim Davis received second-team honors from the Associated Press (AP) and UPI.
- Linebacker Calvin O'Neal received second-team honors from the Newspaper Enterprise Association.
- Running back Gordon Bell received third-team honors from the AP.

In addition, ten Michigan players received first- or second-team honors from the AP or UPI on the 1975 All-Big Ten Conference football team: defensive back Don Dufek (AP-1, UPI-1); nose guard Tim Davis (AP-1, UPI-1); running back Gordon Bell (AP-1, UPI-1); wide receiver Jim Davis (AP-1, UPI-1); defensive end Dan Jilek (AP-1, UPI-1); linebacker Calvin O'Neal (AP-2, UPI-1); defensive tackle Greg Morton (AP-2, UPI-1); center Jim Czirr (UPI-1); offensive guard Mark Donahue (UPI-2); and defensive back Jim Pickens (UPI-2).

On November 25, 1975, Michigan's players selected Gordon Bell as the team's most valuable player. Bell led the team in rushing with 1,390 yards and in scoring with 84 points on 14 touchdowns. Other team awards were presented as follows:

- Meyer Morton Award: Dan Jilek
- John Maulbetsch Award: Dwight Hicks
- Frederick Matthei Award: Jim Smith
- Arthur Robinsion Scholarship Award: Dan Jilek

== Personnel ==
=== Full roster ===
1975 Michigan Wolverines football team roster
Players
Coaches
Offense

Pos.	#	Name	Class
RB	5	Gordon Bell	Sr
SE	29	Jerry Collins	Sr
FB	34	Scott Corbin	So
C	52	James Czirr	Sr
FB		Russell Davis	Fr
G	60	Mark Donahue	So
C	72	Walt Downing	So
OT	73	Bill Dufek	So
QB	16	Mark Elzinga	Sr
OT	70	James Hall	Jr
RB		Harlan Huckleby	Fr
C	51	Thomas Jensen	Sr
TE		Gene Johnson	Fr
SE, DB	27	Keith Johnson	Sr
OT	73	Mike Kenn	So
OT	67	Steven King	Sr
QB	7	Rick Leach	Fr
G	74	Kirk Lewis	Sr
FB	41	Rob Lytle	Jr
G	63	Les Miles	Sr
C	50	Steve Nauta	Sr
TE	80	George Przygodski	Sr
RB	43	Max Richardson	So
TE		Mark Schmerge	Fr
SE	37	Jim Smith	Jr
SE	85	Curt Stephenson	Jr
G	69	Gerry Szara	So
TE	89	Pete Traber	So
SE	84	Richard White	Jr

Defense

Pos.	#	Name	Class
DE	86	John Anderson	So
DB	22	Jim Bolden	Jr
DB	4	Philip Brumbaugh	Sr
MG	56	Tim Davis	Sr
LB	55	David Devich	Sr
DB	35	Don Dufek	Sr
DT	71	John Hennessy	Jr
S	17	Dwight Hicks	Sr
DT	93	Bill Hoban	Sr
DE	40	Michael Holmes	Sr
CB	10	Derek Howard	So
DE	81	Dan Jilek	Sr
DB	21	Kurt Kampe	Sr
MG	92	Richard Koschalk	Sr
MG	62	Bob Lang	Jr
LB	49	Rex Mackall	So
DT	77	Greg Morton	Jr
LB	96	Calvin O'Neal	Jr
DT	97	Jeff Perlinger	Sr
DE	90	Eric Phelps	So
S	18	Jim Pickens	So
DT	76	Charles Randolph	Sr
DE, TE		Tom Seabron	Fr
LB	42	Michael Strabley	Jr
DE	94	Greg Strinko	Sr
LB	39	Jerry Vogele	Jr
S	1	Dave Whiteford	Jr
S	8	Jerry Zuver	Jr

Special teams

Pos.	#	Name	Class

Head coach

- Bo Schembechler

Coordinators/assistant coaches

- Gary Moeller - defensive coordinator
- Jack Harbaugh - defensive backfield
- Bill McCartney - defensive ends
- Tom Reed - defensive line
- Chuck Stobart - offensive backfield
- Jerry Hanlon - offensive line
- Paul Schudel - offensive line
- Dennis Brown
- Tirrel Burton
- Mike Hollway - graduate assistant
- Jed Hughes

Legend

- (C) Team captain
- (S) Suspended
- (I) Ineligible
- Injured
- Redshirt

=== Letter winners, offense ===
- Gordon Bell, tailback, senior, Troy, Ohio – started all 12 games at tailback
- Jerry Collins, split end, senior, Ann Arbor, Michigan
- Scott Corbin, fullback, sophomore, Cincinnati, Ohio – started 1 game at safety
- James C. Czirr, center, senior, St. Joseph, Michigan – started all 12 games at center
- Russell Davis, tailback, freshman, Woodbridge, Virginia
- Mark Donahue, offensive guard, sophomore, Oak Lawn, Illinois – started 10 games at left offensive guard, 1 at right offensive guard
- Walt Downing, offensive guard, sophomore, Coatesville, Pennsylvania – started all 12 games (11 at right offensive guard, 1 at left offensive guard)
- Bill Dufek, offensive tackle, sophomore, East Grand Rapids, Michigan – started all 12 games at right offensive tackle
- Mark Elzinga, quarterback, senior, Bay City, Michigan – started 1 game at quarterback
- James D. Hall, offensive tackle, junior, Ypsilanti, Michigan
- Harlan Huckleby, tailback, freshman, Detroit, Michigan
- Thomas P. Jensen, center, senior, Springfield, Illinois
- Gene Johnson, tight end, freshman, Flint, Michigan
- Keith Johnson, split end – defensive back, senior, Munster, Indiana – started 11 games at split end
- Mike Kenn, offensive tackle, sophomore, Evanston, Illinois – started 9 games at left offensive tackle
- R. Steven King, offensive tackle, senior, Tiffin, Ohio – started 3 games at left offensive tackle
- Rick Leach, quarterback, freshman, Flint, Michigan – started 11 games at quarterback
- Rob Lytle, fullback, junior, Fremont, Ohio – started all 12 games at fullback
- Les Miles, offensive guard, senior, Elyria, Ohio – started 1 game at left offensive guard
- Steve Nauta, center, sophomore, Plymouth Meeting, Pennsylvania
- George Przygodski, tight end, senior, Grand Rapids, Michigan – started 5 games at tight end
- Max Richardson, tailback, wing back, Fort Wayne, Indiana
- Mark Schmerge, tight end, freshman, Cincinnati, Ohio – started 6 games at tight end
- Jim Smith, split end, junior, Blue Island, Illinois – started all 12 games at wing back
- Curt Stephenson, split end, junior, La Jolla, California
- Jerry Szara, offensive guard, sophomore, Oak Lawn, Illinois
- Pete Traber, tight end, sophomore, Columbia, Maryland – started 1 game at tight end
- Richard A. White, split end, junior, Cincinnati, Ohio – started 1 game at split end
- Bob Wood, placekicker, junior, London, Ohio

=== Letter winners, defense ===
- John Anderson, defensive end, sophomore, Waukesha, Wisconsin – started 1 game at right defensive end
- Jim Bolden, defensive back, junior, Akron, Ohio – started 11 games at weak-side defensive halfback
- Philip J. Brumbaugh, defensive back, senior, Greenville, Ohio
- Tim Davis, middle guard, senior, Warren, Ohio – started 11 games at middle guard
- David Devich, linebacker, senior, Highland, Indiana – started all 12 games at middle linebacker
- Don Dufek, wolfman, senior, East Grand Rapids, Michigan – started all 12 games at wolfman
- John Hennessy, defensive tackle, junior, Chicago, Illinois – started 3 games at left defensive tackle, 1 at right defensive tackle
- Dwight Hicks, safety, sophomore, Pennsauken, New Jersey – started 10 games at safety
- Bill Hoban, defensive tackle, senior, Chicago, Illinois
- Michael G. Holmes, defensive end, senior, Akron, Ohio – started 10 games at right defensive end, 1 at left defensive end
- Derek Howard, defensive back, sophomore, Hamilton, Ohio – started 1 game at weak-side defensive halfback
- Dan Jilek, defensive end, senior, Sterling Heights, Michigan – started all 12 games (11 at left defensive end, 1 at right defensive end)
- Kurt Kampe III, defensive back, senior, Defiance, Ohio
- Richard A. Koschalk, middle guard, senior, Toledo, Ohio – started 1 game at middle guard
- Bob Lang, middle guard, junior, Chicago, Illinois
- Rex Mackall, linebacker, sophomore, Berea, Ohio
- Greg Morton, defensive tackle, junior, Akron, Ohio – started 10 games at right defensive tackle, 1 at left defensive tackle
- Calvin O'Neal, linebacker, junior, Saginaw, Michigan – started all 12 games at wide linebacker
- Jeff Perlinger, defensive tackle, senior, Crystal, Minnesota – started 8 games at left defensive tackle
- Eric Phelps, defensive end, sophomore, Salem, New Hampshire
- Jim Pickens, safety, sophomore, Sylvania, Ohio – started all 12 games (11 at strong-side defensive halfback, 1 at safety)
- Charles D. Randolph, defensive tackle, senior, Amelia, Ohio
- Tom Seabron, defensive end – tight end, freshman, Detroit, Michigan
- Michael Strabley, linebacker, junior, Massillon, Ohio
- Greg Strinko, defensive end, senior, Middletown, Ohio
- Jerry Vogele, linebacker, junior, Cincinnati, Ohio
- Dave Whiteford, safety, junior, Traverse City, Michigan
- Jerry Zuver, safety, junior, Archbold, Ohio – started 1 game at strong-side defensive halfback

=== Professional football ===
The following players were drafted in the 1976 NFL draft.

Player	Position	Round	Pick	NFL club
Gordon Bell	Running Back	4	104	New York Giants
Dan Jilek	Linebacker	4	109	Buffalo Bills
Don Dufek	Defensive Back	5	126	Seattle Seahawks
Steve King	Tackle	5	129	New York Jets
Jim Czirr	Center	9	252	Denver Broncos
Jeff Perlinger	Defensive End	10	268	San Diego Chargers

=== Coaching staff ===
- Head coach: Bo Schembechler
- Assistant coaches:

- Gary Moeller - defensive coordinator
- Jack Harbaugh - defensive backfield coach
- Bill McCartney - defensive ends coach
- Tom Reed - defensive line coach
- Chuck Stobart - offensive backfield coach
- Jerry Hanlon - offensive line coach
- Paul Schudel - offensive line coach
- Dennis Brown
- Tirrel Burton
- Mike Hollway - graduate assistant
- Jed Hughes

- Trainer: Lindsy McLean
- Manager: Jeffrey L. Young

== Statistics ==
=== Rushing ===
Player	Attempts	Net yards	Yards per attempt	Touchdowns
Gordon Bell	273	1390	5.1	13
Rob Lytle	193	1030	5.3	10
Rick Leach	113	552	4.9	5
Jim Smith	31	237	7.6	1
Harlan Huckleby	31	228	7.4	3
Russell Davis	40	179	4.5	2

=== Passing ===
Player	Attempts	Completions	Interceptions	Comp %	Yards	Yds/Comp	TD	Long
Rick Leach	100	32	12	32.0	680	21.3	3	83
Mark Elzinga	23	8	3	34.8	133	16.6	1	28

=== Receiving ===
Player	Receptions	Yards	Yds/Recp	TD	Long
Jim Smith	24	553	23.0	4	83
Keith Johnson	6	130	21.7	0	29
Gordon Bell	7	84	12.0	1	na

=== Kickoff returns ===
Player	Returns	Yards	Yds/Return	TD	Long
Gordon Bell	9	227	25.2	0	64

=== Punt returns ===
Player	Returns	Yards	Yds/Return	TD	Long
Jim Smith	26	210	8.1	0	50
Dwight Hicks	9	63	7.0	0	21
