= Calvin O'Neal =

American football player (born 1954)

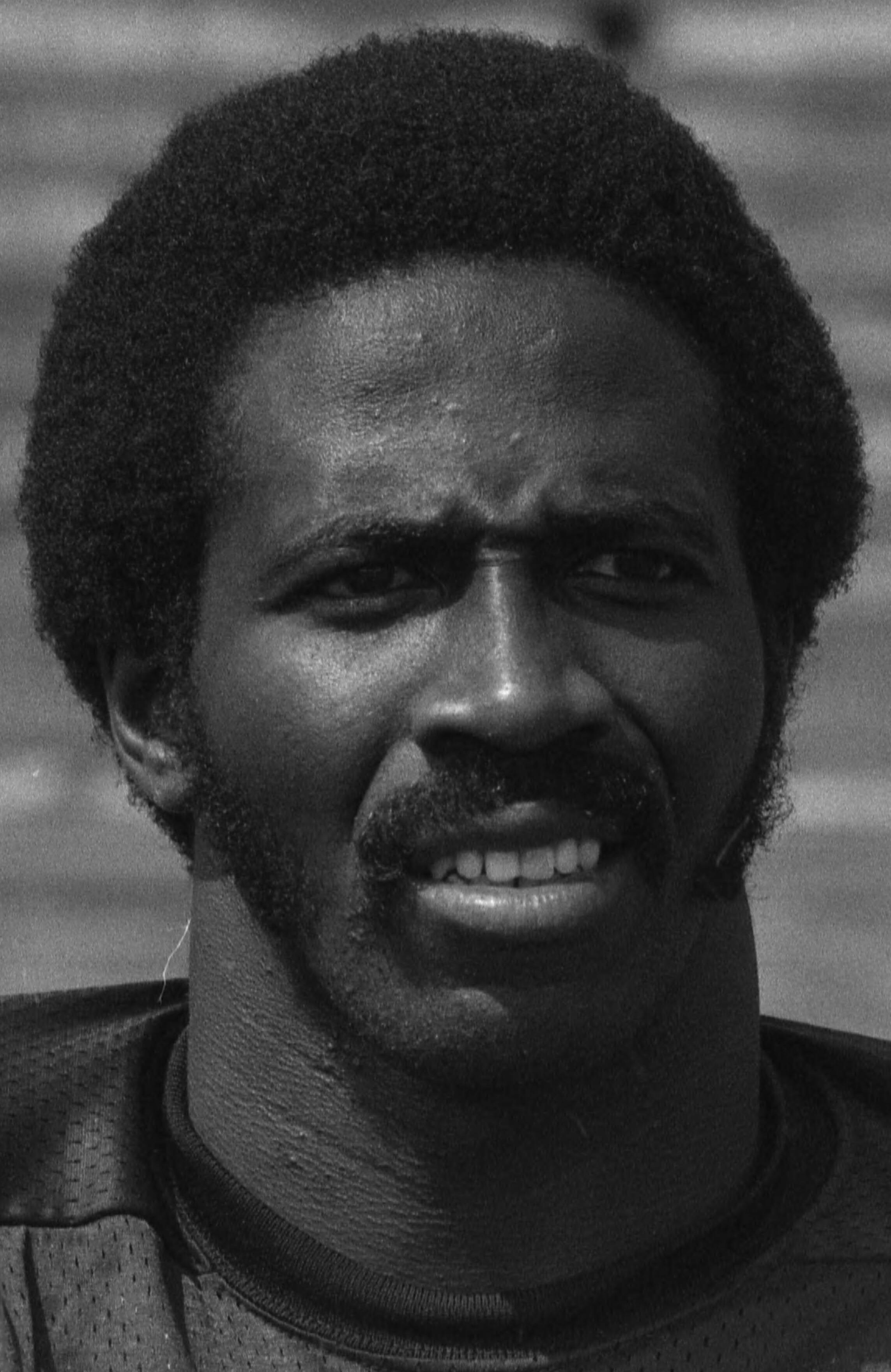
- O'Neal in 1976

No. 51
- Position: Linebacker

Personal information
- Born: October 6, 1954 (age 72); Osceola, Arkansas, U.S.
- Listed height: 6 ft 1 in (1.85 m)
- Listed weight: 235 lb (107 kg)

Career information
- High school: Saginaw (Saginaw, Michigan)
- College: Michigan
- NFL draft: 1977: 6th round, 163rd overall pick

Career history
- Baltimore Colts (1978)

Awards and highlights
- First-team All-American (1976); Second-team All-American (1975); 2× First-team All-Big Ten (1975, 1976)
- Stats at Pro Football Reference

Calvin O'Neal (born October 6, 1954) is an American former professional football player who was a linebacker for the Baltimore Colts of the National Football League (NFL) in 1978. He played college football for the Michigan Wolverines, earning first-team All-American honors while serving as team co-captain in 1976.

== Amateur career ==
O'Neal is a 1972 graduate of Saginaw High School, where he won All-State and All-Saginaw Valley honors in football and was named Most Valuable Player of the Saginaw Valley Conference, after averaging 14 tackles per game. He was also a standout in basketball and track and field at Saginaw High from 1969–71. O'Neal was teammates with quarterback Tom Slade both at Saginaw High School and at the University of Michigan.

He attended the University of Michigan on a football scholarship. He served as co-captain along with Rob Lytle and Kirk Lewis. The 1976 team was ranked #1 for eight weeks, but lost two of its last four games including a Rose Bowl loss to the USC Trojans. However, the team had four All-Americans (O'Neal, Lytle, Jim Smith, and Mark Donahue) as well as nine All Big Ten Conference players. O'Neal made ten tackles in his first game for the Wolverines, was twice named an All-Big Ten linebacker and was a Consensus All-American and team co-captain in 1976. He was a team leader on defense, setting a season record with 151 tackles in 1975, and had a record 378 tackles for his career. O'Neal combined strength and speed from his inside linebacking spot, and had three interceptions in 1976 for 60 return yards and a touchdown.

== Professional career ==
O'Neal was selected by the Baltimore Colts in the sixth round (163rd pick) of the 1977 NFL Draft. He played in 15 games for the Colts in 1978.

O'Neal lives in Shreveport, Louisiana. He is the founder of Lifestyle Business Affairs, an enrichment program for high school and collegiate student-athletes. O'Neal was inducted into the Saginaw County Sports Hall of Fame in 2003.
