= Seabron =

Seabron is an English surname. Notable people with the surname include:

- Dereon Seabron (born 2000), American basketball player
- Tom Seabron (1957–2024), American football player
