= Greg Morton =

American football player (born 1953)

No. 79
- Position: Defensive end

Personal information
- Born: October 8, 1953; Akron, Ohio, U.S.
- Died: January 23, 2025 (aged 71)
- Listed height: 6 ft 1 in (1.85 m)
- Listed weight: 230 lb (104 kg)

Career information
- College: Michigan
- NFL draft: 1977: 8th round, 197th overall pick

Career history
- Buffalo Bills (1977)

Awards and highlights
- 2× First-team All-Big Ten (1975, 1976)
- Stats at Pro Football Reference

Gregory Alan Morton (October 8, 1953 – January 23, 2025) was an American professional football player who was a defensive lineman for the Buffalo Bills of the National Football League (NFL) in 1977. He played college football for the Michigan Wolverines from 1973 to 1976. He was a starting defensive tackle in 34 of 35 games from 1974 to 1976. He was honored by the ABC television network as college football's defensive player of the year for 1976. At the end of his collegiate career, Morton ranked third in Michigan's all-time record book in both career tackles and career tackles for loss.

== Early life ==
Morton was born in Akron, Ohio, in 1953. He attended Akron Central High School which merged with another school in 1971 to former Central-Hower High School. He was the first student from Central-Hower to earn an NCAA Division I football scholarship.

== Michigan ==
Morton attended the University of Michigan where he played college football under head coach Bo Schembechler. After playing a reserve role in 1973, Morton was a starting defensive tackle for the Wolverines in 34 of 35 games from 1974 to 1976. Despite being only 6 feet, 2 inches, and 225 pounds, Morton became one of the best defensive linemen in the college game. Bo Schembechler called Morton the "quickest, most aggressive tackle in America," and added, "He's super quick, reacts like a cat and is surprisingly strong."

In 1974, he started all 11 games at the defensive tackle position for the 1974 Michigan Wolverines football team that held its opponents to an average of 6.8 points per game.

In 1975, Morton started 11 of 12 games at the defensive tackle position for the 1975 Michigan Wolverines football team that played in the 1976 Orange Bowl and finished the season ranked No. 8 in both the AP and UPI polls. Morton compiled 107 tackles and 11 sacks for 58 yards in 1975 and was selected as a first-team All-Big Ten player. In December 1975, the Associated Press published a feature story focusing on Morton's fondness for exotic flora, including a purple passion plant that Morton had named Claudine. The Los Angeles Times dubbed him "Michigan's Plant Man."

In his final season of collegiate football, Morton started all 12 games at defensive tackle for the 1976 Michigan Wolverines football team that won the Big Ten Conference championship, held opponents to an average of 7.9 points per game, played in the 1977 Rose Bowl and finished the season ranked No. 3 in both the AP and UPI polls. For the second consecutive year, Morton was selected as a first-team All-Big Ten player by both the AP and the UPI. He was selected by the ABC television network as the 1976 defensive player of the year in college football. He received the award ceremony broadcast on ABC during the Liberty Bowl; Tony Dorsett received the award as offensive player of the year.

At the end of his collegiate career, Morton had 268 career tackles. He ranked third in Michigan's record book in both career tackles and career tackles for loss.

In 1977, Morton received a bachelor of arts degree in history.

== Professional football ==
Morton was selected by the Buffalo Bills in the eighth round (197th overall pick) of the 1977 NFL draft. He appeared in nine games for the Bills during the 1977 NFL season, but he spent much of the season on the bench. In early December 1977, the Bills placed Morton on the inactive list to make room for a third quarterback to be added to the roster.

== Later life ==
After the 1977 season, Morton opted to return to the University of Michigan to pursue a doctoral degree from the school of education.

He subsequently became a probation officer in Fort Worth, Texas. As of 2002, he was also officiating high school football games in the Fort Worth area.

In 2001, Morton was inducted into the Summit County Sports Hall of Fame.

Morton died on January 23, 2025.
