= Mike Kenn =

American football player (born 1956)

No. 78
- Position: Offensive tackle

Personal information
- Born: February 9, 1956 (age 70); Evanston, Illinois, U.S.
- Listed height: 6 ft 7 in (2.01 m)
- Listed weight: 277 lb (126 kg)

Career information
- High school: Evanston Township (Evanston)
- College: Michigan
- NFL draft: 1978: 1st round, 13th overall pick

Career history
- Atlanta Falcons (1978–1994)

Awards and highlights
- 3× First-team All-Pro (1980, 1983, 1991); 2× Second-team All-Pro (1981, 1982); 5× Pro Bowl (1980–1984); PFWA All-Rookie Team (1978); Atlanta Falcons Ring of Honor; Second-team All-American (1977); First-team All-Big Ten (1977); Second-team All-Big Ten (1976); Alan Page Community Award (1991)

Career NFL statistics
- Games played: 251
- Games started: 251
- Fumble recoveries: 11
- Stats at Pro Football Reference

Michael Lee Kenn (born February 9, 1956) is an American former professional football player who spent his entire 17-year career as an offensive tackle for the Atlanta Falcons of the National Football League (NFL) from 1978 to 1994. He played college football for the Michigan Wolverines and was selected by the Falcons in the first round of the 1978 NFL draft with the 13th overall pick. Standing 6'7" and 277 lb, Kenn started all 251 NFL games in which he played. He holds the Falcons' franchise record for games started and games played. He was selected as a first-team All-Pro player in 1980, 1983 and 1991 and was invited to play in the Pro Bowl five consecutive years from 1980 to 1984.

== Early life ==
Kenn was born in Evanston, Illinois, in 1956. He attended Evanston Township High School. He played lacrosse and ice hockey in high school as well as football.

== College career ==
Kenn enrolled at the University of Michigan in 1974 and played college football at the offensive tackle position for head coach Bo Schembechler's Michigan Wolverines football teams from 1975 to 1977. When he arrived at Michigan in 1974, he was six feet, six-and-a-half inches tall and weighed 220 pounds. By 1976, his weight had increased to 245 pounds.

As a sophomore, Kenn started nine games at left tackle for the 1975 Michigan Wolverines football team that compiled an 8-2-2 record, scored 324 points, finished the year ranked #3 in the final AP Poll, and rushed for 3,840 yards (320 yards per game).

As a junior, Kenn started all 12 games at left tackle for the 1976 Michigan team that compiled a 10–2 record, scored 432 points, and rushed for 4,144 yards (345 yards per game).

As a senior, Kenn started 11 games at left tackle for the 1977 Michigan team that compiled a 10–2 record, scored 353 points, and rushed for 2,986 yards (249 yards per game). At the end of the 1977 season, Kenn was selected as a first-team All-Big Ten Conference tackle.

== Professional football ==
Kenn was selected by the Atlanta Falcons in the first round (13th overall pick) of the 1978 NFL draft. He signed a series of one-year contracts with the Falcons in May 1978. He started all 16 games for the Falcons at left tackle and was named to the NFL all-rookie team in 1978. In 1979, he again started all 16 games and allowed only four-and-a-half sacks and was penalized only four times. "He's quite close to becoming one of the elite tackles in the NFL" said his head coach Leeman Bennett. "If he can continue improvement of the first two years he could be the best in the NFL".

In 1980, Kenn was voted consensus All-Pro and was not flagged for a penalty all season and allowed just three-and-a-half sacks. "I've never seen any offensive tackle with his agility and quickness," said Bill Walsh. In 1981, Kenn was voted to his second Pro Bowl and was voted second-team All-Pro and allowed four sacks and was penalized only four times while starting all 16 games for the fourth consecutive season. Additionally, Kenn played every down (1,144) of the 1981 season, and has started 67 consecutive games without a miss. He had a remarkable penalty free streak of 26 consecutive games (New Orleans, 11/25/79 - St. Louis, 10/18/81) that included the entire 1980 season. Kenn was only flagged a total of seven times during the prior three seasons (three in 1979, zero in 1980, four in 1981), and played every down of the season in three of the previous four years (1979, 1980 and 1981). In 1982, Kenn started all nine games (seven games cancelled due to NFL players strike) and allowed two sacks and was called for holding once. Kenn was voted second-team All-Pro and voted to his third consecutive Pro Bowl. He was voted as the NFC choice for the NFLPA/Coca-Cola Offensive Lineman of the Year Award for 1981 and 1982.

In 1984, Kenn started all 16 games and was voted second-team All-NFL by the UPI. Kenn's consecutive game-starting streak was broken in 1985 when he had a knee injury that caused him to miss the final games. Kenn rebounded in 1986 to allow just four-and-a-half sacks and was called for only two holding penalties. Head coach Dan Henning said, "He's got the physical gifts, he's bright, and now he has a great deal of experience, "That's the desirable combination."

In 1988 Kenn was called for only one holding penalty and allowed 6½ sacks and was voted as a Pro Bowl Alternate."He is already one of the best offensive tackles of the last ten years, and could become one of the best of all time," said Henning.

In 1991, Kenn shut down the NFL's top sacker and Defensive Player of the Year Pat Swilling, who did not register a sack when facing Kenn. His pass blocking allowed the Falcons to set a team record by giving up only 31 sacks in 531 passing attempts. Kenn only gave up one. For his efforts, he was voted first-team All-Pro by the Associated Press. The following season Kenn was called for one penalty and allowed five sacks and was an alternate to the Pro Bowl. In 1993 and 1994, Kenn remained the Falcons starting left tackle and retired after the 1994 season.

While playing in the NFL, Kenn grew to 286 pounds.

== Later years and honors ==
Kenn was inducted into the National Polish-American Sports Hall of Fame in 2006. In November 2014, Kenn was named a semifinalist for the 2015 Pro Football Hall of Fame class.

In 2021, the Professional Football Researchers Association named Kenn to the PFRA Hall of Very Good Class of 2021.

After his retirement from football, Kenn served as Chairman of the Fulton County Commission.
