= Walt Downing =

American football player (born 1956)

No. 62, 72
- Position: Guard

Personal information
- Born: June 11, 1956 (age 70); Coatesville, Pennsylvania, U.S.
- Listed height: 6 ft 3 in (1.91 m)
- Listed weight: 259 lb (117 kg)

Career information
- High school: Coatesville
- College: Michigan
- NFL draft: 1978: 2nd round, 47th overall pick

Career history
- San Francisco 49ers (1978–1983); Denver Gold (1985)

Awards and highlights
- Super Bowl champion (XVI); PFWA All-Rookie Team (1978); First-team All-American (1977); 2× First-team All-Big Ten (1976, 1977)

Career NFL statistics
- Games played: 83
- Games started: 17
- Fumble recoveries: 1
- Stats at Pro Football Reference

Walt Downing (born June 11, 1956) is an American former professional football player. He played professional football as an offensive guard for the San Francisco 49ers from 1978 to 1983. He played for Bill Walsh and was a member of the 1981 San Francisco 49ers team that won the franchise's first Super Bowl. He also played for the Denver Gold in the USFL. Downing played college football for the Michigan Wolverines under head coach Bo Schembechler from 1975 to 1977. He was a co-captain of their 1977 team and was selected that year as a first-team All-American.

== Early life ==
Downing grew up in Coatesville, Pennsylvania. He attended Coatesville High School, where he was a member of the football, wrestling and track teams. He played on the offensive line and at linebacker for the football team and was selected as a Prep All-American. In track, he threw the shot put and discus. He also won the 1972 Pennsylvania sectional championship as a heavyweight in wrestling. He graduated with academic honors in 1974.

== Michigan ==
Downing accepted a scholarship to play football for Bo Schembechler at the University of Michigan. He was a starting offensive lineman in 36 consecutive games for Michigan from 1975 to 1977, playing for teams that finished in the top ten of the AP and UPI polls each year and played in an Orange Bowl and two Rose Bowls. As a sophomore in 1975, he was a starter at the guard position in all 12 games played by the 1975 Michigan team. The 1975 team played in the 1976 Orange Bowl and finished the season ranked No. 8 in the AP and UPI polls.

As a junior, Downing was the starting center in all 12 games played by the 1976 Michigan team that won the Big Ten Conference championship, advanced to the 1977 Rose Bowl, and finished the season ranked No. 3 in both the AP and UPI Polls. He was selected as a first-team All-Big Ten Conference center after the 1976 season.

As a senior, Downing was a co-captain of the 1977 Michigan team. For the second consecutive season, he was the starting center in all 12 games played by the Michigan team. The team won Michigan's second consecutive conference championship, played in the 1978 Rose Bowl, and finished the season ranked No. 9 and No. 8 in the AP and UPI Polls. He was a starter on Michigan's 1975 and 1976 offensive lines that produced two games in which Michigan had three rushers accumulate 100 yards.

At the end of the 1977 season, Downing was selected as a first-team All-American by UPI, The Sporting News, the American Football Coaches Association, Kodak, and Playboy. Downing was the seventh Michigan center to be selected as a first-team All-American. He was also named the best collegiate offensive lineman by the Touchdown Club of Columbus, Ohio.

== Professional football ==
Downing was selected by the San Francisco 49ers in the second round (47th overall pick) of the 1978 NFL draft. He signed a contract with the 49ers in June 1978. As a rookie in 1978, Downing was a starter in 15 of 16 regular season games for the 49ers. He was named to the UPI's NFL All-Rookie team at the end of the 1978 season. Although he lost his role as a starter in 1979, he appeared in all 16 games for the 49ers during the 1980 season. In 1981, he was a member of the 49ers team that defeated the Cincinnati Bengals in Super Bowl XVI. Downing played six seasons and appeared in 83 games for the 49ers from 1978 to 1983.

In May 1984, the 49ers traded Downing to the San Diego Chargers in exchange for a 1985 draft pick. He opted instead to play in the USFL for the Denver Gold.

== Later life ==
After retiring from football, Downing moved to Massillon, Ohio. As of 2011, he was employed as vice president of sales for Green Lines Transportation, a trucking company in Malvern, Ohio.

Downing's son T. J. Downing played college football for the Ohio State Buckeyes from 2004 to 2006.

In 2011, Downing was inducted into the Chester County Sports Hall of Fame. He had previously been inducted into the Coatesville Hall of Fame and the Coatesville High School Athletic Hall of Fame.

== See also ==
- List of Michigan Wolverines football All-Americans
