= 1976 All-Big Ten Conference football team =

American college football all-star team

The 1976 All-Big Ten Conference football team consists of American football players chosen by various organizations for All-Big Ten Conference teams for the 1976 Big Ten Conference football season.

Seven players were unanimously selected as first-team players by the Associated Press (AP): flanker Jim Smith (Michigan); running backs Scott Dierking (Purdue) and Rob Lytle (Michigan); defensive linemen Bob Brudzinski (Ohio State) and Greg Morton (Michigan); and linebackers Calvin O'Neal (Michigan) and Scott Studwell (Illinois).

The Michigan Wolverines dominated the offensive unit, taking six of eleven places on the first team selected by the Associated Press (AP), including Lytle, Smith, and quarterback Rick Leach. The Ohio State Buckeyes, on the other hand, dominated the defensive unit, taking five of the eleven places on the AP first team, including Brudzinski and linebacker Tom Cousineau.

== Offensive selections ==
=== Quarterbacks ===
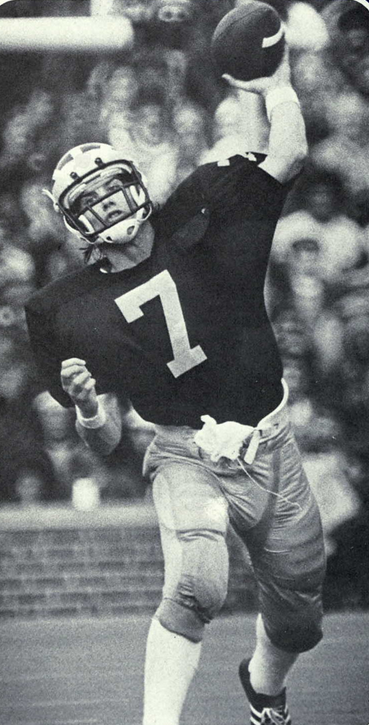
Quarterback Rick Leach

- Rick Leach, Michigan (AP-1; UPI-1)
- Tony Dungy, Minnesota (AP-2; UPI-2)

=== Running backs ===
- Scott Dierking, Purdue (AP-1; UPI-1)
- Rob Lytle, Michigan (AP-1; UPI-1)
- Pete Johnson, Ohio State (AP-2; UPI-2)
- Jeff Logan, Ohio State (AP-2; UPI-2)

=== Flankers ===
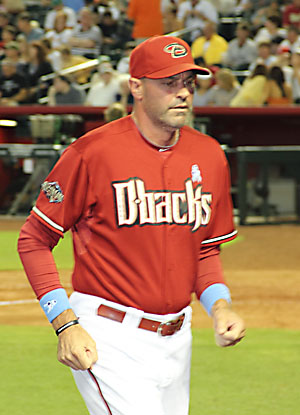
Second-team flanker Kirk Gibson as manager of the Arizona Diamondbacks

- Jim Smith, Michigan (AP-1; UPI-1)
- Kirk Gibson, Michigan State (AP-2; UPI-2)

=== Wide receivers ===
- Scott Yelvington, Northwestern (AP-1; UPI-1)
- Ron Kullas, Minnesota (AP-2)
- David Charles, Wisconsin (UPI-2)

=== Tight ends ===
- Mike Cobb, Michigan State (AP-1; UPI-1)
- Jim Moore, Ohio State (AP-2)
- Gene Johnson, Michigan (UPI-2)

=== Centers ===
- Walt Downing, Michigan (AP-1; UPI-1)
- Al Pitts, Michigan State (AP-2; UPI-2)

=== Guards ===
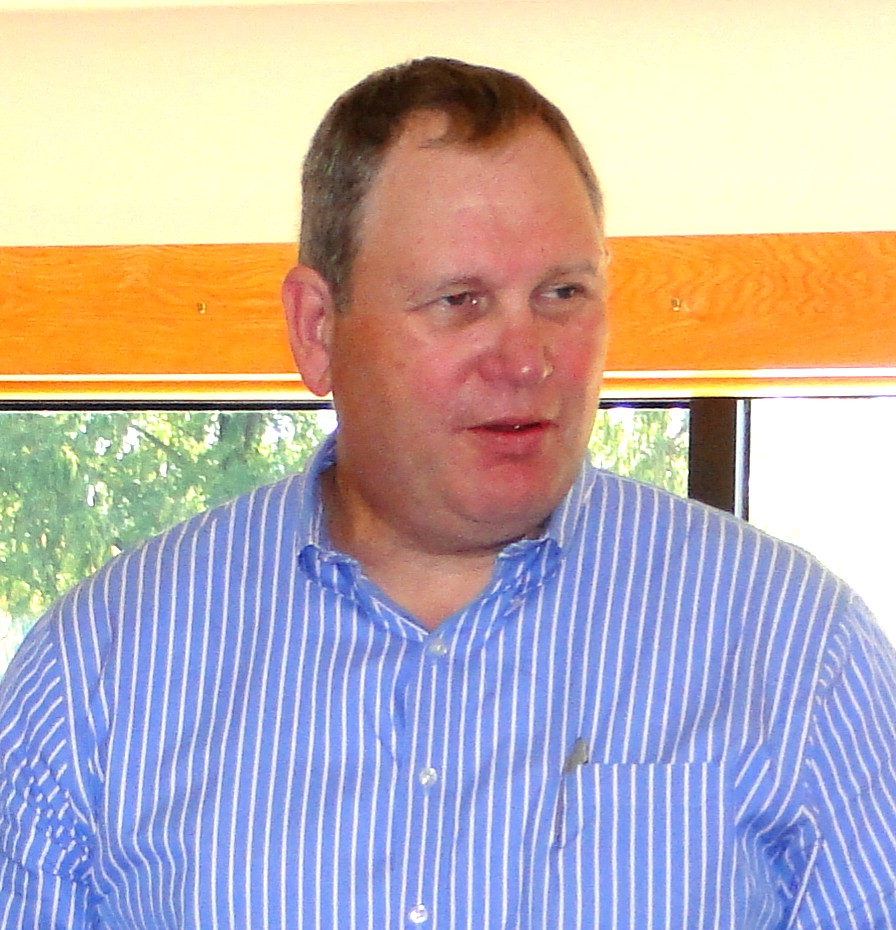
Guard Mark Donahue

- Mark Donahue, Michigan (AP-1; UPI-1)
- Connie Zelencik, Purdue (AP-1; UPI-2)
- Bill Lukens, Ohio State (AP-2; UPI-1)
- Kirk Lewis, Michigan (AP-2)
- Kevin Pancratz, Illinois (UPI-2)

=== Tackles ===
- Bill Dufek, Michigan (AP-1; UPI-1)
- Chris Ward, Ohio State (AP-1; UPI-1)
- Jerry Finis, Illinois (AP-2; UPI-2)
- Tony Bruggenthies, Michigan State (AP-2)
- Mike Kenn, Michigan (UPI-2)

== Defensive selections ==
=== Front five ===
- Aaron Brown, Ohio State (AP-1; UPI-1 [middle guard])
- Bob Brudzinski, Ohio State (AP-1; UPI-1 [def. end])
- Nick Buonomici, Ohio State (AP-1; UPI-1 [def. tackle])
- Greg Morton, Michigan (AP-1; UPI-1 [def. tackle])
- Blane Smith, Purdue (AP-1; UPI-2 [def. end])
- John Anderson, Michigan (AP-2; UPI-1 [def. end])
- Larry Bethea, Michigan State (AP-2; UPI-2 [def. tackle])
- John DiFeliciantonio, Illinois (AP-2)
- Paul Maly, Northwestern (AP-2; UPI-2 [middle guard])
- George Washington, Minnesota (AP-2)
- Otto Smith, Michigan State (UPI-2 [def. end])
- Eddie Beamon, Ohio State (UPI-2 [def. tackle])

=== Linebackers ===
- Calvin O'Neal, Michigan (AP-1; UPI-1)
- Scott Studwell, Illinois (AP-1; UPI-1)
- Tom Cousineau, Ohio State (AP-1)
- Dave Crossen, Wisconsin (AP-2)
- Steve Sanders, Indiana (AP-2)
- Ed Thompson, Ohio State (AP-2; UPI-2)
- Tom Rusk, Iowa (UPI-2)

=== Defensive backs ===
- Ray Griffin, Ohio State (AP-1; UPI-1)
- Pete Shaw, Northwestern (AP-1; UPI-1)
- Tom Hannon, Michigan State (AP-1; UPI-2)
- George Adzick, Minnesota (AP-2; UPI-1)
- Paul Beery, Purdue (AP-2; UPI-1)
- Dwight Hicks, Michigan (AP-2)
- Jim Stauner, Illinois (UPI-2)
- Jim Pickens, Michigan (UPI-2)
- Jerry Zuver, Michigan (UPI-2)

== Special teams ==
=== Placekicker ===
- Dan Beaver, Illinois (AP-1; UPI-1)
- Bob Wood, Michigan (UPI-2)

=== Punter ===
- Tom Skladany, Ohio State (AP-1)

== Key ==
AP = Associated Press

UPI = United Press International, selected by the Big Ten coaches

Bold = Consensus first-team selection of both the AP and UPI

== See also ==
- 1976 College Football All-America Team
