= Mike Hollway =

American football coach

Biographical details
- Born: 1952 or 1953 (age 73–74)
- Education: University of Michigan (1974, 1975)

Coaching career (HC unless noted)
- 1974–1975: Michigan (GA)
- 1976–1982: Augustana (IL) (DC)
- 1983–1986: Marietta
- 1987–2011: Ohio Wesleyan

Head coaching record
- Overall: 146–141–2

Accomplishments and honors

Championships
- 1 NCAC (1989)

Michael Hollway is an American former college football coach. He was the head football coach for Marietta College from 1983 to 1986 and Ohio Wesleyan University from 1987 to 2011. He also coached for Michigan and Augustana (IL).

== Head coaching record ==
Year	Team	Overall	Conference	Standing	Bowl/playoffs
Marietta Pioneers (Ohio Athletic Conference) (1983–1986)
1983	Marietta	0–9	0–5	6th (Red)	
1984	Marietta	1–8–1	0–7–1	9th	
1985	Marietta	4–6	3–5	T–6th	
1986	Marietta	6–4	4–4	5th	
Marietta:		11–27–1	7–21–1		
Ohio Wesleyan Battling Bishops (North Coast Athletic Conference) (1987–2011)
1987	Ohio Wesleyan	5–5	4–2	2nd	
1988	Ohio Wesleyan	6–4	4–2	T–2nd	
1989	Ohio Wesleyan	8–1–1	5–1	T–1st	
1990	Ohio Wesleyan	9–1	7–1	2nd	
1991	Ohio Wesleyan	8–2	6–2	3rd	
1992	Ohio Wesleyan	8–2	6–2	3rd	
1993	Ohio Wesleyan	6–4	6–2	3rd	
1994	Ohio Wesleyan	7–3	6–2	3rd	
1995	Ohio Wesleyan	6–4	6–2	3rd	
1996	Ohio Wesleyan	4–6	3–4	T–4th	
1997	Ohio Wesleyan	4–6	3–4	T–4th	
1998	Ohio Wesleyan	6–4	4–4	5th	
1999	Ohio Wesleyan	8–2	4–2	T–2nd	
2000	Ohio Wesleyan	6–4	4–3	T–3rd	
2001	Ohio Wesleyan	9–1	6–1	T–2nd	
2002	Ohio Wesleyan	5–5	3–4	T–6th	
2003	Ohio Wesleyan	4–6	2–4	T–6th	
2004	Ohio Wesleyan	5–5	5–2	T–2nd	
2005	Ohio Wesleyan	3–7	2–5	8th	
2006	Ohio Wesleyan	3–7	3–4	T–6th	
2007	Ohio Wesleyan	4–6	4–3	T–4th	
2008	Ohio Wesleyan	2–8	2–5	T–7th	
2009	Ohio Wesleyan	3–7	3–4	T–5th	
2010	Ohio Wesleyan	2–8	2–4	T–6th	
2011	Ohio Wesleyan	4–6	3–3	T–4th	
Ohio Wesleyan:		135–114–1	103–72		
Total:		146–141–2			
National championship Conference title Conference division title or championship game berth
