= John Anderson (American football) =

American football player (born 1956)

No. 60, 59
- Position: Linebacker

Personal information
- Born: February 14, 1956 (age 70); Waukesha, Wisconsin, U.S.
- Listed height: 6 ft 3 in (1.91 m)
- Listed weight: 226 lb (103 kg)

Career information
- High school: Waukesha (WI) South
- College: Michigan
- NFL draft: 1978: 1st round, 26th overall pick

Career history
- Green Bay Packers (1978–1989)

Awards and highlights
- NFL 1980s All-Decade Team; PFWA All-Rookie Team (1978); Green Bay Packers Hall of Fame; First-team All-American (1977); 2× First-team All-Big Ten (1976, 1977)

Career NFL statistics
- Sacks: 24.5
- Interceptions: 25
- Touchdowns: 1
- Stats at Pro Football Reference

Roger John Anderson (born February 14, 1956) is an American former professional football player. He was a linebacker for the Green Bay Packers of the National Football League (NFL) for 12 seasons from 1978 to 1989.

Anderson is a native of Waukesha, Wisconsin. He was selected as the Packers' most valuable defensive player for three consecutive years. At the end of his career with the Packers, he was the team's all-time leader in tackles and was tied with Ray Nitschke for the Packers' career record in interceptions by a linebacker. Anderson was named a second-team player on the NFL 1980s All-Decade Team and was inducted into the Green Bay Packers Hall of Fame in 1996.

Anderson also played college football as a linebacker and defensive end for the Michigan Wolverines from 1974 to 1977. He was selected as a first-team All-Big Ten Conference player in 1976 and a first-team All-American in 1977. In 2009, he became the linebackers coach at Carroll University.

== Early life ==
Anderson was born in Waukesha, Wisconsin, in 1956. He attended Waukesha South High School where he played both football and basketball.

== University of Michigan ==
Anderson enrolled at the University of Michigan in 1974 and played college football for head coach Bo Schembechler's Wolverines teams from 1974 to 1977. He was a backup outside linebacker as a freshman in 1974. He was converted to a defensive end in 1975 and started one game at that position.

As a junior, Anderson started 10 games at defensive end for the 1976 Michigan Wolverines football team that compiled a 10-2 and allowed opponents to score only 95 points (7.9 points per game). Anderson contributed to 65 tackles and three interceptions for the 1976 Wolverines. At the end of the 1976 season, Anderson received the team's Frederick Matthei Award. He was also selected as a first-team All-Big Ten Conference player.

As a senior, Anderson was moved to the outside linebacker position where he started all 12 games for the 1977 Michigan team that compiled a 10-2 and allowed opponents to score only 124 points (10.3 points per game). Anderson tallied 73 tackles, one fumble recovery and one interception for the 1977 team. In 1977, he received the team's Meyer Morton Award and was selected by the Football Writers Association of America as a first-team linebacker on the 1977 College Football All-America Team.

== Green Bay Packers ==
Anderson was selected by the Green Bay Packers with their second of two first-round selections (26th overall pick) in the 1978 NFL draft (the Packers' first pick being James Lofton). Anderson signed with the Packers and was selected to the NFL's all rookie team in 1978 after intercepting five passes and registering 102 total tackles in 13 games. After breaking his arm in December 1978, Anderson missed the last three games of the 1978 season. He broke his arm again in training camp in 1979 and missed the first nine games of that season. Despite the early injuries, a sports writer in The Milwaukee Journal in September 1980 wrote that Anderson was the Packers' "best overall athlete", a "complete football player" who "doesn't make mental mistakes" and "has size and speed and strength" and who "possesses all the stuff superstars are made of" except for "color."

Anderson ultimately played 12 seasons with the Packers from 1978 to 1989, appearing in 146 games, 140 of them as a starting linebacker. Anderson was selected as the Packers' most valuable defensive player three consecutive years. He totaled 15 fumble recoveries, 25 interceptions, 167 interception return yards and one interception returned for a touchdown. By the end of Anderson's 12-year career, he was the Packers' all-time leader in tackles with 1,020, and was tied with Ray Nitschke for the Packers' career mark in interceptions by a linebacker.

Anderson was named a second-team player on the NFL 1980s All-Decade Team as selected by voters of the Pro Football Hall of Fame, and he was inducted into the Green Bay Packers Hall of Fame in 1996.

== Later life ==
Upon retirement, Anderson became a sportscaster for WITI in Milwaukee. In 1998, he was hired as a middle school Earth Science teacher at Brookfield Academy in Brookfield, Wisconsin. In 2009, he was hired by Carroll University in Waukesha as the football team's linebackers coach. He retired from teaching at Brookfield Academy in 2017.
