= Howard King (public-address announcer) =

Howard D. King (June 4, 1932 - May 4, 2016) was the public-address announcer of Michigan Stadium (the home stadium of the Michigan Wolverines college football team) for 33 years, from 1972 to 2005. King and his wife, Liz Sayre-King, resided in Traverse City, Michigan, USA.

King died at his home on May 4, 2016, aged 83.
