= Dwight Hicks =

American gridiron football player (born 1956)

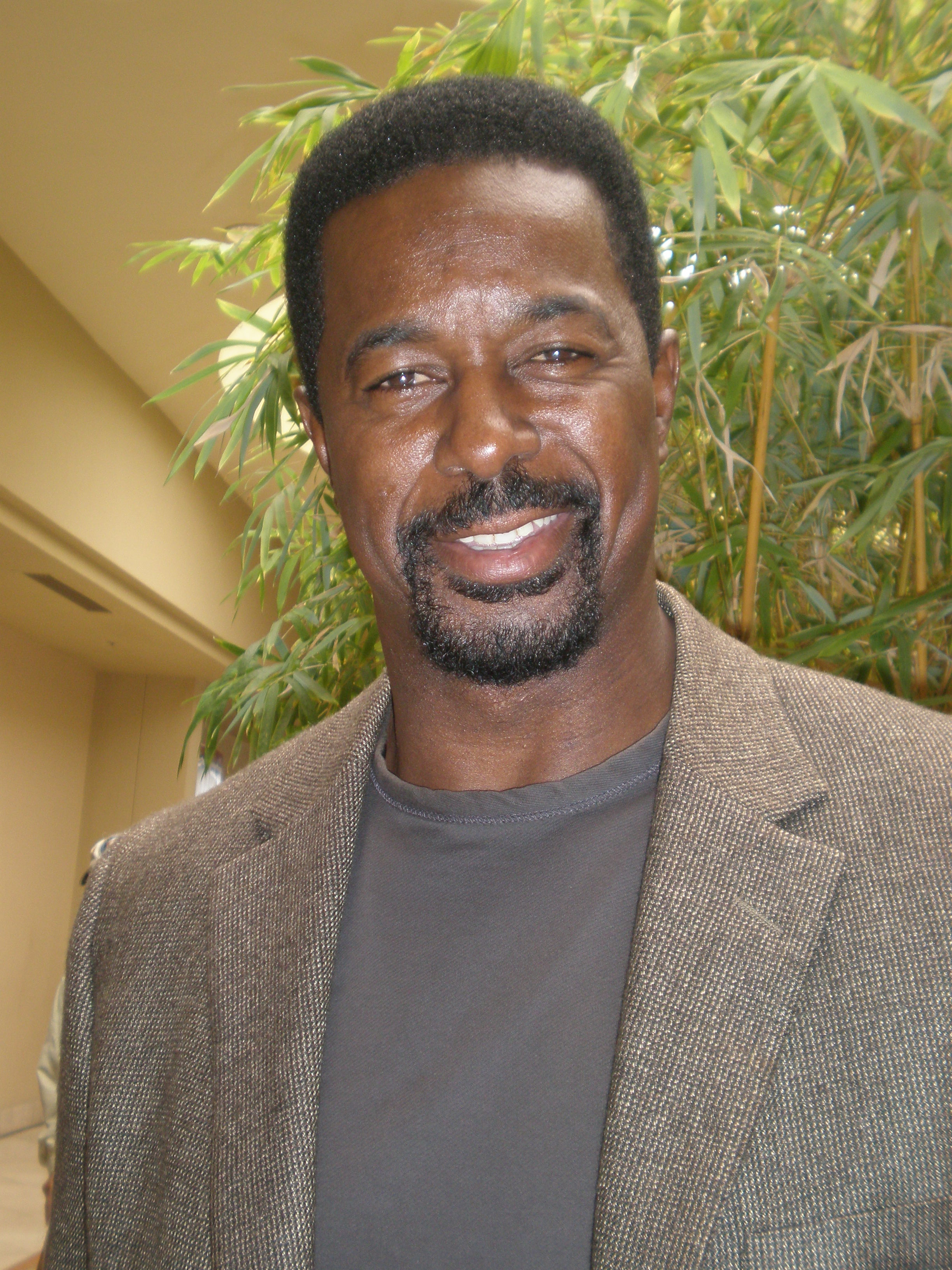
- Hicks in 2008

No. 22, 29
- Position: Safety

Personal information
- Born: April 5, 1956 (age 70); Mount Holly Township, New Jersey, U.S.
- Listed height: 6 ft 1 in (1.85 m)
- Listed weight: 190 lb (86 kg)

Career information
- High school: Pennsauken (NJ)
- College: Michigan
- NFL draft: 1978: 6th round, 150th overall pick

Career history
- Toronto Argonauts (1978); San Francisco 49ers (1979–1985); Indianapolis Colts (1986)

Awards and highlights
- 2× Super Bowl champion (XVI, XIX); Second-team All-Pro (1981); 4× Pro Bowl (1981, 1982, 1983, 1984); Second-team All-American (1977); First-team All-Big Ten (1977); Second-team All-Big Ten (1976)

Career NFL statistics
- Interception: 32
- Interception yards: 602
- Interception return TDs: 3
- Stats at Pro Football Reference

Dwight Hicks (born April 5, 1956) is an American actor and former professional football player who was a safety in the National Football League (NFL), primarily for the San Francisco 49ers. He won two Super Bowls with the 49ers while earning four Pro Bowl selections.

Hicks played college football for the Michigan Wolverines. He began his pro career with the Toronto Argonauts of the Canadian Football League (CFL) in 1978. He played seven seasons with San Francisco from 1979 to 1985, and finished his career with the Indianapolis Colts in 1986.

== High school and college ==
Hicks played high school football at Pennsauken High School in Pennsauken Township, New Jersey, where he led the football team to a 9–1 record in 1972 and a #2 ranking in South Jersey by the Courier-Post. Before his pro career, Hicks played for the University of Michigan in the 1975–1978 seasons where he played safety, punt returner and wolfman.

During his time at the University of Michigan, Hicks claims to have been a victim of sexual assault by athletics physician Dr. Robert Anderson.

== Professional football career ==
Hicks started his professional football career with the CFL's Toronto Argonauts in 1978 playing 3 games as a defensive back and punt returner.

A four-time Pro Bowl selection from 1981 to 1984, Hicks was a key player on the 49ers dynasty in the 1980s, assisting his team to NFL Championship wins in Super Bowl XVI and Super Bowl XIX. In the 1981 season, Hicks tied for third in the NFL in interceptions (9) and led the league in return yards (239), and went on to make a big impact in the Super Bowl against the Cincinnati Bengals. After the 49ers lost a fumble on the opening kickoff, the Bengals had a great scoring opportunity and drove to San Francisco 5-yard line. However, Hicks made a clutch interception to prevent the Bengals from scoring. His interception set up a 49ers touchdown on their ensuing drive and helped San Francisco build up a 20–0 lead at halftime, eventually winning the game 26–21.

Hicks arrived with the 49ers merely by happenstance. Hicks was one of a bevy of defensive backs used by the 49ers during the 1979 and 1980 NFL seasons. Before being signed by the 49ers, John Facenda noted in a team highlight film that Hicks was "Managing a health food store" in Detroit. Hicks, who was interviewed for the America's Game episode focusing on the 49ers Super Bowl XIX champions, notes that Facenda was wrong. Hicks was simply working in the stock room of a health food store at the time of his signing. Only 25 years old, Hicks found himself suddenly the veteran leader of the 49ers secondary in the 1981 season, when the 49ers decided to rebuild their defensive backfield through the draft. Playing in only his second full season, Hicks was considered the leader of a secondary that also featured rookies Ronnie Lott, Eric Wright and Carlton Williamson. The young, but hard-hitting secondary would affectionately be known as "Dwight Hicks and his Hot Licks". Despite this lack of experience, the 49ers defense ranked among the best in the NFL and spurred the 49ers on to a surprising victory in Super Bowl XVI.

Hicks was the Defensive Captain of the 49ers team that won Super Bowl XIX following the 1984 NFL season. Following a last-minute defeat to the Washington Redskins in the 1983 NFC Championship Game, Hicks delivered an impassioned speech to his crestfallen teammates, asking them to "Remember the feeling." Buoyed by Hicks' speech, the 1984 49ers rampaged through the season, finishing with a 15–1 record and breezing through the playoffs en route to a 38–16 victory over the Miami Dolphins in the Super Bowl. Hicks, along with his defensive backfield mates Lott, Wright and Williamson, were all selected to the Pro Bowl that season, only the second time in NFL History that a single team's entire secondary was afforded the honor in a single season.

In his eight NFL seasons, Hicks recorded 32 interceptions, 602 interception return yards, 14 fumble recoveries, 112 fumble return yards, and 4 touchdowns (3 interceptions, 1 fumble return). He also gained 461 yards returning kickoffs and punts. In his single CFL season with the Argonauts, he had 2 interceptions for zero return yards.

=== Acting and television appearances ===
After his football career, Hicks went on to become a popular character actor in films such as The Rock, Jack, Armageddon, and In the Mix. He also made appearances on various television shows, including How I Met Your Mother, Castle, Body of Proof, Cold Case, The Practice, The X-Files, ER and The O.C. He also co-hosted The Point After, a local San Francisco TV program that aired immediately after 49ers Sunday broadcasts on KTVU.

== Personal ==
Hicks is married to costume designer Dana Woods. The couple have two daughters.
