= Rob Lytle =

American football player (1954–2010)

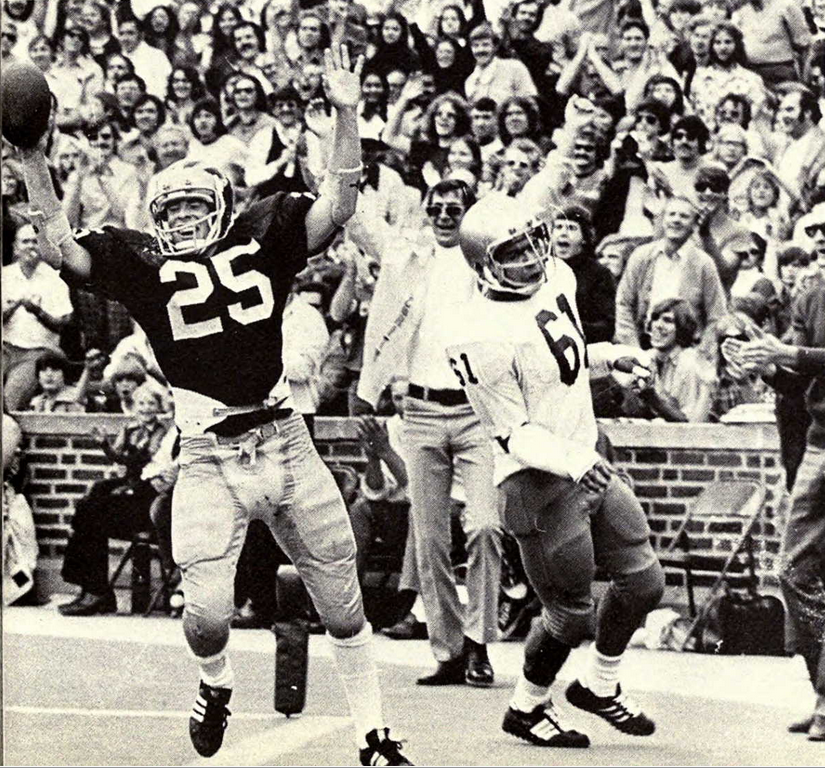
- Lytle scores a Michigan touchdown, 1974

No. 25, 41
- Position: Running back

Personal information
- Born: November 12, 1954; Fremont, Ohio, U.S.
- Died: November 20, 2010 (aged 56); Fremont, Ohio, U.S.
- Listed height: 6 ft 1 in (1.85 m)
- Listed weight: 198 lb (90 kg)

Career information
- High school: Fremont Ross (Fremont, Ohio)
- College: Michigan (1973–1976)
- NFL draft: 1977: 2nd round, 45th overall pick

Career history
- Denver Broncos (1977–1983)

Awards and highlights
- Consensus All-American (1976); Big Ten Most Valuable Player (1976); First-team All-Big Ten (1976)

Career NFL statistics
- Rushing attempts: 376
- Rushing yards: 1,451
- Total TDs: 14
- Stats at Pro Football Reference
- College Football Hall of Fame

Robert William Lytle (November 12, 1954 – November 20, 2010) was an American football running back who played for the Denver Broncos in the National Football League (NFL) for seven seasons.

Lytle played college football for the Michigan Wolverines from 1973 to 1976. He broke Michigan's then career rushing record with 3,317 yards, was the Big Ten Most Valuable Player, and was selected as a consensus first-team All-American in 1976. He was posthumously inducted into the College Football Hall of Fame in 2015.

Lytle was selected in the second round of the 1977 NFL draft, and played for the Broncos until 1983. In his seven seasons, Lytle compiled 1,451 rushing yards, 562 receiving yards and 14 touchdowns.

== Early life ==
Born and raised in Fremont, Ohio, where his family had operated a clothing store for several generations, Lytle graduated from its Ross High School in 1973.

== University of Michigan ==
Lytle enrolled at the University of Michigan in 1973 and played college football as a tailback and fullback for Bo Schembechler's Michigan Wolverines football teams from 1973 to 1976.

As a sophomore in 1974, Lytle was the Wolverines' second leading rusher with 802 yards on 140 carries for an average of 5.7 yards per carry. In 1975, he started at fullback in all 12 games, and was the again the team's second leading rusher with 1,030 yards on 193 carries (average: 5.3 yards).

In his senior season in 1976, Lytle started nine games at fullback and three at tailback for the Big Ten championship team which finished the season at 10–2 and ranked third in the final AP Poll. He led the team with 1,469 rushing yards on 221 carries and 14 rushing touchdowns. A consensus first-team All-American, Lytle was third in the Heisman Trophy balloting, behind winner Tony Dorsett and Ricky Bell.

During three years as a regular player at Michigan, Lytle set the school's career record with 3,307 rushing yards. It was broken five years later by Butch Woolfolk, and he now ranks eighth in rushing yards. Lytle was involved in two games in which Michigan had three rushers accumulate 100 yards, and he was posthumously inducted into the College Football Hall of Fame in 2015.

== Professional football ==
Lytle was selected by the Denver Broncos in the second round (45th overall pick) of the 1977 NFL draft. At the end of his rookie season, he scored Denver's sole touchdown in Super Bowl XII. Lytle holds the distinction of being the first to score a touchdown in both a Rose Bowl and a Super Bowl.

He spent seven seasons in the NFL with the Broncos and rushed for 1,451 yards, caught 61 passes for 562 yards, returned six kickoffs for 99 yards, and scored 14 touchdowns (12 rushing and two receiving).

His son Kelly tells how Michigan Coach Schembechler called him the “toughest player” he had ever coached. “What fans never saw, though, was how Dad was an invalid during the week and transformed into a warrior on Sundays by fixing a cocktail of cortisone, painkillers, adrenaline, and his obsession to play football.”

== Later life ==
Lytle had a heart attack and died at Fremont Memorial Hospital in Fremont, Ohio on November 20, 2010. An autopsy of his brain revealed “moderate to severe” symptoms of the neurodegenerative disease Chronic traumatic encephalopathy (CTE). He is one of at least 345 NFL players to be diagnosed after death with chronic traumatic encephalopathy (CTE), which is caused by repeated hits to the head.

Footage of Lytle with the Denver Broncos was used in the 1988 film Everybody's All-American.
