= Mark Donahue =

American football player (born 1956)

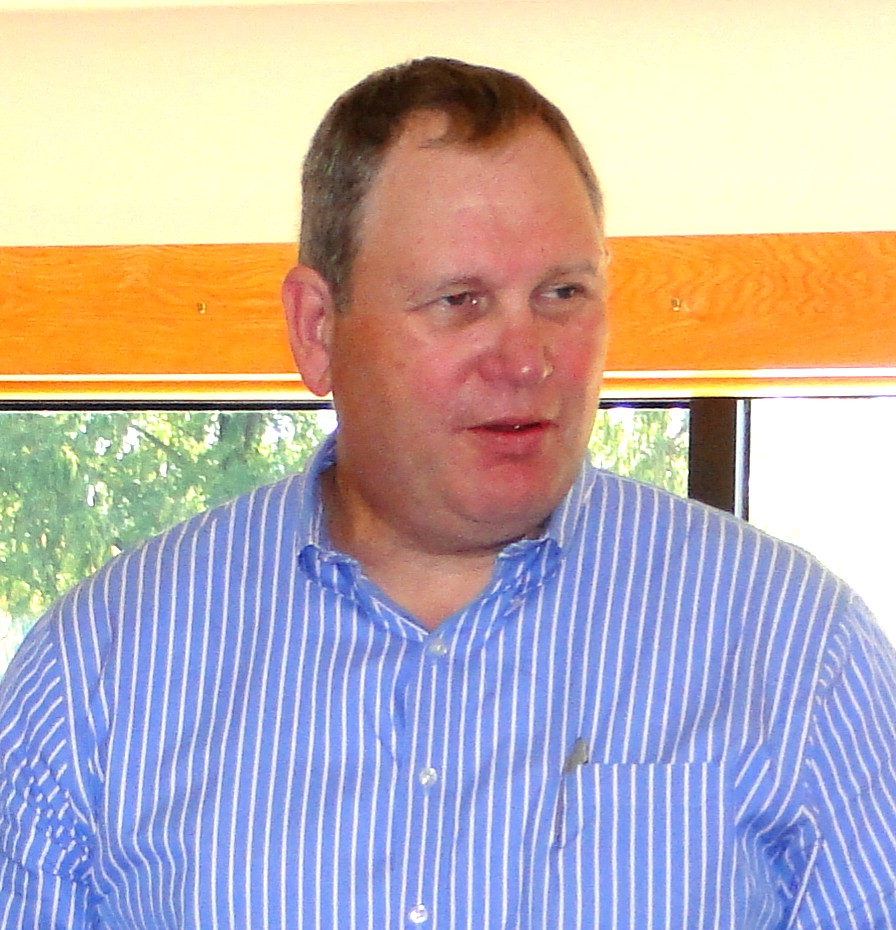

No. 66
- Position: Guard

Personal information
- Born: January 29, 1956 (age 70); Evergreen Park, Illinois, U.S.
- Listed height: 6 ft 3 in (1.91 m)
- Listed weight: 256 lb (116 kg)

Career information
- High school: Brother Rice (Chicago, Illinois)
- College: Michigan
- NFL draft: 1978: 11th round, 294th overall pick

Career history
- Cincinnati Bengals (1978–1979)

Awards and highlights
- Unanimous All-American (1977); Consensus All-American (1976); 2× First-team All-Big Ten (1976, 1977); Second-team All-Big Ten (1975)

Career NFL statistics
- Games played: 31
- Games started: 6
- Fumble recoveries: 1
- Stats at Pro Football Reference

Mark Joseph Donahue (born January 28, 1956) is an American former professional football player who was a guard for the Cincinnati Bengals of the National Football League (NFL). He played college football for the Michigan Wolverines from 1975 to 1977. He was a consensus All-American in 1976 and again in 1977, when he was also a unanimous selection. Donahue also played two seasons in the NFL for the Bengals in 1978 and 1979.

== Early life ==
A native of Oak Lawn, Illinois, Donahue attended Brother Rice High School in the Chicago Catholic League, graduating in 1974.

== University of Michigan ==
Donahue accepted a football scholarship to the University of Michigan and played college football for the Michigan Wolverines football team from 1975 to 1977. He was a starter on Michigan's 1975 and 1976 offensive lines that produced two games in which Michigan had three running backs each accumulated 100 rushing yards. Donahue was selected as a consensus first-team offensive guard on both the 1976 and 1977 College Football All-America Teams. He was the 13th player in Michigan football history to be twice honored as a consensus All-American and was rated by Bo Schembechler as "one of his all-time best linemen."

== Professional football ==
Donahue was selected in the 11th round of the 1978 NFL draft by the Cincinnati Bengals. He played offensive guard for the Bengals in 1978 and 1979. Donahue later recalled: "It was fun playing a couple of years with the Bengals. It was a great experience lining up against legends like Randy White of the Dallas Cowboys and Joe Greene and the Pittsburgh Steelers. The first time you're in a stance against them, you're almost too excited to hit them. You get over that real quick when you realize there is no hesitancy at all on their part on hitting you hard."

== Later years and honors ==
In May 2011, Donahue was inducted into the Chicago Catholic League Hall of Fame. In September 2012, he was inducted into the Chicagoland Sports Hall of Fame. In September 2016, Donahue was inducted into the University of Michigan Hall of Honor. Donahue was named the president of his alma mater Brother Rice High School in 2018.
