= Jim Smith (wide receiver) =

American football player (born 1955)

No. 86
- Positions: Wide receiver, punt returner

Personal information
- Born: July 20, 1955 (age 71); Harvey, Illinois, U.S.
- Listed height: 6 ft 2 in (1.88 m)
- Listed weight: 205 lb (93 kg)

Career information
- High school: Dwight D. Eisenhower (Blue Island, Illinois)
- College: Michigan
- NFL draft: 1977: 3rd round, 75th overall pick

Career history
- Pittsburgh Steelers (1977–1982); Birmingham Stallions (1983–1985); Los Angeles Raiders (1985)

Awards and highlights
- 2× Super Bowl champion (XIII, XIV); First-team All-American (1976); 2× First-team All-Big Ten (1975, 1976)

Career NFL statistics
- Receptions: 113
- Receiving yards: 2,103
- Receiving touchdowns: 25
- Stats at Pro Football Reference

James Arthur Smith (born July 20, 1955) is an American former professional football player who was wide receiver in the National Football League (NFL). He played college football for the Michigan Wolverines from 1974 to 1976. He played in the NFL for six seasons with the Pittsburgh Steelers from 1977 to 1982 before starring on the Birmingham Stallions of the rival United States Football League (USFL). After the USFL's demise, Smith played a final season for the Los Angeles Raiders in 1985.

== Early life ==
Smith grew up in Robbins, Illinois, and attended Dwight D. Eisenhower High School in Blue Island, Illinois, where he earned All-Conference and All-State honors. In his senior year, he led the Eisenhower Cardinals to the South Suburban Conference title.

== University of Michigan ==
Smith was a flanker and wingback for the University of Michigan from 1974 to 1976. In three years at Michigan, he caught 73 passes for 1,687 yards (23.1 yards per reception) and 14 touchdowns. He also returned 51 punts for 525 yards, an average of 10.3 yards per return. He also ran with the ball 56 times for 394 yards, an average of 7.0 yards per carry. On November 8, 1975, in a victory over Purdue, Smith had a career-high 184 receiving yards on five catches, including an 83-yard touchdown that set a record as the longest pass completion in Michigan history. He was selected as a consensus first-team wide receiver on the 1976 College Football All-America Team.

== Professional football ==
Smith was selected by the Pittsburgh Steelers in the third round (75th overall pick) of the 1977 NFL draft. He played for the Steelers from 1977 to 1982, backing up Hall of Famers Lynn Swann and John Stallworth and earning two Super Bowl rings in the process. Smith's best season with the Steelers was 1980 when he caught 37 passes for 711 yards and nine touchdowns. He had another strong year in 1981 with 29 passes for 571 yards and seven touchdowns. In 1982, Smith led the NFL with an average of 22.8 yards per reception. In six years with the Steelers, Smith caught 113 passes for 2,103 yards and 25 touchdowns.

In April 1983, Smith signed a three-year contract to play for the Birmingham Stallions in the newly formed USFL. In order to persuade him to jump to the USFL, Smith was offered a sum greater than any NFL receiver was then making. He led the Stallions in receiving each year from 1983 to 1985. In 1983, he caught 51 passes for 756 yards and three touchdowns. In 1984, he caught 89 passes and led the USFL with 1,481 receiving yards and eight touchdowns. In the USFL's final season, 1985, Smith had his best year as a professional, finishing third in the USFL with 87 catches for 1,322 yards. He also led the USFL's receivers with 20 touchdown receptions. He made both the 1985 USFL all-league team and The Sporting News's 1985 USFL All-Star Team.

== NFL career statistics ==
Legend
	Won the Super Bowl
	Led the league
**Bold**	Career high

=== Regular season ===
Year	Team	Games		Receiving				
Year	Team	GP	GS	Rec	Yds	Avg	Lng	TD
1977	PIT	14	0	4	80	20.0	26	0
1978	PIT	9	0	6	83	13.8	29	2
1979	PIT	**15**	4	17	243	14.3	25	2
1980	PIT	12	**10**	**37**	**711**	19.2	45	**9**
1981	PIT	**15**	3	29	571	19.7	46	7
1982	PIT	8	0	17	387	**22.8**	**51**	4
1985	RAI	6	0	3	28	9.3	14	1
		79	17	113	2,103	18.6	51	25

=== Playoffs ===
Year	Team	Games		Receiving				
Year	Team	GP	GS	Rec	Yds	Avg	Lng	TD
1977	PIT	1	0	0	0	0.0	0	0
1978	PIT	**3**	0	0	0	0.0	0	0
1979	PIT	**3**	0	**4**	**41**	10.3	14	0
1982	PIT	1	0	1	40	**40.0**	**40**	0
		8	0	5	81	16.2	40	0

== See also ==
- Lists of Michigan Wolverines football receiving leaders
