= Tom Seabron =

American football player (1957–2024)

No. 53, 58
- Position: Linebacker

Personal information
- Born: May 24, 1957; Baltimore, Maryland, U.S.
- Died: December 26, 2024 (aged 67); West Bloomfield Township, Michigan, U.S.
- Listed height: 6 ft 3 in (1.91 m)
- Listed weight: 215 lb (98 kg)

Career information
- High school: Cass Technical (Detroit, Michigan)
- College: Michigan
- NFL draft: 1979: 5th round, 111th overall pick

Career history
- San Francisco 49ers (1979–1980); St. Louis Cardinals (1980)

Career NFL statistics
- Sacks: 1
- Fumble recoveries: 2
- Stats at Pro Football Reference

Thomas Hall Seabron Jr. (May 24, 1957 – December 26, 2024) was an American professional football player. He played college football for the University of Michigan from 1975 to 1978 and played in the National Football League (NFL) for the San Francisco 49ers from 1979 to 1980 and St. Louis Cardinals in 1980.

== Early life ==
Seabron was born in Baltimore, Maryland, on May 24, 1957. He attended high school in Detroit, Michigan, at Cass Technical High School.

== University of Michigan ==
Seabron played college football for the Michigan Wolverines football team from 1975 to 1978. He played at the tight end and defensive end positions in 1975 and 1976 and at the outside linebacker position in 1977 and 1978.

== Professional football ==
Seabron was selected by the San Francisco 49ers in the fifth round (111th overall selection) in the 1979 NFL draft. He appeared in 16 games as a linebacker and on special teams for the 49ers in the 1979 and 1980 NFL seasons. Seabron was released by the 49ers in October 1980 after appearing in six games. He signed with the St. Louis Cardinals as a free agent in the first half of December 1980 and appeared in the final two games of the 1980 NFL season for the team. Seabron was released by the Cardinals in August 1981.

== Later life and death ==
Seabron died on December 26, 2024, at the age of 67.
