= 1975 Georgia Tech Yellow Jackets football team =

American college football season

1975 Georgia Tech Yellow Jackets football
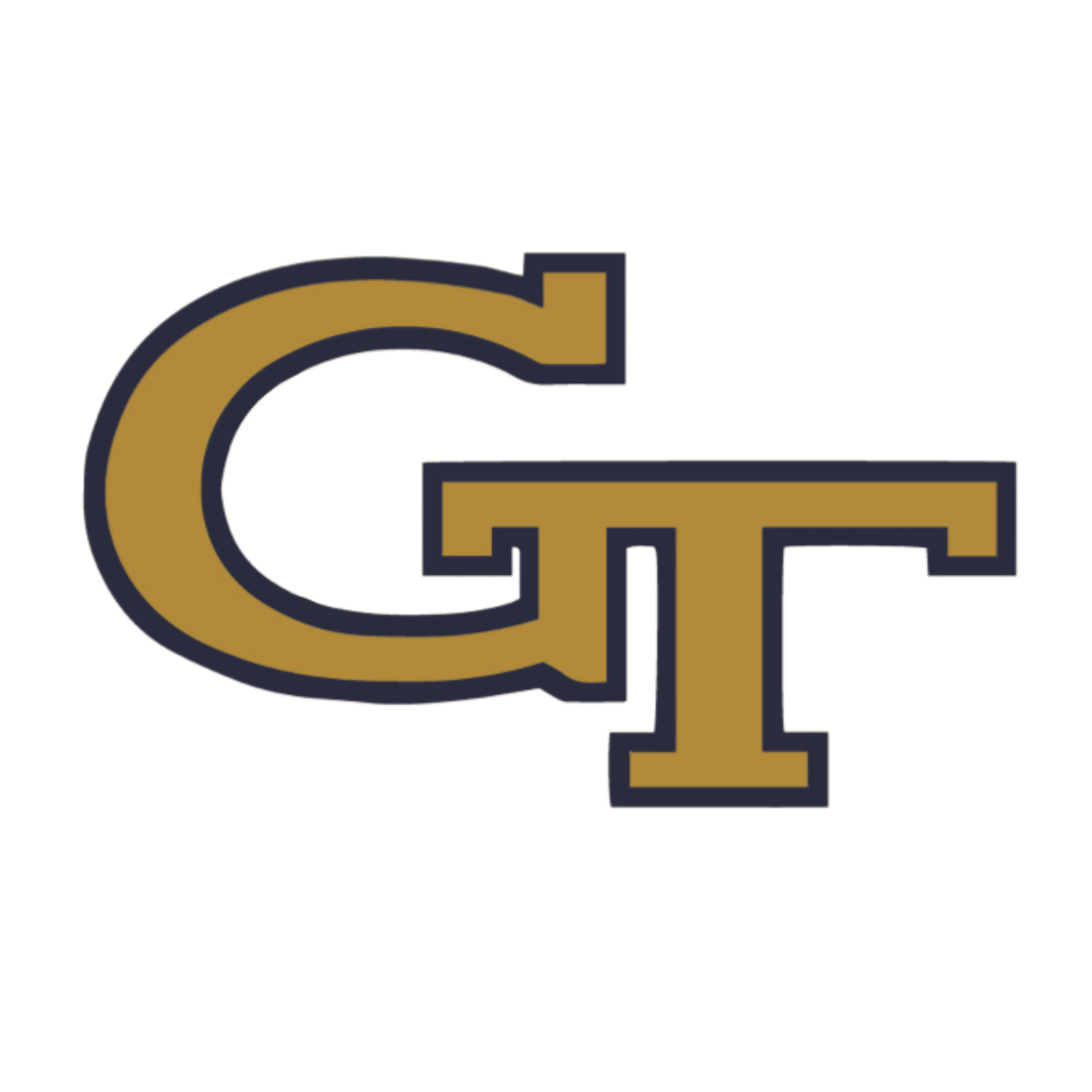
- Conference: Independent
- Record: 7–4
- Head coach: Pepper Rodgers (2nd season)
- Captains: Mark Hunter; Rick Gibney; Steve Crawford
- Home stadium: Grant Field

1975 NCAA Division I independents football records
	Conf.			Overall
Team	W	L	T	W		L		T
Rutgers		–		9	–	2	–	0
No. 10 Penn State		–		9	–	3	–	0
No. 20 West Virginia		–		9	–	3	–	0
Notre Dame		–		8	–	3	–	0
Virginia Tech		–		8	–	3	–	0
No. 15 Pittsburgh		–		8	–	4	–	0
Boston College		–		7	–	4	–	0
Georgia Tech		–		7	–	4	–	0
Memphis State		–		7	–	4	–	0
Navy		–		7	–	4	–	0
North Texas State		–		7	–	4	–	0
Southern Miss		–		7	–	4	–	0
South Carolina		–		7	–	5	–	0
Colgate		–		6	–	4	–	0
Cincinnati		–		6	–	5	–	0
Hawaii		–		6	–	5	–	0
Syracuse		–		6	–	5	–	0
Temple		–		6	–	5	–	0
Utah State		–		6	–	5	–	0
Dayton		–		5	–	6	–	0
Northeast Louisiana		–		4	–	6	–	1
Tulane		–		4	–	7	–	0
Villanova		–		4	–	7	–	0
Florida State		–		3	–	8	–	0
Air Force		–		2	–	8	–	1
Houston		–		2	–	8	–	0
Miami (FL)		–		2	–	8	–	0
Army		–		2	–	9	–	0
Marshall		–		2	–	9	–	0
Southern Illinois		–		1	–	9	–	1
Holy Cross		–		1	–	10	–	0
Louisville		–		1	–	10	–	0
Rankings from AP Poll

The 1975 Georgia Tech Yellow Jackets football team represented the Georgia Institute of Technology as an independent during the 1975 NCAA Division I football season. The Yellow Jackets were led by second-year head coach Pepper Rodgers, and played their home games at Grant Field in Atlanta.

== Schedule ==
Date	Opponent	Site	TV	Result	Attendance	Source
September 13	at South Carolina	Williams–Brice Stadium; Columbia, SC		L 17–23	51,428	
September 20	Miami (FL)	Grant Field; Atlanta, GA		W 38–23	32,334	
September 27	Clemson	Grant Field; Atlanta, GA (rivalry)		W 33–28	46,212–42,282	
October 4	Florida State	Grant Field; Atlanta, GA		W 30–0	35,261	
October 11	VMI	Grant Field; Atlanta, GA		W 38–10	40,194	
October 18	Auburn	Grant Field; Atlanta, GA (rivalry)		L 27–31	58,316	
October 25	at Tulane	Louisiana Superdome; New Orleans, LA		W 23–0	63,333	
November 1	Duke^{†}	Grant Field; Atlanta, GA		W 21–6	44,116	
November 8	at No. 12 Notre Dame	Notre Dame Stadium; Notre Dame, IN (rivalry)		L 3–24	59,075	
November 15	Navy	Grant Field; Atlanta, GA		W 14–13	36,231	
November 27	No. 15 Georgia	Grant Field; Atlanta, GA (Clean, Old-Fashioned Hate)	ABC	L 26–42	55,135	
^{†}Homecoming; Rankings from AP Poll released prior to the game

== Roster ==
- QB #9 Rudy Allen, Sr.
- RB #30 A. Rodriguez Cabarrocas
- WR Steve Raible, Sr.
