= 1975 Connecticut Huskies football team =

American college football season

1975 Connecticut Huskies football
- Conference: Yankee Conference
- Record: 4–7 (3–2 Yankee)
- Head coach: Larry Naviaux (3rd season)
- Offensive coordinator: Rich Johanningmeier (2nd season)
- Home stadium: Memorial Stadium

1975 Yankee Conference football standings
	Conf.					Overall
Team	W		L		T	W		L		T
No. 9 New Hampshire $^	5	–	0	–	0	9	–	3	–	0
UMass	4	–	1	–	0	8	–	2	–	0
Connecticut	3	–	2	–	0	4	–	7	–	0
Boston University	1	–	4	–	0	5	–	6	–	0
Maine	1	–	4	–	0	4	–	6	–	0
Rhode Island	1	–	4	–	0	2	–	8	–	0
$ – Conference champion; ^ – NCAA Division II playoff participant; Rankings from Associated Press poll

The 1975 Connecticut Huskies football team represented the University of Connecticut in the 1975 NCAA Division II football season. The Huskies were led by third-year head coach Larry Naviaux, and completed the season with a record of 4–7.

== Schedule ==
Date	Opponent	Site	Result	Attendance	Source
September 20	at Navy*	Navy–Marine Corps Memorial Stadium; Annapolis, MD	L 7–55	14,521	
September 27	at Yale*	Yale Bowl; New Haven, CT	L 14–35	18,900	
October 4	New Hampshire	Memorial Stadium; Storrs, CT	L 10–14	11,710	
October 11	at No. 9 Delaware*	Delaware Stadium; Newark, DE	L 0–29	15,182	
October 18	at Maine	Alumni Field; Orono, ME	W 14–0	1,800	
October 25	UMass	Memorial Stadium; Storrs, CT (rivalry)	L 14–29	7,019–7,091	
November 1	Rutgers*	Memorial Stadium; Storrs, CT	L 8–35	9,837	
November 7	at Boston University	Nickerson Field; Boston, MA	W 52–10	2,412	
November 15	at Rhode Island	Meade Stadium; Kingston, RI (rivalry)	W 21–10	4,723–4,724	
November 22	Holy Cross*	Memorial Stadium; Storrs, CT	W 35–14	6,813	
November 29	VMI*	Memorial Stadium; Storrs, CT	L 3–13	3,927	
*Non-conference game; Rankings from AP Poll released prior to the game
