= 1975 Maine Black Bears football team =

American college football season

1975 Maine Black Bears football
- Conference: Yankee Conference
- Record: 4–6 (1–4 Yankee)
- Head coach: Walter Abbott (9th season)
- Captain: Alfred Royer
- Home stadium: Alumni Field

1975 Yankee Conference football standings
	Conf.					Overall
Team	W		L		T	W		L		T
No. 9 New Hampshire $^	5	–	0	–	0	9	–	3	–	0
UMass	4	–	1	–	0	8	–	2	–	0
Connecticut	3	–	2	–	0	4	–	7	–	0
Boston University	1	–	4	–	0	5	–	6	–	0
Maine	1	–	4	–	0	4	–	6	–	0
Rhode Island	1	–	4	–	0	2	–	8	–	0
$ – Conference champion; ^ – NCAA Division II playoff participant; Rankings from Associated Press poll

The 1975 Maine Black Bears football team was an American football team that represented the University of Maine as a member of the Yankee Conference during the 1975 NCAA Division II football season. In its ninth season under head coach Walter Abbott, the team compiled a 4–6 record (1–4 against conference opponents) and tied for last place in the Yankee Conference. Alfred Royer was the team captain.

== Schedule ==
Date	Opponent	Site	Result	Attendance	Source
September 13	Boston University*	Alumni Field; Orono, ME	L 21–31	6,453	
September 20	at UMass	Alumni Stadium; Hadley, MA	L 0–10	10,500	
September 27	Bucknell	Alumni Field; Orono, ME	W 17–0	5,300–6,000	
October 4	at Rhode Island	Meade Stadium; Kingston, RI	W 23–14	7,132	
October 11	New Hampshire	Alumni Field; Orono, ME	L 15–24	7,800	
October 18	Connecticut	Alumni Field; Orono, ME	L 0–14	1,800	
October 25	at No. 15 Lehigh	Taylor Stadium; Bethlehem, PA	L 14–51	9,500	
November 1	Southern Connecticut	Alumni Field; Orono, ME	W 33–0	3,200	
November 8	at Delaware	Delaware Stadium; Newark, DE	L 9–35	18,361	
November 15	at Northeastern	Parsons Field; Brookline, MA	W 2–0	3,712	
*Non-conference game; Rankings from AP Poll released prior to the game
