= 1975 Navy Midshipmen football team =

American college football season

1975 Navy Midshipmen football
- Conference: Independent
- Record: 7–4
- Head coach: George Welsh (3rd season)
- Captains: Chet Moeller; Steve Barilich
- Home stadium: Navy–Marine Corps Memorial Stadium

1975 NCAA Division I independents football records
	Conf.			Overall
Team	W	L	T	W		L		T
Rutgers		–		9	–	2	–	0
No. 10 Penn State		–		9	–	3	–	0
No. 20 West Virginia		–		9	–	3	–	0
Notre Dame		–		8	–	3	–	0
Virginia Tech		–		8	–	3	–	0
No. 15 Pittsburgh		–		8	–	4	–	0
Boston College		–		7	–	4	–	0
Georgia Tech		–		7	–	4	–	0
Memphis State		–		7	–	4	–	0
Navy		–		7	–	4	–	0
North Texas State		–		7	–	4	–	0
Southern Miss		–		7	–	4	–	0
South Carolina		–		7	–	5	–	0
Colgate		–		6	–	4	–	0
Cincinnati		–		6	–	5	–	0
Hawaii		–		6	–	5	–	0
Syracuse		–		6	–	5	–	0
Temple		–		6	–	5	–	0
Utah State		–		6	–	5	–	0
Dayton		–		5	–	6	–	0
Northeast Louisiana		–		4	–	6	–	1
Tulane		–		4	–	7	–	0
Villanova		–		4	–	7	–	0
Florida State		–		3	–	8	–	0
Air Force		–		2	–	8	–	1
Houston		–		2	–	8	–	0
Miami (FL)		–		2	–	8	–	0
Army		–		2	–	9	–	0
Marshall		–		2	–	9	–	0
Southern Illinois		–		1	–	9	–	1
Holy Cross		–		1	–	10	–	0
Louisville		–		1	–	10	–	0
Rankings from AP Poll

The 1975 Navy Midshipmen football team represented the United States Naval Academy (USNA) as an independent during the 1975 NCAA Division I football season. Led by third-year head coach George Welsh, the Midshipmen compiled a record of 7–4.

== Schedule ==
Date	Time	Opponent	Site	Result	Attendance	Source
September 13		at Virginia	Scott Stadium; Charlottesville, VA	W 42–14	29,740	
September 20		Connecticut	Navy–Marine Corps Memorial Stadium; Annapolis, MD	W 55–7	14,521	
September 27		at Washington	Husky Stadium; Seattle, WA	L 13–14	53,000	
October 4		vs. Air Force	Robert F. Kennedy Memorial Stadium; Washington, DC (Commander-in-Chief's Trophy)	W 17–0	30,441	
October 11		Syracuse^{†}	Navy–Marine Corps Memorial Stadium; Annapolis, MD	W 10–6	23,003	
October 18		at Boston College	Alumni Stadium; Chestnut Hill, MA	L 3–17	16,227	
October 25		at No. 17 Pittsburgh	Pitt Stadium; Pittsburgh, PA	W 17–0	41,986	
November 1	1:30 p.m.	at No. 15 Notre Dame	Notre Dame Stadium; Notre Dame, IN (rivalry)	L 10–31	59,075	
November 7		at Miami (FL)	Miami Orange Bowl; Miami, FL	W 17–16	18,937	
November 15		at Georgia Tech	Grant Field; Atlanta, GA	L 13–14	36,231	
November 29		vs. Army	John F. Kennedy Stadium; Philadelphia, PA (Army–Navy Game)	W 30–6	81,576	
^{†}Homecoming; Rankings from AP Poll released prior to the game; All times are in Eastern time

== Roster ==
1975 Navy Midshipmen football team roster
Players
Coaches
Offense

Pos.	#	Name	Class
G	75	Steve Barilich (C)	Sr
G	62	Bill Driscoll	Sr
OT	56	Dick Feckler	Sr
C	51	Ray Fritsch	So
WR	20	Mike Galpin	So
RB	43	Gerry Goodwin	So
FB	38	Bob Jackson	Sr
WR	80	Phil McConkey	Fr
WR	34	Ike Owens	Sr
QB	16	Phil Porier	Sr
OT	71	Mark Poston	So
TE	83	Kevin Sullivan	Jr
RB	10	Mike Yeager	Sr

Defense

Pos.	#	Name	Class
LB	44	Andy Bushak	Sr
DL	79	Bob Caulk	Jr
S	45	Gene Ford	Sr
DB	19	Ed Jeter	Sr
DB	48	Chet Moeller (C)	Sr
DT	77	Dave Papak	Sr
DT	61	Jeff Sapp	Jr
DE	53	Jeff Scott	Sr
DE	74	Ken Trass	Jr

Special teams

Pos.	#	Name	Class

Head coach

- George Welsh

Coordinators/assistant coaches

- Len Fontes – Defensive backs

Legend

- (C) Team captain
- (S) Suspended
- (I) Ineligible
- Injured
- Redshirt
