= 1975 Syracuse Orangemen football team =

American college football season

1975 Syracuse Orangemen football
- Conference: Independent
- Record: 6–5
- Head coach: Frank Maloney (2nd season)
- Captain: Ray Preston
- Home stadium: Archbold Stadium

1975 NCAA Division I independents football records
	Conf.			Overall
Team	W	L	T	W		L		T
Rutgers		–		9	–	2	–	0
No. 10 Penn State		–		9	–	3	–	0
No. 20 West Virginia		–		9	–	3	–	0
Notre Dame		–		8	–	3	–	0
Virginia Tech		–		8	–	3	–	0
No. 15 Pittsburgh		–		8	–	4	–	0
Boston College		–		7	–	4	–	0
Georgia Tech		–		7	–	4	–	0
Memphis State		–		7	–	4	–	0
Navy		–		7	–	4	–	0
North Texas State		–		7	–	4	–	0
Southern Miss		–		7	–	4	–	0
South Carolina		–		7	–	5	–	0
Colgate		–		6	–	4	–	0
Cincinnati		–		6	–	5	–	0
Hawaii		–		6	–	5	–	0
Syracuse		–		6	–	5	–	0
Temple		–		6	–	5	–	0
Utah State		–		6	–	5	–	0
Dayton		–		5	–	6	–	0
Northeast Louisiana		–		4	–	6	–	1
Tulane		–		4	–	7	–	0
Villanova		–		4	–	7	–	0
Florida State		–		3	–	8	–	0
Air Force		–		2	–	8	–	1
Houston		–		2	–	8	–	0
Miami (FL)		–		2	–	8	–	0
Army		–		2	–	9	–	0
Marshall		–		2	–	9	–	0
Southern Illinois		–		1	–	9	–	1
Holy Cross		–		1	–	10	–	0
Louisville		–		1	–	10	–	0
Rankings from AP Poll

The 1975 Syracuse Orangemen football team represented Syracuse University as an independent during the 1975 NCAA Division I football season. The team was led by second-year head coach Frank Maloney and played their home games at Archbold Stadium in Syracuse, New York. The team finished with a record of 6–5 and were not invited to a bowl game.

== Schedule ==
Date	Opponent	Site	Result	Attendance	Source
September 13	Villanova	Archbold Stadium; Syracuse, NY	W 24–17	22,867	
September 20	Iowa	Archbold Stadium; Syracuse, NY	W 10–7	19,283	
September 27	at Tulane	Louisiana Superdome; New Orleans, LA	W 31–13	33,200	
October 4	at Maryland	Byrd Stadium; College Park, MD	L 7–24	43,863	
October 11	at Navy	Navy–Marine Corps Memorial Stadium; Annapolis, MD	L 6–10	23,003	
October 18	No. 9 Penn State	Archbold Stadium; Syracuse, NY (rivalry)	L 7–19	28,153	
October 25	Boston College	Archbold Stadium; Syracuse, NY	W 22–14	24,105	
November 1	Pittsburgh	Archbold Stadium; Syracuse, NY (rivalry)	L 0–38	20,065	
November 15	at Virginia	Scott Stadium; Charlottesville, VA	W 37–0	17,250	
November 22	West Virginia	Archbold Stadium; Syracuse, NY (rivalry)	W 20–19	15,336	
November 29	at Rutgers	Rutgers Stadium; Piscataway, NJ	L 10–21	22,000	
Rankings from AP Poll released prior to the game

== Roster ==
1975 Syracuse Orangemen football team roster
Players
Coaches
Offense

Pos.	#	Name	Class
QB	12	James Donoghue	Sr

Defense

Pos.	#	Name	Class
DT	71	Ken Clarke	So
DB	28	Keith Moody	Sr
DB	7	Tim Moresco	Jr
LB	33	Ray Preston	Sr
LB	13	Otis Wilson	Fr

Special teams

Pos.	#	Name	Class

Head coach

- Frank Maloney

Coordinators/assistant coaches

Legend

- (C) Team captain
- (S) Suspended
- (I) Ineligible
- Injured
- Redshirt
