= 1975 Villanova Wildcats football team =

American college football season

1975 Villanova Wildcats football
- Conference: Independent
- Head coach: Dick Bedesem (1st season)
- Captains: Richard Aldrich; Stephen Ebbecke; Stephen Ramsey
- Home stadium: Villanova Stadium

1975 NCAA Division I independents football records
	Conf.			Overall
Team	W	L	T	W		L		T
Rutgers		–		9	–	2	–	0
No. 10 Penn State		–		9	–	3	–	0
No. 20 West Virginia		–		9	–	3	–	0
Notre Dame		–		8	–	3	–	0
Virginia Tech		–		8	–	3	–	0
No. 15 Pittsburgh		–		8	–	4	–	0
Boston College		–		7	–	4	–	0
Georgia Tech		–		7	–	4	–	0
Memphis State		–		7	–	4	–	0
Navy		–		7	–	4	–	0
North Texas State		–		7	–	4	–	0
Southern Miss		–		7	–	4	–	0
South Carolina		–		7	–	5	–	0
Colgate		–		6	–	4	–	0
Cincinnati		–		6	–	5	–	0
Hawaii		–		6	–	5	–	0
Syracuse		–		6	–	5	–	0
Temple		–		6	–	5	–	0
Utah State		–		6	–	5	–	0
Dayton		–		5	–	6	–	0
Northeast Louisiana		–		4	–	6	–	1
Tulane		–		4	–	7	–	0
Villanova		–		4	–	7	–	0
Florida State		–		3	–	8	–	0
Air Force		–		2	–	8	–	1
Houston		–		2	–	8	–	0
Miami (FL)		–		2	–	8	–	0
Army		–		2	–	9	–	0
Marshall		–		2	–	9	–	0
Southern Illinois		–		1	–	9	–	1
Holy Cross		–		1	–	10	–	0
Louisville		–		1	–	10	–	0
Rankings from AP Poll

The 1975 Villanova Wildcats football team represented the Villanova University during the 1975 NCAA Division I football season. The head coach was Dick Bedesem, coaching his first season with the Wildcats. The team played their home games at Villanova Stadium in Villanova, Pennsylvania.

== Schedule ==
Date	Opponent	Site	Result	Attendance	Source
September 6	at No. 17 Maryland	Byrd Stadium; College Park, MD	L 0–41	41,362	
September 13	at Syracuse	Archbold Stadium; Syracuse, NY	L 17–24	22,867	
September 20	Toledo	Villanova Stadium; Villanova, PA	W 14–10	8,500	
September 27	at Army	Michie Stadium; West Point, NY	W 10–0	30,940	
October 4	at Boston College	Alumni Stadium; Chestnut Hill, MA	L 12–41	20,500	
October 18	Marshall	Villanova Stadium; Villanova, PA	W 21–14	6,600	
November 1	Delaware	Villanova Stadium; Villanova, PA (rivalry)	L 13–14	8,900	
November 8	at Youngstown State	Rayen Stadium; Youngstown, OH	L 6–25	6,820	
November 15	at Holy Cross	Fitton Field; Worcester, MA	W 13–12	7,500	
November 22	Boston University	Villanova Stadium; Villanova, PA	L 14–20	5,400	
November 27	Temple	Veterans Stadium; Philadelphia, PA (Mayor's Cup)	L 3–41	6,294	
Rankings from AP Poll released prior to the game
