= 1975 Miami Hurricanes football team =

American college football season

1975 Miami Hurricanes football
- Conference: Independent
- Record: 2–8
- Head coach: Carl Selmer (1st season)
- MVP: Steadman Scavella
- Home stadium: Miami Orange Bowl

1975 NCAA Division I independents football records
	Conf.			Overall
Team	W	L	T	W		L		T
Rutgers		–		9	–	2	–	0
No. 10 Penn State		–		9	–	3	–	0
No. 20 West Virginia		–		9	–	3	–	0
Notre Dame		–		8	–	3	–	0
Virginia Tech		–		8	–	3	–	0
No. 15 Pittsburgh		–		8	–	4	–	0
Boston College		–		7	–	4	–	0
Georgia Tech		–		7	–	4	–	0
Memphis State		–		7	–	4	–	0
Navy		–		7	–	4	–	0
North Texas State		–		7	–	4	–	0
Southern Miss		–		7	–	4	–	0
South Carolina		–		7	–	5	–	0
Colgate		–		6	–	4	–	0
Cincinnati		–		6	–	5	–	0
Hawaii		–		6	–	5	–	0
Syracuse		–		6	–	5	–	0
Temple		–		6	–	5	–	0
Utah State		–		6	–	5	–	0
Dayton		–		5	–	6	–	0
Northeast Louisiana		–		4	–	6	–	1
Tulane		–		4	–	7	–	0
Villanova		–		4	–	7	–	0
Florida State		–		3	–	8	–	0
Air Force		–		2	–	8	–	1
Houston		–		2	–	8	–	0
Miami (FL)		–		2	–	8	–	0
Army		–		2	–	9	–	0
Marshall		–		2	–	9	–	0
Southern Illinois		–		1	–	9	–	1
Holy Cross		–		1	–	10	–	0
Louisville		–		1	–	10	–	0
Rankings from AP Poll

The 1975 Miami Hurricanes football team represented the University of Miami as an independent during the 1975 NCAA Division I football season. Led by first-year head coach Carl Selmer, the Hurricanes played their home games at the Miami Orange Bowl in Miami, Florida. Miami finished the season with a record of 2–8.

== Schedule ==
Date	Opponent	Site	Result	Attendance	Source
September 20	at Georgia Tech	Grant Field; Atlanta, GA	L 23–38	32,339	
September 26	No. 1 Oklahoma	Miami Orange Bowl; Miami, FL	L 17–20	37,203	
October 4	at No. 4 Nebraska	Memorial Stadium; Lincoln, NE (rivalry)	L 16–31	76,231	
October 10	No. 13 Colorado	Miami Orange Bowl; Miami, FL	L 10–23	18,901	
October 17	Houston	Miami Orange Bowl; Miami, FL	W 24–20	15,362	
November 1	at Boston College	Alumni Stadium; Chestnut Hill, MA	L 7–21	25,331	
November 7	Navy	Miami Orange Bowl; Miami, FL	L 16–17	18,937	
November 15	at Florida State	Doak Campbell Stadium; Tallahassee, FL (rivalry)	W 24–22	30,228	
November 22	Notre Dame	Miami Orange Bowl; Miami, FL (rivalry)	L 9–32	24,676	
November 29	No. 13 Florida	Miami Orange Bowl; Miami, FL (rivalry)	L 11–15	25,462	
Rankings from AP Poll released prior to the game

== Roster ==
1975 Miami Hurricanes football team roster
Players
Coaches
Offense

Pos.	#	Name	Class
RB	47	Ottis Anderson	Fr
WR	84	Rick Bernstein	Jr
OT	72	Larry Brown	So
RB	48	Ken Johnson	Fr

Defense

Pos.	#	Name	Class
DB	28	Mike Archer	Jr
DE	92	Gary Dunn	Sr
DE	73	Eddie Edwards	Jr
DB	37	Ernie Jones	Sr
DT	79	Don Latimer	So
DT	75	Don Smith	Fr
DB	26	John Turner	So

Special teams

Pos.	#	Name	Class

Head coach

- Carl Selmer

Coordinators/assistant coaches

- Dave Elliott – Graduate assistant

Legend

- (C) Team captain
- (S) Suspended
- (I) Ineligible
- Injured
- Redshirt
