= 1975 Lehigh Engineers football team =

American college football season

1975 Lehigh Engineers football

Lambert Cup

NCAA Division II Quarterfinal, L 21–35 vs. New Hampshire
- Conference: Independent
- Record: 9–3
- Head coach: Fred Dunlap (11th season)
- Offensive coordinator: John Whitehead (7th season)
- Captains: Jerry Mullane; Joe Sterrett
- Home stadium: Taylor Stadium

1975 NCAA Division II independents football records
	Conf.			Overall
Team	W	L	T	W		L		T
No. 2 Northern Michigan ^		–		13	–	1	–	0
American International		–		8	–	1	–	0
Lehigh ^		–		9	–	3	–	0
Delaware		–		8	–	3	–	0
Portland State		–		8	–	3	–	0
Akron		–		7	–	4	–	0
Kentucky State		–		7	–	4	–	0
UNLV		–		7	–	4	–	0
Santa Clara		–		6	–	5	–	0
Tennessee State		–		5	–	4	–	0
Youngstown State		–		5	–	4	–	0
Chattanooga		–		5	–	5	–	1
Bucknell		–		5	–	5	–	0
Indiana State		–		5	–	5	–	0
Lafayette		–		5	–	5	–	0
Southern Connecticut State		–		5	–	5	–	0
Central Connecticut		–		4	–	5	–	0
Central State (OH)		–		4	–	6	–	0
Eastern Michigan		–		4	–	6	–	0
Eastern Illinois		–		3	–	5	–	2
Northeastern		–		3	–	6	–	0
Western Carolina		–		3	–	7	–	0
Nevada		–		3	–	8	–	0
Nebraska–Omaha		–		2	–	9	–	0
Arkansas–Pine Bluff		–		0	–	11	–	0
^ – NCAA Division II playoff participant; Rankings from AP Poll

The 1975 Lehigh Engineers football team was an American football team that represented Lehigh University as an independent during the 1975 NCAA Division II football season. Lehigh lost in the quarterfinal round of the national playoffs, but won the Lambert Cup.

In their 11th and final year under head coach Fred Dunlap, the Engineers compiled a 9–3 record (9–2 in the regular season). Jerry Mullane and Joe Sterrett were the team captains.

Unranked at the start of the year, the Engineers first appeared in the 1975 Division II national polls in late October, climbing to No. 4 in the coaches poll before a late-season loss to Bucknell dropped them to No. 6, their final coaches poll position. In the AP writers poll, Lehigh ended the regular season ranked No. 11, but the final poll was released after the playoffs, and Lehigh did not rank in the top 15.

Lehigh won the Lambert Cup, awarded to the best team from a mid-sized college in the East. The Engineers also qualified for its second NCAA Division II national playoff in three years, but lost in the first round to No. 8 New Hampshire.

Lehigh played its home games, including its playoff game, at Taylor Stadium on the university campus in Bethlehem, Pennsylvania.

== Schedule ==
Date	Opponent	Rank	Site	Result	Attendance	Source
September 13	Millersville		Taylor Stadium; Bethlehem, PA	W 27–18	9,500	
September 20	at Army		Michie Stadium; West Point, NY	L 32–54	27,800–27,872	
September 27	Penn		Taylor Stadium; Bethlehem, PA	W 34–23	14,000	
October 4	at Gettysburg		Musselman Stadium; Gettysburg, PA	W 56–22	3,500	
October 11	Rutgers		Taylor Stadium; Bethlehem, PA	W 34–20	11,500	
October 18	at No. 9 Delaware		Delaware Stadium; Newark, DE (rivalry)	W 35–23	21,100–21,105	
October 25	Maine	No. 10	Taylor Stadium; Bethlehem, PA	W 21–14	9,500	
November 1	Colgate	No. 7	Taylor Stadium; Bethlehem, PA	W 38–6	15,000	
November 8	at Davidson	No. 5	Richardson Stadium; Davidson, NC	W 37–19	3,000	
November 15	at Bucknell	No. 4	Memorial Stadium; Lewisburg, PA	L 25–32	7,500	
November 22	Lafayette	No. 6	Taylor Stadium; Bethlehem, PA (The Rivalry)	W 40–14	17,000–17,300	
November 29	No. 8 New Hampshire	No. 6	Taylor Stadium; Bethlehem, PA (NCAA Division II Quarterfinal)	L 21–35	9,100	
Rankings from UPI Division II Coaches Poll
