= 1975 Louisville Cardinals football team =

American college football season

1975 Louisville Cardinals football
- Conference: Independent
- Record: 2–9
- Head coach: Vince Gibson (1st season)
- Home stadium: Fairgrounds Stadium

1975 NCAA Division I independents football records
	Conf.			Overall
Team	W	L	T	W		L		T
Rutgers		–		9	–	2	–	0
No. 10 Penn State		–		9	–	3	–	0
No. 20 West Virginia		–		9	–	3	–	0
Notre Dame		–		8	–	3	–	0
Virginia Tech		–		8	–	3	–	0
No. 15 Pittsburgh		–		8	–	4	–	0
Boston College		–		7	–	4	–	0
Georgia Tech		–		7	–	4	–	0
Memphis State		–		7	–	4	–	0
Navy		–		7	–	4	–	0
North Texas State		–		7	–	4	–	0
Southern Miss		–		7	–	4	–	0
South Carolina		–		7	–	5	–	0
Colgate		–		6	–	4	–	0
Cincinnati		–		6	–	5	–	0
Hawaii		–		6	–	5	–	0
Syracuse		–		6	–	5	–	0
Temple		–		6	–	5	–	0
Utah State		–		6	–	5	–	0
Dayton		–		5	–	6	–	0
Northeast Louisiana		–		4	–	6	–	1
Tulane		–		4	–	7	–	0
Villanova		–		4	–	7	–	0
Florida State		–		3	–	8	–	0
Air Force		–		2	–	8	–	1
Houston		–		2	–	8	–	0
Miami (FL)		–		2	–	8	–	0
Army		–		2	–	9	–	0
Marshall		–		2	–	9	–	0
Southern Illinois		–		1	–	9	–	1
Holy Cross		–		1	–	10	–	0
Louisville		–		1	–	10	–	0
Rankings from AP Poll

The 1975 Louisville Cardinals football team was an American football team that represented the University of Louisville as an independent during the 1975 NCAA Division I football season. In their first season under head coach Vince Gibson, the Cardinals compiled a 1–10 record and were outscored by a total of 316 to 148.

The team's statistical leaders included John Darling with 946 passing yards, Walter Peacock with 1,013 rushing yards and 36 points scored, and Tony Smith with 382 receiving yards.

== Schedule ==
Date	Opponent	Site	Result	Attendance	Source
September 13	Western Kentucky	Fairgrounds Stadium; Louisville, KY	L 17–21	34,700	
September 20	at Drake	Drake Stadium; Des Moines, IA	L 7–31	8,120	
September 27	Cincinnati	Fairgrounds Stadium; Louisville, KY (The Keg of Nails)	L 27–46	13,867	
October 4	at Wichita State	Cessna Stadium; Wichita, KS	L 10–13		
October 11	Chattanooga	Fairgrounds Stadium; Louisville, KY	W 6–3	9,056	
October 18	at Memphis State	Liberty Bowl Memorial Stadium; Memphis, TN (rivalry)	L 7–41		
October 25	Mississippi State	Fairgrounds Stadium; Louisville, KY	W 14–28 (Miss. State forfeit)	8,636	
November 1	at Tulsa	Skelly Field; Tulsa, OK	L 14–38	14,500	
November 8	Dayton	Fairgrounds Stadium; Louisville, KY	L 13–32	9,888	
November 15	at Northeast Louisiana	Brown Stadium; Monroe, LA	L 10–14		
November 22	at West Texas State	Kimbrough Memorial Stadium; Canyon, TX	L 23–49	4,500	

== Roster ==
1975 Louisville Cardinals football team roster
Players
Coaches
Offense

Pos.	#	Name	Class
QB	14	Jim Didier	Fr
WR	3	Kevin Miller	So
RB	20	Nathan Poole	Fr

Defense

Pos.	#	Name	Class

Special teams

Pos.	#	Name	Class
P	79	Wilbur Summers	So

Head coach

- Vince Gibson

Coordinators/assistant coaches

Legend

- (C) Team captain
- (S) Suspended
- (I) Ineligible
- Injured
- Redshirt
