= 1975 Notre Dame Fighting Irish football team =

American college football season

1975 Notre Dame Fighting Irish football
- Conference: Independent

Ranking
- Coaches: No. 17
- Record: 8–3
- Head coach: Dan Devine (1st season)
- Offensive coordinator: Merv Johnson (1st season)
- Captains: Ed Bauer; Jim Stock
- Home stadium: Notre Dame Stadium

1975 NCAA Division I independents football records
	Conf.			Overall
Team	W	L	T	W		L		T
Rutgers		–		9	–	2	–	0
No. 10 Penn State		–		9	–	3	–	0
No. 20 West Virginia		–		9	–	3	–	0
Notre Dame		–		8	–	3	–	0
Virginia Tech		–		8	–	3	–	0
No. 15 Pittsburgh		–		8	–	4	–	0
Boston College		–		7	–	4	–	0
Georgia Tech		–		7	–	4	–	0
Memphis State		–		7	–	4	–	0
Navy		–		7	–	4	–	0
North Texas State		–		7	–	4	–	0
Southern Miss		–		7	–	4	–	0
South Carolina		–		7	–	5	–	0
Colgate		–		6	–	4	–	0
Cincinnati		–		6	–	5	–	0
Hawaii		–		6	–	5	–	0
Syracuse		–		6	–	5	–	0
Temple		–		6	–	5	–	0
Utah State		–		6	–	5	–	0
Dayton		–		5	–	6	–	0
Northeast Louisiana		–		4	–	6	–	1
Tulane		–		4	–	7	–	0
Villanova		–		4	–	7	–	0
Florida State		–		3	–	8	–	0
Air Force		–		2	–	8	–	1
Houston		–		2	–	8	–	0
Miami (FL)		–		2	–	8	–	0
Army		–		2	–	9	–	0
Marshall		–		2	–	9	–	0
Southern Illinois		–		1	–	9	–	1
Holy Cross		–		1	–	10	–	0
Louisville		–		1	–	10	–	0
Rankings from AP Poll

The 1975 Notre Dame Fighting Irish football team was an American football team that represented the University of Notre Dame as an independent during the 1975 NCAA Division I football season. In their first year under head coach Dan Devine, the Irish compiled an 8–3 record, outscored opponents by a total of 244 to 144, and were ranked No. 17 in the final UPI poll. In their only game against a ranked opponent, they lost to No. 3 USC. The team's victory over Georgia Tech is featured in the 1993 film Rudy.

Defensive tackle Steve Niehaus was a unanimous first-team pick on the 1975 All-America college football team. Tight end Ken MacAfee also received first-team All-America honors from the United Press International. The team's statistical leaders included quarterbacks Rick Slager (686 passing yards) and Joe Montana (507 passing yards), running backs Jerome Heavens (756 rushing yards) and Al Hunter (558 rushing yards), MacAfee (26 receptions for 333 yards), placekicker Dave Reeve (57 points on 24 of 26 PAT and 11 of 16 field goals), and Niehaus (113 tackles).

The team played its home games at Notre Dame Stadium in Notre Dame, Indiana.

== Schedule ==
Date	Time	Opponent	Rank	Site	TV	Result	Attendance	Source
September 15	9:00 p.m.	vs. Boston College	No. 9	Schaefer Stadium; Foxboro, MA (Holy War)	ABC	W 17–3	61,501	
September 20	2:30 p.m.	at Purdue	No. 9	Ross–Ade Stadium; West Lafayette, IN (rivalry)		W 17–0	69,795	
September 27	2:30 p.m.	Northwestern	No. 7	Notre Dame Stadium; Notre Dame, IN (rivalry)		W 31–7	59,075	
October 4	2:30 p.m.	Michigan State	No. 8	Notre Dame Stadium; Notre Dame, IN (rivalry)		L 3–10	59,075	
October 11	1:30 p.m.	at North Carolina	No. 15	Kenan Memorial Stadium; Chapel Hill, NC (rivalry)		W 21–14	49,500	
October 18	3:05 p.m.	at Air Force	No. 15	Falcon Stadium; Colorado Springs, CO (rivalry)		W 31–30	43,204	
October 25	1:50 p.m.	No. 3 USC	No. 14	Notre Dame Stadium; Notre Dame, IN (rivalry)	ABC	L 17–24	59,075	
November 1	1:30 p.m.	Navy	No. 15	Notre Dame Stadium; Notre Dame, IN (rivalry)		W 31–10	59,075	
November 8	1:30 p.m.	Georgia Tech	No. 12	Notre Dame Stadium; Notre Dame, IN (rivalry)		W 24–3	59,075	
November 15	1:30 p.m.	at Pittsburgh	No. 9	Pitt Stadium; Pittsburgh, PA (rivalry)		L 20–34	56,480	
November 22	7:30 p.m.	at Miami (FL)		Miami Orange Bowl; Miami, FL (rivalry)		W 32–9	24,676	
Rankings from AP Poll released prior to the game; All times are in Eastern time

== Game summaries ==
=== Boston College ===
Team	1	2	3	4	Total
• Notre Dame	0	3	7	7	17
Boston College	0	3	0	0	3

- Date: September 15
- Location: Schaefer Stadium, Foxboro, MA
- Game attendance: 61,501
- TV announcers (ABC): Keith Jackson, Bud Wilkinson

Scoring summary
2	6:52	ND	Dave Reeve 30-yard field goal	ND 3-0
2	0:11	BC	Fred Steinfort 45-yard field goal	Tied 3-3
3	1:48	ND	Jim Browner 10-yard run (kick good)	ND 10-3
4		ND	Touchdown	ND 17-3

=== Purdue ===
Team	1	2	3	4	Total
• Notre Dame	3	0	0	14	17
Purdue	0	0	0	0	0

- Date: September 20
- Location: Ross–Ade Stadium • West Lafayette, Indiana

Scoring summary
1	ND	Reeve 29-yard field goal	Notre Dame 3-0
4	ND	Bradley 99-yard interception return (Reeve kick)	Notre Dame 10-0
4	ND	Hunter 1-yard run (Reeve kick)	Notre Dame 17-0

=== North Carolina ===
Team	1	2	3	4	Total
• Notre Dame	0	0	0	21	21
North Carolina	0	0	14	0	14

- Date: October 11
- Location: Kenan Stadium, Chapel Hill, NC
- Game attendance: 49,500

Scoring summary
3		UNC	Voight 12-yard run (Biddle kick)	UNC 7-0
3		UNC	Collins 38-yard pass from Paschall (Biddle kick)	UNC 14-0
4		ND	Hunter 2-yard run (pass failed)	UNC 14-6
4		ND	Hunter 2-yard run (Montana to Bush pass)	Tied 14-14
4	1:03	ND	Burgmeier 80-yard pass from Montana (McLaughlin kick)	ND 21-14

=== Georgia Tech ===
This was the famous game in which Rudy Ruettiger, a 5'6", 165-lb, walk-on, was inserted late in the game and recorded a quarterback sack. His story was the inspiration for the movie Rudy.

Team	1	2	3	4	Total
Georgia Tech	0	0	0	3	3
• Notre Dame	7	7	3	7	24

- Date: November 8
- Location: South Bend, IN

Scoring summary
1	ND	Heavens 16-yard run (Reeve kick)	ND 7-0
2	ND	FG Reeve 29	ND 10-0
3	ND	Heavens 73-yard run (Reeve kick)	ND 17-0
4	GT	FG Mealier 40	17-3
4	ND	Knotter 3-yard run (Reeve kick)	ND 24-3

== Personnel ==
=== Coaching staff ===
- Head coach: Dan Devine
- Assistants: Greg Blache (JV), Brian Boulac (OL), Ed Chlebek (ST), Merv Johnson (OC), George Kelly (LB), Hank Kuhlmann (OB/ST), Johnny Roland (Receivers), Paul Shoults (DB), Ross Stephenson (Scouting/Volunteer Ast), Joe Yonto (DL)

=== Roster ===
1975 Notre Dame Fighting Irish football team roster
Players
Coaches
Offense

Pos.	#	Name	Class
QB	12	Frank Allocco	Sr
OT	68	Ed Bauer	Sr
TE	83	Doug Buth	Jr
TE	87	John Driscoll	So
RB	40	Terry Eurick	So
WR	82	Kris Haines	Fr
RB	30	Jerome Heavens	Fr
RB	25	Al Hunter	So
OT	62	Dave Huffman	Fr
G	65	Ernie Hughes	So
WR	80	Dan Kelleher	Jr
RB	21	Dan Knott	So
TE	81	Ken MacAfee	So
OT	71	Steve McDaniels	So
G	60	Howard Meyer	Fr
QB	3	Joe Montana	Fr
G	57	Elton Moore	Jr
RB	14	Steve Orsini	So
FB	36	Tom Parise	Sr
C	77	Steve Quehl	Sr
OT	50	Bob Tull	So
G	66	Al Wujciak	Sr

Defense

Pos.	#	Name	Class
DT	79	Jay Achterhoff	Sr
SS	20	Luther Bradley	So
SS	33	Jim Browner	Fr
DE	89	Ross Browner	So
SS	28	Ross Christensen	So
LB	24	Nick DeCicco	So
DT	72	Ken Dike	So
FS	41	John Dubenetzky	Jr
LB	42	Tom Eastman	Jr
DE	94	Willie Fry	So
LB	55	Bob Golic	Fr
FS	10	Randy Harrison	So
LB	58	Steve Heimkreiter	Fr
LB	51	Pete Johnson	So
CB	26	Tom Lopienski	Sr
DT	70	Steve Niehaus	Sr
LB	38	Tony Novakov	Sr
LB	54	Marv Russell	Jr
DE	45	Rudy Ruettiger	Sr
CB	29	Pat Sarb	Sr
LB	48	Jim Stock	Sr
DT	74	Jeff Weston	So

Special teams

Pos.	#	Name	Class
P	4	Tony Brantley	Sr
K	99	Pat McLaughlin	Sr
P/QB	7	Joe Restic	Fr

Head coach

- Dan Devine

Coordinators/assistant coaches

Legend

- (C) Team captain
- (S) Suspended
- (I) Ineligible
- Injured
- Redshirt
