= 1975 Virginia Tech Gobblers football team =

American college football season

1975 Virginia Tech Gobblers football
- Conference: Independent
- Record: 8–3
- Head coach: Jimmy Sharpe (2nd season)
- Defensive coordinator: Charley Pell (2nd season)
- Home stadium: Lane Stadium

1975 NCAA Division I independents football records
	Conf.			Overall
Team	W	L	T	W		L		T
Rutgers		–		9	–	2	–	0
No. 10 Penn State		–		9	–	3	–	0
No. 20 West Virginia		–		9	–	3	–	0
Notre Dame		–		8	–	3	–	0
Virginia Tech		–		8	–	3	–	0
No. 15 Pittsburgh		–		8	–	4	–	0
Boston College		–		7	–	4	–	0
Georgia Tech		–		7	–	4	–	0
Memphis State		–		7	–	4	–	0
Navy		–		7	–	4	–	0
North Texas State		–		7	–	4	–	0
Southern Miss		–		7	–	4	–	0
South Carolina		–		7	–	5	–	0
Colgate		–		6	–	4	–	0
Cincinnati		–		6	–	5	–	0
Hawaii		–		6	–	5	–	0
Syracuse		–		6	–	5	–	0
Temple		–		6	–	5	–	0
Utah State		–		6	–	5	–	0
Dayton		–		5	–	6	–	0
Northeast Louisiana		–		4	–	6	–	1
Tulane		–		4	–	7	–	0
Villanova		–		4	–	7	–	0
Florida State		–		3	–	8	–	0
Air Force		–		2	–	8	–	1
Houston		–		2	–	8	–	0
Miami (FL)		–		2	–	8	–	0
Army		–		2	–	9	–	0
Marshall		–		2	–	9	–	0
Southern Illinois		–		1	–	9	–	1
Holy Cross		–		1	–	10	–	0
Louisville		–		1	–	10	–	0
Rankings from AP Poll

The 1975 Virginia Tech Gobblers football team was an American football team that represented Virginia Tech as an independent during the 1975 NCAA Division I football season. In their second year under head coach Jimmy Sharpe, the Gobblers compiled an overall record of 8–3.

== Schedule ==
Date	Opponent	Site	Result	Attendance	Source
September 13	at Kentucky	Commonwealth Stadium; Lexington, KY	L 8–27	56,616	
September 20	at Kent State	Dix Stadium; Kent, OH	L 11–17	13,871	
September 27	Richmond	Lane Stadium; Blacksburg, VA	W 21–9	30,000	
October 4	at Auburn	Jordan–Hare Stadium; Auburn, AL	W 23–16	45,000	
October 11	Florida State	Lane Stadium; Blacksburg, VA	W 13–10	37,000	
October 18	Virginia	Lane Stadium; Blacksburg, VA (rivalry)	W 24–17	41,000	
October 25	at West Virginia	Mountaineer Field; Morgantown, WV (rivalry)	L 7–10	29,670	
November 1	vs. William & Mary	Foreman Field; Norfolk, VA (Oyster Bowl)	W 24–7	28,000	
November 8	at Houston	Houston Astrodome; Houston, TX	W 34–28	17,000	
November 15	VMI	Lane Stadium; Blacksburg, VA (rivalry)	W 33–0	32,000	
November 22	Wake Forest	Lane Stadium; Blacksburg, VA	W 40–10	29,000	

== Roster ==
1975 Virginia Tech Hokies football team roster
Players
Coaches
Offense

Pos.	#	Name	Class
FB	44	Paul Adams	Sr
QB	12	Mitcheal Barnes	Jr
RB	45	Morris Blueford	Sr
C	54	Blair Buskirk	Jr
G	58	Larry Capps	Jr
RB	2	Roscoe Coles	So
OT	62	Allen Cure	Sr
OT	72	Rondal Davis	Jr
TE	81	Kevin Dick	Sr
TE	87	David Dolphin	So
RB	29	Moses Foster	Jr
WR	8	Stephen Galloway	Sr
OT	54	Keith Gibson	Jr
RB	32	George Heath	Jr
C	50	Mike Heizer	So
FB	30	Tony Houff	Jr
WR	86	Jerry Inge	Sr
RB	33	Billy King	Jr
OL	75	Wayne Moon	Fr
QB	14	Greg Mullinax	Sr
WR	83	Jay Neal	Sr
RB	27	Chuck Nuttycombe	Jr
OL	65	Stuart Patterson	So
G	74	Steve Philbrick	Sr
RB	40	Phil Rogers	Sr
OL	68	Leonard Walker	Fr

Defense

Pos.	#	Name	Class
CB	41	Dale Babione	So
DT	77	Tom Beasley	Jr
FS	15	Henry Bradley	So
DE	90	Larry Blunt	Jr
LB	64	Steve Cannon	So
DL	71	Rickie Casey	Fr
CB	48	Tom Cooper	Jr
CB	28	Flash Davis	Sr
DE	37	David DeHart	So
DL	70	Michel Faulkner	Fr
CB	88	Billy Hardee	Sr
SS	26	Rick Harman	So
DL	73	Bill Houseright	So
LB	59	Scott Hurd	So
FS	13	David Lamie	Fr
DL	52	Curt Lowery	Jr
DE	91	Keith McCarter	Jr
DE	92	Stuart Patterson	Jr
SS	22	Chuck Perdue	Sr
LB	38	Rick Razzano	So
DT	67	Larry Schmidt	So
LB	35	Steve Scott	So
SS	24	Gary Smith	Fr
LB	61	Mike Stollings	Fr
LB	53	Doug Thacker	Sr

Special teams

Pos.	#	Name	Class
K	7	Wayne Latimer	Sr
P	5	Bruce McDaniel	Sr

Head coach

- Jimmy Sharpe

Coordinators/assistant coaches

Legend

- (C) Team captain
- (S) Suspended
- (I) Ineligible
- Injured
- Redshirt
