= 1975 Florida State Seminoles football team =

American college football season

1975 Florida State Seminoles football
- Conference: Independent
- Record: 3–8
- Head coach: Darrell Mudra (2nd season)
- Offensive coordinator: Gary Grouwinkel (1st season)
- Defensive coordinator: Pete Rodriguez (2nd season)
- Captains: Greg Johnson; Jeff Gardner
- Home stadium: Doak Campbell Stadium

1975 NCAA Division I independents football records
	Conf.			Overall
Team	W	L	T	W		L		T
Rutgers		–		9	–	2	–	0
No. 10 Penn State		–		9	–	3	–	0
No. 20 West Virginia		–		9	–	3	–	0
Notre Dame		–		8	–	3	–	0
Virginia Tech		–		8	–	3	–	0
No. 15 Pittsburgh		–		8	–	4	–	0
Boston College		–		7	–	4	–	0
Georgia Tech		–		7	–	4	–	0
Memphis State		–		7	–	4	–	0
Navy		–		7	–	4	–	0
North Texas State		–		7	–	4	–	0
Southern Miss		–		7	–	4	–	0
South Carolina		–		7	–	5	–	0
Colgate		–		6	–	4	–	0
Cincinnati		–		6	–	5	–	0
Hawaii		–		6	–	5	–	0
Syracuse		–		6	–	5	–	0
Temple		–		6	–	5	–	0
Utah State		–		6	–	5	–	0
Dayton		–		5	–	6	–	0
Northeast Louisiana		–		4	–	6	–	1
Tulane		–		4	–	7	–	0
Villanova		–		4	–	7	–	0
Florida State		–		3	–	8	–	0
Air Force		–		2	–	8	–	1
Houston		–		2	–	8	–	0
Miami (FL)		–		2	–	8	–	0
Army		–		2	–	9	–	0
Marshall		–		2	–	9	–	0
Southern Illinois		–		1	–	9	–	1
Holy Cross		–		1	–	10	–	0
Louisville		–		1	–	10	–	0
Rankings from AP Poll

The 1975 Florida State Seminoles football team represented Florida State University as an independent during the 1975 NCAA Division I football season. Led by head coach Darrell Mudra in his second season, the Seminoles finished the season with a record of 3–8. The Seminoles would not have a worse start to a season until 2024.

== Schedule ==
Date	Opponent	Site	Result	Attendance	Source
September 13	at Texas Tech	Jones Stadium; Lubbock, TX	L 20–31	35,268	
September 20	Utah State	Doak Campbell Stadium; Tallahassee, FL	W 17–8	28,685	
September 27	Iowa State	Doak Campbell Stadium; Tallahassee, FL	L 6–10	29,333	
October 4	at Georgia Tech	Grant Field; Atlanta, GA	L 0–30	35,261	
October 11	at Virginia Tech	Lane Stadium; Blacksburg, VA	L 10–13	37,000	
October 18	at No. 14 Florida	Florida Field; Gainesville, FL (rivalry)	L 8–34	64,401	
October 25	Auburn	Doak Campbell Stadium; Tallahassee, FL	L 14–17	39,344	
November 1	at Clemson	Memorial Stadium; Clemson, SC (rivalry)	W 43–7	31,080	
November 8	Memphis State	Doak Campbell FL; Tallahassee, FL	L 14–17	26,041	
November 15	Miami (FL)	Doak Campbell Stadium; Tallahassee, FL (rivalry)	L 22–24	30,228	
November 22	at Houston	Houston Astrodome; Houston, TX	W 33–22	13,244	
Rankings from AP Poll released prior to the game
