= 1975 Pittsburgh Panthers football team =

American college football season

1975 Pittsburgh Panthers football

Sun Bowl champion

Sun Bowl, W 33–19 vs. Kansas
- Conference: Independent

Ranking
- Coaches: No. 13
- AP: No. 15
- Record: 8–4
- Head coach: Johnny Majors (3rd season)
- Offensive coordinator: George Haffner (3rd season)
- Offensive scheme: Veer, I formation
- Defensive coordinator: Jackie Sherrill (3rd season)
- Base defense: Basic 50
- Home stadium: Pitt Stadium

1975 NCAA Division I independents football records
	Conf.			Overall
Team	W	L	T	W		L		T
Rutgers		–		9	–	2	–	0
No. 10 Penn State		–		9	–	3	–	0
No. 20 West Virginia		–		9	–	3	–	0
Notre Dame		–		8	–	3	–	0
Virginia Tech		–		8	–	3	–	0
No. 15 Pittsburgh		–		8	–	4	–	0
Boston College		–		7	–	4	–	0
Georgia Tech		–		7	–	4	–	0
Memphis State		–		7	–	4	–	0
Navy		–		7	–	4	–	0
North Texas State		–		7	–	4	–	0
Southern Miss		–		7	–	4	–	0
South Carolina		–		7	–	5	–	0
Colgate		–		6	–	4	–	0
Cincinnati		–		6	–	5	–	0
Hawaii		–		6	–	5	–	0
Syracuse		–		6	–	5	–	0
Temple		–		6	–	5	–	0
Utah State		–		6	–	5	–	0
Dayton		–		5	–	6	–	0
Northeast Louisiana		–		4	–	6	–	1
Tulane		–		4	–	7	–	0
Villanova		–		4	–	7	–	0
Florida State		–		3	–	8	–	0
Air Force		–		2	–	8	–	1
Houston		–		2	–	8	–	0
Miami (FL)		–		2	–	8	–	0
Army		–		2	–	9	–	0
Marshall		–		2	–	9	–	0
Southern Illinois		–		1	–	9	–	1
Holy Cross		–		1	–	10	–	0
Louisville		–		1	–	10	–	0
Rankings from AP Poll

The 1975 Pittsburgh Panthers football team represented the University of Pittsburgh as an independent during the 1975 NCAA Division I football season. Led by third-year head coach Johnny Majors, the Panthers compiled a record of 8–4 with a win in the Sun Bowl over Kansas. The team played home games at Pitt Stadium in Pittsburgh.

== Schedule ==
Date	Time	Opponent	Rank	Site	TV	Result	Attendance	Source
September 6	2:00 p.m.	at Georgia		Sanford Stadium; Athens, GA		W 19–9	38,500	
September 20	1:30 p.m.	at No. 1 Oklahoma	No. 15	Oklahoma Memorial Stadium; Norman, OK		L 10–46	70,286	
September 27	1:30 p.m.	William & Mary		Pitt Stadium; Pittsburgh, PA		W 47–0	31,022	
October 4	1:30 p.m.	Duke		Pitt Stadium; Pittsburgh, PA		W 14–0	33,778	
October 11	1:30 p.m.	at Temple		Veterans Stadium; Philadelphia, PA		W 55–6	10,791	
October 18	1:30 p.m.	at Army		Michie Stadium; West Point, NY		W 52–20	41,195	
October 25	1:30 p.m.	Navy^{†}	No. 17	Pitt Stadium; Pittsburgh, PA		L 0–17	41,986	
November 1	1:30 p.m.	at Syracuse		Archbold Stadium; Syracuse, NY (rivalry)		W 38–0	20,065	
November 8	1:30 p.m.	at West Virginia	No. 20	Mountaineer Field; Morgantown, WV (Backyard Brawl)	ABC	L 14–17	35,298	
November 15	1:30 p.m.	No. 9 Notre Dame		Pitt Stadium; Pittsburgh, PA (rivalry)		W 34–20	56,480	
November 22	1:30 p.m.	No. 10 Penn State	No. 17	Three Rivers Stadium; Pittsburgh, PA (rivalry)	ABC	L 6–7	46,846	
December 26	12:00 p.m.	vs. No. 19 Kansas	No. 20	Sun Bowl; El Paso, TX (Sun Bowl)	CBS	W 33–19	30,272	
^{†}Homecoming; Rankings from AP Poll released prior to the game; All times are in Eastern time

== Roster ==
1975 Pittsburgh Panthers football team roster
Players
Coaches
Offense

Pos.	#	Name	Class
C	67	Tom Brzoza	So
QB	12	Matt Cavanaugh	So
TE	81	James Corbett	Jr
RB	33	Tony Dorsett	Jr
WR	24	Gordon Jones	Fr
WR	19	Randy Reutershan	So
WR	29	Willie Taylor	So

Defense

Pos.	#	Name	Class
LB	55	Al Chesley	Fr
DT	75	Ed Gallagher	Fr
DE	70	Randy Holloway	So
DE	60	Cecil Johnson	Jr
CB	31	Bob Jury	So
DT	78	David Logan	Fr
DT	68	Don Parrish	Jr
DE	85	Tom Perko	Sr
DE	91	Al Romano	Jr
CB	21	J.C. Wilson	So

Special teams

Pos.	#	Name	Class
P	41	Larry Swider	Jr

Head coach

- Johnny Majors

Coordinators/assistant coaches

- Jackie Sherrill – Assistant head coach, defensive coordinator
- George Haffner – Offensive coordinator
- Henry Lee Parker – Recruiter
- Joe Avezzano – Offensive line
- Jim Dyar – Defensive line
- Larry Holton – Junior varsity
- Harry Jones – Offensive backs
- Bob Leahy – Receivers
- Joe Madden – Defensive secondary
- Bobby Roper – Defensive ends
- Bob Matey – Scouting, middle guards
- Keith Schroeder – Scouting

Legend

- (C) Team captain
- (S) Suspended
- (I) Ineligible
- Injured
- Redshirt

== Team players drafted into the NFL ==
Player	Position	Round	Pick	NFL club
Tom Perko	Linebacker	4	101	Green Bay Packers
Karl Farmer	Wide receiver	7	193	Atlanta Falcons
Randy Cozens	Defensive end	17	474	Denver Broncos
