= 1975 Memphis State Tigers football team =

American college football season

1975 Memphis State Tigers football
- Conference: Independent
- Record: 7–4
- Head coach: Richard Williamson (1st season)
- Offensive coordinator: Jim Ragland (1st season)
- Captains: Jerry Dandridge; Lum Wright
- Home stadium: Liberty Bowl Memorial Stadium

1975 NCAA Division I independents football records
	Conf.			Overall
Team	W	L	T	W		L		T
Rutgers		–		9	–	2	–	0
No. 10 Penn State		–		9	–	3	–	0
No. 20 West Virginia		–		9	–	3	–	0
Notre Dame		–		8	–	3	–	0
Virginia Tech		–		8	–	3	–	0
No. 15 Pittsburgh		–		8	–	4	–	0
Boston College		–		7	–	4	–	0
Georgia Tech		–		7	–	4	–	0
Memphis State		–		7	–	4	–	0
Navy		–		7	–	4	–	0
North Texas State		–		7	–	4	–	0
Southern Miss		–		7	–	4	–	0
South Carolina		–		7	–	5	–	0
Colgate		–		6	–	4	–	0
Cincinnati		–		6	–	5	–	0
Hawaii		–		6	–	5	–	0
Syracuse		–		6	–	5	–	0
Temple		–		6	–	5	–	0
Utah State		–		6	–	5	–	0
Dayton		–		5	–	6	–	0
Northeast Louisiana		–		4	–	6	–	1
Tulane		–		4	–	7	–	0
Villanova		–		4	–	7	–	0
Florida State		–		3	–	8	–	0
Air Force		–		2	–	8	–	1
Houston		–		2	–	8	–	0
Miami (FL)		–		2	–	8	–	0
Army		–		2	–	9	–	0
Marshall		–		2	–	9	–	0
Southern Illinois		–		1	–	9	–	1
Holy Cross		–		1	–	10	–	0
Louisville		–		1	–	10	–	0
Rankings from AP Poll

The 1975 Memphis State Tigers football team represented Memphis State University (now known as the University of Memphis) as an independent during the 1975 NCAA Division I football season. In its first season under head coach Richard Williamson, the team compiled an 7–4 record and outscored opponents by a total of 180 to 168. The team played its home games at Liberty Bowl Memorial Stadium in Memphis, Tennessee.

The team's statistical leaders included Lloyd Patterson with 371 passing yards, Terdell Middleton with 586 rushing yards and 42 points scored, and Ricky Rivas with 224 receiving yards.

== Schedule ==
Date	Opponent	Site	Result	Attendance	Source
September 6	Mississippi State	Memphis Memorial Stadium; Memphis, TN	L 7–17	45,919	
September 13	at No. 7 Auburn	Jordan–Hare Stadium; Auburn, AL	W 31–20	55,000	
September 20	at Cincinnati	Nippert Stadium; Cincinnati, OH (rivalry)	L 3–13		
September 27	Arkansas State	Memphis Memorial Stadium; Memphis, TN	L 10–29	27,669	
October 4	North Texas State	Memphis Memorial Stadium; Memphis, TN	W 21–19	15,418	
October 11	Southern Miss	Memphis Memorial Stadium; Memphis, TN (Black and Blue Bowl)	L 7–21	17,337	
October 18	Louisville	Memphis Memorial Stadium; Memphis, TN (rivalry)	W 41–7		
October 25	at Tulsa	Skelly Stadium; Tulsa, OK	W 16–14	20,000	
November 1	at Wichita State	Cessna Stadium; Wichita, KS	W 13–7	8,854	
November 8	at Florida State	Doak Campbell Stadium; Tallahassee, FL	W 17–14	26,041	
November 15	Houston	Memphis Memorial Stadium; Memphis, TN	W 14–7	22,630	
Rankings from AP Poll released prior to the game
