= 1975 Air Force Falcons football team =

American college football season

1975 Air Force Falcons football
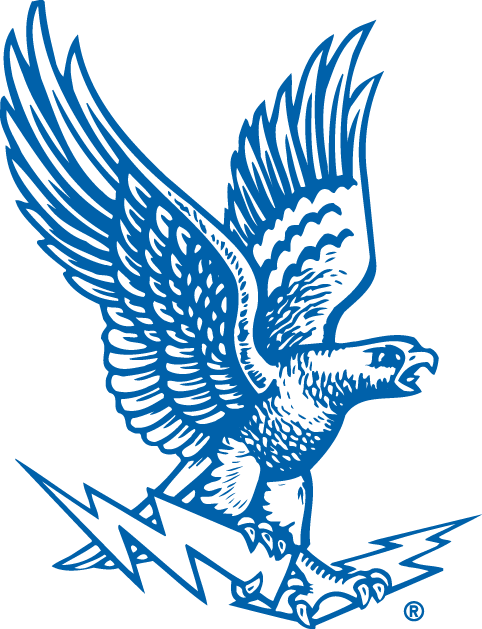
- Conference: Independent
- Record: 2–8–1
- Head coach: Ben Martin (18th season)
- Captains: Chris Milodragovich; Randy Spetman
- Home stadium: Falcon Stadium

1975 NCAA Division I independents football records
	Conf.			Overall
Team	W	L	T	W		L		T
Rutgers		–		9	–	2	–	0
No. 10 Penn State		–		9	–	3	–	0
No. 20 West Virginia		–		9	–	3	–	0
Notre Dame		–		8	–	3	–	0
Virginia Tech		–		8	–	3	–	0
No. 15 Pittsburgh		–		8	–	4	–	0
Boston College		–		7	–	4	–	0
Georgia Tech		–		7	–	4	–	0
Memphis State		–		7	–	4	–	0
Navy		–		7	–	4	–	0
North Texas State		–		7	–	4	–	0
Southern Miss		–		7	–	4	–	0
South Carolina		–		7	–	5	–	0
Colgate		–		6	–	4	–	0
Cincinnati		–		6	–	5	–	0
Hawaii		–		6	–	5	–	0
Syracuse		–		6	–	5	–	0
Temple		–		6	–	5	–	0
Utah State		–		6	–	5	–	0
Dayton		–		5	–	6	–	0
Northeast Louisiana		–		4	–	6	–	1
Tulane		–		4	–	7	–	0
Villanova		–		4	–	7	–	0
Florida State		–		3	–	8	–	0
Air Force		–		2	–	8	–	1
Houston		–		2	–	8	–	0
Miami (FL)		–		2	–	8	–	0
Army		–		2	–	9	–	0
Marshall		–		2	–	9	–	0
Southern Illinois		–		1	–	9	–	1
Holy Cross		–		1	–	10	–	0
Louisville		–		1	–	10	–	0
Rankings from AP Poll

The 1975 Air Force Falcons football team represented the United States Air Force Academy as an independent during the 1975 NCAA Division I football season. Led by 18th-year head coach Ben Martin, the Falcons compiled a record of 2–8–1 and were outscored by their opponents 265–156. Air Force played their home games at Falcon Stadium in Colorado Springs, Colorado.

== Schedule ==
Date	Opponent	Site	Result	Attendance	Source
September 13	at Arkansas	War Memorial Stadium; Little Rock, AR	L 0–35	53,500	
September 20	at Iowa State	Cyclone Stadium; Ames, IA	L 12–17	42,000	
September 27	No. 10 UCLA	Falcon Stadium; Colorado Springs, CO	T 20–20	33,390	
October 4	vs. Navy	Robert F. Kennedy Memorial Stadium; Washington, DC (Commander-in-Chief's Trophy)	L 0–17	30,441	
October 11	at BYU	Cougar Stadium; Provo, UT	L 14–28	30,246	
October 18	No. 15 Notre Dame	Falcon Stadium; Colorado Springs, CO (rivalry)	L 30–31	43,204	
October 25	at Colorado State	Hughes Stadium; Fort Collins, CO (rivalry)	L 10–47	20,058	
November 1	Army	Falcon Stadium; Colorado Springs, CO (Commander-in-Chief's Trophy)	W 33–3	37,183	
November 8	at Tulane	Louisiana Superdome; New Orleans, LA	W 13–12	31,790	
November 15	No. 15 California	Falcon Stadium; Colorado Springs, CO	L 14–31	35,770	
November 22	Wyoming	Falcon Stadium; Colorado Springs, CO	L 10–24	31,913	
Rankings from AP Poll released prior to the game

== Roster ==
1975 Air Force Falcons football team roster
Players
Coaches
Offense

Pos.	#	Name	Class
TE	85	Tom Cox	Sr
WR	89	John Frozena	Sr
FB	40	Chris Milodragovich	Sr
QB	10	Mike Worden

Defense

Pos.	#	Name	Class

Special teams

Pos.	#	Name	Class

Head coach

- Ben Martin

Coordinators/assistant coaches

Legend

- (C) Team captain
- (S) Suspended
- (I) Ineligible
- Injured
- Redshirt

== NFL draft ==
The following Falcon was selected in the 1976 NFL draft following the season.

Round	Pick	Player	Position	NFL team
16	444	Dave Lawson	Kicker	New York Giants
