= 1975 Houston Cougars football team =

American college football season

1975 Houston Cougars football
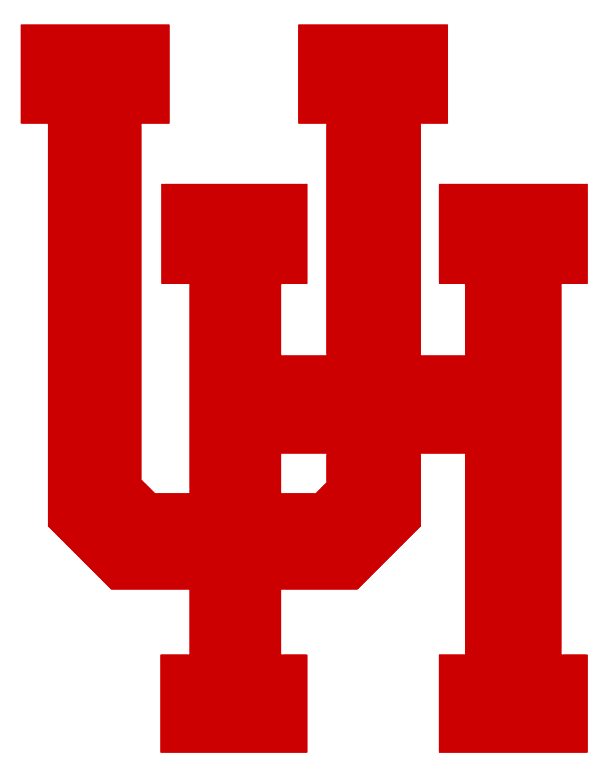
- Conference: Independent
- Record: 2–8
- Head coach: Bill Yeoman (14th season)
- Offensive scheme: Houston Veer
- Defensive coordinator: Don Todd (4th season)
- Captains: Paul Humphreys; Wilson Whitley
- Home stadium: Houston Astrodome

1975 NCAA Division I independents football records
	Conf.			Overall
Team	W	L	T	W		L		T
Rutgers		–		9	–	2	–	0
No. 10 Penn State		–		9	–	3	–	0
No. 20 West Virginia		–		9	–	3	–	0
Notre Dame		–		8	–	3	–	0
Virginia Tech		–		8	–	3	–	0
No. 15 Pittsburgh		–		8	–	4	–	0
Boston College		–		7	–	4	–	0
Georgia Tech		–		7	–	4	–	0
Memphis State		–		7	–	4	–	0
Navy		–		7	–	4	–	0
North Texas State		–		7	–	4	–	0
Southern Miss		–		7	–	4	–	0
South Carolina		–		7	–	5	–	0
Colgate		–		6	–	4	–	0
Cincinnati		–		6	–	5	–	0
Hawaii		–		6	–	5	–	0
Syracuse		–		6	–	5	–	0
Temple		–		6	–	5	–	0
Utah State		–		6	–	5	–	0
Dayton		–		5	–	6	–	0
Northeast Louisiana		–		4	–	6	–	1
Tulane		–		4	–	7	–	0
Villanova		–		4	–	7	–	0
Florida State		–		3	–	8	–	0
Air Force		–		2	–	8	–	1
Houston		–		2	–	8	–	0
Miami (FL)		–		2	–	8	–	0
Army		–		2	–	9	–	0
Marshall		–		2	–	9	–	0
Southern Illinois		–		1	–	9	–	1
Holy Cross		–		1	–	10	–	0
Louisville		–		1	–	10	–	0
Rankings from AP Poll

The 1975 Houston Cougars football team represented the University of Houston as an independent during the 1975 NCAA Division I football season. Led by 14th-year head coach Bill Yeoman the Cougars compiled a record of 2–8. The team played home games at the Houston Astrodome, a 50,000-person capacity stadium off-campus in Houston.

Houston had been admitted to the Southwest Conference in 1971, but the Cougars were ineligible for conference play until the 1976 season.

== Schedule ==
Date	Opponent	Site	Result	Attendance	Source
September 6	Lamar	Houston Astrodome; Houston, TX	W 20–3	24,075	
September 13	Rice	Houston Astrodome; Houston, TX (rivalry)	L 7–24	35,585	
September 27	SMU^{†}	Houston Astrodome; Houston, TX (rivalry)	L 16–27	28,713	
October 11	at North Texas State	Texas Stadium; Irving, TX	L 0–28	12,698	
October 17	at Miami (FL)	Miami Orange Bowl; Miami, FL	L 20–24	15,362	
November 1	at Cincinnati	Nippert Stadium; Cincinnati, OH	L 23–28	16,246	
November 8	Virginia Tech	Houston Astrodome; Houston, TX	L 28–34	17,350	
November 15	at Memphis State	Memphis Memorial Stadium; Memphis, TN	L 7–14	22,630	
November 22	Florida State	Houston Astrodome; Houston, TX	L 22–23	13,244	
November 29	Tulsa	Houston Astrodome; Houston, TX	W 42–30	12,127	
^{†}Homecoming

== Coaching staff ==
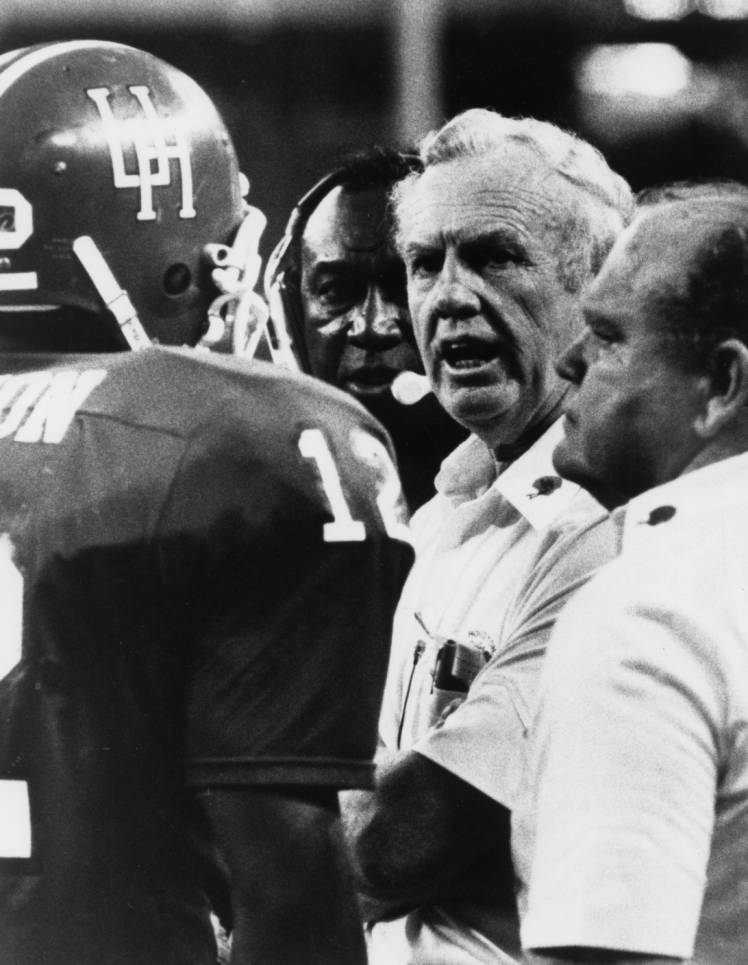
Head coach Bill Yeoman coaches Houston

Name	Position	Alma mater (year)	Year at Houston
Bill Yeoman	Head coach, offensive coordinator	Army (1948)	14th
