= 1975 North Texas State Mean Green football team =

American college football season

1975 North Texas State Mean Green football
- Conference: Independent
- Record: 7–4
- Head coach: Hayden Fry (3rd season)
- Home stadium: Fouts Field; Texas Stadium

1975 NCAA Division I independents football records
	Conf.			Overall
Team	W	L	T	W		L		T
Rutgers		–		9	–	2	–	0
No. 10 Penn State		–		9	–	3	–	0
No. 20 West Virginia		–		9	–	3	–	0
Notre Dame		–		8	–	3	–	0
Virginia Tech		–		8	–	3	–	0
No. 15 Pittsburgh		–		8	–	4	–	0
Boston College		–		7	–	4	–	0
Georgia Tech		–		7	–	4	–	0
Memphis State		–		7	–	4	–	0
Navy		–		7	–	4	–	0
North Texas State		–		7	–	4	–	0
Southern Miss		–		7	–	4	–	0
South Carolina		–		7	–	5	–	0
Colgate		–		6	–	4	–	0
Cincinnati		–		6	–	5	–	0
Hawaii		–		6	–	5	–	0
Syracuse		–		6	–	5	–	0
Temple		–		6	–	5	–	0
Utah State		–		6	–	5	–	0
Dayton		–		5	–	6	–	0
Northeast Louisiana		–		4	–	6	–	1
Tulane		–		4	–	7	–	0
Villanova		–		4	–	7	–	0
Florida State		–		3	–	8	–	0
Air Force		–		2	–	8	–	1
Houston		–		2	–	8	–	0
Miami (FL)		–		2	–	8	–	0
Army		–		2	–	9	–	0
Marshall		–		2	–	9	–	0
Southern Illinois		–		1	–	9	–	1
Holy Cross		–		1	–	10	–	0
Louisville		–		1	–	10	–	0
Rankings from AP Poll

The 1975 North Texas State Mean Green football team was an American football team that represented North Texas State University (now known as the University of North Texas) during the 1975 NCAA Division I football season as an independent. In their third year under head coach Hayden Fry, the team compiled a 7–4 record.

== Schedule ==
Date	Opponent	Site	Result	Attendance	Source
September 6	vs. UT Arlington	Texas Stadium; Irving, TX	W 27–14	5,000	
September 13	at Drake	Drake Stadium; Des Moines, IA	W 7–3	13,249	
September 20	at No. 20 San Diego State	San Diego Stadium; San Diego, CA	L 12–30	35,829	
September 27	at No. 17 Oklahoma State	Lewis Field; Stillwater, OK	L 7–61	30,000	
October 4	at Memphis State	Memphis Memorial Stadium; Memphis, TN	L 19–21	15,418	
October 11	Houston	Texas Stadium; Irving, TX	W 28–0	12,698	
October 18	at Mississippi State	Scott Field; Starkville, MS	L 12–15	32,000	
October 25	at Tennessee	Neyland Stadium; Knoxville, TN	W 21–14	72,670	
November 8	Cal Poly Pomona^{†}	Fouts Field; Denton, TX	W 27–17	18,472	
November 15	at New Mexico State	Memorial Stadium; Las Cruces, NM	W 24–20	5,833	
November 29	West Texas State	Fouts Field; Denton, TX	W 16–15	4,360	
^{†}Homecoming; Rankings from AP Poll released prior to the game
