= 1975 Penn State Nittany Lions football team =

American college football season

1975 Penn State Nittany Lions football

Eastern champion

Sugar Bowl, L 6–13 vs. Alabama
- Conference: Independent

Ranking
- Coaches: No. 10
- AP: No. 10
- Record: 9–3
- Head coach: Joe Paterno (10th season)
- Offensive scheme: I formation
- Defensive coordinator: Jim O'Hora (10th season)
- Base defense: 4–3
- Captains: Greg Buttle; John Quinn; Tom Rafferty
- Home stadium: Beaver Stadium

1975 NCAA Division I independents football records
	Conf.			Overall
Team	W	L	T	W		L		T
Rutgers		–		9	–	2	–	0
No. 10 Penn State		–		9	–	3	–	0
No. 20 West Virginia		–		9	–	3	–	0
Notre Dame		–		8	–	3	–	0
Virginia Tech		–		8	–	3	–	0
No. 15 Pittsburgh		–		8	–	4	–	0
Boston College		–		7	–	4	–	0
Georgia Tech		–		7	–	4	–	0
Memphis State		–		7	–	4	–	0
Navy		–		7	–	4	–	0
North Texas State		–		7	–	4	–	0
Southern Miss		–		7	–	4	–	0
South Carolina		–		7	–	5	–	0
Colgate		–		6	–	4	–	0
Cincinnati		–		6	–	5	–	0
Hawaii		–		6	–	5	–	0
Syracuse		–		6	–	5	–	0
Temple		–		6	–	5	–	0
Utah State		–		6	–	5	–	0
Dayton		–		5	–	6	–	0
Northeast Louisiana		–		4	–	6	–	1
Tulane		–		4	–	7	–	0
Villanova		–		4	–	7	–	0
Florida State		–		3	–	8	–	0
Air Force		–		2	–	8	–	1
Houston		–		2	–	8	–	0
Miami (FL)		–		2	–	8	–	0
Army		–		2	–	9	–	0
Marshall		–		2	–	9	–	0
Southern Illinois		–		1	–	9	–	1
Holy Cross		–		1	–	10	–	0
Louisville		–		1	–	10	–	0
Rankings from AP Poll

The 1975 Penn State Nittany Lions football team represented Pennsylvania State University as an independent during the 1975 NCAA Division I football season. Led by tenth-year head coach Joe Paterno, the Nittany Lions compiled a record of 9–3 with a loss to Alabama in the Sugar Bowl. Penn State played home games at Beaver Stadium in University Park, Pennsylvania.

== Schedule ==
Date	Opponent	Rank	Site	TV	Result	Attendance	Source
September 6	at Temple	No. 6	Franklin Field; Philadelphia, PA		W 26–25	57,112	
September 13	Stanford	No. 10	Beaver Stadium; University Park, PA		W 34–14	61,325	
September 20	at No. 3 Ohio State	No. 7	Ohio Stadium; Columbus, OH (rivalry)		L 9–17	88,093	
September 27	at Iowa	No. 12	Kinnick Stadium; Iowa City, IA		W 30–10	52,780	
October 4	Kentucky^{†}	No. 10	Beaver Stadium; University Park, PA		W 10–3	60,225	
October 11	No. 10 West Virginia	No. 9	Beaver Stadium; University Park, PA (rivalry)		W 39–0	59,658	
October 18	at Syracuse	No. 9	Archbold Stadium; Syracuse, NY (rivalry)		W 19–7	28,153	
October 25	Army	No. 9	Beaver Stadium; University Park, PA		W 31–0	59,381	
November 1	at No. 14 Maryland	No. 9	Byrd Stadium; College Park, MD (rivalry)		W 15–13	59,973	
November 8	NC State	No. 8	Beaver Stadium; University Park, PA		L 14–15	59,536	
November 22	at No. 17 Pittsburgh	No. 10	Three Rivers Stadium; Pittsburgh, PA (rivalry)	ABC	W 7–6	46,846	
December 31	vs. No. 4 Alabama	No. 8	Louisiana Superdome; New Orleans, LA (Sugar Bowl, rivalry)	ABC	L 6–13	75,212	
^{†}Homecoming; Rankings from AP Poll released prior to the game

== Roster ==
1975 Penn State Nittany Lions football team roster
Players
Coaches
Offense

Pos.	#	Name	Class
QB	18	John Andress	Jr
WR	16	Dick Barvinchak	Sr
OT	71	Brad Benson	Jr
WR	44	Jimmy Cefalo	So
OT	71	Keith Dorney	Fr
WR	46	Scott Fitzkee	Fr
QB	14	Chuck Fusina	Fr
G	72	Tom Rafferty	Sr
OT	68	George Reihner	Jr
TE	82	Mickey Shuler	So

Defense

Pos.	#	Name	Class
LB	53	Kurt Allerman	Jr
DE	51	Dave Brockway	Jr
DB	25	Tom Bradley	Fr
LB	67	Greg Buttle	Sr
DT	65	Ron Coder	Sr
DE	64	Ron Crosby	Jr
DT	93	Eric Cummingham	So
LB	95	Tom DePaso	So
LB	38	Ron Hostetler	So
LB	33	Jim Rosecrans	Sr

Special teams

Pos.	#	Name	Class
K	99	Chris Bahr	Sr

Head coach

- Joe Paterno

Coordinators/assistant coaches

- Dick Anderson
- Booker Brooks
- John Chuckran
- Gregg Ducatte
- Fran Ganter
- Jim O'Hora
- Bob Phillips
- John Rosenberg
- Jerry Sandusky
- J. T. White

Legend

- (C) Team captain
- (S) Suspended
- (I) Ineligible
- Injured
- Redshirt

Roster

== NFL draft ==
Four Nittany Lions were drafted in the 1976 NFL draft.

Round	Pick	Overall	Name	Position	Team
2nd	23	51	Chris Bahr	Kicker	Cincinnati Bengals
3rd	7	67	Greg Buttle	Linebacker	New York Jets
3rd	10	70	Ron Coder	Defensive tackle	Pittsburgh Steelers
4th	27	119	Tom Rafferty	Center	Dallas Cowboys
