= 1975 UMass Minutemen football team =

American college football season

1975 UMass Minutemen football
- Conference: Yankee Conference
- Record: 8–2 (4–1 Yankee)
- Head coach: Dick MacPherson (5th season)
- Home stadium: Alumni Stadium

1975 Yankee Conference football standings
	Conf.					Overall
Team	W		L		T	W		L		T
No. 9 New Hampshire $^	5	–	0	–	0	9	–	3	–	0
UMass	4	–	1	–	0	8	–	2	–	0
Connecticut	3	–	2	–	0	4	–	7	–	0
Boston University	1	–	4	–	0	5	–	6	–	0
Maine	1	–	4	–	0	4	–	6	–	0
Rhode Island	1	–	4	–	0	2	–	8	–	0
$ – Conference champion; ^ – NCAA Division II playoff participant; Rankings from Associated Press poll

The 1975 UMass Minutemen football team represented the University of Massachusetts Amherst in the 1975 NCAA Division II football season as a member of the Yankee Conference in NCAA Division II. The team was coached by Dick MacPherson and played its home games at Alumni Stadium in Hadley, Massachusetts. UMass finished the season with a record of 8–2 overall and 4–1 in conference play.

== Schedule ==
Date	Opponent	Rank	Site	Result	Attendance	Source
September 20	Maine		Alumni Stadium; Hadley, MA	W 10–0	10,500	
September 27	Dartmouth*		Alumni Stadium; Hadley, MA	W 7–3	12,400	
October 4	Northeastern*		Alumni Stadium; Hadley, MA	W 34–14	10,200	
October 11	Boston University		Alumni Stadium; Hadley, MA	W 21–0	2,000	
October 18	Rhode Island		Alumni Stadium; Hadley, MA	W 23–7	5,500–6,500	
October 25	at Connecticut		Memorial Stadium; Storrs, CT (rivalry)	W 29–14	7,019–7,091	
November 1	at Western Illinois*		Hanson Field; Macomb, IL	W 16–13	9,849	
November 8	Holy Cross*		Alumni Stadium; Hadley, MA	W 45–13	10,400–13,400	
November 15	at New Hampshire	No. 11	Cowell Stadium; Durham, NH (rivalry)	L 11–14	13,400–14,500	
November 22	at Boston College*		Alumni Stadium; Chestnut Hill, MA (rivalry)	L 14–24	23,609	
*Non-conference game; Rankings from AP Poll released prior to the game
