= 1975 Cincinnati Bearcats football team =

American college football season

1975 Cincinnati Bearcats football
- Conference: Independent
- Record: 6–5
- Head coach: Tony Mason (3rd season)
- Captains: Jay Bonds; Paul Hunter
- Home stadium: Nippert Stadium

1975 NCAA Division I independents football records
	Conf.			Overall
Team	W	L	T	W		L		T
Rutgers		–		9	–	2	–	0
No. 10 Penn State		–		9	–	3	–	0
No. 20 West Virginia		–		9	–	3	–	0
Notre Dame		–		8	–	3	–	0
Virginia Tech		–		8	–	3	–	0
No. 15 Pittsburgh		–		8	–	4	–	0
Boston College		–		7	–	4	–	0
Georgia Tech		–		7	–	4	–	0
Memphis State		–		7	–	4	–	0
Navy		–		7	–	4	–	0
North Texas State		–		7	–	4	–	0
Southern Miss		–		7	–	4	–	0
South Carolina		–		7	–	5	–	0
Colgate		–		6	–	4	–	0
Cincinnati		–		6	–	5	–	0
Hawaii		–		6	–	5	–	0
Syracuse		–		6	–	5	–	0
Temple		–		6	–	5	–	0
Utah State		–		6	–	5	–	0
Dayton		–		5	–	6	–	0
Northeast Louisiana		–		4	–	6	–	1
Tulane		–		4	–	7	–	0
Villanova		–		4	–	7	–	0
Florida State		–		3	–	8	–	0
Air Force		–		2	–	8	–	1
Houston		–		2	–	8	–	0
Miami (FL)		–		2	–	8	–	0
Army		–		2	–	9	–	0
Marshall		–		2	–	9	–	0
Southern Illinois		–		1	–	9	–	1
Holy Cross		–		1	–	10	–	0
Louisville		–		1	–	10	–	0
Rankings from AP Poll

The 1975 Cincinnati Bearcats football team represented University of Cincinnati as an independent during 1975 NCAA Division I football season. Led by third-year head coach Tony Mason, the Bearcats compiled a record of 6–5. The team played home games at Nippert Stadium in Cincinnati.

== Schedule ==
Date	Opponent	Site	Result	Attendance	Source
September 13	Richmond	Nippert Stadium; Cincinnati, OH	W 19–6	10,751	
September 20	Memphis State	Nippert Stadium; Cincinnati, OH (rivalry)	W 13–3		
September 27	at Louisville	Fairgrounds Stadium; Louisville, KY (The Keg of Nails)	W 45–27	13,867	
October 4	at Temple	Veterans Stadium; Philadelphia, PA	L 17–21	10,164	
October 11	at Tulsa	Skelly Stadium; Tulsa, OK	L 16–24	27,000	
October 18	Arkansas State	Nippert Stadium; Cincinnati, OH	L 9–14	6,556	
October 25	Southwestern Louisiana	Nippert Stadium; Cincinnati, OH	W 23–17		
November 1	Houston	Nippert Stadium; Cincinnati, OH	W 28–23	16,246	
November 8	No. 16 Maryland	Riverfront Stadium; Cincinnati, OH	L 19–21	16,478	
November 15	at Ohio	Peden Stadium; Athens, OH	W 6–5	13,850	
November 22	at No. 16 Miami (OH)	Miami Field; Oxford, OH (Victory Bell)	L 13–21		
Rankings from AP Poll released prior to the game

== Game Films ==
- 1975 Cincinnati - Maryland Football Game Film
- 1975 Cincinnati - Ohio U Football Game Film

== Roster ==
1975 Cincinnati Bearcats football team roster
Players
Coaches
Offense

Pos.	#	Name	Class
TE	89	Steve Ball	Jr
QB	15	Dan Hauser	Sr
RB	2	Ron Hayes	Jr
QB	16	Jack Hess	Sr
WR	7	Jimmy Kelly	Sr
FB	39	Dan Rains	Jr

Defense

Pos.	#	Name	Class
DB	22	Wentford Gaines	Sr
DB	33	Mike Ivanovich	So
DB	5	Tom Marvaso	Sr
LB	90	Clarence Sanders	Sr
LB	30	Mike Woods	So

Special teams

Pos.	#	Name	Class
K	4	Mike Connell	So

Head coach

- Tony Mason

Coordinators/assistant coaches

Legend

- (C) Team captain
- (S) Suspended
- (I) Ineligible
- Injured
- Redshirt
