= 1975 Temple Owls football team =

American college football season

1975 Temple Owls football
- Conference: Independent
- Record: 6–5
- Head coach: Wayne Hardin (5th season)
- Home stadium: Veterans Stadium, Franklin Field

1975 NCAA Division I independents football records
	Conf.			Overall
Team	W	L	T	W		L		T
Rutgers		–		9	–	2	–	0
No. 10 Penn State		–		9	–	3	–	0
No. 20 West Virginia		–		9	–	3	–	0
Notre Dame		–		8	–	3	–	0
Virginia Tech		–		8	–	3	–	0
No. 15 Pittsburgh		–		8	–	4	–	0
Boston College		–		7	–	4	–	0
Georgia Tech		–		7	–	4	–	0
Memphis State		–		7	–	4	–	0
Navy		–		7	–	4	–	0
North Texas State		–		7	–	4	–	0
Southern Miss		–		7	–	4	–	0
South Carolina		–		7	–	5	–	0
Colgate		–		6	–	4	–	0
Cincinnati		–		6	–	5	–	0
Hawaii		–		6	–	5	–	0
Syracuse		–		6	–	5	–	0
Temple		–		6	–	5	–	0
Utah State		–		6	–	5	–	0
Dayton		–		5	–	6	–	0
Northeast Louisiana		–		4	–	6	–	1
Tulane		–		4	–	7	–	0
Villanova		–		4	–	7	–	0
Florida State		–		3	–	8	–	0
Air Force		–		2	–	8	–	1
Houston		–		2	–	8	–	0
Miami (FL)		–		2	–	8	–	0
Army		–		2	–	9	–	0
Marshall		–		2	–	9	–	0
Southern Illinois		–		1	–	9	–	1
Holy Cross		–		1	–	10	–	0
Louisville		–		1	–	10	–	0
Rankings from AP Poll

The 1975 Temple Owls football team represented Temple University in the 1975 NCAA Division I-A football season. In the first game of the season, Temple nearly upset sixth-ranked Penn State, but lost 25-26.

== Schedule ==
Date	Opponent	Site	Result	Attendance	Source
September 6	No. 6 Penn State	Franklin Field; Philadelphia, PA	L 25–26	57,112	
September 13	at West Virginia	Mountaineer Field; Morgantown, WV	L 7–50	32,271	
September 20	Boston College	Veterans Stadium; Philadelphia, PA	L 9–27	10,986	
October 4	Cincinnati	Veterans Stadium; Philadelphia, PA	W 21–17	10,164	
October 11	Pittsburgh	Veterans Stadium; Philadelphia, PA	L 6–55	10,791	
October 18	at Akron	Rubber Bowl; Akron, OH	L 23–24	8,236	
October 25	at No. 14 (D-II) Delaware	Delaware Stadium; Newark, DE	W 45–0	22,062	
November 1	at Dayton	Welcome Stadium; Dayton, OH	W 23–10	8,700	
November 8	Rhode Island	Veterans Stadium; Philadelphia, PA	W 45–6	11,491	
November 22	Drake	Veterans Stadium; Philadelphia, PA	W 44–7	5,837	
November 27	Villanova	Veterans Stadium; Philadelphia, PA (Mayor's Cup)	W 41–3	6,294	
Rankings from AP Poll released prior to the game

== Roster ==
1975 Temple Owls football team roster
Players			Coaches
Offense: Pos. / # / Name / Class	Defense: Pos. / # / Name / Class; DT / 72 / Joe Klecko / Jr	Special teams: Pos. / # / Name / Class	Head coach: Wayne Hardin; Coordinators/assistant coaches Legend: (C) Team captain; (S) Suspended; (I) Ineligible; Injured; Redshirt
