= 1975 West Virginia Mountaineers football team =

American college football season

1975 West Virginia Mountaineers football

Peach Bowl champion

Peach Bowl, W 13–10 vs. NC State
- Conference: Independent

Ranking
- Coaches: No. 17
- AP: No. 20
- Record: 9–3
- Head coach: Bobby Bowden (6th season)
- Offensive coordinator: Frank Cignetti Sr.
- Defensive coordinator: Chuck Klausing
- Home stadium: Mountaineer Field

1975 NCAA Division I independents football records
	Conf.			Overall
Team	W	L	T	W		L		T
Rutgers		–		9	–	2	–	0
No. 10 Penn State		–		9	–	3	–	0
No. 20 West Virginia		–		9	–	3	–	0
Notre Dame		–		8	–	3	–	0
Virginia Tech		–		8	–	3	–	0
No. 15 Pittsburgh		–		8	–	4	–	0
Boston College		–		7	–	4	–	0
Georgia Tech		–		7	–	4	–	0
Memphis State		–		7	–	4	–	0
Navy		–		7	–	4	–	0
North Texas State		–		7	–	4	–	0
Southern Miss		–		7	–	4	–	0
South Carolina		–		7	–	5	–	0
Colgate		–		6	–	4	–	0
Cincinnati		–		6	–	5	–	0
Hawaii		–		6	–	5	–	0
Syracuse		–		6	–	5	–	0
Temple		–		6	–	5	–	0
Utah State		–		6	–	5	–	0
Dayton		–		5	–	6	–	0
Northeast Louisiana		–		4	–	6	–	1
Tulane		–		4	–	7	–	0
Villanova		–		4	–	7	–	0
Florida State		–		3	–	8	–	0
Air Force		–		2	–	8	–	1
Houston		–		2	–	8	–	0
Miami (FL)		–		2	–	8	–	0
Army		–		2	–	9	–	0
Marshall		–		2	–	9	–	0
Southern Illinois		–		1	–	9	–	1
Holy Cross		–		1	–	10	–	0
Louisville		–		1	–	10	–	0
Rankings from AP Poll

The 1975 West Virginia Mountaineers football team represented West Virginia University in the 1975 NCAA Division I football season. This was Bobby Bowden's final season as head coach of West Virginia, before moving to Florida State the next season. West Virginia won the Peach Bowl game against NC State, to finish the season with a record of 9–3. They were ranked 17 in the final Coaches Poll and 20 in the final AP Poll.

== Schedule ==
Date	Opponent	Rank	Site	TV	Result	Attendance	Source
September 13	Temple		Mountaineer Field; Morgantown, WV		W 50–7	32,271	
September 20	at California	No. 20	California Memorial Stadium; Berkeley, CA		W 28–10	23,375	
September 27	Boston College	No. 14	Mountaineer Field; Morgantown, WV		W 35–18	34,023	
October 4	at SMU	No. 11	Cotton Bowl; Dallas, TX		W 28–22	27,665	
October 11	at No. 9 Penn State	No. 10	Beaver Stadium; University Park, PA (rivalry)		L 0–39	59,658	
October 18	Tulane^{†}		Mountaineer Field; Morgantown, WV		L 14–16	33,842	
October 25	Virginia Tech		Mountaineer Field; Morgantown, WV (rivalry)		W 10–7	29,670	
November 1	Kent State		Mountaineer Field; Morgantown, WV		W 38–13	30,160	
November 8	No. 20 Pittsburgh		Mountaineer Field; Morgantown, WV (rivalry)	ABC	W 17–14	35,298	
November 15	at Richmond		City Stadium; Richmond, VA		W 31–13	16,500	
November 22	at Syracuse		Archbold Stadium; Syracuse, NY (rivalry)		L 19–20	15,336	
December 31	vs. NC State		Atlanta–Fulton County Stadium; Atlanta, GA (Peach Bowl)	Mizlou	W 13–10	45,134	
^{†}Homecoming; Rankings from AP Poll released prior to the game

== Roster ==
1975 West Virginia Mountaineers football team roster
Players
Coaches
Offense

Pos.	#	Name	Class
QB	2	Dan Kendra	So
WR	8	Vance Pettigrew	Jr
QB	9	Tom Loadman	So
WR	12	Tommy Bowden	Jr
RB	24	Artie Owens	Sr
RB	40	Ron Lee	Sr
OL	75	Steve Earley	Jr
OT	79	David Van Halanger	Sr
TE	80	Ben McDay	So
TE	82	Robin Meeley	Fr

Defense

Pos.	#	Name	Class
DB	18	Tom Florence	Sr
DB	20	Leon Carter	Jr
DB	22	Tom Pridemore	So
DB	47	Paul Jordan	Jr
LB	50	Ken Culbertson	Jr
DE	51	Fran Gleason	So
LB	63	Ray Marshall	Sr
DL	71	Rich Lukowski	Sr

Special teams

Pos.	#	Name	Class
P	10	Jeff Fette	So

Head coach

- Bobby Bowden

Coordinators/assistant coaches

- Frank Cignetti Sr.
- Chuck Klausing

Legend

- (C) Team captain
- (S) Suspended
- (I) Ineligible
- Injured
- Redshirt
