= 1975 Colgate Red Raiders football team =

American college football season

1975 Colgate Red Raiders football
- Conference: Independent
- Record: 6–4
- Head coach: Neil Wheelwright (8th season)
- Captains: Bruce Basile; James Gregory
- Home stadium: Andy Kerr Stadium

1975 NCAA Division I independents football records
	Conf.			Overall
Team	W	L	T	W		L		T
Rutgers		–		9	–	2	–	0
No. 10 Penn State		–		9	–	3	–	0
No. 20 West Virginia		–		9	–	3	–	0
Notre Dame		–		8	–	3	–	0
Virginia Tech		–		8	–	3	–	0
No. 15 Pittsburgh		–		8	–	4	–	0
Boston College		–		7	–	4	–	0
Georgia Tech		–		7	–	4	–	0
Memphis State		–		7	–	4	–	0
Navy		–		7	–	4	–	0
North Texas State		–		7	–	4	–	0
Southern Miss		–		7	–	4	–	0
South Carolina		–		7	–	5	–	0
Colgate		–		6	–	4	–	0
Cincinnati		–		6	–	5	–	0
Hawaii		–		6	–	5	–	0
Syracuse		–		6	–	5	–	0
Temple		–		6	–	5	–	0
Utah State		–		6	–	5	–	0
Dayton		–		5	–	6	–	0
Northeast Louisiana		–		4	–	6	–	1
Tulane		–		4	–	7	–	0
Villanova		–		4	–	7	–	0
Florida State		–		3	–	8	–	0
Air Force		–		2	–	8	–	1
Houston		–		2	–	8	–	0
Miami (FL)		–		2	–	8	–	0
Army		–		2	–	9	–	0
Marshall		–		2	–	9	–	0
Southern Illinois		–		1	–	9	–	1
Holy Cross		–		1	–	10	–	0
Louisville		–		1	–	10	–	0
Rankings from AP Poll

The 1975 Colgate Red Raiders football team was an American football team that represented Colgate University as an independent during the 1975 NCAA Division I football season. In its eighth and final season under head coach Neil Wheelwright, the team compiled a 6–4 record. Bruce Basile and James Gregory were the team captains.

The team played its home games at Andy Kerr Stadium in Hamilton, New York.

== Schedule ==
Date	Opponent	Site	Result	Attendance	Source
September 20	The Citadel	Andy Kerr Stadium; Hamilton, NY	W 16–0	7,500	
September 27	at Cornell	Schoellkopf Field; Ithaca, NY (rivalry)	W 24–22	14,000	
October 4	at Yale	Yale Bowl; New Haven, CT	L 10–24	13,758	
October 11	at Holy Cross	Fitton Field; Worcester, MA	W 20–14	6,500	
October 18	at Princeton	Palmer Stadium; Princeton, NJ	W 22–21	12,500	
October 25	Lafayette	Andy Kerr Stadium; Hamilton, NY	W 56–2		
November 1	at Lehigh	Taylor Stadium; Bethlehem, PA	L 6–38	15,000	
November 8	Bucknell	Andy Kerr Stadium; Hamilton, NY	L 16–24	6,000	
November 15	at William & Mary	Cary Field; Williamsburg, VA	W 21–17	8,000	
November 22	at Rutgers	Rutgers Stadium; Piscataway, NJ	L 14–56	14,000	

== Leading players ==
Two trophies were awarded to the Red Raiders' most valuable players in 1975:

- Bruce Basile, quarterback, received the Andy Kerr Trophy, awarded to the most valuable offensive player.
- Mark Murphy, defensive back, received the Hal W. Lahar Trophy, awarded to the most valuable defensive player.

Statistical leaders for the 1975 Red Raiders included:

- Rushing: Pat Healy, 732 yards and 5 touchdowns on 143 attempts
- Passing: Bruce Basile, 828 yards, 49 completions and 5 touchdowns on 101 attempts
- Receiving: Brion Applegate, 510 yards and 2 touchdowns on 25 receptions
- Total offense: Bruce Basile, 1,249 yards (828 passing, 421 rushing)
- Scoring: Jerry Andrewlavage, 47 points from 23 PATs and 8 field goals
- All-purpose yards: Henry White, 982 yards (619 rushing, 335 kickoff returning, 28 receiving)
