= 1975 Holy Cross Crusaders football team =

American college football season

1975 Holy Cross Crusaders football
- Conference: Independent
- Record: 1–10
- Head coach: Ed Doherty (5th season)
- Captains: Lou Kobza; Dave Quehl
- Home stadium: Fitton Field

1975 NCAA Division I independents football records
	Conf.			Overall
Team	W	L	T	W		L		T
Rutgers		–		9	–	2	–	0
No. 10 Penn State		–		9	–	3	–	0
No. 20 West Virginia		–		9	–	3	–	0
Notre Dame		–		8	–	3	–	0
Virginia Tech		–		8	–	3	–	0
No. 15 Pittsburgh		–		8	–	4	–	0
Boston College		–		7	–	4	–	0
Georgia Tech		–		7	–	4	–	0
Memphis State		–		7	–	4	–	0
Navy		–		7	–	4	–	0
North Texas State		–		7	–	4	–	0
Southern Miss		–		7	–	4	–	0
South Carolina		–		7	–	5	–	0
Colgate		–		6	–	4	–	0
Cincinnati		–		6	–	5	–	0
Hawaii		–		6	–	5	–	0
Syracuse		–		6	–	5	–	0
Temple		–		6	–	5	–	0
Utah State		–		6	–	5	–	0
Dayton		–		5	–	6	–	0
Northeast Louisiana		–		4	–	6	–	1
Tulane		–		4	–	7	–	0
Villanova		–		4	–	7	–	0
Florida State		–		3	–	8	–	0
Air Force		–		2	–	8	–	1
Houston		–		2	–	8	–	0
Miami (FL)		–		2	–	8	–	0
Army		–		2	–	9	–	0
Marshall		–		2	–	9	–	0
Southern Illinois		–		1	–	9	–	1
Holy Cross		–		1	–	10	–	0
Louisville		–		1	–	10	–	0
Rankings from AP Poll

The 1975 Holy Cross Crusaders football team was an American football team that represented the College of the Holy Cross as an independent during the 1975 NCAA Division I football season. Ed Doherty returned for his fifth year as head coach. The team compiled a record of 1–10.

All home games were played at Fitton Field on the Holy Cross campus in Worcester, Massachusetts.

== Schedule ==
Date	Opponent	Site	Result	Attendance	Source
September 13	at Army	Michie Stadium; West Point, NY	L 7–44	28,219	
September 27	at Harvard	Harvard Stadium; Boston, MA	L 7–18	11,000	
October 4	at Dartmouth	Memorial Field; Hanover, NH	L 7–28	13,400	
October 11	Colgate^{†}	Fitton Field; Worcester, MA	L 14–20	6,500	
October 18	at Furman	Sirrine Stadium; Greenville, SC	L 14–21	10,000	
October 25	Brown	Fitton Field; Worcester, MA	W 21–20	11,000	
November 1	Boston University^	Fitton Field; Worcester, MA	L 0–6	12,500	
November 8	at UMass	Alumni Stadium; Hadley, MA	L 13–45	10,400–13,400	
November 15	Villanova	Fitton Field; Worcester, MA	L 12–13	7,500	
November 22	at Connecticut	Memorial Stadium; Storrs, CT	L 14–35	6,813	
November 29	Boston College	Fitton Field; Worcester, MA (rivalry)	L 10–24	14,731	
^{†}Homecoming; ^ Family Weekend

== Statistical leaders ==
Statistical leaders for the 1975 Crusaders included:

- Rushing: Steve Hunt, 688 yards and 2 touchdowns on 173 attempts
- Passing: Bob Martin, 1,486 yards, 110 completions and 7 touchdowns on 234 attempts
- Receiving: Dave Quehl, 959 yards and 5 touchdowns on 63 receptions
- Scoring: Dave Quehl, 30 points from 5 touchdowns
- Total offense: Bob Martin, 1,398 yards (1,486 passing, minus-88 rushing)
- All-purpose yards: Dave Quehl, 966 yards (959 receiving, 8 returning, minus-1 rushing)
- Interceptions: Jim Coughlin, 3 interceptions for 14 yards
