= 1975 New Hampshire Wildcats football team =

American college football season

1975 New Hampshire Wildcats football

Yankee Conference champion

NCAA Semifinal–Grantland Rice Bowl, L 16–17 at Montana State
- Conference: Yankee Conference

Ranking
- Coaches: No. 8
- AP: No. 9
- Record: 9–3 (5–0 Yankee)
- Head coach: Bill Bowes (4th season)
- Home stadium: Cowell Stadium

1975 Yankee Conference football standings
	Conf.					Overall
Team	W		L		T	W		L		T
No. 9 New Hampshire $^	5	–	0	–	0	9	–	3	–	0
UMass	4	–	1	–	0	8	–	2	–	0
Connecticut	3	–	2	–	0	4	–	7	–	0
Boston University	1	–	4	–	0	5	–	6	–	0
Maine	1	–	4	–	0	4	–	6	–	0
Rhode Island	1	–	4	–	0	2	–	8	–	0
$ – Conference champion; ^ – NCAA Division II playoff participant; Rankings from Associated Press poll

The 1975 New Hampshire Wildcats football team was an American football team that represented the University of New Hampshire as a member of the Yankee Conference during the 1975 NCAA Division II football season. In its fourth year under head coach Bill Bowes, the team compiled a 9–3 record (5–0 against conference opponents) and won the Yankee Conference championship.

== Schedule ==
Date	Opponent	Site	Result	Attendance	Source
September 13	West Chester*	Cowell Stadium; Durham, NH	W 24–0	9,656	
September 19	at Boston University	Nickerson Field; Boston, MA	W 21–20	4,820	
September 27	No. 9 Delaware*	Cowell Stadium; Durham, NH	L 7–16	10,212	
October 4	at Connecticut	Memorial Stadium; Storrs, CT	W 14–10	11,710	
October 11	at Maine	Alumni Field; Orono, ME (Battle for the Brice–Cowell Musket)	W 24–15	7,800	
October 18	Central Connecticut*	Cowell Stadium; Durham, NH	W 28–0	2,833	
October 25	Northeastern	Cowell Stadium; Durham, NH	W 56–7	12,191	
November 1	at Rhode Island	Meade Stadium; Kingston, RI	W 23–6	6,123–6,132	
November 8	at Springfield*	Springfield, MA	L 12–17	3,280	
November 15	No. 11 UMass	Cowell Stadium; Durham, NH (rivalry)	W 14–11	13,400–14,500	
November 29	at No. 11 Lehigh*	Taylor Stadium; Bethlehem, PA (NCAA Division II Quarterfinal)	W 35–21	9,100	
December 6	vs. No. 4 Western Kentucky*	BREC Memorial Stadium; Baton Rouge, LA (NCAA Division II Semifinal—Grantland Rice Bowl)	L 3–14	6,000	
*Non-conference game; Rankings from AP Poll released prior to the game
