= 1975 Boston College Eagles football team =

American college football season

1975 Boston College Eagles football
- Conference: Independent
- Record: 7–4
- Head coach: Joe Yukica (8th season)
- Captain: Mike Kruczek
- Home stadium: Alumni Stadium

1975 NCAA Division I independents football records
	Conf.			Overall
Team	W	L	T	W		L		T
Rutgers		–		9	–	2	–	0
No. 10 Penn State		–		9	–	3	–	0
No. 20 West Virginia		–		9	–	3	–	0
Notre Dame		–		8	–	3	–	0
Virginia Tech		–		8	–	3	–	0
No. 15 Pittsburgh		–		8	–	4	–	0
Boston College		–		7	–	4	–	0
Georgia Tech		–		7	–	4	–	0
Memphis State		–		7	–	4	–	0
Navy		–		7	–	4	–	0
North Texas State		–		7	–	4	–	0
Southern Miss		–		7	–	4	–	0
South Carolina		–		7	–	5	–	0
Colgate		–		6	–	4	–	0
Cincinnati		–		6	–	5	–	0
Hawaii		–		6	–	5	–	0
Syracuse		–		6	–	5	–	0
Temple		–		6	–	5	–	0
Utah State		–		6	–	5	–	0
Dayton		–		5	–	6	–	0
Northeast Louisiana		–		4	–	6	–	1
Tulane		–		4	–	7	–	0
Villanova		–		4	–	7	–	0
Florida State		–		3	–	8	–	0
Air Force		–		2	–	8	–	1
Houston		–		2	–	8	–	0
Miami (FL)		–		2	–	8	–	0
Army		–		2	–	9	–	0
Marshall		–		2	–	9	–	0
Southern Illinois		–		1	–	9	–	1
Holy Cross		–		1	–	10	–	0
Louisville		–		1	–	10	–	0
Rankings from AP Poll

The 1975 Boston College Eagles football team represented Boston College as an independent during the 1975 NCAA Division I football season. In its eighth season under head coach Joe Yukica, the team compiled a 7–4 record and outscored opponents by a total of 227 to 146.

The team's statistical leaders included Mike Kruczek with 1,132 passing yards, Keith Barnette with 958 rushing yards, and Mike Godbolt with 354 receiving yards.

The team played its home games at Alumni Stadium in Chestnut Hill, Massachusetts.

== Schedule ==
Date	Opponent	Site	Result	Attendance	Source
September 15	vs. No. 9 Notre Dame	Schaefer Stadium; Foxboro, MA (Holy War)	L 3–17	61,501	
September 20	at Temple	Veterans Stadium; Philadelphia, PA	W 27–9	10,986	
September 27	at No. 14 West Virginia	Mountaineer Field; Morgantown, WV	L 18–35	34,023	
October 4	Villanova	Alumni Stadium; Chestnut Hill, MA	W 41–12	20,500	
October 11	Tulane	Alumni Stadium; Chestnut Hill, MA	L 7–17	11,775	
October 18	Navy	Alumni Stadium; Chestnut Hill, MA	W 17–3	16,227	
October 25	at Syracuse	Archbold Stadium; Syracuse, NY	L 14–22	24,105	
November 1	Miami (FL)	Alumni Stadium; Chestnut Hill, MA	W 21–7	25,331	
November 8	at Army	Michie Stadium; West Point, NY	W 31–0	38,863	
November 22	UMass	Alumni Stadium; Chestnut Hill, MA (rivalry)	W 24–14	23,609	
November 29	at Holy Cross	Fitton Field; Worcester, MA (rivalry)	W 24–10	14,731	
Rankings from AP Poll released prior to the game

== Roster ==
1975 Boston College Eagles football team roster
Players
Coaches
Offense

Pos.	#	Name	Class
RB	27	Keith Barnette
QB	8	Mike Kruczek	Sr
OT	75	Tom Lynch	Sr
G	62	Don Macek	Sr
G	66	Steve Schindler	Jr
RB	44	Earl Strong
TE	80	Bob Watts
WR	21	Dave Zumbach

Defense

Pos.	#	Name	Class
DT	57	Pete Cronan	Jr
LB	51	Kevin Cunniff
DE	85	Byron Hemingway

Special teams

Pos.	#	Name	Class
K	24	Fred Steinfort	Sr

Head coach

- Joe Yukica

Coordinators/assistant coaches

Legend

- (C) Team captain
- (S) Suspended
- (I) Ineligible
- Injured
- Redshirt
