= 1975 Rutgers Scarlet Knights football team =

American college football season

1975 Rutgers Scarlet Knights football
- Conference: Independent
- Record: 9–2
- Head coach: Frank R. Burns (3rd season)
- Home stadium: Rutgers Stadium

1975 NCAA Division I independents football records
	Conf.			Overall
Team	W	L	T	W		L		T
Rutgers		–		9	–	2	–	0
No. 10 Penn State		–		9	–	3	–	0
No. 20 West Virginia		–		9	–	3	–	0
Notre Dame		–		8	–	3	–	0
Virginia Tech		–		8	–	3	–	0
No. 15 Pittsburgh		–		8	–	4	–	0
Boston College		–		7	–	4	–	0
Georgia Tech		–		7	–	4	–	0
Memphis State		–		7	–	4	–	0
Navy		–		7	–	4	–	0
North Texas State		–		7	–	4	–	0
Southern Miss		–		7	–	4	–	0
South Carolina		–		7	–	5	–	0
Colgate		–		6	–	4	–	0
Cincinnati		–		6	–	5	–	0
Hawaii		–		6	–	5	–	0
Syracuse		–		6	–	5	–	0
Temple		–		6	–	5	–	0
Utah State		–		6	–	5	–	0
Dayton		–		5	–	6	–	0
Northeast Louisiana		–		4	–	6	–	1
Tulane		–		4	–	7	–	0
Villanova		–		4	–	7	–	0
Florida State		–		3	–	8	–	0
Air Force		–		2	–	8	–	1
Houston		–		2	–	8	–	0
Miami (FL)		–		2	–	8	–	0
Army		–		2	–	9	–	0
Marshall		–		2	–	9	–	0
Southern Illinois		–		1	–	9	–	1
Holy Cross		–		1	–	10	–	0
Louisville		–		1	–	10	–	0
Rankings from AP Poll

The 1975 Rutgers Scarlet Knights football team represented Rutgers University as an independent during the 1975 NCAA Division I football season. In their third season under head coach Frank R. Burns, the Scarlet Knights compiled a 9–2 record while competing as an independent and outscored their opponents 347 to 91. The team's statistical leaders included Jeff Rebholz with 715 passing yards, Curt Edwards with 1,157 rushing yards, and Mark Twitty with 544 receiving yards.

The Scarlet Knights played their home games at Rutgers Stadium in Piscataway, New Jersey, across the river from the university's main campus in New Brunswick, New Jersey.

== Schedule ==
Date	Opponent	Site	Result	Attendance	Source
September 20	Bucknell	Rutgers Stadium; Piscataway, NJ	W 47–3	12,500	
September 27	at Princeton	Palmer Stadium; Princeton, NJ (rivalry)	L 7–10	30,000	
October 4	Hawaii	Rutgers Stadium; Piscataway, NJ	W 7–3	17,000	
October 11	at Lehigh	Taylor Stadium; Bethlehem, PA	L 20–34	11,500	
October 18	William & Mary	Rutgers Stadium; Piscataway, NJ	W 24–0	10,000	
October 25	Columbia	Rutgers Stadium; Piscataway, NJ	W 41–0	7,000	
November 1	at Connecticut	Memorial Stadium; Storrs, CT	W 35–8	9,837	
November 8	Lafayette	Rutgers Stadium; Piscataway, NJ	W 48–6	12,000	
November 15	at Boston University	Nickerson Field; Boston, MA	W 41–3	2,013	
November 22	Colgate	Rutgers Stadium; Piscataway, NJ	W 56–14	14,000	
November 29	Syracuse	Rutgers Stadium; Piscataway, NJ	W 21–10	22,000	

== Roster ==
1975 Rutgers Scarlet Knights football team roster
Players
Coaches
Offense

Pos.	#	Name	Class
QB	11	Bert Kosup	Jr

Defense

Pos.	#	Name	Class
DT	70	John Alexander	Jr
DT	64	Dan Gray	So
DB	31	Don Harris	Jr

Special teams

Pos.	#	Name	Class

Head coach

- Frank R. Burns

Coordinators/assistant coaches

Legend

- (C) Team captain
- (S) Suspended
- (I) Ineligible
- Injured
- Redshirt
