= Jimmy Sharpe =

American football player and coach (born 1939)

Biographical details
- Born: October 31, 1939 (age 86); Montgomery, Alabama, U.S.

Playing career
- 1960–1962: Alabama
- Position: Guard

Coaching career (HC unless noted)
- 1963–1973: Alabama (assistant)
- 1974–1977: Virginia Tech
- 1978: Mississippi State (AHC/OC)
- 1979: Pittsburgh (AHC/OL)

Head coaching record
- Overall: 21–22–1

Accomplishments and honors

Championships
- National (1961)

Jimmy Sharpe (born October 31, 1939) is an American former college football player and coach. He served as the head football coach at Virginia Polytechnic Institute and State University from 1974 to 1977. He was also an assistant coach at the University of Alabama, under Bear Bryant, and at Mississippi State University. Sharpe graduated Montgomery's Sidney Lanier High School and, in 1974, from the University of Alabama.

== Virginia Tech ==
Sharpe, an 11-year veteran of Bear Bryant's Alabama coaching staff, was hired by the Hokies in 1974 to replace Charlie Coffey, who had been let go following a lackluster performance. He was dismissed in 1977 following a disappointing 3–7–1 season.

== Head coaching record ==
Year	Team	Overall	Conference	Standing	Bowl/playoffs
Virginia Tech Gobblers (NCAA Division I independent) (1974–1977)
1974	Virginia Tech	4–7			
1975	Virginia Tech	8–3			
1976	Virginia Tech	6–5			
1977	Virginia Tech	3–7–1			
Virginia Tech:		21–22–1			
Total:		21–22–1			
