= 1975 South Carolina Gamecocks football team =

American college football season

1975 South Carolina Gamecocks football

Tangerine Bowl, L 7–20 vs. Miami (OH)
- Conference: Independent
- Record: 7–5
- Head coach: Jim Carlen (1st season)
- Defensive coordinator: Richard Bell (1st season)
- Home stadium: Williams–Brice Stadium

1975 NCAA Division I independents football records
	Conf.			Overall
Team	W	L	T	W		L		T
Rutgers		–		9	–	2	–	0
No. 10 Penn State		–		9	–	3	–	0
No. 20 West Virginia		–		9	–	3	–	0
Notre Dame		–		8	–	3	–	0
Virginia Tech		–		8	–	3	–	0
No. 15 Pittsburgh		–		8	–	4	–	0
Boston College		–		7	–	4	–	0
Georgia Tech		–		7	–	4	–	0
Memphis State		–		7	–	4	–	0
Navy		–		7	–	4	–	0
North Texas State		–		7	–	4	–	0
Southern Miss		–		7	–	4	–	0
South Carolina		–		7	–	5	–	0
Colgate		–		6	–	4	–	0
Cincinnati		–		6	–	5	–	0
Hawaii		–		6	–	5	–	0
Syracuse		–		6	–	5	–	0
Temple		–		6	–	5	–	0
Utah State		–		6	–	5	–	0
Dayton		–		5	–	6	–	0
Northeast Louisiana		–		4	–	6	–	1
Tulane		–		4	–	7	–	0
Villanova		–		4	–	7	–	0
Florida State		–		3	–	8	–	0
Air Force		–		2	–	8	–	1
Houston		–		2	–	8	–	0
Miami (FL)		–		2	–	8	–	0
Army		–		2	–	9	–	0
Marshall		–		2	–	9	–	0
Southern Illinois		–		1	–	9	–	1
Holy Cross		–		1	–	10	–	0
Louisville		–		1	–	10	–	0
Rankings from AP Poll

The 1975 South Carolina Gamecocks football team represented the University of South Carolina as an independent in the 1975 NCAA Division I football season. The Gamecocks were led by first-year head coach Jim Carlen and played home games at Williams–Brice Stadium. They finished the season 7–5 overall, but lost the Tangerine Bowl to the Miami Redskins, 20–7.

South Carolina had its first two 1,000-yard rushers in school history: Kevin Long and Clarence Williams. Long eclipsed 1,000 yards in the tenth game of the season against Wake Forest; Williams followed him a week later in the game against Clemson. By 2023, Long's and Williams' final rushing totals in 1975 would remain two of the eight highest single-season rushing totals in program history.

South Carolina's appearance in the Tangerine Bowl was only the third bowl game in school history, and the first since 1969. It would be the first of three bowl games in Carlen's tenure as head coach.

== Schedule ==
Date	Opponent	Rank	Site	TV	Result	Attendance	Source
September 13	Georgia Tech		Williams–Brice Stadium; Columbia, SC		W 23–17	51,428	
September 20	at Duke		Wallace Wade Stadium; Durham, NC		W 24–16	21,500	
September 27	Georgia		Williams–Brice Stadium; Columbia, SC (rivalry)		L 20–28	66,944	
October 4	No. 18 Baylor		Williams–Brice Stadium; Columbia, SC		W 24–13	44,192	
October 11	Virginia		Williams–Brice Stadium; Columbia, SC		W 41–14	51,574	
October 18	at Ole Miss		Mississippi Veterans Memorial Stadium; Jackson, MS		W 35–29	30,107	
October 25	at LSU	No. 20	Tiger Stadium; Baton Rouge, LA		L 6–24	61,445	
November 1	at NC State		Carter Stadium; Raleigh, NC	ABC	L 21–28	48,500	
November 8	Appalachian State		Williams–Brice Stadium; Columbia, SC		L 34–39	47,489	
November 15	Wake Forest		Williams–Brice Stadium; Columbia, SC		W 37–26	37,656	
November 22	Clemson		Williams–Brice Stadium; Columbia, SC (rivalry)		W 56–20	57,197	
December 20	vs. No. 16 Miami (OH)		Tangerine Bowl; Orlando, FL (Tangerine Bowl)		L 7–20	20,247	
Rankings from AP Poll released prior to the game
