= 1975 Sun Bowl =

American college football game

Pittsburgh Panthers	Kansas Jayhawks
(7–4)	(7–4)
Independent	Big Eight
33	19
Head coach: Johnny Majors	Head coach: Bud Moore
AP / Coaches; 20 / NR	AP / Coaches; 19 / 18
	1	2	3	4	Total
Pittsburgh	7	12	0	14	33
Kansas	0	0	7	12	19
- Date: December 26, 1975
- Season: 1975
- Stadium: Sun Bowl
- Location: El Paso, Texas
- MVP: QB Robert Haygood (Pittsburgh)
- Attendance: 30,272

United States TV coverage
- Network: CBS
- Announcers: Paul Hornung and Johnny Morris

The 1975 Sun Bowl was a college football postseason bowl game that featured the Pittsburgh Panthers and the Kansas Jayhawks.

== Background ==
With a surprising fourth-place finish in the Big Eight Conference, the Jayhawks had a highlight victory over eventual national champion Oklahoma (breaking the Sooners' 37-game unbeaten streak), and walloped Missouri 41–24 to clinch the Sun Bowl bid. Head coach Bud Moore (in his first year at Kansas) was named Big Eight Coach of the Year and finished runner-up to Woody Hayes for the Football Writers Association of America's National Coach of the Year award. This was their third bowl appearance in eight seasons and only their fifth ever. The highlight of the season for the Panthers was beating No. 9 Notre Dame in the final game of the season. This was their second bowl game in three years.

== Game summary ==
Kansas had an opportunity to take the lead on an 82-yard touchdown play on an option run by Nolan Cromwell and a pitch to Bill Campfield, but Cromwell's pitch was ruled an illegal forward pass, and the Jayhawks punted soon after. A Panther missed field goal led to Kansas driving to the Pittsburgh 16, but they were stopped short on 4th and inches. Soon after, fullback Elliot Walker caught a pitchout and broke three tackles for sixty yards on his way to a touchdown to make it 7–0 Pittsburgh with 2:11 in the 1st. A penalty on Kansas during a punt return and a Cromwell fumble led to two Tony Dorsett touchdowns, the latter occurring with :26 left in the second quarter. Kansas narrowed the lead with 4 minutes left in the third quarter on a Laverne Smith 55-yard touchdown run that made it 19–7. With 12:49 left in the game, Walker plunged for a two-yard score to make it 26–7. With 6:11 to go, Smith scored on a 17-yard dash to make it 26–13. Quarterback Robert Haygood finished the Pittsburgh scoring with his 7-yard touchdown pass to make it 33–13 with 3:15 to go. By the time Kansas scored on a Scott McMichael pass to Skip Sharp from 38 yards out, there was only 2:02 left as Pittsburgh won their first bowl game since 1937. For the first time ever in a bowl game, a team had three players rush for 100 yards in the same game: Tony Dorsett (142 yards on 27 carries), Eliot Walker (123 yards on 11 carries) and Robert Haygood (101 yards on 14 carries).

== Aftermath ==
Johnny Majors’ Panthers would start the following season ranked No. 9, en route to a national championship. They returned to the Sun Bowl in 1989, while Kansas has not returned since. Kansas started 4-0 in 1976 and earned a #7 national ranking before Cromwell suffered a season-ending knee injury and the Jayhawks slid to a 6-5 finish.

== Statistics ==
Statistics	Pittsburgh	Kansas
First downs	16	19
Yards rushing	372	342
Yards passing	60	76
Total yards	432	418
Punts-Average	5-35	5-37
Fumbles lost	0	2
Interceptions thrown	2	1
Penalties-Yards	10-95	5-25
