= 1975 Army Cadets football team =

American college football season

1975 Army Cadets football
- Conference: Independent
- Record: 2–9
- Head coach: Homer Smith (2nd season)
- Captains: Scott Gillogly; Al Staerke
- Home stadium: Michie Stadium

1975 NCAA Division I independents football records
	Conf.			Overall
Team	W	L	T	W		L		T
Rutgers		–		9	–	2	–	0
No. 10 Penn State		–		9	–	3	–	0
No. 20 West Virginia		–		9	–	3	–	0
Notre Dame		–		8	–	3	–	0
Virginia Tech		–		8	–	3	–	0
No. 15 Pittsburgh		–		8	–	4	–	0
Boston College		–		7	–	4	–	0
Georgia Tech		–		7	–	4	–	0
Memphis State		–		7	–	4	–	0
Navy		–		7	–	4	–	0
North Texas State		–		7	–	4	–	0
Southern Miss		–		7	–	4	–	0
South Carolina		–		7	–	5	–	0
Colgate		–		6	–	4	–	0
Cincinnati		–		6	–	5	–	0
Hawaii		–		6	–	5	–	0
Syracuse		–		6	–	5	–	0
Temple		–		6	–	5	–	0
Utah State		–		6	–	5	–	0
Dayton		–		5	–	6	–	0
Northeast Louisiana		–		4	–	6	–	1
Tulane		–		4	–	7	–	0
Villanova		–		4	–	7	–	0
Florida State		–		3	–	8	–	0
Air Force		–		2	–	8	–	1
Houston		–		2	–	8	–	0
Miami (FL)		–		2	–	8	–	0
Army		–		2	–	9	–	0
Marshall		–		2	–	9	–	0
Southern Illinois		–		1	–	9	–	1
Holy Cross		–		1	–	10	–	0
Louisville		–		1	–	10	–	0
Rankings from AP Poll

The 1975 Army Cadets football team represented the United States Military Academy as an independent during the 1975 NCAA Division I football season. Led by head coach Homer Smith, the team finished with a record of 2–9. The Cadets offense scored 165 points, while the defense allowed 337 points.

== Schedule ==
Date	Opponent	Site	Result	Attendance	Source
September 13	Holy Cross	Michie Stadium; West Point, NY	W 44–7	8,219	
September 20	Lehigh	Michie Stadium; West Point, NY	W 54–32	27,800–27,872	
September 27	Villanova	Michie Stadium; West Point, NY	L 0–10	30,940	
October 4	at Stanford	Stanford Stadium; Stanford, CA	L 14–67	38,500	
October 11	Duke	Michie Stadium; West Point, NY	L 10–21	36,577	
October 18	Pittsburgh	Michie Stadium; West Point, NY	L 20–52	41,195	
October 25	at Penn State	Beaver Stadium; University Park, PA	L 0–31	59,381	
November 1	at Air Force	Falcon Stadium; Colorado Springs, CO (Commander-in-Chief's Trophy)	L 3–33	37,183	
November 8	Boston College	Michie Stadium; West Point, NY	L 0–31	38,863	
November 15	at Vanderbilt	Dudley Field; Nashville, TN	L 14–23	20,315	
November 29	vs. Navy	John F. Kennedy Stadium; Philadelphia, PA (Army–Navy Game)	L 6–30	81,576	

== Game summaries ==
=== Navy ===
On November 29, Navy beat Army by a score of 30–6.

== Roster ==
- Clennie Brundidge, Fr.
- QB Leamon Hall, So.
- RB Jeffery Washington Fr.
- RB Gregory King So.
- QB Hank Drought, Fr.
