= Carl Selmer =

American football player and coach (c.1925–2020)

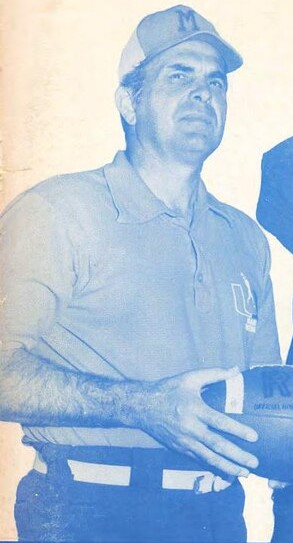
- Selmer in 1976

Biographical details
- Born: June 13, 1925; Hennepin County, Minnesota, U.S.
- Died: November 2020 (aged 95)

Playing career
- 1947: Wyoming

Coaching career (HC unless noted)
- 1948–1956: Worland HS (WY)
- 1957–1961: Wyoming (assistant)
- 1962–1971: Nebraska (assistant)
- 1972–1974: Miami (FL) (OC)
- 1975–1976: Miami (FL)
- 1977: North Texas State (OL)
- 1978–1980: Kansas State (OL)
- 1981: BC Lions (OL)
- 1982–1985: Notre Dame (OL)

Head coaching record
- Overall: 5–16 (college); 80–14–2 (high school)

Carl Frederick Selmer Jr. (June 13, 1925 – November 2020) was an American football player and coach. He was the head coach of the University of Miami football program from 1975 to 1976. Before becoming head coach, he was the offensive coordinator for Miami, and before that, he was the offensive line coach for Nebraska Cornhuskers, helping the Huskers to national championships in 1970 and 1971. While a Cornhusker assistant coach, he was tasked with recruiting in Minnesota.

== Head coaching record ==
=== College ===
Year	Team	Overall	Conference	Standing	Bowl/playoffs
Miami Hurricanes (NCAA Division I independent) (1975–1976)
1975	Miami	2–8			
1976	Miami	3–8			
Miami:		5–16			
Total:		5–16			
