= 1975 Northeast Louisiana Indians football team =

American college football season

1975 Northeast Louisiana Indians football
- Conference: Independent
- Record: 4–6–1
- Head coach: Ollie Keller (4th season)
- Home stadium: Brown Stadium

1975 NCAA Division I independents football records
	Conf.			Overall
Team	W	L	T	W		L		T
Rutgers		–		9	–	2	–	0
No. 10 Penn State		–		9	–	3	–	0
No. 20 West Virginia		–		9	–	3	–	0
Notre Dame		–		8	–	3	–	0
Virginia Tech		–		8	–	3	–	0
No. 15 Pittsburgh		–		8	–	4	–	0
Boston College		–		7	–	4	–	0
Georgia Tech		–		7	–	4	–	0
Memphis State		–		7	–	4	–	0
Navy		–		7	–	4	–	0
North Texas State		–		7	–	4	–	0
Southern Miss		–		7	–	4	–	0
South Carolina		–		7	–	5	–	0
Colgate		–		6	–	4	–	0
Cincinnati		–		6	–	5	–	0
Hawaii		–		6	–	5	–	0
Syracuse		–		6	–	5	–	0
Temple		–		6	–	5	–	0
Utah State		–		6	–	5	–	0
Dayton		–		5	–	6	–	0
Northeast Louisiana		–		4	–	6	–	1
Tulane		–		4	–	7	–	0
Villanova		–		4	–	7	–	0
Florida State		–		3	–	8	–	0
Air Force		–		2	–	8	–	1
Houston		–		2	–	8	–	0
Miami (FL)		–		2	–	8	–	0
Army		–		2	–	9	–	0
Marshall		–		2	–	9	–	0
Southern Illinois		–		1	–	9	–	1
Holy Cross		–		1	–	10	–	0
Louisville		–		1	–	10	–	0
Rankings from AP Poll

The 1975 Northeast Louisiana Indians football team was an American football team that represented Northeast Louisiana University (now known as the University of Louisiana at Monroe) as an independent during the 1975 NCAA Division I football season. In their fourth year under head coach Ollie Keller, the team compiled a 4–6–1 record.

== Schedule ==
Date	Opponent	Site	Result	Attendance	Source
September 6	Pacific (CA)	Brown Stadium; Monroe, LA	T 3–3	8,200	
September 13	Kent State	Brown Stadium; Monroe, LA	L 29–31	8,000	
September 20	Eastern Michigan	Brown Stadium; Monroe, LA	L 24–27	8,300	
September 27	Drake	Brown Stadium; Monroe, LA	W 38–25	7,350	
October 4	vs. Northwestern State	State Fair Stadium; Shreveport, LA (rivalry)	W 34–20	5,060	
October 11	Lamar	Brown Stadium; Monroe, LA	W 34–7	7,800	
October 18	at McNeese State	Cowboy Stadium; Lake Charles, LA	L 14–15	10,000	
October 25	Southeastern Louisiana	Brown Stadium; Monroe, LA	L 19–49		
November 1	West Texas State	Brown Stadium; Monroe, LA	L 20–45		
November 8	at Louisiana Tech	Joe Aillet Stadium; Ruston, LA (rivalry)	L 23–41	16,800	
November 15	Louisville	Brown Stadium; Monroe, LA	W 14–10		
