= 1975 Southern Illinois Salukis football team =

American college football season

1975 Southern Illinois Salukis football
- Conference: Independent
- Record: 1–9–1
- Head coach: Doug Weaver (2nd season)
- Home stadium: McAndrew Stadium

1975 NCAA Division I independents football records
	Conf.			Overall
Team	W	L	T	W		L		T
Rutgers		–		9	–	2	–	0
No. 10 Penn State		–		9	–	3	–	0
No. 20 West Virginia		–		9	–	3	–	0
Notre Dame		–		8	–	3	–	0
Virginia Tech		–		8	–	3	–	0
No. 15 Pittsburgh		–		8	–	4	–	0
Boston College		–		7	–	4	–	0
Georgia Tech		–		7	–	4	–	0
Memphis State		–		7	–	4	–	0
Navy		–		7	–	4	–	0
North Texas State		–		7	–	4	–	0
Southern Miss		–		7	–	4	–	0
South Carolina		–		7	–	5	–	0
Colgate		–		6	–	4	–	0
Cincinnati		–		6	–	5	–	0
Hawaii		–		6	–	5	–	0
Syracuse		–		6	–	5	–	0
Temple		–		6	–	5	–	0
Utah State		–		6	–	5	–	0
Dayton		–		5	–	6	–	0
Northeast Louisiana		–		4	–	6	–	1
Tulane		–		4	–	7	–	0
Villanova		–		4	–	7	–	0
Florida State		–		3	–	8	–	0
Air Force		–		2	–	8	–	1
Houston		–		2	–	8	–	0
Miami (FL)		–		2	–	8	–	0
Army		–		2	–	9	–	0
Marshall		–		2	–	9	–	0
Southern Illinois		–		1	–	9	–	1
Holy Cross		–		1	–	10	–	0
Louisville		–		1	–	10	–	0
Rankings from AP Poll

The 1975 Southern Illinois Salukis football team was an American football team that represented Southern Illinois University (now known as Southern Illinois University Carbondale) as an independent during the 1975 NCAA Division I football season. Under second-year head coach Doug Weaver, the team compiled a 1–9–1 record. The team played its home games at McAndrew Stadium in Carbondale, Illinois.

== Schedule ==
Date	Opponent	Site	Result	Attendance	Source
September 13	at Southwestern Louisiana	Cajun Field; Lafayette, LA	L 10–27	21,223	
September 20	Indiana State	McAndrew Stadium; Carbondale, IL	L 21–23	10,320	
September 27	East Carolina	McAndrew Stadium; Carbondale, IL	L 7–41	8,614	
October 4	Long Beach State	McAndrew Stadium; Carbondale, IL	L 24–31	8,124	
October 11	at Illinois State	Hancock Stadium; Normal, IL	T 17–17	14,000	
October 18	at Northern Illinois^{†}	Huskie Stadium; DeKalb, IL	L 12–52	17,908	
October 25	Wichita State	McAndrew Stadium; Carbondale, IL	W 33–22	11,122	
November 1	Drake	McAndrew Stadium; Carbondale, IL	L 27–38	5,963	
November 8	at Arkansas State	War Memorial Stadium; Little Rock, AR	L 12–35	19,231	
November 15	Bowling Green	McAndrew Stadium; Carbondale, IL	L 6–48		
November 22	at Lamar	Cardinal Stadium; Beaumont, TX	L 10–30	5,702	
^{†}Homecoming
