= 1975 Rhode Island Rams football team =

American college football season

1975 Rhode Island Rams football
- Conference: Yankee Conference
- Record: 2–8 (1–4 Yankee)
- Head coach: Jack Gregory (6th season)
- Home stadium: Meade Stadium

1975 Yankee Conference football standings
	Conf.					Overall
Team	W		L		T	W		L		T
No. 9 New Hampshire $^	5	–	0	–	0	9	–	3	–	0
UMass	4	–	1	–	0	8	–	2	–	0
Connecticut	3	–	2	–	0	4	–	7	–	0
Boston University	1	–	4	–	0	5	–	6	–	0
Maine	1	–	4	–	0	4	–	6	–	0
Rhode Island	1	–	4	–	0	2	–	8	–	0
$ – Conference champion; ^ – NCAA Division II playoff participant; Rankings from Associated Press poll

The 1975 Rhode Island Rams football team was an American football team that represented the University of Rhode Island in the Yankee Conference during the 1975 NCAA Division II football season. In their sixth and final season under head coach Jack Gregory, the Rams compiled a 2–8 record (1–4 against conference opponents) and finished in a tie for last place in the conference. Key players included Little All-American running back Rich Remondino.

== Schedule ==
Date	Opponent	Site	Result	Attendance	Source
September 13	Saint Mary's (NS)*	Cranston Stadium; Cranston, RI	W 33–0	5,111	
September 20	at Northeastern*	Brookline, MA	L 16–21	6,214	
September 27	at Brown*	Brown Stadium; Providence, RI (rivalry)	L 20–41	10,572	
October 4	Maine^{†}	Meade Stadium; Kingston, RI	L 14–23	7,132	
October 11	C.W. Post*	Meade Stadium; Kingston, RI	L 0–3	2,110	
October 18	at UMass	Alumni Stadium; Hadley, MA	L 7–23	5,500–6,500	
October 24	at Boston University	Nickerson Field; Boston, MA	W 21–6	3,300–3,330	
November 1	New Hampshire	Meade Stadium; Kingston, RI	L 6–23	6,123–6,132	
November 8	at Temple*	Veterans Stadium; Philadelphia, PA	L 6–45	11,491	
November 15	Connecticut	Meade Stadium; Kingston, RI (rivalry)	L 10–21	4,723–4,724	
*Non-conference game; ^{†}Homecoming
