= 1975 Utah State Aggies football team =

American college football season

1975 Utah State Aggies football
- Conference: Independent
- Record: 6–5
- Head coach: Phil Krueger (3rd season)
- Home stadium: Romney Stadium

1975 NCAA Division I independents football records
	Conf.			Overall
Team	W	L	T	W		L		T
Rutgers		–		9	–	2	–	0
No. 10 Penn State		–		9	–	3	–	0
No. 20 West Virginia		–		9	–	3	–	0
Notre Dame		–		8	–	3	–	0
Virginia Tech		–		8	–	3	–	0
No. 15 Pittsburgh		–		8	–	4	–	0
Boston College		–		7	–	4	–	0
Georgia Tech		–		7	–	4	–	0
Memphis State		–		7	–	4	–	0
Navy		–		7	–	4	–	0
North Texas State		–		7	–	4	–	0
Southern Miss		–		7	–	4	–	0
South Carolina		–		7	–	5	–	0
Colgate		–		6	–	4	–	0
Cincinnati		–		6	–	5	–	0
Hawaii		–		6	–	5	–	0
Syracuse		–		6	–	5	–	0
Temple		–		6	–	5	–	0
Utah State		–		6	–	5	–	0
Dayton		–		5	–	6	–	0
Northeast Louisiana		–		4	–	6	–	1
Tulane		–		4	–	7	–	0
Villanova		–		4	–	7	–	0
Florida State		–		3	–	8	–	0
Air Force		–		2	–	8	–	1
Houston		–		2	–	8	–	0
Miami (FL)		–		2	–	8	–	0
Army		–		2	–	9	–	0
Marshall		–		2	–	9	–	0
Southern Illinois		–		1	–	9	–	1
Holy Cross		–		1	–	10	–	0
Louisville		–		1	–	10	–	0
Rankings from AP Poll

The 1975 Utah State Aggies football team was an American football team that represented Utah State University as an independent during the 1975 NCAA Division I football season. In their third season under head coach Phil Krueger, the Aggies compiled a 6–5 record and were outscored by opponents by a total of 240 to 193.

== Schedule ==
Date	Time	Opponent	Site	Result	Attendance	Source
September 13		at Utah	Robert Rice Stadium; Salt Lake City, UT (Battle of the Brothers)	W 13–7	26,101	
September 20		at Florida State	Doak Campbell Stadium; Tallahassee, FL	L 8–17	28,685	
September 27		San Diego State	Romney Stadium; Logan, UT	L 10–19	15,768	
October 4		at Texas	Memorial Stadium; Austin, TX	L 7–61	40,130	
October 11		West Texas State	Romney Stadium; Logan, UT	W 21–17	8,849	
October 18		at Weber State	Wildcat Stadium; Ogden, UT	W 30–7	11,503	
October 25		at Arkansas	War Memorial Stadium; Little Rock, AR	L 16–27	44,265	
November 1		Wyoming	Romney Stadium; Logan, UT (rivalry)	W 27–21	14,905	
November 8		BYU	Romney Stadium; Logan, UT (rivalry)	L 7–24	21,594	
November 15	1:30 p.m.	at Boise State	Bronco Stadium; Boise, ID	W 42–19	20,000	
November 22		at Colorado State	Hughes Stadium; Fort Collins, CO	W 28–17	11,872	
All times are in Mountain time

== Roster ==
1975 Utah State Aggies football team roster
Players			Coaches
Offense: Pos. / # / Name / Class; RB / 42 / Louis Giammona / Sr	Defense: Pos. / # / Name / Class; MG / 71 / Jim Hough / So	Special teams: Pos. / # / Name / Class	Head coach: Phil Krueger; Coordinators/assistant coaches Legend: (C) Team captain; (S) Suspended; (I) Ineligible; Injured; Redshirt
