= 1975 Boston University Terriers football team =

American college football season

1975 Boston University Terriers football
- Conference: Yankee Conference
- Record: 5–6 (1–4 Yankee)
- Head coach: Paul Kemp (3rd season)
- Home stadium: Nickerson Field

1975 Yankee Conference football standings
	Conf.					Overall
Team	W		L		T	W		L		T
No. 9 New Hampshire $^	5	–	0	–	0	9	–	3	–	0
UMass	4	–	1	–	0	8	–	2	–	0
Connecticut	3	–	2	–	0	4	–	7	–	0
Boston University	1	–	4	–	0	5	–	6	–	0
Maine	1	–	4	–	0	4	–	6	–	0
Rhode Island	1	–	4	–	0	2	–	8	–	0
$ – Conference champion; ^ – NCAA Division II playoff participant; Rankings from Associated Press poll

The 1975 Boston University Terriers football team was an American football team that represented Boston University as a member of the Yankee Conference during the 1975 NCAA Division II football season. In their third season under head coach Paul Kemp, the Terriers compiled a 5–6 record (1–4 against conference opponents), tied for last place in the conference, and were outscored by a total of 220 to 142.

Boston University played its home games on Nickerson Field, which was part of the Case Sports Complex and was formerly known as Braves Field, the home of the Boston Braves.

== Schedule ==
Date	Opponent	Site	Result	Attendance	Source
September 13	at Maine	Alumni Field; Orono, ME	W 31–21	6,453	
September 19	New Hampshire	Nickerson Field; Boston, MA	L 20–21	4,820	
September 27	Northeastern*	Nickerson Field; Boston, MA	L 17–20	5.472	
October 4	at Harvard*	Harvard Stadium; Boston, MA	W 13–9	10,200	
October 11	at UMass	Alumni Stadium; Hadley, MA	L 0–21	2,000	
October 18	at Bucknell*	Memorial Stadium; Lewisburg, PA	W 16–0	7,500	
October 24	Rhode Island	Nickerson Field; Boston, MA	L 6–21	3,300–3,330	
November 1	at Holy Cross*	Fitton Field; Worcester, MA	W 6–0	12,500	
November 7	Connecticut	Nickerson Field; Boston, MA	L 10–52	2,412	
November 15	Rutgers*	Nickerson Field; Boston, MA	L 3–41	2,013	
November 22	at Villanova*	Villanova Stadium; Villanova, PA	W 20–14	5,400	
*Non-conference game
