= 1975 Southern Miss Golden Eagles football team =

American college football season

1975 Southern Miss Golden Eagles football
- Conference: Independent
- Record: 8–3
- Head coach: Bobby Collins (1st season)
- Home stadium: Municipal Stadium (Biloxi); Mississippi Veterans Memorial Stadium

1975 NCAA Division I independents football records
	Conf.			Overall
Team	W	L	T	W		L		T
Rutgers		–		9	–	2	–	0
No. 10 Penn State		–		9	–	3	–	0
No. 20 West Virginia		–		9	–	3	–	0
Notre Dame		–		8	–	3	–	0
Virginia Tech		–		8	–	3	–	0
No. 15 Pittsburgh		–		8	–	4	–	0
Boston College		–		7	–	4	–	0
Georgia Tech		–		7	–	4	–	0
Memphis State		–		7	–	4	–	0
Navy		–		7	–	4	–	0
North Texas State		–		7	–	4	–	0
Southern Miss		–		7	–	4	–	0
South Carolina		–		7	–	5	–	0
Colgate		–		6	–	4	–	0
Cincinnati		–		6	–	5	–	0
Hawaii		–		6	–	5	–	0
Syracuse		–		6	–	5	–	0
Temple		–		6	–	5	–	0
Utah State		–		6	–	5	–	0
Dayton		–		5	–	6	–	0
Northeast Louisiana		–		4	–	6	–	1
Tulane		–		4	–	7	–	0
Villanova		–		4	–	7	–	0
Florida State		–		3	–	8	–	0
Air Force		–		2	–	8	–	1
Houston		–		2	–	8	–	0
Miami (FL)		–		2	–	8	–	0
Army		–		2	–	9	–	0
Marshall		–		2	–	9	–	0
Southern Illinois		–		1	–	9	–	1
Holy Cross		–		1	–	10	–	0
Louisville		–		1	–	10	–	0
Rankings from AP Poll

The 1975 Southern Miss Golden Eagles football team was an American football team that represented the University of Southern Mississippi as an independent during the 1975 NCAA Division I football season. In their first year under head coach Bobby Collins, the team compiled a 8–3 record.

== Schedule ==
Date	Opponent	Site	Result	Attendance	Source
September 13	at Weber State	Wildcat Stadium; Ogden, UT	W 14–10	9,396	
September 20	at Bowling Green	Doyt Perry Stadium; Bowling Green, OH	L 14–16	14,369	
September 27	at Ole Miss	Hemingway Stadium; Oxford, MS	L 8–24	26,700	
October 4	at Mississippi State	Scott Field; Starkville, MS	W 3–7 (forfeit)	29,000	
October 11	at Memphis State	Memphis Memorial Stadium; Memphis, TN (rivalry)	W 21–7	17,337	
October 18	at UT Arlington	Arlington Stadium; Arlington, TX	W 34–7	4,740	
October 25	at Louisiana Tech	Joe Aillet Stadium; Ruston, LA (rivalry)	W 24–14	8,300	
November 1	vs. Lamar	Louisiana Superdome; New Orleans, LA	W 43–3	8,700	
November 15	at No. 5 Alabama	Denny Stadium; Tuscaloosa, AL	L 6–27	58,000	
November 22	Cal State Fullerton^{†}	Municipal Stadium; Biloxi, MS	W 70–0	9,323	
November 29	BYU	Mississippi Veterans Memorial Stadium; Jackson, MS	W 42–14	9,262	
^{†}Homecoming; Rankings from AP Poll released prior to the game

== Roster ==
1975 Southern Miss Golden Eagles football team roster
Players
Coaches
Offense

Pos.	#	Name	Class
TE	10	Wally Ballard	Sr
QB	7	Jeff Bower	Sr
RB	29	Ben Garry	So
G	64	Amos Fowler	So
TE	89	Ricky Palmer	Sr

Defense

Pos.	#	Name	Class
DB	32	Carl Allen	Jr
DE	42	Ben Hale	So
DB	17	Don Law	Jr
DE	99	Reggie Odom	So
DB	43	Norris Thomas	Sr

Special teams

Pos.	#	Name	Class
K, P	89	Ricky Palmer	Sr

Head coach

- Bobby Collins

Coordinators/assistant coaches

Legend

- (C) Team captain
- (S) Suspended
- (I) Ineligible
- Injured
- Redshirt
