= 1975 Arizona State Sun Devils football team =

American college football season

1975 Arizona State Sun Devils football

National champion (Sporting News) Co-national champion (NCF) WAC champion Fiesta Bowl champion

Fiesta Bowl, W 17–14 vs. Nebraska
- Conference: Western Athletic Conference

Ranking
- Coaches: No. 2
- AP: No. 2
- Record: 12–0 (7–0 WAC)
- Head coach: Frank Kush (18th season)
- Defensive coordinator: Larry Kentera (5th season)
- Captains: Mike Haynes; Jim Heilig
- Home stadium: Sun Devil Stadium

1975 Western Athletic Conference football standings
	Conf.					Overall
Team	W		L		T	W		L		T
No. 2 Arizona State $	7	–	0	–	0	12	–	0	–	0
No. 18 Arizona	5	–	2	–	0	9	–	2	–	0
Colorado State	4	–	2	–	0	6	–	5	–	0
BYU	4	–	3	–	0	6	–	5	–	0
New Mexico	4	–	3	–	0	6	–	5	–	0
Utah	1	–	4	–	0	1	–	10	–	0
Wyoming	1	–	6	–	0	2	–	9	–	0
UTEP	0	–	6	–	0	1	–	10	–	0
$ – Conference champion; Rankings from AP Poll

The 1975 Arizona State Sun Devils football team represented Arizona State University in the 1975 NCAA Division I football season. The offense scored 347 points, while the defense allowed 127 points. Led by head coach Frank Kush, the Sun Devils were undefeated in the regular season (11–0), perfect in Western Athletic Conference play (7–0), and won the Fiesta Bowl. After beating Nebraska, 17–14, Kush said, "From the players' standpoint, this was probably the most important game since I have been here. Not only was the game important for the recognition this team will receive, but it also helps gain recognition for the great teams and players we have had here in the past." They finished the season (12–0) overall and were ranked # 2 in both the AP Poll and the Coaches Poll. This remains the highest ranked finish in Arizona State football history in both the AP and Coaches Poll. Despite the AP and Coaches polls ranking ASU as #2, the Sporting News and The National Championship Foundation (both of which were major selection polls at the time) ranked ASU as the #1 team of the nation.

== Schedule ==
Date	Opponent	Rank	Site	Result	Attendance	Source
September 13	Washington*		Sun Devil Stadium; Tempe, AZ	W 35–12	50,194	
September 20	at TCU*	No. 18	Amon G. Carter Stadium; Fort Worth, TX	W 33–10	13,122	
September 27	BYU	No. 13	Sun Devil Stadium; Tempe, AZ	W 20–0	50,944	
October 4	Idaho*	No. 14	Sun Devil Stadium; Tempe, AZ	W 29–3	44,262	
October 11	at New Mexico	No. 11	University Stadium; Albuquerque, NM	W 16–10	20,045	
October 18	at Colorado State	No. 11	Hughes Stadium; Fort Collins, CO	W 33–3	28,191	
October 25	UTEP	No. 11	Sun Devil Stadium; Tempe, AZ	W 24–6	46,257	
November 1	at Utah	No. 10	Robert Rice Stadium; Salt Lake City, UT	W 40–14	15,833	
November 8	Wyoming	No. 10	Sun Devil Stadium; Tempe, AZ	W 21–20	43,038	
November 15	Pacific (CA)*	No. 8	Sun Devil Stadium; Tempe, AZ	W 55–14	43,511	
November 29	No. 12 Arizona	No. 8	Sun Devil Stadium; Tempe, AZ (Territorial Cup)	W 24–21	51,388	
December 26	vs. No. 6 Nebraska*	No. 7	Sun Devil Stadium; Tempe, AZ (Fiesta Bowl)	W 17–14	51,396	
*Non-conference game; Rankings from Coaches' Poll released prior to the game

== Game summaries ==
=== Arizona ===
Team	1	2	3	4	Total
Arizona	0	14	7	0	21
• Arizona State	3	7	7	7	24

- Date: November 29
- Location: Sun Devil Stadium, Tempe, AZ

Scoring summary
1	ASU	Mortensen 32-yard field goal	ASU 3-0
2	ARIZ	Piper 10-yard pass from Hill (Pistor kick)	ARIZ 7-3
2	ARIZ	Hill 10-yard run (Pistor kick)	ARIZ 14-3
2	ASU	Jefferson 8-yard pass from Sproul (Mortensen kick)	ARIZ 14-10
3	ASU	Jefferson 7-yard pass from Sproul (Mortensen kick)	ASU 17-14
3	ARIZ	Randolph 53-yard pass from Hill (Pistor kick)	ARIZ 21-17
4	ASU	Sproul 1-yard run (Mortensen kick)	ASU 24-21

== Roster ==
1975 Arizona State Sun Devils football team roster
Players
Coaches
Offense

Pos.	#	Name	Class
QB	10	Dennis Sproul	So
RB	36	Fred Williams	Jr
WR		John Jefferson	So
WR		Chris DeFrance	Fr
TE		Bruce Hardy	So

Defense

Pos.	#	Name	Class
LB	53	Larry Gordon	Sr
DE	82	Al Harris	Fr
CB	40	Michael Haynes	Sr
S	30	Dan Paschke	So
S	43	Alex Stencel	Sr

Special teams

Pos.	#	Name	Class

Head coach

- Frank Kush

Coordinators/assistant coaches

Legend

- (C) Team captain
- (S) Suspended
- (I) Ineligible
- Injured
- Redshirt

== 1975 team players in the NFL ==
The following players were claimed in the 1976 NFL draft.

Player	Position	Round	Pick	NFL club
Mike Haynes	Defensive back	1	5	New England Patriots
Larry Gordon	Linebacker	1	17	Miami Dolphins
Randy Moore	Defensive tackle	12	334	Denver Broncos
Chris Lorenzen	Defensive tackle	16	438	Cleveland Browns
