= 1975 Idaho Vandals football team =

American college football season

1975 Idaho Vandals football
- Conference: Big Sky Conference
- Record: 4–5–2 (2–2–2 Big Sky)
- Head coach: Ed Troxel (2nd season)
- Offensive coordinator: Dennis Erickson (2nd season)
- Offensive scheme: Veer
- Defensive coordinator: A. J. Christoff (2nd season)
- Base defense: 5–2
- Captains: Bill Keilty; Steve Duncanson; Mike Kramer; John Yarno
- Home stadium: Idaho Stadium

1975 Big Sky Conference football standings
	Conf.					Overall
Team	W		L		T	W		L		T
No. 6 Boise State $^	5	–	0	–	1	9	–	2	–	1
Idaho State	4	–	2	–	0	7	–	3	–	0
Montana State	4	–	2	–	0	5	–	5	–	0
Idaho	2	–	2	–	2	4	–	5	–	2
Montana	3	–	3	–	0	6	–	4	–	0
Weber State	1	–	4	–	1	1	–	9	–	1
Northern Arizona	0	–	6	–	0	1	–	9	–	0
$ – Conference champion; ^ – NCAA Division II playoff participant; Rankings from NCAA Division II AP Poll

The 1975 Idaho Vandals football team represented the University of Idaho in the 1975 NCAA Division I football season. The Vandals were led by second-year head coach Ed Troxel and were members of the Big Sky Conference, then in Division II for football. They played their home games at the Kibbie Dome, an indoor facility on campus in Moscow, Idaho.

== Season ==
With quarterbacks Dave Comstock and Ken Schrom running the veer offense, the Vandals were 4–5–2 overall and 2–2–2 in the Big Sky.

In the Battle of the Palouse, the Vandals suffered an eighth straight loss to neighbor Washington State of the Pac-8, falling 84–27 at Martin Stadium in Pullman on November 15. The score was 56–14 at the half and 77–27 after three quarters. The Cougars went winless in the Pac-8 in 1975 and were 3–8 overall.

This was the first year the Vandals played home games indoors; the Kibbie Dome's arched roof and end walls were constructed in ten months following the 1974 season. Opened in October 1971, it was an unlit outdoor venue known as new Idaho Stadium for four seasons, the last three with artificial turf. Its predecessor Neale Stadium was also without lights, so this was the first season of night football games on campus. The Vandals lost the opener to Idaho State on September 27, and tied Boise State in the dedication game two weeks later.

The two ties this season (Boise State, Weber State) were the last in program history.

== Notable players and coaches ==
Junior center John Yarno was selected in fourth round of the 1977 NFL draft played six seasons with the Seattle Seahawks. Although quarterback Schrom was projected as the starter for 1976 as a redshirt junior, he opted to pursue professional baseball after the 1976 baseball draft. A pitcher, he was a major leaguer for seven seasons and an all-star as a reliever in 1986.

Dennis Erickson, age 28, completed his second year as offensive coordinator, then left for Fresno State; he returned to the UI program in 1982 as head coach.

== Division I ==
Through 1977, the Big Sky was a Division II conference for football, except for Division I member Idaho, which moved down to I-AA in 1978. Idaho maintained its upper division status in the NCAA by playing Division I non-conference opponents (and was ineligible for the Division II postseason).

== Schedule ==
Date	Time	Opponent	Site	Result	Attendance	Source
September 13	5:30 pm	at Arkansas State*	Indian Stadium; Jonesboro, AR	L 6–23	10,122	
September 20	2:30 pm	at Northern Arizona	Lumberjack Stadium; Flagstaff, AZ	W 22–12	10,000	
September 27	8:00 pm	No. 6 Idaho State	Kibbie Dome; Moscow, ID (rivalry)	L 14–29	14,079	
October 4	7:30 pm	at No. 14 (D-I) Arizona State*	Sun Devil Stadium; Tempe, AZ	L 3–29	44,262	
October 11	1:30 pm	No. 4 Boise State	Kibbie Dome; Moscow, ID (rivalry)	T 31–31	16,250	
October 18	12:30 pm	at No. 13 Montana	Dornblaser Field; Missoula, MT (rivalry)	L 3–14	7,800	
October 25	8:15 pm	at UNLV*	Las Vegas Stadium; Las Vegas, NV	W 39–7	12,451	
November 1	8:00 pm	Montana State^{†}	Kibbie Dome; Moscow, ID	W 41–23	13,425	
November 8	12:30 pm	at Weber State	Wildcat Stadium; Ogden, UT	T 40–40	3,866	
November 15	1:30 pm	at Washington State*	Martin Stadium; Pullman, WA (Battle of the Palouse)	L 27–84	17,300	
November 22	8:00 pm	Northern Illinois*	Kibbie Dome; Moscow, ID	W 25–24	7,345	
*Non-conference game; ^{†}Homecoming; Rankings from AP Poll released prior to the game; All times are in Pacific time

== Roster ==
1975 Idaho Vandals football team roster
Players
Coaches
Offense

Pos.	#	Name	Class
QB	10	Ken Schrom	So
QB, P	12	Rocky Tuttle	Fr
QB	14	Dave Comstock	Sr
SE	18	Kirk Allen	Fr
F, P	22	Bob Cheek	Fr
RB	23	Monty Nash	Sr
RB	25	Robert Brooks	So
RB	30	Tim Lappano	Fr
RB	40	Robert Taylor	So
FB	44	J.C. Chadband	Sr
FB	45	Kevin McAfee	Jr
C	56	John Yarno (C)	Jr
RG	51	Mike Kramer (C)	Sr
RT	62	John Adams	Sr
OL	65	Joe Dahlin	So
LG	68	Clarence Hough	Jr
OL	74	Dave Wiggum	So
OL	76	Greg Kittrell	Jr
LT	78	Wil Overgaard	Jr
TE	80	Mike Hagadone	Fr
TE	82	Steve Duncanson (C)	Sr
SE	83	Tim Coles	Sr
TE	84	Rick Mayfield	Fr

Defense

Pos.	#	Name	Class
FS, PK	11	Bill Keilty (C)	Sr
CB	26	Greg Coman	So
CB	27	Chuck Love	Sr
SS	37	Barry Hopkins	Jr
CB	42	Bill Clark	Jr
CB	43	Brian Charles	So
LB	54	Bob Cafferty	Fr
DE	55	Jeff Phister	Jr
LB	58	Kjel Kiilsgaard	Jr
LB	59	John Kirtland	Jr
DE	60	Rick Sullivan	Jr
LB	61	Mike Siva	Sr
LB	66	Ken Petticolas	Jr
NG	67	Dave Gallick	Sr
DT	72	Joe Pellegrini	So
DL	73	Tom Eilertson	So
DT	75	Lynn Rice	So
DT	77	Craig Crnick	Sr
DE	81	Doug Fisher	Sr
DE	85	Chris Tormey (injured)	Jr

Special teams

Pos.	#	Name	Class
PK	7	Chuck Filippini	Jr

Head coach

- Ed Troxel

Coordinators/assistant coaches

- Dennis Erickson (OC)
- Andy Christoff (DC)
- John McMahon (OL)

Legend

- (C) Team captain
- (S) Suspended
- (I) Ineligible
- Injured
- Redshirt

== All-conference ==
Four Vandal seniors were named to the Big Sky all-conference team: quarterback Dave Comstock, fullback J.C. Chadband, tight end Steve Duncanson, and defensive back Bill Keilty. Chadband and Duncanson were repeat selections and were chosen unanimously. The second team included center John Yarno, tackle Wil Overgaard, split end Tim Coles, and linebacker Mike Siva.

Comstock was the runner-up for conference MVP, a single vote behind running back John Smith of Boise State.

== NFL draft ==
One Vandal senior was selected in the 1976 NFL draft, which lasted 17 rounds (487 selections).

Player	Position	Round	Overall	Franchise
Craig Crnick	DE	13th	367	Oakland Raiders
