= 1975 Colorado State Rams football team =

American college football season

1975 Colorado State Rams football
- Conference: Western Athletic Conference
- Record: 6–5 (4–2 WAC)
- Head coach: Sark Arslanian (3rd season)
- Offensive coordinator: John Beake (1st season)
- Defensive coordinator: Charles Armey (3rd season)
- Home stadium: Hughes Stadium

1975 Western Athletic Conference football standings
	Conf.					Overall
Team	W		L		T	W		L		T
No. 2 Arizona State $	7	–	0	–	0	12	–	0	–	0
No. 18 Arizona	5	–	2	–	0	9	–	2	–	0
Colorado State	4	–	2	–	0	6	–	5	–	0
BYU	4	–	3	–	0	6	–	5	–	0
New Mexico	4	–	3	–	0	6	–	5	–	0
Utah	1	–	4	–	0	1	–	10	–	0
Wyoming	1	–	6	–	0	2	–	9	–	0
UTEP	0	–	6	–	0	1	–	10	–	0
$ – Conference champion; Rankings from AP Poll

The 1975 Colorado State Rams football team was an American football team that represented Colorado State University in the Western Athletic Conference (WAC) during the 1975 NCAA Division I football season. In its second season under head coach Sark Arslanian, the team compiled a 6–5 record (4–2 against WAC opponents). Colorado State's senior quarterback, Mark Driscoll, passed for 1,246 yards and 4 touchdowns.

== Schedule ==
Date	Opponent	Site	Result	Attendance	Source
September 13	at No. 12 Texas*	Memorial Stadium; Austin, TX	L 0–46	46,400	
September 20	BYU	Hughes Stadium; Fort Collins, CO	W 21–17	27,491	
September 27	at New Mexico	University Stadium; Albuquerque, NM	W 27–16	24,743	
October 4	at Wyoming	War Memorial Stadium; Laramie, WY (rivalry)	W 3–0	20,576	
October 11	at Oregon State*	Parker Stadium; Corvallis, OR	W 17–8	20,688	
October 18	No. 11 Arizona State^{†}	Hughes Stadium; Fort Collins, CO	L 3–33	28,191	
October 25	Air Force*	Hughes Stadium; Fort Collins, CO (rivalry)	W 47–10	20,058	
November 1	at Tennessee*	Neyland Stadium; Knoxville, TN	L 7–28	71,579	
November 8	at UTEP	Sun Bowl; El Paso, TX	W 21–17	11,150	
November 15	No. 12 Arizona	Hughes Stadium; Fort Collins, CO	L 9–31	19,887	
November 22	Utah State	Hughes Stadium; Fort Collins, CO	L 17–28	11,872	
*Non-conference game; ^{†}Homecoming; Rankings from AP Poll released prior to the game

== Roster ==
1975 Colorado State Rams football team roster
Players
Coaches
Offense

Pos.	#	Name	Class
OT	78	Al Baker	So
WR	11	Mark Bell	Fr
QB	12	Mark Driscoll	Sr
WR	19	Jeff Schrecengost	Sr

Defense

Pos.	#	Name	Class
LB	88	Mark Bell	Fr
DT	78	Mike Bell	Fr
DB	48	Jerome Dove	Sr
LB	3	Kevin McLain	Sr

Special teams

Pos.	#	Name	Class

Head coach

- Sark Arslanian

Coordinators/assistant coaches

Legend

- (C) Team captain
- (S) Suspended
- (I) Ineligible
- Injured
- Redshirt

== Team players in the NFL ==
Player	Position	Round	Pick	NFL club
Kevin McLain	Linebacker	1	26	Los Angeles Rams
Jerome Dove	Defensive Back	8	220	Oakland Raiders
Melvin Washington	Defensive Back	11	292	Tampa Bay Buccaneers
