= 1975 Boise State Broncos football team =

American college football season

1975 Boise State Broncos football
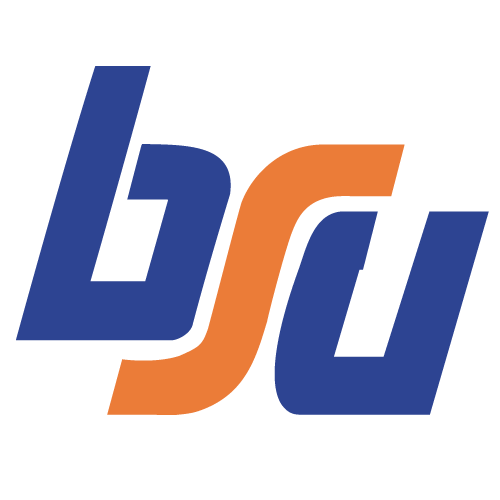

Big Sky champion

NCAA Division II Quarterfinal, L 21–24 vs. Northern Michigan
- Conference: Big Sky Conference

Ranking
- AP: No. 6
- Record: 9–2–1 (5–0–1 Big Sky)
- Head coach: Tony Knap (8th season)
- Home stadium: Bronco Stadium

1975 Big Sky Conference football standings
	Conf.					Overall
Team	W		L		T	W		L		T
No. 6 Boise State $^	5	–	0	–	1	9	–	2	–	1
Idaho State	4	–	2	–	0	7	–	3	–	0
Montana State	4	–	2	–	0	5	–	5	–	0
Idaho	2	–	2	–	2	4	–	5	–	2
Montana	3	–	3	–	0	6	–	4	–	0
Weber State	1	–	4	–	1	1	–	9	–	1
Northern Arizona	0	–	6	–	0	1	–	9	–	0
$ – Conference champion; ^ – NCAA Division II playoff participant; Rankings from NCAA Division II AP Poll

The 1975 Boise State Broncos football team represented Boise State University during the 1975 NCAA Division II football season, the eighth season of Bronco football (at the four-year level) and the third in the newly reorganized Division II. The Broncos were in their sixth year as members of the Big Sky Conference (and NCAA) and played their home games on campus at Bronco Stadium in Boise, Idaho.

Prior to the season, the stadium was expanded with an upper deck added to the east grandstand, which increased the permanent seating capacity to 20,000. Part of the original design, it had been delayed for five years due to high costs. Attendance records for the venue were set in each of the first four home games.

== Season ==
Led by eighth-year head coach Tony Knap, the Broncos were 9–1–1 in the regular season and undefeated in conference (5–0–1), gaining their third straight Big Sky title. For those three seasons, the Broncos were 17–0–1 (.972) in conference play; the only non-victory was a tie at rival Idaho during the Kibbie Dome dedication game in October. Prior to the regular season finale at Idaho State, it was announced that the winner would gain one of the eight playoff berths; BSU won by three to advance to the postseason.

== Playoffs ==
Invited again to the eight-team Division II playoffs, sixth ranked BSU hosted #5 Northern Michigan at Bronco Stadium in the quarterfinals on November 29. Cold and windy conditions caused fourteen fumbles, nine by BSU, and the visitors won 24–21. Winless the previous season, the Wildcats went on to win the national title; they were led by sophomore quarterback Steve Mariucci, later a head coach in the NFL for nine seasons.

	1	2	3	4	Total
N. Michigan	3	0	14	7	24
Broncos	7	0	7	7	21

It was the third consecutive year that the Broncos fell in the playoffs to the eventual national champion, and it was their last appearance in the D-II playoffs. Boise State won the Big Sky title in 1977 but could not participate in the playoffs because of a late regular season game, and they moved up to the new Division I-AA in 1978. BSU returned to the postseason in 1980 and won its only national title.

== Knap departs ==
Two months later in January 1976, 61-year-old Knap moved south to Nevada-Las Vegas to replace Ron Meyer, who had left for SMU in Dallas. At the time, UNLV was also in Division II, but moved up to I-A in 1978; Knap led the Rebels for six seasons, through 1981. Jim Criner, the linebackers coach at Rose Bowl champion UCLA, was hired as BSU's next head coach in February 1976, and stayed through 1982.

== Schedule ==
Date	Time	Opponent	Rank	Site	TV	Result	Attendance	Source
September 13	7:30 pm	Cal State Hayward*		Bronco Stadium; Boise, ID		W 42–20	18,046	
September 20	7:30 pm	Cal Poly*		Bronco Stadium; Boise, ID		W 35–29	18,988	
September 27	7:30 pm	at Weber State	No. 3	Wildcat Stadium; Ogden, UT		W 34–7	11,342	
October 4	7:30 pm	Montana State	No. 3	Bronco Stadium; Boise, ID		W 35–34	19,642	
October 11	2:30 pm	at Idaho	No. 4	Kibbie Dome; Moscow, ID (rivalry)		T 31–31	16,250	
October 18	7:30 pm	UNLV*	No. 7	Bronco Stadium; Boise, ID		W 34–21	20,000	
October 25	7:30 pm	Northern Arizona	No. 5	Bronco Stadium; Boise, ID		W 48–0	13,545	
November 1	1:30 pm	Montana	No. 4	Bronco Stadium; Boise, ID		W 39–28	19,171	
November 8		at Nevada*	No. 3	Mackay Stadium; Reno, NV (rivalry)		W 49–6	5,150	
November 15	1:30 pm	Utah State*^{†}	No. 3	Bronco Stadium; Boise, ID		L 19–42	20,000	
November 22	8:00 pm	at Idaho State	No. 7	ASISU Minidome; Pocatello, ID	KBCI	W 20–17	12,000	
November 29	12:30 pm	No. 5 Northern Michigan*	No. 6	Bronco Stadium; Boise, ID (D-II Quarterfinal)		L 21–24	17,347	
*Non-conference game; ^{†}Homecoming; Rankings from AP Poll released prior to the game; All times are in Mountain time

== Roster ==
1975 Boise State Broncos football team roster
Players
Coaches
Offense

Pos.	#	Name	Class
QB	15	Lee Huey	Sr
QB	18	Greg Stern	Jr
FB		Kent Hollingsworth
RB	28	Tom Sims
RB	34	Bob Cleveland
RB	40	John Smith
RB		Ron Emry
WR	8	John Crabtree
WR	20	Mike Holton
WR		Clarence Smith
OT		Mike Gasseling
G		Glenn Sparks
C		Todd Whiteman
G		Jim Ryan
OT		Everett Carr

Defense

Pos.	#	Name	Class
RCB	7	Lester McNeary	Jr
LCB	21	Gary Roslowich	Jr
LLB	39	Gary Gorrell	Sr
DB	43	Jim Meeks	Sr
SS	46	Jeff Tryon
FS	49	Clint Sigman	Sr
MLB	51	Kauhi Hookano
RLB	52	Barry Munson
LDE	86	Mark Humpheries
LDT	88	Pete Poumele
RDT	73	Saia Misa
RDE	60	Alva Liles

Special teams

Pos.	#	Name	Class
K		Avi Rofe	Jr

Head coach

- Tony Knap (8th year)

Coordinators/assistant coaches

- Steve Buratto (DL/LB)
- Tom Cruickshank (DB)
- Dave Nickel (OL)
- Adam Rita (RB/WR)

Legend

- (C) Team captain
- (S) Suspended
- (I) Ineligible
- Injured
- Redshirt

== NFL draft ==
Three Broncos were selected in the 1976 NFL draft, which lasted 17 rounds (487 selections).

Player	Position	Round	Overall	Franchise
John Smith	Running back	3rd	75	Dallas Cowboys
Gary Gorrell	Linebacker	16th	448	Buffalo Bills
Jim Meeks	Defensive back	17th	475	Detroit Lions
