= 1975 Arizona Wildcats football team =

American college football season

1975 Arizona Wildcats football
- Conference: Western Athletic Conference

Ranking
- Coaches: No. 13
- AP: No. 18
- Record: 9–2 (5–2 WAC)
- Head coach: Jim Young (3rd season)
- Offensive coordinator: John Mackovic (3rd season)
- Defensive coordinator: Larry Smith (3rd season)
- Home stadium: Arizona Stadium

1975 Western Athletic Conference football standings
	Conf.					Overall
Team	W		L		T	W		L		T
No. 2 Arizona State $	7	–	0	–	0	12	–	0	–	0
No. 18 Arizona	5	–	2	–	0	9	–	2	–	0
Colorado State	4	–	2	–	0	6	–	5	–	0
BYU	4	–	3	–	0	6	–	5	–	0
New Mexico	4	–	3	–	0	6	–	5	–	0
Utah	1	–	4	–	0	1	–	10	–	0
Wyoming	1	–	6	–	0	2	–	9	–	0
UTEP	0	–	6	–	0	1	–	10	–	0
$ – Conference champion; Rankings from AP Poll

The 1975 Arizona Wildcats football team represented the University of Arizona in the Western Athletic Conference (WAC) during the 1975 NCAA Division I football season. In their third season under head coach Jim Young, the Wildcats compiled a 9–2 record (5–2 against WAC opponents), finished in second place in the WAC, were ranked No. 18 in the final AP Poll, and outscored their opponents, 330 to 169. The team played its home games at Arizona Stadium in Tucson, Arizona.

Even though they captured their second straight nine-win season, the Wildcats missed out on a bowl due to not winning an outright conference title for the third season in a row. Arizona lost in the season finale to their rival Arizona State in a game that decided the WAC title. Both of Arizona's losses this season were to their rivals, (New Mexico and Arizona State).

The team's statistical leaders included Bruce Hill with 1,747 passing yards, Dave Randolph with 657 rushing yards, and Scott Piper with 718 receiving yards. Linebacker Obra Erby led the team with 188 total tackles.

== Schedule ==
Date	Opponent	Rank	Site	Result	Attendance	Source
September 20	Pacific (CA)*	No. 17	Arizona Stadium; Tucson, AZ	W 16–0	37,720	
September 27	at Wyoming	No. 15	War Memorial Stadium; Laramie, WY	W 14–0	21,909	
October 4	Northwestern*	No. 17	Arizona Stadium; Tucson, AZ	W 41–6	38,501	
October 11	at UTEP	No. 17	Sun Bowl; El Paso, TX	W 36–0	15,700	
October 18	Texas Tech*	No. 13	Arizona Stadium; Tucson, AZ	W 32–28	39,854	
October 25	New Mexico	No. 13	Arizona Stadium; Tucson, AZ (rivalry)	L 34–44	35,878	
November 1	at BYU	No. 17	Cougar Stadium; Provo, UT	W 36–20	25,287	
November 8	at No. 13 San Diego State*	No. 15	San Diego Stadium; San Diego, CA	W 31–24	53,611	
November 15	at Colorado State	No. 12	Hughes Stadium; Fort Collins, CO	W 31–9	19,887	
November 22	Utah	No. 11	Arizona Stadium; Tucson, AZ	W 38–14	37,966	
November 29	at No. 8 Arizona State	No. 12	Sun Devil Stadium; Tempe, AZ (rivalry)	L 21–24	51,388	
*Non-conference game; Rankings from AP Poll released prior to the game

== Before the season ==
Arizona concluded the 1974 season with a 9–2 record (6–1 in WAC), and lost out on the WAC title and bowl eligibility due to their loss to BYU that season. The Wildcats ended the year by defeating Arizona State for the first time since 1964 with a shutout and brought back bragging rights for the state of Arizona. The team went into the 1975 season with high expectations and was looking to contend for the WAC championship and was ranked in the top 20 in preseason polls. Many Wildcat fans believed that Young was rebuilding a resurgence of winning to a football program that was struggling for nearly a decade.

== Game summaries ==
=== Northwestern ===
In a game that featured two teams that shared the same nickname, the Wildcats, Arizona took care of Northwestern at home. Arizona gave up two field goals to Northwestern, and ended a streak of three consecutive shutout wins dating back to the previous season finale against Arizona State (Arizona began 1975 with shutouts over Pacific and Wyoming).

=== New Mexico ===
In the rivalry game between Arizona and New Mexico, both teams’ offense put up several points on the board, with the Lobos coming out on top to upset the Wildcats and handed Arizona its first loss of the season. The Wildcats’ loss led to the Kit Carson Rifle (the rivalry's trophy) returning to Albuquerque for the first time since 1971.

=== San Diego State ===
Arizona faced San Diego State on the road for a top-15 non-conference matchup (the Wildcats were ranked 15th whereas the Aztecs were 13th). The game was a big test for Arizona, and the Wildcats ultimately prevailed in a close win.

=== Colorado State ===
Against Colorado State, the Wildcats’ defense blitzed the Rams and limited them to only nine points in yet another win. This remains the last time to date that Arizona traveled to Fort Collins to play the Rams, as future meetings between the two teams since then have been played in Tucson.

=== Arizona State ===
The Wildcats traveled to Tempe to face unbeaten Arizona State in a game that decided the WAC championship and a berth in the Fiesta Bowl (the loser would have their season end due to a lack of bowl spots available). Due to the fact that cable and satellite television didn't exist at the time and that all national broadcasters’ schedules of games were booked, the Arizona-Arizona State game was not televised.

Late in the second quarter with Arizona leading 14–3, the Sun Devils drove into Wildcat territory and an Arizona State receiver dove and made a sensational catch in the end zone for a touchdown. There has been debates of whether or not it was indeed a catch, in which many Wildcat fans believe it was not. Due to a lack of instant replay at the time and that all officials’ calls were based on judgment and thus were final, the touchdown catch was upheld, much to the ire of Wildcat fans. The disputes of the ASU touchdown catch still continue to this day.

The touchdown gave ASU momentum at halftime and carried it with them in the second half and took the lead. The Wildcats had a chance to respond, but fell short and Arizona State went on to capture the WAC with the win and ended the Wildcats’ season. Arizona matched the 1974 season with back-to-back 9–2 records but without a bowl appearance. Arizona State would ultimately go on to win the Fiesta Bowl and finish with a perfect 12–0 record.

== Roster ==
1975 Arizona Wildcats football team roster
Players
Coaches
Offense

Pos.	#	Name	Class
QB	7	Bill Baechler	Jr
QB	11	Scott Baker	So
WR	18	Theo Bell	Sr
RB	4	Derral Davis	Sr
WR	23	Keith Hartwig	Jr
RB	22	Gerhard Hoentsch	Jr
QB	1	Bruce Hill	Sr
TE	88	Bob Howard	Sr
G	65	Tom Meyer	Jr
OT	76	Brian Murray	Sr
G	62	Bill Parks	Sr
WR	86	Scott Piper	Sr
OT	75	Duane Swanson	So
C	51	Bob Toon	Sr

Defense

Pos.	#	Name	Class
DE	85	Bill Baker	Sr
DE	83	Willis Barrett	Sr
DT	77	Mike Dawson	Sr
S	38	Tom Gallagher	So
DT	72	Rich Hall	Sr
LB	41	Mark Jacobs	Jr
DB	16	Joe O'Sullivan	Sr
DT	78	Grant Swanson	Sr
LB	48	Larry Yena	So

Special teams

Pos.	#	Name	Class
K	13	Lee Pistor	So

Head coach

- Jim Young

Coordinators/assistant coaches

Legend

- (C) Team captain
- (S) Suspended
- (I) Ineligible
- Injured
- Redshirt
