= 1975 UNLV Rebels football team =

American college football season

1975 UNLV Rebels football
- Conference: Independent
- Record: 7–4
- Head coach: Ron Meyer (3rd season)
- Offensive coordinator: Larry Kennan (3rd season)
- Defensive coordinator: Steve Sidwell (2nd season)
- Captains: Marlon Beavers; Mike Otto; Joe Ingersoll; Bob Chess; Mike Haverty
- Home stadium: Las Vegas Stadium

1975 NCAA Division II independents football records
	Conf.			Overall
Team	W	L	T	W		L		T
No. 2 Northern Michigan ^		–		13	–	1	–	0
American International		–		8	–	1	–	0
Lehigh ^		–		9	–	3	–	0
Delaware		–		8	–	3	–	0
Portland State		–		8	–	3	–	0
Akron		–		7	–	4	–	0
Kentucky State		–		7	–	4	–	0
UNLV		–		7	–	4	–	0
Santa Clara		–		6	–	5	–	0
Tennessee State		–		5	–	4	–	0
Youngstown State		–		5	–	4	–	0
Chattanooga		–		5	–	5	–	1
Bucknell		–		5	–	5	–	0
Indiana State		–		5	–	5	–	0
Lafayette		–		5	–	5	–	0
Southern Connecticut State		–		5	–	5	–	0
Central Connecticut		–		4	–	5	–	0
Central State (OH)		–		4	–	6	–	0
Eastern Michigan		–		4	–	6	–	0
Eastern Illinois		–		3	–	5	–	2
Illinois College		–		3	–	6	–	0
Northeastern		–		3	–	6	–	0
Western Carolina		–		3	–	7	–	0
Nevada		–		3	–	8	–	0
Nebraska–Omaha		–		2	–	9	–	0
Arkansas–Pine Bluff		–		0	–	11	–	0
^ – NCAA Division II playoff participant; Rankings from AP Poll

The 1975 UNLV Rebels football team was an American football team that represented the University of Nevada, Las Vegas as an independent during the 1975 NCAA Division II football season. In their third and final year under head coach Ron Meyer, the team compiled a 7–4 record; all four losses were to teams from the Big Sky Conference.

Two months after the season, Meyer departed for Southern Methodist University in Dallas, and was succeeded by Tony Knap, the head coach at Boise State.

== Schedule ==
Date	Opponent	Site	Result	Attendance	Source
September 13	Northern Iowa	Las Vegas Stadium; Whitney, NV	W 48–10	13,885	
September 20	at Idaho State	ASISU Minidome; Pocatello, ID	L 7–15	10,500–10,510	
September 27	at Montana	Dornblaser Field; Missoula, MT	L 20–21	7,800	
October 4	No. 5 Jackson State	Las Vegas Stadium; Whitney, NV	W 39–2	15,000–15,178	
October 11	Nebraska–Omaha	Las Vegas Stadium; Whitney, NV	W 35–6	13,924	
October 18	at No. 7 Boise State	Bronco Stadium; Boise, ID	L 21–34	20,000	
October 25	Idaho^{†}	Las Vegas Stadium; Whitney, NV	L 9–39	12,451	
November 1	Northern Arizona	Las Vegas Stadium; Whitney, NV	W 34–21	9,048	
November 8	South Dakota State	Las Vegas Stadium; Whitney, NV	W 38–23	10,085	
November 15	Weber State	Las Vegas Stadium; Whitney, NV	W 38–14	9,530	
November 22	at Nevada	Mackay Stadium; Reno, NV (Fremont Cannon)	W 45–7	5,800	
^{†}Homecoming; Rankings from AP Poll released prior to the game
