= 1975 Cal State Los Angeles Diablos football team =

American college football season

1975 Cal State Los Angeles Diablos football
- Conference: California Collegiate Athletic Association
- Record: 1–7–1 (0–4 CCAA)
- Head coach: Jim Williams (5th season)
- Home stadium: Campus Field

1975 California Collegiate Athletic Association football standings
	Conf.					Overall
Team	W		L		T	W		L		T
UC Riverside $	4	–	0	–	0	7	–	3	–	0
Cal Poly	3	–	1	–	0	6	–	4	–	0
Cal Poly Pomona	2	–	2	–	0	6	–	4	–	1
Cal State Northridge	1	–	3	–	0	4	–	6	–	1
Cal State Los Angeles	0	–	4	–	0	1	–	7	–	1
$ – Conference champion

The 1975 Cal State Los Angeles Diablos football team represented California State University, Los Angeles as a member of the California Collegiate Athletic Association (CCAA) during the 1975 NCAA Division II football season. Led by Jim Williams in his fifth and final season as head coach, the Diablos compiled an overall record of 1–7–1 with a mark of 0–4 in conference play, placing last out of fives teams in the CCAA. The team was outscored 290 to 168 for the season. The Diablos played home games at the Campus Stadium in Los Angeles.

== Schedule ==
Date	Opponent	Site	Result	Attendance	Source
September 20	Southern Utah State*	Campus Field; Los Angeles, CA	L 24–34	2,400–3,000	
September 27	San Francisco State*	Campus Field; Los Angeles, CA	L 14–21	1,500–2,000	
October 4	Whittier*	Campus Field; Los Angeles, CA	T 17–17	2,000	
October 11	UC Riverside	Campus Field; Los Angeles, CA	L 30–48	1,500–3,000	
October 18	at Cal Poly	Mustang Stadium; San Luis Obispo, CA	L 13–24	5,000–5,840	
November 1	at Cal Poly Pomona	Claremont Alumni Field; Claremont, CA	L 21–54	2,500	
November 8	at Azusa Pacific*	Azusa, CA	W 29–12	1,000	
November 15	at Fresno State*	Ratcliffe Stadium; Fresno, CA	L 14–59	5,000–5,354	
November 22	Cal State Northridge	Campus Field; Los Angeles, CA	L 6–21	400–1,500	
*Non-conference game
