= 1975 Montana Grizzlies football team =

American college football season

1975 Montana Grizzlies football
- Conference: Big Sky Conference
- Record: 6–4 (3–3 Big Sky)
- Head coach: Jack Swarthout (9th season)
- Home stadium: Dornblaser Field

1975 Big Sky Conference football standings
| | Conf. | | | | | Overall |
| Team | W | | L | | T | W | | L | | T |
|---|---|---|---|---|---|---|---|---|---|---|
| No. 6 Boise State $^ | 5 | – | 0 | – | 1 | 9 | – | 2 | – | 1 |
| Idaho State | 4 | – | 2 | – | 0 | 7 | – | 3 | – | 0 |
| Montana State | 4 | – | 2 | – | 0 | 5 | – | 5 | – | 0 |
| Idaho | 2 | – | 2 | – | 2 | 4 | – | 5 | – | 2 |
| Montana | 3 | – | 3 | – | 0 | 6 | – | 4 | – | 0 |
| Weber State | 1 | – | 4 | – | 1 | 1 | – | 9 | – | 1 |
| Northern Arizona | 0 | – | 6 | – | 0 | 1 | – | 9 | – | 0 |
$ – Conference champion; ^ – NCAA Division II playoff participant; Rankings from NCAA Division II AP Poll

The 1975 Montana Grizzlies football team was an American football team that represented the University of Montana in the Big Sky Conference during the 1975 NCAA Division II football season. In their ninth year under head coach Jack Swarthout, the team compiled a 6–4 record.

== Schedule ==
| Date | Opponent | Site | Result | Attendance | Source |
|---|---|---|---|---|---|
| September 13 | South Dakota* | Dornblaser Field; Missoula, MT | W 51–17 | 6,100–6,128 | |
| September 27 | UNLV* | Dornblaser Field; Missoula, MT | W 21–20 | 7,800 | |
| October 4 | at Weber State | Wildcat Stadium; Ogden, UT | W 48–12 | 7,409 | |
| October 11 | Idaho State | Dornblaser Field; Missoula, MT | L 7–10 | 9,200 | |
| October 18 | Idaho | Dornblaser Field; Missoula, MT (rivalry) | W 14–3 | 7,800 | |
| October 25 | at Montana State | Reno H. Sales Stadium; Bozeman, MT (rivalry) | L 3–20 | 14,223–14,350 | |
| November 1 | at Boise State | Bronco Stadium; Boise, ID | L 28–39 | 19,171 | |
| November 8 | Portland State* | Dornblaser Field; Missoula, MT | W 33–16 | 5,100 | |
| November 15 | at Northern Arizona | Lumberjack Stadium; Flagstaff, AZ | W 28–22 | 4,200 | |
| November 22 | at Simon Fraser* | Empire Stadium; Vancouver, BC | L 10–24 | 553 | |
*Non-conference game

== Roster ==
1975 Montana Grizzlies football team roster
| Players | | | Coaches |
|---|---|---|---|
| Offense: Pos. / # / Name / Class | Defense: Pos. / # / Name / Class; DT / / Doug Betters / So | Special teams: Pos. / # / Name / Class | Head coach: Jack Swarthout; Coordinators/assistant coaches Legend: (C) Team captain; (S) Suspended; (I) Ineligible; Injured; Redshirt |
