= 1975 Fresno State Bulldogs football team =

American college football season

1975 Fresno State Bulldogs football
- Conference: Pacific Coast Athletic Association
- Record: 5–7 (1–4 PCAA)
- Head coach: J. R. Boone (3rd season)
- Home stadium: Ratcliffe Stadium

1975 Pacific Coast Athletic Association football standings
	Conf.					Overall
Team	W		L		T	W		L		T
San Jose State $	5	–	0	–	0	9	–	2	–	0
Long Beach State	4	–	1	–	0	9	–	2	–	0
San Diego State	3	–	2	–	0	8	–	3	–	0
Pacific (CA)	2	–	3	–	0	5	–	6	–	1
Fresno State	1	–	4	–	0	3	–	8	–	0
Cal State Fullerton	0	–	5	–	0	2	–	9	–	0
$ – Conference champion

The 1975 Fresno State Bulldogs football team represented California State University, Fresno as a member of the Pacific Coast Athletic Association (PCAA) during the 1975 NCAA Division I football season. Led by J. R. Boone in his third and final season as head coach, Fresno State compiled an overall record of 5–7 with a mark of 1–4 in conference play, placing fifth in the PCAA. The Bulldogs played their home games at Ratcliffe Stadium on the campus of Fresno City College in Fresno, California.

== Schedule ==
Date	Opponent	Site	Result	Attendance	Source
September 6	Cal State Fullerton	Ratcliffe Stadium; Fresno, CA	W 49–7	10,143	
September 13	at New Mexico*	University Stadium; Albuquerque, NM	L 0–29	19,139	
September 20	Cal State Northridge*	Ratcliffe Stadium; Fresno, CA	L 7–13	8,528–9,000	
September 27	at Montana State*	Reno H. Sales Stadium; Bozeman, MT	W 34–17	7,350–7,523	
October 4	at Cal Poly*	Mustang Stadium; San Luis Obispo, CA	L 7–24	6,500–7,500	
October 11	San Diego State	Ratcliffe Stadium; Fresno, CA (rivalry)	L 0–29	9,326	
October 18	at Long Beach State	Veterans Stadium; Long Beach, CA	L 17–47	5,850	
October 25	at Pacific (CA)	Pacific Memorial Stadium; Stockton, CA	L 28–45	10,565	
November 1	San Jose State	Ratcliffe Stadium; Fresno, CA (rivalry)	L 7–21	6,979	
November 8	at Wichita State*	Cessna Stadium; Wichita, KS	L 11–28	8,640	
November 15	Cal State Los Angeles*^{†}	Ratcliffe Stadium; Fresno, CA	W 59–14	5,354	
*Non-conference game; ^{†}Homecoming

== Team players in the NFL ==
The following were selected in the 1976 NFL draft.

Player	Position	Round	Overall	NFL Team
Calvin Lane	Defensive back	6	178	San Diego Chargers
Calvin Young	Running back	14	397	Oakland Raiders

The following finished their Fresno State career in 1975, were not drafted, but played in the NFL.

Player	Position	First NFL Team
Jack Wender	Running back	1977 Tampa Bay Buccaneers
