= 1975 Long Beach State 49ers football team =

American college football season

1975 Long Beach State 49ers football
- Conference: Pacific Coast Athletic Association
- Record: 9–2 (4–1 PCAA)
- Head coach: Wayne Howard (2nd season)
- Offensive coordinator: Ron McBride (2nd season)
- Defensive coordinator: Tom Gadd (2nd season)
- Home stadium: Veterans Stadium

1975 Pacific Coast Athletic Association football standings
| | Conf. | | | | | Overall |
| Team | W | | L | | T | W | | L | | T |
|---|---|---|---|---|---|---|---|---|---|---|
| San Jose State $ | 5 | – | 0 | – | 0 | 9 | – | 2 | – | 0 |
| Long Beach State | 4 | – | 1 | – | 0 | 9 | – | 2 | – | 0 |
| San Diego State | 3 | – | 2 | – | 0 | 8 | – | 3 | – | 0 |
| Pacific (CA) | 2 | – | 3 | – | 0 | 5 | – | 6 | – | 1 |
| Fresno State | 1 | – | 4 | – | 0 | 3 | – | 8 | – | 0 |
| Cal State Fullerton | 0 | – | 5 | – | 0 | 2 | – | 9 | – | 0 |
$ – Conference champion

The 1975 Long Beach State 49ers football team represented California State University, Long Beach (Note: The official name of Long Beach State has been California State University, Long Beach since 1972. However, it is still commonly known as Long Beach State.) during the 1975 NCAA Division I football season.

Cal State Long Beach competed in the Pacific Coast Athletic Association. (Note: The Big West Conference was known as the Pacific Coast Athletic Association from its founding in 1969 through 1987.) The team was led by second year head coach Wayne Howard, and played their home games at Veterans Stadium adjacent to the campus of Long Beach City College in Long Beach, California. They finished the season with a record of nine wins, two losses (9–2, 4–1 PCAA).

== Schedule ==
| Date | Time | Opponent | Site | Result | Attendance | Source |
|---|---|---|---|---|---|---|
| September 6 | 7:30 pm | Southwestern Louisiana* | Veterans Memorial Stadium; Long Beach, CA | L 17–22 | 10,482 | |
| September 13 | 4:30 pm | at Northern Illinois* | Huskie Stadium; DeKalb, IL | W 24–7 | 9,440 | |
| September 20 | 1:00 pm | at Cal State Fullerton | Santa Ana Stadium; Santa Ana, CA | W 32–6 | 3,100 | |
| September 26 | 7:30 pm | Pacific (CA) | Veterans Memorial Stadium; Long Beach, CA | W 28–12 | 6,347 | |
| October 4 | 11:30 am | at Southern Illinois* | McAndrew Stadium; Carbondale, IL | W 31–24 | 8,124 | |
| October 11 | 7:30 pm | San Jose State | Veterans Memorial Stadium; Long Beach, CA | L 7–30 | 11,874 | |
| October 18 | 7:30 pm | Fresno State | Veterans Memorial Stadium; Long Beach, CA | W 47–17 | 5,850 | |
| October 25 | 11:30 am | at Drake* | Drake Stadium; Des Moines, IA | W 31–10 | 9,470 | |
| November 8 | 7:30 pm | Hawaii* | Veterans Memorial Stadium; Long Beach, CA | W 10–0 | 13,210 | |
| November 15 | 7:30 pm | Cal Poly* | Veterans Memorial Stadium; Long Beach, CA | W 26–24 | 6,775 | |
| November 22 | 7:30 pm | at San Diego State | San Diego Stadium; San Diego, CA | W 21–17 | 36,825 | |
*Non-conference game; All times are in Pacific time

== Team players in the NFL ==
The following were selected in the 1976 NFL draft.

| Player | Position | Round | Overall | NFL team |
| Russ Bolinger | Guard, tackle | 3 | 68 | Detroit Lions |
| Leanell Jones | Tight end | 9 | 253 | Detroit Lions |
| Herb Lusk | Running back | 10 | 273 | Philadelphia Eagles |
