= 1975 Cal Poly Mustangs football team =

American college football season

1975 Cal Poly Mustangs football
- Conference: California Collegiate Athletic Association
- Record: 6–4 (3–1 CCAA)
- Head coach: Joe Harper (8th season)
- Home stadium: Mustang Stadium

1975 California Collegiate Athletic Association football standings
	Conf.					Overall
Team	W		L		T	W		L		T
UC Riverside $	4	–	0	–	0	7	–	3	–	0
Cal Poly	3	–	1	–	0	6	–	4	–	0
Cal Poly Pomona	2	–	2	–	0	6	–	4	–	1
Cal State Northridge	1	–	3	–	0	4	–	6	–	1
Cal State Los Angeles	0	–	4	–	0	1	–	7	–	1
$ – Conference champion

The 1975 Cal Poly Mustangs football team represented California Polytechnic State University, San Luis Obispo as a member of the California Collegiate Athletic Association (CCAA) during the 1975 NCAA Division II football season. Led by eighth-year head coach Joe Harper, Cal Poly compiled an overall record of 6–4 with a mark of 3–1 in conference play, placing second in the CCAA. The Mustangs played home games at Mustang Stadium in San Luis Obispo, California.

== Schedule ==
Date	Opponent	Site	Result	Attendance	Source
September 20	at Boise State*	Bronco Stadium; Boise, ID	L 29–35	18,898–18,988	
September 27	Cal State Fullerton*	Mustang Stadium; San Luis Obispo, CA	W 23–10	5,600–6,500	
October 4	Fresno State*	Mustang Stadium; San Luis Obispo, CA	W 24–7	6,500–7,500	
October 11	at Nevada*	Mackay Stadium; Reno, NV	L 8–16	5,000–5,505	
October 18	Cal State Los Angeles	Mustang Stadium; San Luis Obispo, CA	W 24–13	5,000–5,840	
October 25	at Cal State Northridge	Devonshire Downs; Northridge, CA	W 27–14	2,800–2,873	
November 1	at UC Riverside	Highlander Stadium; Riverside, CA	L 7–10	4,779–4,975	
November 8	No. 9 Idaho State*	Mustang Stadium; San Luis Obispo, CA	W 65–14	7,960	
November 15	at Long Beach State*	Veterans Stadium; Long Beach, CA	L 24–26	6,775	
November 22	Cal Poly Pomona	Mustang Stadium; San Luis Obispo, CA	W 44–6	6,154	
*Non-conference game; Rankings from AP Poll released prior to the game

== Team players in the NFL ==
The following Cal Poly Mustang players were selected in the 1976 NFL draft.

Player	Position	Round	Overall	NFL team
Gary Davis	Running back	6	174	Miami Dolphins
John Henson	Running back	14	386	Green Bay Packers
Ray Hall	Tight end	17	467	Green Bay Packers
