= 1975 Montana State Bobcats football team =

American college football season

1975 Montana State Bobcats football
- Conference: Big Sky Conference
- Record: 5–5 (4–2 Big Sky)
- Head coach: Sonny Holland (5th season)
- Offensive coordinator: Don Christensen (5th season)
- Defensive coordinator: Sonny Lubick (5th season)
- Home stadium: Sales Stadium

1975 Big Sky Conference football standings
	Conf.					Overall
Team	W		L		T	W		L		T
No. 6 Boise State $^	5	–	0	–	1	9	–	2	–	1
Idaho State	4	–	2	–	0	7	–	3	–	0
Montana State	4	–	2	–	0	5	–	5	–	0
Idaho	2	–	2	–	2	4	–	5	–	2
Montana	3	–	3	–	0	6	–	4	–	0
Weber State	1	–	4	–	1	1	–	9	–	1
Northern Arizona	0	–	6	–	0	1	–	9	–	0
$ – Conference champion; ^ – NCAA Division II playoff participant; Rankings from NCAA Division II AP Poll

The 1975 Montana State Bobcats football team was an American football team that represented Montana State University in the Big Sky Conference during the 1975 NCAA Division II football season. In their fifth season under head coach Sonny Holland, the Bobcats compiled a 5–5 record (4–2 against Big Sky opponents) and tied for second place in the Big Sky.

Tailback Steve Kracher became the second player in school history to rush for 1,000 yards in consecutive seasons.

== Schedule ==
Date	Opponent	Site	Result	Attendance	Source
September 6	Portland State*	Sales Stadium; Bozeman, MT	W 35–34	5,100	
September 13	North Dakota*	Sales Stadium; Bozeman, MT	L 10–34	6,322	
September 20	at North Dakota State*	Dacotah Field; Fargo, ND	W 34–14	7,400	
September 27	Fresno State*	Sales Stadium; Bozeman, MT	L 17–34	7,350–7,523	
October 4	at No. 3 Boise State	Bronco Stadium; Boise, ID	L 34–35	19,642	
October 11	Weber State^{†}	Sales Stadium; Bozeman, MT	W 31–14	5,755	
October 18	at No. 4 Idaho State	ASISU Minidome; Pocatello, ID	W 19–7	11,500	
October 25	Montana	Sales Stadium; Bozeman, MT (rivalry)	W 20–3	14,223–14,350	
November 1	at Idaho	Kibbie Dome; Moscow, ID	L 23–41	13,425–13,485	
November 8	at Northern Arizona	Lumberjack Stadium; Flagstaff, AZ	W 31–17	7,000	
*Non-conference game; ^{†}Homecoming; Rankings from AP Poll released prior to the game

== Roster ==
1979 Montana State Bobcats football team roster
Players			Coaches
Offense: Pos. / # / Name / Class; OT / / Jon Borchardt / Fr	Defense: Pos. / # / Name / Class	Special teams: Pos. / # / Name / Class; K / 8 / Pat Bolton / Sr	Head coach: Sonny Holland; Coordinators/assistant coaches Legend: (C) Team captain; (S) Suspended; (I) Ineligible; Injured; Redshirt
