= 1975 Hawaii Rainbow Warriors football team =

American college football season

1975 Hawaii Rainbow Warriors football
- Conference: Independent
- Record: 6–5
- Head coach: Larry Price (2nd season)
- Home stadium: Aloha Stadium

1975 NCAA Division I independents football records
	Conf.			Overall
Team	W	L	T	W		L		T
Rutgers		–		9	–	2	–	0
No. 10 Penn State		–		9	–	3	–	0
No. 20 West Virginia		–		9	–	3	–	0
Notre Dame		–		8	–	3	–	0
Virginia Tech		–		8	–	3	–	0
No. 15 Pittsburgh		–		8	–	4	–	0
Boston College		–		7	–	4	–	0
Georgia Tech		–		7	–	4	–	0
Memphis State		–		7	–	4	–	0
Navy		–		7	–	4	–	0
North Texas State		–		7	–	4	–	0
Southern Miss		–		7	–	4	–	0
South Carolina		–		7	–	5	–	0
Colgate		–		6	–	4	–	0
Cincinnati		–		6	–	5	–	0
Hawaii		–		6	–	5	–	0
Syracuse		–		6	–	5	–	0
Temple		–		6	–	5	–	0
Utah State		–		6	–	5	–	0
Dayton		–		5	–	6	–	0
Northeast Louisiana		–		4	–	6	–	1
Tulane		–		4	–	7	–	0
Villanova		–		4	–	7	–	0
Florida State		–		3	–	8	–	0
Air Force		–		2	–	8	–	1
Houston		–		2	–	8	–	0
Miami (FL)		–		2	–	8	–	0
Army		–		2	–	9	–	0
Marshall		–		2	–	9	–	0
Southern Illinois		–		1	–	9	–	1
Holy Cross		–		1	–	10	–	0
Louisville		–		1	–	10	–	0
Rankings from AP Poll

The 1975 Hawaii Rainbow Warriors football team represented the University of Hawaiʻi at Mānoa as an independent during the 1975 NCAA Division I football season. In their second season under head coach Larry Price, the Rainbow Warriors compiled a 6–5 record.

== Schedule ==
Date	Opponent	Site	Result	Attendance	Source
September 13	Texas A&I	Aloha Stadium; Halawa, HI	L 9–43	32,247	
September 20	Grambling State	Aloha Stadium; Halawa, HI	L 6–20	29,422	
October 4	at Rutgers	Rutgers Stadium; Piscataway, NJ	L 3–7	17,000	
October 18	Portland State	Aloha Stadium; Halawa, HI	W 24–7	20,157	
October 25	Santa Clara^{†}	Aloha Stadium; Halawa, HI	W 48–40	21,133	
November 1	Cal State Fullerton	Aloha Stadium; Halawa, HI	W 16–7	19,178	
November 8	at Long Beach State	Veterans Memorial Stadium; Long Beach, CA	L 0–10	13,210	
November 15	UTEP	Aloha Stadium; Halawa, HI	W 21–9	18,664	
November 22	Pacific (CA)	Aloha Stadium; Halawa, HI	W 17–10	21,208	
November 29	No. 20 San Jose State	Aloha Stadium; Halawa, HI (rivalry)	W 30–20	21,697	
December 4	Tennessee	Aloha Stadium; Halawa, HI	L 6–28	40,585	
^{†}Homecoming; Rankings from Coaches' Poll released prior to the game
