= 1975 UC Davis Aggies football team =

American college football season

1975 UC Davis Aggies football

FWC champion
- Conference: Far Western Conference
- Record: 7–3 (5–0 FWC)
- Head coach: Jim Sochor (6th season)
- Captains: Bill Jenkins; John Silverfoote
- Home stadium: Toomey Field

1975 Far Western Conference football standings
	Conf.					Overall
Team	W		L		T	W		L		T
UC Davis $	5	–	0	–	0	7	–	3	–	0
Humboldt State	4	–	1	–	0	7	–	3	–	0
Sacramento State	2	–	3	–	0	5	–	5	–	0
San Francisco State	2	–	3	–	0	4	–	4	–	1
Chico State	2	–	3	–	0	4	–	6	–	0
Cal State Hayward	0	–	5	–	0	0	–	10	–	0
$ – Conference champion

The 1975 UC Davis Aggies football team represented the University of California, Davis as a member of the Far Western Conference (FWC) during the 1975 NCAA Division II football season. Led by sixth-year head coach Jim Sochor, UC Davis compiled an overall record of 7–3 with a mark of 5–0 in conference play, winning the FWC title for the fifth consecutive season. 1974 was the sixth consecutive winning season for the Aggies. With the 5–0 conference record, they stretched their conference winning streak to 13 games dating back to the 1973 season. The team outscored its opponents 245 to 142 for the season. The Aggies played home games at Toomey Field in Davis, California.

== Schedule ==
Date	Opponent	Rank	Site	Result	Attendance	Source
September 13	at Pacific (CA)*		Pacific Memorial Stadium; Stockton, CA	L 13–31	12,402	
September 20	at UC Riverside*		Highlander Stadium; Riverside, CA	W 31–22	1,700–4,000	
September 27	Cal State Northridge*		Toomey Field; Davis, CA	W 20–3	4,300–6,900	
October 4	Chico State		Toomey Field; Davis, CA	W 31–0	8,400–8,600	
October 11	at Cal State Hayward		Pioneer Stadium; Hayward, CA	W 6–3	1,300	
October 18	Sacramento State		Toomey Field; Davis, CA (rivalry)	W 38–3	9,000–9,100	
October 25	at Humboldt State	No. 10	Redwood Bowl; Arcata, CA	W 20–10	5,000	
November 1	at Santa Clara*	No. 9	Buck Shaw Stadium; Santa Clara, CA	L 28–29	7,456	
November 8	San Francisco State		Toomey Field; Davis, CA	W 37–9	5,600	
November 15	at Portland State*		Civic Stadium; Portland, OR	L 21–32	3,312	
*Non-conference game; Rankings from UPI Poll released prior to the game

== NFL draft ==
The following UC Davis Aggies players were selected in the 1976 NFL draft.

Player	Position	Round	Overall	NFL team
Anthony Terry	Defensive back	17	470	Philadelphia Eagles
