= 1975 San Francisco State Gators football team =

American college football season

1975 San Francisco State Gators football
- Conference: Far Western Conference
- Record: 4–4–1 (2–3 FWC)
- Head coach: Vic Rowen (15th season)
- Home stadium: Cox Stadium

1975 Far Western Conference football standings
	Conf.					Overall
Team	W		L		T	W		L		T
UC Davis $	5	–	0	–	0	7	–	3	–	0
Humboldt State	4	–	1	–	0	7	–	3	–	0
Sacramento State	2	–	3	–	0	5	–	5	–	0
San Francisco State	2	–	3	–	0	4	–	4	–	1
Chico State	2	–	3	–	0	4	–	6	–	0
Cal State Hayward	0	–	5	–	0	0	–	10	–	0
$ – Conference champion

The 1975 San Francisco State Gators football team represented San Francisco State University as a member of the Far Western Conference (FWC) during the 1975 NCAA Division II football season. Led by 15th-year head coach Vic Rowen, San Francisco State compiled an overall record of 4–4–1 with a mark of 2–3 in conference play, placing in a three-way tie for third place in the FWC. For the season the team outscored its opponents 165 to 149. The Gators played home games at Cox Stadium in San Francisco.

== Schedule ==
Date	Opponent	Site	Result	Attendance	Source
September 13	at Cal State Northridge*	Devonshire Downs; Northridge, CA	T 6–6	2,800–3,412	
September 20	at Cal Lutheran*	Mt. Clef Field; Thousand Oaks, CA	L 21–27	2,000–3,800	
September 27	at Cal State Los Angeles*	Campus Field; Los Angeles, CA	W 21–14	1,500–2,000	
October 4	Puget Sound*	Cox Stadium; San Francisco, CA	W 31–3	1,000	
October 11	at Chico State	University Stadium; Chico, CA	L 14–24	2,000–2,500	
October 17	Cal State Hayward	Cox Stadium; San Francisco, CA	W 33–6	800	
October 25	at Sacramento State	Hornet Stadium; Sacramento, CA	W 14–5	1,800–3,500	
November 1	Humboldt State	Cox Stadium; San Francisco, CA	L 16–27	1,000	
November 8	at UC Davis	Toomey Field; Davis, CA	L 9–37	5,600	
*Non-conference game

== Team players in the NFL ==
The following San Francisco State players were selected in the 1976 NFL draft.

Player	Position	Round	Overall	NFL team
Robert Sparks	Defensive back	12	345	Minnesota Vikings
Rick Faulk	Punter	15	410	New York Jets

The following finished their college career in 1975, were not drafted, but played in the NFL.

Player	Position	First NFL team
Bruce Rhodes	Defensive back	1976 San Francisco 49ers
