= Cal State Los Angeles Diablos football =

American college football team

- First season: 1951; 75 years ago
- Last season: 1977; 49 years ago
- Head coach: Ron Hull (final); 2nd season, 9–8–1 (.528)
- Location: Los Angeles, California, U.S.
- Stadium: Campus Field
- Conference: CCAA
- All-time record: 102–139–9 (.426)
- Bowl record: 1–0 (1.000)

Small college national championships
- 1964

Conference championships
- 3

Cal State Los Angeles Diablos football team represented the California State University, Los Angeles from the 1951 season through the 1977 season. Between 1947 and 1963, the university was known as the Los Angeles State College and the athletic teams were known as Los Angeles State. When the university was renamed the California State College at Los Angeles, the athletic teams were re-branded as Cal State Los Angeles. In 1980, the university adopted the current Golden Eagles nickname.

The Diablos competed as the member of the California Collegiate Athletic Association (CCAA) from 1951 through the 1968 season. Between 1969 and 1973 the Diablos were members of the Pacific Coast Athletic Association, before returning to the CCAA for the 1974 and 1975 seasons. They finished their final two seasons as an independent.

They played their home games throughout Los Angeles and played their final season at Campus Field on the university campus. In 27 years, the Diablos compiled an all-time record of 102 wins, 139 losses and 9 ties (102–139–9).

== Seasons ==
Year	Team	Overall	Conference	Standing	Bowl/playoffs	Coaches^{#}	AP^{°}
Leonard Adams (California Collegiate Athletic Association) (1951–1962)
1951	Los Angeles State	1–7	0–4	5th			
1952	Los Angeles State	4–4	1–3	4th			
1953	Los Angeles State	2–7	1–4	T–5th			
1954	Los Angeles State	2–6–1	0–4	5th			
1955	Los Angeles State	3–6	1–1	4th			
1956	Los Angeles State	3–5–1	0–1	4th			
1957	Los Angeles State	5–4	1–1	T–3rd			
1958	Los Angeles State	4–4–1	0–4–1	6th			
1959	Los Angeles State	7–3	3–2	T–2nd			
1960	Los Angeles State	4–3–1	2–2–1	3rd			
1961	Los Angeles State	4–4–1	2–2–1	T–3rd			
1962	Los Angeles State	2–8	0–5	6th			
Adams:		41–61–5	11–32–3				
Homer Beatty (California Collegiate Athletic Association) (1963–1965)
1963	Los Angeles State	7–1	3–1	T–1st			
1964	Cal State Los Angeles	9–0	5–0	1st		1	1
1965	Cal State Los Angeles	9–1	5–0	1st	W Camellia Bowl	2	1
Franz:		25–2	13–1				
Jim Williams (California Collegiate Athletic Association) (1966–1968)
1966	Cal State Los Angeles	4–6	2–3	T–4th			
1967	Cal State Los Angeles	1–9	0–5	6th			
1968	Cal State Los Angeles	3–3	2–2	T–2nd			
Williams:		8–18	4–10				
Walt Thurmond (Pacific Coast Athletic Association) (1969)
1969	Cal State Los Angeles	0–9	0–4	7th			
Thurmond:		0–9	0–4				
Bob Enger (Pacific Coast Athletic Association) (1970)
1970	Cal State Los Angeles	1–9	0–4	7th			
Enger:		1–9	0–4				
Foster Andersen (Pacific Coast Athletic Association) (1971–1973)
1971	Cal State Los Angeles	2–8	0–3	7th			
1972	Cal State Los Angeles	3–7	0–0				
1973	Cal State Los Angeles	4–6–1	0–0				
Anderson:		9–21–1	0–3				
Jim Williams (California Collegiate Athletic Association) (1974–1975)
1974	Cal State Los Angeles	5–4–1	0–3–1	5th			
1975	Cal State Los Angeles	1–7–1	0–4	5th			
Williams:		6–11–2	0–7–1				
Ron Hull (California Collegiate Athletic Association) (1976–1977)
1976	Cal State Los Angeles	5–3–1	0–1	4th			
1977	Cal State Los Angeles	4–5	0–0	NA			
Hull:		9–8–1	0–1				
Total:		102–139–9					
National championship Conference title Conference division title or championship game berth
^{†}Indicates Bowl Coalition, Bowl Alliance, BCS, or CFP / New Years' Six bowl.; ^{#}Rankings from final Coaches Poll.; ^{°}Rankings from final AP Poll.
