= 1975 Utah Utes football team =

American college football season

1975 Utah Utes football
- Conference: Western Athletic Conference
- Record: 1–10 (1–4 WAC)
- Head coach: Tom Lovat (2nd season)
- Offensive coordinator: Jesse Cone (2nd season)
- Defensive coordinator: Don McCaulley (2nd season)
- Home stadium: Robert Rice Stadium

1975 Western Athletic Conference football standings
	Conf.					Overall
Team	W		L		T	W		L		T
No. 2 Arizona State $	7	–	0	–	0	12	–	0	–	0
No. 18 Arizona	5	–	2	–	0	9	–	2	–	0
Colorado State	4	–	2	–	0	6	–	5	–	0
BYU	4	–	3	–	0	6	–	5	–	0
New Mexico	4	–	3	–	0	6	–	5	–	0
Utah	1	–	4	–	0	1	–	10	–	0
Wyoming	1	–	6	–	0	2	–	9	–	0
UTEP	0	–	6	–	0	1	–	10	–	0
$ – Conference champion; Rankings from AP Poll

The 1975 Utah Utes football team was an American football team that represented the University of Utah as a member of the Western Athletic Conference (WAC) during the 1975 NCAA Division I football season. In their second season under head coach Tom Lovat, the Utes compiled an overall record of 1–10 with a mark of 1–4 against conference opponents, placing sixth in the WAC. Home games were played on campus at Robert Rice Stadium in Salt Lake City.

== Schedule ==
Date	Opponent	Site	Result	Attendance	Source
September 13	Utah State*	Robert Rice Stadium; Salt Lake City, UT (rivalry)	L 7–13	26,101	
September 20	Washington State*	Robert Rice Stadium; Salt Lake City, UT	L 14–30	19,622	
September 27	at Indiana*	Memorial Stadium; Bloomington, IN	L 7–21	32,864	
October 4	Iowa State*	Robert Rice Stadium; Salt Lake City, UT	L 3–31	16,096	
October 11	Wyoming	Robert Rice Stadium; Salt Lake City, UT	W 16–13	18,203	
October 18	at New Mexico	University Stadium; Albuquerque, NM	L 23–27	15,010	
October 25	at Oregon*	Autzen Stadium; Eugene, OR	L 7–18	10,500	
November 1	No. 10 Arizona State^{†}	Robert Rice Stadium; Salt Lake City, UT	L 14–40	15,833	
November 8	at Tennessee*	Neyland Stadium; Knoxville, TN	L 7–40	67,437	
November 15	at BYU	Cougar Stadium; Provo, Utah (rivalry)	L 20–51	28,265	
November 22	at No. 11 Arizona	Arizona Stadium; Tucson, AZ	L 14–38	37,966	
*Non-conference game; ^{†}Homecoming; Rankings from AP Poll released prior to the game

== Roster ==
1975 Utah Utes football team roster
Players
Coaches
Offense

Pos.	#	Name	Class
QB	11	Dan Hagemann	Jr

Defense

Pos.	#	Name	Class
LB	58	John Huddleston	Sr
DT	50	Pat Kons	Jr
LB	31	Dave Loden	Jr
DB	46	Roland Solomon	So
DB	21	Terry Taylor	Jr
DB	40	Larry Wall	Jr
DT	78	Mike Webb	Jr

Special teams

Pos.	#	Name	Class
K	90	Mike Brown	Sr
K	27	Craig Buchi	Jr

Head coach

- Tom Lovat

Coordinators/assistant coaches

Legend

- (C) Team captain
- (S) Suspended
- (I) Ineligible
- Injured
- Redshirt

== NFL draft ==
One Ute was selected in the 1976 NFL draft, which lasted 17 rounds (487 selections).

Player	Position	Round	Pick	NFL team
John Huddleston	Linebacker	16	446	Denver Broncos
