= 1975 Fiesta Bowl =

American college football game

- 5th Fiesta Bowl
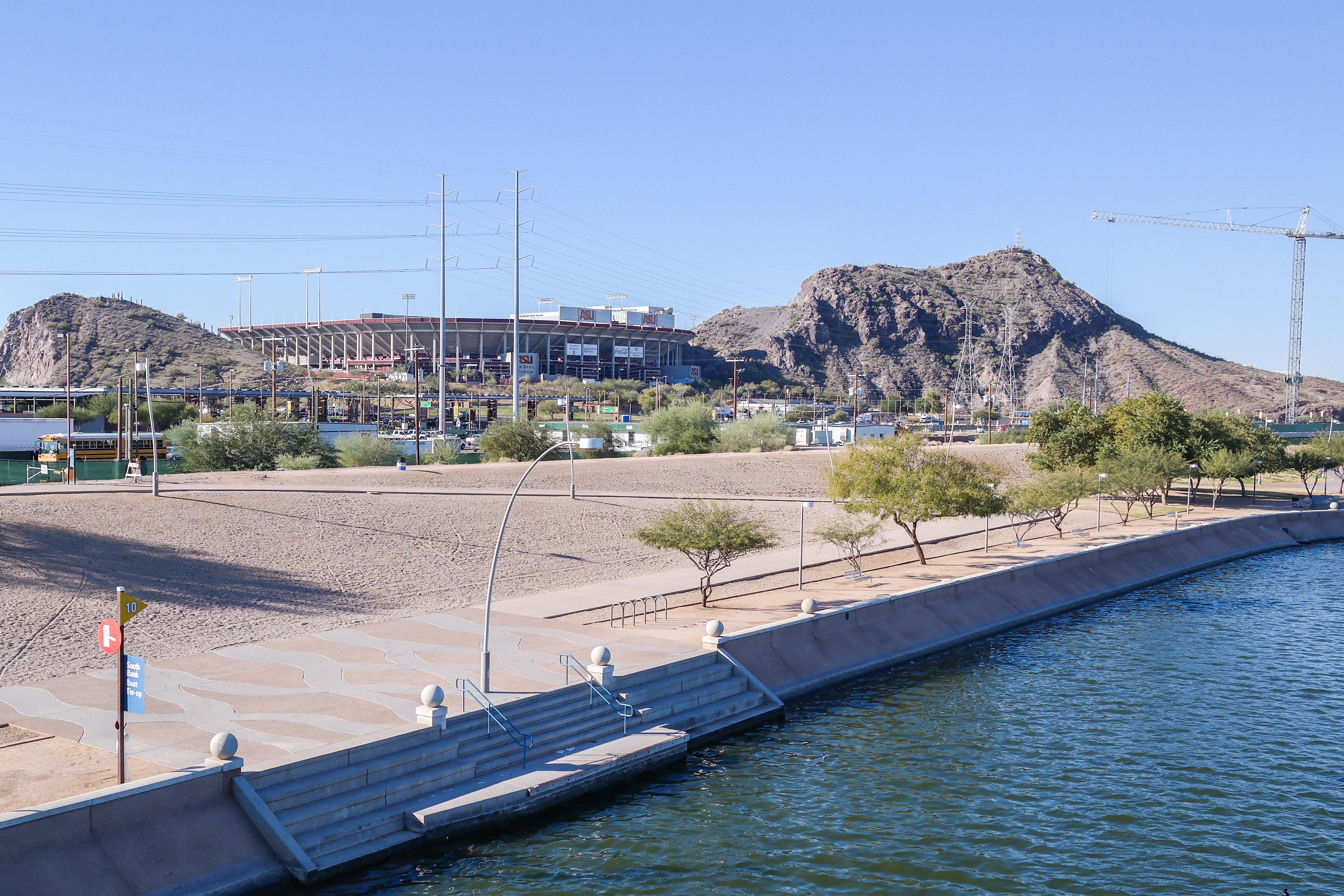
- Sun Devil Stadium in Tempe, Arizona, hosted the Fiesta Bowl.
Nebraska Cornhuskers	Arizona State Sun Devils
(10–1)	(11–0)
Big 8	WAC
14	17
Head coach: Tom Osborne	Head coach: Frank Kush
AP / Coaches; 6 / 6	AP / Coaches; 7 / 7
	1	2	3	4	Total
Nebraska	0	7	7	0	14
Arizona State	3	3	0	11	17
- Date: December 26, 1975
- Season: 1975
- Stadium: Sun Devil Stadium
- Location: Tempe, Arizona
- MVP: John Jefferson (ASU WR); Larry Gordon (ASU LB)
- Favorite: Nebraska by 14 points
- Attendance: 51,396

United States TV coverage
- Network: CBS
- Announcers: Pat Summerall, Tom Brookshier

The 1975 Fiesta Bowl was the fifth edition of the college football bowl game, played at Sun Devil Stadium in Tempe, Arizona on Friday, December 26. Part of the 1975–76 bowl game season, it matched the sixth-ranked Nebraska Cornhuskers of the Big Eight Conference and the undefeated #7 Arizona State Sun Devils of the Western Athletic Conference (WAC). The underdog Sun Devils won, 17–14.

Played at ASU's home venue, this was the Fiesta Bowl's first matchup between teams ranked in the top ten; the next was six years later.

== Teams ==
=== Nebraska ===
The Cornhuskers won their first ten games of the season and climbed to second in the AP poll; they were set up for a Big Eight title and potential national championship until a fourth consecutive loss to rival Oklahoma on November 22. This was Nebraska's first appearance in the Fiesta Bowl; the Huskers had won their previous six bowl games, and the last five were major bowls.

=== Arizona State ===
The Sun Devils won all eleven games in the regular season to take their fifth WAC title in six years; it was their fourth Fiesta Bowl appearance in five years.

== Game summary ==
The game kicked off shortly after 1 p.m. MST, following the Sun Bowl, both televised by CBS.

Placekicker Danny Kush started and ended the scoring in this game that arguably put the Fiesta Bowl on the map. He gave ASU an early lead in the first quarter, but I-back Monte Anthony gave Nebraska the lead in the second quarter with his one-yard touchdown run. With less than a minute remaining in the half, the Sun Devils drove down the field and narrowed the lead to a point with another Kush field goal.

Anthony scored another touchdown in the third quarter to extend Nebraska's lead to 14–6. Wide receiver John Jefferson caught a ten-yard touchdown pass from backup quarterback Fred Mortensen, who had taken over after sophomore starter Dennis Sproul was briefly hurt on a successful sneak on fourth down at the Nebraska thirteen to extend the drive. Head coach Frank Kush opted for a two-point conversion attempt, and wingback Larry Mucker caught a pass from Mortensen at the end zone's left edge to tie the game at fourteen early in the final quarter.

Nebraska punted twice after short drives, with Mortensen throwing an interception in between. Sproul returned at quarterback and he drove the Sun Devils down the field to the Nebraska twelve; Kush kicked a 29-yard field goal for a three-point lead with under five minutes remaining. The Huskers then got their offense going, and with just over a minute remaining, fullback Tony Davis caught a third-down pass over the middle inside the Devils' thirty. He was hit by John Harris and fumbled, ASU's Rocky Mataalli recovered, and the offense ran out the clock.

Arizona State held Nebraska scoreless in the fourth quarter to win their fourth Fiesta Bowl in as many attempts; Jefferson was named offensive MVP with eight receptions for 115 yards. Linebacker Larry Gordon was the defensive MVP, but was ejected early in the fourth quarter for fighting (along with Nebraska's consensus All-American center Rik Bonness). Nebraska led in rushing yards, but ASU outgained them in passing and total yards, had fewer turnovers, and scored just one touchdown.

=== Scoring ===
First quarter

- ASU – Danny Kush 27-yard field goal

Second quarter

- NEB – Monte Anthony 1-yard run (Mike Coyle kick)
- ASU – Kush 33-yard field goal

Third quarter

- NEB – Anthony 4-yard run (Coyle kick)

Fourth quarter

- ASU – John Jefferson 10-yard pass from Fred Mortensen (Larry Mucker pass from Mortensen)
- ASU – Kush 29-yard field goal

== Statistics ==
Statistics	Arizona State	Nebraska
First downs	20	20
Rushes–yards	37–162	57–198
Passing yards	173	90
Passes	15–37–2	12–23–1
Return yards	0	20
Total offense	74–335	80–288
Punts–average	5–37.2	7–39.4
Fumbles–lost	0–0	2–2
Turnovers	2	3
Penalties–yards	6–54	4–38

== Aftermath ==
Arizona State (12–0) was second in the final AP poll, their best finish ever; Nebraska (10–2) dropped to ninth. ASU won another WAC title in 1977 and moved to the Pac-10 in 1978. Both teams returned multiple times to the Fiesta Bowl, Nebraska five times (next in January 1986) and ASU twice (next in December 1977).
