= Dick Gwinn =

American football player and coach

Biographical details
- Born: c. 1936 (age 89–90)

Playing career
- 1956–1958: Oklahoma
- Position: Guard

Coaching career (HC unless noted)
- 1968–1970: NE Oklahoma A&M (assistant)
- 1971–1972: Weber State (DC)
- 1973–1976: Weber State

Head coaching record
- Overall: 10–33–1

Richard L. Gwinn (born c. 1936) is an American former football player and coach. He serves as the football head coach at Weber State College—now known as Weber State University—in Ogden, Utah, from 1973 to 1976, compiling a 10–33–1 (.239) record.

== Playing career ==
Gwinn played guard at the University of Oklahoma under head coach Bud Wilkinson from 1956 to 1958. The Sooners were undefeated in 1956 and lost only once in both 1957 and 1958.

== Coaching career ==
Gwinn was an assistant coach at Northeastern Oklahoma A&M College in Miami, Oklahoma, from 1968 to 1970, when the team compiled a 23–5 (.821) record in three seasons and won the NJCAA National Football Championship in 1969. He was hired as the defensive coordinator at Weber State in the Big Sky Conference in 1971 and succeeded Sark Arslanian as head coach in January 1973. During his fourth year in 1976, Gwinn announced his resignation in mid-October, effective at the end of the season.

== Head coaching record ==
Year	Team	Overall	Conference	Standing	Bowl/playoffs
Weber State Wildcats (Big Sky Conference) (1973–1976)
1973	Weber State	3–8	2–4	T–5th	
1974	Weber State	4–7	1–5	7th	
1975	Weber State	1–9–1	1–4–1	6th	
1976	Weber State	2–9	1–5	6th	
Weber State:		10–33–1	5–18–1		
Total:		10–33–1			
