= 1975 Humboldt State Lumberjacks football team =

American college football season

1975 Humboldt State Lumberjacks football
- Conference: Far Western Conference
- Record: 7–3 (4–1 FWC)
- Head coach: Bud Van Deren (10th season)
- Home stadium: Redwood Bowl

1975 Far Western Conference football standings
	Conf.					Overall
Team	W		L		T	W		L		T
UC Davis $	5	–	0	–	0	7	–	3	–	0
Humboldt State	4	–	1	–	0	7	–	3	–	0
Sacramento State	2	–	3	–	0	5	–	5	–	0
San Francisco State	2	–	3	–	0	4	–	4	–	1
Chico State	2	–	3	–	0	4	–	6	–	0
Cal State Hayward	0	–	5	–	0	0	–	10	–	0
$ – Conference champion

The 1975 Humboldt State Lumberjacks football team represented Humboldt State University—now known as California State Polytechnic University, Humboldt—as a member of the Far Western Conference (FWC) during the 1975 NCAA Division II football season. Led by tenth-year head coach Bud Van Deren, the Lumberjacks compiled an overall record of 7–3 with a mark of 4–1 in conference play, placing second in the FWC. The team outscored its opponents 240 to 156 for the season. Humboldt State played home games at the Redwood Bowl in Arcata, California.

== Schedule ==
Date	Opponent	Site	Result	Attendance	Source
September 13	Humboldt State alumni*	Redwood Bowl; Arcata, CA	W 41–14	2,500	
September 20	Puget Sound*	Redwood Bowl; Arcata, CA	L 9–20	2,400	
September 27	Linfield*	Redwood Bowl; Arcata, CA	W 24–3	3,100	
October 4	at Cal State Hayward	Pioneer Stadium; Hayward, CA	W 25–24	1,000	
October 11	Sacramento State	Redwood Bowl; Arcata, CA	W 28–7	4,500–4,700	
October 18	at Simon Fraser*	Thunderbird Stadium; University Endowment Lands, BC	W 20–0	5,000	
October 25	No. 10 UC Davis	Redwood Bowl; Arcata, CA	L 10–20	5,000	
November 1	at San Francisco State	Cox Stadium; San Francisco, CA	W 27–16	1,000	
November 8	at Santa Clara*	Buck Shaw Stadium; Santa Clara, CA	L 23–29	6,610	
November 15	at Chico State	University Stadium; Chico, CA	W 33–23	1,000	
*Non-conference game; Rankings from UPI Poll released prior to the game

== Team players in the NFL ==
No Humboldt State players were selected in the 1976 NFL draft. The following finished their college career in 1975, were not drafted, but played in the NFL.

Player	Position	First NFL team
Steve Kincannon	Quarterback	1976 Houston Oilers
