= 1975 Weber State Wildcats football team =

American college football season

1975 Weber State Wildcats football
- Conference: Big Sky Conference
- Record: 1–9–1 (1–4–1 Big Sky)
- Head coach: Dick Gwinn (3rd season)
- Home stadium: Wildcat Stadium

1975 Big Sky Conference football standings
	Conf.					Overall
Team	W		L		T	W		L		T
No. 6 Boise State $^	5	–	0	–	1	9	–	2	–	1
Idaho State	4	–	2	–	0	7	–	3	–	0
Montana State	4	–	2	–	0	5	–	5	–	0
Idaho	2	–	2	–	2	4	–	5	–	2
Montana	3	–	3	–	0	6	–	4	–	0
Weber State	1	–	4	–	1	1	–	9	–	1
Northern Arizona	0	–	6	–	0	1	–	9	–	0
$ – Conference champion; ^ – NCAA Division II playoff participant; Rankings from NCAA Division II AP Poll

The 1975 Weber State Wildcats football team represented Weber State College (now known as Weber State University) as a member of the Big Sky Conference during the 1975 NCAA Division II football season. Led by third-year head coach Dick Gwinn, the Wildcats compiled an overall record of 1–9–1, with a mark of 1–4–1 in conference play, and finished sixth in the Big Sky.

== Schedule ==
Date	Opponent	Site	Result	Attendance	Source
September 13	Southern Miss*	Wildcat Stadium; Ogden, UT	L 10–14	9,396	
September 20	Western Illinois*	Wildcat Stadium; Ogden, UT	L 10–19	10,945	
September 27	No. 3 Boise State	Wildcat Stadium; Ogden, UT	L 7–34	11,342	
October 4	Montana	Wildcat Stadium; Ogden, UT	L 12–48	7,409	
October 11	at Montana State	Sales Stadium; Bozeman, MT	L 14–31	5,755	
October 18	Utah State*	Wildcat Stadium; Ogden, UT	L 7–30	11,503	
October 25	at No. 11 Idaho State	ASISU Minidome; Pocatello, ID	L 3–20	9,622	
November 1	at Cal State Northridge*	North Campus Stadium; Northridge, CA	L 10–17	3,000	
November 8	Idaho	Wildcat Stadium; Ogden, UT	T 40–40	3,866	
November 15	at UNLV*	Las Vegas Stadium; Whitney, NV	L 14–38	9,530	
November 22	Northern Arizona	Wildcat Stadium; Ogden, UT	W 19–8	3,346	
*Non-conference game; Rankings from AP Poll released prior to the game

== Roster ==
1975 Weber State Wildcats football team roster
Players
Coaches
Offense

Pos.	#	Name	Class
RB	3	Don Reddic	Sr
WR	9	Tracy Deneke	Jr
QB	10	Kermit Musseau	Sr
QB	11	Bobby Martin	Jr
QB	14	Les Ball	Fr
QB	16	Marc Farris	Fr
WR	18	Jay Spendlove	Jr
WR	19	Rob Bockwoldt	Jr
RB	20	Jon Rogers	So
RB	25	Doug McOmie	Jr
FB	27	Frazier Scott	Fr

Defense

Pos.	#	Name	Class
LB	17	Dean Askew	Sr
DB	21	Rob Wilcoxen	Jr
LB	22	Craig Page	Fr
DB	23	Cliff Peterson	Fr
DB	26	Orin Trussell	Jr
DB	28	Reggie Roberts	Fr
S	32	Wilfred Calvin	Sr

Special teams

Pos.	#	Name	Class
K	13	Dannie Marrelli	Sr

Head coach

- Dick Gwinn

Coordinators/assistant coaches

Legend

- (C) Team captain
- (S) Suspended
- (I) Ineligible
- Injured
- Redshirt
