= 1975 Cal State Hayward Pioneers football team =

American college football season

1975 Cal State Hayward Pioneers football
- Conference: Far Western Conference
- Record: 0–10 (0–5 FWC)
- Head coach: Tim Tierney (1st season)
- Home stadium: Pioneer Stadium

1975 Far Western Conference football standings
	Conf.					Overall
Team	W		L		T	W		L		T
UC Davis $	5	–	0	–	0	7	–	3	–	0
Humboldt State	4	–	1	–	0	7	–	3	–	0
Sacramento State	2	–	3	–	0	5	–	5	–	0
San Francisco State	2	–	3	–	0	4	–	4	–	1
Chico State	2	–	3	–	0	4	–	6	–	0
Cal State Hayward	0	–	5	–	0	0	–	10	–	0
$ – Conference champion

The 1975 Cal State Hayward Pioneers football team represented California State University, Hayward—now known as California State University, East Bay—as a member of the Far Western Conference (FWC) during the 1975 NCAA Division II football season. Led by first-year head coach Tim Tierney, Cal State Hayward compiled an overall record of 0–10 with a mark of 0–5 in conference play, placing last out of six teams in the FWC. The team was outscored by its opponents 240 to 99 for the season. The Pioneers played home games at Pioneer Stadium in Hayward, California.

== Schedule ==
Date	Opponent	Site	Result	Attendance	Source
September 13	at Boise State*	Bronco Stadium; Boise, ID	L 20–42	18,046	
September 20	at Cal Poly Pomona*	Kellogg Field; Pomona, CA	L 17–41	3,300	
September 27	at Santa Clara*	Buck Shaw Stadium; Santa Clara, CA	L 12–35	5,200	
October 4	Humboldt State	Pioneer Stadium; Hayward, CA	L 24–25	1,000	
October 11	UC Davis	Pioneer Stadium; Hayward, CA	L 3–6	1,300	
October 17	at San Francisco State	Cox Stadium; San Francisco, CA	L 6–33	800	
October 25	Nevada*	Pioneer Stadium; Hayward, CA	L 10–17	500	
November 1	Chico State	Pioneer Stadium; Hayward, CA	L 7–9	650	
November 8	at UC Riverside*	Highlander Stadium; Riverside, CA	L 0–17	3,000	
November 15	at Sacramento State	Hornet Stadium; Sacramento, CA	L 0–15	3,000	
*Non-conference game

== Team players in the NFL ==
No Cal State Hayward Pioneers players were selected in the 1976 NFL draft.

The following finished their college career in 1975, were not drafted, but played in the NFL.

Player	Position	First NFL team
Greg Blankenship	Linebacker	1976 Oakland Raiders
