= 1975 Wyoming Cowboys football team =

American college football season

1975 Wyoming Cowboys football
- Conference: Western Athletic Conference
- Record: 2–9 (1–6 WAC)
- Head coach: Fred Akers (1st season)
- Defensive coordinator: Leon Fuller (1st season)
- Captains: Andy Dixon; Aaron Kyle
- Home stadium: War Memorial Stadium

1975 Western Athletic Conference football standings
	Conf.					Overall
Team	W		L		T	W		L		T
No. 2 Arizona State $	7	–	0	–	0	12	–	0	–	0
No. 18 Arizona	5	–	2	–	0	9	–	2	–	0
Colorado State	4	–	2	–	0	6	–	5	–	0
BYU	4	–	3	–	0	6	–	5	–	0
New Mexico	4	–	3	–	0	6	–	5	–	0
Utah	1	–	4	–	0	1	–	10	–	0
Wyoming	1	–	6	–	0	2	–	9	–	0
UTEP	0	–	6	–	0	1	–	10	–	0
$ – Conference champion; Rankings from AP Poll

The 1975 Wyoming Cowboys football team was an American football team that represented the University of Wyoming as a member of the Western Athletic Conference (WAC) during the 1975 NCAA Division I football season. In their first year under head coach Fred Akers, the Cowboys compiled a 2–9 record (1–6 against conference opponents), finished eighth in the WAC, and were outscored by a total of 219 to 174. The team played its home games on campus at War Memorial Stadium in Laramie, Wyoming.

Akers was previously the offensive coordinator at the University of Texas under head coach Darrell Royal.

== Schedule ==
Date	Opponent	Site	Result	Attendance	Source
September 13	Idaho State*	War Memorial Stadium; Laramie, WY	L 3–16	20,560	
September 20	at Colorado*	Folsom Field; Boulder, CO	L 10–27	46,032	
September 27	No. 15 Arizona^{†}	War Memorial Stadium; Laramie, WY	L 0–14	21,909	
October 4	Colorado State	War Memorial Stadium; Laramie, WY (rivalry)	L 0–3	20,576	
October 11	at Utah	Robert Rice Stadium; Salt Lake City, UT	L 13–16	18,203	
October 18	UTEP	War Memorial Stadium; Laramie, WY	W 31–14	16,297	
October 25	BYU	War Memorial Stadium; Laramie, WY	L 20–33	16,297	
November 1	at Utah State*	Romney Stadium; Logan, UT	L 21–27	14,905	
November 8	at No. 10 Arizona State	Sun Devil Stadium; Tempe, AZ	L 20–21	43,038	
November 15	at New Mexico	University Stadium; Albuquerque, NM	L 32–38	13,791	
November 22	at Air Force*	Falcon Stadium; Colorado Springs, CO	W 24–10	31,913	
*Non-conference game; ^{†}Homecoming; Rankings from AP Poll released prior to the game

== Roster ==
1975 Wyoming Cowboys football team roster
Players
Coaches
Offense

Pos.	#	Name	Class
WR	8	John Arnold	So
OT	71	Dan Borkowski	Sr
G	68	Curt Boyd	Sr
TE	89	Frank Chesley	So
C	59	Ray Davies	Jr
OT	60	Steve Edwards	Jr
FB	35	Lawrence Gaines	Sr
QB	6	Jim Hector	Jr
TE	81	Mark Seymour	Sr
G	65	Steve Steingraeber	Jr
QB	15	Steve Trusso	Sr

Defense

Pos.	#	Name	Class
DE	56	Chuck Craig	Sr
LB	16	Craig Dudley	So
LB	99	Mark Durkee	Fr
LB	86	Ken Fantetti	Fr
DB	5	Chris Mullen	Fr
CB	39	Mike Rafferty	So
SS	25	Aaron Kyle	Sr
DT	77	Mark Webb	Fr

Special teams

Pos.	#	Name	Class

Head coach

- Fred Akers (1st year)

Coordinators/assistant coaches

Legend

- (C) Team captain
- (S) Suspended
- (I) Ineligible
- Injured
- Redshirt
