= 1975 Chico State Wildcats football team =

American college football season

1975 Chico State Wildcats football
- Conference: Far Western Conference
- Record: 4–6 (2–3 FWC)
- Head coach: Dick Trimmer (2nd season)
- Home stadium: University Stadium

1975 Far Western Conference football standings
	Conf.					Overall
Team	W		L		T	W		L		T
UC Davis $	5	–	0	–	0	7	–	3	–	0
Humboldt State	4	–	1	–	0	7	–	3	–	0
Sacramento State	2	–	3	–	0	5	–	5	–	0
San Francisco State	2	–	3	–	0	4	–	4	–	1
Chico State	2	–	3	–	0	4	–	6	–	0
Cal State Hayward	0	–	5	–	0	0	–	10	–	0
$ – Conference champion

The 1975 Chico State Wildcats football team represented California State University, Chico as a member of the Far Western Conference (FWC) during the 1975 NCAA Division II football season. Led by second-year head coach Dick Trimmer, Chico State compiled an overall record of 4–6 with a mark of 2–3 in conference play, placing in a three-way tied for third in the FWC. The team was outscored by its opponents 295 to 118 for the season. The Wildcats played home games at University Stadium in Chico, California.

== Schedule ==
Date	Opponent	Site	Result	Attendance	Source
September 13	Cal Poly Pomona*	University Stadium; Chico, CA	L 3–38	5,500	
September 20	Simon Fraser*	University Stadium; Chico, CA	L 13–14	3,500	
September 27	at Willamette*	McCulloch Stadium; Salem, OR	W 19–8	2,250	
October 4	at UC Davis	Toomey Field; Davis, CA	L 0–31	8,400–8,600	
October 11	San Francisco State	University Stadium; Chico, CA	W 24–14	2,000–2,500	
October 18	Nevada*	University Stadium; Chico, CA	W 6–3	1,200–1,500	
October 25	at Puget Sound*	Baker Stadium; Tacoma, WA	L 12–35	1,650	
November 1	at Cal State Hayward	Pioneer Stadium; Hayward, CA	W 9–7	650	
November 8	Sacramento State	University Stadium; Chico, CA	L 9–12	3,000	
November 15	Humboldt State	University Stadium; Chico, CA	L 23–33	1,000	
*Non-conference game

== Team players in the NFL ==
The following Chico State players were selected in the 1976 NFL draft.

Player	Position	Round	Overall	NFL team
Rich Sorenson	Kicker	8	217	Detroit Lions

The following finished their Chico State career in 1975, were not drafted, but played in the NFL.

Player	Position	First NFL team
Chris Pane	Defensive back	1976 Denver Broncos
