= 1975 Cal State Northridge Matadors football team =

American college football season

1975 Cal State Northridge Matadors football
- Conference: California Collegiate Athletic Association
- Record: 4–6–1 (1–3 CCAA)
- Head coach: Gary Torgeson (3rd season)
- Home stadium: North Campus Stadium

1975 California Collegiate Athletic Association football standings
	Conf.					Overall
Team	W		L		T	W		L		T
UC Riverside $	4	–	0	–	0	7	–	3	–	0
Cal Poly	3	–	1	–	0	6	–	4	–	0
Cal Poly Pomona	2	–	2	–	0	6	–	4	–	1
Cal State Northridge	1	–	3	–	0	4	–	6	–	1
Cal State Los Angeles	0	–	4	–	0	1	–	7	–	1
$ – Conference champion

The 1975 Cal State Northridge Matadors football team represented California State University, Northridge as a member of the California Collegiate Athletic Association (CCAA) during the 1975 NCAA Division II football season. Led by Gary Torgeson in his third and final season as head coach, Cal State Northridge compiled an overall record of 4–6–1 with a mark of 1–3 in conference play, placing fourth in the CCAA. The team outscored its opponents 166 to 164 for the season. The Matadors played home games at North Campus Stadium in Northridge, California.

== Schedule ==
Date	Opponent	Site	Result	Attendance	Source
September 13	San Francisco State*	North Campus Stadium; Northridge, CA	T 6–6	2,800–3,412	
September 20	at Fresno State*	Ratcliffe Stadium; Fresno, CA	W 13–7	8,528–9,000	
September 27	at UC Davis*	Toomey Field; Davis, CA	L 3–20	4,300–6,900	
October 4	San Diego*	North Campus Stadium; Northridge, CA	W 48–0	3,000	
October 11	at Cal Lutheran*	Mt. Clef Field; Thousand Oaks, CA	L 8–16	3,500–4,000	
October 25	Cal Poly	North Campus Stadium; Northridge, CA	L 14–27	2,800–2,873	
November 1	Weber State*	North Campus Stadium; Northridge, CA	W 17–10	3,000	
November 15	UC Riverside	North Campus Stadium; Northridge, CA	L 14–30	2,450–2,934	
November 22	at Cal State Los Angeles	Campus Field; Los Angeles, CA	W 21–6	400–1,500	
November 29	Cal State Fullerton*	Santa Ana Stadium; Santa Ana, CA	L 0–14	2,400	
December 6	Cal Poly Pomona	North Campus Stadium; Northridge, CA	L 22–28	1,800–2,500	
*Non-conference game

== Team players in the NFL ==
The following Cal State Northridge players were selected in the 1976 NFL draft.

Player	Position	Round	Overall	NFL team
Melvin Wilson	Defensive Back	5	136	New York Giants
