= 1975 San Diego State Aztecs football team =

American college football season

1975 San Diego State Aztecs football
- Conference: Pacific Coast Athletic Association
- Record: 8–3 (3–2 PCAA)
- Head coach: Claude Gilbert (3rd season)
- Offensive coordinator: Ted Tollner (3rd season)
- Offensive scheme: Pro-style
- Base defense: 4–3
- Home stadium: San Diego Stadium

1975 Pacific Coast Athletic Association football standings
	Conf.					Overall
Team	W		L		T	W		L		T
San Jose State $	5	–	0	–	0	9	–	2	–	0
Long Beach State	4	–	1	–	0	9	–	2	–	0
San Diego State	3	–	2	–	0	8	–	3	–	0
Pacific (CA)	2	–	3	–	0	5	–	6	–	1
Fresno State	1	–	4	–	0	3	–	8	–	0
Cal State Fullerton	0	–	5	–	0	2	–	9	–	0
$ – Conference champion

The 1975 San Diego State Aztecs football team represented San Diego State University during the 1975 NCAA Division I football season as a member of the Pacific Coast Athletic Association. (Note: The Big West Conference was known as the Pacific Coast Athletic Association from its founding in 1969 through 1987.) This was the final season for San Diego State as a member of the PCAA. They won or shared the conference championship in five of their seven years of membership.

The team was led by head coach Claude Gilbert, in his third year, and played home games at San Diego Stadium (Note: San Diego County Credit Union Stadium (SDCCU Stadium) was known as San Diego Stadium from its opening in 1967 through 1980.) in San Diego, California. They finished the season with a record of eight wins, three losses (8–3, 3–2 PCAA).

== Schedule ==
Date	Opponent	Rank	Site	Result	Attendance	Source
September 5	UTEP*		San Diego Stadium; San Diego, CA	W 31–10	33,964	
September 13	at Oregon State*		Civic Stadium; Portland, OR	W 25–0	18,780	
September 20	North Texas State*		San Diego Stadium; San Diego, CA	W 30–12	35,829	
September 27	at Utah State*		Romney Stadium; Logan, UT	W 19–10	15,768	
October 4	Cal State Fullerton		San Diego Stadium; San Diego, CA	W 59–14	39,780	
October 11	at Fresno State		Ratcliffe Stadium; Fresno, CA (rivalry)	W 29–0	9,326	
October 18	New Mexico State*		San Diego Stadium; San Diego, CA	W 48–3	45,022	
November 1	at Pacific (CA)	No. 18	Pacific Memorial Stadium; Stockton, CA	W 31–13	12,496	
November 8	No. 15 Arizona*	No. 13	San Diego Stadium; San Diego, CA	L 24–31	53,611	
November 15	at San Jose State		Spartan Stadium; San Jose, CA	L 7–31	20,399	
November 22	Long Beach State		San Diego Stadium; San Diego, CA	L 17–21	36,825	
*Non-conference game; Rankings from AP Poll released prior to the game

== Team players in the NFL ==
The following were selected in the 1976 NFL draft.

Player	Position	Round	Overall	NFL team
Duke Fergerson	Wide receiver	3	73	Dallas Cowboys
Craig Penrose	Quarterback	4	107	Denver Broncos
Greg Boyd	Defensive end	6	170	New England Patriots
Mike Gilbert	Defensive tackle	11	300	Philadelphia Eagles
Mel Jacobs	Wide receiver	13	363	Detroit Lions
Reggie Lewis	Defensive end	16	443	San Francisco 49ers

== Team awards ==
Award	Player
Most Valuable Player (John Simcox Memorial Trophy)	Craig Penrose
Outstanding Offensive & Defensive Linemen (Byron H. Chase Memorial Trophy)	Charlie Wortiska, Off; Reggie Lewis, Def
Team captains Dr. R. Hardy / C.E. Peterson Memorial Trophy	Monte Reed, Off; Ed Kertel, Def
Most Inspirational Player	Tim Delaney, Bob Johnson
