= 1975 Cal Poly Pomona Broncos football team =

American college football season

1975 Cal Poly Pomona Broncos football
- Conference: California Collegiate Athletic Association
- Record: 6–4–1 (2–2 CCAA)
- Head coach: Andy Vinci (2nd season)
- Home stadium: Kellogg Field

1975 California Collegiate Athletic Association football standings
	Conf.					Overall
Team	W		L		T	W		L		T
UC Riverside $	4	–	0	–	0	7	–	3	–	0
Cal Poly	3	–	1	–	0	6	–	4	–	0
Cal Poly Pomona	2	–	2	–	0	6	–	4	–	1
Cal State Northridge	1	–	3	–	0	4	–	6	–	1
Cal State Los Angeles	0	–	4	–	0	1	–	7	–	1
$ – Conference champion

The 1975 Cal Poly Pomona Broncos football team represented California State Polytechnic University, Pomona as a California Collegiate Athletic Association (CCAA) member during the 1975 NCAA Division II football season. Led by second-year head coach Andy Vinci, Cal Poly Pomona compiled an overall record of 6–4–1 with a mark of 2–2 in conference play, placing third in the CCAA. The team outscored its opponents 256 to 199 for the season. The Broncos played home games at Kellogg Field in Pomona, California.

== Schedule ==
Date	Opponent	Site	Result	Attendance	Source
September 13	at Chico State*	University Stadium; Chico, CA	W 38–3	5,500	
September 20	Cal State Hayward*	Kellogg Field; Pomona, CA	W 41–17	3,300	
September 27	Northern Arizona*	Kellogg Field; Pomona, CA	W 3–0	4,000	
October 4	at Sacramento State*	Hornet Stadium; Sacramento, CA	L 13–17	4,200–4,800	
October 11	Puget Sound*	Kellogg Field; Pomona, CA	T 3–3	2,500	
October 25	at UC Riverside	Highlander Stadium; Riverside, CA	L 20–24	3,200	
November 1	at Cal State Los Angeles	Campus Field; Los Angeles, CA	W 54–21	3,000	
November 8	at North Texas State*	Fouts Field; Denton, TX	L 17–27	18,472	
November 15	at Cal State Fullerton*	Santa Ana Stadium; Santa Ana, CA	W 33–21	3,000–3,500	
November 22	at Cal Poly	Mustang Stadium; San Luis Obispo, CA	L 6–44	6,154	
December 6	at Cal State Northridge	Devonshire Downs; Northridge, CA	W 28–22	1,800–2,500	
*Non-conference game

== Team players in the NFL ==
No Cal Poly Pomona players were selected in the 1976 NFL draft.

The following player finished their Cal Poly Pomona career in 1975, were not drafted, but played in the NFL.

Player	Position	First NFL team
Jim Zorn	Quarterback	1976 Seattle Seahawks
