= 1975 Cal State Fullerton Titans football team =

American college football season

1975 Cal State Fullerton Titans football
- Conference: Pacific Coast Athletic Association
- Record: 2–9 (0–5 PCAA)
- Head coach: Jim Colletto (1st season)
- Home stadium: Santa Ana Stadium

1975 Pacific Coast Athletic Association football standings
	Conf.					Overall
Team	W		L		T	W		L		T
San Jose State $	5	–	0	–	0	9	–	2	–	0
Long Beach State	4	–	1	–	0	9	–	2	–	0
San Diego State	3	–	2	–	0	8	–	3	–	0
Pacific (CA)	2	–	3	–	0	5	–	6	–	1
Fresno State	1	–	4	–	0	3	–	8	–	0
Cal State Fullerton	0	–	5	–	0	2	–	9	–	0
$ – Conference champion

The 1975 Cal State Fullerton Titans football team represented California State University, Fullerton as a member of the Pacific Coast Athletic Association (PCAA) during the 1975 NCAA Division I football season. Led by first-year head coach Jim Colletto, Cal State Fullerton compiled an overall record 2–9 with a mark of 0–5 in conference play, placing last out of six teams in the PCAA. The Titans played home games at Santa Ana Stadium in Santa Ana, California.

== Schedule ==
Date	Opponent	Site	Result	Attendance	Source
September 6	at Fresno State*	Ratcliffe Stadium; Fresno, CA	L 7–49	10,143	
September 20	Long Beach State*	Santa Ana Stadium; Santa Ana, CA	L 6–32	3,100	
September 27	at Cal Poly	Mustang Stadium; San Luis Obispo, CA	L 10–23	5,600–6,500	
October 4	at No. 18 San Diego State	San Diego Stadium; San Diego, CA	L 14–59	39,780	
October 11	at Pacific (CA)*	Pacific Memorial Stadium; Stockton, CA	L 20–31	8,017	
October 18	UC Riverside	Santa Ana Stadium; Santa Ana, CA	W 32–31	1,000–1,200	
October 25	at San Jose State	Spartan Stadium; San Jose, CA	L 7–41	10,048	
November 1	at Hawaii*	Aloha Stadium; Halawa, HI	L 7–16	19,178	
November 15	Cal Poly Pomona*	Santa Ana Stadium; Santa Ana, CA	L 21–33	3,000	
November 22	at Southern Miss*	Municipal Stadium; Biloxi, MS	L 0–70	9,323	
November 29	Cal State Northridge	Santa Ana Stadium; Santa Ana, CA	W 14–0	2,400	
*Non-conference game; Rankings from Coaches' Poll released prior to the game
