= 1975 Idaho State Bengals football team =

American college football season

1975 Idaho State Bengals football
- Conference: Big Sky Conference
- Record: 7–3 (4–2 Big Sky)
- Head coach: Bob Griffin (4th season)
- Defensive coordinator: Joe Pascale (2nd season)
- Home stadium: ASISU Minidome

1975 Big Sky Conference football standings
	Conf.					Overall
Team	W		L		T	W		L		T
No. 6 Boise State $^	5	–	0	–	1	9	–	2	–	1
Idaho State	4	–	2	–	0	7	–	3	–	0
Montana State	4	–	2	–	0	5	–	5	–	0
Idaho	2	–	2	–	2	4	–	5	–	2
Montana	3	–	3	–	0	6	–	4	–	0
Weber State	1	–	4	–	1	1	–	9	–	1
Northern Arizona	0	–	6	–	0	1	–	9	–	0
$ – Conference champion; ^ – NCAA Division II playoff participant; Rankings from NCAA Division II AP Poll

The 1975 Idaho State Bengals football team represented Idaho State University as a member of the Big Sky Conference during the 1975 NCAA Division II football season. Led by Bob Griffin in the fourth and final season as head coach, the Bengals compiled an overall record of 7–3 with a mark of 4–2 in conference play, tying for second place in the Big Sky. Home games were played on campus at the ASISU Minidome (now Holt Arena), an indoor facility in Pocatello, Idaho.

In February 1976, Griffin returned to his native New England at the University of Rhode Island, and was the Rams' head coach for the next 17 seasons. Bengals' defensive coordinator Joe Pascale was promoted to head coach.

== Schedule ==
Date	Opponent	Rank	Site	Result	Attendance	Source
September 13	at Wyoming*		War Memorial Stadium; Laramie, WY	W 16–3	20,560	
September 20	UNLV*		ASISU Minidome; Pocatello, ID	W 15–7	10,500–10,510	
September 27	at Idaho	No. 6	Kibbie Dome; Moscow, ID (rivalry)	W 29–15	14,079	
October 4	Northern Arizona	No. 6	ASISU Minidome; Pocatello, ID	W 17–7	10,156	
October 11	at No. 10 Montana	No. 5	Dornblaser Field; Missoula, MT	W 10–7	9,200	
October 18	Montana State	No. 4	ASISU Minidome; Pocatello, ID	L 7–19	11,500	
October 25	Weber State	No. 11	ASISU Minidome; Pocatello, ID	W 20–3	9,622	
November 1	at Nevada*	No. 10	Mackay Stadium; Reno, NV	W 28–3	2,200–2,900	
November 8	at Cal Poly*	No. 9	Mustang Stadium; San Luis Obispo, CA	L 14–65	7,960	
November 22	No. 7 Boise State		ASISU Minidome; Pocatello, ID	L 17–20	12,000	
*Non-conference game; Rankings from AP Poll released prior to the game
