= 1975 UC Riverside Highlanders football team =

American college football season

1975 UC Riverside Highlanders football

CCAA champion
- Conference: California Collegiate Athletic Association
- Record: 7–3 (4–0 CCAA)
- Head coach: Bob Toledo (2nd season)
- Home stadium: Highlander Stadium

1975 California Collegiate Athletic Association football standings
	Conf.					Overall
Team	W		L		T	W		L		T
UC Riverside $	4	–	0	–	0	7	–	3	–	0
Cal Poly	3	–	1	–	0	6	–	4	–	0
Cal Poly Pomona	2	–	2	–	0	6	–	4	–	1
Cal State Northridge	1	–	3	–	0	4	–	6	–	1
Cal State Los Angeles	0	–	4	–	0	1	–	7	–	1
$ – Conference champion

The 1975 UCR Highlanders football team represented the University of California, Riverside as a member of the California Collegiate Athletic Association (CCAA) during the 1975 NCAA Division II football season. Led by second-year head coach Bob Toledo, UC Riverside compiled an overall record of 7–3 with a mark of 4–0 in conference play, winning the CCAA title. The team outscored its opponents 278 to 192 for the season. The Highlanders played home games Highlander Stadium in Riverside, California.

Despite winning the conference championship for the second consecutive year and for the third time in four seasons, UC Riverside announced, on December 4, 1975, that they were discontinuing their football program. They primary reason given was lack of fan support attendance. The Highlanders played for 21 seasons (1955–1975).

== Schedule ==
Date	Opponent	Site	Result	Attendance	Source
September 13	at Northern Arizona*	Lumberjack Stadium; Flagstaff, AZ	L 30–34	8,000	
September 20	UC Davis*	Highlander Stadium; Riverside, CA	L 22–31	1,700–4,000	
September 27	at Whittier*	Memorial Stadium; Whittier, CA	W 41–0	1,000–2,000	
October 4	at Santa Clara*	Buck Shaw Stadium; Santa Clara, CA	W 25–24	6,710	
October 11	at Cal State Los Angeles	Campus Field; Los Angeles, CA	W 48–30	1,500–3,000	
October 18	at Cal State Fullerton*	Santa Ana Stadium; Santa Ana, CA	L 31–32	1,000–1,200	
October 25	Cal Poly Pomona	Highlander Stadium; Riverside, CA	W 24–20	3,200	
November 1	Cal Poly	Highlander Stadium; Riverside, CA	W 10–7	4,779–4,975	
November 8	Cal State Hayward*	Highlander Stadium; Riverside, CA	W 17–0	3,000	
November 15	at Cal State Northridge	Devonshire Downs; Northridge, CA	W 30–14	2,450–2,934	
*Non-conference game

== Team players in the NFL ==
The following 1975 UC Riverside players were selected in the 1976 NFL draft or later. Dan Bunz and Calvin Sweeney transferred to other colleges as a result of the disbanding of the UC Riverside football program then were drafted out of that new school.

Player	Position	Round	Overall	NFL team
Russ Bolinger	Guard, tackle	3	68	1976 Detroit Lions
Butch Johnson	Wide receiver	3	87	1976 Dallas Cowboys
Dan Bunz	Linebacker	1	24	1978 San Francisco 49ers
Calvin Sweeney	Wide receiver	4	110	1980 Pittsburgh Steelers
