= 1975 Pacific Tigers football team =

American college football season

1975 Pacific Tigers football
- Conference: Pacific Coast Athletic Association
- Record: 5–6–1 (2–3 PCAA)
- Head coach: Chester Caddas (4th season)
- Home stadium: Pacific Memorial Stadium

1975 Pacific Coast Athletic Association football standings
	Conf.					Overall
Team	W		L		T	W		L		T
San Jose State $	5	–	0	–	0	9	–	2	–	0
Long Beach State	4	–	1	–	0	9	–	2	–	0
San Diego State	3	–	2	–	0	8	–	3	–	0
Pacific (CA)	2	–	3	–	0	5	–	6	–	1
Fresno State	1	–	4	–	0	3	–	8	–	0
Cal State Fullerton	0	–	5	–	0	2	–	9	–	0
$ – Conference champion

The 1975 Pacific Tigers football team represented the University of the Pacific (UOP) in the 1975 NCAA Division I football season as a member of the Pacific Coast Athletic Association. (Note: The Big West Conference was known as the Pacific Coast Athletic Association from its founding in 1969 through 1987.)

The team was led by head coach Chester Caddas, in his fourth year, and played their home games at Pacific Memorial Stadium (Note: Amos Alonzo Stagg Memorial Stadium was known as Pacific Memorial Stadium from its opening in 1950 through 1987.) in Stockton, California. They finished the season with a record of five wins, six losses and one tie (5–6–1, 2–3 PCAA).

== Schedule ==
Date	Opponent	Site	Result	Attendance	Source
September 6	at Northeast Louisiana*	Brown Stadium; Monroe, LA	T 3–3	8,200	
September 13	UC Davis*	Pacific Memorial Stadium; Stockton, CA	W 31–13	12,402	
September 20	at No. 17 Arizona*	Arizona Stadium; Tucson, AZ	L 0–16	37,720	
September 26	at Long Beach State	Veterans Stadium; Long Beach, CA	L 12–28	6,347	
October 4	UTEP*	Pacific Memorial Stadium; Stockton, CA	W 40–10	15,540	
October 11	Cal State Fullerton	Pacific Memorial Stadium; Stockton, CA	W 31–20	8,017	
October 18	at San Jose State	Spartan Stadium; San Jose, CA (Victory Bell)	L 13–41	18,202	
October 25	Fresno State^{†}	Pacific Memorial Stadium; Stockton, CA	W 45–28	10,565	
November 1	No. 18 San Diego State	Pacific Memorial Stadium; Stockton, CA	L 13–31	12,496	
November 8	at Southwestern Louisiana*	Cajun Field; Lafayette, LA	W 19–14		
November 15	at No. 8 Arizona State*	Sun Devil Stadium; Tempe, AZ	L 14–55	43,511	
November 22	at Hawaii*	Aloha Stadium; Halawa, HI	L 10–17	21,208	
*Non-conference game; ^{†}Homecoming; Rankings from AP Poll released prior to the game
