= 1975 UTEP Miners football team =

American college football season

1975 UTEP Miners football
- Conference: Western Athletic Conference
- Record: 1–10 (0–6 WAC)
- Head coach: Gil Bartosh (2nd season)
- Home stadium: Sun Bowl

1975 Western Athletic Conference football standings
| | Conf. | | | | | Overall |
| Team | W | | L | | T | W | | L | | T |
|---|---|---|---|---|---|---|---|---|---|---|
| No. 2 Arizona State $ | 7 | – | 0 | – | 0 | 12 | – | 0 | – | 0 |
| No. 18 Arizona | 5 | – | 2 | – | 0 | 9 | – | 2 | – | 0 |
| Colorado State | 4 | – | 2 | – | 0 | 6 | – | 5 | – | 0 |
| BYU | 4 | – | 3 | – | 0 | 6 | – | 5 | – | 0 |
| New Mexico | 4 | – | 3 | – | 0 | 6 | – | 5 | – | 0 |
| Utah | 1 | – | 4 | – | 0 | 1 | – | 10 | – | 0 |
| Wyoming | 1 | – | 6 | – | 0 | 2 | – | 9 | – | 0 |
| UTEP | 0 | – | 6 | – | 0 | 1 | – | 10 | – | 0 |
$ – Conference champion; Rankings from AP Poll

The 1975 UTEP Miners football team was an American football team that represented the University of Texas at El Paso in the Western Athletic Conference during the 1975 NCAA Division I football season. In their second year under head coach Gil Bartosh, the team compiled a 1–10 record.

== Schedule ==
| Date | Opponent | Site | Result | Attendance | Source |
|---|---|---|---|---|---|
| September 6 | at San Diego State* | San Diego Stadium; San Diego, CA | L 10–31 | 33,964 | |
| September 13 | New Mexico State* | Sun Bowl; El Paso, TX (rivalry) | L 24–31 | 16,550 | |
| September 20 | East Tennessee State* | Sun Bowl; El Paso, TX | W 6–3 | 13,500 | |
| October 4 | at Pacific (CA)* | Pacific Memorial Stadium; Stockton, CA | L 10–40 | 15,540 | |
| October 11 | No. 17 Arizona^{†} | Sun Bowl; El Paso, TX | L 0–36 | 15,700 | |
| October 18 | at Wyoming | War Memorial Stadium; Laramie, WY | L 14–31 | 16,297 | |
| October 25 | at No. 11 Arizona State | Sun Devil Stadium; Tempe, AZ | L 6–24 | 46,257 | |
| November 1 | at New Mexico | University Stadium; Albuquerque, NM | L 3–23 | 13,126 | |
| November 8 | Colorado State | Sun Bowl; El Paso, TX | L 17–21 | 11,150 | |
| November 15 | at Hawaii* | Aloha Stadium; Halawa, HI | L 9–21 | 18,664 | |
| November 22 | BYU | Sun Bowl; El Paso, TX | L 10–20 | 7,350 | |
*Non-conference game; ^{†}Homecoming; Rankings from AP Poll released prior to the game
