= 1975 New Mexico Lobos football team =

American college football season

1975 New Mexico Lobos football
- Conference: Western Athletic Conference
- Record: 6–5 (4–3 WAC)
- Head coach: Bill Mondt (2nd season)
- Home stadium: University Stadium

1975 Western Athletic Conference football standings
	Conf.					Overall
Team	W		L		T	W		L		T
No. 2 Arizona State $	7	–	0	–	0	12	–	0	–	0
No. 18 Arizona	5	–	2	–	0	9	–	2	–	0
Colorado State	4	–	2	–	0	6	–	5	–	0
BYU	4	–	3	–	0	6	–	5	–	0
New Mexico	4	–	3	–	0	6	–	5	–	0
Utah	1	–	4	–	0	1	–	10	–	0
Wyoming	1	–	6	–	0	2	–	9	–	0
UTEP	0	–	6	–	0	1	–	10	–	0
$ – Conference champion; Rankings from AP Poll

The 1975 New Mexico Lobos football team was an American football team that represented the University of New Mexico in the Western Athletic Conference (WAC) during the 1975 NCAA Division I football season. In their second season under head coach Bill Mondt, the Lobos compiled a 6–5 record (4–3 against WAC opponents) and outscored opponents by a total of 291 to 232.

Steve Myer and Randy Rich were the team captains. The team's statistical leaders included Steve Myer with 2,501 passing yards, Mike Williams with 511 rushing yards, Preston Dennard with 962 receiving yards, and Gil Stewart and Preston Dennard, each with 36 points scored.

== Schedule ==
Date	Opponent	Site	Result	Attendance	Source
September 13	Fresno State*	University Stadium; Albuquerque, NM	W 29–0	19,139	
September 20	at Texas Tech*	Jones Stadium; Lubbock, TX	L 17–24	39,160	
September 27	Colorado State	University Stadium; Albuquerque, NM	L 16–27	24,743	
October 3	at BYU	Cougar Stadium; Provo, UT	L 15–16	25,140	
October 11	No. 11 Arizona State	University Stadium; Albuquerque, NM	L 10–16	20,045	
October 18	Utah^{†}	University Stadium; Albuquerque, NM	W 27–23	15,010	
October 25	at No. 13 Arizona	Arizona Stadium; Tucson, AZ (rivalry)	W 44–34	35,878	
November 1	UTEP	University Stadium; Albuquerque, NM	W 23–3	13,126	
November 8	at San Jose State*	Spartan Stadium; San Jose, CA	L 20–29	17,000	
November 15	Wyoming	University Stadium; Albuquerque, NM	W 38–32	13,791	
November 22	at New Mexico State*	Memorial Stadium; Las Cruces, NM (rivalry)	W 52–28	11,216	
*Non-conference game; ^{†}Homecoming; Rankings from AP Poll released prior to the game

== Roster ==
1975 New Mexico Lobos football team roster
Players
Coaches
Offense

Pos.	#	Name	Class
OT	70	Mike Andrakowicz	Jr
G	76	Edger Bell	Sr
G	53	Ken Brown	Sr
QB	12	Ken Bryant	So
WR	80	Preston Dennard	So
G	62	Tom Morris	Jr
QB	11	Steve Myer	Sr
OT	74	Jim Ring	So
OT	68	Steve Stackhouse	So
WR	88	Gil Stewart	Sr
C	63	Steve Wilson	Sr

Defense

Pos.	#	Name	Class
DE	90	Robin Cole	Jr
DT	73	Andy Frederick	Jr
S	36	Jerry Jackson	So
DB	22	Bob Johnson	Sr
FS	18	Randy Rich	Sr
LB	66	Mark Rupcich	Sr
DB	20	Ronnie Wallace	Sr

Special teams

Pos.	#	Name	Class
K	87	Bo Breg	Sr
K	83	Mike Fox	So
K	89	Jim Haynes	So

Head coach

- Bill Mondt

Coordinators/assistant coaches

- Gene Huey – Wide receivers

Legend

- (C) Team captain
- (S) Suspended
- (I) Ineligible
- Injured
- Redshirt
