= 1975 BYU Cougars football team =

American college football season

1975 BYU Cougars football
- Conference: Western Athletic Conference
- Record: 6–5 (4–3 WAC)
- Head coach: LaVell Edwards (4th season)
- Offensive coordinator: Dave Kragthorpe (6th season)
- Offensive scheme: West Coast
- Defensive coordinator: Dick Felt (4th season)
- Base defense: 4–3
- Home stadium: Cougar Stadium

1975 Western Athletic Conference football standings
	Conf.					Overall
Team	W		L		T	W		L		T
No. 2 Arizona State $	7	–	0	–	0	12	–	0	–	0
No. 18 Arizona	5	–	2	–	0	9	–	2	–	0
Colorado State	4	–	2	–	0	6	–	5	–	0
BYU	4	–	3	–	0	6	–	5	–	0
New Mexico	4	–	3	–	0	6	–	5	–	0
Utah	1	–	4	–	0	1	–	10	–	0
Wyoming	1	–	6	–	0	2	–	9	–	0
UTEP	0	–	6	–	0	1	–	10	–	0
$ – Conference champion; Rankings from AP Poll

The 1975 BYU Cougars football team represented Brigham Young University during the 1975 NCAA Division I football season. The Cougars were led by fourth-year head coach LaVell Edwards and played their home games at Cougar Stadium in Provo, Utah. The team competed as a member of the Western Athletic Conference, finishing tied for fourth with a conference record of 4–3.

== Schedule ==
Date	Opponent	Site	Result	Attendance	Source
September 13	Bowling Green*	Cougar Stadium; Provo, UT	L 21–23	29,718	
September 20	at Colorado State	Hughes Stadium; Fort Collins, CO	L 17–21	27,491	
September 27	at No. 13 Arizona State	Sun Devil Stadium; Tempe, AZ	L 0–20	50,944	
October 3	New Mexico	Cougar Stadium; Provo, UT	W 16–15	25,140	
October 11	Air Force*^{†}	Cougar Stadium; Provo, UT	W 28–14	30,246	
October 25	at Wyoming	War Memorial Stadium; Laramie, WY	W 33–20	16,297	
November 1	No. 17 Arizona	Cougar Stadium; Provo, UT	L 20–36	25,287	
November 8	at Utah State*	Romney Stadium; Logan, UT	W 24–7	21,594	
November 15	Utah	Cougar Stadium; Provo, UT (Holy War)	W 51–20	28,265	
November 22	at UTEP	Sun Bowl; El Paso, TX	W 20–10	7,350	
November 29	at Southern Miss*	Mississippi Veterans Memorial Stadium; Jackson, MS	L 14–42	9,262	
*Non-conference game; ^{†}Homecoming; Rankings from AP Poll released prior to the game

== Game summaries ==
=== Air Force ===
Team	1	2	3	4	Total
Air Force	7	7	0	0	14
• BYU	0	7	7	14	28

- Date: October 11
- Location: Cougar Stadium, Provo, UT
- Game attendance: 30,246

Scoring summary
1	AF	Ken Wood 5-yard run (Dave Lawson kick)	AF 7-0
2	BYU	Jeff Blanc 7-yard run (Dave Taylor kick)	Tied 7-7
2	AF	Ken Wood 1-yard run (Dave Lawson kick)	AF 14-7
3	BYU	Jeff Nilsson 10-yard pass from Gifford Nielsen (Dave Taylor kick)	Tied 14-14
4	BYU	Charlie Ah You 1-yard run (Dave Taylor kick)	BYU 21-14
4	BYU	Charlie Ah You 1-yard run (Dave Taylor kick)	BYU 28-14

=== Utah ===
Gifford Nielsen passed and ran for two touchdowns and Brigham Young's defense turned Utah fumbles into three more scores in the 51–20 rout. Mark Uselman also kicked field goals of 47, 47 and 44 yards as the Cougars won their fourth in a row in the series.

== Roster ==
1975 BYU Cougars football team roster
Players
Coaches
Offense

Pos.	#	Name	Class
TE	80	Bill Allen	Sr
TE	87	Brian Billick	Jr
FB	33	Todd Christensen	So
OT	61	Chris Crowe	Sr
OT	70	David Hubbard	Jr
WR	88	Jay Miller	Jr
QB	14	Gifford Nielsen	So
C	55	Orrin Olsen	Sr
OT	78	Brad Oates	Sr
RB	35	Dan Van Valkenburg	Jr
QB	6	Marc Wilson	Fr

Defense

Pos.	#	Name	Class
DE	90	Kip Apostol	So
DB	10	Dave Campos	Jr
DB	5	Craig Jensen	Jr
DT	85	Scott Jepson	Jr
DE	83	Mat Mendenhall	Fr
LB	60	Rory Rauschenbach	Jr
DB	7	Gary Shaw	Sr

Special teams

Pos.	#	Name	Class
K	9	Mark Uselman	Sr

Head coach

- LaVell Edwards

Coordinators/assistant coaches

Legend

- (C) Team captain
- (S) Suspended
- (I) Ineligible
- Injured
- Redshirt

Roster
