= 1975 Sacramento State Hornets football team =

American college football season

1975 Sacramento State Hornets football
- Conference: Far Western Conference
- Record: 5–5 (2–3 FWC)
- Head coach: Ray Clemons (15th season)
- Home stadium: Hornet Stadium

1975 Far Western Conference football standings
	Conf.					Overall
Team	W		L		T	W		L		T
UC Davis $	5	–	0	–	0	7	–	3	–	0
Humboldt State	4	–	1	–	0	7	–	3	–	0
Sacramento State	2	–	3	–	0	5	–	5	–	0
San Francisco State	2	–	3	–	0	4	–	4	–	1
Chico State	2	–	3	–	0	4	–	6	–	0
Cal State Hayward	0	–	5	–	0	0	–	10	–	0
$ – Conference champion

The 1975 Sacramento State Hornets football team represented California State University, Sacramento as a member of the Far Western Conference (FWC) during the 1975 NCAA Division II football season. Led by Ray Clemons in his 15th and final season as head coach, Sacramento State compiled an overall record of 5–5 with a mark of 2–3 in conference play, placing in a three-way tie for third place in the FWC. The team was outscored by its opponents 181 to 139 for the season. The Hornets played home games at Hornet Stadium in Sacramento, California.

== Schedule ==
Date	Opponent	Site	Result	Attendance	Source
September 13	Saint Mary's*	Hornet Stadium; Sacramento, CA	W 20–13	5,000	
September 20	at Santa Clara*	Buck Shaw Stadium; Santa Clara, CA	L 14–20	7,610	
September 27	at Nevada*	Mackay Stadium; Reno, NV	W 36–16	3,500–3,525	
October 4	Cal Poly Pomona*	Hornet Stadium; Sacramento, CA	W 17–13	4,200—4,800	
October 11	at Humboldt State	Redwood Bowl; Arcata, CA	L 7–28	4,500–4,700	
October 18	at UC Davis	Toomey Field; Davis, CA (rivalry)	L 3–38	9,000–9,100	
October 25	San Francisco State	Hornet Stadium; Sacramento, CA	L 5–14	3,500	
November 1	Cal Lutheran*	Hornet Stadium; Sacramento, CA	L 10–30	3,500	
November 8	at Chico State	University Stadium; Chico, CA	W 12–9	3,000	
November 15	Cal State Hayward	Hornet Stadium; Sacramento, CA	W 15–0	3,000	
*Non-conference game
