= Jim Williams (American football, born 1928) =

American football player and coach (1928–1989)

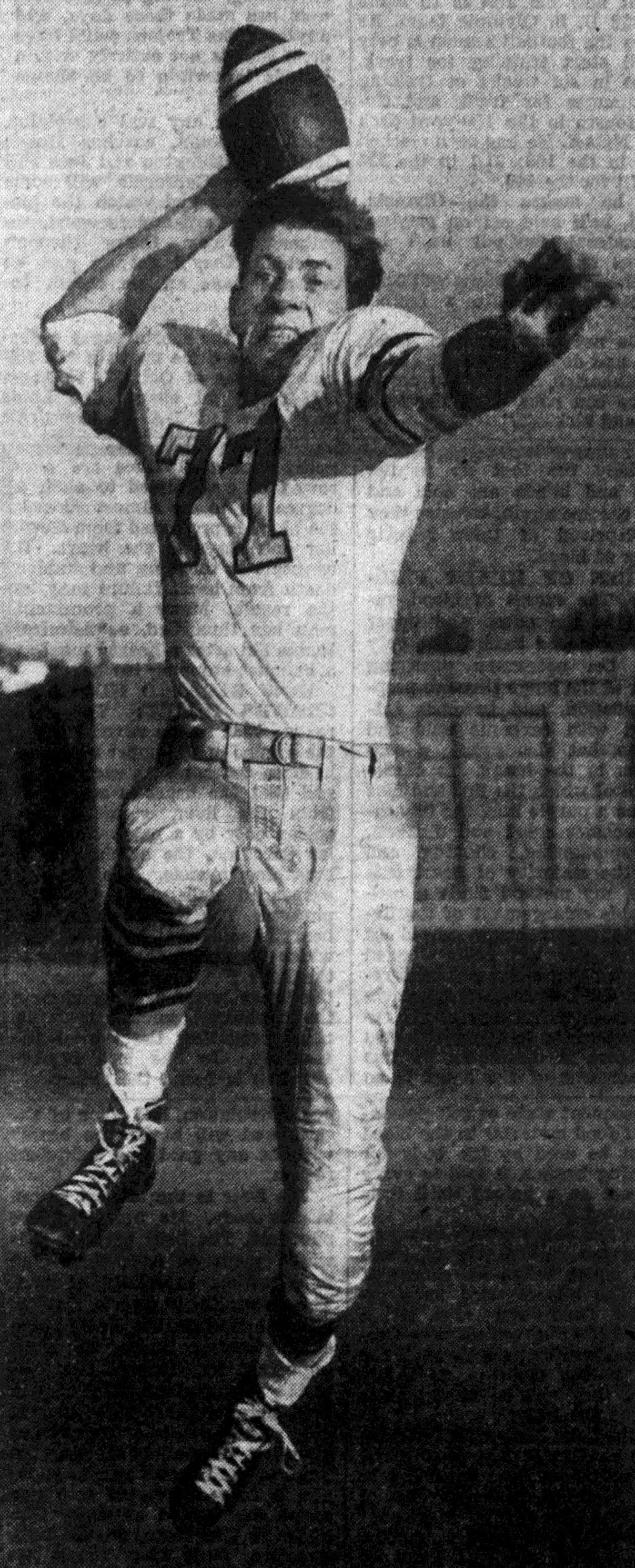
- Williams, circa 1951

Biographical details
- Born: December 23, 1928; McLaughlin, South Dakota, U.S.
- Died: June 11, 1989 (aged 60); Los Angeles County, California, U.S.

Playing career
- 1951–1953: Los Angeles State
- Positions: Fullback, quarterback

Coaching career (HC unless noted)
- 1954: Mount Carmel HS (CA) (assistant)
- 1955–1956: Mount Carmel HS (CA)
- 1958: Pius X HS (CA)
- 1959–1960: Los Angeles City (assistant)
- 1961–1964: Claremont-Mudd
- 1965: Cal State Los Angeles (assistant)
- 1966–1968: Cal State Los Angeles
- 1969–1970: Rio Hondo
- 1974–1975: Cal State Los Angeles

Head coaching record
- Overall: 33–49–2 (college); 12–8 (junior college); 23–3–2 (high school)
- Tournaments: 1–1 (California JC large division playoffs)

Accomplishments and honors

Championships
- 1 SCC (1970)

James Davidson Williams (December 23, 1928 – June 11, 1989) was an American football coach. He served as the head coach of the Claremont-Mudd Stags football program, representing Claremont McKenna College and Harvey Mudd College, from 1961 to 1964 and two stints as the head football coach at California State University, Los Angeles, from 1966 to 1968 and 1974 to 1975, compiling a career college football coaching record of 33–49–2.

Williams was born on December 23, 1928, in McLaughlin, South Dakota. He grew in up in Los Angeles, where attended and played football at Los Angeles High School, Los Angeles City College, and California State University, Los Angeles when it was known as Los Angeles State College. At Los Angeles City College he played as a quarterback in a T formation offense. At Los Angeles State he moved to fullback in a single-wing attack.

Williams died in Los Angeles County, California, on June 11, 1989.

== Head coaching record ==
=== College ===
Year	Team	Overall	Conference	Standing	Bowl/playoffs
Claremont-Mudd Stags (Southern California Intercollegiate Athletic Conference) (1961–1964)
1961	Claremont-Mudd	3–6	0–4	5th	
1962	Claremont-Mudd	4–5	2–2	3rd	
1963	Claremont-Mudd	3–6	NA	NA	
1964	Claremont-Mudd	6–3	2–3	4th	
Claremont-Mudd:		16–20	4–9		
Cal State Los Angeles Diablos (California Collegiate Athletic Association) (1966–1968)
1966	Cal State Los Angeles	4–6	2–3	T–4th	
1967	Cal State Los Angeles	1–9	0–5	6th	
1968	Cal State Los Angeles	6–3	2–2	T–2nd	
Cal State Los Angeles Diablos (California Collegiate Athletic Association) (1974–1975)
1974	Cal State Los Angeles	5–4–1	0–3–1	5th	
1975	Cal State Los Angeles	1–7–1	0–4	5th	
Cal State Los Angeles:		17–29–2	4–17–1		
Total:		33–49–2			

=== Junior college ===
Year	Team	Overall	Conference	Standing	Bowl/playoffs
Rio Hondo Roadrunners (Southern California Conference) (1969–1970)
1969	Rio Hondo	3–6	1–4	5th	
1970	Rio Hondo	9–2	5–0	1st	L California JC large division semifinal
Rio Hondo:		12–8	6–4		
Total:		12–8			
National championship Conference title Conference division title or championship game berth
