= 1975 Northern Arizona Lumberjacks football team =

American college football season

1975 Northern Arizona Lumberjacks football
- Conference: Big Sky Conference
- Record: 1–9 (0–6 Big Sky)
- Head coach: Joe Salem (1st season)
- Home stadium: Lumberjack Stadium

1975 Big Sky Conference football standings
| | Conf. | | | | | Overall |
| Team | W | | L | | T | W | | L | | T |
|---|---|---|---|---|---|---|---|---|---|---|
| No. 6 Boise State $^ | 5 | – | 0 | – | 1 | 9 | – | 2 | – | 1 |
| Idaho State | 4 | – | 2 | – | 0 | 7 | – | 3 | – | 0 |
| Montana State | 4 | – | 2 | – | 0 | 5 | – | 5 | – | 0 |
| Idaho | 2 | – | 2 | – | 2 | 4 | – | 5 | – | 2 |
| Montana | 3 | – | 3 | – | 0 | 6 | – | 4 | – | 0 |
| Weber State | 1 | – | 4 | – | 1 | 1 | – | 9 | – | 1 |
| Northern Arizona | 0 | – | 6 | – | 0 | 1 | – | 9 | – | 0 |
$ – Conference champion; ^ – NCAA Division II playoff participant; Rankings from NCAA Division II AP Poll

The 1975 Northern Arizona Lumberjacks football team represented Northern Arizona University as a member of the Big Sky Conference during the 1975 NCAA Division II football season. Led by first-year head coach Joe Salem, the Lumberjacks compiled an overall record of 1–9, with a mark of 0–6 in conference play, and finished seventh in the Big Sky.

== Schedule ==
| Date | Opponent | Site | Result | Attendance | Source |
|---|---|---|---|---|---|
| September 13 | UC Riverside* | Lumberjack Stadium; Flagstaff, AZ | W 34–30 | 8,000 | |
| September 20 | Idaho | Lumberjack Stadium; Flagstaff, AZ | L 12–22 | 10,000 | |
| September 27 | at Cal Poly Pomona* | Kellogg Field; Pomona, CA | L 0–3 | 4,000 | |
| October 4 | at No. 6 Idaho State | ASISU Minidome; Pocatello, ID | L 7–17 | 10,156 | |
| October 18 | Eastern Montana* | Lumberjack Stadium; Flagstaff, AZ | L 34–36 | 5,800 | |
| October 25 | at No. 5 Boise State | Bronco Stadium; Boise, ID | L 0–48 | 13,545 | |
| November 1 | at UNLV* | Las Vegas Stadium; Whitney, NV | L 21–34 | 9,048 | |
| November 8 | Montana State | Lumberjack Stadium; Flagstaff, AZ | L 17–31 | 7,000 | |
| November 15 | Montana | Lumberjack Stadium; Flagstaff, AZ | L 22–28 | 4,200 | |
| November 22 | at Weber State | Wildcat Stadium; Ogden, UT | L 8–19 | 3,346 | |
*Non-conference game; Rankings from AP Poll released prior to the game
