= 1975 San Jose State Spartans football team =

American college football season

1975 San Jose State Spartans football

PCAA champion
- Conference: Pacific Coast Athletic Association
- Record: 9–2 (5–0 PCAA)
- Head coach: Darryl Rogers (3rd season)
- Defensive coordinator: Bob Padilla (3rd season)
- Home stadium: Spartan Stadium

1975 Pacific Coast Athletic Association football standings
	Conf.					Overall
Team	W		L		T	W		L		T
San Jose State $	5	–	0	–	0	9	–	2	–	0
Long Beach State	4	–	1	–	0	9	–	2	–	0
San Diego State	3	–	2	–	0	8	–	3	–	0
Pacific (CA)	2	–	3	–	0	5	–	6	–	1
Fresno State	1	–	4	–	0	3	–	8	–	0
Cal State Fullerton	0	–	5	–	0	2	–	9	–	0
$ – Conference champion

The 1975 San Jose State Spartans football team represented San Jose State University during the 1975 NCAA Division I football season as a member of the Pacific Coast Athletic Association. (Note: The Big West Conference was known as the Pacific Coast Athletic Association from its founding in 1969 through 1987.) The team was led by third year head coach Darryl Rogers. They played home games at Spartan Stadium in San Jose, California. The Spartans finished the season as champions of the PCAA, with a record of nine wins and two losses (9–2, 5–0 PCAA).

== Schedule ==
Date	Opponent	Rank	Site	TV	Result	Attendance	Source
September 13	Santa Clara*		Spartan Stadium; San Jose, CA		W 13–0	1,704	
September 20	at Oregon*		Autzen Stadium; Eugene, OR		W 5–0	25,000	
September 27	at No. 18 Stanford*		Stanford Stadium; Stanford, CA (rivalry)	ABC	W 36–34	43,000	
October 4	at California*		California Memorial Stadium; Berkeley, CA		L 24–27	32,788	
October 11	at Long Beach State		Veterans Stadium; Long Beach, CA		W 30–7	11,874	
October 18	Pacific (CA)^{†}		Spartan Stadium; San Jose, CA (Victory Bell)		W 41–13	18,202	
October 25	Cal State Fullerton		Spartan Stadium; San Jose, CA		W 41–7	10,048	
November 1	at Fresno State		Ratcliffe Stadium; Fresno, California (rivalry)		W 21–7	6,979	
November 8	New Mexico*		Spartan Stadium; San Jose, CA		W 29–20	17,000	
November 15	San Diego State		Spartan Stadium; San Jose, CA	ABC	W 31–7	20,399	
November 29	at Hawaii*	No. 20	Aloha Stadium; Halawa, HI (rivalry)		L 20–30	21,697	
*Non-conference game; ^{†}Homecoming; Rankings from AP Poll released prior to the game

== Team players in the NFL ==
The following were selected in the 1976 NFL draft.

Player	Position	Round	Overall	NFL team
Kim Bokamper	Defensive end – Linebacker	1	19	Miami Dolphins
Carl Ekern	Linebacker	5	128	Los Angeles Rams
Darryl Jenkins	Linebacker	17	473	San Francisco 49ers
