= Jerome Dove =

American football player (1953–2019)

No. 48
- Position: Defensive back

Personal information
- Born: October 3, 1953; Newport News, Virginia, U.S.
- Died: August 2, 2019 (aged 65); Newport News, Virginia, U.S.
- Listed height: 6 ft 0 in (1.83 m)
- Listed weight: 190 lb (86 kg)

Career information
- High school: Huntington (VA); Menchville (VA)
- College: Colorado State
- NFL draft: 1976: 8th round, 220th overall pick

Career history
- San Diego Chargers (1977–1980)

Career NFL statistics
- Interceptions: 2
- Fumble recoveries: 7
- Stats at Pro Football Reference

Jerome Dove (October 3, 1953 – August 2, 2019) was an American professional football defensive back in the National Football League (NFL) who played for the San Diego Chargers. He played college football for the Colorado State Rams.
