= Larry Gordon (American football) =

American football player (1954–1983)

No. 50
- Position: Linebacker

Personal information
- Born: July 8, 1954; Monroe, Louisiana, U.S.
- Died: June 25, 1983 (aged 28); Phoenix, Arizona, U.S.
- Listed height: 6 ft 4 in (1.93 m)
- Listed weight: 230 lb (104 kg)

Career information
- High school: Phoenix Union (AZ)
- College: Arizona State
- NFL draft: 1976: 1st round, 17th overall pick

Career history
- Miami Dolphins (1976–1982)

Awards and highlights
- Second-team All-American (1975)

Career NFL statistics
- Sacks: 17
- Fumble recoveries: 10
- Interceptions: 8
- Stats at Pro Football Reference

Larry Wayne Gordon (July 8, 1954 – June 25, 1983) was an American professional football player who was a linebacker for seven seasons in the National Football League (NFL) for the Miami Dolphins. A member of the Dolphins' Silver Anniversary team, he was in the starting lineup from his rookie season until his death.

During his college football career at Arizona State he played alongside future All-American and Dallas Cowboys linebacker, Bob Breunig. Together, they are viewed as the best linebacker tandem to ever play the position at ASU.

In 1976 Gordon won the Tommy Fitzgerald Award as the Dolphins' outstanding rookie in training camp. He would be named the team's outstanding LB twice in his career. In 1978 Gordon intercepted 3 passes in a 23–6 rout of the Oakland Raiders that clinched a wildcard berth for the Dolphins. In 1979 he set a team playoff record for the most fumble recoveries in a game (2 vs Pittsburgh).

Gordon collapsed while jogging in the desert outside Phoenix on June 25, 1983, and died about an hour later at a Phoenix hospital. His death was attributed to a congential heart disorder.

== See also ==
- List of gridiron football players who died during their careers
