= John Smith (running back) =

American football player (born 1954)

Profile
- Position: Running back

Personal information
- Born: September 1, 1954 (age 72); Sacramento, California, U.S.
- Listed height: 6 ft 0 in (1.83 m)
- Listed weight: 191 lb (87 kg)

Career information
- College: Boise State
- NFL draft: 1976: 3rd round, 75th overall pick

Career history
- Dallas Cowboys (1976); Kansas City Chiefs (1978)*; Washington Redskins (1979)*
- * Offseason or practice squad member only

Awards and highlights
- All-American (1975); Big Sky Offensive MVP (1975); All-Big Sky (1975); 2× second-team All-Big Sky (1973, 1974)

John Smith (born September 1, 1954) is an American former professional football player who was a running back in the National Football League (NFL) for the Dallas Cowboys. He played college football at Boise State University.

== College career ==
Smith attended Boise State University, where he was nicknamed "Super Needle" and became a three-year starter. As a sophomore, he had 87 carries for 572 yards (6.57 average) and 5 touchdowns. The next year, he had 87 carries for 510 yards (6.4 average) and 7 touchdowns.

In 1975, he produced 514 rushing yards on 87 carries (5.9 average) with 6 rushing touchdowns and 45 receptions for 854 yards (18.9 average) and 11 receiving touchdowns. He received All-Big Sky and Kodak All-American honors at the end of the year.

In his college career, he recorded 260 carries (school record) for 1,623 yards, 6.24 yards per carry (school record), 6.57 yards per carry in a season (school record), 18 rushing touchdowns, 87 receptions for 1,527 yards, 17.5 yards per reception (school record), 23 receiving touchdowns, 42 total touchdowns (school record), 252 points (school record) and 3,549 yards of all-purpose yards.

In 1985, he was inducted into the Boise State University Hall of Fame, as arguably the best all-purpose running back in school history.

== Professional career ==
=== Dallas Cowboys ===
Smith was selected by the Dallas Cowboys in the third round (75th overall) of the 1976 NFL draft, after dropping because although he was seen as a great athlete, he was considered light for a running back.

After a slow start in training camp, he seemed to be coming on with a 42-yard run and a touchdown against the Detroit Lions in pre-season, but suffered a broken foot in practice and was placed on the injured reserve list. He was waived before the start of the 1977 season.

=== Kansas City Chiefs ===
On January 25, 1978, he signed with the Kansas City Chiefs but was released on August 15.

=== Washington Redskins ===
On March 1, 1979, he signed with the Washington Redskins and was waived on August 6.
