= 1976 Orange Bowl =

American college football game

- 42nd Orange Bowl
- The Miami Orange Bowl in Miami, Florida, hosted the Orange Bowl.
Michigan Wolverines	Oklahoma Sooners
(8–1–2)	(10–1)
Big Ten	Big Eight
6	14
Head coach: Bo Schembechler	Head coach: Barry Switzer
AP / Coaches; 5 / 4	AP / Coaches; 3 / 2
	1	2	3	4	Total
Michigan	0	0	0	6	6
Oklahoma	0	7	0	7	14
- Date: January 1, 1976
- Season: 1975
- Stadium: Orange Bowl
- Location: Miami, Florida
- MVP: Steve Davis (Oklahoma QB); Lee Roy Selmon (Oklahoma DT)
- Favorite: Oklahoma by 6 points
- Referee: R. Pete Williams (SEC)
- Attendance: 80,307

United States TV coverage
- Network: NBC
- Announcers: Jim Simpson, John Brodie
- Nielsen ratings: 27.9

The 1976 Orange Bowl was the 42nd edition of the college football bowl game, played at the Orange Bowl in Miami, Florida, on Thursday, January 1. Part of the 1975–76 bowl game season, it matched the fifth-ranked Michigan Wolverines of the Big Ten Conference and the #3 Oklahoma Sooners of the Big Eight Conference. In the first meeting between these two teams, favored Oklahoma won 14–6.

This was the sixth and final Orange Bowl played on artificial turf; Poly-Turf, similar to AstroTurf, was installed before the 1970 season and two versions lasted six seasons. It was removed in early 1976, following Super Bowl X, and replaced with natural grass.

This was the first time the Orange Bowl used officials from a neutral conference (in this instance, the Southeastern). In previous years, a split crew consisting of officials from each team's conference (the Big Ten when independent Notre Dame participated) were put together.

== Teams ==
=== Michigan ===
The Wolverines (8–1–2) were the runner-up in the Big Ten Conference, after falling to rival Ohio State in Ann Arbor, 21–14. This was the first season that the Big Ten (and Pac-8) allowed multiple bowl teams.

Michigan was the first Big Ten team to play in the Orange Bowl. Michigan State played in the 1938 Orange Bowl, but was not a member of the Big Ten in football until 1953.

=== Oklahoma ===
The Sooners were co-champions in the Big Eight Conference with Nebraska. Oklahoma opened with eight wins before an unexpected 23–3 loss at home to Kansas, which snapped a 28-game winning streak (37-game unbeaten streak) and dropped them from second to sixth in the rankings. With wins over Missouri and Nebraska, they rose to third.

== Game summary ==
1976 Orange Bowl

Quarter	1	2	3	4	Total
No.5 Michigan	0	0	0	6	6
No. 3 Oklahoma	0	7	0	7	14

at Orange Bowl • Miami, Florida

- Date: Thursday, January 1, 1976
- Game time: 7:45 p.m EST
- Game attendance: 80,307
- Referee: R. Pete Williams (SEC)
- TV announcers (NBC): Jim Simpson (play-by-play) and John Brodie (color)

Game information

First quarter
No scoring
Second quarter

- OKL Billy Brooks 39-yard run (Tony DiRienzo kick) OKL 7–0

Third quarter
No scoring
Fourth quarter

- OKL Steve Davis 10-yard run (Tony DiRienzo kick) OKL 14–0
- MICH Gordon Bell 2-yard run (run failed) OKL 14–6

=== Statistics ===
Statistics	MICH	OKLA
First downs	12	16
Plays–yards		
Rushes–yards	52–169	65–282
Passing yards	33	63
Passing: comp–att–int	2–20–3	3–5–0
Time of possession		

Team	Category	Player	Statistics
Michigan	Passing		
Michigan	Rushing		
Michigan	Receiving		
Oklahoma	Passing		
Oklahoma	Rushing		
Oklahoma	Receiving		

== Aftermath ==
With top-ranked Ohio State's loss in the Rose Bowl, the Sooners were voted national champions. (Since the previous poll in early December, #2 Texas A&M lost twice and fell out of the top ten.)
