= 1976 Oakland Raiders season =

NFL team season

- Owner: Al Davis
- General manager: Al Davis
- Head coach: John Madden
- Home stadium: Oakland–Alameda County Coliseum

Results
- Record: 13–1
- Division place: 1st AFC West
- Playoffs: Won Divisional Playoffs (vs. Patriots) 24–21; Won AFC Championship (vs. Steelers) 24–7; Won Super Bowl XI (vs. Vikings) 32–14

The 1976 Oakland Raiders season was the team's 17th season, and 7th in the National Football League (NFL).

After having appeared in the three previous AFC Championship Games – and having lost all three—the 1976 Raiders finally won the conference championship, and went on to win their first Super Bowl.

After posting a 13–1 regular season record and winning their sixth AFC West championship in seven seasons, and their fifth consecutive one, the Raiders won against both the New England Patriots and Pittsburgh Steelers to achieve the team's second Super Bowl berth. Then, on January 9, 1977, at the Rose Bowl, the Raiders won Super Bowl XI by rolling over the Minnesota Vikings 32–14. With this victory, the Raiders achieved a 16–1 (.941) overall record. They were the best team in the NFL in 1976.

In 2012, the 1976 Oakland Raiders were named the greatest team of all time by NFL.com's "Bracketology"; a 15-day, six-round fan vote tournament that featured the 64 greatest teams from the Super Bowl era. Oakland beat the 2000 Baltimore Ravens in the final round by a .8% margin. The NFL on its 100th anniversary named the 1976 Raiders #8 on the 100 greatest teams of all time.

== Offseason ==
1976 Raiders draft selections
Round	Overall	Player	Position	College
2	34	Charles Philyaw	DE	Texas Southern
2	50	Jeb Blount	QB	Tulsa
3	84	Rik Bonness	LB	Nebraska
4	110	Herb McMath	DE	Morningside
5	146	Fred Steinfort	K	Boston College
7	204	Clarence Chapman	WR	Eastern Michigan
8	220	Jerome Dove	DB	Colorado State
8	231	Terry Kunz	HB	Colorado
10	286	Dwight Lewis	DB	Purdue
11	313	Rick Jennings	HB	Maryland
12	343	Cedric Brown	S	Kent State
13	367	Craig Crnick	DE	Idaho
13	370	Mark Young	G	Washington State
14	397	Calvin Young	HB	Fresno State
15	427	Carl Hargrave	DB	Upper Iowa
16	454	Doug Hogan	DB	Southern California
17	478	Buddy Tate	DB	Tulsa
17	481	Nate Beasley	HB	Delaware

== Personnel ==
=== Staff / Coaches ===
1976 Oakland Raiders staff
Front office: Principal Owner/General Manager - Al Davis; Minority Co-Owner - Eddie McGah; President of the General Partner / General Manager – Al Davis; Senior Executive – John Herrera; Executive Assistant / Scout - Al LoCasale; Head coaches: Head Coach – John Madden; Assistant Head Coach / Executive Assistant - Tom Flores; Offensive coaches: Offensive Backs – Lew Erber; Receivers Coach – Tom Flores; Offensive line – Ollie Spencer	Defensive coaches: Defensive Line – Tom Dahms; Linebackers – Don Shinnick; Defensive Backfield – Bob Zeman; Special teams coaches: Special teams – Joe Scannella

=== Roster ===
1976 Oakland Raiders roster
Quarterbacks (QB): 11 David Humm; 15 Mike Rae; 12 Ken Stabler; Running backs (RB): 40 Pete Banaszak; 28 Clarence Davis; 31 Carl Garrett; 29 Hubert Ginn; 36 Manfred Moore; 30 Mark van Eeghen; Wide receivers (WR): 25 Fred Biletnikoff; 81 Morris Bradshaw; 21 Cliff Branch; 49 Mike Siani; Tight ends (TE): 46 Warren Bankston; 87 Dave Casper	Offensive linemen (OL): 64 George Buehler G; 50 Dave Dalby C; 70 Henry Lawrence T; 79 Dan Medlin G; 78 Art Shell T; 66 Steve Sylvester G/C; 63 Gene Upshaw G; 75 John Vella T; Defensive linemen (DL): 72 John Matuszak DE; 61 Herb McMath DE; 77 Charles Philyaw DE; 74 Dave Rowe NT; 60 Otis Sistrunk DE	Linebackers (LB): 51 Rodrigo Barnes ILB; 54 Rik Bonness OLB; 39 Willie Hall ILB; 83 Ted Hendricks OLB; 58 Monte Johnson ILB; 52 Floyd Rice OLB; 41 Phil Villapiano OLB; Defensive backs (DB): 43 George Atkinson SS; 24 Willie Brown CB; 20 Neal Colzie CB; 47 Charlie Phillips SS; 32 Jack Tatum FS; 26 Skip Thomas CB; Special teams (ST): 8 Ray Guy P; 14 Errol Mann K	Reserve: 18 Jeb Blount QB (IR); 44 Marv Hubbard RB (IR); 82 Horace Jones DE (IR); 71 Kelvin Korver NT (IR); 34 Terry Kunz RB (IR); 89 Ted Kwalick TE (IR); 4 Fred Steinfort K (IR); 80 Art Thoms NT (IR); Rookies in italics

Defense

FS
Jack Tatum
⋅

WLB	ILB	ILB	SLB
Ted Hendricks	Monte Johnson	Willie Hall	⋅
⋅	⋅	⋅	⋅

SS
43 George Atkinson
⋅

CB
Skip Thomas
⋅

DE	NT	DE
Otis Sistrunk	Dave Rowe	John Matuszak
⋅	⋅	Charles Philyaw

CB
Willie Brown
⋅

Offense

WR
Fred Biletnikoff
⋅

LT	LG	C	RG	RT
Art Shell	Gene Upshaw	Dave Dalby	George Buehler	John Vella
⋅	⋅	⋅	⋅	⋅

TE
Dave Casper
⋅

WR
Cliff Branch
⋅

QB
Ken Stabler
⋅

RB
Clarence Davis
⋅

FB
Mark van Eeghen
⋅

Special teams
PK Errol Mann
PK Fred Steinfort (1st 7 games)
P Ray Guy
KR Carl Garrett
PR Neal Colzie

== Season summary ==
The Road to their first World Championship began on opening day, as they hosted the two-time reigning world champion Pittsburgh Steelers. Oakland trailed 28–14 with just over five minutes to play, yet orchestrated what many to this day refer to as their Comeback Classic of 1976. They won 31–28 on a 21-yard Fred Steinfort field goal with 18 seconds left.

What followed was a mammoth five-game road trip, featuring wins over each of the Raiders' three divisional foes. It also included Oakland's lone loss on the year, a 48–17 shocker at New England. However, this would just be a preview of things to come between the Raiders and the Patriots.

Oakland's first six wins were by a total of 28 points. Coupled with the loss, the Raiders actually were outscored 151–148 despite a 6–1 record. But they became virtually unbeatable after the defeat. Upon returning home, they cruised to big victories, like a 49–16 stomping of the expansion Tampa Bay Buccaneers and had nail biters like the 28–27 victory against a competitive Chicago Bear team at Soldier Field. They closed out the season with a 24–0 shutout of the San Diego Chargers in Oakland, and ended allowing only 16 points total to division foes Denver, Kansas City and San Diego at home (Tampa Bay was also in the AFC West, finishing 0–14).

The Raiders ended the 1976 season with 64.3% of their passes completed; Ken Stabler completed 66.7% of his passes. Fullback Mark van Eeghen passed the 1,000-yard mark at 1,012 yards. Tight end Dave Casper led the team in receptions with 53, while side receiver Cliff Branch led in reception yards (1,111), touchdowns (12), and yards per reception for receivers who caught more than one pass (24.2).

== Preseason ==
Week	Date	Opponent	Result	Record	Venue	Attendance	Recap
1	July 31	Dallas Cowboys	W 17–14	1–0	Oakland–Alameda County Coliseum	52,391	Recap
2	August 7	vs. St. Louis Cardinals	W 20–9	2–0	Sun Devil Stadium (Tempe, Arizona)	33,216	Recap
3	August 13	at New York Jets	W 41–17	3–0	Yankee Stadium	10,726	Recap
4	August 21	Los Angeles Rams	L 14–23	3–1	Oakland–Alameda County Coliseum	52,615	Recap
5	August 29	at San Francisco 49ers	W 14–9	4–1	Candlestick Park	52,704	Recap
6	September 4	Seattle Seahawks	W 45–28	5–1	Oakland–Alameda County Coliseum	51,487	Recap

== Regular season ==
Week	Date	Opponent	Result	Record	Venue	Attendance	Recap
1	September 12	Pittsburgh Steelers	**W** 31–28	1–0	Oakland–Alameda County Coliseum	51,371	Recap
2	September 20	at **Kansas City Chiefs**	**W** 24–21	2–0	Arrowhead Stadium	60,884	Recap
3	September 26	at Houston Oilers	**W** 14–13	3–0	Astrodome	42,338	Recap
4	October 3	at New England Patriots	**L** 17–48	3–1	Schaefer Stadium	61,068	Recap
5	October 10	at **San Diego Chargers**	**W** 27–17	4–1	San Diego Stadium	50,523	Recap
6	October 17	at **Denver Broncos**	**W** 17–10	5–1	Mile High Stadium	63,431	Recap
7	October 24	Green Bay Packers	**W** 18–14	6–1	Oakland–Alameda County Coliseum	52,232	Recap
8	October 31	**Denver Broncos**	**W** 19–6	7–1	Oakland–Alameda County Coliseum	52,169	Recap
9	November 7	at Chicago Bears	**W** 28–27	8–1	Soldier Field	53,585	Recap
10	November 14	**Kansas City Chiefs**	**W** 21–10	9–1	Oakland–Alameda County Coliseum	48,259	Recap
11	November 21	at Philadelphia Eagles	**W** 26–7	10–1	Veterans Stadium	65,990	Recap
12	November 28	**Tampa Bay Buccaneers**	**W** 49–16	11–1	Oakland–Alameda County Coliseum	49,590	Recap
13	December 6	Cincinnati Bengals	**W** 35–20	12–1	Oakland–Alameda County Coliseum	52,430	Recap
14	December 12	**San Diego Chargers**	**W** 24–0	13–1	Oakland–Alameda County Coliseum	50,102	Recap
Note: Intra-division opponents are in **bold** text.

=== Game notes ===
==== Week 1: vs. Pittsburgh Steelers ====
Pittsburgh Steelers at Oakland Raiders

Team	1	2	3	4	Total
Steelers	0	7	7	14	28
• **Raiders**	0	7	0	24	31

- Date: September 12
- Location: Oakland–Alameda County Coliseum, Oakland, California
- Game start: 1:00 p.m. PST
- Game weather: 62 °F (17 °C), wind 8 mph (13 km/h)
- Referee: Jim Tunney
- TV announcers (NBC): Curt Gowdy and Don Meredith
- Source: Pro-Football-Reference.com

==== Week 2: at Kansas City Chiefs ====
Oakland Raiders at Kansas City Chiefs

Team	1	2	3	4	Total
• **Raiders**	7	10	0	7	24
Chiefs	0	0	7	14	21

- Date: September 20
- Location: Arrowhead Stadium, Kansas City, Missouri
- Game start: 8:00 p.m. CST
- Game weather: 66 °F (19 °C), wind 13 mph (21 km/h)
- Referee: Ben Dreith
- TV announcers (ABC): Frank Gifford, Howard Cosell, and Alex Karras
- Source: Pro-Football-Reference.com

==== Week 3: at Houston Oilers ====
Oakland Raiders at Houston Oilers

Team	1	2	3	4	Total
• **Raiders**	0	7	0	7	14
Oilers	6	0	0	7	13

- Date: September 26
- Location: Houston Astrodome, Houston, Texas
- Game start: 1:00 p.m. CST
- Game weather: indoors (dome)
- Referee: Cal Lepore
- Source: Pro-Football-Reference.com

==== Week 4: at New England Patriots ====
Oakland Raiders at New England Patriots

Team	1	2	3	4	Total
Raiders	0	10	0	7	17
• **Patriots**	7	14	14	13	48

- Date: October 3
- Location: Schaefer Stadium, Foxboro, Massachusetts
- Game start: 1:00 p.m. EST
- Game weather: 60 °F (16 °C), wind 10 mph (16 km/h)
- Referee: Bernie Ulman
- Source: Pro-Football-Reference.com

==== Week 5: at San Diego Chargers ====
Oakland Raiders at San Diego Chargers

Team	1	2	3	4	Total
• **Raiders**	7	7	0	13	27
Chargers	7	0	3	7	17

- Date: October 10
- Location: San Diego Stadium, San Diego, California
- Game start: 1:00 p.m. PST
- Source: Pro-Football-Reference.com

==== Week 6: at Denver Broncos ====
Oakland Raiders at Denver Broncos

Team	1	2	3	4	Total
• **Raiders**	0	3	14	0	17
Broncos	0	10	0	0	10

- Date: October 17
- Location: Mile High Stadium, Denver, Colorado
- Game start: 1:00 p.m. MST
- Source: Pro-Football-Reference.com

==== Week 7: vs. Green Bay Packers ====
Green Bay Packers at Oakland Raiders

Team	1	2	3	4	Total
Packers	7	0	0	7	14
• **Raiders**	0	18	0	0	18

- Date: October 24
- Location: Oakland–Alameda County Coliseum, Oakland, California
- Game start: 1:00 p.m. PST
- Referee: Ben Dreith
- Source: Pro-Football-Reference.com

==== Week 8: vs. Denver Broncos ====
Denver Broncos at Oakland Raiders

Team	1	2	3	4	Total
Broncos	6	0	0	0	6
• **Raiders**	3	0	3	13	19

- Date: October 31
- Location: Oakland–Alameda County Coliseum, Oakland, California
- Game start: 1:00 p.m. PST
- Referee: Cal Lepore
- Source: Pro-Football-Reference.com

==== Week 9 at Chicago Bears ====
Week Nine: Oakland Raiders (7–1) at Chicago Bears (4–4)

Quarter	1	2	3	4	Total
**Raiders**	0	14	7	7	**28**
Bears	7	0	20	0	**27**

at Soldier Field, Chicago, Illinois

- Date: November 7, 1976
- Game time: 2:00 p.m. EST
- Game weather: Sunny, 36 °F (2 °C)
- Game attendance: 53,585
- Referee: Chuck Heberling
- Box Score

Game information

**First quarter**

- CHI – Walter Payton 5-yard run (Bob Thomas kick). Bears 7–0.

**Second quarter**

- OAK – Dave Casper 17-yard pass from Ken Stabler (Errol Mann kick). Tie 7–7.
- OAK – Cliff Branch 75-yard pass from Ken Stabler (Errol Mann kick). Raiders 14–7.

**Third quarter**

- OAK – Clarence Davis 2-yard run (Errol Mann kick). Raiders 21–7.
- CHI – James Scott 36-yard pass from Bob Avellini (Bob Thomas kick). Raiders 21–14.
- CHI – Walter Payton 12-yard run (kick failed). Raiders 21–20.
- CHI – Walter Payton 2-yard run (Bob Thomas kick). Bears 27–21.

**Fourth quarter**

- OAK – Cliff Branch 49-yard pass from Ken Stabler (Errol Mann kick). Raiders 28–27.

Top passers

- OAK – Ken Stabler – 11/17, 234 yards, 3 TD
- CHI – Bob Avellini – 10/18, 204 yards, TD, INT

Top rushers

- OAK – Mark van Eeghen – 12 rushes, 62 yards
- CHI – Walter Payton – 36 rushes, 97 yards, 3 TD

Top receivers

- OAK – Cliff Branch – 5 receptions, 163 yards, 2 TD
- CHI – James Scott – 3 receptions, 76 yards, TD

Oakland escaped Chicago with a victory after a 31-yard field goal attempt by Bob Thomas with 15 seconds left got caught in a gust of wind and hit the upright.

==== Week 10: vs. Kansas City Chiefs ====
Kansas City Chiefs at Oakland Raiders

Team	1	2	3	4	Total
Chiefs	0	7	3	0	10
• **Raiders**	7	7	7	0	21

- Date: November 14
- Location: Oakland–Alameda County Coliseum, Oakland, California
- Game start: 1:00 p.m. PST
- Referee: Dick Jorgensen
- Source: Pro-Football-Reference.com

==== Week 11: at Philadelphia Eagles ====
Oakland Raiders at Philadelphia Eagles

Team	1	2	3	4	Total
• **Raiders**	12	0	7	7	26
Eagles	7	0	0	0	7

- Date: November 21
- Location: Veterans Stadium, Philadelphia
- Game start: 1:00 p.m. EST
- Referee: Bob Frederic
- Source: Pro-Football-Reference.com

==== Week 12: vs. Tampa Bay Buccaneers ====
Tampa Bay Buccaneers at Oakland Raiders

Team	1	2	3	4	Total
Buccaneers	7	3	0	6	16
• **Raiders**	7	14	21	7	49

- Date: November 28
- Location: Oakland–Alameda County Coliseum, Oakland, California
- Game start: 1:00 p.m. PST
- Referee: Fred Silva
- Source: Pro-Football-Reference.com

==== Week 13: vs. Cincinnati Bengals ====
Cincinnati Bengals at Oakland Raiders

Team	1	2	3	4	Total
Bengals	6	7	7	0	20
• **Raiders**	14	7	7	7	35

- Date: December 6
- Location: Oakland–Alameda County Coliseum, Oakland, California
- Game start: 6:00 p.m. PST
- Game weather: 52 °F (11 °C), wind 6 mph (9.7 km/h)
- Referee: Tommy Bell
- TV announcers (ABC): Frank Gifford, Howard Cosell and Alex Karras
- Source: Pro-Football-Reference.com

Scoring summary
1	Bengals	John McDaniel 40-yard pass from Ken Anderson (kick failed)	Bengals 6–0
1	Raiders	Dave Casper 24-yard pass from Ken Stabler (Errol Mann kick)	Raiders 7–6
1	Raiders	Dave Casper 3-yard pass from Ken Stabler (Errol Mann kick)	Raiders 14–6
2	Bengals	Stan Fritts 1-yard run (Chris Bahr kick)	Raiders 14–13
2	Raiders	Pete Banaszak 1-yard run (Errol Mann kick)	Raiders 21–13
3	Raiders	Cliff Branch 42-yard pass from Ken Stabler (Errol Mann kick)	Raiders 28–13
3	Bengals	Archie Griffin 21-yard run (Chris Bahr kick)	Raiders 28–20
4	Raiders	Fred Biletnikoff 7-yard pass from Ken Stabler (Errol Mann kick)	Raiders 35–20

On Monday night, the Steelers and Bengals playoff hopes rested in the hands of Oakland. If the Raiders won, Pittsburgh was in. If Cincinnati won, they were in. With the Raiders' victory, the Steelers tied the Bengals for first in the AFC Central. Pittsburgh would win the division on a tiebreaker.

==== Week 14: vs. San Diego Chargers ====
San Diego Chargers at Oakland Raiders

Team	1	2	3	4	Total
Chargers	0	0	0	0	0
• **Raiders**	7	10	7	0	24

- Date: December 12
- Location: Oakland–Alameda County Coliseum, Oakland, California
- Game start: 1:00 p.m. PST
- Referee: Jim Tunney
- Source: Pro-Football-Reference.com

=== Standings ===
AFC West
	W	L	T	PCT	DIV	CONF	PF	PA	STK
^{(1)} Oakland Raiders	13	1	0	.929	7–0	10–1	350	237	W10
Denver Broncos	9	5	0	.643	5–2	7–5	315	206	W2
San Diego Chargers	6	8	0	.429	2–5	4–8	248	285	L1
Kansas City Chiefs	5	9	0	.357	2–5	4–8	290	376	W1
Tampa Bay Buccaneers	0	14	0	.000	0–4	0–13	125	412	L14

== Playoffs ==
Round	Date	Opponent	Result	Record	Venue	Attendance
Divisional	December 18	New England Patriots	W 24–21	1–0	Oakland–Alameda County Coliseum	53,045
AFC Championship	December 26	Pittsburgh Steelers	W 24–7	2–0	Oakland–Alameda County Coliseum	53,739
Super Bowl XI	January 9, 1977	Minnesota Vikings	W 32–14	3–0	Rose Bowl	100,421

=== AFC Divisional: vs. New England Patriots ===
AFC Divisional Playoff
New England Patriots at Oakland Raiders

Team	1	2	3	4	Total
Patriots	7	0	14	0	21
• Raiders	3	7	0	14	24

- Date: December 18
- Location: Oakland–Alameda County Coliseum, Oakland, California
- Game start: 1:00 p.m. PST
- Referee: Ben Dreith
- TV announcers (NBC): Curt Gowdy and Don Meredith
- Source: Pro-Football-Reference.com

Raiders win and go to the AFC Championship Game and win to the Pittsburgh Steelers 24-7. And win Super Bowl XI to the Minnesota Vikings 32-14.

=== AFC Championship: vs. Pittsburgh Steelers ===
AFC Championship Game
Pittsburgh Steelers at Oakland Raiders

Team	1	2	3	4	Total
Steelers	0	7	0	0	7
• Raiders	3	14	7	0	24

- Date: December 26
- Location: Oakland–Alameda County Coliseum, Oakland, California
- Game start: 1:00 p.m. PST
- Referee: Tommy Bell
- Source: Pro-Football-Reference.com

Raiders win and go to Super Bowl XI where they faced the Minnesota Vikings and win 32-14.

=== Super Bowl XI: vs. Minnesota Vikings ===
Oakland Raiders 32, Minnesota Vikings 14

Quarter	1	2	3	4	Total
Raiders	0	16	3	13	32
Vikings	0	0	7	7	14

at Rose Bowl, Pasadena, California

- Date: January 9
- Game time: 12:50 pm. PST
- Game weather: 52 °F (11 °C), wind 6 mph (9.7 km/h), relative humidity 59%
- Referee: Jim Tunney
- TV announcers (NBC): Curt Gowdy, Don Meredith
- Pro-Football-Reference.com

Game information
Second quarter
- OAK – Errol Mann 24-yard field goal – Raiders 3-0
- OAK – Dave Casper 1-yard pass from Ken Stabler (Errol Mann kick) – Raiders 10-0
- OAK – Pete Banaszak 1-yard run (kick failed) – Raiders 16-0

Third quarter

- OAK – Errol Mann 40-yard field goal – Raiders 19-0
- MIN – Sammy White 8-yard pass from Fran Tarkenton (Fred Cox kick) – Raiders 19-7

Fourth quarter

- OAK – Pete Banaszak 2-yard run (Errol Mann kick) – Raiders 26-7
- OAK – Willie Brown 75-yard interception return (kick failed) – Raiders 32-7
- MIN – Stu Voigt 13-yard pass from Bob Lee (Fred Cox kick) – Raiders 32-14

Raiders win and in 1977 finished 11-3 and win in 2OT to the Baltimore Colts 37-31. But lost to the Super Bowl XII loser Denver Broncos in the AFC Championship Game 20-17.

== Awards and honors ==
- Ken Stabler, Bert Bell Award

== See also ==
- Oakland Raiders
- 1976 NFL season
- 1976 NFL draft
- 1976–77 NFL playoffs
