= 1975 Tulsa Golden Hurricane football team =

American college football season

1975 Tulsa Golden Hurricane football

MVC champion
- Conference: Missouri Valley Conference
- Record: 7–4 (4–0 MVC)
- Head coach: F. A. Dry (4th season)
- Home stadium: Skelly Stadium

1975 Missouri Valley Conference football standings
	Conf.					Overall
Team	W		L		T	W		L		T
Tulsa $	4	–	0	–	0	7	–	4	–	0
New Mexico State	2	–	2	–	0	5	–	6	–	0
West Texas State	2	–	2	–	0	5	–	6	–	0
Drake	1	–	3	–	0	3	–	8	–	0
Wichita State	1	–	3	–	0	3	–	8	–	0
$ – Conference champion

The 1975 Tulsa Golden Hurricane football team represented the University of Tulsa during the 1975 NCAA Division I football season. In their fourth year under head coach F. A. Dry, the Golden Hurricane compiled a 7–4 record, 4–0 against Missouri Valley Conference opponents, and won the conference championship.

The team's statistical leaders included Jeb Blount with 1,663 passing yards, Carlisle Cantrell with 914 rushing yards, and Steve Largent with 1,000 receiving yards. Largent went on to play 14 years in the National Football League and was inducted into the Pro Football Hall of Fame. Punter Rick Engles was selected as a first-team All-American by The Sporting News and Time magazine.

== Schedule ==
Date	Opponent	Site	Result	Attendance	Source
September 13	Kansas State*	Skelly Stadium; Tulsa, OK	L 16–17	34,000	
September 20	at West Texas State	Kimbrough Memorial Stadium; Canyon, TX	W 23–14	12,800	
September 27	at Arkansas*	Razorback Stadium; Fayetteville, AR	L 15–31	38,000	
October 4	at New Mexico State	Memorial Stadium; Las Cruces, NM	W 35–7	11,026	
October 11	Cincinnati*	Skelly Stadium; Tulsa, OK	W 24–16	27,000	
October 18	at Wichita State	Cessna Stadium; Wichita, KS	W 41–10	13,278	
October 25	Memphis State*^{†}	Skelly Stadium; Tulsa, OK	L 14–16	20,000	
November 1	Louisville*	Skelly Stadium; Tulsa, OK	W 38–14	14,500	
November 8	Drake	Skelly Stadium; Tulsa, OK	W 38–14	20,000	
November 15	Indiana State*	Skelly Stadium; Tulsa, OK	W 62–7	21,500	
November 29	at Houston*	Houston Astrodome; Houston, TX	L 30–42	12,127	
*Non-conference game; ^{†}Homecoming

== Roster ==
1975 Tulsa Golden Hurricane football team roster
Players
Coaches
Offense

Pos.	#	Name	Class
OT	77	Steve August	Sr
QB	18	Jeb Blount	Sr
OT	70	Greg Fairchild	Sr
WR	88	Jessie Green	Sr
G	78	Wes Hamilton	Sr
WR	83	Steve Largent	Sr
RB	27	Rickey Watts	Fr

Defense

Pos.	#	Name	Class
CB	22	Bubby Tate	Sr

Special teams

Pos.	#	Name	Class
P	13	Rick Engles	Sr

Head coach

- F. A. Dry

Coordinators/assistant coaches

Legend

- (C) Team captain
- (S) Suspended
- (I) Ineligible
- Injured
- Redshirt

== After the season ==
=== 1976 NFL draft ===
The following Golden Hurricane players were selected in the 1976 NFL draft following the season.

Round	Pick	Player	Position	NFL club
2	50	Jeb Blount	Quarterback	Oakland Raiders
3	85	Wes Hamilton	Guard	Minnesota Vikings
3	89	Rick Engles	Punter	Seattle Seahawks
4	116	Greg Fairchild	Guard	Cincinnati Bengals
4	117	Steve Largent	Wide receiver	Houston Oilers
10	274	Jessie Green	Wide receiver	Green Bay Packers
13	366	Bernie Head	Center	Miami Dolphins
17	478	Buddy Tate	Defensive back	Oakland Raiders
