= 1975 Oklahoma State Cowboys football team =

American college football season

1975 Oklahoma State Cowboys football
- Conference: Big Eight Conference
- Record: 7–4 (3–4 Big 8)
- Head coach: Jim Stanley (3rd season)
- Home stadium: Lewis Field

1975 Big Eight Conference football standings
	Conf.					Overall
Team	W		L		T	W		L		T
No. 1 Oklahoma +	6	–	1	–	0	11	–	1	–	0
No. 9 Nebraska +	6	–	1	–	0	10	–	2	–	0
No. 16 Colorado	5	–	2	–	0	9	–	3	–	0
Kansas	4	–	3	–	0	7	–	5	–	0
Missouri	3	–	4	–	0	6	–	5	–	0
Oklahoma State	3	–	4	–	0	7	–	4	–	0
Iowa State	1	–	6	–	0	4	–	7	–	0
Kansas State	0	–	7	–	0	3	–	8	–	0
+ – Conference co-champions; Rankings from AP Poll

The 1975 Oklahoma State Cowboys football team represented Oklahoma State University in the Big Eight Conference during the 1975 NCAA Division I football season. In their third season under head coach Jim Stanley, the Cowboys compiled a 7–5 record (3–4 against conference opponents), tied for fifth place in the conference, and outscored opponents by a combined total of 285 to 178.

The team's statistical leaders included Terry Miller with 1,026 rushing yards and 66 points scored, Charlie Weatherbie with 563 passing yards, and Sam Lisle with 384 receiving yards.

The team played its home games at Lewis Field in Stillwater, Oklahoma.

== Schedule ==
Date	Opponent	Rank	Site	Result	Attendance	Source
September 13	Wichita State*		Lewis Field; Stillwater, OK	W 34–0	28,800	
September 20	No. 16 Arkansas*		Lewis Field; Stillwater, OK	W 20–13	47,500	
September 27	North Texas State*	No. 17	Lewis Field; Stillwater, OK	W 61–7	30,000	
October 4	Texas Tech*	No. 15	Lewis Field; Stillwater, OK	W 17–16	43,500	
October 11	at No. 12 Missouri	No. 14	Faurot Field; Columbia, MO	L 14–41	60,323	
October 18	No. 4 Nebraska		Lewis Field; Stillwater, OK	L 20–28	48,500	
October 25	at Kansas		Memorial Stadium; Lawrence, KS	W 35–19	44,860	
November 1	No. 2 Oklahoma	No. 19	Lewis Field; Stillwater, OK (Bedlam Series)	L 7–27	51,220	
November 8	at No. 14 Colorado		Folsom Field; Boulder, CO	L 7–17	47,579	
November 15	Kansas State^{†}		Lewis Field; Stillwater, OK	W 56–3	40,100	
November 22	at Iowa State		Cyclone Stadium; Ames, IA	W 14–7	21,500	
*Non-conference game; ^{†}Homecoming; Rankings from AP Poll released prior to the game

== Roster ==
1975 Oklahoma State Cowboys football team roster
Players
Coaches
Offense

Pos.	#	Name	Class
G	66	Ron Baker	Jr
G	72	Derrel Gofourth	Jr
RB	43	Terry Miller	So
QB	15	Charlie Weatherbie	Jr

Defense

Pos.	#	Name	Class
LB	48	Mike Allen	Sr
DB	10	Scott Burk	So
LB	56	Don Edwards	Jr
DT	91	Phil Dokes	Jr
LB	92	James White	Sr

Special teams

Pos.	#	Name	Class
P	2	Cliff Parsley	Jr

Head coach

- Jim Stanley

Coordinators/assistant coaches

Legend

- (C) Team captain
- (S) Suspended
- (I) Ineligible
- Injured
- Redshirt

== After the season ==
The 1976 NFL draft was held on April 8–9, 1976. The following Cowboys were selected.

Round	Pick	Player	Position	NFL club
1	25	James White	Defensive tackle	Minnesota Vikings
7	197	Larry Harris	Defensive tackle	Houston Oilers
