= 1975 Drake Bulldogs football team =

American college football season

1975 Drake Bulldogs football
- Conference: Missouri Valley Conference
- Record: 3–8 (1–3 MVC)
- Head coach: Jack Wallace (11th season)
- Home stadium: Drake Stadium

1975 Missouri Valley Conference football standings
	Conf.					Overall
Team	W		L		T	W		L		T
Tulsa $	4	–	0	–	0	7	–	4	–	0
New Mexico State	2	–	2	–	0	5	–	6	–	0
West Texas State	2	–	2	–	0	5	–	6	–	0
Drake	1	–	3	–	0	3	–	8	–	0
Wichita State	1	–	3	–	0	3	–	8	–	0
$ – Conference champion

The 1975 Drake Bulldogs football team represented the Drake University as a member of the Missouri Valley Conference (MVC) during the 1975 NCAA Division I football season. Led by Jack Wallace in his 11th season has head coach, the Bulldogs compiled an overall record of 3–8 (1–3 in conference games), finished tied for fourth out of five teams in the MVC, and were oustscored by a total of 311 to 188.

On offense, the Bulldogs gained an average of 201.2 rushing yards and 123.5 passing yards per game. On defense, they gave up an average of 279.6 rushing yards and 133.8 passing yards per game. Running back Jim Herndon led the team with 1,013 rushing yards. Quarterback Jeff Martin tallied 1,150 passing yards, but threw 13 interceptions and finished the season with a 94.0 passer rating Tony Barnes led the team in receiving with 28 catches for 437 yards.

Drake played home games at Drake Stadium in Des Moines, Iowa.

== Schedule ==
Date	Opponent	Site	Result	Attendance	Source
September 6	at New Mexico State	Memorial Stadium; Las Cruces, NM	L 10–14		
September 13	North Texas State*	Drake Stadium; Des Moines, IA	L 3–7	13,249	
September 20	Louisville*	Drake Stadium; Des Moines, IA	W 31–7	8,120	
September 27	at Northeast Louisiana*	Brown Stadium; Monroe, LA	L 25–38	7,350	
October 11	Northern Iowa*	Drake Stadium; Des Moines, IA	L 24–27	10,365–10,368	
October 18	at West Texas State	Kimbrough Memorial Stadium; Canyon, TX	L 6–24	14,032	
October 25	Long Beach State*	Drake Stadium; Des Moines, IA	L 10–31	9,470	
November 1	at Southern Illinois*	McAndrew Stadium; Carbondale, IL	W 38–27	5,963	
November 8	at Tulsa	Skelly Stadium; Tulsa, OK	L 14–38	20,000	
November 15	Wichita State	Drake Stadium; Des Moines, IA	W 27–23	6,125	
November 22	at Temple*	Veterans Stadium; Philadelphia, PA	L 7–44	5,837	
*Non-conference game
