= 1975 Southwestern Louisiana Ragin' Cajuns football team =

American college football season

1975 Southwestern Louisiana Ragin' Cajuns football
- Conference: Southland Conference
- Record: 6–5 (2–3 Southland)
- Head coach: Augie Tammariello (2nd season)
- Home stadium: Cajun Field

1975 Southland Conference football standings
	Conf.					Overall
Team	W		L		T	W		L		T
Arkansas State $	5	–	0	–	0	11	–	0	–	0
Louisiana Tech	4	–	1	–	1	8	–	2	–	0
McNeese State	3	–	2	–	0	7	–	4	–	0
Southwestern Louisiana	2	–	3	–	0	6	–	5	–	0
UT Arlington	1	–	4	–	0	4	–	7	–	0
Lamar	0	–	5	–	0	1	–	10	–	0
$ – Conference champion

The 1975 Southwestern Louisiana Ragin' Cajuns football team was an American football team that represented the University of Southwestern Louisiana (now known as the University of Louisiana at Lafayette) in the Southland Conference during the 1975 NCAA Division I football season. In their second year under head coach Augie Tammariello, the team compiled a 6–5 record.

== Schedule ==
Date	Opponent	Site	Result	Attendance	Source
September 6	at Long Beach State*	Veterans Memorial Stadium; Long Beach, CA	W 22–17	10,482	
September 13	Southern Illinois*	Cajun Field; Lafayette, LA	W 27–10	21,223	
September 27	New Mexico State*	Cajun Field; Lafayette, LA	W 31–7	24,200	
October 4	at Arkansas State	Indian Stadium; Jonesboro, AR	L 17–39		
October 11	at Louisiana Tech	Joe Aillet Stadium; Ruston, LA	L 14–24	16,200	
October 18	Lamar	Cajun Field; Lafayette, LA	W 21–12		
October 25	at Cincinnati*	Nippert Stadium; Cincinnati, OH	L 17–23		
November 1	UT Arlington	Cajun Field; Lafayette, LA	W 35–32		
November 8	Pacific (CA)*	Cajun Field; Lafayette, LA	L 14–19		
November 15	Northwestern State*	Cajun Field; Lafayette, LA	W 40–17	15,175	
November 22	McNeese State	Cajun Field; Lafayette, LA	L 21–33		
*Non-conference game
