= Steve Davis (quarterback) =

American football player (1952–2013)

No. 5 – Oklahoma Sooners
- Position: Quarterback

Personal information
- Born: November 19, 1952; Bossier City, Louisiana, U.S.
- Died: March 17, 2013 (aged 60); South Bend, Indiana, U.S.

Career information
- High school: Sallisaw (OK)
- College: Oklahoma (1973–1975)

Awards and highlights
- 2× National champion (1974, 1975); 2× Second-team All-Big Eight (1973, 1974)

Steve Davis (November 19, 1952 – March 17, 2013) was a quarterback for the Oklahoma Sooners from 1973 to 1975. He was named the Most Valuable Player of the 1976 Orange Bowl, when the Sooners won their fifth national championship.

Davis led the Sooners to a 32–1–1 (.956) record as their starting quarterback, and holds the NCAA record for winning percentage in that position. With Davis at the helm of the wishbone offense, the Sooners won consecutive national titles in 1974 and 1975. Davis was later a commentator for ABC and CBS college football telecasts in the 1970s and 1980s.

Born at Barksdale Air Force Base in Bossier City, Louisiana, Davis was raised in Sallisaw, Oklahoma. Later in life a born again Christian, he featured as a speaker giving his Christian testimony.

== Death ==
Davis died at age 60 when the small jet in which he was a passenger crashed on approach in South Bend, Indiana, on March 17, 2013. The NTSB report later found that Davis, an experienced pilot but not in the Beechcraft Premier I being used that day, was allowed to fly the plane by the pilot-in-command. During their descent, at about 6700 feet and nine miles from the destination airport, Davis, misunderstanding an instruction from the pilot, inadvertently shut down both engines. Although the pilot was able to restart one engine, the aircraft crashed while attempting a go-around, killing Davis and the pilot. Two rear-seat passengers survived with serious injuries.
