= Rik Bonness =

American football player (born 1954)

No. 54, 53
- Position: Linebacker

Personal information
- Born: March 20, 1954 (age 72); Borger, Texas, U.S.
- Listed height: 6 ft 3 in (1.91 m)
- Listed weight: 220 lb (100 kg)

Career information
- High school: Bellevue (Nebraska)
- College: Nebraska
- NFL draft: 1976: 3rd round, 84th overall pick

Career history
- Oakland Raiders (1976); Tampa Bay Buccaneers (1977–1979); New York Giants (1980)*
- * Offseason or practice squad member only

Awards and highlights
- Super Bowl champion (XI); Unanimous All-American (1975); First-team All-American (1974); 2× First-team All-Big Eight (1974, 1975)

Career NFL statistics
- Games played: 59
- Games started: 2
- Stats at Pro Football Reference

Richard Kyes "Rik" Bonness (born March 20, 1954) is an American former professional football player who was linebacker for four seasons in the National Football League (NFL) with the Oakland Raiders and Tampa Bay Buccaneers. He played college football as a center for the Nebraska Cornhuskers, earning consensus All-American honors in 1975.

Born in Borger, Texas, Bonness played high school football at Bellevue High School in Bellevue, Nebraska, a suburb south of Omaha. He graduated in 1972 and then received a scholarship to the University of Nebraska–Lincoln in Lincoln, the two-time defending national champions under head coach Bob Devaney. Bonness and played center for the Conrnhuskers on the offensive line under new head coach Tom Osborne.

Following his senior season in 1975, Bonness was a consensus first-team All-American, having received first-team honors from Associated Press (AP), United Press International (UPI), Walter Camp Football Foundation (WCFF), American Football Coaches Association (AFCA), Football Writers Association of America (FWAA), and Football News.

The Oakland Raiders chose Bonness in the third round of the 1976 NFL draft (84th overall). He played linebacker as a pro and appeared in 59 games across four seasons for the Raiders (1976), Tampa Bay Buccaneers (1977–1979) and New York Giants (1980). He saw no regular season action in 1980.

During his rookie season, the Raiders won Super Bowl XI in January 1977.
