= 1975 Iowa State Cyclones football team =

American college football season

1975 Iowa State Cyclones football
- Conference: Big Eight Conference
- Record: 4–7 (1–6 Big 8)
- Head coach: Earle Bruce (3rd season)
- Defensive coordinator: Tom Harper (2nd season)
- Captains: Sy Bassett; Bob Bos; Jeff Jones; Ray King
- Home stadium: Cyclone Stadium

1975 Big Eight Conference football standings
	Conf.					Overall
Team	W		L		T	W		L		T
No. 1 Oklahoma +	6	–	1	–	0	11	–	1	–	0
No. 9 Nebraska +	6	–	1	–	0	10	–	2	–	0
No. 16 Colorado	5	–	2	–	0	9	–	3	–	0
Kansas	4	–	3	–	0	7	–	5	–	0
Missouri	3	–	4	–	0	6	–	5	–	0
Oklahoma State	3	–	4	–	0	7	–	4	–	0
Iowa State	1	–	6	–	0	4	–	7	–	0
Kansas State	0	–	7	–	0	3	–	8	–	0
+ – Conference co-champions; Rankings from AP Poll

The 1975 Iowa State Cyclones football team represented Iowa State University in the Big Eight Conference during the 1975 NCAA Division I football season. In their third year under head coach Earle Bruce, the Cyclones compiled a 4–7 record (1–6 against conference opponents), finished in seventh place in the conference, and were outscored by opponents by a combined total of 263 to 161. They played their home games at Cyclone Stadium (now known as Jack Trice Stadium) in Ames, Iowa.

Sy Bassett, Bob Bos, Jeff Jones, and Ray King were the team captains.

== Schedule ==
Date	Time	Opponent	Site	Result	Attendance	Source
September 13	10:05 p.m.	at No. 16 UCLA*	Los Angeles Memorial Coliseum; Los Angeles, CA	L 21–37	31,260	
September 20	1:30 pm	Air Force*	Cyclone Stadium; Ames, IA	W 17–12	42,000	
September 27	6:30 pm	at Florida State*	Doak Campbell Stadium; Tallahassee, FL	W 10–6	29,333	
October 4	8:30 pm	at Utah*	Robert Rice Stadium; Salt Lake City, UT	W 31–3	16,096	
October 11	1:30 pm	at Kansas State	KSU Stadium; Manhattan, KS (rivalry)	W 17–7	23,600	
October 18	2:30 pm	Kansas	Cyclone Stadium; Ames, IA	L 10–21	42,500	
October 25	1:30 pm	at No. 2 Oklahoma	Oklahoma Memorial Stadium; Norman, OK	L 7–39	72,086	
November 1	1:30 pm	No. 16 Colorado^{†}	Cyclone Stadium; Ames, IA	L 27–28	42,500	
November 8	1:30 pm	No. 19 Missouri	Cyclone Stadium; Ames, IA (rivalry)	L 14–44	41,500	
November 15	1:30 pm	at No. 2 Nebraska	Memorial Stadium; Lincoln, NE (rivalry)	L 0–52	76,131	
November 22	1:30 pm	Oklahoma State	Cyclone Stadium; Ames, IA	L 7–14	21,500	
*Non-conference game; ^{†}Homecoming; Rankings from AP Poll released prior to the game; All times are in Central time

== Roster ==
1975 Iowa State Cyclones football team roster
Players
Coaches
Offense

Pos.	#	Name	Class
WR	91	Luther Blue	Jr
G	67	Bob Bos	Sr
G	66	Kevin Cartier	Sr
TE	86	Al Dixon	Jr
RB	23	Frank Cooper	So
OT	68	Kevin Cunningham	So
RB	21	Jeff Curry	Fr
OT	74	Pierre Gelinas	Sr
RB	24	Dexter Green	Fr
TE	98	Dave Greenwood	Jr
WR	29	Ray Hardee	Fr
QB	8	Buddy Hardeman	So
WR		Stan Hixon
RB	36	Klarence Isler	So
C	53	Jeff Jones	Sr
QB	12	Tom Mason	Sr
RB		Ed Morton
TE	88	Guy Preston	Jr
TE	89	Glover Rogers	Jr
WR	80	Clive Sands	Jr
WR	27	Forry Smith	Sr
RB	28	John Solomon	So
G	55	Rob Stoffel	Jr
QB	10	Mike Tryon	So
RB	20	Mike Williams	Jr
FB	34	Jim Wingender	Sr
OT	70	Randy Young	Sr

Defense

Pos.	#	Name	Class
DB	38	Sy Bassett	Sr
LB	86	Mark Benda	So
MG	69	Dave Cheesebrough	So
S	7	Kevin Hart	So
CB	14	Tony Hawkins	Jr
CB	17	Jerry Jaksich	Jr
DE	95	Ray King	Sr
S	31	Bill Larkin	So
DL	41	Mike Larson	So
LB	46	Mark Luhr	So
DL	61	Ron McFarland	Jr
DE	25	Joe Palmisano	Sr
LB	51	Greg Pittman	Sr
DL	64	Tom Randall	So
DB	44	Jim Randolph	So
DE	82	Otis Rodgers	Jr
DT	63	Mike Sternsrud	So
CB	3	Joe Valasa	Jr

Special teams

Pos.	#	Name	Class
K	5	Scott Kollman	So

Head coach

- Earle Bruce

Coordinators/assistant coaches

Legend

- (C) Team captain
- (S) Suspended
- (I) Ineligible
- Injured
- Redshirt
