= 1975 Colorado Buffaloes football team =

American college football season

1975 Colorado Buffaloes football

Astro-Bluebonnet Bowl, L 21–38 vs. Texas
- Conference: Big Eight Conference

Ranking
- AP: No. 16
- Record: 9–3 (5–2 Big 8)
- Head coach: Bill Mallory (2nd season)
- Offensive coordinator: George Belu (2nd season)
- Offensive scheme: I formation
- Defensive coordinator: Bob Reublin (2nd season)
- Base defense: 5–2
- MVP: Dave Williams
- Captains: Pete Brock; Mike McCoy; Bob Simpson; Dave Williams
- Home stadium: Folsom Field

1975 Big Eight Conference football standings
	Conf.					Overall
Team	W		L		T	W		L		T
No. 1 Oklahoma +	6	–	1	–	0	11	–	1	–	0
No. 9 Nebraska +	6	–	1	–	0	10	–	2	–	0
No. 16 Colorado	5	–	2	–	0	9	–	3	–	0
Kansas	4	–	3	–	0	7	–	5	–	0
Missouri	3	–	4	–	0	6	–	5	–	0
Oklahoma State	3	–	4	–	0	7	–	4	–	0
Iowa State	1	–	6	–	0	4	–	7	–	0
Kansas State	0	–	7	–	0	3	–	8	–	0
+ – Conference co-champions; Rankings from AP Poll

The 1975 Colorado Buffaloes football team was an American football team that represented the University of Colorado in the Big Eight Conference (Big 8) during the 1975 NCAA Division I football season. Led by second-year head coach Bill Mallory, the Buffaloes compiled a 9–2 regular season record (5–2 in Big 8, third), and played home games on campus at Folsom Field in Boulder, Colorado.

In the Astro-Bluebonnet Bowl, Colorado fell to ninth-ranked Texas to finish at 9–3. Ranked sixteenth in the final AP poll, the Buffaloes outscored their opponents 331 to 251.

== Schedule ==
Date	Opponent	Rank	Site	TV	Result	Attendance	Source
September 13	California*		Folsom Field; Boulder, CO		W 34–27	46,211	
September 20	Wyoming*		Folsom Field; Boulder, CO		W 27–10	46,032	
September 27	Wichita State*		Folsom Field; Boulder, CO		W 52–0	46,613	
October 4	at No. 1 Oklahoma	No. 19	Oklahoma Memorial Stadium; Norman, OK		L 20–21	70,286	
October 10	at Miami (FL)*	No. 13	Miami Orange Bowl; Miami, FL		W 23–10	18,901	
October 18	No. 10 Missouri^{†}	No. 12	Folsom Field; Boulder, CO		W 31–20	50,239	
October 25	at No. 4 Nebraska	No. 10	Memorial Stadium; Lincoln, NE (rivalry)		L 21–63	76,509	
November 1	at Iowa State	No. 16	Cyclone Stadium; Ames, IA		W 28–27	42,500	
November 8	Oklahoma State	No. 14	Folsom Field; Boulder, CO		W 17–7	47,579	
November 15	at No. 17 Kansas	No. 10	Memorial Stadium; Lawrence, KS	ABC	W 24–21	40,120	
November 22	Kansas State	No. 9	Folsom Field; Boulder, CO (rivalry)		W 33–7	44,345	
December 27	vs. No. 9 Texas*	No. 10	Houston Astrodome; Houston, TX (Astro-Bluebonnet Bowl)	ABC	L 21–38	52,728	
*Non-conference game; ^{†}Homecoming; Rankings from AP Poll released prior to the game

== Personnel ==
1975 Colorado Buffaloes football team roster
Players
Coaches
Offense

Pos.	#	Name	Class
QB	14	Jeff Austin	Jr
C	54	Pete Brock	Sr
WR	41	Steve Gaunty	Fr
OL		Steve Hakes
TE	89	Don Hasselbeck	Jr
RB		Melvin Johnson
RB		Jim Kelleher
OT	70	Mark Koncar	Sr
RB		Paul Krause
RB	30	Terry Kunz	Sr
WR	88	Dave Logan	Sr
WR		Larry Mauler
RB	39	James Mayberry	Fr
RB	40	Emery Moorehead	Jr
RB	19	Tony Reed	Jr
OL		Steve Stripling
RB	38	Billy Waddy	Jr
OL		Leon White
QB	12	David Williams	Sr
OT	74	Steve Young	Sr

Defense

Pos.	#	Name	Class
DT	91	Troy Archer	Sr
LB	49	Brian Cabral	So
LB	32	Gary Campbell	Sr
S	36	Mike L. Davis	Jr
DL		Charlie Johnson
DB		Chuck McCarter
S	26	Mike McCoy	Sr
DL		Frank Patrick
DL	86	Whitney Paul	Sr
LB		Tom Perry
DL		Dave Rice
LB	55	Bart Roth	Jr
DL		Bob Simpson
DB	47	Mike Spivey	Jr
DB		Tom Tesone
DL		Jackie Thornton

Special teams

Pos.	#	Name	Class
P		Stan Koleski
K	28	Tom Mackenzie	Sr

Head coach

- Bill Mallory

Coordinators/assistant coaches

Legend

- (C) Team captain
- (S) Suspended
- (I) Ineligible
- Injured
- Redshirt

Roster
