= Dave Williams (running back) =

American football player (born 1954)

No. 30, 22
- Position: Running back

Personal information
- Born: March 10, 1954 (age 72); Minden, Louisiana, U.S.
- Listed height: 6 ft 2 in (1.88 m)
- Listed weight: 210 lb (95 kg)

Career information
- High school: Homer (Homer, Louisiana)
- College: Colorado
- NFL draft: 1976: 7th round, 208th overall pick

Career history
- Dallas Cowboys (1976)*; Calgary Stampeders (1976); San Francisco 49ers (1977–1978); Chicago Bears (1979–1981)
- * Offseason or practice squad member only

Awards and highlights
- Second-team All-Big Eight (1975)

Career NFL statistics
- Rushing attempts: 172
- Rushing yards: 501
- Receptions: 92
- Receiving yards: 675
- Total TDs: 11
- Stats at Pro Football Reference

David Ray Williams (born March 10, 1954) is an American former professional football player who was a running back in the National Football League (NFL) for the San Francisco 49ers and Chicago Bears. He also played for the Calgary Stampeders of the Canadian Football League (CFL), and played college football at the Colorado Buffaloes.

== Early life ==
Williams attended Homer High School in Louisiana. He attended Grambling State University before accepting a scholarship from the University of Colorado at Boulder, where he played quarterback for the Buffaloes, and was also a sprinter on the track team.

As a junior in 1974, he made 73 completions out of 139 attempts (52.5%) for 899 yards and 3 touchdowns, while rushing for 190 yards and 4 touchdowns. In his last year, he had 103 completions out of 172 attempts (59.9%) for 1,282 yards and 7 touchdowns, while rushing for 572 yards and 7 touchdowns. He finished his career as CU's total offense record holder with 3,576 yards.

== Professional career ==
=== Dallas Cowboys ===
Williams was selected by the Dallas Cowboys in the seventh round (208th overall) of the 1976 NFL draft as an athlete, with the intention of playing him at running back, but he opted not to sign with the team.

=== Calgary Stampeders ===
On May 19, 1976, he was signed by the Calgary Stampeders of the Canadian Football League to play quarterback.

=== San Francisco 49ers ===
In 1977, Williams was signed by the San Francisco 49ers as a free agent. That season, he was a backup running back (alongside O.J. Simpson), but also returned one kickoff for a touchdown. The next year, he was used mostly on special teams as a kickoff returner, then was released by new head coach Bill Walsh on August 20, 1979.

=== Chicago Bears ===
Nine days later on August 29, Williams was signed as a free agent by the Chicago Bears. He started twelve games at fullback after Roland Harper was lost for the year with a knee injury, while blocking for Walter Payton and registering 755 all-purpose yards. The next year, he returned to a backup and special teams role.

The biggest highlight of Williams' NFL career came on Thanksgiving Day 1980 against the Detroit Lions, when he returned the opening overtime kickoff 95 yards for the game-winning touchdown, completing a comeback from a 17–3 fourth-quarter deficit. At the time, it was the shortest overtime in NFL history. In November 1981, he was placed on the injured reserve list with a fractured leg.

== Personal life ==
His nephews Brock Williams and John Williams also played in the National Football League.
