= 1975 Louisiana Tech Bulldogs football team =

American college football season

1975 Louisiana Tech Bulldogs football
- Conference: Southland Conference
- Record: 8–2 (4–1 Southland)
- Head coach: Maxie Lambright (9th season)
- Captains: Rod Bagley; Dan Core; Jerry Davis
- Home stadium: Joe Aillet Stadium

1975 Southland Conference football standings
	Conf.					Overall
Team	W		L		T	W		L		T
Arkansas State $	5	–	0	–	0	11	–	0	–	0
Louisiana Tech	4	–	1	–	1	8	–	2	–	0
McNeese State	3	–	2	–	0	7	–	4	–	0
Southwestern Louisiana	2	–	3	–	0	6	–	5	–	0
UT Arlington	1	–	4	–	0	4	–	7	–	0
Lamar	0	–	5	–	0	1	–	10	–	0
$ – Conference champion

The 1975 Louisiana Tech Bulldogs football team was an American football team that represented Louisiana Tech University as a member of the Southland Conference during the 1975 NCAA Division I football season. In their ninth year under head coach Maxie Lambright, the team compiled an 8–2 record.

== Schedule ==
Date	Opponent	Site	Result	Attendance	Source
September 13	at McNeese State	Cowboy Stadium; Lake Charles, LA	W 21–14	20,000	
September 27	UT Arlington	Joe Aillet Stadium; Ruston, LA	W 37–8	17,600	
October 4	at Lamar	Cardinal Stadium; Beaumont, TX	W 24–10	11,109	
October 11	Southwestern Louisiana	Joe Aillet Stadium; Ruston, LA (rivalry)	W 24–14	16,200	
October 18	vs. Northwestern State*	State Fair Stadium; Shreveport, LA (rivalry)	W 41–14	26,496	
October 25	Southern Miss*	Joe Aillet Stadium; Ruston, LA (rivalry)	L 14–24	8,300	
November 1	at Southeastern Louisiana*	Strawberry Stadium; Hammond, LA	W 33–28	7,300	
November 8	Northeast Louisiana*	Joe Aillet Stadium; Ruston, LA (rivalry)	W 41–23	16,800	
November 15	Chattanooga*	Joe Aillet Stadium; Ruston, LA	W 49–20	13,200	
November 22	Arkansas State	Joe Aillet Stadium; Ruston, LA	L 13–30	20,100	
*Non-conference game
