= 1975 UT Arlington Mavericks football team =

American college football season

1975 UT Arlington Mavericks football
- Conference: Southland Conference
- Record: 4–7 (1–4 Southland)
- Head coach: Harold Elliott (2nd season)
- Home stadium: Arlington Stadium

1975 Southland Conference football standings
	Conf.					Overall
Team	W		L		T	W		L		T
Arkansas State $	5	–	0	–	0	11	–	0	–	0
Louisiana Tech	4	–	1	–	1	8	–	2	–	0
McNeese State	3	–	2	–	0	7	–	4	–	0
Southwestern Louisiana	2	–	3	–	0	6	–	5	–	0
UT Arlington	1	–	4	–	0	4	–	7	–	0
Lamar	0	–	5	–	0	1	–	10	–	0
$ – Conference champion

The 1975 UT Arlington Mavericks football team was an American football team that represented the University of Texas at Arlington in the Southland Conference during the 1975 NCAA Division I football season. In their second year under head coach Harold Elliott, the team compiled a 4–7 record.

== Schedule ==
Date	Opponent	Site	Result	Attendance	Source
September 6	vs. North Texas State*	Texas Stadium; Irving, TX	L 14–27	5,000	
September 13	at TCU*	Amon G. Carter Stadium; Fort Worth, TX	W 24–7	17,442	
September 27	at Louisiana Tech	Joe Aillet Stadium; Ruston, LA	L 8–37	17,600	
October 4	at West Texas State*	Kimbrough Memorial Stadium; Canyon, TX	W 39–7	11,000	
October 11	McNeese State	Arlington Stadium; Arlington, TX	L 24–28	4,500	
October 18	Southern Miss*	Arlington Stadium; Arlington, TX	L 7–34	4,740	
October 25	at New Mexico State*	Memorial Stadium; Las Cruces, NM	L 0–16	12,626	
November 1	at Southwestern Louisiana	Cajun Field; Lafayette, LA	L 32–35	25,280	
November 8	Lamar	Arlington Stadium; Arlington, TX	W 37–24	6,300	
November 15	at Arkansas State	Indian Stadium; Jonesboro, AR	L 7–54	10,243	
November 22	Bowling Green*	Arlington Stadium; Arlington, TX	W 21–17	11,000	
*Non-conference game
