= 1975 Kansas State Wildcats football team =

American college football season

1975 Kansas State Wildcats football
- Conference: Big Eight Conference
- Record: 3–8 (0–7 Big 8)
- Head coach: Ellis Rainsberger (1st season)
- Offensive coordinator: Joe Pendry (1st season)
- Defensive coordinator: Dick Selcer (1st season)
- Home stadium: KSU Stadium

1975 Big Eight Conference football standings
	Conf.					Overall
Team	W		L		T	W		L		T
No. 1 Oklahoma +	6	–	1	–	0	11	–	1	–	0
No. 9 Nebraska +	6	–	1	–	0	10	–	2	–	0
No. 16 Colorado	5	–	2	–	0	9	–	3	–	0
Kansas	4	–	3	–	0	7	–	5	–	0
Missouri	3	–	4	–	0	6	–	5	–	0
Oklahoma State	3	–	4	–	0	7	–	4	–	0
Iowa State	1	–	6	–	0	4	–	7	–	0
Kansas State	0	–	7	–	0	3	–	8	–	0
+ – Conference co-champions; Rankings from AP Poll

The 1975 Kansas State Wildcats football team represented Kansas State University in the 1975 NCAA Division I football season. The team's head football coach was Ellis Rainsberger, in his first of three years at the helm of the Wildcats. The Wildcats played their home games in KSU Stadium. 1975 saw the wildcats finish with a record of 3–8, and a dismal 0–7 record in Big Eight Conference play.

1975 was the first time in school history that the Wildcats were shut out three times in one season; the other time was in 1980. The Wildcats were shut out by Texas A&M, Kansas, Nebraska. They scored just 23 points in 7 conference games, an average of just 3.26 points per game.

== Schedule ==
Date	Opponent	Site	Result	Attendance	Source
September 13	at Tulsa*	Skelly Stadium; Tulsa, OK	W 17–16	34,000	
September 20	Wichita State*	KSU Stadium; Manhattan, KS	W 32–0	31,000	
September 27	at Wake Forest*	Groves Stadium; Winston-Salem, NC	W 17–16	17,700	
October 4	No. 6 Texas A&M*	KSU Stadium; Manhattan, KS	L 0–10	37,100	
October 11	Iowa State	KSU Stadium; Manhattan, KS (rivalry)	L 7–17	23,600	
October 18	No. 2 Oklahoma^{†}	KSU Stadium; Manhattan, KS	L 3–25	34,700	
October 25	at No. 15 Missouri	Faurot Field; Columbia, MO	L 3–35	62,860	
November 1	at Kansas	Memorial Stadium; Lawrence, KS (rivalry)	L 0–28	53,480	
November 8	No. 3 Nebraska	KSU Stadium; Manhattan, KS (rivalry)	L 0–12	41,300	
November 15	at Oklahoma State	Lewis Field; Stillwater, OK	L 3–56	40,100	
November 22	at No. 9 Colorado	Folsom Field; Boulder, CO (rivalry)	L 7–33	44,345	
*Non-conference game; ^{†}Homecoming; Rankings from AP Poll released prior to the game

== Roster ==
1975 Kansas State Wildcats football team roster
Players
Coaches
Offense

Pos.	#	Name	Class
TE	81	Paul Coffman	So

Defense

Pos.	#	Name	Class
DE	79	Mike Osborn	So
LB	59	Gary Spani	So
DB	32	Marvin Switzer	Jr

Special teams

Pos.	#	Name	Class

Head coach

- Ellis Rainsberger

Coordinators/assistant coaches

Legend

- (C) Team captain
- (S) Suspended
- (I) Ineligible
- Injured
- Redshirt
