= 1975 McNeese State Cowboys football team =

American college football season

1975 McNeese State Cowboys football
- Conference: Southland Conference
- Record: 7–4 (3–2 Southland)
- Head coach: Jack Doland (6th season)
- Home stadium: Cowboy Stadium

1975 Southland Conference football standings
	Conf.					Overall
Team	W		L		T	W		L		T
Arkansas State $	5	–	0	–	0	11	–	0	–	0
Louisiana Tech	4	–	1	–	1	8	–	2	–	0
McNeese State	3	–	2	–	0	7	–	4	–	0
Southwestern Louisiana	2	–	3	–	0	6	–	5	–	0
UT Arlington	1	–	4	–	0	4	–	7	–	0
Lamar	0	–	5	–	0	1	–	10	–	0
$ – Conference champion

The 1975 McNeese State Cowboys football team represented McNeese State University as a member of the Southland Conference in the 1975 NCAA Division I football season. Led by sixth-year head coach Jack Doland, the Cowboys compiled an overall record of 7–4 with a mark of 3–2 in conference play, placing third in the Southland. McNeese State played home games at Cowboy Stadium in Lake Charles, Louisiana.

The team's statistical leaders included Johnnie Thibodeaux with 1,071 passing yards, Gary Broussard with 314 receiving yards, and Mike McArthur with 787 rushing yards.

== Schedule ==
Date	Opponent	Site	Result	Attendance	Source
September 13	Louisiana Tech	Cowboy Stadium; Lake Charles, LA	L 14–21	20,000	
September 20	Arkansas State	Cowboy Stadium; Lake Charles, LA	L 7–24		
September 27	at Eastern Michigan*	Rynearson Stadium; Ypsilanti, MI	L 6–20	11,035	
October 4	at Marshall*	Fairfield Stadium; Huntington, WV	W 33–3	9,156	
October 11	at UT Arlington	Arlington Stadium; Arlington, TX	W 28–24	4,500	
October 18	Northeast Louisiana*	Cowboy Stadium; Lake Charles, LA	W 15–14	10,000	
October 25	Dayton*	Cowboy Stadium; Lake Charles, LA	L 12–17	5,000	
November 8	Northwestern State*	Cowboy Stadium; Lake Charles, LA (rivalry)	W 31–14	12,000	
November 15	West Texas State*	Cowboy Stadium; Lake Charles, LA	W 39–33		
November 22	at Southwestern Louisiana	Cajun Field; Lafayette, LA (rivalry)	W 31–21		
November 29	Lamar	Cowboy Stadium; Lake Charles, LA (rivalry)	W 20–10		
*Non-conference game

== Roster ==
1975 McNeese State Cowboys football team roster
Players			Coaches
Offense: Pos. / # / Name / Class; QB / 14 / Johnnie Thibodeaux / Sr	Defense: Pos. / # / Name / Class; DB / / Charles Jefferson	Special teams: Pos. / # / Name / Class	Head coach: Jack Doland; Coordinators/assistant coaches Legend: (C) Team captain; (S) Suspended; (I) Ineligible; Injured; Redshirt
