= 1975 Arkansas State Indians football team =

American college football season

1975 Arkansas State Indians football

Southland champion
- Conference: Southland Conference
- Record: 11–0 (5–0 Southland)
- Head coach: Bill Davidson (5th season)
- Home stadium: Indian Stadium; War Memorial Stadium

1975 Southland Conference football standings
	Conf.					Overall
Team	W		L		T	W		L		T
Arkansas State $	5	–	0	–	0	11	–	0	–	0
Louisiana Tech	4	–	1	–	1	8	–	2	–	0
McNeese State	3	–	2	–	0	7	–	4	–	0
Southwestern Louisiana	2	–	3	–	0	6	–	5	–	0
UT Arlington	1	–	4	–	0	4	–	7	–	0
Lamar	0	–	5	–	0	1	–	10	–	0
$ – Conference champion

The 1975 Arkansas State Indians football team represented Arkansas State University as a member of the Southland Conference during the 1975 NCAA Division I football season. Led by fifth-year head coach Bill Davidson, the Indians compiled an overall record of 11–0 with a mark of 5–0 in conference play, winning the Southland title.

== Schedule ==
Date	Opponent	Site	Result	Attendance	Source
September 6	Northwestern State*	Indian Stadium; Jonesboro, AR	W 42–0	13,513	
September 13	Idaho*	Indian Stadium; Jonesboro, AR	W 23–6	10,122	
September 20	at McNeese State	Cowboy Stadium; Lake Charles, LA	W 24–7		
September 27	at Memphis State*	Memphis Memorial Stadium; Memphis, TN (rivalry)	W 29–10	27,669	
October 4	Southwestern Louisiana	Indian Stadium; Jonesboro, AR	W 39–17		
October 18	at Cincinnati*	Nippert Stadium; Cincinnati, OH	W 14–9	6,556	
October 25	at Lamar	Cardinal Stadium; Beaumont, TX	W 17–0	500	
November 1	Chattanooga*^{†}	Indian Stadium; Jonesboro, AR	W 48–0	14,621	
November 8	Southern Illinois*	War Memorial Stadium; Little Rock, AR	W 35–12	19,231	
November 15	UT Arlington	Indian Stadium; Jonesboro, AR	W 54–7	10,243	
November 22	at Louisiana Tech	Joe Aillet Stadium; Ruston, LA	W 30–13	20,100	
*Non-conference game; ^{†}Homecoming
