= 1975 New Mexico State Aggies football team =

American college football season

1975 New Mexico State Aggies football
- Conference: Missouri Valley Conference
- Record: 5–6 (2–2 MVC)
- Head coach: Jim Bradley (3rd season)
- Home stadium: Memorial Stadium

1975 Missouri Valley Conference football standings
| | Conf. | | | | | Overall |
| Team | W | | L | | T | W | | L | | T |
|---|---|---|---|---|---|---|---|---|---|---|
| Tulsa $ | 4 | – | 0 | – | 0 | 7 | – | 4 | – | 0 |
| New Mexico State | 2 | – | 2 | – | 0 | 5 | – | 6 | – | 0 |
| West Texas State | 2 | – | 2 | – | 0 | 5 | – | 6 | – | 0 |
| Drake | 1 | – | 3 | – | 0 | 3 | – | 8 | – | 0 |
| Wichita State | 1 | – | 3 | – | 0 | 3 | – | 8 | – | 0 |
$ – Conference champion

The 1975 New Mexico State Aggies football team was an American football team that represented New Mexico State University in the Missouri Valley Conference during the 1975 NCAA Division I football season. In their third year under head coach Jim Bradley, the Aggies compiled a 5–6 record. The team played home games at Memorial Stadium in Las Cruces, New Mexico.

== Schedule ==
| Date | Opponent | Site | Result | Attendance | Source |
|---|---|---|---|---|---|
| September 6 | Drake | Memorial Stadium; Las Cruces, NM | W 14–10 | | |
| September 13 | at UTEP* | Sun Bowl; El Paso, TX (rivalry) | W 31–24 | 16,550 | |
| September 20 | at Lamar* | Cardinal Stadium; Beaumont, TX | W 17–14 | 10,024 | |
| September 27 | at Southwestern Louisiana* | Cajun Field; Lafayette, LA | L 7–31 | 24,200 | |
| October 4 | Tulsa | Memorial Stadium; Las Cruces, NM | L 7–35 | 11,026 | |
| October 11 | at Wichita State | Cessna Stadium; Wichita, KS | W 26–24 | 10,643 | |
| October 18 | at San Diego State* | San Diego Stadium; San Diego, CA | L 3–48 | 45,022 | |
| October 25 | UT Arlington* | Memorial Stadium; Las Cruces, NM | W 16–0 | | |
| November 8 | at West Texas State | Kimbrough Memorial Stadium; Canyon, TX | L 10–38 | 8,600 | |
| November 15 | North Texas State | Memorial Stadium; Las Cruces, NM | L 20–24 | 5,833 | |
| November 22 | New Mexico* | Memorial Stadium; Las Cruces, NM (rivalry) | L 28–52 | 11,216 | |
*Non-conference game
