= 1975 Astro-Bluebonnet Bowl =

Colorado Buffaloes	Texas Longhorns
(9–2)	(9–2)
21	38
Head coach: Bill Mallory	Head coach: Darrell Royal
AP / Coaches; 10 / 10	AP / Coaches; 9 / 9
	1	2	3	4	Total
Colorado	7	14	0	0	21
Texas	0	7	24	7	38
- Date: December 27, 1975
- Season: 1975
- Stadium: Astrodome
- Location: Houston, Texas
- Attendance: 52,748

United States TV coverage
- Network: ABC

The 1975 Astro-Bluebonnet Bowl was a college football postseason bowl game that featured the Texas Longhorns and the Colorado Buffaloes.

== Background ==
A loss to #2 Texas A&M in the final game of the season meant that Texas could not claim an outright Southwest Conference title. Colorado had finished 3rd in the Big Eight Conference. This was Colorado's first bowl game under Mallory, but their fourth overall bowl appearance of the decade, and their first Bluebonnet Bowl since 1971. This was the 8th straight bowl appearance for Texas and its first Bluebonnet Bowl appearance since 1966.

== Game summary ==
- Colorado – Kunz 1 run (MacKenzie kick) 7–0 2:29 1Q
- Colorado – Logan 4 pass from Williams (MacKenzie kick) 14–0 12:42 2Q
- Texas – Jackson 21 pass from Marty Akins (Erxleben kick) 14–7 1:47 2Q
- Colorado – Hasselbeck 25 pass from Williams (MacKenzie kick) 21–7 0:24 2Q
- Texas – Walker 3 run from Akins pitch(kick blocked) 21–13 10:56 3Q
- Texas – T. Campbell 25 blocked punt return (E. Campbell pass from Marty Akins) 21–21 8:37 3Q
- Texas – Erxleben 55 FG 21–24 6:25 3Q
- Texas – Jones 4 run from Akins pitch (Erxleben kick) 21–31 3:15 3Q
- Texas – Jones 7 run from Akins pitch (Erxleben kick) 21–38 5:05 4Q

== Aftermath ==
Royal retired the following season after posting a 5-5-1 record, but remained as the athletic director until 1980. Colorado went to the Orange Bowl that season, but lost. They did not win a bowl game until January 1991. Texas returned to the Bluebonnet Bowl three times, and Colorado returned once. The Longhorns defeated Pitt 32=27 in the last Bluebonnet Bowl in 1987.

Texas and Colorado became conference rivals with the formation of the Big 12 in 1996. They were together in the Big 12 until the Buffaloes departed for the Pac-12 in 2011.

== Statistics ==
Statistics	Colorado	Texas
First downs	21	15
Third Downs	8–14	3–10
Fourth Downs	2–2	1–1
Rushing yards	117	171
Passing yards	177	66
Passes (Comp-Attem-Int)	17–26–3	4–5–0
Total offense	294	237
Return yards	-2	61
Punts–average	4–24.0	2–40.0
Fumbles–lost	3–2	2–2
Penalties–yards	6–50	5–35
Quarterback Sacks—Yards	0–0	3–39
Time of possession	34:56	25:04
