= 1975 Wichita State Shockers football team =

American college football season

1975 Wichita State Shockers football
- Conference: Missouri Valley Conference
- Record: 3–8 (1–3 MVC)
- Head coach: Jim Wright (2nd season)
- Home stadium: Cessna Stadium

1975 Missouri Valley Conference football standings
	Conf.					Overall
Team	W		L		T	W		L		T
Tulsa $	4	–	0	–	0	7	–	4	–	0
New Mexico State	2	–	2	–	0	5	–	6	–	0
West Texas State	2	–	2	–	0	5	–	6	–	0
Drake	1	–	3	–	0	3	–	8	–	0
Wichita State	1	–	3	–	0	3	–	8	–	0
$ – Conference champion

The 1975 Wichita State Shockers football team was an American football team that represented Wichita State as a member of the Missouri Valley Conference (MVC) during the 1975 NCAA Division I football season. In their second year under head coach Jim Wright, the team compiled an overall record of 3–8 with a mark of 1–3 in conference play, tying for fourth place in the MVC.

== Schedule ==
Date	Opponent	Site	Result	Attendance	Source
September 6	West Texas State	Cessna Stadium; Wichita, KS	W 13–7	20,175	
September 13	at Oklahoma State*	Lewis Field; Stillwater, OK	L 0–34	28,800	
September 20	at Kansas State*	KSU Stadium; Manhattan, KS	L 0–32	31,000	
September 27	at Colorado*	Folsom Field; Boulder, CO	L 0–52	46,613	
October 4	Louisville*	Cessna Stadium; Wichita, KS	W 13–10		
October 11	New Mexico State	Cessna Stadium; Wichita, KS	L 24–26	10,643	
October 18	Tulsa	Cessna Stadium; Wichita, KS	L 10–41	13,278	
October 25	at Southern Illinois*	McAndrew Stadium; Carbondale, IL	L 22–33	11,122	
November 1	Memphis State*	Cessna Stadium; Wichita, KS	L 7–13	8,854	
November 8	Fresno State*	Cessna Stadium; Wichita, KS	W 28–11	8,640	
November 15	at Drake	Drake Stadium; Des Moines, IA	L 23–27	6,125	
*Non-conference game
