= 1975 Oklahoma Sooners football team =

American college football season

1975 Oklahoma Sooners football
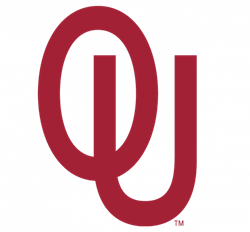

Consensus national champion Big 8 co-champion Orange Bowl champion

Orange Bowl, W 14–6 vs. Michigan
- Conference: Big Eight Conference

Ranking
- Coaches: No. 1
- AP: No. 1
- Record: 11–1 (6–1 Big 8)
- Head coach: Barry Switzer (3rd season)
- Offensive coordinator: Galen Hall (3rd season)
- Offensive scheme: Wishbone
- Defensive coordinator: Larry Lacewell (6th season)
- Base defense: 5–2
- Captains: Steve Davis; Dewey Selmon; Lee Roy Selmon; Joe Washington
- Home stadium: Oklahoma Memorial Stadium

1975 Big Eight Conference football standings
	Conf.					Overall
Team	W		L		T	W		L		T
No. 1 Oklahoma +	6	–	1	–	0	11	–	1	–	0
No. 9 Nebraska +	6	–	1	–	0	10	–	2	–	0
No. 16 Colorado	5	–	2	–	0	9	–	3	–	0
Kansas	4	–	3	–	0	7	–	5	–	0
Missouri	3	–	4	–	0	6	–	5	–	0
Oklahoma State	3	–	4	–	0	7	–	4	–	0
Iowa State	1	–	6	–	0	4	–	7	–	0
Kansas State	0	–	7	–	0	3	–	8	–	0
+ – Conference co-champions; Rankings from AP Poll

The 1975 Oklahoma Sooners football team represented the University of Oklahoma in the 1975 NCAA Division I football season. The team was helmed by Barry Switzer in his third season as head coach. After sailing through their first eight games, Oklahoma suffered a surprising home loss to Kansas, which snapped a 28-game winning streak. With only two regular season games and a bowl trip left, any hopes for a repeat national championship looked slim.

OU defeated Missouri, 28–27, in Columbia before coming home to defeat second-ranked Nebraska, 35–10 to take the Big 8 Conference title. With the conference title in tow, the No. 3-ranked Sooners, in their first bowl game under Switzer, headed to the Orange Bowl to meet Michigan.

Prior to the Orange Bowl, the Sooners moved from #3 to #2 in the polls when previous No. 2 Texas A&M was routed 31-6 in its regular season finale by Southwest Conference rival Arkansas at Little Rock Dec. 6.

OU prevailed in that game with a 14–6 victory and was pushed to the top spot in the polls when #1 Ohio State fell 23-10 to UCLA in the Rose Bowl (the Buckeyes defeated the Bruins 41-20 at Los Angeles during the regular season).

Oklahoma won its 27th conference and fifth national championship.

The Sooners served their third season of NCAA probation in 1975. They were banned from appearing on television during the regular season, but the portion of the probation banning them from bowl games was lifted (Oklahoma did not play in a bowl game in 1973, but appeared twice on television; it was banned from both television and bowl games in 1974). Oklahoma returned to television for the Orange Bowl.

== Schedule ==
Date	Opponent	Rank	Site	TV	Result	Attendance	Source
September 13	Oregon*	No. 1	Oklahoma Memorial Stadium; Norman, OK		W 62–7	70,213	
September 20	No. 15 Pittsburgh*	No. 1	Oklahoma Memorial Stadium; Norman, OK		W 46–10	70,286	
September 26	at Miami (FL)*	No. 1	Miami Orange Bowl; Miami, FL		W 20–17	37,203	
October 4	No. 19 Colorado	No. 1	Oklahoma Memorial Stadium; Norman, OK		W 21–20	70,286	
October 11	vs. No. 5 Texas*	No. 2	Cotton Bowl; Dallas, TX (Red River Shootout)		W 24–17	72,032	
October 18	at Kansas State	No. 2	KSU Stadium; Manhattan, KS		W 25–3	34,700	
October 25	Iowa State	No. 2	Oklahoma Memorial Stadium; Norman, OK		W 39–7	72,086	
November 1	at No. 19 Oklahoma State	No. 1	Lewis Field; Stillwater, OK (Bedlam Series)		W 27–7	51,220	
November 8	Kansas	No. 2	Oklahoma Memorial Stadium; Norman, OK		L 3–23	70,286	
November 15	at No. 18 Missouri	No. 6	Faurot Field; Columbia, MO (rivalry)		W 28–27	69,377	
November 22	No. 2 Nebraska	No. 7	Oklahoma Memorial Stadium; Norman, OK (rivalry)		W 35–10	70.286	
January 1, 1976	vs. No. 5 Michigan*	No. 3	Miami Orange Bowl; Miami, FL (Orange Bowl)	NBC	W 14–6	76,799	
*Non-conference game; Rankings from AP Poll released prior to the game

== Rankings ==
Ranking movements Legend: ██ Increase in ranking ██ Decrease in ranking ( ) = First-place votes
	Week														
Poll	Pre	1	2	3	4	5	6	7	8	9	10	11	12	13	Final
AP	1 (54)	1 (51)	1 (53)	1 (56)	1 (30)	2 (14)	2 (12)	2 (8)	2 (8)	2 (19)	6	7	3 (2)	3 (1)	1 (54.5)
Coaches															

== Game summaries ==
Oklahoma had won the AP National Title in 1974 and began the year by thrashing Oregon 62–7 in Norman. OU played host to a Johnny Majors coached #15 Pittsburgh squad, sporting junior running back sensation Tony Dorsett (only a year away from the Heisman Trophy and the collegiate rushing record), and they dominated, outscoring the Panthers 46–10. But a trip to unranked Miami was nearly fatal. The Sooners scored all 20 of their points in the second quarter and finished with just 163 rushing yards and 176 total, barely surviving a ten-point Hurricanes' fourth quarter en route to a 20–17 victory. That win was not enough to knock the Sooners to the second spot in the polls, but a one-point win over Colorado the following week was. Against the Buffaloes, the vaunted Sooner wishbone offense looked abysmal, and they surrendered a 14-point lead in the second half. A botched CU extra point in the final 79 seconds proved the difference. Ohio State took over the number one ranking. The Sooners, despite the close calls, came into Dallas atop a 24-game winning streak and a 33-game unbeaten streak and ranked #2 in the country.

=== Oregon ===
Team	1	2	3	4	Total
Oregon	7	0	0	0	7
• Oklahoma	10	33	7	12	62

- Date: September 13
- Location: Oklahoma Memorial Stadium
- Game attendance: 70,213

=== Pittsburgh ===
Team	1	2	3	4	Total
Pittsburgh	0	0	3	7	10
• Oklahoma	7	16	7	16	46

- Date: September 20
- Location: Oklahoma Memorial Stadium

=== Miami (FL) ===
Team	1	2	3	4	Total
• Oklahoma	0	20	0	0	20
Miami (FL)	7	0	0	10	17

- Date: September 26
- Location: Orange Bowl
- Game attendance: 39,020

=== Colorado ===
#19 Colorado Buffaloes (3–0) at #1 Oklahoma Sooners (3–0)

Quarter	1	2	3	4	Total
Colorado	0	7	7	6	20
Oklahoma	7	7	7	0	21

at Oklahoma Memorial Stadium, Norman, Oklahoma

- Date: October 4
- Game attendance: 71,118

Game information
First quarter
- OU – Joe Washington 11-yard run (Tony DiRienzo kick). Oklahoma 7–0.

Second quarter

- OU – Joe Washington 74-yard punt return (Tony DiRienzo kick). Oklahoma 14–0.
- CU – Billy Waddy 3-yard run (Tom Mackenzie kick). Oklahoma 14–7.

Third quarter

- CU – David Williams 1-yard run (Tom Mackenzie kick). Tie 14–14.
- OU – Elvis Peacock 2-yard run (Tony DiRienzo kick). Oklahoma 21–14.

'Fourth quarter

- CU – Billy Waddy 8-yard pass from David Williams (kick failed), 1:23. Oklahoma 21–20.

=== Texas ===
#2 Oklahoma vs. #5 Texas

Team	1	2	3	4	Total
• Oklahoma	10	0	7	7	24
#5 Texas	0	7	0	10	17

- Date: October 11
- Location: Cotton Bowl
- Game attendance: 72,032

Scoring summary
Q1	OKLA	DiRienzo 45 yard field goal	OKLA 3-0
Q1	OKLA	Phillips recovered fumble in end zone (DiRienzo kick)	OKLA 10-0
Q1	TEX	Jackson 38 yard pass from Akins (Erxleben kick)	OKLA 10-7
Q3	OKLA	Washington 9 yard run (DiRienzo kick)	OU 17-7
Q4	TEX	Walker 25 yard run (Erxleben kick)	OKLA 17-14
Q4	TEX	Erxleben 43 yard field goal	Tie 17-17
Q4	OKLA	Ivory 33 yard run (DiRienzo kick)	OKLA 24-17

Texas came into Dallas with a star in 225-pound sophomore fullback Earl Campbell. The runner had trampled everything in his path en route to 508 yards (8.1 ypc), including 198 yards against Washington. Behind the young Campbell, the Longhorns were leading the nation in rushing, total offense and scoring, averaging 44 points per game.

The Sooners was led by Steve Davis, an ordained minister that could run and pass. The halfbacks, Joe Washington and Horace Ivory. The receiving corps, paced by Senior Billy Brooks, was famous in the wishbone era at OU. The 1975 OU defense was led by Lee Roy Selmon, who would go on to win both the Outland Trophy and the Lombardi Award as the nation's best lineman.

It was the Sooner defense that made the Longhorns lose a fifth straight Red River Shootout. Neither offense exploded with big plays, both scoring hard fought points in the red zone. The game was best characterized by the hard hitting from both sides, which led to a considerable number of turnovers. The Longhorns fumbled the ball four times and gave away an interception. The Sooners lost two fumbles. The Sooner defense proved its mettle against the powerful Campbell, holding him to 95 yards on 23 carries. Although he was the game's leading ball carrier, he also marked the 21st straight time that a team failed to have a 100-yard rusher against the Sooners. The Sooners prevailed 24–17.

=== Kansas State ===
Team	1	2	3	4	Total
• Oklahoma	14	3	5	3	25
Kansas St	0	3	0	0	3

- Date: October 18
- Location: KSU Stadium
- Game attendance: 33,196

=== Iowa State ===
Iowa State at #2 Oklahoma

Team	1	2	3	4	Total
Iowa St	0	0	7	0	7
• Oklahoma	17	9	7	6	39

- Date: October 25
- Location: Oklahoma Memorial Stadium
- Game attendance: 70,879

Scoring summary
Q1	OKLA	Washington 3 yard run (DiRienzo kick)	OKLA 7-0
Q1	OKLA	Davis 11 yard run (DiRienzio kick)	OKLA 14-0
Q1	OKLA	DiRienzio 31 yard field goal	OKLA 17-0
Q2	OKLA	Safety	OU 19-0
Q2	OKLA	Culbreath 8 yard run (DiRienzio kick)	OKLA 26-0
Q3	OKLA	Washington 6 yard run (DiRienzio kick)	OKLA 33-0
Q3	ISU	Wingender 13 yard run (Length kick)	OKLA 33-7
Q4	OKLA	Sims 17 yard run (pass failed)	OKLA 39-7

=== Oklahoma State ===
Team	1	2	3	4	Total
• Oklahoma	10	0	10	7	27
Oklahoma St	0	0	0	7	7

- Date: November 1
- Location: Lewis Field
- Game attendance: 49,358

=== Kansas ===
Team	1	2	3	4	Total
• Kansas	0	7	9	7	23
Oklahoma	3	0	0	0	3

- Date: November 8
- Location: Oklahoma Memorial Stadium
- Game attendance: 70,922

After thrashing Kansas State, Iowa State, and Oklahoma State by a combined score of 91–17, the Sooners returned home. Inexplicably, a team that had run roughshod over equivalent teams, managed to suffer a 23–3 loss to unranked Kansas, a team that came into Norman with a 5–3 record. The Sooners were caught flat and were upset by the Jayhawks, knocking them from the #2 spot in the polls down to #7. In Columbia against #18 Missouri the following week, they needed a 71-yard touchdown run from Joe Washington on a critical fourth and one, a Washington run for a successful two-point conversion, and two missed field goal attempts by the Tigers in the final two minutes to eke out a 28–27 win. The struggles took their toll, and OU found themselves down another spot in the poll heading into the annual showdown against Nebraska. The defending national champs were reeling and in search of an identity. No game could have had nearly as much on the line as the final regular season game for the Big 8 Championship.

=== Missouri ===
Team	1	2	3	4	Total
• Oklahoma	12	8	0	8	28
Missouri	0	0	7	20	27

- Date: November 15
- Location: Memorial Stadium
- Game attendance: 67,518

=== Nebraska ===
#2 Nebraska at #7 Oklahoma

Team	1	2	3	4	Total
Nebraska	3	0	7	0	10
• Oklahoma	0	7	7	21	35

- Date: November 22
- Location: Oklahoma Memorial Stadium
- Game attendance: 70,286

Scoring summary
Q1	NEB	Coyle 24 yard field goal	NEB 3-0
Q2	OKLA	Davis 1 yard run (DiRienzo kick)	OKLA 7-3
Q3	NEB	Anthony 1 yard run (Coyle kick)	NEB 10-7
Q3	OKLA	Ivory 5 yard run (DiRienzo kick)	OKLA 14-10
Q4	OKLA	Peacock 3 yard run (DiRienzo kick)	OKLA 21-10
Q4	OKLA	Davis 8 yard run (DiRienzo kick)	OKLA 28-10
Q4	OKLA	Sims 4 yard run (DiRienzo kick)	OKLA 35-10

Nebraska began 1975 mostly under the radar, but they were riding a 10–0 record and sporting one of the best passing quarterbacks in the nation in Vince Ferragamo, who had transferred a season before from California. He had completed 66 of 109 passes for 1,007 yards and 12 touchdowns, against only two interceptions. The Huskers had stepped into the #2 spot in the polls that the Sooners had vacated in their loss to Kansas.

The Cornhusker offense was balanced, averaging 265.6 yards rushing and 156.7 yards passing per game, and was among the nation's leaders in scoring, averaging 34.3 points per game. The Nebraska defense was allowing only 8.5 points per game. They had posted four shutouts, including their last two opponents to run their string to ten consecutive scoreless quarters. The Black Shirt D had held the same Jayhawks team that had upset OU earlier in the season to only 177 yards of total offense.

The Big Eight title, as usual, was on the line in 1975. The winner would play in the Orange Bowl with a possible shot at a national championship. Oklahoma, realizing all that was on the line, had worked with Fiesta Bowl officials for a potential bid in Tempe if they lost to the Cornhuskers. Nebraska had shunned the Fiesta officials, possibly shutting themselves out of the bowls in the event of a loss.

Ultimately, the Sooners came out of Norman with the conference title and a shot at a national title in the Orange Bowl, and it turned out to not even be close. Three turnovers in the fourth quarter had ended the Huskers' chances. Oklahoma scored on all three to make it five touchdowns from six Nebraska turnovers. The Sooners came away with a 25-point victory over the second-ranked team in the land.

Once again, it was the Oklahoma defense that made the big plays when they needed to and controlled the Nebraska offense, limiting them to 245 total yards, only 70 on the ground. Ferragamo, who came into the game with high expectations, had completed 13 of his 25 passes for 146 yards. His four turnovers, however, had spoiled the game for Nebraska, and Oklahoma was on its way to face Michigan in the 1976 Orange Bowl.

=== Michigan—Orange Bowl ===
Orange Bowl: #4 Michigan Wolverines vs. #2 Oklahoma Sooners (10–1)

Quarter	1	2	3	4	Total
Michigan	0	0	0	6	6
Oklahoma	0	7	0	7	14

at Orange Bowl, Miami, Florida

- Date: January 1, 1976
- Game attendance: 76,799
- TV announcers (NBC): Jim Simpson and John Brodie
- Recap/Box

Game information

Second quarter

- OU – Billy Brooks 39-yard run (Tony DiRienzo kick). Oklahoma 7–0.

Fourth quarter

- OU – Steve Davis 9-yard run (Tony DiRienzo kick). Oklahoma 14–0.
- MICH – Gordon Bell 2-yard run (run failed). Oklahoma 14–6.

Top passers

- MICH – Rick Leach – 2/16, 33 yards, 3 INT
- OU – Steve Davis – 3/5, 63 yards

Top rushers

- MICH – Rick Leach – 13 rushes, 62 yards
- OU – Joe Washington – 17 rushes, 73 yards

Top receivers

- MICH – Gordon Bell – 1 reception, 17 yards
- OU – Tinker Owens – 3 receptions, 63 yards

UCLA upset top-ranked Ohio State earlier in the day, and Oklahoma knew that it had a chance for a national title in Barry Switzer's first bowl game as a head coach. It wouldn't be easy. The Wolverines were a punishing team, and made the Sooners know it early. In the end, a 39-yard end around by Billy Brooks and a nine-yard keeper by Steve Davis were enough for a 14–6 victory and a fifth national championship.

== Roster ==
Complete Roster of 1975 season
Quarterbacks: Tony Antone – Freshman; 2 Dean Blevins – Sophomore; 5 Steve Davis^{†} – Senior; 14 Kerry Jackson – Senior; 10 Thomas Lott – Freshman; 12 Joe McReynolds – Sophomore; Louis Patmon – Sophomore; Running backs: 34 Jimmy Rogers – Sophomore; Ken Crosswhite FB – Junior; Jim Culbreath FB – Senior; 46 Calvin Harris FB – Sophomore; 37 Larry Lawton FB – Junior; 42 Jim Littrell FB^{†} – Senior; Robin Roof FB – Junior; Doug Simcik FB – Sophomore; Larry Briggs – Senior; 25 Greg Byram – Freshman; 28 George Cumby – Freshman; Jerry Foster – Senior; 44 Mike Gaither – Freshman; Greg Hutchings – Sophomore; 32 Horace Ivory – Junior; 30 Kenny King – Freshman; 23 Woodie Shepard – Freshman; 20 Billy Sims – Freshman; Edward Williams – Sophomore; 24 Joe Washington^{†} – Senior; 4 Elvis Peacock^{†} – Sophomore; Receivers: 82 Billy Brooks^{†} – Senior; Bill Gill – Freshman; 33 Bud Hebert – Freshman; Lee Hover – Sophomore; Jimbo Owens – Sophomore; 11 Tinker Owens^{†} – Senior; Terry Williams – Sophomore; Tight ends: 83 Kent Bradford – Freshman; Howard Humphreys/Humphrey – Sophomore; Craig Lund – Junior; Reggie Mathis – Sophomore; 47 Wayne Petties – Freshman; John Randolph – Sophomore; 81 Keith Thomas – Junior; John Trest – Freshman	Offensive line: Phil Applegate T – Sophomore; 69 Ralph Kulbeth T – Junior; 68 Bill O'Gara T – Freshman; 67 Ron Ross T – Freshman; 73 Paul Tabor T – Freshman; 74 Phil Tabor T – Freshman; 94 Mark Wilson T – Freshman; Karl Baldischwiler OT – Sophomore; Sam Claphan OT – Sophomore; Reed Coody OT – Junior; 72 Jim Dodds OT – Junior; 75 Chez Evans OT – Junior; 78 Leo Martin OT – Senior; 79 Mike Vaughan OT^{†} – Junior; Jeff Ward OT – Sophomore; Lonnie Wright OT – Junior; Tyrone Armstrong OG – Sophomore; 65 Larry Duke OG – Junior; Jody Farthing OG – Sophomore; 63 Jay Holman OG – Sophomore; 60 Jaime Melendez OG – Sophomore; 66 Terry Webb OG^{†}; 58 Jeff Bodin C – Senior; 55 Dennis Buchanan C – Senior; 52 Todd Dutton C – Sophomore; Mike Spencer C – Junior; Defensive line: 88 Duane Baccus DE – Junior; Gary Bishop DE – Junior; 92 Victor Brown DE – Sophomore; Marshall Cantrell DE – Sophomore; 54 Jimbo Elrod DE^{†}; Kenneth Franklin DE – Sophomore; Mike Mitchell DE – Sophomore; 89 Mike Phillips DE – Junior; Terry Sherman DE – Sophomore; David Bentley DT – Junior; 71 Anthony Bryant DT – Junior; Brett Cargill DT – Sophomore; Joel Estes DT – Sophomore; Dave Hudgens DT – Senior; Harvey Johnson DT – Sophomore; 76 Richard Murray DT – Sophomore; Phil Roland DT – Sophomore; 93 Lee Roy Selmon DT^{†}; 56 Glenn Comeaux NG – Sophomore; Reggie Kinlaw NG – Freshman; Don Morton NG – Senior; 91 Dewey Selmon NG^{†}; 98 George Walrond NG – Junior	Linebackers: 49 Marty Brecht – Junior; 40 Bill Dalke – Sophomore; George Davis – Junior; 50 Barry Dittman – Freshman; Rusty Griffis – Sophomore; 80 Victor Hicks – Freshman; 85 Daryl Hunt – Freshman; Steve Kunkle – Senior; Danny McCullough – Sophomore; 57 Obie Moore – Sophomore; 59 Doug Morgan – Freshman; Ted Phillips – Sophomore; 43 Greg Roberts – Freshman; 39 Greg Sellmyer – Freshman; 38 Jamie Thomas – Senior; 48 Russ Williamson – Sophomore; Defensive backs: 17 Jerry Anderson CB – Junior; Russell E Johnson DB – Junior; Vickey Ray Anderson CB – Sophomore; Roger/Rogers Owens CB – Sophomore; Jeff Brown DB – Sophomore; John Bunch DB – Sophomore; Tyrrell Jackson DB – Sophomore; Steve Larghe DB – Sophomore; Mike Pleasant DB – Sophomore; Mike Babb DHB – Freshman; 1 Zac Henderson FS – Sophomore; 27 Jerry Reese FS – Junior; 21 Sidney Brown LCB – Junior; 26 Frank Rohr LCB – Sophomore; 16 Terry Peters RCB – Sophomore; 31 Eric Van Camp RCB – Senior; 15 Mike Birks SS – Senior; 7 Scott Hill SS – Junior; 8 Myron Shoate SS – Sophomore; Kickers: 3 Tony DiRienzo K – Senior; 33 Bill Shirk K – Sophomore; Uwe von Schamann K – Freshman
† Starter at position * Injured; did not play in 1975. Courtesy of Soonerstats.com

== Awards and honors ==
=== All-Americans ===
- Lee Roy Selmon, Defensive tackle
- Dewey Selmon, Noseguard
- Terry Webb, Offensive guard
- Mike Vaughan, Offensive tackle
- Billy Brooks, Split end
- Jimbo Elrod, Defensive end
- Tinker Owens, Split end
- Joe Washington, Halfback

=== Individual award winners ===
- Lee Roy Selmon – Outland Trophy, Lombardi Award

== NFL draft ==
The following Oklahoma players were selected in the 1976 NFL draft following the season.

Round	Pick	Player	Position	NFL team
1	1	Lee Roy Selmon	Defensive end	Tampa Bay Buccaneers
1	4	Joe Washington	Running back	San Diego Chargers
1	11	Billy Brooks	Wide receiver	Cincinnati Bengals
2	60	Dewey Selmon	Defensive tackle	Tampa Bay Buccaneers
4	96	Tinker Owens	Wide receiver	New Orleans Saints
5	144	Jimbo Elrod	Linebacker	Kansas City Chiefs
8	212	Tony DiRienzo	Kicker	San Diego Chargers
