= 1975 West Texas State Buffaloes football team =

American college football season

1975 West Texas State Buffaloes football
- Conference: Missouri Valley Conference
- Record: 5–6 (2–2 MVC)
- Head coach: Gene Mayfield (5th season)
- Home stadium: Kimbrough Memorial Stadium

1975 Missouri Valley Conference football standings
	Conf.					Overall
Team	W		L		T	W		L		T
Tulsa $	4	–	0	–	0	7	–	4	–	0
New Mexico State	2	–	2	–	0	5	–	6	–	0
West Texas State	2	–	2	–	0	5	–	6	–	0
Drake	1	–	3	–	0	3	–	8	–	0
Wichita State	1	–	3	–	0	3	–	8	–	0
$ – Conference champion

The 1975 West Texas State Buffaloes football team was an American football team that represented West Texas State University (now known as West Texas A&M University) as a member of the Missouri Valley Conference (MVC) during the 1975 NCAA Division I football season. In their fifth year under head coach Gene Mayfield, the Buffaloes compiled an overall record of 5–6 with a mark of 2–2 in conference play, tying for second place in the MVC.

== Schedule ==
Date	Opponent	Site	Result	Attendance	Source
September 6	at Wichita State	Cessna Stadium; Wichita, KS	L 7–13	20,175	
September 13	at Lamar*	Cardinal Stadium; Beaumont, TX	W 10–6	14,101	
September 20	Tulsa	Kimbrough Memorial Stadium; Canyon, TX	L 14–23	12,800	
October 4	UT Arlington*	Kimbrough Memorial Stadium; Canyon, TX	L 7–39	11,000	
October 11	at Utah State*	Romney Stadium; Logan, UT	L 17–21	8,849	
October 18	Drake	Kimbrough Memorial Stadium; Canyon, TX	W 24–6	14,032	
November 1	at Northeast Louisiana*	Brown Stadium; Monroe, LA	W 45–20		
November 8	New Mexico State	Kimbrough Memorial Stadium; Canyon, TX	W 38–10	8,600	
November 15	at McNeese State*	Cowboy Stadium; Lake Charles, LA	L 33–39		
November 22	Louisville*	Kimbrough Memorial Stadium; Canyon, TX	W 49–23	4,500	
November 29	at North Texas State*	Fouts Field; Denton, TX	L 15–16	4,360	
*Non-conference game
