= 1975 Lamar Cardinals football team =

American college football season

1975 Lamar Cardinals football
- Conference: Southland Conference
- Record: 1–10 (0–5 Southland)
- Head coach: Vernon Glass (13th season)
- Home stadium: Cardinal Stadium

1975 Southland Conference football standings
	Conf.					Overall
Team	W		L		T	W		L		T
Arkansas State $	5	–	0	–	0	11	–	0	–	0
Louisiana Tech	4	–	1	–	1	8	–	2	–	0
McNeese State	3	–	2	–	0	7	–	4	–	0
Southwestern Louisiana	2	–	3	–	0	6	–	5	–	0
UT Arlington	1	–	4	–	0	4	–	7	–	0
Lamar	0	–	5	–	0	1	–	10	–	0
$ – Conference champion

The 1975 Lamar Cardinals football team represented Lamar University as a member of the Southland Conference during the 1975 NCAA Division I football season. Led by Vernon Glass in his 13th and final season as head coach, the Cardinals compiled an overall record of 1–10 with a mark of 0–5 in conference play, placing last out of six teams in the Southland. Lamar played home games at Cardinal Stadium in Beaumont, Texas.

Playing Southern Miss in the Louisiana Superdome and Houston in the Houston Astrodome, the Cardinals became "...the first collegiate team to play games in two domed stadiums in the same season".

== Schedule ==
Date	Opponent	Site	Result	Attendance	Source
September 6	at Houston*	Houston Astrodome; Houston, TX	L 3–20	24,075	
September 13	West Texas State*	Cardinal Stadium; Beaumont, TX	L 6–10	14,101	
September 20	New Mexico State	Cardinal Stadium; Beaumont, TX	L 14–17	10,024	
October 4	Louisiana Tech	Cardinal Stadium; Beaumont, TX	L 10–24	11,109	
October 11	at Northeast Louisiana*	Brown Stadium; Monroe, LA	L 7–34	7,800	
October 18	at Southwestern Louisiana	Cajun Field; Lafayette, LA (rivalry)	L 12–21		
October 25	Arkansas State	Cardinal Stadium; Beaumont, TX	L 0–17	500	
November 1	vs. Southern Miss*	Louisiana Superdome; New Orleans, LA	L 3–43	8,700	
November 8	at UT Arlington	Turnpike Stadium; Arlington, TX	L 24–37	6,300	
November 22	Southern Illinois*	Cardinal Stadium; Beaumont, TX	W 30–10	5,702	
November 29	at McNeese State	Cowboy Stadium; Lake Charles, LA (Battle of the Border)	L 10–20		
*Non-conference game
