= Rick Engles =

American football player (born 1954)

No. 5, 17, 13
- Position: Punter

Personal information
- Born: August 18, 1954 (age 72); Tulsa, Oklahoma, U.S.
- Listed height: 5 ft 11 in (1.80 m)
- Listed weight: 177 lb (80 kg)

Career information
- High school: Central
- College: Tulsa
- NFL draft: 1976: 3rd round, 89th overall pick

Career history
- Seattle Seahawks (1976–1977); Pittsburgh Steelers (1977); Philadelphia Eagles (1978); Green Bay Packers (1980)*
- * Offseason or practice squad member only

Career NFL statistics
- Punts: 122
- Punt yards: 4,680
- Longest punt: 55
- Stats at Pro Football Reference

Rick B. Engles (born August 18, 1954) is an American former professional football player who played in three National Football League (NFL) seasons from 1976 to 1978 for the Seattle Seahawks, Pittsburgh Steelers and Philadelphia Eagles.
