= 1975 Nebraska Cornhuskers football team =

American college football season

1975 Nebraska Cornhuskers football

Big 8 co-champion

Fiesta Bowl, L 14–17 vs. Arizona State
- Conference: Big Eight Conference

Ranking
- Coaches: No. 9
- AP: No. 9
- Record: 10–2 (6–1 Big 8)
- Head coach: Tom Osborne (3rd season)
- Offensive scheme: I formation
- Defensive coordinator: Monte Kiffin (7th season)
- Base defense: 5–2
- Home stadium: Memorial Stadium

1975 Big Eight Conference football standings
| | Conf. | | | | | Overall |
| Team | W | | L | | T | W | | L | | T |
|---|---|---|---|---|---|---|---|---|---|---|
| No. 1 Oklahoma + | 6 | – | 1 | – | 0 | 11 | – | 1 | – | 0 |
| No. 9 Nebraska + | 6 | – | 1 | – | 0 | 10 | – | 2 | – | 0 |
| No. 16 Colorado | 5 | – | 2 | – | 0 | 9 | – | 3 | – | 0 |
| Kansas | 4 | – | 3 | – | 0 | 7 | – | 5 | – | 0 |
| Missouri | 3 | – | 4 | – | 0 | 6 | – | 5 | – | 0 |
| Oklahoma State | 3 | – | 4 | – | 0 | 7 | – | 4 | – | 0 |
| Iowa State | 1 | – | 6 | – | 0 | 4 | – | 7 | – | 0 |
| Kansas State | 0 | – | 7 | – | 0 | 3 | – | 8 | – | 0 |
+ – Conference co-champions; Rankings from AP Poll

The 1975 Nebraska Cornhuskers football team represented the University of Nebraska–Lincoln in the 1975 NCAA Division I football season. The team was coached by Tom Osborne and played their home games in Memorial Stadium in Lincoln, Nebraska.

== Schedule ==
| Date | Time | Opponent | Rank | Site | TV | Result | Attendance | Source |
|---|---|---|---|---|---|---|---|---|
| September 13 | 1:30 pm | LSU* | No. 6 | Memorial Stadium; Lincoln, NE | | W 10–7 | 76,259 | |
| September 20 | 1:30 pm | Indiana* | No. 6 | Memorial Stadium; Lincoln, NE | | W 45–0 | 76,022 | |
| September 27 | 1:30 pm | TCU* | No. 4 | Memorial Stadium; Lincoln, NE | | W 56–14 | 75,931 | |
| October 4 | 1:30 pm | Miami (FL)* | No. 4 | Memorial Stadium; Lincoln, NE (rivalry) | | W 31–16 | 76,231 | |
| October 11 | 1:30 pm | Kansas^{†} | No. 4 | Memorial Stadium; Lincoln, NE (rivalry) | | W 16–0 | 76,285 | |
| October 18 | 1:30 pm | at Oklahoma State | No. 4 | Lewis Field; Stillwater, OK | | W 28–20 | 48,500 | |
| October 25 | 1:30 pm | No. 10 Colorado | No. 4 | Memorial Stadium; Lincoln, NE (rivalry) | | W 63–21 | 76,509 | |
| November 1 | 12:00 pm | at No. 12 Missouri | No. 3 | Faurot Field; Columbia, MO (rivalry) | ABC | W 30–7 | 68,195 | |
| November 8 | 1:30 pm | at Kansas State | No. 3 | KSU Stadium; Manhattan, KS (rivalry) | | W 12–0 | 41,300 | |
| November 15 | 1:30 pm | Iowa State | No. 2 | Memorial Stadium; Lincoln, NE (rivalry) | | W 52–0 | 76,131 | |
| November 22 | 1:30 pm | at No. 7 Oklahoma | No. 2 | Oklahoma Memorial Stadium; Norman, OK (rivalry) | | L 10–35 | 70,286 | |
| December 26 | 2:00 pm | vs. No. 7 Arizona State* | No. 6 | Sun Devil Stadium; Tempe, AZ (Fiesta Bowl) | CBS | L 14–17 | 51,396 | |
*Non-conference game; ^{†}Homecoming; Rankings from AP Poll released prior to the game; All times are in Central time

== Roster ==
| Andrews, George #96 (So.) DE; Anthony, Monte #49 (So.) IB; Avery, Scott #57 (Jr.) DT; Belka, Jim #47 (Jr.) LB Block, King #55 (So.) LB; Bonness, Bob (So.) DE; Bonness, Rik #54 (Sr.) C Borg, Tim #19 (So.) DB; Brock, Dan #94 (Jr.) DT; Brown, Kenny (So.) WB; Burns, Ed #17 (Jr.) QB; Burrow, Jim #2 (Sr.) DB; Butterfield, Dave #34 (Jr.) DB; Cabell, Jake #24 (Jr.) DB; Carpenter, Jeff #37 (So.) LB; Clark, Kelvin #73 (So.) OT; Clark, Mike (So.) OT; Coccia, Tom #90 (Sr.) DE; Cooley, Lawrence (So.) OG; Costanzo, Rich #77 (Sr.) OT; Coyle, Mike #42 (Sr.) PK; Craig, Curtis #33 (So.) WB; Davis, Tom #52 (So.) C Davis, Tony #25 (Sr.) FB; Dervin, Joe (So.) LB; Donnell, Dodie #45 (So.) FB; Eichelberger, Percy #44 (Jr.) LB; Eveland, Al #43 (Jr.) PK; Everett, Earl #9 (Jr.) WB; Ferragamo, Vince #15 (Jr.) QB; Fischer, Tim #10 (So.) DB; Folsom, Bob (Jr.) FB; Fultz, Mike #72 (Jr.) DT; Gade, Steve #56 (So.) C Galano, Bobby #59 (So.) OG; Garcia, Randy #18 (So.) QB; Gast, Reg #82 (So.) DE; Gillespie, Dave #28 (Jr.) IB | Gissler, Dean #97 (Sr.) DT; Glenn, Steve #71 (So.) OT; Hansen, Jeff #48 (So.) LB; Harvey, Ted #31 (So.) DB; Hayes, Bob #76 (So.) OT; Heiser, Tom #27 (Sr.) WB; Higgs, Gary (Jr.) FB; Hunter, Ken #78 (Jr.) OT; Jenkins, Brad #92 (Sr.) TE; Jones, Chuck #35 (Sr.) DB; Jorgensen, Greg #63 (So.) OG; Justice, Jason #38 (So.) FB; Kane, John (Unk) LB; Kraft, Bill #83 (So.) SE; Kroneberger, Jon #64 (So.) OT; Lee, John #69 (Sr.) MG; Lehigh, Pat #6 (So.) DB; Lessman, Randy #39 (Jr.) P Lindquist, Steve #68 (So.) OG; Lingenfelter, Bob #70 (Jr.) OT; Loken, Rocke #16 (So.) SE; Luck, Terry #11 (Sr.) QB; Malito, Chuck #89 (Jr.) SE; Markley, Paul (So.) DB; Markus, Steve (So.) LB; Martin, Bob #87 (Sr.) DE; Miller, Dan #58 (So.) OG; Mills, George #75 (Sr.) DT; Monds, Wonder #26 (Sr.) DB; Mushinskie, Larry #88 (Sr.) TE; Nitzel, Ron #85 (Jr.) SE; Ohrt, Tom #74 (So.) OT; O'Leary, John #14 (Sr.) IB; Panneton, Rick #95 (Sr.) TE; Payne, Dennis #13 (So.) DB; Phillips, Ray #80 (Jr.) DE; Pillen, Clete #61 (Jr.) LB; Pittman, Randy #1 (So.) WB | Plucknett, John #50 (Jr.) MG; Poeschl, Randy (So.) DT; Porter, G.M. (Budge) (So.) DB; Pruitt, Ron #91 (Sr.) DT; Pullen, Jeff #36 (Jr.) MG; Redding, Dave #84 (Sr.) DE; Rick, Randy #22 (Jr.) DE; Ridder, Tom (So.) DE; Samuel, Tony #98 (So.) DE; Schmidt, Dan #51 (Jr.) OG; Schroeder, John (So.) OG; Shamblin, Dave #81 (Jr.) SE; Smith, Kent #23 (So.) DB; Sorley, Tom #12 (So.) QB; Spaeth, Ken #86 (So.) TE; Stacey, Kurt #3 (So.) DB; Stewart, Byron #30 (So.) IB; Stovall, Rod #5 (So.) DB; Talley, Chester #32 (Jr.) DE; Thomas, Bobby #8 (Jr.) SE; Thomas, Tom #53 (Sr.) C Thompson, Mike (So.) SE; Thornton, Willie #65 (Sr.) MG; Valasek, Larry #4 (So.) DB; Vanous, Russ (So.) P Varner, Rich #67 (Jr.) OG; Vernon, Kirby (So.) DB; Waldemore, Stan #62 (So.) OG; Walton, Darrell #7 (So.) WB; Webb, Mitchell #99 (So.) MG; Wied, Jerry #93 (Sr.) DT; Wightman, Jim #46 (So.) LB; Wilkins, Roger (So.) OT; Williquette, Jim #41 (So.) DB; Young, Larry #40 (So.) LB; Zabrocki, Dale #21 (So.) IB; Zanetich, Nick #66 (Jr.) OG |

=== Depth chart ===
Defense

FS
Jim Burrow
Larry Valasek
Dennis Payne

| INSDIE | INSDIE |
|---|---|
| Cletus Pillen | Jim Whightman |
| Precy Eichelberger | Jeff Hansen |
| Jeff Carpenter | Randy Lessman |

MONSTER BACK
Wonder Monds
Kent Smith
Tim Borg

CB
Chuck Jones
Kurt Stacey
Rod Stovall

| DE | DT | NT | DT | DE |
|---|---|---|---|---|
| Ray Phillips | Jerry Wied | John Lee | Mike Fultz | Bob Martin |
| Dave Redding | Dean Gissler | Jeff Pullen | George Mills | Tony Samuel |
| Georgie Andrews | Randy Poeschl | Willie Thornton | Dan Brock | Tom Coccia |

CB
Dave Butterfield
Ted Harvey
Jake Cabell

Offense

SE
Bobby Thomas
Chuck Malito
Dave Shamblin

| LT | LG | C | RG | RT |
|---|---|---|---|---|
| Bob Lingenfelter | Dan Schmidt | Rik Bonness | Rich Costanzo | Steve Hoins |
| Bob Hayes | Greg Jorgensen | Tom Davis | Stan Waldemore | Tom Ohrt |
| Steve Glenn | Rich Varner | Tom Thomas | Steve Lindquist | Bob Hayes |

TE
Brad Jenkins
Larry Mushinskie
Ken Spaeth
Rick Panneton

WB
Curtis Craig
Tom Heiser
Kenny Brown

QB
Vince Ferragamo
Terry Luck
Randy Garcia

FB
Tony Davis
Dodie Donnell
Gary Higgs

Special teams

RB
Monte Anthony
John O'Leary
Dave Gillespie

== Coaching staff ==
| Name | Title | First year in this position | Years at Nebraska | Alma mater |
| Tom Osborne | Head Coach; Offensive coordinator | 1973 | 1964–1997 | Hastings College |
| Monte Kiffin | Defensive Coordinator | 1973 | 1967–1976 | Nebraska |
| Cletus Fischer | Offensive Line | | 1960–1985 | Nebraska |
| Jim Ross | | | 1962–1976 | |
| John Melton | Tight Ends; Wingbacks | 1973 | 1962–1988 | Wyoming |
| Mike Corgan | Running Backs | 1962 | 1962–1982 | Notre Dame |
| Warren Powers | Defensive Backs | | 1969–1976 | Nebraska |
| Boyd Epley | Head Strength Coach | 1969 | 1969–2003 | Nebraska |
| Bill Myles | Offensive Line | 1972 | 1972–1976 | Drake University |
| Jerry Moore | Wide Receivers | 1973 | 1973–1978 | Baylor |
| George Darlington | Defensive Ends | 1973 | 1973–2002 | Rutgers |
| Milt Tenopir | Offensive Line | 1974 | 1974–2002 | Sterling |

== Game summaries ==
=== LSU ===
LSU at #6 Nebraska [box score]

| Team | 1 | 2 | 3 | 4 | Total |
|---|---|---|---|---|---|
| LSU | 0 | 0 | 7 | 0 | 7 |
| • #6 Nebraska | 0 | 7 | 3 | 0 | 10 |

- Date: 1975-09-13
- Location: Memorial Stadium, Lincoln, Nebraska
- Game attendance: 76,259
- Referee: Vance Carlson

For the first time ever, the Cornhuskers were not able to suit up all players due to a new NCAA rule limiting the number of suited players to 60. Also, four players were ruled ineligible by the NCAA, further limiting the resources available to Nebraska. Still, the Tigers were unable to score until after the half, and their only touchdown was not sufficient to overcome the 10 Cornhusker points already on the board, and Nebraska started the season with a win.

Cornhusker safety Jim Burrow began his senior season against the team his son, Joe, would lead to the 2019 national championship.

=== Indiana ===
Indiana at #6 Nebraska [box score]

| Team | 1 | 2 | 3 | 4 | Total |
|---|---|---|---|---|---|
| Indiana | 0 | 0 | 0 | 0 | 0 |
| • #6 Nebraska | 10 | 14 | 14 | 7 | 45 |

- Date: 1975-09-20
- Location: Memorial Stadium, Lincoln, Nebraska
- Game attendance: 76,022

Nebraska intercepted an Indiana pass on the first play to set the tone as the Cornhuskers rolled with ease over the Hoosiers in Lincoln. A total of twelve Nebraska runners added ground yards to their career totals in this game as the team collected 300 yards rushing, while the Blackshirts obtained a shutout.

=== TCU ===
TCU at #4 Nebraska [box score]

| Team | 1 | 2 | 3 | 4 | Total |
|---|---|---|---|---|---|
| TCU | 0 | 7 | 0 | 7 | 14 |
| • #4 Nebraska | 14 | 14 | 14 | 14 | 56 |

- Date: 1975-09-27
- Location: Memorial Stadium, Lincoln, Nebraska
- Game attendance: 75,931

After Nebraska punched in two 1st-quarter touchdowns, TCU never got closer to the lead again, scoring only 14 of their own the entire game while the Cornhuskers put 14 more in each quarter. Another dominating performance was turned in by the Blackshirts, who allowed only one touchdown and held the Horned Frogs to just 16 yards on the ground.

=== Miami ===
Miami at #4 Nebraska [box score]

| Team | 1 | 2 | 3 | 4 | Total |
|---|---|---|---|---|---|
| Miami | 6 | 3 | 0 | 7 | 16 |
| • #4 Nebraska | 0 | 7 | 10 | 14 | 31 |

- Date: 1975-10-04
- Location: Memorial Stadium, Lincoln, Nebraska
- Game attendance: 76,231

Someone forget to tell Miami to give up before the game started, and the Hurricanes came out intending to make it a game as they jump started the scoring with two field goals to lead 6–0 and another to lead 9–7 at the half, and Nebraska first 7 points were set up by a turnover instead of any serious offensive production. Halftime adjustments and superior conditioning took over for the rest of the game, however, as Nebraska ran off 24 unanswered points, making Miami's final touchdown with just over two minutes remaining too little, too late.

=== Kansas ===
Kansas at #4 Nebraska [box score]

| Team | 1 | 2 | 3 | 4 | Total |
|---|---|---|---|---|---|
| Kansas | 0 | 0 | 0 | 0 | 0 |
| • #4 Nebraska | 3 | 3 | 3 | 7 | 16 |

- Date: 1975-10-11
- Location: Memorial Stadium, Lincoln, Nebraska
- Game attendance: 76,285

Nebraska prevented a 1st half Kansas field goal on their way to posting a second shutout, closing their long five-game opening home stand with a 5–0 record. Although the Cornhuskers did not score big nor often, it made no difference as the scoreless Jayhawks watched the game slip farther from their reach as time ticked away. Kansas completed only 2 of 10 passes, and obtained only 7 first downs, while the Cornhuskers had double the Jayhawks yards by both ground and air.

=== Oklahoma State ===
#4 Nebraska at Oklahoma State [box score]

| Team | 1 | 2 | 3 | 4 | Total |
|---|---|---|---|---|---|
| • #4 Nebraska | 14 | 7 | 7 | 0 | 28 |
| Oklahoma State | 0 | 7 | 13 | 0 | 20 |

- Date: 1975-10-18
- Location: Lewis Field, Stillwater, Oklahoma
- Game attendance: 48,500

Nebraska's first road game of 1975 was not an easy win, despite the strong 14–0 start. Oklahoma State pulled within 14 by the end of the half and within 7 in the 3rd quarter. After another set of touchdowns, the Cowboys were still down by just 8 in the 4th when they capitalized on a bad Cornhusker punt snap and took over inside the Nebraska 25. The Blackshirts made a stand when Oklahoma State got inside the Nebraska 5, and forced the Cowboys to go 3-and-out on three scoring attempts to preserve the win.

=== Colorado ===
Colorado at #4 Nebraska [box score]

| Team | 1 | 2 | 3 | 4 | Total |
|---|---|---|---|---|---|
| Colorado | 7 | 0 | 14 | 0 | 21 |
| • #4 Nebraska | 21 | 21 | 21 | 0 | 63 |

- Date: 1975-10-25
- Location: Memorial Stadium, Lincoln, Nebraska
- Game attendance: 76,509

Scoring summary
| 1 | COL | Dave Williams 74-yard run (Mackenzie kick) | COL 7–0 |
| 1 | NEB | Thomas 42-yard pass from Vince Ferragamo (Coyle kick) | Tied 7–7 |
| 1 | NEB | John O'Leary 10-yard run (Coyle kick) | NEB 14–7 |
| 1 | NEB | Anthony 2-yard run (Coyle kick) | NEB 21–7 |
| 2 | NEB | Davis 1-yard run (Coyle kick) | NEB 28–7 |
| 2 | NEB | John O'Leary 1-yard run (Coyle kick) | NEB 35–7 |
| 2 | NEB | Jenkins 5-yard pass from Vince Ferragamo (Coyle kick) | NEB 42–7 |
| 3 | NEB | Anthony 1-yard run (Coyle kick) | NEB 49–7 |
| 3 | NEB | Higgs 2-yard run (Coyle kick) | NEB 56–7 |
| 3 | NEB | Gillespie 14-yard run (Coyle kick) | NEB 63–7 |
| 3 | COL | Dave Williams 6-yard run (Mackenzie kick) | NEB 63–14 |
| 3 | COL | Kelleher 3-yard run (Mackenzie kick) | NEB 63–21 |

Statistically, the game was close save for Nebraska's 350–268 rushing edge and 2–0 interception margin, but the scoreboard told another story. Even though Colorado scored first at the start of the game, the Cornhuskers unleashed a scoring onslaught that put the Buffaloes behind 42–7 at the half, putting the game far out of reach long before Nebraska backups entered the game in the 4th quarter.

=== Missouri ===
#3 Nebraska at #12 Missouri [box score]

| Team | 1 | 2 | 3 | 4 | Total |
|---|---|---|---|---|---|
| • #3 Nebraska | 10 | 6 | 7 | 7 | 30 |
| #12 Missouri | 0 | 7 | 0 | 0 | 7 |

- Date: 1975-11-01
- Location: Faurot Field, Columbia, Missouri
- Game attendance: 68,195

Nebraska Head Coach Tom Osborne notched his first career win against 12th-ranked Missouri, in Columbia, with style and a little help from well-executed trickery. The 'Bummeroosky" play worked flawlessly, even fooling the TV cameras, as Nebraska lined up in punt formation and snapped to FB Tony Davis, who immediately passed the ball back through the legs of IB John O'Leary and then faked a pass to a bait receiver. As the entire Cornhusker unit moved to simulate the punt fake play, the Tigers chomped on the bait and took off to the right in pursuit while O'Leary remained motionless with the ball hidden until no one remained before jaunting 40 yards untouched for the touchdown.

=== Kansas State ===
#3 Nebraska at Kansas State [box score]

| Team | 1 | 2 | 3 | 4 | Total |
|---|---|---|---|---|---|
| • #3 Nebraska | 9 | 0 | 3 | 0 | 12 |
| Kansas State | 0 | 0 | 0 | 0 | 0 |

- Date: 1975-11-08
- Location: KSU Stadium, Manhattan, Kansas
- Game attendance: 41,300

It was a battle of the defenses as the Blackshirts rang up their 3rd shutout on the season, while Kansas State managed to hold Nebraska to just 12 points.

=== Iowa State ===
Iowa State at #2 Nebraska [box score]

| Team | 1 | 2 | 3 | 4 | Total |
|---|---|---|---|---|---|
| Iowa State | 0 | 0 | 0 | 0 | 0 |
| • #2 Nebraska | 14 | 17 | 7 | 14 | 52 |

- Date: 1975-11-15
- Location: Memorial Stadium, Lincoln, Nebraska
- Game attendance: 76,131

Iowa State probably knew they were going to have a bad day when they fumbled the opening kickoff, allowing Nebraska to convert that turnover into 7 points. Iowa State never saw the scoreboard as Nebraska put up yet another shutout for the season, their 4th, on the way to dismantling Iowa State 52–0.

=== Oklahoma ===
#2 Nebraska at #7 Oklahoma [box score]

| Team | 1 | 2 | 3 | 4 | Total |
|---|---|---|---|---|---|
| #2 Nebraska | 3 | 0 | 7 | 0 | 10 |
| • #7 Oklahoma | 0 | 7 | 7 | 21 | 35 |

- Date: 1975-11-22
- Location: Oklahoma Memorial Stadium, Norman, Oklahoma
- Game attendance: 70,286

Nebraska scored first on a field goal, but scoring production fizzled as Oklahoma led 7–3 at the half. The Cornhuskers took advantage of a Sooner fumble in the 3rd quarter to go up 10–7, but Nebraska soon committed its own turnover to help Oklahoma get back up front, and it didn't stop there. Two more subsequent, painful Cornhusker turnovers sealed the game as Oklahoma converted each for points and handed Nebraska their first loss of the year and forced them to share the Big 8 title.

=== Arizona State ===
#6 Nebraska at #7 Arizona State [box score]

| Team | 1 | 2 | 3 | 4 | Total |
|---|---|---|---|---|---|
| #6 Nebraska | 0 | 7 | 7 | 0 | 14 |
| • #7 Arizona State | 3 | 3 | 0 | 11 | 17 |

- Date: 1975-12-26
- Location: Sun Devil Stadium, Tempe, Arizona
- Game attendance: 51,396

Nebraska led the Sun Devils through the entire game until the 4th quarter, when a fierce Arizona State Rally brought the score to a 14–14 tie and then 17–14 on a Sun Devil field goal with 4:50 remaining in the game. The Cornhuskers were driving again and progressed to the Arizona State 21 with 2 minutes to go when the Cornhuskers lost an ill-timed fumble to end their hopes for the win. As it turned out, Nebraska's only two losses for the season ended up being to the teams ranked #1 and #2 in the season's final polls.

== Rankings ==
Ranking movements Legend: ██ Increase in ranking ██ Decrease in ranking
| | Week | | | | | | | | | | | | | | |
| Poll | Pre | 1 | 2 | 3 | 4 | 5 | 6 | 7 | 8 | 9 | 10 | 11 | 12 | 13 | Final |
|---|---|---|---|---|---|---|---|---|---|---|---|---|---|---|---|
| AP | 7 | 6 | 6 | 4 | 4 | 4 | 4 | 4 | 3 | 3 | 2 | 2 | 7 | 6 | 9 |
| Coaches | | | | | | | | | | | | | | | 9 |

== Awards ==
| Award | Name(s) |
|---|---|
| All-America 1st team | Rik Bonness, Bob Martin, Wonder Monds |
| Big 8 Offensive Newcomer of the Year | Vince Ferragamo |
| All-Big 8 1st team | Rik Bonness, Dave Butterfield, Mike Fultz, Bob Martin, Wonder Monds |
| All-Big 8 2nd team | Jimmy Burrow, Mike Coyle, Tony Davis, Steve Hoins, John Lee, Bob Lingenfelter, Clete Pillen, Dan Schmidt, Bobby Thomas |

=== NFL and Pro Players ===
The following Nebraska players who participated in the 1975 season later moved on to the next level and joined a professional or semi-pro team as draftees or free agents.

| Name | Team |
|---|---|
| George Andrews | Los Angeles Rams |
| Monte Anthony | Baltimore Colts |
| Rik Bonness | Oakland Raiders |
| Ed Burns | New Orleans Saints |
| Jim Burrow | Green Bay Packers |
| Kelvin Clark | Denver Broncos |
| Tom Davis | Toronto Argonauts |
| Tony Davis | Cincinnati Bengals |
| Vince Ferragamo | Los Angeles Rams |
| Mike Fultz | New Orleans Saints |
| John Lee | San Diego Chargers |
| Bob Lingenfelter | Cleveland Browns |
| Terry Luck | Cleveland Browns |
| Bob Martin | New York Jets |
| Wonder Monds | Ottawa Rough Riders |
| John O'Leary | Montreal Alouettes |
| Ray Phillips | Cincinnati Bengals |
| Stan Waldemore | New York Jets |
