= Herb McMath =

American football player (1954–2016)

No. 61
- Positions: Defensive tackle, defensive end

Personal information
- Born: September 6, 1954; Coahoma, Mississippi, U.S.
- Died: October 5, 2016 (aged 62); Springfield, Illinois, U.S.
- Listed height: 6 ft 4 in (1.93 m)
- Listed weight: 248 lb (112 kg)

Career information
- High school: Springfield Southeast (IL)
- College: Morningside
- NFL draft: 1976: 4th round, 110th overall pick

Career history
- Oakland Raiders (1976); Green Bay Packers (1977)

Awards and highlights
- Super Bowl champion (XI)

Career NFL statistics
- Sacks: 2
- Fumble recoveries: 1
- Stats at Pro Football Reference

Herbert Louis McMath Sr. (September 6, 1954 – October 5, 2016) was an American football defensive tackle and defensive end in the National Football League (NFL) for the Oakland Raiders and the Green Bay Packers. He played 22 games in two seasons in the NFL and was a part of the Raiders 1976 Super Bowl Champion team.
