= 1975 Kansas Jayhawks football team =

American college football season

1975 Kansas Jayhawks football

Sun Bowl, L 19–33 vs. Pittsburgh
- Conference: Big Eight Conference
- Record: 7–5 (4–3 Big 8)
- Head coach: Bud Moore (1st season)
- Offensive coordinator: John Levra (1st season)
- Captains: Rick Kovatch; John Morgan; Steve Taylor
- Home stadium: Memorial Stadium

1975 Big Eight Conference football standings
	Conf.					Overall
Team	W		L		T	W		L		T
No. 1 Oklahoma +	6	–	1	–	0	11	–	1	–	0
No. 9 Nebraska +	6	–	1	–	0	10	–	2	–	0
No. 16 Colorado	5	–	2	–	0	9	–	3	–	0
Kansas	4	–	3	–	0	7	–	5	–	0
Missouri	3	–	4	–	0	6	–	5	–	0
Oklahoma State	3	–	4	–	0	7	–	4	–	0
Iowa State	1	–	6	–	0	4	–	7	–	0
Kansas State	0	–	7	–	0	3	–	8	–	0
+ – Conference co-champions; Rankings from AP Poll

The 1975 Kansas Jayhawks football team represented the University of Kansas as a member of the Big Eight Conference during the 1975 NCAA Division I football season. In their first season under head coach and Big 8 Coach of the Year Bud Moore, the Jayhawks compiled an overall record of 7–5 with a mark of 4–3 against conference opponents, finished in fourth place in the Big 8, and outscored their opponents by a combined total of 262 to 180. Kansas was invited to the Sun Bowl, where they lost to Pittsburgh. The team played home games at Memorial Stadium in Lawrence, Kansas. On November 8, the Jayhawks ended the Oklahoma Sooners’ 37 game unbeaten streak in a dramatic 23–3 upset in Norman. The team's statistical leaders included Nolan Cromwell with 333 passing yards and 1,223 rushing yards, and Waddell Smith with 205 receiving yards. Rick Kovatch, John Morgan, and Steve Taylor were the team captains. Cromwell, RB Laverne Smith, DT Mike Butler and S Kurt Knoff were All Big Eight performers.

== Schedule ==
Date	Opponent	Rank	Site	TV	Result	Attendance	Source
September 13	Washington State*		Memorial Stadium; Lawrence, KS		L 14–18	33,378	
September 20	at Kentucky*		Commonwealth Stadium; Lexington, KY		W 14–10	56,467	
September 27	Oregon State*		Memorial Stadium; Lawrence, KS		W 20–0	47,210	
October 4	at Wisconsin*		Camp Randall Stadium; Madison, WI		W 41–7	76,097	
October 11	at No. 4 Nebraska		Memorial Stadium; Lincoln, NE (rivalry)		L 0–16	76,285	
October 18	at Iowa State		Cyclone Stadium; Ames, IA		W 21–10	42,500	
October 25	Oklahoma State^{†}		Memorial Stadium; Lawrence, KS		L 19–35	44,860	
November 1	Kansas State		Memorial Stadium; Lawrence, KS (rivalry)		W 28–0	53,480	
November 8	at No. 2 Oklahoma		Oklahoma Memorial Stadium; Norman, OK		W 23–3	70,286	
November 15	No. 10 Colorado	No. 17	Memorial Stadium; Lawrence, KS	ABC	L 21–24	40,120	
November 22	No. 18 Missouri		Memorial Stadium; Lawrence, KS (Border War)		W 42–24	52,450	
December 26	vs. No. 20 Pittsburgh*	No. 19	Sun Bowl; El Paso, TX (Sun Bowl)	CBS	L 19–33	30,272	
*Non-conference game; ^{†}Homecoming; Rankings from AP Poll released prior to the game

== Roster ==
1975 Kansas Jayhawks football team roster
Players
Coaches
Offense

Pos.	#	Name	Class
WR	22	Paul Bower	Sr
RB	23	Billy Campfield	So
QB	9	Nolan Cromwell	Jr
G	67	Dave Hentges	Jr
QB		Mike Lloyd	So
OT	64	Lindsey Mason	So
QB	10	Scott McMichael	Sr
C	65	John Morgan	So
OT	76	Dave Scott	So
RB	29	Skip Sharp	Jr
RB	30	Laverne Smith	Jr
OT	72	Blake Thompson	Jr

Defense

Pos.	#	Name	Class
LB	78	Terry Beeson	Jr
DT	77	Mike Butler	Jr
DE	93	Tom Dinkel	So
FS	13	Tom Fitch	So
S	19	Chris Golub	Jr
DE	81	Steve Jones	Jr
CB	18	Kurt Knoff	Sr
LB	69	Rick Kovatch	Sr
CB	20	Eddie Lewis	Sr
LB	57	Don Pile	Jr
CB	34	Steve Taylor	Sr
LB	90	Jeff Turner	Sr

Special teams

Pos.	#	Name	Class

Head coach

- Bud Moore

Coordinators/assistant coaches

Legend

- (C) Team captain
- (S) Suspended
- (I) Ineligible
- Injured
- Redshirt

Roster
