= 1975 Missouri Tigers football team =

American college football season

1975 Missouri Tigers football
- Conference: Big Eight Conference
- Record: 6–5 (3–4 Big 8)
- Head coach: Al Onofrio (5th season)
- Home stadium: Memorial Stadium

1975 Big Eight Conference football standings
	Conf.					Overall
Team	W		L		T	W		L		T
No. 1 Oklahoma +	6	–	1	–	0	11	–	1	–	0
No. 9 Nebraska +	6	–	1	–	0	10	–	2	–	0
No. 16 Colorado	5	–	2	–	0	9	–	3	–	0
Kansas	4	–	3	–	0	7	–	5	–	0
Missouri	3	–	4	–	0	6	–	5	–	0
Oklahoma State	3	–	4	–	0	7	–	4	–	0
Iowa State	1	–	6	–	0	4	–	7	–	0
Kansas State	0	–	7	–	0	3	–	8	–	0
+ – Conference co-champions; Rankings from AP Poll

The 1975 Missouri Tigers football team was an American football team that represented the University of Missouri in the Big Eight Conference (Big 8) during the 1975 NCAA Division I football season. The team compiled a 6–5 record (3–4 against Big 8 opponents), finished in a tie for fifth place in the Big 8, and outscored opponents by a combined total of 282 to 241. Al Onofrio was the head coach for the fifth of seven seasons. The team played its home games at Faurot Field in Columbia, Missouri.

The team's statistical leaders included running back Tony Galbreath with 777 rushing yards, quarterback Steve Pisarkiewicz with 1,792 passing yards and 1,732 yards of total offense, wide receiver Henry Marshall with 945 receiving yards, and placekicker Tim Gibbons with 72 points scored.

== Schedule ==
Date	Opponent	Rank	Site	Result	Attendance	Source
September 8	at No. 2 Alabama*		Legion Field; Birmingham, AL	W 20–7	63,000	
September 20	at Illinois*	No. 5	Memorial Stadium; Champaign, IL (rivalry)	W 30–20	57,059	
September 27	Wisconsin*	No. 5	Faurot Field; Columbia, MO	W 27–21	62,222	
October 4	at No. 12 Michigan*	No. 5	Michigan Stadium; Ann Arbor, MI	L 7–31	104,578	
October 11	No. 14 Oklahoma State	No. 12	Faurot Field; Columbia, MO	W 41–14	60,323	
October 18	at No. 12 Colorado	No. 10	Folsom Field; Boulder, CO	L 20–31	50,239	
October 25	Kansas State	No. 15	Faurot Field; Columbia, MO	W 35–3	62,860	
November 1	No. 3 Nebraska	No. 12	Faurot Field; Columbia, MO (rivalry)	L 7–30	68,195	
November 8	at Iowa State	No. 19	Cyclone Stadium; Ames, IA (rivalry)	W 44–14	41,500	
November 15	No. 6 Oklahoma	No. 18	Faurot Field; Columbia, MO (rivalry)	L 27–28	69,377	
November 22	at Kansas	No. 18	Memorial Stadium; Lawrence, KS (Border War)	L 24–42	52,450	
*Non-conference game; Rankings from AP Poll released prior to the game

== Roster ==
- TE Charley Douglass
- QB Pete Woods
