= Nate Beasley =

American football player (1953–2010)

No. 36
- Position: Running back

Personal information
- Born: June 11, 1953; Austin, Texas, U.S.
- Died: March 10, 2010 (aged 56); Wilmington, Delaware, U.S.
- Listed height: 6 ft 2 in (1.88 m)
- Listed weight: 215 lb (98 kg)

Career information
- High school: Dover Air Force Base (DE)
- College: Delaware State; Delaware
- NFL draft: 1976: 17th round, 481st overall pick

Career history
- Oakland Raiders (1976)*
- * Offseason or practice squad member only

Awards and highlights
- Third-team Little All-American (1974); University of Delaware Athletics Hall of Fame (2011)

Nathan Wayne Beasley (June 11, 1953 – March 10, 2010) was an American football running back. He played college football for the Delaware State Hornets and Delaware Fightin' Blue Hens before being selected in the 1976 NFL draft by the Oakland Raiders, though he did not play with them.

== Early life ==
Beasley was born on June 11, 1953, in Austin, Texas. The son of Richard Beasley, an Air Force Sergeant, Nate Beasley lived in several different states and countries as a child, including "Japan, Alaska, Hawaii and most of the 50 states", according to The Morning News. He began playing football at the age of eight, while living in Japan.

He first attended Male High School in Louisville, Kentucky, before moving to Delaware in 1967. There he played football at Dover Air Force Base High School. He was named best offensive backfield player in 1969. His final career high school match was the Blue–Gold All-Star game held in 1971, in which Beasley scored each touchdown for the Gold as they won 15–12.

== College career ==
Beasley committed to Delaware State University in 1971. After spending one year there, he left to attend University of Delaware. In his first year with the "Fightin' Blue Hens", he spent the year as a redshirt, though he still practiced with the team. "I enjoyed practicing with the team last year," Beasley said in 1973, "but it was tough to practice all week and then sit in the stands during the games. But the coaches kept an interest in me and made me feel part of the team." As a redshirt-freshman that year, the Blue Hens were named national champions.

As a sophomore in 1973, Beasley battled for the starting fullback position with Theo Gregory, though he said there was no rivalry between the two of them. "Theo helps me a lot," he said. "He really knows the technique and he helps me with the little things. He and I are friends. There's no rivalry between us. He'll help me and I'll help him. Whoever plays is fine with us." Gregory ended up with the starting position, and Beasley saw limited playing time.

Beasley earned a starting position as a junior in 1974, rushing for over 700 yards in the fix six games. He missed multiple games mid-season as a result of a broken thumb, making his return versus the Villanova Wildcats on November 2. The Blue Hens compiled a 12–2 record and advanced to the playoffs, but lost in the national championship to Central Michigan. Beasley rushed just four times for ten yards in the game due to an injury.

Beasley returned as starter for his senior season in 1975, compiling 172 rush yards (on 34 attempts) in the first two games, even though he was playing through a pulled hamstring. He was named to the weekly conference all-star team following a game against Akron in week four, after carrying the ball 35 times for 168 yards. In a game against Villanova, a fan held a sign saying "Beasley Yards Are Measly". After he made important contributions in the 14–13 win, The Evening Journal published an article titled "Hens' Beasley not measly".

He rushed for 120 yards in the next game, a win over Maine. Though he was performing well in yards gained, Beasley struggled with fumbles, having lost the ball nine times in the first nine games. He fumbled twice versus Maine, which led fans to chant "Hold That Ball! Hold That Ball!" upon his return to the field. When asked about it, he replied, "That's what makes me mad. I know they're going for the ball. After the fumbles today, I knew I had to concentrate more on what I was doing." He was named again to the weekly all-conference team on November 19, following a performance that included 124 rushing yards and one touchdown.

He finished his career at Delaware with 2,697 career rushing yards, placing him second all-time in team history. He also scored twenty career touchdowns and averaged over 70 yards-per-game.

== Professional career ==
After graduating from college in 1976, Beasley was selected in the 17th round (481st overall) of that year's draft by the Oakland Raiders. He impressed at his first training camp and survived the first wave of roster cuts; however, he was released at cuts in July 1976, ending his professional career.

== Later life and death ==
When the Delaware State Hornets and Delaware Fightin' Blue Hens played a football game against each other for the first time, Beasley was named honorary captain. He was inducted into the Delaware Afro-American Sports Hall of Fame in 2009.

After his sports career Beasley dealt with heart issues and died on March 10, 2010, at the age of 56. He was posthumously inducted into the Delaware Fightin' Blue Hens Hall of Fame.
