= James White (defensive tackle) =

American football player (born 1953)

No. 72
- Position: Defensive tackle

Personal information
- Born: October 26, 1953 (age 73); Hot Springs, Arkansas, U.S.
- Listed height: 6 ft 3 in (1.91 m)
- Listed weight: 265 lb (120 kg)

Career information
- High school: Hot Springs
- College: Oklahoma State
- NFL draft: 1976: 1st round, 25th overall pick

Career history
- Minnesota Vikings (1976–1983)

Career NFL statistics
- Sacks: 26
- Fumble recoveries: 7
- Interceptions: 1
- Stats at Pro Football Reference

James C. "Duck" White (born October 26, 1953) is an American former professional football player who was a defensive tackle for the Minnesota Vikings of the National Football League (NFL) from 1976 to 1983. He played college football at Oklahoma State University where he was their first four-year letterman in the modern era and was the Vikings' first round draft pick in the 1976 NFL draft.
