= 1975–76 NCAA football bowl games =

Series of post-season NCAA football games

- Season: 1975
- Number of bowls: 11
- Bowl games: December 20, 1975 – January 1, 1976
- National Championship: 1976 Orange Bowl
- Location of Championship: Miami Orange Bowl, Miami, Florida
- Champions: Oklahoma
Bowl record by conference
Conference	Bowls	Record	Final AP poll

The 1975–76 NCAA football bowl games were a series of post-season games played in December 1975 and January 1976 to end the 1975 NCAA Division I football season. A total of 11 team-competitive games were played. The post-season began with the Tangerine Bowl on December 20, 1975, and concluded on January 1, 1976, with the Orange Bowl.

== Schedule ==
Date	Game	Site	TV	Teams	Results
Dec. 20	Tangerine Bowl	Orlando Stadium; Orlando, Florida	—	No. 16 Miami (OH) (10–1); South Carolina (7–4)	Miami 20; South Carolina 7
Dec. 22	Liberty Bowl	Liberty Bowl Memorial Stadium; Memphis, Tennessee	ABC	USC (7–4); No. 2 Texas A&M (10–1)	USC 20; Texas A&M 0
Dec. 26	Sun Bowl	Sun Bowl; El Paso, Texas	CBS	No. 20 Pittsburgh (7–4); No. 19 Kansas (7–4)	Pittsburgh 33; Kansas 19
Dec. 26	Fiesta Bowl	Sun Devil Stadium; Tempe, Arizona	CBS	No. 7 Arizona State (11–0); No. 6 Nebraska (10–1)	Arizona State 17; Nebraska 14
Dec. 27	Astro-Bluebonnet Bowl	Astrodome; Houston, Texas	ABC	No. 9 Texas (9–2); No. 10 Colorado (9–2)	Texas 38; Colorado 21
Dec. 29	Gator Bowl	Gator Bowl Stadium; Jacksonville, Florida	ABC	No. 17 Maryland (8–2–1); No. 13 Florida (9–2)	Maryland 13; Florida 0
Dec. 31	Peach Bowl	Fulton County Stadium; Atlanta, Georgia	Mizlou	West Virginia (8–3); NC State (7–3–1)	West Virginia 13; NC State 10
Dec. 31	Sugar Bowl	Louisiana Superdome; New Orleans, Louisiana	ABC	No. 4 Alabama (10–1); No. 8 Penn State (9–2)	Alabama 13; Penn State 6
Jan. 1	Cotton Bowl Classic	Cotton Bowl; Dallas, Texas	CBS	No. 18 Arkansas (9–2); No. 12 Georgia (9–2)	Arkansas 31; Georgia 10
Jan. 1	Rose Bowl	Rose Bowl; Pasadena, California	NBC	No. 11 UCLA (8–2–1); No. 1 Ohio State (11–0)	UCLA 23; Ohio State 10
Jan. 1	Orange Bowl	Miami Orange Bowl; Miami, Florida	NBC	No. 3 Oklahoma (10–1); No. 5 Michigan (8–1–2)	Oklahoma 14; Michigan 6

Rankings from AP Poll
