= Steve Dunlap =

American football player and coach (born 1954)

Biographical details
- Born: February 4, 1954 (age 72); Hurricane, West Virginia, U.S.

Playing career
- 1973–1975: West Virginia
- Position: Linebacker

Coaching career (HC unless noted)
- 1978–1981: West Virginia (GA)
- 1982–1983: Navy (DL)
- 1984–1986: West Virginia (LB)
- 1987–1992: West Virginia (DB)
- 1992–2000: West Virginia (DC)
- 2001: Syracuse (LB)
- 2002–2003: Syracuse (AHC/LB)
- 2004: Syracuse (DC)
- 2005–2006: NC State (DC)
- 2007: Marshall (DC)
- 2008–2012: West Virginia (AHC)

Accomplishments and honors

Awards
- Broyles Award finalist (1996)

Steve Dunlap (born February 4, 1954) is an American former college football coach. He was the assistant head coach and special teams coordinator for the West Virginia Mountaineers football team from 2008 to 2012. Dunlap had been with the Mountaineers on and off throughout his 33-year coaching career on the defensive side of the football. He had served on the staff of 16 bowl teams and coached in the 1989 Fiesta Bowl. His 1996 West Virginia Mountaineers football team defense was ranked No. 1 in the nation.

== Early life and playing years ==
Dunlap received a bachelor's degree from West Virginia University in 1976. There he played as linebacker, and was a three-year letter winner, from 1973 to 1975. Dunlap set the schools records for total tackles in a season (190) and tackles in a single game (28.) He still ranks tenth on the school's career tackle list with 359. He was also a member of the 1975 Peach Bowl team that defeated NC State.
