= 1975 Kentucky Wildcats football team =

1975 University of Kentucky football season

1975 Kentucky Wildcats football
- Conference: Southeastern Conference
- Record: 2–8–1 (0–6 SEC)
- Head coach: Fran Curci (3rd season)
- Offensive coordinator: Jon Mirilovich (3rd season)
- Defensive coordinator: Charlie Bailey (1st season)
- Home stadium: Commonwealth Stadium

1975 Southeastern Conference football standings
	Conf.					Overall
Team	W		L		T	W		L		T
No. 3 Alabama $	6	–	0	–	0	11	–	1	–	0
Florida	5	–	1	–	0	9	–	3	–	0
No. 19 Georgia	5	–	1	–	0	9	–	3	–	0
Ole Miss	5	–	1	–	0	6	–	5	–	0
Tennessee	3	–	3	–	0	7	–	5	–	0
Vanderbilt	2	–	4	–	0	7	–	4	–	0
LSU	2	–	4	–	0	5	–	6	–	0
Auburn	2	–	4	–	0	3	–	6	–	2
Mississippi State	1	–	4	–	1	6	–	4	–	1
Kentucky	0	–	6	–	0	2	–	8	–	1
$ – Conference champion; Mississippi State later forfeited 4 1975 wins and one tie due to NCAA violations.; Rankings from AP Poll

The 1975 Kentucky Wildcats football team represented the University of Kentucky in the Southeastern Conference during the 1975 NCAA Division I football season. The Wildcats scored 132 points while allowing 183 points, finishing 2–8–1 overall, 0–6 in the SEC.

Wally Pesuit and Tom Ranieri were chosen as team captains.

Kentucky opened with a 27–8 home victory against Virginia Tech, then lost 14–10 at home to Kansas, followed by a 10–10 tie at home against Maryland. A road game against Penn State ended in a 10–3 loss, putting Kentucky at 1–2–1 entering SEC play.

Kentucky lost its home conference opener to Auburn, 15–9, and then lost 17–14 at LSU. A 21–13 loss at Georgia was followed by a 23–10 home win against Tulane. A 13–3 road loss at Vanderbilt and 48–7 road loss at Florida led to a 17–13 home loss in the season finale against Tennessee.

The 1975 Kentucky team lost only two games by more than 9 points, and had three losses by 4 or fewer points. The Maryland team that tied Kentucky 10-10 finished the season as the Atlantic Coast Conference champions, with an undefeated record in conference play.

== Schedule ==
Date	Opponent	Site	Result	Attendance	Source
September 13	Virginia Tech*	Commonwealth Stadium; Lexington, KY	W 27–8	56,616	
September 20	Kansas*	Commonwealth Stadium; Lexington, KY	L 10–14	56,467	
September 27	No. 20 Maryland*	Commonwealth Stadium; Lexington, KY	T 10–10	55,000	
October 4	at No. 10 Penn State*	Beaver Stadium; University Park, PA	L 3–10	60,225	
October 11	Auburn	Commonwealth Stadium; Lexington, KY	L 9–15	57,722	
October 18	at LSU	Tiger Stadium; Baton Rouge, LA	L 14–17	61,083	
October 25	at Georgia	Sanford Stadium; Athens, GA	L 13–21	50,000	
November 1	Tulane*	Commonwealth Stadium; Lexington, KY	W 23–10	56,500	
November 8	at Vanderbilt	Dudley Field; Nashville, TN (rivalry)	L 3–13	33,815	
November 15	at No. 14 Florida	Florida Field; Gainesville, FL (rivalry)	L 7–48	59,671	
November 22	Tennessee	Commonwealth Stadium; Lexington, KY (rivalry)	L 13–17	56,000	
*Non-conference game; Rankings from AP Poll released prior to the game

== Roster ==
1975 Kentucky Wildcats football team roster
Players
Coaches
Offense

Pos.	#	Name	Class
OT	69	Warren Bryant	Jr
WR	80	Randy Burke	Jr
RB	41	Steve Campassi	Sr
RB	40	Sonny Collins	Sr
C	53	Thon Dornbrook	Fr
WR	87	Bill Finn	So
G	59	Dan Flower	So
QB	5	John McGrath	Jr
OT	65	Wally Pesuit	Sr
QB	12	Derrick Ramey	So

Defense

Pos.	#	Name	Class
LB	87	Lester Boyd	Fr
DE	97	Art Still	So
DT	83	Bob Winkel	So
LB	51	Michael Emanuel	Sr

Special teams

Pos.	#	Name	Class

Head coach

- Fran Curci

Coordinators/assistant coaches

Legend

- (C) Team captain
- (S) Suspended
- (I) Ineligible
- Injured
- Redshirt

== Team players in the 1976 NFL draft ==
Player	Position	Round	Pick	NFL club
Sonny Collins	Running back	2	36	Atlanta Falcons
Wally Pesuit	Tackle	5	151	Dallas Cowboys
Steve Campassi	Running back	16	439	Philadelphia Eagles
