= 1975 LSU Tigers football team =

American college football season

1975 LSU Tigers football
- Conference: Southeastern Conference
- Record: 5–6 (2–4 SEC)
- Head coach: Charles McClendon (14th season)
- Home stadium: Tiger Stadium

1975 Southeastern Conference football standings
	Conf.					Overall
Team	W		L		T	W		L		T
No. 3 Alabama $	6	–	0	–	0	11	–	1	–	0
Florida	5	–	1	–	0	9	–	3	–	0
No. 19 Georgia	5	–	1	–	0	9	–	3	–	0
Ole Miss	5	–	1	–	0	6	–	5	–	0
Tennessee	3	–	3	–	0	7	–	5	–	0
Vanderbilt	2	–	4	–	0	7	–	4	–	0
LSU	2	–	4	–	0	5	–	6	–	0
Auburn	2	–	4	–	0	3	–	6	–	2
Mississippi State	1	–	4	–	1	6	–	4	–	1
Kentucky	0	–	6	–	0	2	–	8	–	1
$ – Conference champion; Mississippi State later forfeited 4 1975 wins and one tie due to NCAA violations.; Rankings from AP Poll

The 1975 LSU Tigers football team represented Louisiana State University (LSU) as a member of the Southeastern Conference (SEC) during the 1975 NCAA Division I football season. Led by 14th-year head coach Charles McClendon, the Tigers compiled an overall record of 5–6, with a mark of 2–4 in conference play, and finished tied for sixth in the SEC.

LSU suffered its first losing season since 1956 under Paul Dietzel, who led the Tigers to the national championship two years later.

== Schedule ==
Date	Opponent	Site	Result	Attendance	Source
September 13	at No. 6 Nebraska*	Memorial Stadium; Lincoln, NE	L 7–10	76,259	
September 20	No. 11 Texas A&M*	Tiger Stadium; Baton Rouge, LA (rivalry)	L 8–39	69,445	
September 27	vs. Rice*	State Fair Stadium; Shreveport, LA	W 16–13	42,000	
October 4	No. 20 Florida^{†}	Tiger Stadium; Baton Rouge, LA (rivalry)	L 6–34	67,494	
October 11	at No. 19 Tennessee	Neyland Stadium; Knoxville, TN	L 10–24	75,276	
October 18	Kentucky	Tiger Stadium; Baton Rouge, LA	W 17–14	61,083	
October 25	No. 20 South Carolina*	Tiger Stadium; Baton Rouge, LA	W 24–6	61,445	
November 1	at Ole Miss	Mississippi Veterans Memorial Stadium; Jackson, MS (rivalry)	L 13–17	40,438	
November 8	No. 5 Alabama	Tiger Stadium; Baton Rouge, LA (rivalry)	L 10–23	65,047	
November 15	Mississippi State	Tiger Stadium; Baton Rouge, LA (rivalry)	W 6–16 (forfeit)	61,483	
November 22	at Tulane*	Louisiana Superdome; New Orleans, LA (Battle for the Rag)	W 42–6	70,850	
*Non-conference game; ^{†}Homecoming; Rankings from AP Poll released prior to the game

== Roster ==
- RB #4Charles Alexander, Fr.
