= 1975 Clemson Tigers football team =

American college football season

1975 Clemson Tigers football
- Conference: Atlantic Coast Conference
- Record: 2–9 (2–3 ACC)
- Head coach: Red Parker (3rd season)
- Offensive coordinator: Don Murry (2nd season)
- Defensive coordinator: Harold Steelman (2nd season)
- Captains: Bennie Cunningham; Neal Jetton; Dennis Smith; Jimmy Williamson
- Home stadium: Memorial Stadium

1975 Atlantic Coast Conference football standings
	Conf.					Overall
Team	W		L		T	W		L		T
No. 13 Maryland $	5	–	0	–	0	9	–	2	–	1
Duke	3	–	0	–	2	4	–	5	–	2
NC State	2	–	2	–	1	7	–	4	–	1
Wake Forest	3	–	3	–	0	3	–	8	–	0
Clemson	2	–	3	–	0	2	–	9	–	0
North Carolina	1	–	4	–	1	3	–	7	–	1
Virginia	0	–	4	–	0	1	–	10	–	0
$ – Conference champion; Rankings from AP Poll

The 1975 Clemson Tigers football team was an American football team that represented Clemson University in the Atlantic Coast Conference (ACC) during the 1975 NCAA Division I football season. In its fifth season under head coach Red Parker, the team compiled a 2–9 record (2–3 against conference opponents), finished fifth in the ACC, and was outscored by a total of 381 to 177. The team played its home games at Memorial Stadium in Clemson, South Carolina.

Bennie Cunningham, Neal Jetton, Dennis Smith, and Jimmy Williamson were the team captains. The team's statistical leaders included quarterback Willie Jordan with 728 passing yards, running back Ken Callicutt with 572 rushing yards, Craig Brantley with 475 receiving yards, and Mike O'Cain with 36 points (6 touchdowns).

== Schedule ==
Date	Time	Opponent	Site	Result	Attendance	Source
September 13	1:00 p.m.	Tulane*	Memorial Stadium; Clemson, SC	L 13–17	43,106	
September 20	8:30 p.m.	at No. 14 Alabama*	Bryant–Denny Stadium; Tuscaloosa, AL (rivalry)	L 0–56	58,383	
September 27	2:00 p.m.	at Georgia Tech*	Grant Field; Atlanta, GA (rivalry)	L 28–33	46,212–46,282	
October 4	2:00 p.m.	at Georgia*	Sanford Stadium; Athens, GA (rivalry)	L 7–35	57,800	
October 11	1:00 p.m.	Wake Forest	Memorial Stadium; Clemson, SC	W 16–14	43,680	
October 18	1:30 p.m.	at Duke	Wallace Wade Stadium; Durham, NC	L 21–25	31,800	
October 25	1:00 p.m.	NC State	Memorial Stadium; Clemson, SC (rivalry)	L 7–45	42,934	
November 1	1:00 p.m.	Florida State*	Memorial Stadium; Clemson, SC (rivalry)	L 7–43	31,080	
November 8	1:30 p.m.	at North Carolina	Kenan Memorial Stadium; Chapel Hill, NC	W 38–35	40,000	
November 15	1:00 p.m.	Maryland	Memorial Stadium; Clemson, SC	L 20–22	35,073	
November 22	1:30 p.m.	at South Carolina*	Williams–Brice Stadium; Columbia, SC (rivalry)	L 20–56	57,197	
*Non-conference game; Rankings from AP Poll released prior to the game; All times are in Eastern time
