= 1975 Virginia Cavaliers football team =

American college football season

1975 Virginia Cavaliers football
- Conference: Atlantic Coast Conference
- Record: 1–10 (0–4 ACC)
- Head coach: Sonny Randle (2nd season)
- Captains: Scott Gardner; Tom Glassic
- Home stadium: Scott Stadium

1975 Atlantic Coast Conference football standings
	Conf.					Overall
Team	W		L		T	W		L		T
No. 13 Maryland $	5	–	0	–	0	9	–	2	–	1
Duke	3	–	0	–	2	4	–	5	–	2
NC State	2	–	2	–	1	7	–	4	–	1
Wake Forest	3	–	3	–	0	3	–	8	–	0
Clemson	2	–	3	–	0	2	–	9	–	0
North Carolina	1	–	4	–	1	3	–	7	–	1
Virginia	0	–	4	–	0	1	–	10	–	0
$ – Conference champion; Rankings from AP Poll

The 1975 Virginia Cavaliers football team represented the University of Virginia during the 1975 NCAA Division I football season. The Cavaliers were led by second-year head coach Sonny Randle and played their home games at Scott Stadium in Charlottesville, Virginia. They competed as members of the Atlantic Coast Conference, finishing in last. After a 1–10 campaign with many blowout losses, Randle was fired as head coach.

== Schedule ==
Date	Opponent	Site	TV	Result	Attendance	Source
September 13	Navy*	Scott Stadium; Charlottesville, VA		L 14–42	29,740	
September 20	VMI*	Scott Stadium; Charlottesville, VA	ABC	W 22–21	25,176	
September 27	at Duke	Wallace Wade Stadium; Durham, NC		L 11–26	21,750	
October 4	North Carolina	Scott Stadium; Charlottesville, VA (South's Oldest Rivalry)		L 28–31	28,175	
October 11	at South Carolina*	Williams–Brice Stadium; Columbia, SC		L 14–41	51,574	
October 18	at Virginia Tech*	Lane Stadium; Blacksburg, VA (rivalry)		L 17–24	41,000	
October 25	Wake Forest	Scott Stadium; Charlottesville, VA		L 21–66	20,171	
November 1	at Vanderbilt*	Dudley Field; Nashville, TN		L 14–17	21,680	
November 8	East Carolina*^{†}	Scott Stadium; Charlottesville, VA		L 10–61	21,950	
November 15	Syracuse*	Scott Stadium; Charlottesville, VA		L 0–37	17,250	
November 22	at No. 20 Maryland	Byrd Stadium; College Park, MD (rivalry)		L 24–62	44,867	
*Non-conference game; ^{†}Homecoming; Rankings from AP Poll released prior to the game

== Personnel ==
1975 Virginia Cavaliers football team roster
Players			Coaches
Offense: Pos. / # / Name / Class; QB / / Scott Gardner (C) / Sr	Defense: Pos. / # / Name / Class	Special teams: Pos. / # / Name / Class	Head coach: Sonny Randle; Coordinators/assistant coaches Legend: (C) Team captain; (S) Suspended; (I) Ineligible; Injured; Redshirt
