= 1975 Duke Blue Devils football team =

American college football season

1975 Duke Blue Devils football
- Conference: Atlantic Coast Conference
- Record: 4–5–2 (3–0–2 ACC)
- Head coach: Mike McGee (5th season)
- Defensive coordinator: Jerry McGee (4th season)
- MVP: Dave Meier
- Captains: Ernie Clark; Dave Meier; Hal Spears
- Home stadium: Wallace Wade Stadium

1975 Atlantic Coast Conference football standings
| | Conf. | | | | | Overall |
| Team | W | | L | | T | W | | L | | T |
|---|---|---|---|---|---|---|---|---|---|---|
| No. 13 Maryland $ | 5 | – | 0 | – | 0 | 9 | – | 2 | – | 1 |
| Duke | 3 | – | 0 | – | 2 | 4 | – | 5 | – | 2 |
| NC State | 2 | – | 2 | – | 1 | 7 | – | 4 | – | 1 |
| Wake Forest | 3 | – | 3 | – | 0 | 3 | – | 8 | – | 0 |
| Clemson | 2 | – | 3 | – | 0 | 2 | – | 9 | – | 0 |
| North Carolina | 1 | – | 4 | – | 1 | 3 | – | 7 | – | 1 |
| Virginia | 0 | – | 4 | – | 0 | 1 | – | 10 | – | 0 |
$ – Conference champion; Rankings from AP Poll

The 1975 Duke Blue Devils football team was an American football team that represented Duke University as a member of the Atlantic Coast Conference (ACC) during the 1975 NCAA Division I football season. In their fifth year under head coach Mike McGee, the Blue Devils compiled an overall record of 4–5–2, with a conference record of 3–0–2, and finished second in the ACC.

== Schedule ==
| Date | Opponent | Site | Result | Attendance | Source |
|---|---|---|---|---|---|
| September 12 | at No. 4 USC* | Los Angeles Memorial Coliseum; Los Angeles, CA | L 7–35 | 56,727 | |
| September 20 | South Carolina* | Wallace Wade Stadium; Durham, NC | L 16–24 | 21,500 | |
| September 27 | Virginia | Wallace Wade Stadium; Durham, NC | W 26–11 | 21,750 | |
| October 4 | at Pittsburgh* | Pitt Stadium; Pittsburgh, PA | L 0–14 | 33,778 | |
| October 11 | at Army* | Michie Stadium; West Point, NY | W 21–10 | 36,577 | |
| October 18 | Clemson^{†} | Wallace Wade Stadium; Durham, NC | W 25–21 | 31,800 | |
| October 25 | at No. 12 Florida* | Florida Field; Gainesville, FL | L 16–24 | 62,222 | |
| November 1 | at Georgia Tech* | Grant Field; Atlanta, GA | L 16–21 | 44,116 | |
| November 8 | at Wake Forest | Groves Stadium; Winston-Salem, NC (rivalry) | W 42–14 | 28,900 | |
| November 15 | NC State | Wallace Wade Stadium; Durham, NC (rivalry) | T 21–21 | 43,200 | |
| November 22 | North Carolina | Wallace Wade Stadium; Durham, NC (Victory Bell) | T 17–17 | 42,100 | |
*Non-conference game; ^{†}Homecoming; Rankings from AP Poll released prior to the game
