= 1975 Mississippi State Bulldogs football team =

American college football season

1975 Mississippi State Bulldogs football
- Conference: Southeastern Conference
- Record: 6–4–1, 4 wins forfeited, 1 tie forfeited (1–4–1 SEC, 2 wins forfeited, 1 tie forfeited)
- Head coach: Bob Tyler (3rd season)
- Home stadium: Scott Field; Mississippi Veterans Memorial Stadium

1975 Southeastern Conference football standings
	Conf.					Overall
Team	W		L		T	W		L		T
No. 3 Alabama $	6	–	0	–	0	11	–	1	–	0
Florida	5	–	1	–	0	9	–	3	–	0
No. 19 Georgia	5	–	1	–	0	9	–	3	–	0
Ole Miss	5	–	1	–	0	6	–	5	–	0
Tennessee	3	–	3	–	0	7	–	5	–	0
Vanderbilt	2	–	4	–	0	7	–	4	–	0
LSU	2	–	4	–	0	5	–	6	–	0
Auburn	2	–	4	–	0	3	–	6	–	2
Mississippi State	1	–	4	–	1	6	–	4	–	1
Kentucky	0	–	6	–	0	2	–	8	–	1
$ – Conference champion; Mississippi State later forfeited 4 1975 wins and one tie due to NCAA violations.; Rankings from AP Poll

The 1975 Mississippi State Bulldogs football team represented Mississippi State University during the 1975 NCAA Division I football season. The Bulldogs finished 6–4–1 on the field. However, the NCAA later forced them to forfeit four of the wins and the tie due to having played an ineligible player.

== Schedule ==
Date	Opponent	Site	Result	Attendance	Source
September 6	at Memphis State*	Memphis Memorial Stadium; Memphis, TN	W 17–7	45,919	
September 20	at Georgia	Sanford Stadium; Athens, GA	L 6–28	43,500	
September 27	No. 19 Florida	Mississippi Veterans Memorial Stadium; Jackson, MS	L 10–27	38,400	
October 4	Southern Miss*	Scott Field; Starkville, MS	F 7–3 (forfeit)	29,000	
October 11	at Rice*	Rice Stadium; Houston, TX	F 28–14 (forfeit)	18,000	
October 18	North Texas State*	Scott Field; Starkville, MS	W 15–12	32,000	
October 25	at Louisville*	Fairgrounds Stadium; Louisville, KY	F 28–14 (forfeit)	8,636	
November 1	No. 6 Alabama	Mississippi Veterans Memorial Stadium; Jackson, MS (rivalry)	L 10–21	46,000	
November 8	at Auburn	Jordan-Hare Stadium; Auburn, AL	F 21–21 (forfeit)	64,796	
November 15	at LSU	Tiger Stadium; Baton Rouge, LA (rivalry)	F 16–6 (forfeit)	61,483	
November 22	vs. Ole Miss	Mississippi Veterans Memorial Stadium; Jackson, MS (Egg Bowl)	L 7–13	46,500	
*Non-conference game; Rankings from AP Poll released prior to the game

== Roster ==
1975 Mississippi State Bulldogs football team roster
Players
Coaches
Offense

Pos.	#	Name	Class
OT	70	Chuck Brislin	Sr
OT	72	Jim Eidson	Sr
FB	25	Dennis Johnson	So
QB		Norman Joseph	Jr
G	55	Richard Keys	Jr
WR	83	Duncan McKenzie	So
G	53	Duane McNeil	Jr
G	67	Sam Nichols	Jr
RB		Walter Packer
WR	24	Gavin Rees	So
OT	77	Joe Soileau	So
QB	17	Bruce Threadgill	So

Defense

Pos.	#	Name	Class
DB	28	Larry Buie	Sr
DE	43	Will Coltharp	Jr
LB		Ray Costict
DE	94	Wally Cox	Jr
DL		Larry Gillard
DT	99	Harvey Hull	Jr
DT	52	Sidney Key	Sr
DB	16	Willie Lee	Jr
LB	45	Andy Miller	Sr
DL		Raymond Peyton
DL		Perry Tanksley

Special teams

Pos.	#	Name	Class

Head coach

- Bob Tyler

Coordinators/assistant coaches

Legend

- (C) Team captain
- (S) Suspended
- (I) Ineligible
- Injured
- Redshirt
