= 1975 Tennessee Volunteers football team =

American college football season

1975 Tennessee Volunteers football
- Conference: Southeastern Conference
- Record: 7–5 (3–3 SEC)
- Head coach: Bill Battle (6th season)
- Offensive coordinator: Ray Trail
- Defensive coordinator: Larry Jones
- Captain: Ron McCartney
- Home stadium: Neyland Stadium

1975 Southeastern Conference football standings
	Conf.					Overall
Team	W		L		T	W		L		T
No. 3 Alabama $	6	–	0	–	0	11	–	1	–	0
Florida	5	–	1	–	0	9	–	3	–	0
No. 19 Georgia	5	–	1	–	0	9	–	3	–	0
Ole Miss	5	–	1	–	0	6	–	5	–	0
Tennessee	3	–	3	–	0	7	–	5	–	0
Vanderbilt	2	–	4	–	0	7	–	4	–	0
LSU	2	–	4	–	0	5	–	6	–	0
Auburn	2	–	4	–	0	3	–	6	–	2
Mississippi State	1	–	4	–	1	6	–	4	–	1
Kentucky	0	–	6	–	0	2	–	8	–	1
$ – Conference champion; Mississippi State later forfeited 4 1975 wins and one tie due to NCAA violations.; Rankings from AP Poll

The 1975 Tennessee Volunteers football team (variously "Tennessee", "UT" or the "Vols") represented the University of Tennessee in the 1975 NCAA Division I football season. Playing as a member of the Southeastern Conference (SEC), the team was led by head coach Bill Battle, in his sixth year, and played their home games at Neyland Stadium in Knoxville, Tennessee. They finished the season with a record of seven wins and five losses (7–5 overall, 3–3 in the SEC). The Volunteers offense scored 253 points while the defense allowed 193 points.

== Schedule ==
Date	Opponent	Rank	Site	TV	Result	Attendance	Source
September 13	No. 14 Maryland*	No. 20	Neyland Stadium; Knoxville, TN		W 26–8	74,161	
September 20	at No. 12 UCLA*	No. 10	Los Angeles Memorial Coliseum; Los Angeles, CA	ABC	L 28–34	33,356	
September 27	Auburn	No. 16	Neyland Stadium; Knoxville, TN		W 21–17	74,611	
October 11	LSU	No. 19	Neyland Stadium; Knoxville, TN		W 24–10	75,276	
October 18	at No. 6 Alabama	No. 16	Legion Field; Birmingham, AL (Third Saturday in October)		L 7–30	72,000	
October 25	North Texas State*		Neyland Stadium; Knoxville, TN		L 14–21	72,670	
November 1	Colorado State*		Neyland Stadium; Knoxville, TN		W 28–7	71,579	
November 8	Utah*^{†}		Neyland Stadium; Knoxville, TN		W 40–7	67,437	
November 15	vs. Ole Miss		Memphis Memorial Stadium; Memphis, TN (rivalry)		L 6–23	51,389	
November 22	at Kentucky		Commonwealth Stadium; Lexington, KY (Battle for the Barrel)		W 17–13	56,000	
November 29	Vanderbilt		Neyland Stadium; Knoxville, TN		L 14–17	71,943	
December 6	at Hawaii*		Aloha Stadium; Halawa, HI		W 28–6	40,585	
*Non-conference game; ^{†}Homecoming; Rankings from AP Poll released prior to the game

== Roster ==
1975 Tennessee Volunteers football team roster
Players
Coaches
Offense

Pos.	#	Name	Class
OT	59	Dave Brady	Jr
OT	79	Mike Caldwell	Sr
WR	81	Tim Fitchpatrick	Sr
G	78	Joe Gallagher	Jr
C	52	Paul Johnson	Sr
G	67	Mickey Marvin	Jr
RB	21	Stanley Morgan	Jr
RB	44	Craig Puki	Fr
QB	5	Gary Roach	So
WR	89	Larry Seivers	Jr
C	56	Robert Shaw	Fr
G	68	Gary Carr	So
QB	6	Randy Wallace	Jr
OT	62	Brent Watson	So
TE	23	Tommy West	Sr
WR	17	John Yarbrough	Sr

Defense

Pos.	#	Name	Class
DB	14	Bill Cole	Sr
DE	39	Kevin Davis	Jr
DB	10	Mike Mauck	Jr
DE	57	Ron McCartney	Sr
DT	72	David Page	Sr
DB	30	David Parsons	Jr
LB	45	Steve Poole	Sr
DB	29	Russ Rabenstein	Sr
LB	50	Andy Spiva	Jr
DB	40	Ernie Ward	Sr
DT	71	Jim Woofter	Jr

Special teams

Pos.	#	Name	Class
P	18	Craig Colquitt	So

Head coach

- Bill Battle

Coordinators/assistant coaches

Legend

- (C) Team captain
- (S) Suspended
- (I) Ineligible
- Injured
- Redshirt

== Team players drafted into the NFL ==
Player	Position	Round	Pick	NFL club
Ron McCartney	Linebacker	2	53	Los Angeles Rams
Tommy West	Linebacker	16	433	Tampa Bay Buccaneers
