= 1975 Wake Forest Demon Deacons football team =

American college football season

1975 Wake Forest Demon Deacons football
- Conference: Atlantic Coast Conference
- Record: 3–8 (3–3 ACC)
- Head coach: Chuck Mills (3rd season)
- Captains: Doug Benfield; Clark Gaines; Lew Henderson
- Home stadium: Groves Stadium

1975 Atlantic Coast Conference football standings
	Conf.					Overall
Team	W		L		T	W		L		T
No. 13 Maryland $	5	–	0	–	0	9	–	2	–	1
Duke	3	–	0	–	2	4	–	5	–	2
NC State	2	–	2	–	1	7	–	4	–	1
Wake Forest	3	–	3	–	0	3	–	8	–	0
Clemson	2	–	3	–	0	2	–	9	–	0
North Carolina	1	–	4	–	1	3	–	7	–	1
Virginia	0	–	4	–	0	1	–	10	–	0
$ – Conference champion; Rankings from AP Poll

The 1975 Wake Forest Demon Deacons football team was an American football team that represented Wake Forest University during the 1975 NCAA Division I football season. In their third season under head coach Chuck Mills, the Demon Deacons compiled a 3–8 record and finished in fourth place in the Atlantic Coast Conference.

== Schedule ==
Date	Opponent	Site	Result	Attendance	Source
September 6	SMU*	Groves Stadium; Winston-Salem, NC	L 7–14	13,400	
September 13	at No. 15 NC State	Carter Stadium; Raleigh, NC (rivalry)	W 30–22	36,500	
September 20	Appalachian State*	Groves Stadium; Winston-Salem, NC	L 17–19	24,300	
September 27	Kansas State*	Groves Stadium; Winston-Salem, NC	L 16–17	17,700	
October 11	at Clemson	Memorial Stadium; Clemson, South Carolina	L 14–16	43,680	
October 18	No. 19 Maryland	Groves Stadium; Winston-Salem, NC	L 0–27	19,300	
October 25	at Virginia	Scott Stadium; Charlottesville, VA	W 66–21	20,171	
November 1	at North Carolina	Kenan Memorial Stadium; Chapel Hill, NC (rivalry)	W 21–9	43,000	
November 8	Duke	Groves Stadium; Winston-Salem, North Carolina (rivalry)	L 14–42	28,900	
November 15	at South Carolina*	Williams–Brice Stadium; Columbia, SC	L 26–37	37,656	
November 22	at Virginia Tech*	Lane Stadium; Blacksburg, VA	L 10–40	29,000	
*Non-conference game; Rankings from AP Poll released prior to the game

== Team leaders ==
Category	Team Leader	Att/Cth	Yds
Passing	Jerry McManus	77/152	950
Rushing	Clark Gaines	238	929
Receiving	Bill Millner	28	327
