= 1975 Ole Miss Rebels football team =

American college football season

1975 Ole Miss Rebels football
- Conference: Southeastern Conference
- Record: 6–5 (5–1 SEC)
- Head coach: Ken Cooper (2nd season)
- Home stadium: Hemingway Stadium; Mississippi Veterans Memorial Stadium

1975 Southeastern Conference football standings
| | Conf. | | | | | Overall |
| Team | W | | L | | T | W | | L | | T |
|---|---|---|---|---|---|---|---|---|---|---|
| No. 3 Alabama $ | 6 | – | 0 | – | 0 | 11 | – | 1 | – | 0 |
| Florida | 5 | – | 1 | – | 0 | 9 | – | 3 | – | 0 |
| No. 19 Georgia | 5 | – | 1 | – | 0 | 9 | – | 3 | – | 0 |
| Ole Miss | 5 | – | 1 | – | 0 | 6 | – | 5 | – | 0 |
| Tennessee | 3 | – | 3 | – | 0 | 7 | – | 5 | – | 0 |
| Vanderbilt | 2 | – | 4 | – | 0 | 7 | – | 4 | – | 0 |
| LSU | 2 | – | 4 | – | 0 | 5 | – | 6 | – | 0 |
| Auburn | 2 | – | 4 | – | 0 | 3 | – | 6 | – | 2 |
| Mississippi State | 1 | – | 4 | – | 1 | 6 | – | 4 | – | 1 |
| Kentucky | 0 | – | 6 | – | 0 | 2 | – | 8 | – | 1 |
$ – Conference champion; Mississippi State later forfeited 4 1975 wins and one tie due to NCAA violations.; Rankings from AP Poll

The 1975 Ole Miss Rebels football team represented the University of Mississippi (Ole Miss) in the 1975 NCAA Division I football season. The Rebels were led by second-year head coach Ken Cooper and played their home games at Hemingway Stadium in Oxford, Mississippi and Mississippi Veterans Memorial Stadium in Jackson. The team competed as members of the Southeastern Conference, finishing in a three-way tie for second place with a conference record of 5–1. This was a significant improvement over the previous year, as the team went winless in conference in 1974.

== Schedule ==
| Date | Opponent | Site | Result | Attendance | Source |
|---|---|---|---|---|---|
| September 6 | at Baylor* | Baylor Stadium; Waco, TX | L 10–20 | 36,400 | |
| September 13 | at No. 8 Texas A&M* | Kyle Field; College Station, TX | L 0–7 | 41,021 | |
| September 20 | at Tulane* | Louisiana Superdome; New Orleans, LA (rivalry) | L 3–14 | 50,500 | |
| September 27 | Southern Miss* | Hemingway Stadium; Oxford, MS | W 24–8 | 26,700 | |
| October 4 | at No. 9 Alabama | Legion Field; Birmingham, AL (rivalry) | L 6–32 | 70,000 | |
| October 11 | Georgia | Hemingway Stadium; Oxford, MS | W 28–13 | 31,200 | |
| October 18 | South Carolina* | Mississippi Veterans Memorial Stadium; Jackson, MS | L 29–35 | 30,107 | |
| October 25 | Vanderbilt | Hemingway Stadium; Oxford, MS (rivalry) | W 17–7 | 20,310 | |
| November 1 | LSU | Mississippi Veterans Memorial Stadium; Jackson, MS (rivalry) | W 17–13 | 40,438 | |
| November 15 | vs. Tennessee | Memphis Memorial Stadium; Memphis, TN (rivalry) | W 23–6 | 51,389 | |
| November 22 | vs. Mississippi State | Mississippi Veterans Memorial Stadium; Jackson, MS (Egg Bowl) | W 13–7 | 46,500 | |
*Non-conference game; Rankings from AP Poll released prior to the game
