= 1975 North Carolina Tar Heels football team =

American college football season

1975 North Carolina Tar Heels football
- Conference: Atlantic Coast Conference
- Record: 3–7–1 (1–4–1 ACC)
- Head coach: Bill Dooley (9th season)
- Defensive coordinator: Jim Dickey (1st season)
- Captains: Deke Andrews; Roc Bauman; James Betterson; Bill Paschall; Ray Stanford; Bobby Trott
- Home stadium: Kenan Memorial Stadium

1975 Atlantic Coast Conference football standings
| | Conf. | | | | | Overall |
| Team | W | | L | | T | W | | L | | T |
|---|---|---|---|---|---|---|---|---|---|---|
| No. 13 Maryland $ | 5 | – | 0 | – | 0 | 9 | – | 2 | – | 1 |
| Duke | 3 | – | 0 | – | 2 | 4 | – | 5 | – | 2 |
| NC State | 2 | – | 2 | – | 1 | 7 | – | 4 | – | 1 |
| Wake Forest | 3 | – | 3 | – | 0 | 3 | – | 8 | – | 0 |
| Clemson | 2 | – | 3 | – | 0 | 2 | – | 9 | – | 0 |
| North Carolina | 1 | – | 4 | – | 1 | 3 | – | 7 | – | 1 |
| Virginia | 0 | – | 4 | – | 0 | 1 | – | 10 | – | 0 |
$ – Conference champion; Rankings from AP Poll

The 1975 North Carolina Tar Heels football team represented the University of North Carolina at Chapel Hill during the 1975 NCAA Division I football season. The Tar Heels were led by ninth-year head coach Bill Dooley and played their home games at Kenan Memorial Stadium in Chapel Hill, North Carolina. They competed as members of the Atlantic Coast Conference, finishing in sixth.

== Schedule ==
| Date | Time | Opponent | Site | Result | Attendance | Source |
|---|---|---|---|---|---|---|
| September 6 | 1:30 p.m. | William & Mary* | Kenan Memorial Stadium; Chapel Hill, NC | W 33–7 | 31,500 | |
| September 20 | 1:30 p.m. | Maryland | Kenan Memorial Stadium; Chapel Hill, NC | L 7–34 | 43,000 | |
| September 27 | 1:30 p.m. | at No. 2 Ohio State* | Ohio Stadium; Columbus, OH | L 7–32 | 87,750 | |
| October 4 | 1:30 p.m. | at Virginia | Scott Stadium; Charlottesville, VA (South's Oldest Rivalry) | W 31–28 | 28,175 | |
| October 11 | 1:30 p.m. | No. 15 Notre Dame* | Kenan Memorial Stadium; Chapel Hill, NC (rivalry) | L 14–21 | 49,500 | |
| October 18 | 1:30 p.m. | at NC State | Carter Stadium; Raleigh, NC (rivalry) | L 20–21 | 50,500 | |
| October 25 | 1:30 p.m. | East Carolina* | Kenan Memorial Stadium; Chapel Hill, NC | L 17–38 | 42,000 | |
| November 1 | 1:30 p.m. | Wake Forest | Kenan Memorial Stadium; Chapel Hill, NC (rivalry) | L 9–21 | 43,000 | |
| November 8 | 1:30 p.m. | Clemson | Kenan Memorial Stadium; Chapel Hill, NC | L 35–38 | 40,000 | |
| November 15 | 1:30 p.m. | at Tulane* | Louisiana Superdome; New Orleans, LA | W 17–15 | 29,850 | |
| November 22 | 1:30 p.m. | at Duke | Wallace Wade Stadium; Durham, NC (Victory Bell) | T 17–17 | 42,100 | |
*Non-conference game; Rankings from AP Poll released prior to the game; All times are in Eastern time
