= 1975 Vanderbilt Commodores football team =

American college football season

1975 Vanderbilt Commodores football
- Conference: Southeastern Conference
- Record: 7–4 (2–4 SEC)
- Head coach: Fred Pancoast (1st season)
- Offensive coordinator: Richard Trail (1st season)
- Defensive coordinator: Frank Emanuel (1st season)
- Captains: Lonnie Sadler; Tom Galbierz
- Home stadium: Dudley Field

1975 Southeastern Conference football standings
	Conf.					Overall
Team	W		L		T	W		L		T
No. 3 Alabama $	6	–	0	–	0	11	–	1	–	0
Florida	5	–	1	–	0	9	–	3	–	0
No. 19 Georgia	5	–	1	–	0	9	–	3	–	0
Ole Miss	5	–	1	–	0	6	–	5	–	0
Tennessee	3	–	3	–	0	7	–	5	–	0
Vanderbilt	2	–	4	–	0	7	–	4	–	0
LSU	2	–	4	–	0	5	–	6	–	0
Auburn	2	–	4	–	0	3	–	6	–	2
Mississippi State	1	–	4	–	1	6	–	4	–	1
Kentucky	0	–	6	–	0	2	–	8	–	1
$ – Conference champion; Mississippi State later forfeited 4 1975 wins and one tie due to NCAA violations.; Rankings from AP Poll

The 1975 Vanderbilt Commodores football team represented Vanderbilt University in the 1975 NCAA Division I football season. The team was led by head coach Fred Pancoast, who replaced Steve Sloan. In 1974, Sloan had led Vanderbilt to a bowl game for the first time since 1955, before leaving to become head coach at Texas Tech, the team Vanderbilt had faced in the Peach Bowl to close the season. The Vanderbilt squad finished the season with a record of 7–4, but was not invited to a bowl game. Three of the Commodores's four defeats came by margins of more than 30 points while all seven of their victors were by ten or fewer points.

Vanderbilt defeated Rice, Tulane, Army, Chattanooga, Kentucky, Virginia, and Tennessee. The Commodores lost to Georgia, Alabama, Florida, and Ole Miss. Vanderbilt started off with three wins and four losses before winning their last four games of the season including the regular season finale against rival Tennessee. Vanderbilt's final record was 7–4 with a mark of 2–4 in the SEC.

== Schedule ==
Date	Opponent	Site	Result	Attendance	Source
September 13	Chattanooga*	Dudley Field; Nashville, TN	W 17–7	24,108	
September 20	at Rice*	Rice Stadium; Houston, TX	W 9–6	18,000	
September 27	No. 11 Alabama	Dudley Field; Nashville, TN	L 7–40	34,000	
October 4	at Tulane*	Louisiana Superdome; New Orleans, LA	W 6–3	30,100	
October 11	at No. 18 Florida	Florida Field; Gainesville, FL	L 0–35	58,631	
October 18	Georgia	Dudley Field; Nashville, TN (rivalry)	L 3–47	20,538	
October 25	at Ole Miss	Hemingway Stadium; Oxford, MS (rivalry)	L 7–17	20,310	
November 1	Virginia*	Dudley Field; Nashville, TN	W 17–14	21,680	
November 8	Kentucky	Dudley Field; Nashville, TN (rivalry)	W 13–3	33,815	
November 15	Army*	Dudley Field; Nashville, TN	W 23–14	20,315	
November 29	at Tennessee	Neyland Stadium; Knoxville, TN (rivalry)	W 17–14	71,943	
*Non-conference game; Rankings from AP Poll released prior to the game

== Roster ==
1975 Vanderbilt Commodores football team roster
Players
Coaches
Offense

Pos.	#	Name	Class
G	62	Tom Ballman	Jr
TE	89	Barry Burton	Sr
WR	1	Martin Cox	So
QB	10	David Culley	So
QB	12	Fred Fisher	Sr
OT	77	Matt Gossage	Sr
OT	64	David Harber	Sr
C	50	Bill Holby	Sr

Defense

Pos.	#	Name	Class
CB	20	Reggie Calvin	So
SS	7	Jay Chesley	Sr
CB	21	Steve Curnette	Sr
DT	54	Tom Galbierz	Sr
DT	77	Dennis Harrison	So

Special teams

Pos.	#	Name	Class

Head coach

- Fred Pancoast

Coordinators/assistant coaches

Legend

- (C) Team captain
- (S) Suspended
- (I) Ineligible
- Injured
- Redshirt

== Team players drafted into the NFL ==
Player	Position	Round	Pick	NFL club
Jay Chesley	Defensive back	7	194	San Francisco 49ers
