= 1975 Tulane Green Wave football team =

American college football season

1975 Tulane Green Wave football
- Conference: Independent
- Record: 4–7
- Head coach: Bennie Ellender (5th season)
- Home stadium: Louisiana Superdome

1975 NCAA Division I independents football records
	Conf.			Overall
Team	W	L	T	W		L		T
Rutgers		–		9	–	2	–	0
No. 10 Penn State		–		9	–	3	–	0
No. 20 West Virginia		–		9	–	3	–	0
Notre Dame		–		8	–	3	–	0
Virginia Tech		–		8	–	3	–	0
No. 15 Pittsburgh		–		8	–	4	–	0
Boston College		–		7	–	4	–	0
Georgia Tech		–		7	–	4	–	0
Memphis State		–		7	–	4	–	0
Navy		–		7	–	4	–	0
North Texas State		–		7	–	4	–	0
Southern Miss		–		7	–	4	–	0
South Carolina		–		7	–	5	–	0
Colgate		–		6	–	4	–	0
Cincinnati		–		6	–	5	–	0
Hawaii		–		6	–	5	–	0
Syracuse		–		6	–	5	–	0
Temple		–		6	–	5	–	0
Utah State		–		6	–	5	–	0
Dayton		–		5	–	6	–	0
Northeast Louisiana		–		4	–	6	–	1
Tulane		–		4	–	7	–	0
Villanova		–		4	–	7	–	0
Florida State		–		3	–	8	–	0
Air Force		–		2	–	8	–	1
Houston		–		2	–	8	–	0
Miami (FL)		–		2	–	8	–	0
Army		–		2	–	9	–	0
Marshall		–		2	–	9	–	0
Southern Illinois		–		1	–	9	–	1
Holy Cross		–		1	–	10	–	0
Louisville		–		1	–	10	–	0
Rankings from AP Poll

The 1975 Tulane Green Wave football team was an American football team that represented Tulane University during the 1975 NCAA Division I football season as an independent. In their fifth year under head coach Bennie Ellender, the team compiled a 4–7 record.

== Schedule ==
Date	Opponent	Site	Result	Attendance	Source
September 13	at Clemson	Memorial Stadium; Clemson, SC	W 17–13	43,106	
September 20	Ole Miss	Louisiana Superdome; New Orleans, LA (rivalry)	W 14–3	50,500	
September 27	Syracuse	Louisiana Superdome; New Orleans, LA	L 13–31	33,200	
October 4	Vanderbilt	Louisiana Superdome; New Orleans, LA	L 3–6	30,100	
October 11	at Boston College	Alumni Stadium; Chestnut Hill, MA	W 17–7	11,775	
October 18	at West Virginia	Mountaineer Field; Morgantown, WV	W 16–14	33,842	
October 25	Georgia Tech	Louisiana Superdome; New Orleans, LA	L 0–23	63,333	
November 1	at Kentucky	Commonwealth Stadium; Lexington, KY	L 10–23	56,500	
November 8	Air Force	Louisiana Superdome; New Orleans, LA	L 12–13	31,790	
November 15	North Carolina	Louisiana Superdome; New Orleans, LA	L 15–17	29,850	
November 22	LSU	Louisiana Superdome; New Orleans, LA (Battle for the Rag)	L 6–42	70,850	

== Roster ==
1975 Tulane Green Wave football team roster
Players			Coaches
Offense: Pos. / # / Name / Class; OT / / Eric Laakso / So	Defense: Pos. / # / Name / Class; LB / / Jim Gueno / Sr	Special teams: Pos. / # / Name / Class	Head coach: Bennie Ellender; Coordinators/assistant coaches Legend: (C) Team captain; (S) Suspended; (I) Ineligible; Injured; Redshirt
