= 1975 Alabama Crimson Tide football team =

American college football season

1975 Alabama Crimson Tide football

National champion (Mathews Grid) SEC champion Sugar Bowl champion

Sugar Bowl, W 13–6 vs. Penn State
- Conference: Southeastern Conference

Ranking
- Coaches: No. 3
- AP: No. 3
- Record: 11–1 (6–0 SEC)
- Head coach: Bear Bryant (18th season)
- Offensive coordinator: Mal Moore (1st season)
- Offensive scheme: Wishbone
- Defensive coordinator: Ken Donahue (2nd season)
- Base defense: 5–2
- Captains: Leroy Cook; Richard Todd
- Home stadium: Denny Stadium; Legion Field

1975 Southeastern Conference football standings
	Conf.					Overall
Team	W		L		T	W		L		T
No. 3 Alabama $	6	–	0	–	0	11	–	1	–	0
Florida	5	–	1	–	0	9	–	3	–	0
No. 19 Georgia	5	–	1	–	0	9	–	3	–	0
Ole Miss	5	–	1	–	0	6	–	5	–	0
Tennessee	3	–	3	–	0	7	–	5	–	0
Vanderbilt	2	–	4	–	0	7	–	4	–	0
LSU	2	–	4	–	0	5	–	6	–	0
Auburn	2	–	4	–	0	3	–	6	–	2
Mississippi State	1	–	4	–	1	6	–	4	–	1
Kentucky	0	–	6	–	0	2	–	8	–	1
$ – Conference champion; Mississippi State later forfeited 4 1975 wins and one tie due to NCAA violations.; Rankings from AP Poll

The 1975 Alabama Crimson Tide football team (variously "Alabama", "UA" or "Bama") represented the University of Alabama in the 1975 NCAA Division I football season. It was the Crimson Tide's 81st overall and 42nd season as a member of the Southeastern Conference (SEC). The team was led by head coach Bear Bryant, in his 18th year, and played their home games at Denny Stadium in Tuscaloosa and Legion Field in Birmingham, Alabama. They finished season with eleven wins and one loss (11–1 overall, 6–0 in the SEC), as SEC champions and with a victory over Penn State in the Sugar Bowl.

The 1975 squad entered the season with the No. 2 ranking in the AP Poll and as one of the favorites to compete for the national championship. Their championship hopes were dashed after they were upset by an unranked Missouri team in their season opener at Legion Field. Although Alabama dropped into the No. 14 position prior to their second game against Clemson, they would not lose another game during the season as they climbed up the polls back into a top five position by season's end.

After their shutout over Clemson, Alabama traveled to Nashville in the first road game of the season where they defeated Vanderbilt. The Crimson Tide then returned to Birmingham and defeated Ole Miss the week before their victory over Washington in the first meeting between the schools since the 1926 Rose Bowl. They followed this with wins over Tennessee, TCU, Mississippi State, LSU and Southern Miss on homecoming in Tuscaloosa. The Crimson Tide then closed the season with wins against Auburn in what was Ralph Jordan's final game as the Tigers' head coach and Penn State in the Sugar Bowl that ended an eight-game winless streak (0–7–1) in bowl games, and started a bowl winning streak that went six years.

== Schedule ==
Date	Opponent	Rank	Site	TV	Result	Attendance
September 8	Missouri*	No. 2	Legion Field; Birmingham, AL	ABC	L 7–20	63,000
September 20	Clemson*	No. 14	Denny Stadium; Tuscaloosa, AL (rivalry)		W 56–0	58,383
September 27	at Vanderbilt	No. 11	Dudley Field; Nashville, TN		W 40–7	34,000
October 4	Ole Miss	No. 9	Legion Field; Birmingham, AL (rivalry)		W 32–6	70,000
October 11	Washington*	No. 7	Denny Stadium; Tuscaloosa, AL		W 52–0	58,000
October 18	No. 16 Tennessee	No. 6	Legion Field; Birmingham, AL (Third Saturday in October)		W 30–7	72,000
October 25	TCU*	No. 6	Legion Field; Birmingham, AL		W 45–0	52,000
November 1	at Mississippi State	No. 6	Mississippi Veterans Memorial Stadium; Jackson, MS (rivalry)		W 21–10	46,000
November 8	at LSU	No. 5	Tiger Stadium; Baton Rouge, LA (rivalry)		W 23–10	65,047
November 15	Southern Miss*^{†}	No. 5	Denny Stadium; Tuscaloosa, AL		W 27–6	58,000
November 29	vs. Auburn	No. 4	Legion Field; Birmingham, AL (Iron Bowl)	ABC	W 28–0	63,500
December 31	vs. No. 8 Penn State*	No. 4	Louisiana Superdome; New Orleans, LA (Sugar Bowl, rivalry)	ABC	W 13–6	75,212
*Non-conference game; ^{†}Homecoming; Rankings from AP Poll released prior to the game

== Game summaries ==
=== Missouri ===
Team	1	2	3	4	Total
• Missouri	10	10	0	0	20
#2 Alabama	0	0	0	7	7

- Date: September 8
- Location: Legion Field
  Birmingham, Alabama
- Game attendance: 63,000

Scoring summary
1	Missouri	Tony Galbreath 3-yard run (Timothy Gibbons kick)	Missouri 7–0
1	Missouri	Timothy Gibbons 44-yard field goal	Missouri 10–0
2	Missouri	John Blakeman 9-yard run (Timothy Gibbons kick)	Missouri 17–0
2	Missouri	Timothy Gibbons 46-yard field goal	Missouri 20–0
4	Alabama	Ozzie Newsome 14-yard pass from Richard Todd (Danny Ridgeway kick)	Missouri 20–7

As they entered their first game of the 1975 season, Alabama was ranked as the nations No. 2 team prior to their Monday night game against Missouri. Before a nationally televised audience, the Crimson Tide fell behind to the Tigers 20–0 at halftime and were ultimately defeated 20–7 in the first major upset of the season.

=== Clemson ===
Team	1	2	3	4	Total
Clemson	0	0	0	0	0
• #14 Alabama	16	19	7	14	56

- Date: September 20
- Location: Denny Stadium
  Tuscaloosa, Alabama
- Game attendance: 58,383

Scoring summary
1	Alabama	John Prudhomme blocked punt for safety	Alabama 2–0
1	Alabama	Mike Stock 3-yard run (Danny Ridgeway kick)	Alabama 9–0
1	Alabama	Calvin Culliver 16-yard run (Danny Ridgeway kick)	Alabama 16–0
2	Alabama	John Boles 2-yard run (Danny Ridgeway kick failed)	Alabama 22–0
2	Alabama	Johnny Davis 18-yard run (Danny Ridgeway kick)	Alabama 29–0
2	Alabama	Willie Shelby 1-yard run (Danny Ridgeway kick failed)	Alabama 35–0
3	Alabama	Willie Shelby 15-yard run (Danny Ridgeway kick)	Alabama 42–0
4	Alabama	John Boles 5-yard run (Danny Ridgeway kick)	Alabama 49–0
4	Alabama	Rick Watson 3-yard run (Danny Ridgeway kick)	Alabama 56–0

After their loss against Missouri, the Crimson Tide had a bye prior their game against Clemson, and entered the contest as the No. 14 team prior to their game against the Tigers. At Denny Stadium, Alabama ran for 437 yards and eight touchdowns in this 56–0 shutout of Clemson.

=== Vanderbilt ===
Team	1	2	3	4	Total
• #11 Alabama	10	10	6	14	40
Vanderbilt	0	0	7	0	7

- Date: September 27
- Location: Dudley Field
  Nashville, Tennessee
- Game attendance: 34,000

Scoring summary
1	Alabama	Danny Ridgeway 21-yard field goal	Alabama 3–0
1	Alabama	Mike Stock 8-yard pass from Richard Todd (Danny Ridgeway kick)	Alabama 10–0
2	Alabama	James Taylor 17-yard run (Danny Ridgeway kick)	Alabama 17–0
2	Alabama	Bucky Berrey 28-yard field goal	Alabama 20–0
3	Alabama	Bucky Berrey 29-yard field goal	Alabama 23–0
3	Vanderbilt	Fred Fisher 1-yard run (Mark Adams kick)	Alabama 23–7
3	Alabama	Bucky Berrey 31-yard field goal	Alabama 26–7
4	Alabama	Calvin Culliver 46-yard run (Bucky Berrey kick)	Alabama 33–7
4	Alabama	Robert Fraley 56-yard run (Bucky Berrey kick)	Alabama 40–7

After their victory over Clemson, Alabama moved into the No. 11 position in the AP Poll prior to their game against Vanderbilt. In their first road game of the season, the Crimson Tide score on their first four possession en route to a 40–7 victory over the Commodores at Nashville.

=== Ole Miss ===
Team	1	2	3	4	Total
Ole Miss	0	0	0	6	6
• #9 Alabama	0	16	6	10	32

- Date: October 4
- Location: Legion Field
  Birmingham, Alabama
- Game attendance: 70,000

Scoring summary
2	Alabama	Bucky Berrey 29-yard field goal	Alabama 3–0
2	Alabama	Willie Shelby 4-yard run (Bucky Berrey kick)	Alabama 10–0
2	Alabama	James Taylor 1-yard run (Bucky Berrey kick failed)	Alabama 16–0
3	Alabama	Johnny Davis 1-yard run (2-point pass failed)	Alabama 22–0
4	Alabama	Bucky Berrey 42-yard field goal	Alabama 25–0
2	Alabama	Donald Faust 2-yard run (Bucky Berrey kick)	Alabama 32–0
4	Ole Miss	Michael Sweet 1-yard pass from Tim Ellis (2-point pass failed)	Alabama 32–6

After their victory over Vanderbilt, Alabama moved into the No. 9 position in the AP Poll prior to their game against Ole Miss at Legion Field. Against the Rebels, the Crimson Tide scored twice in a 0:44 span early in the game en route to a 32–6 victory at Birmingham.

=== Washington ===
Team	1	2	3	4	Total
Washington	0	0	0	0	0
• #7 Alabama	24	14	14	0	52

- Date: October 11
- Location: Denny Stadium
  Tuscaloosa, Alabama
- Game attendance: 58,000

Scoring summary
1	Alabama	Richard Todd 8-yard run (Danny Ridgeway kick)	Alabama 7–0
1	Alabama	Willie Shelby 84-yard punt return (Danny Ridgeway kick)	Alabama 14–0
1	Alabama	Johnny Davis 31-yard run (Danny Ridgeway kick)	Alabama 21–0
1	Alabama	Danny Ridgeway 22-yard field goal	Alabama 24–0
2	Alabama	Ozzie Newsome 28-yard pass from Robert Fraley (Danny Ridgeway kick)	Alabama 31–0
2	Alabama	Tony Nathan 2-yard run (Danny Ridgeway kick)	Alabama 38–0
3	Alabama	Johnny Davis 51-yard run (Danny Ridgeway kick)	Alabama 45–0
3	Alabama	Johnny Davis 6-yard run (Danny Ridgeway kick)	Alabama 52–0

After their victory over Ole Miss, Alabama moved into the No. 7 position in the AP Poll prior to their non-conference game against Washington. Playing the Huskies for the first time since the 1926 Rose Bowl, Alabama had 496 yards of total offense and seven touchdowns in this 52–0 shutout of Washington.

=== Tennessee ===
Third Saturday in October

Team	1	2	3	4	Total
#16 Tennessee	0	7	0	0	7
• #6 Alabama	7	6	10	7	30

- Date: October 18
- Location: Legion Field
  Birmingham, Alabama
- Game attendance: 72,000

Scoring summary
1	Alabama	Richard Todd 4-yard run (Danny Ridgeway kick)	Alabama 7–0
2	Alabama	Richard Todd 1-yard run (Danny Ridgeway kick failed)	Alabama 13–0
2	Tennessee	Larry Seivers 29-yard pass from Randy Wallace (Jim Gaylor kick)	Alabama 13–7
3	Alabama	Bucky Berrey 44-yard field goal	Alabama 16–7
3	Alabama	Richard Todd 9-yard run (Danny Ridgeway kick)	Alabama 23–7
4	Alabama	Jerry Brown 9-yard pass from Richard Todd (Danny Ridgeway kick)	Alabama 30–7

After their blowout victory over Washington, Alabama moved into the No. 6 position prior to their game against Tennessee. Against the Volunteers, Richard Todd ran for three and threw for a fourth touchdown in this 30–7 victory at Legion Field.

=== TCU ===
Team	1	2	3	4	Total
TCU	0	0	0	0	0
• #6 Alabama	7	14	24	0	45

- Date: October 25
- Location: Legion Field
  Birmingham, Alabama
- Game attendance: 52,000

Scoring summary
1	Alabama	Johnny Davis 66-yard run (Danny Ridgeway kick)	Alabama 7–0
2	Alabama	Robert Fraley 1-yard run (Danny Ridgeway kick)	Alabama 14–0
2	Alabama	Richard Todd 1-yard run (Danny Ridgeway kick)	Alabama 21–0
3	Alabama	Richard Todd 37-yard run (Danny Ridgeway kick)	Alabama 28–0
3	Alabama	Jeff Rutledge 1-yard run (Danny Ridgeway kick)	Alabama 35–0
3	Alabama	Danny Ridgeway 23-yard field goal	Alabama 38–0
3	Alabama	George Pugh 7-yard pass from Jeff Rutledge (Danny Ridgeway kick)	Alabama 45–0

After their victory over Tennessee, Alabama retained their No. 6 position prior to their match-up against Texas Christian University (TCU) of the Southwest Conference at Legion Field. Against the Horned Frogs, Alabama posted its third shutout of the season with this 45–0 victory over TCU.

=== Mississippi State ===
Team	1	2	3	4	Total
• #6 Alabama	7	0	7	7	21
Mississippi State	0	10	0	0	10

- Date: November 1
- Location: Mississippi Veterans Memorial Stadium
  Jackson, Mississippi
- Game attendance: 46,000

Scoring summary
1	Alabama	Johnny Davis 3-yard run (Danny Ridgeway kick)	Alabama 7–0
2	MS State	Harvey Hull 45-yard fumble return (Kinney Jordan kick)	7–7
2	MS State	Kinney Jordan 23-yard field goal	MS State 10–7
3	Alabama	Tyrone King 26-yard interception return (Danny Ridgeway kick)	Alabama 14–10
4	Alabama	Willie Shelby 1-yard run (Danny Ridgeway kick)	Alabama 21–10

As they entered their game against Mississippi State, Alabama retained their No. 6 position in the AP Poll. At Jackson, the Crimson Tide overcame a 10–7 halftime deficit and came-from-behind and defeated the Bulldogs 21–10.

=== LSU ===
Team	1	2	3	4	Total
• #5 Alabama	7	7	3	6	23
LSU	7	3	0	0	10

- Date: November 8
- Location: Tiger Stadium
  Baton Rouge, Louisiana
- Game attendance: 65,047

Scoring summary
1	Alabama	Willie Shelby 2-yard run (Bucky Berrey kick)	Alabama 7–0
1	LSU	Terry Robiskie 6-yard run (Mike Conway kick)	7–7
2	Alabama	Richard Todd 7-yard run (Bucky Berrey kick)	Alabama 14–7
2	LSU	Mike Conway 37-yard field goal	Alabama 14–10
3	Alabama	Bucky Berrey 50-yard field goal	Alabama 17–10
4	Alabama	Bucky Berrey 42-yard field goal	Alabama 20–10
4	Alabama	Bucky Berrey 25-yard field goal	Alabama 23–10

After their victory over Mississippi State, Alabama moved into the No. 5 position in the AP Poll prior to their game against LSU. With this 23–10 victory over the rival Tigers, the Crimson Tide secured the 1975 conference championship.

=== Southern Miss ===
Team	1	2	3	4	Total
Southern Miss	0	0	0	6	6
• #5 Alabama	7	10	3	7	27

- Date: November 15
- Location: Denny Stadium
  Tuscaloosa, Alabama
- Game attendance: 58,000

Scoring summary
1	Alabama	Ozzie Newsome 32-yard pass from Richard Todd (Danny Ridgeway kick)	Alabama 7–0
2	Alabama	John Boles 5-yard run (Danny Ridgeway kick)	Alabama 14–0
2	Alabama	Danny Ridgeway 23-yard field goal	Alabama 17–0
3	Alabama	Bucky Berrey 39-yard field goal	Alabama 20–0
4	USM	Ben Garry 6-yard run (2-point pass failed)	Alabama 20–6
4	Alabama	Ozzie Newsome 35-yard pass from Richard Todd (Danny Ridgeway kick)	Alabama 27–6

After they clinched the conference championship with their victory over LSU, Alabama retained the No. 5 position of the AP Poll prior to their game against Southern Miss. On homecoming against the Golden Eagles, the Crimson Tide captured the 600th win in school history with this 27–6 win at Denny Stadium.

=== Auburn ===
Iron Bowl

Team	1	2	3	4	Total
• #4 Alabama	7	0	14	7	28
Auburn	0	0	0	0	0

- Date: November 29
- Location: Legion Field
  Birmingham, Alabama
- Game attendance: 63,500
- Television network: ABC

Scoring summary
1	Alabama	Jerry Brown 17-yard pass from Richard Todd (Danny Ridgeway kick)	Alabama 7–0
3	Alabama	Richard Todd 33-yard run (Danny Ridgeway kick)	Alabama 14–0
3	Alabama	Richard Todd 14-yard run (Danny Ridgeway kick)	Alabama 21–0
4	Alabama	Ozzie Newsome 24-yard pass from Richard Todd (Danny Ridgeway kick)	Alabama 28–0

As they entered the annual Iron Bowl, Alabama moved into the No. 4 position in the AP Poll prior to their match-up at Legion Field. In what was the final game ever coached by Ralph Jordan as the head coach of the Tigers, the Crimson Tide were victorious with this 28–0 shutout at Birmingham.

=== Penn State ===
Sugar Bowl

Team	1	2	3	4	Total
#7 Penn State	0	0	3	3	6
• #3 Alabama	3	0	7	3	13

- Date: December 31
- Location: Louisiana Superdome
  New Orleans
- Game attendance: 75,212
- Television network: ABC

Scoring summary
1	Alabama	Danny Ridgeway 25-yard field goal	Alabama 3–0
3	Penn State	Chris Bahr 42-yard field goal	3–3
3	Alabama	Mike Stock 14-yard run (Danny Ridgeway kick)	Alabama 10–3
4	Penn State	Chris Bahr 37-yard field goal	Alabama 10–6
4	Alabama	Danny Ridgeway 26-yard field goal	Alabama 13–6

Playing the first Sugar Bowl at the Louisiana Superdome, Alabama defeated the Penn State Nittany Lions 13–6 and ended a seven-game bowl losing streak in the process.

== Roster ==
1975 Alabama Crimson Tide football team roster
Players
Coaches
Offense

Pos.	#	Name	Class
RB		Jeff Barnes	So
RB	38	Duffy Boles	Sr
RB	38	Randy Bonner	So
OT		Jim Bradford	So
TE		Jerry Brown	Sr
OT		Woody Buchanan	So
G		Max Busby	Jr
RB		Pete Cavan	So
G		Bob Cryder	So
FB	33	Calvin Culliver	Jr
OT		Bobby Davis	So
FB		Johnny Davis	So
G		Fred Dawson	So
FB		Donnie Faust	So
C		Doug Folmar	Jr
QB	12	Robert Farley	Sr
C		Louis Green	So
HB		John Gunnels	So
SE	84	Joe Dale Harris	Sr
TE		Bill Henderson	So
C		Tom Hufstetler	So
OT		Tim Hurst	So
QB		Kevin Jones	So
C		Terry Jones	So
OT		Larry Kennedy	So
HB		John LaBue	Jr
G		Buford Lambert	Jr
OT		K. J. Lazenby	Jr
OT		Ralph McElreath	Jr
G		Barry McGee	Sr
G		David McIntyre	Jr
TE		Rick McLain	Jr
TE		Sam Maddox	So
OT		Ray Maxwell	Sr
SE	82	Ozzie Newsome	So
QB		Jack O'Rear	Jr
G		Gary Oser	So
OT	79	Buddy Pope	Sr
TE	88	George Pugh	Sr
G	70	Larry Ruffin	Sr
G		David Sadler	So
SE		Russ Schamun	Jr
OT		Mike Sebastian	So
HB	30	Willie Shelby	Sr
C		Sid Smith	Jr
HB	32	Mike Stock	Sr
HB		Mike Sutton	So
HB	27	James Taylor	Sr
OT		Chip Tillman	Jr
QB	14	Richard Todd	Sr
HB		John Turpin	So
G		Russ Waddell	Jr
QB		Bob Walker	So
HB		Jim Ward	Jr
OT		Jerry Washco	Sr
FB		Rick Watson	Jr
SE		Stan Williams	So

Defense

Pos.	#	Name	Class
DB		Phil Allman	So
DT	91	Bob Baumhower	Jr
S	17	Ray Bolden	Sr
LB		Tom Bouck	Jr
LB		Dale Bragan	Jr
LB		Neil Callaway	Jr
DT		Kelley Callies	So
DE		Danny Collins	So
DE	98	Leroy Cook	Sr
S		John Crowe	So
DB		Allen Crumbley	So
LB		Mike Dottorey	So
LB		Conley Duncan	Sr
S		Robert Durkee	So
DB		Thad Flanagan	Jr
S		Les Fowler	So
DE		Robert Gartman	So
DT		Dave Gerasimchuk	Jr
DB		Andy Gothard	Jr
DT		Charles Hannah	Jr
DE		Paul Harris	Jr
DT		Bill Harrison	Jr
DE		Bruce Hodges	So
LB		Colenzo Hubbard	Jr
DB		Chuck Justice	Jr
DB		Tyrone King	Sr
DB		Mike Kramer	So
LB		Mark Lipari	So
LB	47	Woodrow Lowe	Sr
DT		James McArthur	So
DT		Willie McCray	So
DE		Bobby Mikel	So
LB		Dewey Mitchell	So
LB		Greg Montgomery	Sr
LB		Danny Neal	So
DE		John Niehaus	Jr
S		Alan Pizzitola	Sr
DE		Tom Prestwood	Sr
S		Scott Price	So
SS	31	Mark Prudhomme	Sr
LB		Gary Reynolds	So
DB	45	Wayne Rhodes	Sr
DT		Calvin Richardson	So
DT		Walter Robelot	So
LB		Jack Smalley	So
DB	21	Mike Tucker	Jr
DE		Dick Turpin	Sr
LB		Gus White	Jr
LB		Rich Wingo	So

Special teams

Pos.	#	Name	Class
PK		Bucky Berrey	Jr
PK		Mike Davis	Jr
PK		Danny Ridgeway	Sr

Head coach

- Bear Bryant (18th year, Alabama)

Coordinators/assistant coaches

- Paul Crane (2nd year, Alabama)
- Ken Donahue (12th year, Tennessee)
- Mike DuBose (1st year, Alabama)
- Clem Gryska (16th year, Alabama)
- Curley Hallman (3rd year, Texas A&M)
- Dude Hennessey (16th year, Kentucky)
- Bobby Marks (4th year, Texas A&M)
- John Mitchell (3rd year, Alabama)
- Mal Moore (12th year, Alabama)
- Bill Oliver (5th year, Alabama)
- Dee Powell (12th year, Texas A&M)
- Jack Rutledge (10th year, Alabama)
- George White (1st year, Jacksonville State)

Legend

- (C) Team captain
- (S) Suspended
- (I) Ineligible
- Injured
- Redshirt

Roster
Last update: February 24, 2024

== NFL draft ==
Several players that were varsity lettermen from the 1975 squad were drafted into the National Football League (NFL) in the 1976, 1977 and 1978 drafts. These players included:

Year	Round	Overall	Player name	Position	NFL team
1976 NFL draft	1	6	Richard Todd	Quarterback	New York Jets
1976 NFL draft	4	108	Wayne Rhodes	Defensive back	Chicago Bears
1976 NFL draft	5	131	Woodrow Lowe	Linebacker	San Diego Chargers
1976 NFL draft	5	138	Willie Shelby	Running back	Cincinnati Bengals
1976 NFL draft	10	290	Leroy Cook	Defensive end	Dallas Cowboys
1976 NFL draft	12	341	Joe Dale Harris	Wide receiver	Cincinnati Bengals
1977 NFL draft	2	40	Bob Baumhower	Nose tackle	Miami Dolphins
1977 NFL draft	3	57	Charley Hannah	Offensive guard	Tampa Bay Buccaneers
1977 NFL draft	6	159	Paul Harris	Linebacker	Pittsburgh Steelers
1977 NFL draft	8	212	Calvin Culliver	Running back	Denver Broncos
1978 NFL draft	1	18	Bob Cryder	Guard	New England Patriots
1978 NFL draft	1	23	Ozzie Newsome	Tight end	Cleveland Browns
1978 NFL draft	2	30	Johnny Davis	Running back	Tampa Bay Buccaneers
1978 NFL draft	11	284	Terry Jones	Nose tackle	Green Bay Packers
