= 1975 Auburn Tigers football team =

American college football season

1975 Auburn Tigers football
- Conference: Southeastern Conference
- Record: 4–6–1 (2–4 SEC)
- Head coach: Ralph Jordan (25th season)
- Offensive coordinator: Doug Barfield (2nd season)
- Home stadium: Jordan-Hare Stadium

1975 Southeastern Conference football standings
	Conf.					Overall
Team	W		L		T	W		L		T
No. 3 Alabama $	6	–	0	–	0	11	–	1	–	0
Florida	5	–	1	–	0	9	–	3	–	0
No. 19 Georgia	5	–	1	–	0	9	–	3	–	0
Ole Miss	5	–	1	–	0	6	–	5	–	0
Tennessee	3	–	3	–	0	7	–	5	–	0
Vanderbilt	2	–	4	–	0	7	–	4	–	0
LSU	2	–	4	–	0	5	–	6	–	0
Auburn	2	–	4	–	0	3	–	6	–	2
Mississippi State	1	–	4	–	1	6	–	4	–	1
Kentucky	0	–	6	–	0	2	–	8	–	1
$ – Conference champion; Mississippi State later forfeited 4 1975 wins and one tie due to NCAA violations.; Rankings from AP Poll

The 1975 Auburn Tigers football team achieved an overall record of 3–6–2 and 1–4–1 in the SEC in Ralph "Shug" Jordan's last year as head coach at Auburn after 25 years; however, the official record improved to 4–6–1 (2–4) when Mississippi State forfeited its tie that year due to NCAA imposed sanctions.

Three players were named to the All-SEC first team for 1975: Chuck Fletcher (offensive tackle), Rick Telhieard (defensive tackle), and Clyde Baumgartner (special teams).

== Schedule ==
Date	Opponent	Rank	Site	Result	Attendance	Source
September 13	Memphis State*	No. 7	Jordan-Hare Stadium; Auburn, AL	L 20–31	55,000	
September 20	at Baylor*		Baylor Stadium; Waco, TX	T 10–10	46,300	
September 27	at No. 16 Tennessee		Neyland Stadium; Knoxville, TN (rivalry)	L 17–21	74,611	
October 4	Virginia Tech*		Jordan-Hare Stadium; Auburn, AL	L 16–23	45,000	
October 11	at Kentucky		Commonwealth Stadium; Lexington, KY	W 15–9	57,722	
October 18	at Georgia Tech*		Grant Field; Atlanta, GA (rivalry)	W 31–27	58,316	
October 25	at Florida State*		Doak Campbell Stadium; Tallahassee, FL	W 17–14	39,344	
November 1	No. 11 Florida		Jordan-Hare Stadium; Auburn, AL (rivalry)	L 14–31	65,000	
November 8	Mississippi State^{†}		Jordan-Hare Stadium; Auburn, AL	W 21–21 (forfeit)	64,796	
November 15	at No. 20 Georgia		Sanford Stadium; Athens, GA (rivalry)	L 13–28	57,500	
November 29	vs. No. 4 Alabama		Legion Field; Birmingham, AL (Iron Bowl)	L 0–28	63,500	
*Non-conference game; ^{†}Homecoming; Rankings from AP Poll released prior to the game

== Roster ==
1975 Auburn Tigers football team roster
Players
Coaches
Offense

Pos.	#	Name	Class
G	77	Arnoldo Abreu	Jr
QB	10	Clyde Baumgartner	Jr
RB	34	Kenny Burks	Sr
TE	82	Ed Butler	Sr
QB	14	John Crane	So
G	74	Bill Evans	Jr
OT	71	Chuck Fletcher	Sr
WR	42	Terry Fuller	So
QB	11	Phil Gargis	Jr
WR	48	Jeff Gilligan	Sr
RB	22	Mitzi Jackson	Sr
G	62	Lynn Johnson	Jr
TE	80	Reese McCall	So
RB	40	Rick Neel	Sr
OT	64	Dave Ostrowski	Jr
C	50	Ben Strickland	Sr
WR	83	Billy Wood	Jr

Defense

Pos.	#	Name	Class
S	25	Bill Cunningham	Jr
DE	99	Liston Eddins	Sr
S	24	Rick Freeman	So
DB	28	Lance Hill	Jr
LB	54	Carl Hubbard	Sr
LB	68	Pat Jones	Sr
LB	56	Tony Long	Jr
DB	19	Mike McCloud	So
DE	93	Jim Pitts	Sr
LB	38	Ricky Sanders	Jr
LB	43	Kim Sellers	So
DE	98	Joe Shaw	So
DT	70	Steve Stranaland	Sr
DT	91	Rick Telhiard	Sr

Special teams

Pos.	#	Name	Class
P	2	Neil O'Donoghue	Jr

Head coach

- Ralph Jordan

Coordinators/assistant coaches

- Doug Barfield

Legend

- (C) Team captain
- (S) Suspended
- (I) Ineligible
- Injured
- Redshirt
