= 1975 Gator Bowl =

American college football game

Maryland Terrapins	Florida Gators
(8–2–1)	(9–2)
ACC	SEC
13	0
Head coach: Jerry Claiborne	Head coach: Doug Dickey
AP / Coaches; 17 / 20	AP / Coaches; 13 / 13
	1	2	3	4	Total
Maryland	7	3	0	3	13
Florida	0	0	0	0	0
- Date: December 29, 1975
- Season: 1975
- Stadium: Gator Bowl Stadium
- Location: Jacksonville, Florida
- MVP: MD - Steve Atkins RB; FL - Sammy Green LB
- Referee: Bill Jennings (Big Eight)
- Attendance: 64,012

United States TV coverage
- Network: ABC

The 1975 Gator Bowl was a college football bowl game played between the Maryland Terrapins and the Florida Gators on December 29, 1975. Maryland won the game by a score of 13–0.
