= 1975 Sugar Bowl =

American college football game

- 42nd Sugar Bowl
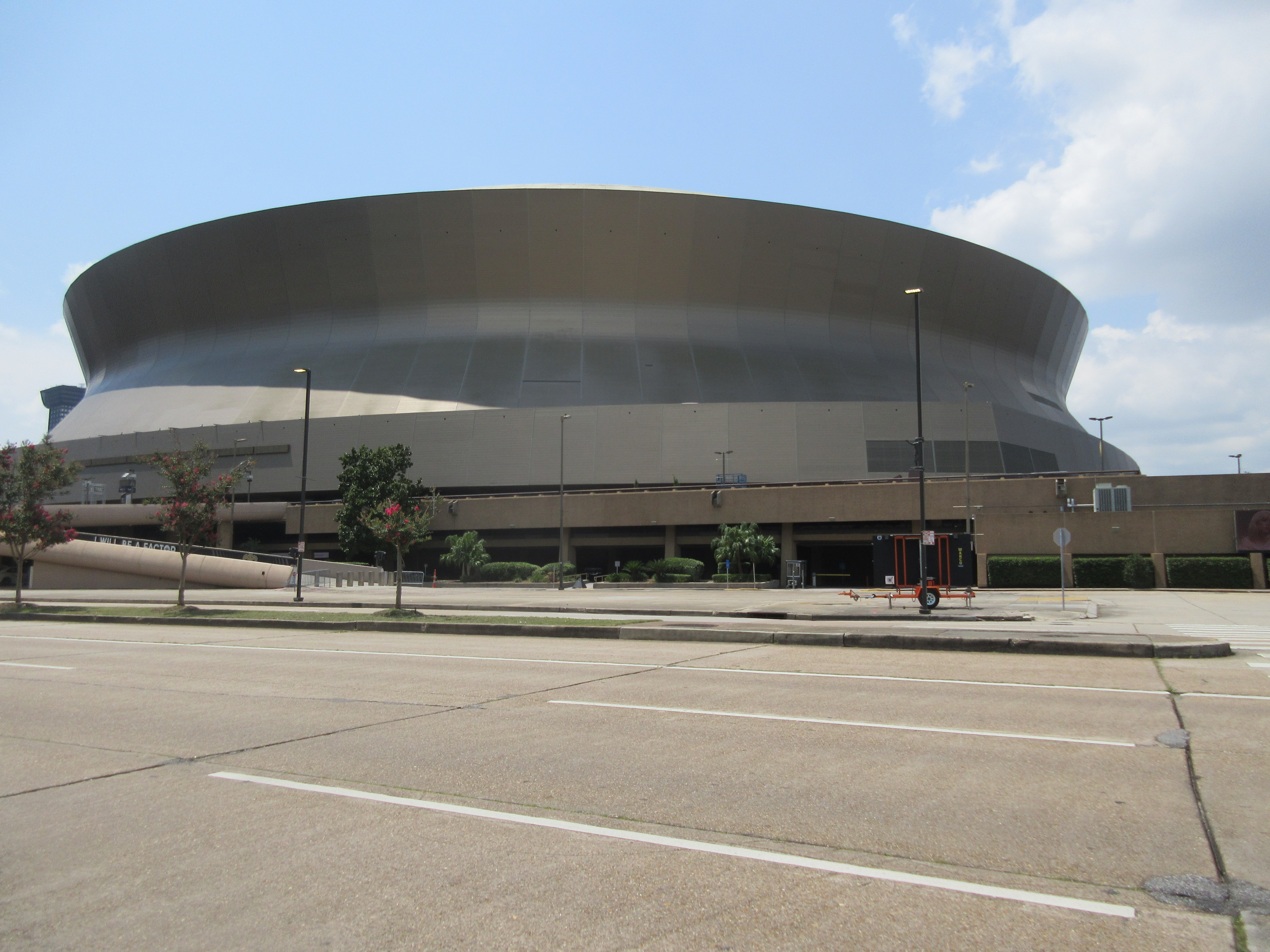
- The Louisiana Superdome in New Orleans, Louisiana, hosted the Sugar Bowl.
Penn State Nittany Lions	Alabama Crimson Tide
(9–2)	(10–1)
Independent	SEC
6	13
Head coach: Joe Paterno	Head coach: Bear Bryant
AP / Coaches; 8 / 8	AP / Coaches; 4 / 4
	1	2	3	4	Total
Penn State	0	0	3	3	6
Alabama	3	0	7	3	13
- Date: December 31, 1975
- Season: 1975
- Stadium: Louisiana Superdome
- Location: New Orleans, Louisiana
- MVP: Richard Todd (Alabama QB)
- Favorite: Alabama by 13 points
- Referee: Clint Fuller (Southwest)
- Attendance: 75,212

United States TV coverage
- Network: ABC
- Announcers: Keith Jackson, Bud Wilkinson

The 1975 Sugar Bowl was the 42nd edition of the college football bowl game, played at night in the new Louisiana Superdome in New Orleans, Louisiana, on Wednesday, December 31. Part of the 1975–76 bowl game season, it matched the fourth-ranked Alabama Crimson Tide of the Southeastern Conference (SEC) and the independent #8 Penn State Nittany Lions. In the first Sugar Bowl played in the recently completed Superdome, favored Alabama won 13–6.

This was the last of four consecutive editions played at night on New Year's Eve; it returned to January 1, 1977, as a day game.

== Teams ==
=== Alabama ===
Alabama completed the regular season as SEC champions with a 10–1 record. The only defeat was a 20–7 non-conference loss to Missouri in week one. On November 17, bowl officials announced that Alabama would face Penn State in the Sugar Bowl. It marked the seventh appearance for Alabama in the Sugar Bowl and their 29th bowl game.

The Tide entered the Sugar Bowl as a thirteen-point favorite but had not won in its last eight bowl games.

=== Penn State ===
Penn State completed the regular season with a record of 9–2. Their only defeats were a 17–9 loss to Ohio State in week three and a 15–14 loss to North Carolina State in week ten. On November 17, bowl officials announced that Penn State would face Alabama in the Sugar Bowl. The invitation to Penn State was controversial as Alabama's Bryant personally selected Penn State as their opponent instead of the Big Eight runner-up (#6 Nebraska), ranked higher than the Nittany Lions. Bryant was miffed that the Orange Bowl, which was committed to the Big Eight champion (#3 Oklahoma), had snubbed the Crimson Tide in favor of the Big Ten runner-up, #5 Michigan (the Big Ten (and Pac-8), allowed multiple bowl teams for the first time this season). In Bryant's view, this effectively killed Alabama's chances for a national championship. It was the second appearance for Penn State in the Sugar Bowl and their fourteenth bowl game.

== Game Summary ==
The game kicked off shortly after 6:30 p.m. CST on New Year's Eve, televised by ABC.

After Penn State's Chris Bahr missed a 62-yard field goal, Alabama scored on a 25-yard Danny Ridgeway field goal. The second quarter was scoreless, and the Crimson Tide led 3–0 at halftime.

Penn State tied the game at three on a 42-yard Bahr field goal in the third quarter. Alabama responded on the following drive with the lone touchdown of the game, a 14-yard Mike Stock run, to take a 10–3 lead.

A 37-yard Bahr field goal reduced the lead to four points with under twelve minutes remaining. The Crimson Tide responded with an extended drive, resulting in a 28-yard Ridgeway field goal to push the lead back to seven at 13–6, the final score. For his 210 yards passing after completing ten of twelve pass attempts, Alabama quarterback Richard Todd was named the game's outstanding player.

It was Alabama's first bowl win in nine years (since January 1967) and started a string of six straight bowl victories.

Scoring summary

Quarter	Time	Drive			Team	Scoring information	Score	
Quarter	Time	Plays	Yards	TOP	Team	Scoring information	Penn State	Alabama
1	5:33	9	72		Alabama	25-yard field goal by Danny Ridgeway	0	3
3	4:33		69		Penn State	42-yard field goal by Chris Bahr	3	3
3	1:42				Alabama	Mike Stock 14-yard touchdown run, Danny Ridgeway kick good	3	10
4	11:19				Penn State	37-yard field goal by Chris Bahr	6	10
4	3:19				Alabama	28-yard field goal by Danny Ridgeway	6	13
"TOP" = time of possession. For other American football terms, see Glossary of American football.							6	13

== Statistics ==
Statistics	Penn State	Alabama
First downs	12	14
Rushes–yards	41–157	49–106
Passing yards	57	210
Passes	8–14–1	10–12–0
Total offense	55–214	61–316
Punts–average	4–48.5	5–40.8
Fumbles–lost	1–0	1–0
Turnovers	1	0
Penalties–yards	0–0	3–22

== See also ==
- Alabama–Penn State football rivalry
