= Sammy Green =

American football player (born 1954)

No. 56
- Position: Linebacker

Personal information
- Born: October 12, 1954 (age 72); Bradenton, Florida, U.S.
- Listed height: 6 ft 2 in (1.88 m)
- Listed weight: 228 lb (103 kg)

Career information
- High school: Fort Meade (Fort Meade, Florida)
- College: Florida
- NFL draft: 1976: 2nd round, 29th overall pick

Career history
- Seattle Seahawks (1976–1979); Houston Oilers (1980)

Awards and highlights
- Consensus All-American (1975); First-team All-SEC (1975) Credited with 202 tackles during senior season with Gators; a Florida Gator record; University of Florida Athletic Hall of Fame

Career NFL statistics
- Sacks: 2
- Fumble recoveries: 2
- Interceptions: 3
- Stats at Pro Football Reference

Samuel Lee Green (born October 12, 1954) is an American former professional football player who was a linebacker for five seasons in the National Football League (NFL) during the 1970s and early 1980s. He played college football for the Florida Gators, receiving consensus All-American honors in 1975. A second-round pick in the 1976 NFL draft, Green in the NFL for the Seattle Seahawks and the Houston Oilers.

== Early life ==
Sammy Green was born in Bradenton, Florida in 1954. He attended Fort Meade High School in Fort Meade, Florida, where he played high school football for the Fort Meade Miners.

== College career ==
Green accepted an athletic scholarship to attend the University of Florida in Gainesville, Florida, where he played for coach Doug Dickey's Florida Gators football team from 1972 to 1975. Memorably, as a sophomore in 1973, Green forced a critical fumble by Auburn Tigers tailback Sullivan Walker, which led to a touchdown and the Gators' margin of victory in a 12–8 upset of the Tigers at home—the Gators' first-ever win at Jordan–Hare Stadium. He was a team captain, a first-team All-Southeastern Conference (SEC) selection, and a consensus first-team All-American in 1975. Green was inducted into the University of Florida Athletic Hall of Fame as a "Gator Great" in 2003. In one of a series of articles published by The Gainesville Sun in 2006, the newspaper's sports editors ranked him as the No. 51 all-time greatest Gator among the top 100 players from the first century of the Florida football team.

While a student at Florida, Green was a member of Alpha Phi Alpha fraternity (Theta Sigma chapter).

== Professional career ==
The Seattle Seahawks selected Green in the second round (29th overall) in the 1976 NFL Draft, and he played for the Seahawks for four seasons from 1976 to 1979. He had three interceptions during his time with the Seahawks, including one that he returned ninety-one yards for a touchdown in 1979, the longest in Seahawks history. Green played his final NFL season for the Houston Oilers in 1980. He played in sixty-two NFL games in his five-season career, starting in forty-four of them. Spent four years in the USFL with Tampa Bay Bandits, Birmingham Stallions, Memphis Showboats and New Jersey Generals.

== Life after football ==
Green completed his Master's Degree at Iowa State University, and as of 2010, is working to complete a Doctorate. He Has now retired from Washington High School in Cedar Rapids, Iowa. He now teaches English and Composition at Skagit Valley College in Washington State as of 2022.

== See also ==
- 1975 College Football All-America Team
- Florida Gators football, 1970–79
- List of Alpha Phi Alpha brothers
- List of Florida Gators football All-Americans
- List of Florida Gators in the NFL draft
- List of University of Florida Athletic Hall of Fame members
- List of Seattle Seahawks players
