= Wally Pesuit =

American football player (born 1954)

No. 71, 65, 67
- Positions: Guard, center, tackle, defensive end

Personal information
- Born: March 4, 1954 (age 72); Steubenville, Ohio, U.S.
- Listed height: 6 ft 4 in (1.93 m)
- Listed weight: 252 lb (114 kg)

Career information
- College: Kentucky
- NFL draft: 1976: 5th round, 151st overall pick

Career history
- Dallas Cowboys (1976)*; Atlanta Falcons (1976); Miami Dolphins (1976-1978); Detroit Lions (1979–1980); Chicago Blitz (USFL) (1983); Jacksonville Bulls (USFL) (1984)
- * Offseason or practice squad member only

Career NFL statistics
- Games played: 48
- Games started: 5
- Stats at Pro Football Reference

Walter George Pesuit (/pɛˈsut/ peh-SOOT; born March 4, 1954) is an American former professional football player who was an offensive and defensive lineman in the National Football League (NFL) for the Atlanta Falcons, Miami Dolphins and Detroit Lions. He played college football for the Kentucky Wildcats.

== Early life ==
Pesuit attended Wintersville High School, where he was an All-state offensive tackle, a wrestling and weight-lifter champion in the Ohio Valley Conference. He also practiced the discus throw and the shot put.

He accepted a football scholarship from the University of Kentucky. He was named a starter at offensive guard as a sophomore. He was named the starter at left tackle as a junior. He was co-captain and the starting left tackle as a senior.

== Professional career ==
=== Dallas Cowboys ===
Pesuit was selected by the Dallas Cowboys in the fifth round (151st overall) of the 1976 NFL draft, with the intention of playing him at the defensive line. He was waived on August 23.

=== Atlanta Falcons ===
He was claimed off waivers by the Atlanta Falcons who used him at defensive end. On November 3, 1976, he was released after one game to make room for linebacker Jim Cope.

=== Miami Dolphins ===
On December 6, 1976, he was signed by the Miami Dolphins. He was a backup who played different positions along the offensive line. He was cut on August 21, 1979.

=== Detroit Lions ===
Pesuit was claimed off waivers by the Detroit Lions to replace Larry Tearry who abruptly left the team. That season, he started 5 games at center. He was released on August 26, 1980. He was later re-signed during the season and released on November 6, to make room for Rod Walters.

=== Chicago Blitz ===
In 1983, he signed with the Chicago Blitz of the United States Football League.

=== Jacksonville Bulls ===
The Jacksonville Bulls selected him from the Chicago Blitz roster in the 1983 USFL Expansion Draft. In 1984, Pesuit played all 18 games as the Bulls' long snapper and a reserve offensive lineman.

== Personal life ==
His father Walter V., played for the Cleveland Rams in the National Football League as a 5-8 halfback in 1938.
