= 1975 Florida Gators football team =

American college football season

1975 Florida Gators football

Gator Bowl, L 0–13 vs. Maryland
- Conference: Southeastern Conference
- Record: 9–3 (5–1 SEC)
- Head coach: Doug Dickey (6th season)
- Offensive coordinator: Jimmy Dunn (6th season)
- Offensive scheme: Wishbone
- Defensive coordinator: Doug Knotts (6th season)
- Captains: Jimmy DuBose; Sammy Green
- Home stadium: Florida Field

1975 Southeastern Conference football standings
	Conf.					Overall
Team	W		L		T	W		L		T
No. 3 Alabama $	6	–	0	–	0	11	–	1	–	0
Florida	5	–	1	–	0	9	–	3	–	0
No. 19 Georgia	5	–	1	–	0	9	–	3	–	0
Ole Miss	5	–	1	–	0	6	–	5	–	0
Tennessee	3	–	3	–	0	7	–	5	–	0
Vanderbilt	2	–	4	–	0	7	–	4	–	0
LSU	2	–	4	–	0	5	–	6	–	0
Auburn	2	–	4	–	0	3	–	6	–	2
Mississippi State	1	–	4	–	1	6	–	4	–	1
Kentucky	0	–	6	–	0	2	–	8	–	1
$ – Conference champion; Mississippi State later forfeited 4 1975 wins and one tie due to NCAA violations.; Rankings from AP Poll

The 1975 Florida Gators football team represented the University of Florida during the 1975 NCAA Division I football season. The season was Doug Dickey's sixth and most successful season as the head coach of the Florida Gators football team. Dickey's 1975 Florida Gators finished with a 9–3 overall record and a 5–1 Southeastern Conference (SEC) record, tying for second among ten SEC teams. The team featured consensus All-American linebacker Sammy Green.

Florida's 1975 milestone of holding all regular season opponents to 16 points or less would eventually be matched by the 2025 Ohio State Buckeyes.

== Schedule ==
Date	Opponent	Rank	Site	TV	Result	Attendance	Source
September 13	SMU*	No. 19	Florida Field; Gainesville, FL		W 40–14	55,472	
September 20	at NC State*	No. 13	Carter Stadium; Raleigh, NC		L 7–8	43,330	
September 27	at Mississippi State	No. 19	Mississippi Veterans Memorial Stadium; Jackson, MS		W 27–10	43,500	
October 4	at LSU	No. 20	Tiger Stadium; Baton Rouge, LA (rivalry)		W 34–6	67,494	
October 11	Vanderbilt	No. 18	Florida Field; Gainesville, FL		W 35–0	58,631	
October 18	Florida State*	No. 14	Florida Field; Gainesville, FL (rivalry)		W 34–8	64,401	
October 25	Duke*^{†}	No. 12	Florida Field; Gainesville, FL		W 24–16	62,222	
November 1	at Auburn	No. 11	Jordan-Hare Stadium; Auburn, AL (rivalry)		W 31–14	65,000	
November 8	vs. Georgia	No. 11	Gator Bowl Stadium; Jacksonville, FL (rivalry)	ABC	L 7–10	74,416	
November 15	Kentucky	No. 14	Florida Field; Gainesville, FL (rivalry)		W 48–7	59,671	
November 29	at Miami (FL)*	No. 13	Miami Orange Bowl; Miami, FL (rivalry)		W 15–11	25,462	
December 29	vs. No. 17 Maryland*	No. 13	Gator Bowl Stadium; Jacksonville, FL (Gator Bowl)	CBS	L 0–13	64,012	
*Non-conference game; ^{†}Homecoming; Rankings from AP Poll released prior to the game

== Roster ==
1975 Florida Gators football team roster
Players
Coaches
Offense

Pos.	#	Name	Class
RB	30	Earl Carr	So
WR	89	Wes Chandler	So
FB	35	Jimmy DuBose	Sr
QB	8	Don Gaffney	Sr

Defense

Pos.	#	Name	Class
LB	99	Sammy Green	Sr
DT	66	Scott Hutchinson	So

Special teams

Pos.	#	Name	Class
K	3	David Posey	Jr

Head coach

- Doug Dickey

Coordinators/assistant coaches

Legend

- (C) Team captain
- (S) Suspended
- (I) Ineligible
- Injured
- Redshirt

== Team players in the NFL ==
Player	Position	Round	Pick	NFL club
Sammy Green	Linebacker	2	29	Seattle Seahawks
Jimmy DuBose	Running Back	2	30	Tampa Bay Buccaneers
