= 1975 Maryland Terrapins football team =

American college football season

1975 Maryland Terrapins football

ACC champion Gator Bowl champion

Gator Bowl, W 13–0 vs. Florida
- Conference: Atlantic Coast Conference

Ranking
- Coaches: No. 11
- AP: No. 13
- Record: 9–2–1 (5–0 ACC)
- Head coach: Jerry Claiborne (4th season)
- Home stadium: Byrd Stadium

1975 Atlantic Coast Conference football standings
	Conf.					Overall
Team	W		L		T	W		L		T
No. 13 Maryland $	5	–	0	–	0	9	–	2	–	1
Duke	3	–	0	–	2	4	–	5	–	2
NC State	2	–	2	–	1	7	–	4	–	1
Wake Forest	3	–	3	–	0	3	–	8	–	0
Clemson	2	–	3	–	0	2	–	9	–	0
North Carolina	1	–	4	–	1	3	–	7	–	1
Virginia	0	–	4	–	0	1	–	10	–	0
$ – Conference champion; Rankings from AP Poll

The 1975 Maryland Terrapins football team represented University of Maryland in the 1975 NCAA Division I football season. The Terrapins offense scored 312 points while the defense allowed 150 points. Led by head coach Jerry Claiborne, the Terrapins appeared in the Gator Bowl, where they defeated Florida.

== Schedule ==
Date	Opponent	Rank	Site	Result	Attendance	Source
September 6	Villanova*	No. 17	Byrd Stadium; College Park, MD	W 41–0	41,362	
September 13	at No. 20 Tennessee*	No. 14	Neyland Stadium; Knoxville, TN	L 8–26	74,161	
September 20	at North Carolina		Kenan Memorial Stadium; Chapel Hill, NC	W 34–7	43,000	
September 27	at Kentucky*	No. 20	Commonwealth Stadium; Lexington, KY	T 10–10	55,000	
October 4	Syracuse*^{†}		Byrd Stadium; College Park, MD	W 24–7	43,863	
October 11	NC State		Byrd Stadium; College Park, MD	W 37–22	39,221	
October 18	at Wake Forest	No. 19	Groves Stadium; Winston-Salem, NC	W 27–0	19,300	
November 1	No. 9 Penn State*	No. 14	Byrd Stadium; College Park, MD (rivalry)	L 13–15	58,973	
November 8	at Cincinnati*	No. 16	Riverfront Stadium; Cincinnati, OH	W 21–19	16,478	
November 15	at Clemson		Memorial Stadium; Clemson, SC	W 22–20	35,073	
November 22	Virginia	No. 20	Byrd Stadium; College Park, MD (rivalry)	W 62–24	44,867	
December 29	vs. No. 13 Florida*	No. 17	Gator Bowl Stadium; Jacksonville, FL (Gator Bowl)	W 13–0	64,012	
*Non-conference game; ^{†}Homecoming; Rankings from AP Poll released prior to the game

== Roster ==
1975 Maryland Terrapins football team roster
Players
Coaches
Offense

Pos.	#	Name	Class
WR	22	Jim Hagan	So
RB	25	Rick Jennings	Sr
WR		Vince Kinney	So
QB	13	Mark Manges	So
TE	86	Bob Raba	Jr

Defense

Pos.	#	Name	Class
DT	79	Joe Campbell	Jr

Special teams

Pos.	#	Name	Class

Head coach

- Jerry Claiborne

Coordinators/assistant coaches

Legend

- (C) Team captain
- (S) Suspended
- (I) Ineligible
- Injured
- Redshirt

== 1976 NFL draft ==
The following players were selected in the 1976 NFL draft.

Player	Position	Round	Overall	NFL team
Rich Jennings	Running back	11	313	Oakland Raiders
