= 1975 Georgia Bulldogs football team =

American college football season

1975 Georgia Bulldogs football

Cotton Bowl Classic, L 10–31 vs. Arkansas
- Conference: Southeastern Conference

Ranking
- Coaches: No. 19
- AP: No. 19
- Record: 9–3 (5–1 SEC)
- Head coach: Vince Dooley (12th season)
- Defensive coordinator: Erk Russell (12th season)
- Base defense: 4–4
- Home stadium: Sanford Stadium

1975 Southeastern Conference football standings
	Conf.					Overall
Team	W		L		T	W		L		T
No. 3 Alabama $	6	–	0	–	0	11	–	1	–	0
Florida	5	–	1	–	0	9	–	3	–	0
No. 19 Georgia	5	–	1	–	0	9	–	3	–	0
Ole Miss	5	–	1	–	0	6	–	5	–	0
Tennessee	3	–	3	–	0	7	–	5	–	0
Vanderbilt	2	–	4	–	0	7	–	4	–	0
LSU	2	–	4	–	0	5	–	6	–	0
Auburn	2	–	4	–	0	3	–	6	–	2
Mississippi State	1	–	4	–	1	6	–	4	–	1
Kentucky	0	–	6	–	0	2	–	8	–	1
$ – Conference champion; Mississippi State later forfeited 4 1975 wins and one tie due to NCAA violations.; Rankings from AP Poll

The 1975 Georgia Bulldogs football team represented the University of Georgia as a member of the Southeastern Conference (SEC) during the 1975 NCAA Division I football season. Led by 12th-year head coach Vince Dooley, the Bulldogs compiled an overall record of 9–3, with a mark of 5–1 in conference play, and finished tied for second in the SEC.

== Schedule ==
Date	Opponent	Rank	Site	TV	Result	Attendance	Source
September 6	Pittsburgh*		Sanford Stadium; Athens, GA		L 9–19	40,000	
September 20	Mississippi State		Sanford Stadium; Athens, GA		W 28–6	43,500	
September 27	at South Carolina*		Williams–Brice Stadium; Columbia, SC (rivalry)		W 28–20	66,944	
October 4	Clemson*^{†}		Sanford Stadium; Athens, GA (rivalry)		W 35–7	57,800	
October 11	at Ole Miss		Hemingway Stadium; Oxford, MS		L 13–28	31,200	
October 18	at Vanderbilt		Dudley Field; Nashville, TN (rivalry)		W 47–3	20,538	
October 25	Kentucky		Sanford Stadium; Athens, GA		W 21–13	50,000	
November 1	Richmond*		Sanford Stadium; Athens, GA		W 28–24	41,500	
November 8	vs. No. 11 Florida		Gator Bowl Stadium; Jacksonville, FL (rivalry)	ABC	W 10–7	70,416	
November 15	Auburn	No. 20	Sanford Stadium; Athens, GA (rivalry)	ABC	W 28–13	57,500	
November 27	at Georgia Tech*	No. 15	Grant Field; Atlanta, GA (rivalry)	ABC	W 42–26	55,135	
January 1, 1976	vs. No. 18 Arkansas*	No. 12	Cotton Bowl; Dallas, TX (Cotton Bowl Classic)	CBS	L 10–31	74,500	
*Non-conference game; ^{†}Homecoming; Rankings from AP Poll released prior to the game

== Roster ==
1975 Georgia Bulldogs football team roster
Players
Coaches
Offense

Pos.	#	Name	Class
		Richard Appleby
QB		Ray Goff
		Gene Washington

Defense

Pos.	#	Name	Class
LB		Ben Zambiasi	So

Special teams

Pos.	#	Name	Class
P	4	Bucky Dilts	Jr
K		Allan Leavitt	Jr

Head coach

- Vince Dooley

Coordinators/assistant coaches

- Erk Russell (DC)

Legend

- (C) Team captain
- (S) Suspended
- (I) Ineligible
- Injured
- Redshirt
