= Randy Wallace =

American football player

Profile
- Position: Quarterback

Career information
- High school: Englewood (Jacksonville, Florida)
- College: Tennessee (1973–1976)

Randy Wallace is an American former college football quarterback who played for the Tennessee Volunteers.

== Early life ==
Wallace played high school football at Englewood High School in Jacksonville, Florida.

== College career ==
Wallace enrolled at the University of Tennessee to play college football for the Volunteers. He redshirted the 1973 season and was a three-year letterman from 1974 to 1976. He backed up Condredge Holloway in 1974. After Holloway was knocked out of the 1974 Liberty Bowl against Maryland, Wallace took over at quarterback. He threw an 11-yard touchdown with 2:38 left to play as the Volunteers went on to win by a score of 7–3. Wallace finished the year completing 13 of 26 passes (50.0%) for 172 yards and one touchdown while also rushing 51 times for 112 yards.

Wallace missed 1975 spring practice to play college baseball for the Volunteers as a third basemen. He was selected by the Chicago Cubs in the third round, with the 52nd overall pick, of the 1975 Major League Baseball draft. On June 23, 1975, Wallace announced that he had declined the Cubs' contract offer, instead deciding to continue playing football at Tennessee. He spent the first several games of the 1975 season splitting time with starter Gary Roach, but eventually took over as the full-time starter. Overall in 1975, Wallace completed 72 of 145 passes (49.7%) for 1,318 yards, eight touchdowns, and 11 interceptions while also rushing 132 times for 211 yards and three touchdowns. He led the Southeastern Conference in completions, passing yards, and passing touchdowns.

Wallace returned as starter in 1976. He broke a bone in his left wrist on October 23 against Florida and was replaced by Joe Haugh. However, Wallace returned as starter the next week despite the bone still being broken. He finished the season with 68 completions on 130 passing attempts (52.3%) for 1,046 yards, four touchdowns, and six interceptions, and 114 rushes for 249 yards and three touchdowns. Wallace had a 12–10 record as the Volunteers' starting quarterback.
