= 1975 NC State Wolfpack football team =

American college football season

1975 NC State Wolfpack football

Peach Bowl, L 10–13 vs. West Virginia
- Conference: Atlantic Coast Conference
- Record: 7–4–1 (2–2–1 ACC)
- Head coach: Lou Holtz (4th season)
- Offensive coordinator: Brian Burke (4th season)
- Home stadium: Carter Stadium

1975 Atlantic Coast Conference football standings
	Conf.					Overall
Team	W		L		T	W		L		T
No. 13 Maryland $	5	–	0	–	0	9	–	2	–	1
Duke	3	–	0	–	2	4	–	5	–	2
NC State	2	–	2	–	1	7	–	4	–	1
Wake Forest	3	–	3	–	0	3	–	8	–	0
Clemson	2	–	3	–	0	2	–	9	–	0
North Carolina	1	–	4	–	1	3	–	7	–	1
Virginia	0	–	4	–	0	1	–	10	–	0
$ – Conference champion; Rankings from AP Poll

The 1975 NC State Wolfpack football team represented North Carolina State University during the 1975 NCAA Division I football season. The Wolfpack were led by head coach Lou Holtz, in his fourth and final year with the team, and played their home games at Carter Stadium in Raleigh, North Carolina. They competed as members of the Atlantic Coast Conference, finishing in third. NC State was invited to the 1975 Peach Bowl in Atlanta, where they lost to West Virginia. Holtz left at the conclusion of the season to accept the head coaching position with the New York Jets.

== Schedule ==
Date	Opponent	Rank	Site	TV	Result	Attendance	Source
September 6	East Carolina*	No. 13	Carter Stadium; Raleigh, NC (rivalry)		W 26–3	47,500	
September 13	Wake Forest	No. 15	Carter Stadium; Raleigh, NC (rivalry)		L 22–30	36,500	
September 20	No. 13 Florida*		Carter Stadium; Raleigh, NC		W 8–7	43,330	
September 27	at Michigan State*		Spartan Stadium; East Lansing, MI	ABC	L 15–37	59,111	
October 4	Indiana*		Carter Stadium; Raleigh, NC		W 27–0	33,500	
October 11	at Maryland		Byrd Stadium; College Park, MD		L 22–37	39,221	
October 18	North Carolina		Carter Stadium; Raleigh, NC (rivalry)		W 21–20	50,500	
October 25	at Clemson		Memorial Stadium; Clemson, SC (rivalry)		W 45–7	42, 934	
November 1	South Carolina*		Carter Stadium; Raleigh, NC	ABC	W 28–21	48,500	
November 8	at No. 8 Penn State*		Beaver Stadium; University Park, PA		W 15–14	59,536	
November 15	at Duke		Wallace Wade Stadium; Durham, NC (rivalry)		T 21–21	43,200	
December 31	vs. West Virginia*		Atlanta–Fulton County Stadium; Atlanta, GA (Peach Bowl)	Mizlou	L 10–13	45,134	
*Non-conference game; Rankings from AP Poll released prior to the game

== Roster ==
1975 NC State Wolfpack football team roster
Players
Coaches
Offense

Pos.	#	Name	Class
QB	11	Dave Buckey	Sr
WR	19	Don Buckey	Sr

Defense

Pos.	#	Name	Class
DT	95	Dan Meier	Sr

Special teams

Pos.	#	Name	Class

Head coach

- Lou Holtz

Coordinators/assistant coaches

- Larry Beightol – Offensive line

Legend

- (C) Team captain
- (S) Suspended
- (I) Ineligible
- Injured
- Redshirt
