= 1975 Peach Bowl =

American college football game

- 8th Peach Bowl
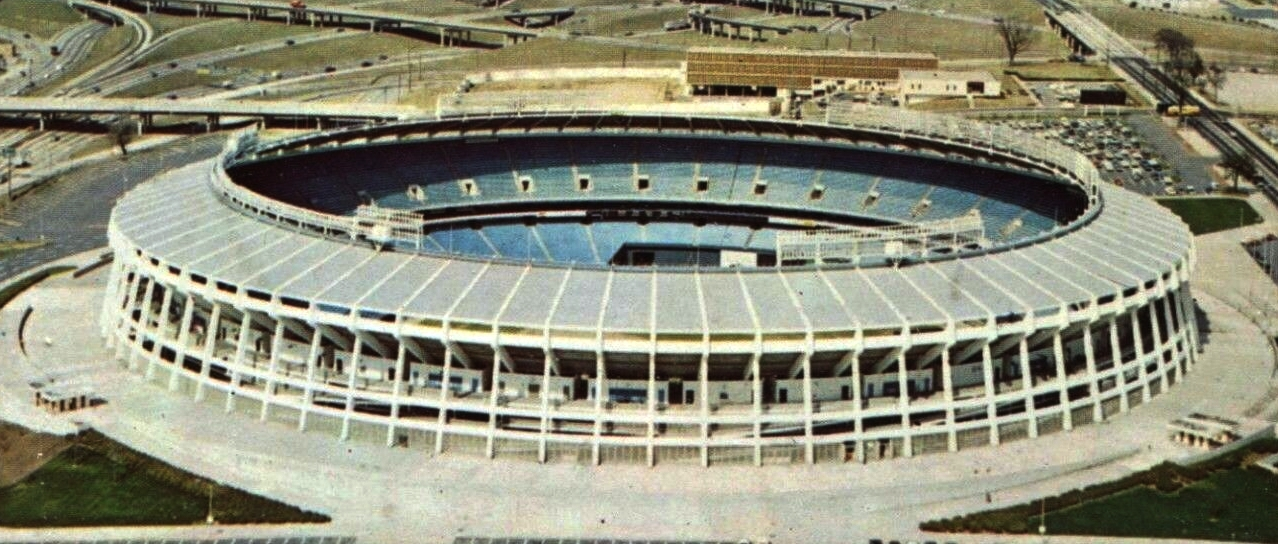
- Atlanta–Fulton County Stadium in Atlanta, Georgia, hosted the Peach Bowl.
West Virginia Mountaineers	NC State Wolfpack
(8–3)	(7–3–1)
Independent	ACC
13	10
Head coach: Bobby Bowden	Head coach: Lou Holtz
	1	2	3	4	Total
West Virginia	0	6	0	7	13
NC State	7	3	0	0	10
- Date: December 31, 1975
- Season: 1975
- Stadium: Atlanta–Fulton County Stadium
- Location: Atlanta, Georgia
- MVP: QB Dan Kendra (West Virginia); LB Ray Marshall (West Virginia)
- Referee: Dan Foley (Big Eight)
- Attendance: 45,134

United States TV coverage
- Network: Mizlou

The 1975 Peach Bowl matched the West Virginia Mountaineers and the NC State Wolfpack.

== Background ==
The Mountaineers had been ranked for four weeks and were undefeated at 4–0 before a 39–0 loss to Penn State knocked them out of the poll, going 4–2 from that point on and playing in their first bowl game since the 1972 Peach Bowl. A 2–2–1 ACC record made the Wolfpack finish third in the conference, but they were playing in a bowl game for the fourth straight season.

== Game summary ==
Rickey Adams capped a 73-yard drive on the Wolfpack's first drive to give them an early lead. After the Wolfpack drove to the Mountaineer 10, they failed to get into the endzone, settling for a Jay Sherrill field goal to have a 10–0 lead with :53 left in the half. But West Virginia went on a quick drive and scored when Dan Kendra threw a 39-yard pass to Arthur Owens to make it 10–6 at halftime. While driving to take the lead in the 4th, Kendra threw a pass that was juggled by two defenders, which landed in the hands of receiver Scott MacDonald to give West Virginia the lead. With 3:49 to go, the Wolfpack tried one last desperate drive at their own 11 with a new quarterback, Dave Buckley. The Wolfpack managed to get to the WVU 33 and seemed to have a chance at a tie. But Buckley was sacked on the next play, which stuck them back at the 44, and a penalty on the next play sealed their fate. Ted Brown ran for 159 yards on 21 carries for NC State. Kendra went 12 of 28 for 202 yards and two touchdowns for WVU, and was named MVP. Despite having jumped out to a 10–0 lead, NC State was shut out in the second half.

== Aftermath ==
Both coaches left for other jobs after this game, Holtz to the Jets and Bowden to Florida State. The Wolfpack went to two more bowl games in the decade. The Mountaineers did not return to a bowl game until 1981.

As for the coaching matchup, both Holtz and Bowden would meet again less than 20 year later when Holtz's Notre Dame Fighting Irish beat Bowden's Florida State Seminoles 31-24 in the Game of the Century contest. The next year, the Seminoles beat the Irish 23-16, and again in the 1996 Orange Bowl (January), where they won 31-26.

== Statistics ==
Statistics	WVU	NC State
First downs	20	23
Yards rushing	223	210
Yards passing	202	103
Total yards	425	313
Punts-Average	8-42.0	6-40.0
Fumbles-Lost	1-1	1-1
Interceptions	0	1
Penalties-Yards	8-80	7-59
