= 1975 NCAA Division I football rankings =

- Season: 1975
- Bowl season: 1975–76 bowl games
- Preseason No. 1: Oklahoma
- End of season champions: Oklahoma

Two human polls comprised the 1975 National Collegiate Athletic Association (NCAA) Division I football rankings. Unlike most sports, college football's governing body, the NCAA, does not bestow a national championship, instead that title is bestowed by one or more different polling agencies. There are two main weekly polls that begin in the preseason—the AP Poll and the Coaches Poll.

== Legend ==
	Increase in ranking
	Decrease in ranking
	Not ranked previous week
	National champion
(#–#)	Win–loss record
(Italics)	Number of first place votes
т	Tied with team above or below also with this symbol

== AP Poll ==
	Preseason Aug	Week 1 Sep 8	Week 2 Sep 15	Week 3 Sep 22	Week 4 Sep 29	Week 5 Oct 6	Week 6 Oct 13	Week 7 Oct 20	Week 8 Oct 27	Week 9 Nov 3	Week 10 Nov 10	Week 11 Nov 17	Week 12 Nov 24	Week 13 Dec 1	Week 14 (Final) Jan 2	
1.	Oklahoma (54)	Oklahoma (0–0) (51)	Oklahoma (1–0) (53)	Oklahoma (2–0) (56)	Oklahoma (3–0) (30)	Ohio State (4–0) (47)	Ohio State (5–0) (42)	Ohio State (6–0) (51)	Ohio State (7–0) (50)	Ohio State (8–0) (38)	Ohio State (9–0) (49)	Ohio State (10–0) (46)	Ohio State (11–0) (56)	Ohio State (11–0) (50)	Oklahoma (11–1) (54 ½)	1.
2.	Alabama (1)	Michigan (0–0) (1)	Michigan (1–0) (2)	Ohio State (2–0) (3)	Ohio State (3–0) (26)	Oklahoma (4–0) (14)	Oklahoma (5–0) (12)	Oklahoma (6–0) (8)	Oklahoma (7–0) (8)	Oklahoma (8–0) (19)	Nebraska (9–0) (8)	Nebraska (10–0) (11)	Texas A&M (9–0) (1)	Texas A&M (10–0) (7)	Arizona State (12–0) (5)	2.
3.	Michigan (1)	Ohio State (0–0) (3)	Ohio State (1–0) (2)	USC (2–0) (1)	USC (3–0) (1)	USC (4–0) (1)	USC (5–0) (1)	USC (6–0)	Nebraska (7–0) (2)	Nebraska (8–0) (6)	Texas A&M (8–0) (1)	Texas A&M (9–0) (1)	Oklahoma (10–1) (2)	Oklahoma (10–1) (1)	Alabama (11–1) (3 ½)	3.
4.	Ohio State (3)	USC (0–0)	USC (1–0)	Nebraska (2–0)	Nebraska (3–0)	Nebraska (4–0)	Nebraska (5–0)	Nebraska (6–0)	USC (7–0) (1)	Texas A&M (7–0)	Michigan (7–0–2)	Michigan (8–0–2)	Alabama (9–1)	Alabama (10–1)	Ohio State (11–1)	4.
5.	USC	Missouri (1–0) (1)	Missouri (1–0)	Missouri (2–0)	Missouri (3–0)	Texas (4–0)	Texas A&M (5–0)	Texas A&M (6–0)	Texas A&M (7–0)	Alabama (7–1)	Alabama (8–1)	Alabama (9–1)	Texas (9–1)	Michigan (8–1–2)	UCLA (9–2–1)	5.
6.	Penn State (1)	Nebraska (0–0)	Nebraska (1–0)	Texas (2–0)	Texas A&M (3–0) (1)	Texas A&M (4–0)	Alabama (4–1)	Alabama (5–1)	Alabama (6–1)	Michigan (6–0–2)	Oklahoma (8–1)	Texas (9–1)	Michigan (8–1–2)	Nebraska (10–1)	Texas (10–2)	6.
7.	Nebraska	Auburn (0–0)	Penn State (2–0)	Notre Dame (2–0)	Texas (3–0)	Alabama (3–1)	Michigan (3–0–2)	Michigan (4–0–2)	Michigan (5–0–2)	Texas (7–1)	Texas (8–1)	Oklahoma (9–1)	Nebraska (10–1)	Arizona State (11–0)	Arkansas (10–2)	7.
8.	Auburn	Texas A&M (0–0)	Texas (1–0)	Texas A&M (2–0)	Notre Dame (3–0)	Michigan (2–0–2)	Texas (4–1)	Texas (5–1)	Texas (6–1)	Penn State (8–1)	Arizona State (9–0)	Arizona State (10–0)	Arizona State (10–0)	Penn State (9–2)	Michigan (8–2–2)	8.
9.	Texas A&M	Notre Dame (0–0)	Notre Dame (1–0)	Michigan (1–0–1)	Alabama (2–1)	Penn State (4–1)	Penn State (5–1)	Penn State (6–1)	Penn State (7–1)	USC (7–1)	Notre Dame (7–2)	Colorado (8–2)	Colorado (9–2)	Texas (9–2)	Nebraska (10–2)	9.
10.	Notre Dame	Penn State (1–0)	Tennessee (1–0)	UCLA (2–0)	Penn State (3–1)	West Virginia (4–0)	Missouri (4–1)	Colorado (5–1)	Arizona State (7–0)	Arizona State (8–0)	Colorado (7–2)	Penn State (8–2)	Penn State (9–2)	Colorado (9–2)	Penn State (9–3)	10.
11.	Texas	Michigan State (0–0)	Texas A&M (1–0)	Alabama (1–1)	West Virginia (3–0)	Arizona State (4–0)	Arizona State (5–0)	Arizona State (6–0)	Florida (6–1)	Florida (7–1)	Penn State (8–2)	Arizona (8–1)	California (8–3)	UCLA (8–2–1)	Texas A&M (10–2)	11.
12.	Michigan State	Texas (0–0)	UCLA (1–0)	Penn State (2–1)	Michigan (1–0–2)	Missouri (3–1)	Colorado (4–1)	Florida (5–1)	Missouri (5–2)	Notre Dame (6–2)	Arizona (7–1)	Florida (8–2)	Arizona (9–1)	Georgia (9–2)	Miami (OH) (11–1)	12.
13.	NC State	Alabama (0–1)	Florida (1–0)	Arizona State (2–0)	UCLA (2–0–1)	Colorado (3–1)	Arizona (4–0)	Arizona (5–0)	UCLA (5–1–1)	San Diego State (8–0)	USC (7–2)	California (7–3)	Florida (8–2)	Florida (9–2)	Maryland (9–2–1)	13.
14.	UCLA	Maryland (1–0)	Alabama (0–1)	West Virginia (2–0)	Arizona State (3–0)	Oklahoma State (4–0)	Florida (4–1)	Notre Dame (5–1)	Maryland (5–1–1)	Colorado (6–2)	Florida (7–2)	UCLA (7–2–1)	UCLA (7–2–1)	California (8–3)	California (8–3)	14.
15.	Florida	NC State (1–0)	Pittsburgh (1–0)	Arizona (1–0)	Oklahoma State (3–0)	Michigan State (3–1) т	Notre Dame (4–1)	Missouri (4–2)	Notre Dame (5–2)	Arizona (6–1)	California (6–3)	Georgia (8–2)	Georgia (8–2)	Arizona (9–2)	Pittsburgh (8–4)	15.
16.	Arizona	UCLA (0–0)	Arkansas (1–0)	Tennessee (1–1)	Tennessee (2–1)	Notre Dame (3–1) т	Tennessee (3–1)	Michigan State (4–2)	Colorado (5–2)	Maryland (5–2–1)	Miami (OH) (8–1)	Miami (OH) (9–1)	Miami (OH) (10–1)	Miami (OH) (10–1)	Colorado (9–3)	16.
17.	Maryland	Arizona (0–0)	Arizona (0–0)	Oklahoma State (2–0)	Arizona (2–0)	Arizona (3–0)	Michigan State (3–2)	Pittsburgh (5–1)	Arizona (5–1)	Miami (OH) (7–1)	Kansas (6–3)	Pittsburgh (7–3)	Maryland (8–2–1)	Maryland (8–2–1)	USC (8–4)	17.
18.	Tennessee	Pittsburgh (1–0)	Arizona State (1–0)	Stanford (0–1–1)	Baylor (1–0–2)	Florida (3–1)	UCLA (3–1–1)	Maryland (5–1–1)	San Diego State (7–0)	California (5–3)	Missouri (6–3)	Missouri (6–4)	Kansas (7–4)	Arkansas (8–2)	Arizona (9–2)	18.
19.	Arkansas	Florida (0–0)	Miami (OH) (1–0)	Florida (1–1)	Colorado (3–0)	Tennessee (2–1)	Maryland (4–1–1)	UCLA (4–1–1)	Miami (OH) (6–1) т	Missouri (5–3)	UCLA (6–2–1)	Arkansas (7–2)	Arkansas (8–2)	Kansas (7–4)	Georgia (9–3)	19.
20.	Stanford	Tennessee (0–0)	West Virginia (1–0)	Maryland (2–1)	Florida (2–1)	Miami (OH) (3–1)	Arkansas (4–1)	South Carolina (5–1)	Oklahoma State (5–2) т	Pittsburgh (6–2)	Georgia (7–2)	Maryland (7–2–1)	San Jose State (9–1)	Pittsburgh (7–4)	West Virginia (9–3)	20.
	Preseason Aug	Week 1 Sep 8	Week 2 Sep 15	Week 3 Sep 22	Week 4 Sep 29	Week 5 Oct 6	Week 6 Oct 13	Week 7 Oct 20	Week 8 Oct 27	Week 9 Nov 3	Week 10 Nov 10	Week 11 Nov 17	Week 12 Nov 24	Week 13 Dec 1	Week 14 (Final) Jan 2	
		Dropped: Arkansas; Stanford	Dropped: Auburn; Maryland; Michigan State; NC State	Dropped: Arkansas; Miami (OH); Pittsburgh	Dropped: Maryland; Stanford	Dropped: Baylor; UCLA	Dropped: Miami (OH); Oklahoma State; West Virginia	Dropped: Arkansas; Tennessee	Dropped: Michigan State; Pittsburgh; South Carolina	Dropped: Oklahoma State; UCLA	Dropped: Maryland; Pittsburgh; San Diego State	Dropped: Kansas; Notre Dame; USC	Dropped: Missouri; Pittsburgh	Dropped: San Jose State	Dropped: Florida; Kansas	

== Coaches Poll ==
For the second year, the final UPI Coaches Poll was released after the bowl games, on January 2, 1976.
Oklahoma received 21 of the 36 first-place votes; Alabama received seven, Arizona State five, and Ohio State three.

	Preseason Aug 30	Week 1 Sep 15	Week 2 Sep 22	Week 3 Sep 29	Week 4 Oct 6	Week 5 Oct 13	Week 6 Oct 20	Week 7 Oct 27	Week 8 Nov 3	Week 9 Nov 10	Week 10 Nov 17	Week 11 Nov 24	Week 12 Dec 1	Week 13 Dec 8	Week 14 (Final) Jan 5	
1.	Oklahoma	Oklahoma (1–0)	Oklahoma (2–0)	Ohio State (3–0)	Ohio State (4–0)	Ohio State (5–0)	Ohio State (6–0)	Ohio State (7–0)	Ohio State (8–0)	Ohio State (9–0)	Ohio State (10–0)	Ohio State (11–0)	Ohio State (11–0)	Ohio State (11–0)	Oklahoma (11–1)	1.
2.	Alabama	Ohio State (1–0)	Ohio State (2–0)	Oklahoma (3–0)	Oklahoma (4–0)	Oklahoma (5–0)	Oklahoma (6–0)	Oklahoma (7–0)	Oklahoma (8–0)	Nebraska (9–0)	Nebraska (10–0)	Texas A&M (9–0)	Texas A&M (10–0)	Oklahoma (10–1)	Arizona State (12–0)	2.
3.	Ohio State	Michigan (1–0)	USC (2–0)	USC (3–0)	USC (4–0)	USC (5–0)	USC (6–0)	Nebraska (7–0)	Nebraska (8–0)	Texas A&M (8–0)	Texas A&M (9–0)	Oklahoma (10–1)	Oklahoma (10–1)	Alabama (10–1)	Alabama (11–1)	3.
4.	USC	USC (1–0)	Nebraska (2–0)	Nebraska (3–0)	Nebraska (4–0)	Nebraska (5–0)	Nebraska (6–0)	USC (7–0)	Texas A&M (7–0)	Michigan (7–0–2)	Alabama (9–1)	Alabama (9–1)	Alabama (10–1)	Michigan (8–1–2)	Ohio State (11–1)	4.
5.	Michigan	Missouri (1–0)	Missouri (2–0)	Missouri (3–0)	Texas (4–0)	Texas A&M (5–0)	Alabama (5–1)	Texas A&M (7–0)	Alabama (7–1)	Alabama (8–1)	Michigan (8–0–2)	Texas (9–1)	Michigan (8–1–2)	Nebraska (10–1)	UCLA (9–2–1)	5.
6.	Auburn	Nebraska (1–0)	Texas (2–0)	Texas A&M (3–0)	Texas A&M (4–0)	Alabama (4–1)	Texas A&M (6–0)	Alabama (6–1)	Michigan (6–0–2)	Texas (8–1)	Oklahoma (9–1)	Nebraska (10–1)	Nebraska (10–1)	Texas A&M (10–1)	Arkansas (10–2)	6.
7.	Nebraska	Texas (1–0)	Texas A&M (2–0)	Texas (3–0)	Alabama (3–1)	Michigan (3–0–2)	Michigan (4–0–2)	Michigan (5–0–2)	Texas (7–1)	Oklahoma (8–1)	Texas (9–1)	Michigan (8–1–2)	Arizona State (11–0)	Arizona State (11–0)	Texas (10–2)	7.
8.	Notre Dame	Penn State (2–0)	Notre Dame (2–0)	Notre Dame (3–0)	Michigan (2–0–2)	Penn State (5–1)	Texas (5–1)	Texas (6–1)	Penn State (8–1)	Arizona State (9–0)	Arizona State (10–0)	Arizona State (10–0)	Penn State (9–2)	Penn State (9–2)	Michigan (8–2–2)	8.
9.	Penn State	Notre Dame (0–0)	UCLA (2–0)	Alabama (2–1)	Penn State (4–1)	Texas (4–1)	Penn State (6–1)	Penn State (7–1)	USC (7–1)	Notre Dame (7–2)	Colorado (8–2)	Penn State (9–2)	Texas (9–2)	Texas (9–2)	Nebraska (10–2)	9.
10.	Texas A&M	Tennessee (1–0)	Michigan (1–0–1)	Penn State (3–1)	Oklahoma State (4–0)	Missouri (4–1)	Colorado (5–1)	Florida (6–1)	Florida (7–1)	Penn State (8–2)	Penn State (8–2)	Colorado (9–2)	Colorado (9–2)	Arkansas (9–2)	Penn State (9–3)	10.
11.	Texas	Texas A&M (1–0)	Alabama (1–1)	Oklahoma State (3–0)	West Virginia (4–0)	Colorado (4–1)	Arizona State (6–0)	Arizona State (7–0)	Arizona State (8–0)	Arizona (7–1)	Arizona (8–1)	Arizona (9–1)	Georgia (9–2)	Colorado (9–2)	Maryland (9–2–1)	11.
12.	Michigan State	Florida (1–0)	Penn State (2–1)	West Virginia (3–0)	Colorado (3–1)	Florida (4–1)	Florida (5–1)	Missouri (5–2)	San Diego State (8–0)	Colorado (7–2)	Florida (8–2)	California (8–3)	UCLA (8–2–1)	Georgia (9–2)	Texas A&M (10–2)	12.
13.	UCLA	UCLA (1–0)	Oklahoma State (2–0)	Arizona State (3–0)	Arizona State (4–0)	Arizona State (5–0)	Arizona (5–0)	UCLA (5–1–1)	Notre Dame (6–2)	California (6–3)	Georgia (8–2)	Florida (8–2)	Florida (9–2)	UCLA (8–2–1)	Arizona (9–2) т	13.
14.	Maryland	Arkansas (1–0)	Arizona State (2–0) т	Michigan (1–0–2)	Arizona (3–0)	Arizona (4–0)	Notre Dame (5–1)	San Diego State (7–0)	Pittsburgh (6–2)	UCLA (6–2–1)	California (7–3)	Georgia (8–2)	California (8–3)	Florida (9–2)	Pittsburgh (8–4) т	14.
15.	Florida	Pittsburgh (1–0)	West Virginia (2–0) т	Baylor (1–0–2)	Notre Dame (3–1)	Notre Dame (4–1)	Missouri (4–2)	Miami (OH) (6–1) т	Maryland (5–2–1) т	Florida (7–2)	UCLA (7–2–1) т	San Jose State (9–1)	Arizona (9–2) т	Arizona (9–2)	California (8–3)	15.
16.	Wisconsin	Arizona State (1–0)	San Diego State (3–0)	Colorado (3–0)	Michigan State (3–1)	Tennessee (3–1)	Pittsburgh (5–1)	Maryland (5–1–1) т	Arizona (6–1) т	Missouri (6–3)	San Jose State (9–1) т	UCLA (7–2–1)	Arkansas (8–2) т	California (8–3)	Miami (OH) (11–1)	16.
17.	NC State	Miami (OH) (1–0)	Colorado (2–0) т	Arizona (2–0)	Florida (3–1)	Pittsburgh (4–1)	San Diego State (7–0)	Oklahoma State (5–2) т	California (5–3) т	USC (7–2) т	Pittsburgh (7–3) т	Arkansas (8–2)	Notre Dame (8–3)	Notre Dame (8–3) т	Notre Dame (8–3) т	17.
18.	Colorado т	Alabama (0–1)	Arizona (1–0) т	San Diego State (4–0)	Missouri (3–1)	San Diego State (6–0)	UCLA (4–1–1)	Notre Dame (5–2)		Arkansas (6–2) т	Arkansas (7–2) т	Tulsa (7–3)	Kansas (7–4) т	Pittsburgh (7–4) т	West Virginia (9–3) т	18.
19.	Houston т	West Virginia (1–0)	Auburn (0–1–1)	UCLA (2–0–1)	San Diego State (5–0)	Miami (OH) (4–1)	Miami (OH) (4–1) т			Kansas (6–3) т	West Virginia (8–2) т	Notre Dame (8–3)	Pittsburgh (7–4) т	Kansas (7–4) т	Georgia (9–3) т	19.
20.	Tennessee	San Diego State (2–0)	Navy (2–0) т; South Carolina (2–0) т	Tennessee (2–1)	Kansas (3–1)		Maryland (5–1–1) т			Georgia (7–2) т	Tulsa (7–3) т	Kansas (7–4)	Tulsa (7–4) т; Maryland (8–2–1) т; Miami (OH) (10–1) т	Tulsa (7–4) т; Maryland (8–2–1) т; Miami (OH) (10–1) т	USC (8–4) т	20.
	Preseason Aug 30	Week 1 Sep 15	Week 2 Sep 22	Week 3 Sep 29	Week 4 Oct 6	Week 5 Oct 13	Week 6 Oct 20	Week 7 Oct 27	Week 8 Nov 3	Week 9 Nov 10	Week 10 Nov 17	Week 11 Nov 24	Week 12 Dec 1	Week 13 Dec 8	Week 14 (Final) Jan 5	
		Dropped: Michigan State; Maryland; Wisconsin; NC State; Colorado; Houston	Dropped: Tennessee; Florida; Arkansas; Pittsburgh; Miami (OH)	Dropped: Auburn; Navy; South Carolina	Dropped: Baylor; UCLA; Tennessee	Dropped: Oklahoma State; West Virginia; Michigan State; Kansas	Dropped: Tennessee	Dropped: Colorado; Arizona; Pittsburgh	Dropped: Missouri; UCLA; Miami (OH); Oklahoma State	Dropped: San Diego State; Pittsburgh; Maryland	Dropped: Notre Dame; Missouri; USC; Kansas	Dropped: Pittsburgh; West Virginia	Dropped: San Jose State	None	Dropped: Colorado; Florida; Kansas; Tulsa	
