= 1975 NAIA Division I football season =

American college football season

- Regular season: August–November 1975
- Postseason: November 29–December 13, 1975
- National Championship: Javelina Stadium; Kingsville, TX
- Champions: Texas A&I (4)

The 1975 NAIA Division I football season was the 20th season of college football sponsored by the NAIA, was the sixth season of play of the top division of the NAIA's two-division structure for football.

The season was played from August to November 1975 and culminated in the 1975 NAIA Division I Champion Bowl, played on December 13, 1975 on the campus of Texas A&I University in Kingsville, Texas. Texas A&I defeated Salem in the Champion Bowl, 37–0, to win their fourth, and second consecutive, NAIA national title.

== Conference realignment ==
=== Conference changes ===
- This was the first season of football for South Atlantic Conference. The league comprised eight teams from North Carolina and South Carolina, with seven being former members of the Carolinas Conference.
- This was the final season of play for the Great Plains Athletic Conference, which disbanded after only four seasons. The seven members, spread across Colorado, Kansas, and Nebraska, would subsequently all depart for other NAIA conferences.

=== Membership changes ===
Team	1974 conference	1975 conference
Catawba	Carolinas	South Atlantic
Elon	Carolinas	South Atlantic
Gardner–Webb	Independent	South Atlantic
Guilford	Carolinas	Independent
Lenoir–Rhyne	Carolinas	South Atlantic
Mars Hill	Carolinas	South Atlantic
Newberry	Independent	South Atlantic
Presbyterian	Independent	South Atlantic

== Conference standings ==
1975 Arkansas Intercollegiate Conference football standings
	Conf.					Overall
Team	W		L		T	W		L		T
No. 2 Henderson State +	5	–	1	–	0	11	–	1	–	0
No. 4 Ouachita Baptist +^	5	–	1	–	0	9	–	2	–	0
Southern Arkansas	4	–	1	–	1	6	–	3	–	1
Central Arkansas	3	–	2	–	1	4	–	6	–	1
Harding	2	–	4	–	0	4	–	6	–	0
Arkansas Tech	1	–	5	–	0	3	–	8	–	0
Arkansas–Monticello	0	–	6	–	0	2	–	8	–	0
+ – Conference co-champions; ^ – NAIA Division I playoff participant; Rankings from NAIA Division I poll

1975 Evergreen Conference football standings
	Conf.					Overall
Team	W		L		T	W		L		T
No. 5 Oregon College $^	6	–	0	–	0	9	–	1	–	0
Central Washington	4	–	2	–	0	5	–	4	–	0
Southern Oregon	3	–	3	–	0	6	–	4	–	0
Western Washington	3	–	3	–	0	3	–	5	–	0
Eastern Oregon	2	–	4	–	0	5	–	4	–	0
Eastern Washington	2	–	3	–	0	3	–	6	–	0
Oregon Tech	1	–	5	–	0	3	–	5	–	0
$ – Conference champion; ^ – NAIA Division I playoff participant; Rankings from NAIA Division I poll

1975 Great Plains Athletic Conference football standings
	Conf.					Overall
Team	W		L		T	W		L		T
Northern Colorado $	5	–	0	–	0	8	–	1	–	0
Pittsburg State	3	–	2	–	0	4	–	4	–	2
Southern Colorado	3	–	2	–	0	4	–	5	–	0
Washburn	2	–	3	–	0	5	–	5	–	0
Fort Hays State	2	–	3	–	0	3	–	7	–	0
Emporia State	0	–	5	–	0	1	–	9	–	0
Kearney State *	0	–	0	–	0	6	–	3	–	0
$ – Conference champion; * – ineligible for conference standings

1975 Gulf South Conference football standings
	Conf.					Overall
Team	W		L		T	W		L		T
Nicholls State $	7	–	2	–	0	8	–	2	–	0
No. 6 Livingston ^	6	–	2	–	0	10	–	3	–	0
No. 11 Jacksonville State	5	–	3	–	0	7	–	4	–	0
Troy State	5	–	3	–	0	6	–	4	–	0
Delta State	5	–	4	–	0	6	–	4	–	0
North Alabama	4	–	4	–	0	6	–	4	–	0
Mississippi College	2	–	5	–	0	6	–	5	–	0
Southeastern Louisiana	2	–	6	–	0	4	–	7	–	0
Tennessee–Martin	1	–	7	–	0	2	–	8	–	0
$ – Conference champion; ^ – NCAA Division II playoff participant; Rankings from NCAA Division II AP poll for Livingston and NAIA Division I poll for Jacksonville State

1975 Lone Star Conference football standings
	Conf.					Overall
Team	W		L		T	W		L		T
No. 1 Texas A&I $^	9	–	0	–	0	12	–	0	–	0
No. 6 Angelo State	7	–	1	–	1	8	–	2	–	1
No. T–17 Southwest Texas State	7	–	2	–	0	7	–	3	–	0
No. T–19 East Texas State	6	–	3	–	0	8	–	3	–	0
No. 16 Abilene Christian	5	–	3	–	1	6	–	3	–	1
Howard Payne	4	–	5	–	0	5	–	5	–	1
Sam Houston State	3	–	6	–	0	3	–	7	–	0
Stephen F. Austin	1	–	8	–	0	2	–	8	–	0
Sul Ross	1	–	8	–	0	1	–	10	–	0
Tarleton State	1	–	8	–	0	1	–	10	–	0
$ – Conference champion; ^ – NAIA Division I playoff participant; Rankings from NAIA Division I poll

1975 Minnesota Intercollegiate Athletic Conference football standings
	Conf.					Overall
Team	W		L		T	W		L		T
No. 13 Saint John's (MN) $	6	–	0	–	1	8	–	1	–	1
Minnesota–Duluth	6	–	1	–	0	8	–	2	–	0
Hamline	4	–	3	–	0	5	–	5	–	0
Gustavus Adolphus	4	–	3	–	0	4	–	5	–	0
St. Olaf	3	–	3	–	1	5	–	3	–	1
Concordia–Moorhead	3	–	4	–	0	5	–	4	–	0
St. Thomas (MN)	3	–	4	–	0	3	–	6	–	0
Augsburg	1	–	6	–	0	2	–	8	–	0
Macalester	0	–	7	–	0	0	–	10	–	0
$ – Conference champion; Rankings from NAIA Division I poll

1975 Nebraska College Conference football standings
	Conf.					Overall
Team	W		L		T	W		L		T
Kearney State $	3	–	0	–	0	6	–	3	–	0
Chadron State	2	–	1	–	0	6	–	3	–	0
Wayne State (NE)	1	–	2	–	0	5	–	5	–	0
Peru State	0	–	3	–	0	4	–	6	–	0
$ – Conference champion

1975 Northern Intercollegiate Conference football standings
	Conf.					Overall
Team	W		L		T	W		L		T
No. 10 Minnesota Morris $	6	–	0	–	0	8	–	1	–	0
St. Cloud State	5	–	1	–	0	7	–	3	–	0
Michigan Tech	4	–	2	–	0	7	–	2	–	0
Winona State	3	–	3	–	0	5	–	4	–	0
Moorhead State	2	–	4	–	0	2	–	7	–	0
Bemidji State	1	–	5	–	0	2	–	7	–	0
Southwest State (MN)	0	–	6	–	0	1	–	7	–	0
$ – Conference champion; Rankings from NAIA Division I poll

1975 Oklahoma Intercollegiate Conference football standings
	Conf.					Overall
Team	W		L		T	W		L		T
No. 8 East Central $	5	–	0	–	0	9	–	3	–	1
Central State (OK)	4	–	1	–	0	7	–	4	–	0
Northeastern State	2	–	3	–	0	7	–	3	–	0
SE Oklahoma State	2	–	3	–	0	6	–	4	–	0
SW Oklahoma State	2	–	3	–	0	5	–	5	–	0
NW Oklahoma State	0	–	5	–	0	2	–	9	–	0
$ – Conference champion; Rankings from NAIA Division I poll

1975 Rocky Mountain Athletic Conference football standings
	Conf.					Overall
Team	W		L		T	W		L		T
Western State (CO) $	7	–	0	–	0	9	–	1	–	0
No. 15 Adams State	6	–	1	–	0	6	–	3	–	0
Colorado Mines	5	–	2	–	0	6	–	4	–	0
Fort Lewis	4	–	3	–	0	6	–	3	–	0
Western New Mexico	3	–	4	–	0	4	–	5	–	0
Westminster (UT)	2	–	5	–	0	4	–	5	–	0
Southern Utah	1	–	6	–	0	3	–	6	–	0
Mesa	0	–	7	–	0	0	–	8	–	0
$ – Conference champion; Rankings from NAIA Division I poll

1975 South Atlantic Conference football standings
	Conf.					Overall
Team	W		L		T	W		L		T
Lenoir Rhyne $	6	–	0	–	1	7	–	3	–	1
Presbyterian	3	–	2	–	1	3	–	6	–	1
Newberry	4	–	3	–	0	5	–	5	–	0
Mars Hill	3	–	3	–	0	7	–	3	–	0
Elon	3	–	3	–	0	5	–	6	–	0
Carson–Newman	2	–	4	–	0	6	–	5	–	0
Catawba	2	–	4	–	0	4	–	6	–	0
Gardner–Webb	1	–	5	–	0	2	–	6	–	0
$ – Conference champion

1975 Southwestern Athletic Conference football standings
	Conf.					Overall
Team	W		L		T	W		L		T
No. 4 Grambling State *	4	–	2	–	0	10	–	2	–	0
No. 9 Southern +	4	–	2	–	0	9	–	3	–	0
No. 7 Jackson State +	4	–	2	–	0	7	–	3	–	0
No. T–19 Alcorn State	3	–	3	–	0	6	–	3	–	1
Mississippi Valley State	3	–	3	–	0	6	–	4	–	0
Texas Southern	2	–	4	–	0	4	–	6	–	0
Prairie View A&M	1	–	5	–	0	3	–	7	–	0
$ – Conference champion; * – Grambling State vacated a share of the conference championship.; Rankings from NCAA Division II AP poll for Grambling State and NAIA Division I poll for Southern and Jackson State

1975 West Virginia Intercollegiate Athletic Conference football standings
	Conf.					Overall
Team	W		L		T	W		L		T
Northern Division
No. 3 Salem xy$^	4	–	0	–	0	11	–	1	–	0
Shepherd	2	–	2	–	0	8	–	3	–	0
Fairmont State	2	–	2	–	0	6	–	4	–	0
West Liberty State	2	–	2	–	0	3	–	4	–	2
West Virginia Wesleyan	0	–	4	–	0	5	–	5	–	0
Southern Division
Concord xy	4	–	0	–	0	6	–	5	–	0
West Virginia State	2	–	2	–	0	3	–	6	–	1
Glenville State	2	–	2	–	0	2	–	6	–	1
West Virginia Tech	1	–	3	–	0	2	–	7	–	0
Bluefield State	1	–	3	–	0	1	–	9	–	0
Championship: Salem 27, Concord 10
$ – Conference champion; x – Division champion/co-champions; y – Championship game participant; ^ – NAIA Division I playoff participant Conference standings based on power ratings; Rankings from NAIA Division I poll

1975 Wisconsin State University Conference football standings
	Conf.					Overall
Team	W		L		T	W		L		T
No. 14 Wisconsin–River Falls +	7	–	1	–	0	8	–	2	–	0
Wisconsin–La Crosse +	7	–	1	–	0	8	–	3	–	0
Wisconsin–Whitewater +	7	–	1	–	0	8	–	3	–	0
Wisconsin–Stevens Point	4	–	4	–	0	4	–	6	–	0
Wisconsin–Eau Claire	3	–	5	–	0	4	–	6	–	0
Wisconsin–Oshkosh	3	–	5	–	0	3	–	7	–	0
Wisconsin–Stout	3	–	5	–	0	3	–	7	–	0
Wisconsin–Platteville	2	–	6	–	0	3	–	7	–	0
Wisconsin–Superior	0	–	8	–	0	1	–	9	–	0
+ – Conference co-champions; Rankings from NAIA Division I poll

1975 NAIA Division I independents football records
	Conf.			Overall
Team	W	L	T	W		L		T
No. T–17 Guilford		–		8	–	2	–	0
Cameron		–		8	–	2	–	1
No. 12 Eastern New Mexico		–		8	–	3	–	0
Wofford		–		7	–	3	–	1
Kentucky State		–		7	–	4	–	0
Langston		–		5	–	5	–	0
New Mexico Highlands		–		2	–	6	–	0
Rankings from NAIA Division I poll

== Postseason ==
Semifinals; November 29–December 6, 1975
Ouachita Baptist*	7
Salem	21
Oregon College	0
Texas A&I*	37

1975 NAIA Champion Bowl; December 13, 1975; Kingsville, TX
Salem	0
Texas A&I*	37

== See also ==
- 1975 NAIA Division II football season
- 1975 NCAA Division I football season
- 1975 NCAA Division II football season
- 1975 NCAA Division III football season
