= 1975 college football season =

1975 college football season may refer to:

- 1975 NCAA Division I football season
- 1975 NCAA Division II football season
- 1975 NCAA Division III football season
- 1975 NAIA Division I football season
- 1975 NAIA Division II football season
