= 1975 Little All-America college football team =

American college football all-star team

The 1975 Little All-America college football team, also known as the College Division All-America football team, is composed of college football players from small colleges and universities who were selected by the Associated Press (AP) as the best players at each position. The AP selected three teams, each consisting of separate offensive and defensive platoons.

== First team ==
Position	Player	Team
Offense
Quarterback	Lynn Heiber	IUP
Running back	Vince Allen	Indiana State
Running back	Bill Deutsch	North Dakota
Running back	Terry Egerdahl	Minnesota–Duluth
Wide receiver	Sammy White	Grambling State
Tight end	David Hill	Texas A&I
Tackle	Steve Musulin	Guilford
Tackle	Mike Timmermans	Northern Iowa
Guard	Ned Deane	UMass
Guard	Mark Law	Hillsdale
Center	Kevin Martell	New Hampshire
Defense
Defensive end	Willie Lee	Bethune–Cookman
Defensive end	Lawrence Pillers	Alcorn State
Defensive tackle	Larry Czarnecki	Ithaca
Defensive tackle	Bobby Kotzur	Southwest Texas State
Middle guard	Junior Hardin	Eastern Kentucky
Linebacker	Greg Blankenship	Hayward State
Linebacker	Rick Green	Western Kentucky
Linebacker	Bill Linnenkohl	Puget Sound
Defensive back	Ralph Gebhardt	Rochester
Defensive back	James Hunter	Grambling State
Defensive back	Anthony Leonard	Virginia Union

== See also ==
- 1975 College Football All-America Team
