= 1975 East Tennessee State Buccaneers football team =

American college football season

1975 East Tennessee State Buccaneers football
- Conference: Ohio Valley Conference
- Record: 2–8–1 (1–5–1 OVC)
- Head coach: Roy Frazier (3rd season)
- Home stadium: Memorial Stadium

1975 Ohio Valley Conference football standings
	Conf.					Overall
Team	W		L		T	W		L		T
No. 3 Western Kentucky ^	6	–	1	–	0	9	–	1	–	0
Tennessee Tech $	6	–	1	–	0	8	–	3	–	0
No. 12 Eastern Kentucky	5	–	2	–	0	8	–	2	–	1
Murray State	3	–	3	–	1	4	–	5	–	1
Austin Peay	3	–	4	–	0	3	–	8	–	0
Middle Tennessee	2	–	5	–	0	4	–	7	–	0
East Tennessee State	1	–	5	–	1	2	–	8	–	1
Morehead State	1	–	6	–	0	3	–	7	–	0
$ – Conference champion; ^ – NCAA Division II playoff participant; WKU claims a co-championship, while both the OVC and Tennessee Tech state it is not shared; Rankings from Associated Press poll

The 1975 East Tennessee State Buccaneers football team represented East Tennessee State University as a member of the Ohio Valley Conference (OVC) during the 1975 NCAA Division II football season. Led by third-year head coach Roy Frazier, the Buccaneers compiled an overall record of 2–8–1, with a mark of 1–5–1 in conference play, and finished seventh in the OVC.

== Schedule ==
Date	Opponent	Site	Result	Attendance	Source
September 13	at Western Carolina*	E. J. Whitmire Stadium; Cullowhee, NC	W 29–8	8,355	
September 20	at UTEP*	Sun Bowl; El Paso, TX	L 3–6	13,500	
September 27	Eastern Kentucky	Memorial Stadium; Johnson City, TN	L 14–21	8,964	
October 4	at No. 2 Western Kentucky	L. T. Smith Stadium; Bowling Green, KY	L 0–17	14,400	
October 11	Appalachian State*	Memorial Stadium; Johnson City, TN	L 21–44	8,172	
October 18	Chattanooga*	Memorial Stadium; Johnson City, TN	L 13–21	4,536	
October 25	Murray State^{†}	Memorial Stadium; Johnson City, TN	T 10–10	7,751	
November 1	at Tennessee Tech	Tucker Stadium; Cookeville, TN	L 6–48	4,000	
November 8	at Morehead State	Jayne Stadium; Morehead, KY	L 3–7	9,000	
November 15	Middle Tennessee	Memorial Stadium; Johnson City, TN	W 37–20	2,465	
November 22	at Austin Peay	Municipal Stadium; Clarksville, TN	L 21–37	2,100	
*Non-conference game; ^{†}Homecoming; Rankings from AP Poll released prior to the game; Source:
