= Nat Taylor (American football) =

American football player and coach (1927–2006)

Biographical details
- Born: September 14, 1927; Oklahoma City, Oklahoma, U.S.
- Died: September 12, 2006 (aged 78); Baltimore, Maryland, U.S.

Playing career

Football
- 1948: Tennessee A&I
- Position: Quarterback

Coaching career (HC unless noted)

Football
- 1954–?: Maryland State (backfield)
- 1966–1973: Morgan State (backfield)
- 1974–1975: Morgan State
- 1982: Morgan State

Basketball
- 1954–1966: Maryland State
- 1989–1990: Morgan State

Head coaching record
- Overall: 13–17–1 (football); 182–110 (basketball)

Nathaniel Carrington "Birdman" Taylor (September 14, 1927 – September 12, 2006) was an American football player and coach of football and basketball coach. He served as the head football coach at Morgan State University from 1974 to 1975 and again in 1982, compiling a record of 13–17–1. He also served as the head men's basketball coach at the University of Maryland Eastern Shore from 1954 to 1966 and at Morgan State during the 1989–90 season, amassing a career college basketball coaching record of 182–110.

== Head coaching record ==
=== Football ===
| Year | Team | Overall | Conference | Standing | Bowl/playoffs |
|---|---|---|---|---|---|
Morgan State Bears (Mid-Eastern Athletic Conference) (1974–1975)
| 1974 | Morgan State | 5–5 | 4–2 | 4th | |
| 1975 | Morgan State | 4–5–1 | 1–4–1 | 6th | |
Morgan State Bears (NCAA Division II independent) (1982)
| 1982 | Morgan State | 4–7 | | | |
| Morgan State: | | 13–17–1 | 5–6–1 | | |
| Total: | | 13–17–1 | | | |
