= 1975 North Dakota State Bison football team =

American college football season

1975 North Dakota State Bison football
- Conference: North Central Conference
- Record: 2–7 (1–6 NCC)
- Head coach: Ev Kjelbertson (3rd season)
- Home stadium: Dacotah Field

1975 North Central Conference football standings
	Conf.					Overall
Team	W		L		T	W		L		T
No. 7 North Dakota $^	7	–	0	–	0	9	–	1	–	0
No. 10 Northern Iowa ^	6	–	1	–	0	9	–	3	–	0
Augustana (SD)	5	–	2	–	0	7	–	3	–	0
South Dakota State	4	–	3	–	0	7	–	4	–	0
Mankato State	2	–	5	–	0	3	–	6	–	0
Morningside	2	–	5	–	0	3	–	6	–	0
South Dakota	1	–	6	–	0	3	–	8	–	0
North Dakota State	1	–	6	–	0	2	–	7	–	0
$ – Conference champion; ^ – NCAA Division II playoff participant; Rankings from AP Poll

The 1975 North Dakota State Bison football team was an American football team that represented North Dakota State University during the 1975 NCAA Division II football season as a member of the North Central Conference. In their third year under head coach Ev Kjelbertson, the team compiled a 2–7 record.

== Schedule ==
Date	Opponent	Site	Result	Attendance	Source
September 6	at Nebraska–Omaha*	Al F. Caniglia Field; Omaha, NE	L 3–10	7,108	
September 20	Montana State*	Dacotah Field; Fargo, ND	W 13–6	7,400	
September 27	Northern Iowa	Dacotah Field; Fargo, ND	L 16–23	3,600	
October 4	at South Dakota State	Coughlin–Alumni Stadium; Brookings, SD (rivalry)	L 8–13	4,197	
October 11	at Augustana (SD)	Howard Wood Field; Sioux Falls, SD	L 14–27	6,516	
October 18	No. 6 North Dakota^{†}	Dacotah Field; Fargo, ND (Nickel Trophy)	L 17–34	13,800	
October 25	Mankato State	Dacotah Field; Fargo, ND	L 14–17	2,100	
November 1	South Dakota	Dacotah Field; Fargo, ND	W 28–3	2,150	
November 8	at Morningside	Roberts Field; Sioux City, IA	L 14–17	624	
*Non-conference game; ^{†}Homecoming; Rankings from AP Poll released prior to the game
