= Ev Kjelbertson =

American football and baseball coach (1935–2018)

Biographical details
- Born: February 20, 1935; Devils Lake, North Dakota, U.S.
- Died: November 3, 2018 (aged 83); Fargo, North Dakota, U.S.

Playing career

Football
- mid 1950s: Jamestown

Coaching career (HC unless noted)

Football
- 1958–1963: LaMoure HS (ND)
- 1964–1965: North Dakota State (GA)
- 1966: North Dakota State (freshmen)
- 1967–1972: North Dakota State (DL)
- 1973–1975: North Dakota State

Baseball
- 1966–1968: North Dakota State

Head coaching record
- Overall: 17–13 (college football); 29–31 (college baseball); 37–9–1 (high school football)

Accomplishments and honors

Championships
- Football; 2 NCC (1973–1974)

Everett Kjelbertson (February 20, 1935 – November 3, 2018) was an American football and baseball coach. He served as the head football coach at North Dakota State University from 1973 to 1975, compiling a record of 17–13. Prior to serving as head coach, Kjelbertson served as an assistant with the Bison from 1964 to 1972 and as head football coach of LaMoure High School from 1958 to 1963, where he tallied a mark of 37–9–1. Kjelbertson resigned as head coach at North Dakota State at the conclusion of their 1975 season. He played college football at Jamestown College, from which he graduated in 1958.

== Head coaching record ==
=== College football ===
Year	Team	Overall	Conference	Standing	Bowl/playoffs
North Dakota State Bison (North Central Conference) (1973–1975)
1973	North Dakota State	8–2	6–1	T–1st	
1974	North Dakota State	7–4	5–2	T–1st	
1975	North Dakota State	2–7	1–6	T–7th	
North Dakota State:		17–13	12–9		
Total:		17–13			
National championship Conference title Conference division title or championship game berth
