= 1975 South Dakota Coyotes football team =

American college football season

1975 South Dakota Coyotes football
- Conference: North Central Conference
- Record: 3–8 (1–6 NCC)
- Head coach: Beanie Cooper (1st season)
- Home stadium: Inman Field

1975 North Central Conference football standings
	Conf.					Overall
Team	W		L		T	W		L		T
No. 7 North Dakota $^	7	–	0	–	0	9	–	1	–	0
No. 10 Northern Iowa ^	6	–	1	–	0	9	–	3	–	0
Augustana (SD)	5	–	2	–	0	7	–	3	–	0
South Dakota State	4	–	3	–	0	7	–	4	–	0
Mankato State	2	–	5	–	0	3	–	6	–	0
Morningside	2	–	5	–	0	3	–	6	–	0
South Dakota	1	–	6	–	0	3	–	8	–	0
North Dakota State	1	–	6	–	0	2	–	7	–	0
$ – Conference champion; ^ – NCAA Division II playoff participant; Rankings from AP Poll

The 1975 South Dakota Coyotes football team represented the University of South Dakota as a member of the North Central Conference (NCC) during the 1975 NCAA Division II football season. Led by first-year head coach Beanie Cooper, the Coyotes compiled an overall record of 3–8 with a mark of 1–6 in conference play, trying for seventh place in the NCC.

== Schedule ==
Date	Opponent	Site	Result	Attendance	Source
September 6	Cameron*	Inman Field; Vermillion, SD	W 43–14	7,200	
September 13	at Montana*	Dornblaser Field; Missoula, MT	L 17–51	6,100–6,128	
September 20	at Wisconsin*	Camp Randall Stadium; Madison, WI	L 7–48	65,566	
September 27	Wisconsin–River Falls*	Inman Field; Vermillion, SD	W 14–12	3,800	
October 4	Augustana (SD)	Inman Field; Vermillion, SD	L 24–31	8,000	
October 11	Morningside	Inman Field; Vermillion, SD	L 29–30	12,000	
October 18	at South Dakota State	Coughlin–Alumni Stadium; Brookings, SD (rivalry)	L 22–24	15,866	
October 25	No. 6 North Dakota	Inman Field; Vermillion, SD (Sitting Bull Trophy)	L 17–27	3,000	
November 1	at North Dakota State	Dacotah Field; Fargo, ND	L 3–28	2,150	
November 8	at Northern Iowa	O. R. Latham Stadium; Cedar Falls, IA	L 19–45	6,450	
November 15	Mankato State	Inman Field; Vermillion, SD	W 34–30	3,000	
*Non-conference game; Rankings from AP Poll released prior to the game
