= Hoover J. Wright =

American football and track and field coach

Biographical details
- Born: July 23, 1928; Hebron, Maryland, U.S.
- Died: March 7, 2003 (aged 74); Cypress, Texas, U.S.

Coaching career (HC unless noted)
- 1955–1960: Paul Quinn
- 1961–1965: Prairie View A&M (assistant)
- 1966–1968: Prairie View A&M
- 1973–1979: Prairie View A&M

Hoover John Wright Sr. (July 23, 1928 – March 7, 2003) was an American football and track and field coach. He served as the head football coach at Paul Quinn College in Paul Quinn College from 1955 to 1960 and two stints at the head football coach at Prairie View A&M University in Prairie View, Texas, from 1966 to 1968 and 1973 to 1979.

== Football coaching career ==
=== Early coaching posts ===
Wright's coaching career began at Shorter College in North Little Rock, Arkansas. At Shorter, he was head football coach, men's and women's basketball coach, and track coach. His next post was at Paul Quinn College where he was the athletic director and head football coach.

=== Prairie View A&M ===
Wright served two stints as the head football coach at Prairie View A&M University in Prairie View, Texas, from 1966 to 1968 and 1973 to 1979. His record at Prairie View was 31–68–2.

== Track and field ==
=== Honors ===
Wright also found success as a track and field coach at Prairie View. He was the head coach of the programs for over 40 years and his teams secured two NAIA Indoor titles and one NAIA outdoor title. In 2005, he was inducted into the USTFCCCA Hall of Fame. The school has since honored him by naming their annual track meet after his legacy.

He served as the meet referee of the NCAA National Championship track meet in 1987. He was also placed in the Drake Relays Hall of Fame in 1986 for his excellence as a coach.

=== Overcoming tragedy ===
At age 71, Wright was seriously injured during a bus crash on the way to a track meet where four of his athletes were killed and five were seriously injured. Later that season, Wright was able lead his team to put the tragedy behind them by defending their Southwestern Athletic Conference indoor track championship.

== Education and death ==
Wright earned a bachelor's degree from Maryland State College—now known as University of Maryland Eastern Shore—in 1948 and a master's degree from Pennsylvania State University. He also completed post-graduate work at the University of Iowa and the University of North Texas.

Wright died on March 7, 2003, at his home in Cypress, Texas.

== Head coaching record ==
=== Football ===
Year	Team	Overall	Conference	Standing	Bowl/playoffs
Prairie View A&M Panthers (Southwestern Athletic Conference) (1966–1968)
1966	Prairie View A&M	5–3–1	3–3–1	T–5th	
1967	Prairie View A&M	5–5	2–5	7th	
1968	Prairie View A&M	4–6	2–5	6th	
Prairie View A&M Panthers (Southwestern Athletic Conference) (1973–1979)
1973	Prairie View A&M	2–6–1	0–6	7th	
1974	Prairie View A&M	0–10	0–6	7th	
1975	Prairie View A&M	3–7	1–5	7th	
1976	Prairie View A&M	6–5	3–3	T–4th	
1977	Prairie View A&M	3–8	1–5	7th	
1978	Prairie View A&M	3–7	1–5	7th	
1979	Prairie View A&M	0–11	0–6	7th	
Prairie View A&M:		31–68–2	13–49–1		
Total:					
