= William Faircloth =

American football player and coach (born 1942)

Biographical details
- Born: August 8, 1942

Playing career

Football
- 1961–1963: Wake Forest
- Position: Offensive lineman

Coaching career (HC unless noted)

Football
- 1966–1972: Catawba (assistant)
- 1973–1975: Catawba
- 1976–1977: Duke (assistant)
- 1978–1982: Wake Forest (assistant)

Administrative career (AD unless noted)
- 1983–2016: Wake Forest (assistant AD for football)

Head coaching record
- Overall: 14–15–1

William Faircloth (born August 8, 1942) is a former American college football player and coach. He served as the head football coach at Catawba College in Salisbury, North Carolina from 1973 to 1975, compiling a record of 14–15–1.

== Head coaching record ==
Year	Team	Overall	Conference	Standing	Bowl/playoffs
Catawba Indians (Carolinas Conference) (1973–1974)
1973	Catawba	5–5	1–3	4th	
1974	Catawba	5–4–1	1–2–1	3rd	
Catawba Indians (South Atlantic Conference) (1975)
1975	Catawba	4–6	2–4	T–6th	
Catawba:		14–15–1	4–9–1		
Total:		14–15–1			
