= 1975 Middle Tennessee Blue Raiders football team =

American college football season

1975 Middle Tennessee Blue Raiders football
- Conference: Ohio Valley Conference
- Record: 4–7 (3–4 OVC)
- Head coach: Ben Hurt (1st season)
- Captains: Boyd; Emert; Woodfork
- Home stadium: Horace Jones Field

1975 Ohio Valley Conference football standings
| | Conf. | | | | | Overall |
| Team | W | | L | | T | W | | L | | T |
|---|---|---|---|---|---|---|---|---|---|---|
| No. 3 Western Kentucky ^ | 6 | – | 1 | – | 0 | 9 | – | 1 | – | 0 |
| Tennessee Tech $ | 6 | – | 1 | – | 0 | 8 | – | 3 | – | 0 |
| No. 12 Eastern Kentucky | 5 | – | 2 | – | 0 | 8 | – | 2 | – | 1 |
| Murray State | 3 | – | 3 | – | 1 | 4 | – | 5 | – | 1 |
| Austin Peay | 3 | – | 4 | – | 0 | 3 | – | 8 | – | 0 |
| Middle Tennessee | 2 | – | 5 | – | 0 | 4 | – | 7 | – | 0 |
| East Tennessee State | 1 | – | 5 | – | 1 | 2 | – | 8 | – | 1 |
| Morehead State | 1 | – | 6 | – | 0 | 3 | – | 7 | – | 0 |
$ – Conference champion; ^ – NCAA Division II playoff participant; WKU claims a co-championship, while both the OVC and Tennessee Tech state it is not shared; Rankings from Associated Press poll

The 1975 Middle Tennessee Blue Raiders football team represented Middle Tennessee State University—as a member of the Ohio Valley Conference (OVC) during the 1975 NCAA Division II football season. Led by first-year head coach Ben Hurt, the Blue Raiders compiled a record an overall record of 4–7 with a mark of 3–4 in conference play. The team's captains were Boyd, Emert, and Woodfork.

== Schedule ==
| Date | Opponent | Site | Result | Attendance | Source |
|---|---|---|---|---|---|
| September 6 | vs. Tennessee State* | Dudley Field; Nashville, TN | L 14–21 | 18,500–19,000 | |
| September 13 | Carson–Newman* | Horace Jones Field; Murfreesboro, TN | W 22–21 | 8,100 | |
| September 27 | at Morehead State | Jayne Stadium; Morehead, KY | W 12–10 | 8,500 | |
| October 4 | at Chattanooga* | Chamberlain Field; Chattanooga, TN | L 10–27 | 8,500 | |
| October 11 | Eastern Kentucky | Horace Jones Field; Murfreesboro, TN | L 24–34 | 9,700 | |
| October 18 | Murray State | Horace Jones Field; Murfreesboro, TN | W 17–5 | 7,300 | |
| October 25 | at Austin Peay | Clarksville Municipal Stadium; Clarksville, TN | L 13–17 | 4,000 | |
| November 1 | at Western Carolina* | Whitmire Stadium; Cullowhee, NC | W 44–28 | 9,643 | |
| November 8 | No. 6 Western Kentucky | Horace Jones Field; Murfreesboro, TN (rivalry) | L 10–24 | 11,500 | |
| November 15 | at East Tennessee State | Memorial Stadium; Johnson City, TN | L 20–37 | 2,465 | |
| November 22 | at Tennessee Tech | Horace Jones Field; Murfreesboro, TN | L 3–30 | 9,750 | |
*Non-conference game; Rankings from AP Poll released prior to the game

== After the season ==
=== NFL draft ===
The following Blue Raiders were selected in the 1976 NFL draft following the season.

| Round | Pick | Player | Position | NFL club |
|---|---|---|---|---|
| 8 | 226 | Bobby Joe Easter | Running back | Buffalo Bills |
| 14 | 392 | Tony Williams | Wide receiver | Buffalo Bills |
