= 1975 North Carolina Central Eagles football team =

American college football season

1975 North Carolina Central Eagles football
- Conference: Mid-Eastern Athletic Conference
- Record: 5–4–1 (3–2–1 MEAC)
- Head coach: Willie Smith (3rd season)
- Home stadium: O'Kelly Stadium

1975 Mid-Eastern Athletic Conference football standings
	Conf.					Overall
Team	W		L		T	W		L		T
South Carolina State +	5	–	1	–	0	8	–	2	–	1
North Carolina A&T +	5	–	1	–	0	8	–	3	–	0
Howard	4	–	2	–	0	8	–	3	–	0
North Carolina Central	3	–	2	–	1	5	–	4	–	1
Delaware State	2	–	4	–	0	5	–	5	–	0
Morgan State	1	–	4	–	1	4	–	5	–	1
Maryland Eastern Shore	0	–	6	–	0	0	–	10	–	0
+ – Conference co-champions

The 1975 North Carolina Central Eagles football team represented North Carolina Central University as a member of the Mid-Eastern Athletic Conference (MEAC) during the 1975 NCAA Division II football season. Led by third-year head coach Willie Smith, the Eagles compiled an overall record of 5–4–1, with a mark of 3–2–1 in conference play, and finished fourth in the MEAC.

It was their first season at the brand new O'Kelly–Riddick Stadium, which replaced the off campus Durham County Memorial Stadium as their football stadium.

== Schedule ==
Date	Opponent	Site	Result	Attendance	Source
September 13	Savannah State*	O'Kelly Stadium; Durham, NC	W 30–0	7,500	
September 20	at Winston-Salem State*	Bowman Gray Stadium; Winston-Salem, NC	W 27–10		
September 27	Alcorn State*	O'Kelly Stadium; Durham, NC	L 7–54		
October 4	Morgan State	O'Kelly Stadium; Durham, NC	T 20–20		
October 18	Delaware State	O'Kelly Stadium; Durham, NC	W 16–14		
October 25	at Maryland Eastern Shore	Princess Anne, MD	W 14–0		
November 1	South Carolina State	O'Kelly Stadium; Durham, NC (rivalry)	W 6–3	12,500	
November 8	at Johnson C. Smith*	American Legion Memorial Stadium; Charlotte, NC	L 14–22		
November 15	Howard	O'Kelly Stadium; Durham, NC	L 10–41	5,000	
November 22	at North Carolina A&T	World War Memorial Stadium; Greensboro, NC (rivalry)	L 16–34	14,000	
*Non-conference game
