= 1975 Northern Iowa Panthers football team =

American college football season

1975 Northern Iowa Panthers football

NCAA Division II Quarterfinal, L 12–14 vs. Western Kentucky
- Conference: North Central Conference
- Record: 9–3 (6–1 NCC)
- Head coach: Stan Sheriff (16th season)
- Defensive coordinator: Dennis Remmert (5th season)
- Home stadium: O. R. Latham Stadium

1975 North Central Conference football standings
	Conf.					Overall
Team	W		L		T	W		L		T
No. 7 North Dakota $^	7	–	0	–	0	9	–	1	–	0
No. 10 Northern Iowa ^	6	–	1	–	0	9	–	3	–	0
Augustana (SD)	5	–	2	–	0	7	–	3	–	0
South Dakota State	4	–	3	–	0	7	–	4	–	0
Mankato State	2	–	5	–	0	3	–	6	–	0
Morningside	2	–	5	–	0	3	–	6	–	0
South Dakota	1	–	6	–	0	3	–	8	–	0
North Dakota State	1	–	6	–	0	2	–	7	–	0
$ – Conference champion; ^ – NCAA Division II playoff participant; Rankings from AP Poll

The 1975 Northern Iowa Panthers football team was an American football team that represented the University of Northern Iowa as a member of the North Central Conference (NCC) during the 1975 NCAA Division II football season. In its 16th season under head coach Stan Sheriff, the team compiled a 9–3 record (6–1 in conference games) and finished in second place in the NCC. Northern Iowa advanced to the NCAA Division II Football Championship playoff, losing in the quarterfinals to the eventual national runner-up, Western Kentucky.

The team's statistical leaders included junior fullback Tom Scalisi (1,058 rushing yards), senior quarterback Bill Salmon (1,680 passing yards, 2,022 total offense yards), wide receiver Dave Schooley (780 receiving yards, 62 points scored). Five Northern Iowa players were named to the all-NCC team: Salmon; Schooley; defensive tackle Randy Erion; defensive end Nick Maragos; and offensive tackle Mike Timmermans.

The team played its home games at O. R. Latham Stadium in Cedar Falls, Iowa. It was the Panthers' final season at Latham, as they moved into the UNI-Dome for the 1976 season.

== Schedule ==
Date	Opponent	Rank	Site	Result	Attendance	Source
September 6	Eastern Illinois*		O. R. Latham Stadium; Cedar Falls, IA	W 14–8	7,354	
September 13	at UNLV*		Las Vegas Stadium; Whitney, NV	L 30–48	13,885	
September 20	at Mankato State		Blakeslee Stadium; Mankato, MN	W 35–6	2,390	
September 27	at North Dakota State		Dacotah Field; Fargo, ND	W 23–16	3,600	
October 4	No. 9 North Dakota		O. R. Latham Stadium; Cedar Falls, IA	L 20–21	7,550	
October 11	at Drake*		Drake Stadium; Des Moines, IA	W 27–24	10,365–10,368	
October 18	at Morningside		Sioux City, IA	W 21–14	3,500	
October 25	Augustana (SD)		O. R. Latham Stadium; Cedar Falls, IA	W 20–14	9,150	
November 1	at South Dakota State		Coughlin–Alumni Stadium; Brookings, SD	W 14–3	5,076	
November 8	South Dakota		O. R. Latham Stadium; Cedar Falls, IA	W 45–19	6,450	
November 15	Wisconsin–Whitewater*		O. R. Latham Stadium; Cedar Falls, IA	W 49–6	4,700	
November 29	No. 4 Western Kentucky*	No. 10	O. R. Latham Stadium; Cedar Falls, IA (NCAA Division II Quarterfinal)	L 12–14	2,500	
*Non-conference game; Rankings from AP Poll released prior to the game
