= 1975 Southwest Texas State Bobcats football team =

American college football season

1975 Southwest Texas State Bobcats football
- Conference: Lone Star Conference
- Record: 7–3 (4–3 LSC)
- Head coach: Bill Miller (11th season)
- Home stadium: Evans Field

1975 Lone Star Conference football standings
	Conf.					Overall
Team	W		L		T	W		L		T
No. 1 Texas A&I $^	9	–	0	–	0	12	–	0	–	0
No. 6 Angelo State	7	–	1	–	1	8	–	2	–	1
No. T–17 Southwest Texas State	7	–	2	–	0	7	–	3	–	0
No. T–19 East Texas State	6	–	3	–	0	8	–	3	–	0
No. 16 Abilene Christian	5	–	3	–	1	6	–	3	–	1
Howard Payne	4	–	5	–	0	5	–	5	–	1
Sam Houston State	3	–	6	–	0	3	–	7	–	0
Stephen F. Austin	1	–	8	–	0	2	–	8	–	0
Sul Ross	1	–	8	–	0	1	–	10	–	0
Tarleton State	1	–	8	–	0	1	–	10	–	0
$ – Conference champion; ^ – NAIA Division I playoff participant; Rankings from NAIA Division I poll

The 1975 Southwest Texas State Bobcats football team was an American football team that represented Southwest Texas State University (now known as Texas State University) during the 1975 NAIA Division I football season as a member of the Lone Star Conference (LSC). In their 11th year under head coach Bill Miller, the team compiled an overall record of 7–3, with a mark of 4–3 in conference play.

== Schedule ==
Date	Opponent	Site	Result	Source
September 13	at Texas Lutheran*	Matador Field; Seguin, TX	L 20–21	
September 27	at Angelo State	San Angelo Stadium; San Angelo, TX	L 15–44	
October 4	Abilene Christian	Evans Field; San Marcos, TX	W 21–16	
October 11	Tarleton State	Evans Field; San Marcos, TX	W 42–6	
October 18	at Stephen F. Austin	Lumberjack Stadium; Nacogdoches, TX	W 19–3	
October 25	Sam Houston State	Evans Field; San Marcos, TX (rivalry)	W 3–0	
November 1	East Texas State	Evans Field; San Marcos, TX	W 28–17	
November 8	at Howard Payne	Cen-Tex Stadium; Brownwood, TX	W 38–20	
November 15	Sul Ross	Evans Field; San Marcos, TX	W 15–14	
November 22	at Texas A&I	Javelina Stadium; Kingsville, TX	L 8–28	
*Non-conference game
