= 1975 Western Kentucky Hilltoppers football team =

American college football season

1975 Western Kentucky Hilltoppers football

OVC co-champion Grantland Rice Bowl Champion

Camellia Bowl, L 14–16 vs. Northern Michigan
- Conference: Ohio Valley Conference

Ranking
- AP: No. 3
- Record: 11–2 (6–1 OVC)
- Head coach: Jimmy Feix (8th season)
- Captains: Rick Green; Bob Hobby (alt.)
- Home stadium: L. T. Smith Stadium

1975 Ohio Valley Conference football standings
	Conf.					Overall
Team	W		L		T	W		L		T
No. 3 Western Kentucky ^	6	–	1	–	0	9	–	1	–	0
Tennessee Tech $	6	–	1	–	0	8	–	3	–	0
No. 12 Eastern Kentucky	5	–	2	–	0	8	–	2	–	1
Murray State	3	–	3	–	1	4	–	5	–	1
Austin Peay	3	–	4	–	0	3	–	8	–	0
Middle Tennessee	2	–	5	–	0	4	–	7	–	0
East Tennessee State	1	–	5	–	1	2	–	8	–	1
Morehead State	1	–	6	–	0	3	–	7	–	0
$ – Conference champion; ^ – NCAA Division II playoff participant; WKU claims a co-championship, while both the OVC and Tennessee Tech state it is not shared; Rankings from Associated Press poll

The 1975 Western Kentucky football team represented Western Kentucky University during the 1975 NCAA Division II football season. The team came off an 7–3 record from the prior season and was led by coach Jimmy Feix. They claimed a share of the Ohio Valley Conference championship and returned to the NCAA Division II Football Championship for the second time in three years. One of the highlights of the season was a victory over NCAA Division I Louisville. The Hilltoppers won their first two playoff games, including a win over New Hampshire in the Grantland Rice Bowl, before falling in the championship game to Northern Michigan in the Camellia Bowl. They finished ranked 3rd in both the AP and UPI final polls.

This team was one of the best in school history and included future National Football League (NFL) players David Carter, Darryl Drake, Rick Caswell, and Biff Madon. Rick Green was named to the AP All American team as well as the OVC Defensive Player of the Year and Feix was named Divisional Kodak College Coach-of-the-Year. The All OVC team included Green, Sheroid Barrett, Chip Carpenter, Walt Herod, John Leathers, and Keith Tandy.

== Schedule ==
Date	Opponent	Rank	Site	Result	Attendance	Source
September 6	at Dayton*		Welcome Stadium; Dayton, OH	W 27–7	11,300	
September 13	at Louisville*		Cardinal Stadium; Louisville, KY	W 21–17	34,700	
September 20	Illinois State*		L. T. Smith Stadium; Bowling Green, KY	W 24–14	15,300	
September 27	at Austin Peay	No. 2	Municipal Stadium; Clarksville, TN	W 30–3	6,800	
October 4	East Tennessee State	No. 2	L. T. Smith Stadium; Bowling Green, KY	W 17–0	14,400	
October 18	Tennessee Tech	No. 2	L. T. Smith Stadium; Bowling Green, KY	W 20–7	9,000	
October 25	at No. 4 Eastern Kentucky	No. 2	Hanger Field; Richmond, KY (Battle of the Bluegrass)	L 7–13	24,200	
November 1	Morehead State^{†}	No. 6	L. T. Smith Stadium; Bowling Green, KY	W 14–10	20,100	
November 8	at Middle Tennessee	No. 6	Johnny "Red" Floyd Stadium; Murfreesboro, TN (100 Miles of Hate)	W 24–10	11,300	
November 22	Murray State	No. 5	L. T. Smith Stadium; Bowling Green, KY (Battle for the Red Belt)	W 19–0	15,300	
November 29	at No. 10 Northern Iowa	No. 4	O. R. Latham Stadium; Cedar Falls, IA (NCAA Division II Quarterfinal)	W 14–12	2,500	
December 6	vs. New Hampshire	No. 4	BREC Memorial Stadium; Baton Rouge, LA (Grantland Rice Bowl—NCAA Division II Semifinal)	W 14–3	6,000	
December 13	vs. No. 5 Northern Michigan	No. 4	Charles C. Hughes Stadium; Sacramento, CA (Camellia Bowl—NCAA Division II Championship Game)	L 14–16	15,558	
*Non-conference game; ^{†}Homecoming; Rankings from AP Poll released prior to the game
