= 1975 Prairie View A&M Panthers football team =

American college football season

1975 Prairie View A&M Panthers football
- Conference: Southwestern Athletic Conference
- Record: 3–7 (1–5 SWAC)
- Head coach: Hoover J. Wright (6th season)
- Home stadium: Edward L. Blackshear Field; Houston Astrodome

1975 Southwestern Athletic Conference football standings
	Conf.					Overall
Team	W		L		T	W		L		T
No. 4 Grambling State *	4	–	2	–	0	10	–	2	–	0
No. 9 Southern +	4	–	2	–	0	9	–	3	–	0
No. 7 Jackson State +	4	–	2	–	0	7	–	3	–	0
No. T–19 Alcorn State	3	–	3	–	0	6	–	3	–	1
Mississippi Valley State	3	–	3	–	0	6	–	4	–	0
Texas Southern	2	–	4	–	0	4	–	6	–	0
Prairie View A&M	1	–	5	–	0	3	–	7	–	0
$ – Conference champion; * – Grambling State vacated a share of the conference championship.; Rankings from NCAA Division II AP poll for Grambling State and NAIA Division I poll for Southern and Jackson State

The 1975 Prairie View A&M Panthers football team represented Prairie View A&M University as a member of the Southwestern Athletic Conference (SWAC) during the 1975 NCAA Division II football season. Led by sixth-year head coach Hoover J. Wright, the Panthers compiled an overall record of 3–7, with a conference record of 1–5, and finished seventh in the SWAC.

== Schedule ==
Date	Opponent	Site	Result	Attendance	Source
September 13	vs. East Texas State*	Cotton Bowl; Dallas, TX	L 19–42	12,500	
September 20	Jackson State	Edward L. Blackshear Field; Prairie View, TX	L 13–49	10,000	
September 27	Southern	Houston Astrodome; Houston, TX	L 0–26		
October 4	vs. Grambling State	Cotton Bowl; Dallas, TX	W 0–0 (forfeit win)		
October 18	at Texas Lutheran*	Matador Stadium; Seguin, TX	L 3–28	6,000	
October 25	at Bishop*	P.C. Cobb Stadium; Dallas, TX	W 14–13	500	
November 1	Mississippi Valley State	Edward L. Blackshear Field; Prairie View, TX	L 26–27	13,000	
November 8	at Arkansas–Pine Bluff*	Pumphrey Stadium; Pine Bluff, AR	W 19–14	8,000	
November 15	at Alcorn State	Henderson Stadium; Lorman, MS	L 0–15	6,000	
November 26	vs. Texas Southern	Houston Astrodome; Houston, TX (rivalry)	L 14–18	9,000	
*Non-conference game
