= 1975 North Carolina A&T Aggies football team =

American college football season

1975 North Carolina A&T Aggies football

MEAC co-champion
- Conference: Mid-Eastern Athletic Conference
- Record: 8–3 (5–1 MEAC)
- Head coach: Hornsby Howell (8th season)
- Home stadium: World War Memorial Stadium

1975 Mid-Eastern Athletic Conference football standings
| | Conf. | | | | | Overall |
| Team | W | | L | | T | W | | L | | T |
|---|---|---|---|---|---|---|---|---|---|---|
| South Carolina State + | 5 | – | 1 | – | 0 | 8 | – | 2 | – | 1 |
| North Carolina A&T + | 5 | – | 1 | – | 0 | 8 | – | 3 | – | 0 |
| Howard | 4 | – | 2 | – | 0 | 8 | – | 3 | – | 0 |
| North Carolina Central | 3 | – | 2 | – | 1 | 5 | – | 4 | – | 1 |
| Delaware State | 2 | – | 4 | – | 0 | 5 | – | 5 | – | 0 |
| Morgan State | 1 | – | 4 | – | 1 | 4 | – | 5 | – | 1 |
| Maryland Eastern Shore | 0 | – | 6 | – | 0 | 0 | – | 10 | – | 0 |
+ – Conference co-champions

The 1975 North Carolina A&T Aggies football team represented North Carolina A&T State University as a member of the Mid-Eastern Athletic Conference (MEAC) during the 1975 NCAA Division II football season. Led by eighth-year head coach Hornsby Howell, the Aggies compiled an overall record of 8–3, with a mark of 5–1 in conference play, and finished as MEAC co-champion.

== Schedule ==
| Date | Opponent | Site | Result | Attendance | Source |
|---|---|---|---|---|---|
| September 6 | Virginia Union* | World War Memorial Stadium; Greensboro, NC | W 25–21 | 7,000 | |
| September 20 | at South Carolina State | State College Stadium; Orangeburg, SC (rivalry) | L 0–7 | 9,500–10,043 | |
| September 27 | Florida A&M* | World War Memorial Stadium; Greensboro, NC | L 0–7 | 10,000 | |
| October 4 | Johnson C. Smith* | World War Memorial Stadium; Greensboro, NC | W 21–0 | 8,500 | |
| October 11 | at Norfolk State* | Foreman Field; Norfolk, VA | W 35–13 | 10,500 | |
| October 18 | Maryland Eastern Shore | World War Memorial Stadium; Greensboro, NC | W 27–0 | 8,000–21,000 | |
| October 25 | Howard | World War Memorial Stadium; Greensboro, NC | W 34–14 | 6,000–6,318 | |
| November 1 | at Morgan State | Hughes Stadium; Baltimore, MD | W 48–28 | 7,800 | |
| November 8 | at Grambling State* | Grambling Stadium; Grambling, LA | L 16–42 | 10,000–12,707 | |
| November 15 | at Delaware State | Alumni Stadium; Dover, DE | W 27–7 | 4,000 | |
| November 22 | North Carolina Central | World War Memorial Stadium; Greensboro, NC (rivalry) | W 34–16 | 14,000 | |
*Non-conference game
