= 1975 Sam Houston State Bearkats football team =

American college football season

1975 Sam Houston State Bearkats football
- Conference: Lone Star Conference
- Record: 3–8 (3–6 LSC)
- Head coach: Billy Tidwell (2nd season)
- Home stadium: Pritchett Field

1975 Lone Star Conference football standings
	Conf.					Overall
Team	W		L		T	W		L		T
No. 1 Texas A&I $^	9	–	0	–	0	12	–	0	–	0
No. 6 Angelo State	7	–	1	–	1	8	–	2	–	1
No. T–17 Southwest Texas State	7	–	2	–	0	7	–	3	–	0
No. T–19 East Texas State	6	–	3	–	0	8	–	3	–	0
No. 16 Abilene Christian	5	–	3	–	1	6	–	3	–	1
Howard Payne	4	–	5	–	0	5	–	5	–	1
Sam Houston State	3	–	6	–	0	3	–	7	–	0
Stephen F. Austin	1	–	8	–	0	2	–	8	–	0
Sul Ross	1	–	8	–	0	1	–	10	–	0
Tarleton State	1	–	8	–	0	1	–	10	–	0
$ – Conference champion; ^ – NAIA Division I playoff participant; Rankings from NAIA Division I poll

The 1975 Sam Houston State Bearkats football team represented Sam Houston State University as a member of the Lone Star Conference (LSC) during the 1975 NAIA Division I football season. Led by second-year head coach Billy Tidwell, the Bearkats compiled an overall record of 3–8 with a mark of 3–6 in conference play, and finished seventh in the LSC.

== Schedule ==
Date	Opponent	Site	Result	Source
September 13	at Texas Southern*	Houston Astrodome; Houston, TX	L 22–49	
September 20	Southwestern Oklahoma State*	Pritchett Field; Huntsville, TX	L 0–24	
September 27	at East Texas State	Memorial Stadium; Commerce, TX	L 27–37	
October 4	at Sul Ross	Jackson Field; Alpine, TX	W 30–16	
October 11	Angelo State	Pritchett Field; Huntsville, TX	L 0–52	
October 18	at Tarleton State	Memorial Stadium; Stephenville, TX	W 40–16	
October 25	at Southwest Texas State	Evans Field; San Marcos, TX	L 0–3	
November 1	Howard Payne	Pritchett Field; Huntsville, TX	L 23–24	
November 8	Texas A&I	Pritchett Field; Huntsville, TX	L 7–43	
November 15	at Abilene Christian	Shotwell Stadium; Abilene, TX	L 20–55	
November 22	Stephen F. Austin	Pritchett Field; Huntsville, TX (rivalry)	W 8–7	
*Non-conference game
