= Sammy White (American football) =

American football player (born 1954)

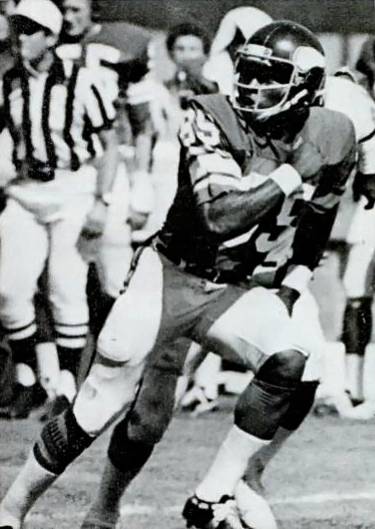
- White in 1976

No. 85
- Position: Wide receiver

Personal information
- Born: March 16, 1954 (age 72); Winnsboro, Louisiana, U.S.
- Listed height: 5 ft 11 in (1.80 m)
- Listed weight: 190 lb (86 kg)

Career information
- High school: Richwood (Ouachita Parish, Louisiana)
- College: Grambling State (1972–1975)
- NFL draft: 1976: 2nd round, 54th overall pick

Career history
- Minnesota Vikings (1976–1985)

Awards and highlights
- NFL Offensive Rookie of the Year (1976); 2× Pro Bowl (1976, 1977); PFWA All-Rookie Team (1976); 50 Greatest Vikings; Minnesota Vikings 25th Anniversary Team; First-team Little All-American (1975)

Career NFL statistics
- Receptions: 393
- Receiving yards: 6,400
- Receiving touchdowns: 50
- Stats at Pro Football Reference

Sammy White (born March 3, 1954) is an American former professional football player who was a wide receiver for 10 seasons with the Minnesota Vikings of the National Football League (NFL).

After playing college football at Grambling State University, White was selected in the second round of the 1976 NFL draft by Minnesota. He won the Associated Press Offensive Rookie of the Year and UPI NFL-NFC Rookie of the Year awards in 1976. He was a two-time Pro Bowl selection in 1976 and 1977. In 128 career games, he totaled 393 receptions, 6,400 receiving yards, and 50 touchdowns.

== College career ==
White played at Grambling from 1972 to 1975, playing on the same team as future NFL quarterback and Super Bowl XXII MVP Doug Williams during his final two seasons. He was a first-team All-Southwestern Athletic Conference selection in 1973 and 1975. As a senior, White caught 37 passes for 802 yards and 17 touchdowns.

== Professional career ==
White started each game of his rookie season of 1976, serving as both receiver and kick returner on occasion. In his first game against the New Orleans Saints on September 12, he caught three passes for 71 yards, with one of the catches going for a touchdown thrown by Fran Tarkenton. On November 7 against the Detroit Lions, he caught seven passes for 210 yards and two touchdowns. It would be the only time he had a 200-yard receiving game in his career and it currently stands as the team record for yards in a game. He closed out the season with a three-touchdown game against the Miami Dolphins. In total, he caught 51 passes for 906 yards for ten touchdowns. The Vikings, a perennial contender, were the hosts for a postseason run with White aboard for the ride. In the Divisional Round against Washington, he caught four passes for 64 yards, with two of them being for touchdowns as the Vikings rolled to a 35–20 victory. He was the starting receiver in the NFC Championship Game against Los Angeles, but he did not record a catch in the victory that saw them advance to Super Bowl XI. Playing the Oakland Raiders at the Rose Bowl, the Vikings did not lead at any point. During a 3rd down pass, White was trying to catch a pass from Tarkenton with DB Skip Thomas meeting him in the middle as safety Jack Tatum delivered a rough hit on White that knocked his helmet off. White left the game for a bit but returned to finish as the leading receiver for the Vikings, catching five passes for 77 yards with a touchdown to go with four kick returns for 79 yards in the 32–14 loss. White was named a Pro Bowler and awarded the Offensive Rookie of the Year Award, the second Viking to win the award.

The following season saw him catch 41 passes for 760 yards with nine touchdowns, which was good enough for a second (and last) Pro Bowl selection. In the playoffs, White didn't catch a pass in the Divisional Round versus Los Angeles that saw them play Dallas for the NFC Championship. White caught three passes for 46 yards with a kick return for 37 yards, but the Vikings lost 23–6. White, along with Randy Moss and Justin Jefferson, are the only wide receivers to make the Pro Bowl in their first two seasons with the Vikings. His third season (the first under the 16-game structure and also the last with Tarkenton as quarterback) saw him catch 53 passes for nine touchdowns on 741 yards. In the playoffs versus the Rams, he recorded no catches in the 34–10 loss. White played in 15 games for 1979 and caught 42 passes for 715 yards with four touchdowns as the Vikings (under newly installed starter Tommy Kramer) missed the playoffs for the first time in White's career. He caught 53 passes in 1980 for 887 yards with five touchdowns as the Vikings sneaked into the playoffs. Playing Philadelphia in the Divisional Round, White started the scoring off with a 30-yard reception for a touchdown. The Vikings had a halftime lead, but the Eagles eventually prevailed 31–16, with White catching only one further pass in the game. In the 1981 season, White had career highs in receptions and receiving yards, catching 66 passes for 1,001 yards that resulted in 3 touchdowns. In the strike-shortened 1982 season, he caught 29 passes for 503 yards and five touchdowns in six games. The Vikings reached the playoffs again and played in the Wild Card versus Atlanta. White caught a 36-yard pass (one of only two on the day) from Kramer to give the Vikings a 10–7 lead in the second quarter as the Vikings eventually won 30–24. White caught one pass in the ensuing Divisional Round loss against Washington, which was his last playoff appearance. In his next two seasons, he played less frequently, scoring five touchdowns combined. He closed out 1984 as just one of 44 players with 50 career receiving touchdowns. In his final season in 1985, he did not start a single game and caught eight total passes on the year.

== NFL career statistics ==
Legend
**Bold**	Career high

=== Regular season ===
Year	Team	Games		Receiving				
Year	Team	GP	GS	Rec	Yds	Avg	Lng	TD
1976	MIN	14	14	51	906	17.8	56	**10**
1977	MIN	14	14	41	760	18.5	**69**	9
1978	MIN	16	16	53	741	14.0	33	9
1979	MIN	15	15	42	715	17.0	55	4
1980	MIN	16	16	53	887	16.7	50	5
1981	MIN	16	16	**66**	**1,001**	15.2	53	3
1982	MIN	7	6	29	503	17.3	65	5
1983	MIN	11	10	29	412	14.2	43	4
1984	MIN	13	11	21	399	**19.0**	47	1
1985	MIN	6	0	8	76	9.5	15	0
		128	118	393	6,400	16.3	69	50

=== Postseason ===
Year	Team	Games		Receiving				
Year	Team	GP	GS	Rec	Yds	Avg	Lng	TD
1976	MIN	3	3	**9**	**141**	15.7	27	**3**
1977	MIN	2	2	3	46	15.3	28	0
1978	MIN	1	1	0	0	0.0	0	0
1980	MIN	1	1	2	52	**26.0**	30	1
1982	MIN	2	2	3	74	24.7	**36**	1
		9	9	17	313	18.4	36	5

== After retirement ==
After receiving an invitation to join the coaching staff at Grambling State from his old teammate Doug Williams, who became GSU's head coach in 1998, White worked as a receivers coach (1998-2003 and 2007–2009) and offensive coordinator (2004–2006). During that time Grambling won six Western Division titles and five SWAC championships. White was inducted into the SWAC Hall of Fame in 2004.

In 2022, he was inducted into the Black College Football Hall of Fame.
