= 1975 Wisconsin–La Crosse Indians football team =

American college football season

1975 Wisconsin–La Crosse Indians football
- Conference: Wisconsin State University Conference
- Record: 8–3 (7–1 WSUC)
- Head coach: Roger Harring (7th season)
- Home stadium: Veterans Memorial Stadium

1975 Wisconsin State University Conference football standings
	Conf.					Overall
Team	W		L		T	W		L		T
No. 14 Wisconsin–River Falls +	7	–	1	–	0	8	–	2	–	0
Wisconsin–La Crosse +	7	–	1	–	0	8	–	3	–	0
Wisconsin–Whitewater +	7	–	1	–	0	8	–	3	–	0
Wisconsin–Stevens Point	4	–	4	–	0	4	–	6	–	0
Wisconsin–Eau Claire	3	–	5	–	0	4	–	6	–	0
Wisconsin–Oshkosh	3	–	5	–	0	3	–	7	–	0
Wisconsin–Stout	3	–	5	–	0	3	–	7	–	0
Wisconsin–Platteville	2	–	6	–	0	3	–	7	–	0
Wisconsin–Superior	0	–	8	–	0	1	–	9	–	0
+ – Conference co-champions; Rankings from NAIA Division I poll

The 1975 Wisconsin–La Crosse Indians football team was an American football team that represented the University of Wisconsin–La Crosse as a member of the Wisconsin State University Conference (WSUC) during the 1975 NAIA Division I football season.

== Schedule ==
Date	Opponent	Site	Result	Source
September 6	Upper Iowa*	Veterans Memorial Stadium; La Crosse, WI	W 24–10	
September 13	Wisconsin–Oshkosh	Veterans Memorial Stadium; La Crosse, WI	W 12–9	
September 20	at Wisconsin–Platteville	Platteville, WI	W 27–7	
September 27	Wisconsin–Stevens Point	Veterans Memorial Stadium; La Crosse, WI	W 21–20	
October 4	Lincoln (MO)*	Veterans Memorial Stadium; La Crosse, WI	L 0–3	
October 11	at Wisconsin–Stout	Menomonie, WI	W 28–6	
October 18	Wisconsin–River Falls	Veterans Memorial Stadium; La Crosse, WI	W 20–12	
October 25	at Wisconsin–Superior	Superior, WI	W 40–0	
November 1	Wisconsin–Whitewater	Veterans Memorial Stadium; La Crosse, WI	L 3–12	
November 8	at Wisconsin–Eau Claire	Eau Claire, WI	W 21–13	
November 15	at Mississippi Valley State*	Magnolia Stadium; Itta Bena, MS	L 17–21	
*Non-conference game

== Roster ==
1975 Wisconsin–La Crosse Indians football team roster
Players			Coaches
Offense: Pos. / # / Name / Class; G / 65 / Daune Gary / Fr	Defense: Pos. / # / Name / Class; LB / 61 / Joel Williams / Fr	Special teams: Pos. / # / Name / Class	Head coach: Roger Harring; Coordinators/assistant coaches Legend: (C) Team captain; (S) Suspended; (I) Ineligible; Injured; Redshirt
