= 1975 Maryland Eastern Shore Hawks football team =

American college football season

1975 Maryland Eastern Shore Hawks football
- Conference: Mid-Eastern Athletic Conference
- Record: 0–10 (0–6 MEAC)
- Head coach: Harold Gray (3rd season)

1975 Mid-Eastern Athletic Conference football standings
	Conf.					Overall
Team	W		L		T	W		L		T
South Carolina State +	5	–	1	–	0	8	–	2	–	1
North Carolina A&T +	5	–	1	–	0	8	–	3	–	0
Howard	4	–	2	–	0	8	–	3	–	0
North Carolina Central	3	–	2	–	1	5	–	4	–	1
Delaware State	2	–	4	–	0	5	–	5	–	0
Morgan State	1	–	4	–	1	4	–	5	–	1
Maryland Eastern Shore	0	–	6	–	0	0	–	10	–	0
+ – Conference co-champions

The 1975 Maryland Eastern Shore Hawks football team represented the University of Maryland Eastern Shore as a member of the Mid-Eastern Athletic Conference (MEAC) during the 1975 NCAA Division II football season. Led by third-year head coach Harold Gray, the Hawks compiled an overall record of 0–10, with a mark of 0–6 in conference play, and finished last in the MEAC.

== Schedule ==
Date	Opponent	Site	Result	Attendance	Source
September 13	at Johnson C. Smith*	American Legion Memorial Stadium; Charlotte, NC	L 14–26		
September 19	at Howard	RFK Stadium; Washington, DC	L 0–45	5,000	
September 27	Kentucky State*	Princess Anne, MD	L 0–28	3,500	
October 4	Delaware State	Princess Anne, MD	L 0–44		
October 11	at Morgan State	Hughes Stadium; Baltimore, MD	L 0–26	10,500	
October 18	at North Carolina A&T	World War Memorial Stadium; Greensboro, NC	L 0–27	8,000–21,000	
October 25	North Carolina Central	Princess Anne, MD	L 0–14		
November 8	vs. South Carolina State	Baynard Stadium; Wilmington, DE	L 0–28	2,500	
November 15	vs. Bowie State*	Wicomico County Stadium; Salisbury, MD	L 13–21		
November 29	vs. Bethune–Cookman*	Tangerine Bowl; Orlando, FL (Central Florida Classic)	L 0–67	12,200	
*Non-conference game
