= 1975 Morgan State Bears football team =

American college football season

1975 Morgan State Bears football
- Conference: Mid-Eastern Athletic Conference
- Record: 4–5–1 (3–2–1 MEAC)
- Head coach: Nat Taylor (2nd season)
- Defensive coordinator: Thomas Morris (3rd season)
- Home stadium: Hughes Stadium

1975 Mid-Eastern Athletic Conference football standings
	Conf.					Overall
Team	W		L		T	W		L		T
South Carolina State +	5	–	1	–	0	8	–	2	–	1
North Carolina A&T +	5	–	1	–	0	8	–	3	–	0
Howard	4	–	2	–	0	8	–	3	–	0
North Carolina Central	3	–	2	–	1	5	–	4	–	1
Delaware State	2	–	4	–	0	5	–	5	–	0
Morgan State	1	–	4	–	1	4	–	5	–	1
Maryland Eastern Shore	0	–	6	–	0	0	–	10	–	0
+ – Conference co-champions

The 1975 Morgan State Bears football team represented Morgan State College (now known as Morgan State University) as a member of the Mid-Eastern Athletic Conference (MEAC) during the 1975 NCAA Division II football season. Led by second-year head coach Nat Taylor, the Bears compiled an overall record of 4–5–1, with a mark of 3–2–1 in conference play, and finished sixth in the MEAC.

== Schedule ==
Date	Opponent	Site	Result	Attendance	Source
September 6	Virginia State*	Hughes Stadium; Baltimore, MD	W 17–6		
September 13	vs. Grambling State*	RFK Stadium; Washington, DC	L 7–40	29,112	
October 4	at North Carolina Central	O'Kelly Stadium; Durham, NC	T 20–20		
October 11	Maryland Eastern Shore^{†}	Hughes Stadium; Baltimore, MD	W 26–0	10,500	
October 18	at South Carolina State	State College Stadium; Orangeburg, SC	L 0–35	14,122	
October 25	at Delaware State	Alumni Stadium; Dover, DE	L 3–17		
November 1	North Carolina A&T	Hughes Stadium; Baltimore, MD	L 28–48	7,800	
November 9	vs. Virginia Union*	Memorial Stadium; Mount Vernon, NY (Westchester Classic)	W 24–21	10,000	
November 15	Central State (OH)*	Hughes Stadium; Baltimore, MD	W 24–21		
November 21	at Howard	RFK Stadium; Washington, DC (rivalry)	L 16–22	5,000–7,000	
*Non-conference game; ^{†}Homecoming
