= 1975 Howard Bison football team =

American college football season

1975 Howard Bison football
- Conference: Mid-Eastern Athletic Conference
- Record: 8–3 (4–2 MEAC)
- Head coach: Doug Porter (2nd season)
- Home stadium: RFK Stadium

1975 Mid-Eastern Athletic Conference football standings
	Conf.					Overall
Team	W		L		T	W		L		T
South Carolina State +	5	–	1	–	0	8	–	2	–	1
North Carolina A&T +	5	–	1	–	0	8	–	3	–	0
Howard	4	–	2	–	0	8	–	3	–	0
North Carolina Central	3	–	2	–	1	5	–	4	–	1
Delaware State	2	–	4	–	0	5	–	5	–	0
Morgan State	1	–	4	–	1	4	–	5	–	1
Maryland Eastern Shore	0	–	6	–	0	0	–	10	–	0
+ – Conference co-champions

The 1975 Howard Bison football team represented Howard University as a member of the Mid-Eastern Athletic Conference (MEAC) during the 1975 NCAA Division II football season. Led by second-year head coach Doug Porter, the Bison compiled an overall record of 8–3, with a mark of 4–2 in conference play, and finished third in the MEAC.

== Schedule ==
Date	Opponent	Site	Result	Attendance	Source
September 13	at Wayne State (MI)*	Wayne State Stadium; Detroit, MI	W 7–6	2,000–3,369	
September 19	Maryland Eastern Shore	RFK Stadium; Washington, DC	W 45–0	5,000	
September 27	at South Carolina State	State College Stadium; Orangeburg, SC	L 0–27	2,000–6,147	
October 4	vs. Florida A&M*	Veterans Stadium; Philadelphia, PA (OIC Classic)	W 6–0	18,700–35,000	
October 11	at Delaware State	Alumni Stadium; Dover, DE	W 12–7	1,200	
October 18	Virginia State*	RFK Stadium; Washington, DC	W 35–12	10,000	
October 25	at North Carolina A&T	World War Memorial Stadium; Greensboro, NC	L 14–34	6,000–6,318	
October 31	Hampton*	RFK Stadium; Washington, DC (rivalry)	W 19–15	4,000	
November 8	Southern*	RFK Stadium; Washington, DC	L 0–20	15,000	
November 15	at North Carolina Central	O'Kelly Stadium; Durham, NC	W 41–10	5,000	
November 21	Morgan State	RFK Stadium; Washington, DC (rivalry)	W 22–16	5,000–7,000	
*Non-conference game
