= 1975 Delaware State Hornets football team =

American college football season

1975 Delaware State Hornets football
- Conference: Mid-Eastern Athletic Conference
- Record: 5–5 (2–4 MEAC)
- Head coach: Ed Wyche (1st season)
- Home stadium: Alumni Stadium

1975 Mid-Eastern Athletic Conference football standings
	Conf.					Overall
Team	W		L		T	W		L		T
South Carolina State +	5	–	1	–	0	8	–	2	–	1
North Carolina A&T +	5	–	1	–	0	8	–	3	–	0
Howard	4	–	2	–	0	8	–	3	–	0
North Carolina Central	3	–	2	–	1	5	–	4	–	1
Delaware State	2	–	4	–	0	5	–	5	–	0
Morgan State	1	–	4	–	1	4	–	5	–	1
Maryland Eastern Shore	0	–	6	–	0	0	–	10	–	0
+ – Conference co-champions

The 1975 Delaware State Hornets football team represented Delaware State College—now known as Delaware State University—as a member of the Mid-Eastern Athletic Conference (MEAC) in the 1975 NCAA Division II football season. Led by first-year head coach Ed Wyche, the Hornets compiled an overall record of 5–5 and a mark of 2–4 in conference play, placing fifth out of seven teams in the MEAC.

== Schedule ==
Date	Opponent	Site	Result	Attendance	Source
September 6	at Elizabeth City State*	Elizabeth City, NC	W 17–7		
September 13	at William Paterson*	Wayne, NJ	W 29–0		
September 20	at Alcorn State*	Henderson Stadium; Lorman, MS	L 7–33		
September 27	at Federal City College*	Washington, DC	Cancelled		
October 4	at Maryland Eastern Shore	Princess Anne, MD	W 44–0		
October 11	Howard	Alumni Stadium; Dover, DE	L 7–12	1,200	
October 18	at North Carolina Central	O'Kelly–Riddick Stadium; Durham, NC	L 14–16		
October 25	Morgan State	Alumni Stadium; Dover, DE	W 17–3		
November 8	at Shaw*	Raleigh, NC	W 14–6 (Note: Game was called with 3 minutes left following a fight between the two teams.)		
November 15	North Carolina A&T	Alumni Stadium; Dover, DE	L 7–27	4,000	
November 22	at South Carolina State	Oliver C. Dawson Stadium; Orangeburg, SC	L 0–39		
*Non-conference game
