= 1975 Texas Southern Tigers football team =

American college football season

1975 Texas Southern Tigers football
- Conference: Southwestern Athletic Conference
- Record: 4–6 (2–4 SWAC)
- Head coach: Rod Paige (5th season)
- Defensive coordinator: Henry Lattimore
- Home stadium: Astrodome; Rice Stadium

1975 Southwestern Athletic Conference football standings
	Conf.					Overall
Team	W		L		T	W		L		T
No. 4 Grambling State *	4	–	2	–	0	10	–	2	–	0
No. 9 Southern +	4	–	2	–	0	9	–	3	–	0
No. 7 Jackson State +	4	–	2	–	0	7	–	3	–	0
No. T–19 Alcorn State	3	–	3	–	0	6	–	3	–	1
Mississippi Valley State	3	–	3	–	0	6	–	4	–	0
Texas Southern	2	–	4	–	0	4	–	6	–	0
Prairie View A&M	1	–	5	–	0	3	–	7	–	0
$ – Conference champion; * – Grambling State vacated a share of the conference championship.; Rankings from NCAA Division II AP poll for Grambling State and NAIA Division I poll for Southern and Jackson State

The 1975 Texas Southern Tigers football team was an American football team that represented Texas Southern University as a member of the Southwestern Athletic Conference (SWAC) during the 1975 NCAA Division II football season. Led by fifth-year head coach Rod Paige, the Tigers compiled an overall record of 4–6, with a mark of 2–4 in conference play, and finished sixth in the SWAC.

== Schedule ==
Date	Opponent	Site	Result	Attendance	Source
September 13	Sam Houston State*	Astrodome; Houston, TX	W 49–22		
September 20	at Southern	University Stadium; Baton Rouge, LA	L 13–35		
September 27	Bethune–Cookman*	Rice Stadium; Houston, TX	L 27–30		
October 11	Alcorn State	Astrodome; Houston, TX	L 0–15		
October 18	at Bishop*	P.C. Cobb Stadium; Dallas, TX	L 10–21		
October 25	at Mississippi Valley State	Magnolia Stadium; Itta Bena, MS	W 7–0		
November 1	No. 5 Grambling State	Astrodome; Houston, TX	L 21–37		
November 8	No. 12 Jackson State	Astrodome; Houston, TX	L 9–13	5,000	
November 15	Langston*	Astrodome; Houston, TX	W 41–0		
November 26	Prairie View A&M	Astrodome; Houston, TX (rivalry)	W 18–14		
*Non-conference game; Rankings from AP Poll released prior to the game
