= 1975 Texas A&I Javelinas football team =

American college football season

1975 Texas A&I Javelinas football

NAIA Division I national champion LSC champion

Champion Bowl, W 37–0 vs. Salem
- Conference: Lone Star Conference
- Record: 12–0 (9–0 LSC)
- Head coach: Gil Steinke (22nd season)
- Defensive coordinator: Fred Jonas (7th season)
- Captains: Ray Evans; David Hill
- Home stadium: Javelina Stadium

1975 Lone Star Conference football standings
	Conf.					Overall
Team	W		L		T	W		L		T
No. 1 Texas A&I $^	9	–	0	–	0	12	–	0	–	0
No. 6 Angelo State	7	–	1	–	1	8	–	2	–	1
No. T–17 Southwest Texas State	7	–	2	–	0	7	–	3	–	0
No. T–19 East Texas State	6	–	3	–	0	8	–	3	–	0
No. 16 Abilene Christian	5	–	3	–	1	6	–	3	–	1
Howard Payne	4	–	5	–	0	5	–	5	–	1
Sam Houston State	3	–	6	–	0	3	–	7	–	0
Stephen F. Austin	1	–	8	–	0	2	–	8	–	0
Sul Ross	1	–	8	–	0	1	–	10	–	0
Tarleton State	1	–	8	–	0	1	–	10	–	0
$ – Conference champion; ^ – NAIA Division I playoff participant; Rankings from NAIA Division I poll

The 1975 Texas A&I Javelinas football team was an American football team that represented the Texas College of Arts and Industries (now known as Texas A&M University–Kingsville) as a member of the Lone Star Conference during the 1975 NAIA Division I football season. In its 22nd year under head coach Gil Steinke, the team compiled a perfect 12–0 record (9–0 against conference opponents), won the Lone Star Conference championship, and defeated Salem in the Champion Bowl to win the NAIA national championship.

The team played its home games at Javelina Stadium in Kingsville, Texas.

== Schedule ==
Date	Opponent	Site	Result	Attendance	Source
September 13	at Hawaii*	Aloha Stadium; Halawa, HI	W 43–9	32,247	
September 27	at Abilene Christian	Shotwell Stadium; Abilene, TX	W 24–21		
October 4	Stephen F. Austin	Javelina Stadium; Kingsville, TX	W 49–0		
October 11	East Texas State	Javelina Stadium; Kingsville, TX	W 36–7		
October 18	at Sul Ross	Alpine, TX	W 50–26		
October 25	Angelo State	Javelina Stadium; Kingsville, TX	W 14–6		
November 1	at Tarleton State	Stephenville, TX	W 28–0		
November 8	at Sam Houston State	Pritchett Field; Huntsville, TX	W 43–7		
November 15	Howard Payne	Javelina Stadium; Kingsville, TX	W 48–10		
November 22	Southwest Texas State	Javelina Stadium; Kingsville, TX	W 28–8		
December 6	Oregon College*	Javelina Stadium; Kingsville, TX (NAIA Division I semifinal)	W 37–0	10,357	
December 13	Salem*	Javelina Stadium; Kingsville, TX (Champion Bowl)	W 37–0	10,315	
*Non-conference game
