= 1975 Wisconsin–Whitewater Warhawks football team =

American college football season

1975 Wisconsin–Whitewater Warhawks football

WSUC co-champion
- Conference: Wisconsin State University Conference
- Record: 8–3 (7–1 WSUC)
- Head coach: Forrest Perkins (19th season)
- Home stadium: Warhawks Stadium

1975 Wisconsin State University Conference football standings
	Conf.					Overall
Team	W		L		T	W		L		T
No. 14 Wisconsin–River Falls +	7	–	1	–	0	8	–	2	–	0
Wisconsin–La Crosse +	7	–	1	–	0	8	–	3	–	0
Wisconsin–Whitewater +	7	–	1	–	0	8	–	3	–	0
Wisconsin–Stevens Point	4	–	4	–	0	4	–	6	–	0
Wisconsin–Eau Claire	3	–	5	–	0	4	–	6	–	0
Wisconsin–Oshkosh	3	–	5	–	0	3	–	7	–	0
Wisconsin–Stout	3	–	5	–	0	3	–	7	–	0
Wisconsin–Platteville	2	–	6	–	0	3	–	7	–	0
Wisconsin–Superior	0	–	8	–	0	1	–	9	–	0
+ – Conference co-champions; Rankings from NAIA Division I poll

The 1975 Wisconsin–Whitewater Warhawks football team was an American football team that represented the University of Wisconsin–Whitewater as a member of the Wisconsin State University Conference (WSUC) during the 1975 NCAA Division III football season. Led by 19th-year head coach Forrest Perkins, the Warhawks compiled an overall record of 8–3 and a mark of 7–1 in conference play, sharing the WSUC title with Wisconsin–La Crosse and Wisconsin–River Falls.

== Schedule ==
Date	Opponent	Site	Result	Attendance	Source
September 6	at Northern Michigan*	Memorial Field; Marquette, MI	L 0–34	4,912	
September 13	at Wisconsin–Stevens Point	Goerke Field; Stevens Point, WI	W 15–13		
September 20	Wisconsin–Stout	Warhawks Stadium; Whitewater, WI	W 28–8		
September 27	Wisconsin–Platteville	Warhawks Stadium; Whitewater, WI	W 24–21		
October 4	at Wisconsin–Superior	Superior, WI	W 17–0		
October 11	Lakeland*	Warhawks Stadium; Whitewater, WI	W 21–0		
October 18	Wisconsin–Eau Claire	Warhawks Stadium; Whitewater, WI	W 17–0		
October 25	at Wisconsin–River Falls	River Falls, WI	L 6–26		
November 1	at Wisconsin–La Crosse	Veterans Memorial Stadium; La Crosse, WI	W 12–3		
November 8	Wisconsin–Oshkosh	Warhawks Stadium; Whitewater, WI	W 7–3		
November 15	at Northern Iowa*	O. R. Latham Stadium; Cedar Falls, IA	L 6–49	4,700	
*Non-conference game
