= 1975 Mississippi Valley State Delta Devils football team =

American college football season

1975 Mississippi Valley State Delta Devils football
- Conference: Southwestern Athletic Conference
- Record: 6–4 (3–3 SWAC)
- Head coach: Davis Weathersby (6th season)
- Home stadium: Magnolia Stadium

1975 Southwestern Athletic Conference football standings
	Conf.					Overall
Team	W		L		T	W		L		T
No. 4 Grambling State *	4	–	2	–	0	10	–	2	–	0
No. 9 Southern +	4	–	2	–	0	9	–	3	–	0
No. 7 Jackson State +	4	–	2	–	0	7	–	3	–	0
No. T–19 Alcorn State	3	–	3	–	0	6	–	3	–	1
Mississippi Valley State	3	–	3	–	0	6	–	4	–	0
Texas Southern	2	–	4	–	0	4	–	6	–	0
Prairie View A&M	1	–	5	–	0	3	–	7	–	0
$ – Conference champion; * – Grambling State vacated a share of the conference championship.; Rankings from NCAA Division II AP poll for Grambling State and NAIA Division I poll for Southern and Jackson State

The 1975 Mississippi Valley State Delta Devils football team represented Mississippi Valley State University as a member of the Southwestern Athletic Conference (SWAC) during the 1975 NCAA Division II football season. Led by sixth-year head coach Davis Weathersby, the Delta Devils compiled an overall record of 6–4, with a conference record of 3–3, and finished tied for fourth in the SWAC.

== Schedule ==
Date	Opponent	Site	Result	Attendance	Source
September 13	at Bethune–Cookman*	Daytona International Speedway; Daytona Beach, FL	L 6–21	6,000	
September 20	Arkansas–Pine Bluff*	Magnolia Stadium; Itta Bena, MS	W 50–14		
September 27	No. 5 Jackson State	Magnolia Stadium; Itta Bena, MS	L 13–14	11,300	
October 4	Southern	Magnolia Stadium; Itta Bena, MS	W 14–7		
October 18	at No. 1 Grambling State	Grambling Stadium; Grambling, LA	L 22–38	20,118	
October 25	Texas Southern	Magnolia Stadium; Itta Bena, MS	L 0–7		
November 1	at Prairie View A&M	Edward L. Blackshear Field; Prairie View, TX	W 27–26		
November 8	at Alcorn State	Henderson Stadium; Lorman, MS	W 15–6		
November 15	Wisconsin–La Crosse*	Magnolia Stadium; Itta Bena, MS	W 20–17		
November 22	Bishop*	Magnolia Stadium; Itta Bena, MS	W 20–14		
*Non-conference game; Rankings from AP Poll released prior to the game
