= 1975 South Carolina State Bulldogs football team =

American college football season

1975 South Carolina State Bulldogs football

MEAC co-champion

Pelican Bowl, L 12–15 vs. Southern
- Conference: Mid-Eastern Athletic Conference
- Record: 8–2–1 (5–1 MEAC)
- Head coach: Willie Jeffries (3rd season)
- Home stadium: State College Stadium

1975 Mid-Eastern Athletic Conference football standings
	Conf.					Overall
Team	W		L		T	W		L		T
South Carolina State +	5	–	1	–	0	8	–	2	–	1
North Carolina A&T +	5	–	1	–	0	8	–	3	–	0
Howard	4	–	2	–	0	8	–	3	–	0
North Carolina Central	3	–	2	–	1	5	–	4	–	1
Delaware State	2	–	4	–	0	5	–	5	–	0
Morgan State	1	–	4	–	1	4	–	5	–	1
Maryland Eastern Shore	0	–	6	–	0	0	–	10	–	0
+ – Conference co-champions

The 1975 South Carolina State Bulldogs football team represented South Carolina State College (now known as South Carolina State University) as a member of the Mid-Eastern Athletic Conference (MEAC) during the 1975 NCAA Division II football season. Led by third-year head coach Willie Jeffries, the Bulldogs compiled an overall record of 8–2–1, with a mark of 5–1 in conference play, and finished as MEAC co-champion.

== Schedule ==
Date	Opponent	Site	Result	Attendance	Source
September 20	North Carolina A&T	State College Stadium; Orangeburg, SC (rivalry)	W 7–0	9,500–10,043	
September 27	Howard	State College Stadium; Orangeburg, SC	W 27–0	2,000–6,147	
October 4	at Alcorn State*	Henderson Stadium; Lorman, MS	T 7–7	12,000	
October 11	at Johnson C. Smith*	American Legion Memorial Stadium; Charlotte, NC	W 10–7	9,000	
October 18	Morgan State^{†}	State College Stadium; Orangeburg, SC	W 35–0	14,122	
October 25	vs. Newberry*	Irmo High School Stadium; Irmo, SC	W 10–0	8,000	
November 1	at North Carolina Central	O'Kelly Stadium; Durham, NC (rivalry)	L 3–6	12,500	
November 8	vs. Maryland Eastern Shore	Baynard Stadium; Wilmington, DE	W 28–0	2,500	
November 22	Delaware State	State College Stadium; Orangeburg, SC	W 39–0	5,623	
November 29	Wofford*	State College Stadium; Orangeburg, SC	W 23–9	7,103	
December 27	vs. Southern*	Louisiana Superdome; New Orleans, LA (Pelican Bowl)	L 12–15	6,748	
*Non-conference game; ^{†}Homecoming
