= 1975 NAIA Division II football season =

American college football season

- Regular season: August–November 1975
- Postseason: November–December 1975
- National Championship: Thousand Oaks, CA
- Champions: Texas Lutheran (2)

The 1975 NAIA Division II football season was the 20th season of college football sponsored by the NAIA and the sixth season of play of the NAIA's lower division for football.

The season was played from August to November 1975 and culminated in the 1975 NAIA Division II Football National Championship, played on the campus of California Lutheran University in Thousand Oaks, California.

Texas Lutheran defeated Cal Lutheran in the championship game, 34–8, to win their second consecutive NAIA national title.

== Conference standings ==
1975 College Conference of Illinois and Wisconsin football standings
	Conf.					Overall
Team	W		L		T	W		L		T
Augustana (IL) $	6	–	2	–	0	7	–	2	–	0
North Central (IL)	5	–	2	–	1	5	–	3	–	1
Carroll (WI)	5	–	3	–	0	6	–	3	–	0
Millikin	5	–	3	–	0	6	–	3	–	0
Wheaton (IL)	5	–	3	–	0	5	–	4	–	0
Illinois Wesleyan	4	–	3	–	1	4	–	4	–	1
Carthage	3	–	5	–	0	4	–	5	–	0
Elmhurst	1	–	7	–	0	2	–	7	–	0
North Park	1	–	7	–	0	1	–	8	–	0
$ – Conference champion

1975 Frontier Conference football standings
	Conf.					Overall
Team	W		L		T	W		L		T
Eastern Montana $	3	–	1	–	0	5	–	3	–	0
Carroll (MT)	2	–	2	–	0	3	–	5	–	0
Rocky Mountain	2	–	2	–	0	3	–	6	–	0
Montana Tech	2	–	2	–	0	2	–	5	–	0
Western Montana	1	–	3	–	0	1	–	7	–	0
$ – Conference champion

1975 Great Lakes Intercollegiate Athletic Conference football standings
	Conf.					Overall
Team	W		L		T	W		L		T
Wayne State (MI) $	3	–	1	–	0	8	–	3	–	0
No. 15 Grand Valley State	3	–	1	–	1	7	–	2	–	1
Northwood	3	–	1	–	1	5	–	4	–	1
Hillsdale	3	–	2	–	0	7	–	4	–	0
Saginaw Valley State	1	–	3	–	0	3	–	7	–	0
Ferris State	0	–	5	–	0	0	–	10	–	0
$ – Conference champion; Rankings from NAIA Division II poll

1975 Heart of America Athletic Conference football standings
	Conf.					Overall
Team	W		L		T	W		L		T
No. 14 Missouri Valley +	5	–	1	–	0	8	–	2	–	0
Graceland +	5	–	1	–	0	7	–	3	–	1
Central Methodist +	5	–	1	–	0	5	–	5	–	0
Tarkio	2	–	3	–	1	2	–	7	–	1
William Jewell	1	–	3	–	2	1	–	7	–	2
Baker	1	–	4	–	1	2	–	5	–	1
Ottawa	0	–	6	–	0	2	–	7	–	0
+ – Conference co-champions; Rankings from NAIA Division II poll

1975 Hoosier–Buckeye Conference football standings
	Conf.					Overall
Team	W		L		T	W		L		T
No. 4 Hanover $^	8	–	0	–	0	9	–	1	–	0
No. 12 Wilmington (OH)	5	–	2	–	1	6	–	2	–	1
Bluffton	5	–	2	–	1	5	–	3	–	1
Taylor	5	–	3	–	0	6	–	3	–	0
Defiance	3	–	5	–	0	4	–	5	–	0
Earlham	2	–	6	–	0	2	–	7	–	0
Anderson (IN)	2	–	6	–	0	2	–	7	–	0
Manchester (IN)	2	–	6	–	0	2	–	7	–	0
Findlay	2	–	6	–	0	2	–	8	–	0
$ – Conference champion; ^ – NAIA Division II playoff participant.; Rankings from NAIA Division II poll

1975 Iowa Conference football standings
	Conf.					Overall
Team	W		L		T	W		L		T
No. 3 William Penn $^	7	–	0	–	0	10	–	1	–	0
No. 9 Buena Vista	6	–	1	–	0	8	–	2	–	0
Central (IA)	4	–	3	–	0	5	–	4	–	0
Luther	4	–	3	–	0	4	–	5	–	0
Dubuque	3	–	4	–	0	4	–	5	–	1
Wartburg	2	–	5	–	0	4	–	5	–	0
Simpson (IA)	1	–	6	–	0	2	–	7	–	0
Upper Iowa	1	–	6	–	0	1	–	9	–	0
$ – Conference champion; ^ – NAIA Division II playoff participant; Rankings from NAIA Division II poll

1975 Kansas Collegiate Athletic Conference football standings
	Conf.					Overall
Team	W		L		T	W		L		T
No. 13 St. Mary of the Plains $	7	–	1	–	0	8	–	2	–	0
Southwestern (KS)	5	–	3	–	0	6	–	3	–	0
Friends	5	–	3	–	0	5	–	4	–	0
Kansas Wesleyan	5	–	3	–	0	5	–	5	–	0
Sterling	4	–	3	–	1	4	–	4	–	1
Bethany (KS)	3	–	5	–	0	3	–	7	–	0
McPherson	2	–	5	–	1	2	–	7	–	1
Bethel (KS) *	2	–	6	–	0	2	–	7	–	0
Tabor	2	–	6	–	0	2	–	7	–	0
$ – Conference champion; * – Bethel forfeited games to Bethany, Kansas Wesleyan, Southwestern, Friends, Tabor, and Sterling due to an ineligible player; Rankings from NAIA Division II poll

1975 Minnesota Intercollegiate Athletic Conference football standings
	Conf.					Overall
Team	W		L		T	W		L		T
No. 13 Saint John's (MN) $	6	–	0	–	1	8	–	1	–	1
Minnesota–Duluth	6	–	1	–	0	8	–	2	–	0
Hamline	4	–	3	–	0	5	–	5	–	0
Gustavus Adolphus	4	–	3	–	0	4	–	5	–	0
St. Olaf	3	–	3	–	1	5	–	3	–	1
Concordia–Moorhead	3	–	4	–	0	5	–	4	–	0
St. Thomas (MN)	3	–	4	–	0	3	–	6	–	0
Augsburg	1	–	6	–	0	2	–	8	–	0
Macalester	0	–	7	–	0	0	–	10	–	0
$ – Conference champion; Rankings from NAIA Division I poll

1975 Nebraska Intercollegiate Athletic Conference football standings
	Conf.					Overall
Team	W		L		T	W		L		T
No. 5 Midland $	5	–	0	–	0	9	–	2	–	0
Doane	3	–	1	–	1	6	–	4	–	1
Concordia (NE)	2	–	2	–	1	3	–	6	–	1
Nebraska Wesleyan	2	–	3	–	0	5	–	5	–	0
Hastings	1	–	4	–	0	5	–	4	–	0
Dana	1	–	4	–	0	2	–	6	–	0
$ – Conference champion; Rankings from NAIA Division II poll

1975 North Dakota College Athletic Conference football standings
	Conf.					Overall
Team	W		L		T	W		L		T
No. 11 Jamestown +	4	–	1	–	0	8	–	1	–	0
No. 17 Dickinson State +	4	–	1	–	0	7	–	2	–	0
No. 20 Minot State	3	–	2	–	0	7	–	2	–	0
Valley City State	3	–	2	–	0	7	–	2	–	0
Mayville State	1	–	4	–	0	2	–	6	–	0
Wahpeton Science	0	–	5	–	0	1	–	5	–	0
$ – Conference champion; Rankings from NAIA Division II poll

1975 Northwest Conference football standings
	Conf.					Overall
Team	W		L		T	W		L		T
No. 10 Pacific Lutheran +	6	–	1	–	0	7	–	2	–	0
Whitworth +	6	–	1	–	0	7	–	3	–	0
Linfield +	6	–	1	–	0	6	–	3	–	0
Willamette	4	–	3	–	0	4	–	5	–	0
College of Idaho	3	–	4	–	0	3	–	6	–	0
Lewis & Clark	1	–	6	–	0	2	–	7	–	0
Whitman	1	–	6	–	0	1	–	7	–	0
Pacific (OR)	1	–	6	–	0	1	–	8	–	0
+ – Conference co-champions; Whitman forfeited to Whitworth.; Rankings from NAIA Division II poll

1975 South Dakota Intercollegiate Conference football standings
	Conf.					Overall
Team	W		L		T	W		L		T
Dakota State +	4	–	1	–	0	6	–	3	–	1
South Dakota Tech +	4	–	1	–	0	5	–	4	–	0
Huron	3	–	2	–	0	3	–	6	–	0
Black Hills State	2	–	3	–	0	2	–	8	–	0
Dakota Wesleyan	1	–	4	–	0	4	–	5	–	0
South Dakota–Springfield	1	–	4	–	0	1	–	8	–	0
+ – Conference co-champions

1975 Southern California Intercollegiate Athletic Conference football standings
	Conf.					Overall
Team	W		L		T	W		L		T
Redlands +	4	–	0	–	1	7	–	2	–	1
La Verne +	4	–	0	–	1	6	–	3	–	1
Claremont-Mudd	2	–	3	–	0	4	–	4	–	0
Whittier	2	–	3	–	0	3	–	6	–	1
Occidental	2	–	3	–	0	3	–	5	–	0
Pomona-Pitzer	0	–	5	–	0	0	–	9	–	0
+ – Conference co-champions

1975 Tri-State Conference football standings
	Conf.					Overall
Team	W		L		T	W		L		T
Bethel (MN) +	3	–	1	–	0	7	–	2	–	0
No. 19 Northwestern (IA) +	3	–	1	–	0	7	–	2	–	1
Yankton +	3	–	1	–	0	6	–	4	–	0
Westmar	1	–	3	–	0	2	–	6	–	0
Sioux Falls	0	–	4	–	0	2	–	7	–	0
+ – Conference co-champions; Rankings from NAIA Division II poll

1975 NAIA Division II independents football records
	Conf.			Overall
Team	W	L	T	W		L		T
No. 1 Texas Lutheran ^		–		11	–	1	–	0
No. 2 Cal Lutheran ^		–		10	–	1	–	0
No. 8 Bowie State		–		9	–	1	–	0
No. 7 Westminster (PA)		–		6	–	1	–	1
No. 14 Missouri Western		–		8	–	3	–	1
Azusa Pacific		–		7	–	3	–	0
No. 18 Georgetown (KY)		–		7	–	3	–	0
Missouri Southern		–		7	–	3	–	1
Franklin (IN)		–		6	–	4	–	0
Simon Fraser		–		5	–	4	–	0
Benedictine (KS)		–		5	–	5	–	0
Waynesburg		–		4	–	4	–	1
Austin		–		3	–	5	–	1
Eureka		–		3	–	5	–	1
Iowa Wesleyan		–		2	–	7	–	0
Oklahoma Panhandle State		–		2	–	9	–	0
Geneva		–		0	–	9	–	0
^ – NAIA Division II playoff participant San Diego forfeited a win over Azusa Pacific.; Rankings from NAIA Division II poll

== Postseason ==
Semifinals; Campus sites
Texas Lutheran*	32
Hanover	13
Cal Lutheran*	27
William Penn	0

Championship; Thousand Oaks, CA
Texas Lutheran	34
Cal Lutheran*	8

== See also ==
- 1975 NAIA Division I football season
- 1975 NCAA Division I football season
- 1975 NCAA Division II football season
- 1975 NCAA Division III football season
