= 1975 Texas Lutheran Bulldogs football team =

American college football season

1975 Texas Lutheran Bulldogs football

NAIA Division II national champion

NAIA Division II Championship Game, W 34–8 vs. Cal Lutheran
- Conference: Independent
- Record: 11–1
- Head coach: Jim Wacker (5th season)
- Home stadium: Matador Stadium

1975 NAIA Division II independents football records
	Conf.			Overall
Team	W	L	T	W		L		T
No. 1 Texas Lutheran ^		–		11	–	1	–	0
No. 2 Cal Lutheran ^		–		10	–	1	–	0
No. 8 Bowie State		–		9	–	1	–	0
No. 7 Westminster (PA)		–		6	–	1	–	1
No. 14 Missouri Western		–		8	–	3	–	1
Azusa Pacific		–		7	–	3	–	0
No. 18 Georgetown (KY)		–		7	–	3	–	0
Missouri Southern		–		7	–	3	–	1
Franklin (IN)		–		6	–	4	–	0
Simon Fraser		–		5	–	4	–	0
Benedictine (KS)		–		5	–	5	–	0
Waynesburg		–		4	–	4	–	1
Austin		–		3	–	5	–	1
Eureka		–		3	–	5	–	1
Iowa Wesleyan		–		2	–	7	–	0
Oklahoma Panhandle State		–		2	–	9	–	0
Geneva		–		0	–	9	–	0
^ – NAIA Division II playoff participant San Diego forfeited a win over Azusa Pacific.; Rankings from NAIA Division II poll

The 1975 Texas Lutheran Bulldogs football team was an American football team that represented Texas Lutheran College (later renamed Texas Lutheran University) and won the national championship during the 1975 NAIA Division II football season. In their fifth and final season under head coach Jim Wacker, the Bulldogs compiled an 11–1 record and outscored opponents by a total of 361 to 113. The team's only loss was to Howard Payne. They participated in the NAIA Division II playoffs, defeating Hanover (32–13) in the semifinals and Cal Lutheran (34–8) in the NAIA Division II Championship Game. It was the second of two consecutive national championships for Texas Lutheran.

The team played its home games at Matador Stadium in Seguin, Texas.

== Schedule ==
Date	Opponent	Site	Result	Attendance	Source
September 6	Tarleton State	Matador Stadium; Seguin, TX	W 42–7		
September 13	Southwest Texas State	Matador Stadium; Seguin, TX	W 21–20		
September 20	at Howard Payne	Brownwood, TX	L 12–17		
September 27	Trinity (TX)	Matador Stadium; Seguin, TX	W 14–0		
October 4	at Arkansas Tech	Russellville, AR	W 42–0		
October 18	Prairie View A&M	Matador Stadium; Seguin, TX	W 28–3	6,000	
October 25	at McMurry	Abilene, TX	W 40–6		
November 1	at Harding	Searcy, AR	W 28–6		
November 8	Bishop	Matador Stadium; Seguin, TX	W 47–14		
November 15	Midland Lutheran	Matador Stadium; Seguin, TX (Lutheran Brotherhood Bowl)	W 21–10		
November 22	Hanover	Matador Stadium; Seguin, TX (NAIA Division II semifinal)	W 32–13		
December 6	at Cal Lutheran	Thousand Oaks, CA (NAIA Division II Championship Game)	W 34–8		
