= 1975 Jackson State Tigers football team =

American college football season

1975 Jackson State Tigers football

SWAC co-champion
- Conference: Southwestern Athletic Conference
- Record: 7–3 (4–2 SWAC)
- Head coach: Robert Hill (5th season)
- Home stadium: Mississippi Veterans Memorial Stadium

1975 Southwestern Athletic Conference football standings
	Conf.					Overall
Team	W		L		T	W		L		T
No. 4 Grambling State *	4	–	2	–	0	10	–	2	–	0
No. 9 Southern +	4	–	2	–	0	9	–	3	–	0
No. 7 Jackson State +	4	–	2	–	0	7	–	3	–	0
No. T–19 Alcorn State	3	–	3	–	0	6	–	3	–	1
Mississippi Valley State	3	–	3	–	0	6	–	4	–	0
Texas Southern	2	–	4	–	0	4	–	6	–	0
Prairie View A&M	1	–	5	–	0	3	–	7	–	0
$ – Conference champion; * – Grambling State vacated a share of the conference championship.; Rankings from NCAA Division II AP poll for Grambling State and NAIA Division I poll for Southern and Jackson State

The 1975 Jackson State Tigers football team represented the Jackson State University as a member of the Southwestern Athletic Conference (SWAC) during the 1975 NCAA Division II football season. Led by fifth-year head coach Robert Hill, The Tigers compiled an overall record of 7–3 with a conference mark of 4–2, sharing the SWAC title with Grambling State and Southern.

== Schedule ==
Date	Opponent	Rank	Site	Result	Attendance	Source
September 6	vs. Central State (OH)*		Dillon Stadium; Hartford, CT (Ujima Classic)	W 30–18	5,000	
September 13	Tennessee State*		Mississippi Veterans Memorial Stadium; Jackson, MS	W 43–0	23,000–25,000	
September 20	at Prairie View A&M		Edward L. Blackshear Field; Prairie View, TX	W 49–13	10,000	
September 27	at Mississippi Valley State	No. 5	Magnolia Stadium; Itta Bena, MS	W 14–13	11,300	
October 4	at UNLV*	No. 5	Las Vegas Stadium; Whitney, NV	L 2–39	15,000–15,178	
October 18	Southern	No. 12	Mississippi Veterans Memorial Stadium; Jackson, MS (rivalry)	L 20–21	22,500	
October 25	No. 1 Grambling State		Mississippi Veterans Memorial Stadium; Jackson, MS	W 24–14	25,700–30,000	
November 8	at Texas Southern	No. 12	Astrodome; Houston, TX	W 13–9	5,000	
November 15	at Nebraska–Omaha*	No. 14	Al F. Caniglia Field; Omaha, NE	W 31–13	3,000	
November 27	Alcorn State	No. 12	Mississippi Veterans Memorial Stadium; Jackson, MS (rivalry)	L 6–12	27,000	
*Non-conference game; Rankings from AP Poll released prior to the game
