= 1975 Southern Jaguars football team =

American college football season

1975 Southern Jaguars football

SWAC co-champion

Pelican Bowl, W 15–12 vs. South Carolina State
- Conference: Southwestern Athletic Conference
- Record: 9–3 (4–2 SWAC)
- Head coach: Charles Bates (4th season)
- Home stadium: University Stadium

1975 Southwestern Athletic Conference football standings
	Conf.					Overall
Team	W		L		T	W		L		T
No. 4 Grambling State *	4	–	2	–	0	10	–	2	–	0
No. 9 Southern +	4	–	2	–	0	9	–	3	–	0
No. 7 Jackson State +	4	–	2	–	0	7	–	3	–	0
No. T–19 Alcorn State	3	–	3	–	0	6	–	3	–	1
Mississippi Valley State	3	–	3	–	0	6	–	4	–	0
Texas Southern	2	–	4	–	0	4	–	6	–	0
Prairie View A&M	1	–	5	–	0	3	–	7	–	0
$ – Conference champion; * – Grambling State vacated a share of the conference championship.; Rankings from NCAA Division II AP poll for Grambling State and NAIA Division I poll for Southern and Jackson State

The 1975 Southern Jaguars football team represented Southern University as a member of the Southwestern Athletic Conference (SWAC) during the 1975 NCAA Division II football season. Led by fourth-year head coach Charles Bates, the Jaguars compiled an overall record of 9–3, with a conference record of 4–2, and finished as SWAC co-champion.

== Schedule ==
Date	Opponent	Site	Result	Attendance	Source
September 13	Tuskegee*	University Stadium; Baton Rouge, LA	W 17–3		
September 20	Texas Southern	University Stadium; Baton Rouge, LA	W 35–13		
September 27	at Prairie View A&M	Houston Astrodome; Houston, TX	W 26–0		
October 4	at Mississippi Valley State	Magnolia Stadium; Itta Bena, MS	L 7–14		
October 11	Arkansas–Pine Bluff*	University Stadium; Baton Rouge, LA	W 40–0	18,000	
October 18	at No. 12 Jackson State	Mississippi Veterans Memorial Stadium; Jackson, MS (rivalry)	W 21–20	22,500	
October 25	Alcorn State	University Stadium; Baton Rouge, LA	W 7–3		
November 1	Nebraska–Omaha*	University Stadium; Baton Rouge, LA	W 35–7	19,248	
November 8	at Howard*	Robert F. Kennedy Memorial Stadium; Washington, DC	W 20–0	15,000	
November 15	vs. Florida A&M*	Tampa Stadium; Tampa, FL	L 0–10	18,000	
November 29	vs. No. 3 Grambling State	Louisiana Superdome; New Orleans, LA (Bayou Classic)	L 17–33	73,214	
December 27	vs. South Carolina State*	Louisiana Superdome; New Orleans, LA (Pelican Bowl)	W 15–12	6,748	
*Non-conference game; Rankings from AP Poll released prior to the game
