= 1975 Grambling State Tigers football team =

American college football season

1975 Grambling State Tigers football

Black national co-champion SWAC co-champion (vacated)
- Conference: Southwestern Athletic Conference
- Record: 10–1-Tie 0 (4–1-Tie 0 SWAC)
- Head coach: Eddie Robinson (33rd season)
- Home stadium: Grambling Stadium

1975 Southwestern Athletic Conference football standings
| | Conf. | | | | | Overall |
| Team | W | | L | | T | W | | L | | T |
|---|---|---|---|---|---|---|---|---|---|---|
| No. 4 Grambling State * | 4 | – | 2 | – | 0 | 10 | – | 2 | – | 0 |
| No. 9 Southern + | 4 | – | 2 | – | 0 | 9 | – | 3 | – | 0 |
| No. 7 Jackson State + | 4 | – | 2 | – | 0 | 7 | – | 3 | – | 0 |
| No. T–19 Alcorn State | 3 | – | 3 | – | 0 | 6 | – | 3 | – | 1 |
| Mississippi Valley State | 3 | – | 3 | – | 0 | 6 | – | 4 | – | 0 |
| Texas Southern | 2 | – | 4 | – | 0 | 4 | – | 6 | – | 0 |
| Prairie View A&M | 1 | – | 5 | – | 0 | 3 | – | 7 | – | 0 |
$ – Conference champion; * – Grambling State vacated a share of the conference championship.; Rankings from NCAA Division II AP poll for Grambling State and NAIA Division I poll for Southern and Jackson State

The 1975 Grambling Tigers football team represented Grambling State University as a member of the Southwestern Athletic Conference (SWAC) during the 1975 NCAA Division II football season. In its 33rd season under head coach Eddie Robinson, Grambling compiled a 10–1-1 record (4–1-Tie against conference opponents), initially tied for the SWAC championship, and outscored opponents by a total of 324 to 153 on the field. The team was recognized as the 1975 black college football national co-champion and was ranked No. 4 by the Associated Press and No. 2 by the United Press International in the final 1975 NCAA Division II football rankings.

Key players included sophomore quarterback Doug Williams, receivers Dwight Scales, Carlos Pennywell, and Sammie White, and running backs Fallon Bush and Cliff Martin. Williams later played nine seasons in the National Football League. Dwight Scales went on to play eight seasons in the National Football League .

Grambling inadvertently double-scheduled games on October 4 against Prairie View A&M and Oregon State and opted to play Oregon State, leaving Prairie View idle. Grambling told Prairie View of the scheduling problem in the spring and tried to reschedule the game with Prairie View for November 22, but the negotiations fell through. On November 26, the Southwestern Athletic Conference assessed a loss against Grambling's conference record, declaring the October 4 game against Prairie View to be a forfeit. On December 12, the SWAC commissioner stripped Grambling of its share of the conference co-championship, and then almost to add insult to injury, the athletic directors voted unanimously to send Southern as the SWAC's representative to the Pelican Bowl (over the other remaining co-champ, Jackson State); Grambling had just defeated Southern soundly only two weeks before in the first Bayou Classic to be played in the new Louisiana Superdome, and now the Jaguars could participate in a bowl game being billed as the black national championship. Grambling-produced publications intended for the mass media make no reference to their brief hold on the 1975 co-championship.

== Schedule ==
| Date | Opponent | Rank | Site | Result | Attendance | Source |
|---|---|---|---|---|---|---|
| September 6 | vs. Alcorn State | | Louisiana Superdome; New Orleans, LA | W 27–3 | 61,000 | |
| September 13 | vs. Morgan State* | | Robert F. Kennedy Memorial Stadium; Washington, DC | W 40–7 | 29,112 | |
| September 20 | at Hawaii* | NR/1 | Aloha Stadium; Halawa, HI | W 20–6 | 29,472 | |
| October 4 | at Oregon State* | No. 1/1 | Civic Stadium; Portland, OR | W 19–12 | 16,964 | |
| October 4 | vs. Prairie View A&M | | Cotton Bowl; Dallas, TX (rivalry) | Tie 0-0 | | |
| October 11 | at Tennessee State* | No. 1/1 | Hale Stadium; Nashville, TN | W 28–25 | 17,000–18,200 | |
| October 18 | Mississippi Valley State^{†} | No. 1/1 | Grambling Stadium; Grambling, LA | W 38–22 | 20,118 | |
| October 25 | at Jackson State | No. 1/1 | Mississippi Veterans Memorial Stadium; Jackson, MS | L 14–24 | 25,700–30,000 | |
| November 1 | at Texas Southern | No. 5/5 | Astrodome; Houston, TX | W 37–21 | 46,183 | |
| November 8 | North Carolina A&T* | No. 4/3 | Grambling Stadium; Grambling, LA | W 42–16 | 10,000–12,707 | |
| November 15 | vs. Norfolk State* | No. 4/3 | Shea Stadium; Flushing, NY | W 26–0 | 33,869 | |
| November 29 | vs. Southern | No. 3/2 | Louisiana Superdome; New Orleans, LA (Bayou Classic) | W 33–17 | 73,214 | |
*Non-conference game; ^{†}Homecoming; Rankings from AP/UPI Poll released prior to the game
