= 1975 Alcorn State Braves football team =

American college football season

1975 Alcorn State Braves football
- Conference: Southwestern Athletic Conference
- Record: 6–3–1 (3–3 SWAC)
- Head coach: Marino Casem (12th season)
- Home stadium: Henderson Stadium

1975 Southwestern Athletic Conference football standings
	Conf.					Overall
Team	W		L		T	W		L		T
No. 4 Grambling State *	4	–	2	–	0	10	–	2	–	0
No. 9 Southern +	4	–	2	–	0	9	–	3	–	0
No. 7 Jackson State +	4	–	2	–	0	7	–	3	–	0
No. T–19 Alcorn State	3	–	3	–	0	6	–	3	–	1
Mississippi Valley State	3	–	3	–	0	6	–	4	–	0
Texas Southern	2	–	4	–	0	4	–	6	–	0
Prairie View A&M	1	–	5	–	0	3	–	7	–	0
$ – Conference champion; * – Grambling State vacated a share of the conference championship.; Rankings from NCAA Division II AP poll for Grambling State and NAIA Division I poll for Southern and Jackson State

The 1975 Alcorn State Braves football team represented Alcorn State University as a member of the Southwestern Athletic Conference (SWAC) during the 1975 NCAA Division II football season. Led by twelfth-year head coach Marino Casem, the Braves compiled an overall record of 6–3–1, with a conference record of 3–3, and finished tied for fourth in the SWAC.

== Schedule ==
Date	Opponent	Site	Result	Attendance	Source
September 6	vs. Grambling State	Louisiana Superdome; New Orleans, LA	L 3–27	61,000	
September 20	Delaware State*	Henderson Stadium; Lorman, MS	W 33–7		
September 27	at North Carolina Central*	O'Kelly Stadium; Durham, NC	W 54–7		
October 4	South Carolina State*^{†}	Henderson Stadium; Lorman, MS	T 7–7	12,000	
October 11	at Texas Southern	Astrodome; Houston, TX	W 15–0		
October 25	at Southern	University Stadium; Baton Rouge, LA	L 3–7		
November 1	at Bishop*	P.C. Cobb Stadium; Dallas, TX	W 25–7		
November 8	Mississippi Valley State	Henderson Stadium; Lorman, MS	L 6–15		
November 15	Prairie View A&M	Henderson Stadium; Lorman, MS	W 15–0		
November 27	at No. 12 Jackson State	Mississippi Veterans Memorial Stadium; Jackson, MS (rivalry)	W 12–6	27,000	
*Non-conference game; ^{†}Homecoming; Rankings from AP Poll released prior to the game
