= 1975 NCAA Division II football rankings =

The 1975 NCAA Division II football rankings are from United Press International and from Associated Press. The 1975 NCAA Division II football season was the first year UPI published a Division II poll. 1975 was also the 16th (and last) year AP published a "College Division" poll.

The final UPI poll was released before the Division II playoffs, and the final AP poll was released after the playoffs.

== Legend ==
	Increase in ranking
	Decrease in ranking
	Not ranked previous week
(#–#)	Win–loss record
(Italics)	Number of first place votes
т	Tied with team above or below also with this symbol

== The AP poll ==
	Week 1 Sept 24	Week 2 Oct 1	Week 3 Oct 8	Week 4 Oct 15	Week 5 Oct 22	Week 6 Oct 29	Week 7 Nov 5	Week 8 Nov 12	Week 9 Nov 19	Week 10 Nov 26	Week Postseason	
1.	Grambling State (3–0) (11)	Grambling State (3–0) (18)	Grambling State (4–0) (31)	Grambling State (5–0) (27)	Grambling State (6–0) (34)	Texas A&I (6–0) (24)	Texas A&I (7–0) (30)	Texas A&I (8–0) (29)	Texas A&I (9–0) (29)	Texas A&I (10–0) (29)	Texas A&I (12–0) (27)	1.
2.	Western Kentucky (3–0) (8)	Western Kentucky (4–0) (11)	Western Kentucky (5–0) (7)	Western Kentucky (5–0) (6)	Western Kentucky (6–0) (2)	Eastern Kentucky (6–0–1) (9)	North Dakota (8–0) (4)	North Dakota (9–0) (4)	North Dakota (9–0) (5)	North Dakota (9–0) (6)	Northern Michigan (13–1) (12)	2.
3.	Boise State (2–0) (1)	Boise State (3–0) (4)	Texas A&I (3–0) (2)	Texas A&I (4–0) (3)	Texas A&I (5–0) (3)	North Dakota (7–0) (3)	Boise State (7–0–1) (1)	Boise State (8–0–1)	Grambling State (9–1) (1)	Grambling State (9–2) (1)	Western Kentucky (11–2)	3.
4.	Texas A&I (1–0) (9)	Texas A&I (2–0) (5)	Boise State (4–0)	Idaho State (5–0) (4)	Eastern Kentucky (5–0–1)	Boise State (6–0–1) (2)	Grambling State (7–1) (2)	Grambling State (8–1) (1)	Western Kentucky (8–1)	Western Kentucky (9–1)	Grambling State (9–3) (1)	4.
5.	Jackson State (3–0) (6)	Jackson State (4–0) (1)	Idaho State (4–0)	Eastern Kentucky (5–0–1)	North Dakota (6–0) (3)	Grambling State (6–1) (1)	Wittenberg (8–0) (3)	Western Kentucky (8–1)	Henderson State (10–0)	Northern Michigan (10–1) (1)	Wittenberg (12–1) (1)	5.
6.	Idaho State (2–0) (3)	Idaho State (3–0)	Northern Michigan (5–0) (3)	North Dakota (5–0) (1)	Boise State (5–0–1)	Western Kentucky (6–1)	Western Kentucky (7–1)	Wittenberg (9–0) (2)	Northern Michigan (10–1) (1)	Boise State (9–1–1)	Livingston (10–3)	6.
7.	Eastern Kentucky (2–0–1)	Eastern Kentucky (3–0–1)	Eastern Kentucky (4–0–1)	Boise State (4–0–1)	Wittenberg (6–0)	Wittenberg (7–0) (2)	Eastern Kentucky (6–1–1)	Henderson State (9–0)	Boise State (8–1–1)	Ithaca (9–0) (1)	North Dakota (9–1)	7.
8.	Wittenberg (2–0) (1)	Northern Michigan (4–0) (1)	North Dakota (4–0)	Delaware (4–1)	Henderson State (6–0)	Henderson State (7–0)	Henderson State (8–0)	Lehigh (8–1) (1)	Bethune–Cookman (9–0)	Wittenberg (10–1)	Boise State (9–2–1)	8.
9.	Delaware (1–1) (1)	North Dakota (3–0) (1)	Delaware (3–1)	Wittenberg (5–0)	Northern Michigan (6–1)	Jackson State (5–2) (1)	Idaho State (7–1)	Northern Michigan (9–1)	Ithaca (9–0) (1)	Henderson State (10–1)	New Hampshire (9–3)	9.
10.	Henderson State (2–0)	Delaware (2–1)	Montana (3–0) (2)	Henderson State (5–0)	Montana (4–1)	Idaho State (6–1)	Lehigh (7–1) (2)	Ithaca (9–0) (1)	Wittenberg (9–1)	Northern Iowa (9–2)	Northern Iowa (9–3)	10.
11.	Northern Michigan (3–0) (1)	Wittenberg (3–0)	Wittenberg (4–0)	Ithaca (5–0) (2)	Idaho State (5–1)	Northern Michigan (7–1)	Northern Michigan (8–1)	UMass (8–0) (Note: In the actual printed polls, UMass was listed as Massachusetts)	Jackson State (7–2)	Lehigh (9–2)	Henderson State (11–1)	11.
12.	Youngstown State (2–0) (1)	Henderson State (3–0)	Henderson State (4–0)	Jackson State (4–1)	Ithaca (6–0) (2)	Lehigh (6–1)	Jackson State (5–2)	Bethune–Cookman (8–0)	Northern Iowa (9–2)	Jackson State (7–2)	Eastern Kentucky (8–2–1)	12.
13.	South Dakota State (2–0) (1)	Montana (2–0) (1)	Jackson State (4–1)	Montana (3–1)	Kentucky State (6–1)	Kentucky State (6–1)	Bethune–Cookman (7–0)	Jacksonville State (7–1) (1)	Lehigh (8–2)	Eastern Kentucky (8–2–1)	Ithaca (10–1)	13.
14.	Abilene Christian (1–0)	Ithaca (3–0)	Western Illinois (4–0) (1)	Northern Michigan (5–1)	Delaware (4–2)	Ithaca (6–0) (1)	Ithaca (7–0) (1)	Jackson State (6–2)	Eastern Kentucky (7–2–1)	Bethune–Cookman (9–1)	Salem State (11–1)	14.
15.	North Dakota (2–0)	Abilene Christian (1–1)	Ithaca (4–0) (1)	Kentucky State (5–1) (1)	Lehigh (5–1)	Jacksonville State (5–1)	Kentucky State (7–1)	Northern Colorado (8–0)	UMass (8–1)	Delaware (8–3)	Texas Lutheran (11–1)	15.
16.						Bethune–Cookman (6–0)						16.
	Week 1 Sept 24	Week 2 Oct 1	Week 3 Oct 8	Week 4 Oct 15	Week 5 Oct 22	Week 6 Oct 29	Week 7 Nov 5	Week 8 Nov 12	Week 9 Nov 19	Week 10 Nov 26	Week Postseason	
		Dropped: 12 Youngstown State; 13 South Dakota State	Dropped: 15 Abilene Christian	Dropped: 14 Western Illinois	Dropped: 12 Jackson State	Dropped: 10 Montana; 14 Delaware	Dropped: 15 Jacksonville State	Dropped: 7 Eastern Kentucky; 9 Idaho State; 15 Kentucky State	Dropped: 13 Jacksonville State; 15 Northern Colorado	Dropped: 15 UMass	Dropped: 11 Lehigh; 12 Jackson State; 14 Bethune–Cookman; 15 Delaware	

== The UPI poll ==
	Week 1 Sept 17	Week 2 Sept 24	Week 3 Oct 1	Week 4 Oct 8	Week 5 Oct 15	Week 6 Oct 22	Week 7 Oct 29	Week 8 Nov 5	Week 9 Nov 12	Week 10 Nov 19	Week 11 Nov 26	
1.	Grambling State	Grambling State (3–0)	Grambling State (3–0)	Grambling State (4–0)	Grambling State (5–0)	Grambling State (6–0)	North Dakota (7–0)	North Dakota (8–0)	North Dakota (9–0)	North Dakota (9–0)	North Dakota (9–0)	1.
2.	UNLV (Note: In the actual printed polls, UNLV was listed as Nevada Las Vegas)	Boise State (2–0)	Boise State (3–0)	Idaho State (4–0)	Idaho State (5–0)	Western Kentucky (6–0)	Boise State (6–0–1)	Boise State (7–0–1)	Boise State (8–0–1)	Grambling State (9–1)	Grambling State (9–2)	2.
3.	Delaware	Western Kentucky (3–0)	North Dakota (3–0)	Western Kentucky (5–0)	Western Kentucky (5–0)	North Dakota (6–0)	Eastern Kentucky (6–0–1)	Grambling State (7–1)	Grambling State (8–1)	Western Kentucky (8–1)	Western Kentucky (9–1)	3.
4.	Boise State	Jackson State (3–0)	Idaho State (3–0)	North Dakota (4–0)	North Dakota (5–0)	Boise State (5–0–1)	Grambling State (6–1)	Idaho State (7–1)	Lehigh (8–1)	Northern Michigan (10–1)	Northern Michigan (10–1)	4.
5.	Western Kentucky	Idaho State (2–0)	Western Kentucky (4–0)	Boise State (4–0)	Nicholls State (5–0)	Eastern Kentucky (5–0–1)	Western Kentucky (6–1)	Lehigh (7–1)	Western Kentucky (8–1)	Boise State (8–1–1)	Boise State (9–1–1)	5.
6.	Eastern Kentucky	North Dakota (2–0)	Northern Michigan (4–0)	Northern Michigan (5–0)	Eastern Kentucky (5–0–1)	Nicholls State (5–0)	Idaho State (6–1)	Eastern Kentucky (6–1–1)	UMass (8–0)	Lehigh (8–2)	Lehigh (9–2)	6.
7.	North Dakota	Northern Michigan (3–0)	Alcorn State (2–1)	Montana (3–0)	Boise State (4–0–1)	Montana (4–1)	Lehigh (6–1)	Western Kentucky (7–1)	Southern (8–1)	Northern Iowa (9–2)	Northern Iowa (9–2)	7.
8.	Jackson State	Eastern Kentucky (2–0–1)	Jackson State (4–0)	Western Illinois (4–0)	Montana (3–1)	Idaho State (5–1)	South Carolina State (5–0–1)	Southern (7–1)	Jacksonville State (7–1)	New Hampshire (8–2)	New Hampshire (8–2)	8.
9.	Akron	UNLV (1–1)	Western Illinois (3–0)	Eastern Kentucky (4–0–1)	Delaware (4–1)	Northwest Missouri State (6–0)	UC Davis (6–1)	UMass (7–0)	Northern Colorado (8–0)	UMass (8–1)	Livingston (9–2)	9.
10.	Idaho State	Alcorn State (1–1)	Montana (2–0)	Nicholls State (4–0)	Northwest Missouri State (5–0)	Lehigh (5–1)	Southern (6–1)	Akron (7–2)	Idaho State (7–2)	Idaho State (7–2)	UMass (8–2)	10.
11.		South Dakota State (3–0)				South Carolina State (4–0–1)	Northern Colorado (6–0)					11.
12.						UC Davis (5–1) (Note: In the actual printed polls, UC Davis was listed as California Davis)						12.
	Week 1 Sept 17	Week 2 Sept 24	Week 3 Oct 1	Week 4 Oct 8	Week 5 Oct 15	Week 6 Oct 22	Week 7 Oct 29	Week 8 Nov 5	Week 9 Nov 12	Week 10 Nov 19	Week 11 Nov 26	
		Dropped: 3 Delaware; 9 Akron	Dropped: 8 Eastern Kentucky; 9 UNLV; 10 South Dakota State	Dropped: 7 Alcorn State; 8 Jackson State	Dropped: 6 Northern Michigan; 8 Western Illinois	Dropped: 9 Delaware	Dropped: 6 Nicholls State; 7 Montana; 9 Northwest Missouri State	Dropped: 8 South Carolina State; 9 UC Davis; 10 Northern Colorado	Dropped: 6 Eastern Kentucky; 10 Akron	Dropped: 7 Southern; 8 Jacksonville State; 9 Northern Colorado	Dropped: 10 Idaho State	

== HBCU rankings ==
Jet magazine ranked the top 1975 teams from historically black colleges and universities based on a poll of coaches and conference commissioners.

The poll was published on December 18.

- 1. Grambling State (10–2)
- 2. Florida A&M (9–2)
- 3. South Carolina State (8–2–1)
- 4. Bethune-Cookman (10–1)
- 5. North Carolina A&T (8–3)
- 6. Southern (9–3)
- 7. Jackson State (7–3)
- 8. Kentucky State (8–3)
- 9. Norfolk State (8–3)
- 10. Bowie State (9–1)
- 11. Johnson C. Smith (8–3)
- 12. Alcorn State (6–3–1)
- 13. Mississippi Valley State (6–4)
- 14. Livingstone (7–3–1)
- 15. Howard (8–3)
- 16. Fisk (7–3)
- 17. Virginia Union (6–4)
- 18. Fayetteville State (7–3)
- 19. Tennessee State (5–5)
- 20. Fort Valley State (6–1–2)
