= 1975 NCAA Division II football season =

American college football season

- Regular season: September – November 1975
- Playoffs: November – December 1975
- National Championship: Hughes Stadium; Sacramento, CA
- Champion: Northern Michigan

The 1975 NCAA Division II football season, part of college football in the United States organized by the National Collegiate Athletic Association at the Division II level, began in September and concluded with the Division II Championship on December 13 at Hughes Stadium in Sacramento, California.

Northern Michigan defeated Western Kentucky in the championship game, 16–14, to win their first Division II national title.

== Conference and program changes ==
| School | 1974 Conference | 1975 Conference |
|---|---|---|
| Central Connecticut State | Eastern | Independent |
| Elon | Conference Carolinas (NAIA) | South Atlantic |
| Gardner–Webb | NAIA Independent | South Atlantic |
| Vermont | Yankee | Dropped Program |

== Conference standings ==
1975 Big Sky Conference football standings
| | Conf. | | | | | Overall |
| Team | W | | L | | T | W | | L | | T |
|---|---|---|---|---|---|---|---|---|---|---|
| No. 6 Boise State $^ | 5 | – | 0 | – | 1 | 9 | – | 2 | – | 1 |
| Idaho State | 4 | – | 2 | – | 0 | 7 | – | 3 | – | 0 |
| Montana State | 4 | – | 2 | – | 0 | 5 | – | 5 | – | 0 |
| Idaho | 2 | – | 2 | – | 2 | 4 | – | 5 | – | 2 |
| Montana | 3 | – | 3 | – | 0 | 6 | – | 4 | – | 0 |
| Weber State | 1 | – | 4 | – | 1 | 1 | – | 9 | – | 1 |
| Northern Arizona | 0 | – | 6 | – | 0 | 1 | – | 9 | – | 0 |
$ – Conference champion; ^ – NCAA Division II playoff participant; Rankings from NCAA Division II AP Poll

1975 California Collegiate Athletic Association football standings
| | Conf. | | | | | Overall |
| Team | W | | L | | T | W | | L | | T |
|---|---|---|---|---|---|---|---|---|---|---|
| UC Riverside $ | 4 | – | 0 | – | 0 | 7 | – | 3 | – | 0 |
| Cal Poly | 3 | – | 1 | – | 0 | 6 | – | 4 | – | 0 |
| Cal Poly Pomona | 2 | – | 2 | – | 0 | 6 | – | 4 | – | 1 |
| Cal State Northridge | 1 | – | 3 | – | 0 | 4 | – | 6 | – | 1 |
| Cal State Los Angeles | 0 | – | 4 | – | 0 | 1 | – | 7 | – | 1 |
$ – Conference champion

1975 Central Intercollegiate Athletic Association football standings
| | Conf. | | | | | Overall |
| Team | W | | L | | T | W | | L | | T |
|---|---|---|---|---|---|---|---|---|---|---|
| Norfolk State $ | 7 | – | 1 | – | 0 | 8 | – | 3 | – | 0 |
| Johnson C. Smith | 6 | – | 1 | – | 0 | 8 | – | 3 | – | 0 |
| Virginia Union | 6 | – | 1 | – | 0 | 7 | – | 4 | – | 0 |
| Elizabeth City State | 5 | – | 3 | – | 0 | 5 | – | 4 | – | 0 |
| Hampton | 5 | – | 3 | – | 0 | 5 | – | 5 | – | 0 |
| Fayetteville State | 4 | – | 3 | – | 0 | 7 | – | 3 | – | 0 |
| Livingstone | 3 | – | 3 | – | 1 | 7 | – | 3 | – | 1 |
| Virginia State | 2 | – | 5 | – | 0 | 2 | – | 8 | – | 0 |
| Winston-Salem State | 1 | – | 7 | – | 0 | 1 | – | 9 | – | 0 |
| Shaw | 0 | – | 6 | – | 1 | 1 | – | 8 | – | 1 |
| Saint Paul's (VA) | 0 | – | 7 | – | 0 | 2 | – | 8 | – | 0 |
$ – Conference champion

1975 Far Western Conference football standings
| | Conf. | | | | | Overall |
| Team | W | | L | | T | W | | L | | T |
|---|---|---|---|---|---|---|---|---|---|---|
| UC Davis $ | 5 | – | 0 | – | 0 | 7 | – | 3 | – | 0 |
| Humboldt State | 4 | – | 1 | – | 0 | 7 | – | 3 | – | 0 |
| Sacramento State | 2 | – | 3 | – | 0 | 5 | – | 5 | – | 0 |
| San Francisco State | 2 | – | 3 | – | 0 | 4 | – | 4 | – | 1 |
| Chico State | 2 | – | 3 | – | 0 | 4 | – | 6 | – | 0 |
| Cal State Hayward | 0 | – | 5 | – | 0 | 0 | – | 10 | – | 0 |
$ – Conference champion

1975 Great Lakes Intercollegiate Athletic Conference football standings
| | Conf. | | | | | Overall |
| Team | W | | L | | T | W | | L | | T |
|---|---|---|---|---|---|---|---|---|---|---|
| Wayne State (MI) $ | 3 | – | 1 | – | 0 | 8 | – | 3 | – | 0 |
| No. 15 Grand Valley State | 3 | – | 1 | – | 1 | 7 | – | 2 | – | 1 |
| Northwood | 3 | – | 1 | – | 1 | 5 | – | 4 | – | 1 |
| Hillsdale | 3 | – | 2 | – | 0 | 7 | – | 4 | – | 0 |
| Saginaw Valley State | 1 | – | 3 | – | 0 | 3 | – | 7 | – | 0 |
| Ferris State | 0 | – | 5 | – | 0 | 0 | – | 10 | – | 0 |
$ – Conference champion; Rankings from NAIA Division II poll

1975 Gulf South Conference football standings
| | Conf. | | | | | Overall |
| Team | W | | L | | T | W | | L | | T |
|---|---|---|---|---|---|---|---|---|---|---|
| Nicholls State $ | 7 | – | 2 | – | 0 | 8 | – | 2 | – | 0 |
| No. 6 Livingston ^ | 6 | – | 2 | – | 0 | 10 | – | 3 | – | 0 |
| No. 11 Jacksonville State | 5 | – | 3 | – | 0 | 7 | – | 3 | – | 0 |
| Troy State | 5 | – | 3 | – | 0 | 6 | – | 4 | – | 0 |
| Delta State | 5 | – | 4 | – | 0 | 6 | – | 4 | – | 0 |
| North Alabama | 4 | – | 4 | – | 0 | 6 | – | 4 | – | 0 |
| Mississippi College | 2 | – | 5 | – | 0 | 6 | – | 5 | – | 0 |
| Southeastern Louisiana | 2 | – | 6 | – | 0 | 4 | – | 7 | – | 0 |
| Tennessee–Martin | 1 | – | 7 | – | 0 | 2 | – | 8 | – | 0 |
$ – Conference champion; ^ – NCAA Division II playoff participant; Rankings from NCAA Division II AP poll for Livingston and NAIA Division I poll for Jacksonville State

1975 Indiana Collegiate Conference football standings
| | Conf. | | | | | Overall |
| Team | W | | L | | T | W | | L | | T |
|---|---|---|---|---|---|---|---|---|---|---|
| Butler $ | 6 | – | 0 | – | 0 | 9 | – | 1 | – | 0 |
| Indiana Central ^ | 5 | – | 1 | – | 0 | 8 | – | 3 | – | 0 |
| Evansville | 4 | – | 2 | – | 0 | 7 | – | 3 | – | 0 |
| DePauw | 2 | – | 4 | – | 0 | 5 | – | 5 | – | 0 |
| Valparaiso | 2 | – | 4 | – | 0 | 3 | – | 6 | – | 0 |
| Saint Joseph's (IN) | 2 | – | 4 | – | 0 | 2 | – | 8 | – | 0 |
| Wabash | 0 | – | 6 | – | 0 | 3 | – | 7 | – | 0 |
$ – Conference champion; ^ – NCAA Division III playoff participant

1975 Mid-Eastern Athletic Conference football standings
| | Conf. | | | | | Overall |
| Team | W | | L | | T | W | | L | | T |
|---|---|---|---|---|---|---|---|---|---|---|
| South Carolina State + | 5 | – | 1 | – | 0 | 8 | – | 2 | – | 1 |
| North Carolina A&T + | 5 | – | 1 | – | 0 | 8 | – | 3 | – | 0 |
| Howard | 4 | – | 2 | – | 0 | 8 | – | 3 | – | 0 |
| North Carolina Central | 3 | – | 2 | – | 1 | 5 | – | 4 | – | 1 |
| Delaware State | 2 | – | 4 | – | 0 | 5 | – | 5 | – | 0 |
| Morgan State | 1 | – | 4 | – | 1 | 4 | – | 5 | – | 1 |
| Maryland Eastern Shore | 0 | – | 6 | – | 0 | 0 | – | 10 | – | 0 |
+ – Conference co-champions

1975 Missouri Intercollegiate Athletic Association football standings
| | Conf. | | | | | Overall |
| Team | W | | L | | T | W | | L | | T |
|---|---|---|---|---|---|---|---|---|---|---|
| SE Missouri State $ | 6 | – | 0 | – | 0 | 7 | – | 4 | – | 0 |
| NE Missouri State | 4 | – | 2 | – | 0 | 7 | – | 4 | – | 0 |
| NW Missouri State | 3 | – | 3 | – | 0 | 7 | – | 3 | – | 0 |
| SW Missouri State | 3 | – | 3 | – | 0 | 6 | – | 4 | – | 1 |
| Central Missouri State | 2 | – | 4 | – | 0 | 5 | – | 5 | – | 0 |
| Lincoln (MO) | 2 | – | 4 | – | 0 | 4 | – | 7 | – | 0 |
| Missouri–Rolla | 1 | – | 5 | – | 0 | 1 | – | 8 | – | 2 |
$ – Conference champion

1975 North Central Conference football standings
| | Conf. | | | | | Overall |
| Team | W | | L | | T | W | | L | | T |
|---|---|---|---|---|---|---|---|---|---|---|
| No. 7 North Dakota $^ | 7 | – | 0 | – | 0 | 9 | – | 1 | – | 0 |
| No. 10 Northern Iowa ^ | 6 | – | 1 | – | 0 | 9 | – | 3 | – | 0 |
| Augustana (SD) | 5 | – | 2 | – | 0 | 7 | – | 3 | – | 0 |
| South Dakota State | 4 | – | 3 | – | 0 | 7 | – | 4 | – | 0 |
| Mankato State | 2 | – | 5 | – | 0 | 3 | – | 6 | – | 0 |
| Morningside | 2 | – | 5 | – | 0 | 3 | – | 6 | – | 0 |
| South Dakota | 1 | – | 6 | – | 0 | 3 | – | 8 | – | 0 |
| North Dakota State | 1 | – | 6 | – | 0 | 2 | – | 7 | – | 0 |
$ – Conference champion; ^ – NCAA Division II playoff participant; Rankings from AP Poll

1975 Northern Intercollegiate Conference football standings
| | Conf. | | | | | Overall |
| Team | W | | L | | T | W | | L | | T |
|---|---|---|---|---|---|---|---|---|---|---|
| No. 10 Minnesota Morris $ | 6 | – | 0 | – | 0 | 8 | – | 1 | – | 0 |
| St. Cloud State | 5 | – | 1 | – | 0 | 7 | – | 3 | – | 0 |
| Michigan Tech | 4 | – | 2 | – | 0 | 7 | – | 2 | – | 0 |
| Winona State | 3 | – | 3 | – | 0 | 5 | – | 4 | – | 0 |
| Moorhead State | 2 | – | 4 | – | 0 | 2 | – | 7 | – | 0 |
| Bemidji State | 1 | – | 5 | – | 0 | 2 | – | 7 | – | 0 |
| Southwest State (MN) | 0 | – | 6 | – | 0 | 1 | – | 7 | – | 0 |
$ – Conference champion; Rankings from NAIA Division I poll

1975 Ohio Valley Conference football standings
| | Conf. | | | | | Overall |
| Team | W | | L | | T | W | | L | | T |
|---|---|---|---|---|---|---|---|---|---|---|
| No. 3 Western Kentucky ^ | 6 | – | 1 | – | 0 | 9 | – | 1 | – | 0 |
| Tennessee Tech $ | 6 | – | 1 | – | 0 | 8 | – | 3 | – | 0 |
| No. 12 Eastern Kentucky | 5 | – | 2 | – | 0 | 8 | – | 2 | – | 1 |
| Murray State | 3 | – | 3 | – | 1 | 4 | – | 5 | – | 1 |
| Austin Peay | 3 | – | 4 | – | 0 | 3 | – | 8 | – | 0 |
| Middle Tennessee | 2 | – | 5 | – | 0 | 4 | – | 7 | – | 0 |
| East Tennessee State | 1 | – | 5 | – | 1 | 2 | – | 8 | – | 1 |
| Morehead State | 1 | – | 6 | – | 0 | 3 | – | 7 | – | 0 |
$ – Conference champion; ^ – NCAA Division II playoff participant; WKU claims a co-championship, while both the OVC and Tennessee Tech state it is not shared; Rankings from Associated Press poll

1975 Pennsylvania State Athletic Conference football standings
| | Conf. | | | | | Overall |
| Team | W | | L | | T | W | | L | | T |
|---|---|---|---|---|---|---|---|---|---|---|
East Division
| East Stroudsburg xy$ | 6 | – | 0 | – | 0 | 10 | – | 0 | – | 0 |
| Millersville | 4 | – | 2 | – | 0 | 6 | – | 3 | – | 0 |
| West Chester | 3 | – | 2 | – | 0 | 4 | – | 5 | – | 0 |
| Kutztown | 3 | – | 3 | – | 0 | 3 | – | 5 | – | 1 |
| Mansfield | 2 | – | 3 | – | 0 | 5 | – | 4 | – | 0 |
| Cheyney | 2 | – | 4 | – | 0 | 4 | – | 6 | – | 0 |
| Bloomsburg | 0 | – | 6 | – | 0 | 1 | – | 8 | – | 0 |
West Division
| Edinboro xy | 6 | – | 0 | – | 0 | 8 | – | 3 | – | 0 |
| IUP | 4 | – | 1 | – | 1 | 8 | – | 1 | – | 1 |
| Clarion | 3 | – | 2 | – | 1 | 6 | – | 2 | – | 1 |
| Shippensburg | 3 | – | 3 | – | 0 | 6 | – | 5 | – | 0 |
| Slippery Rock | 3 | – | 3 | – | 0 | 4 | – | 5 | – | 0 |
| Lock Haven | 1 | – | 5 | – | 0 | 1 | – | 8 | – | 0 |
| California (PA) | 0 | – | 6 | – | 0 | 0 | – | 8 | – | 0 |
Championship: East Stroudsburg 24, Edinboro 20
$ – Conference champion; x – Division champion/co-champions; y – Championship game participant

1975 Southern Intercollegiate Athletic Conference football standings
| | Conf. | | | | | Overall |
| Team | W | | L | | T | W | | L | | T |
|---|---|---|---|---|---|---|---|---|---|---|
Division I
| Bethune–Cookman x | 4 | – | 1 | – | 0 | 10 | – | 1 | – | 0 |
| Florida A&M | 4 | – | 1 | – | 0 | 9 | – | 2 | – | 0 |
| Tuskegee | 3 | – | 2 | – | 0 | 5 | – | 5 | – | 0 |
| Albany State | 3 | – | 2 | – | 0 | 3 | – | 6 | – | 0 |
| Alabama A&M | 2 | – | 3 | – | 0 | 3 | – | 8 | – | 0 |
| Alabama State | 1 | – | 4 | – | 0 | 5 | – | 6 | – | 0 |
| Morris Brown | 0 | – | 5 | – | 0 | 3 | – | 6 | – | 0 |
Division II
| Fisk x | 5 | – | 0 | – | 0 | 7 | – | 2 | – | 0 |
| Fort Valley State | 4 | – | 0 | – | 1 | 6 | – | 0 | – | 2 |
| Savannah State | 2 | – | 2 | – | 0 | 3 | – | 7 | – | 0 |
| Lane | 2 | – | 2 | – | 0 | 2 | – | 6 | – | 0 |
| Knoxville | 2 | – | 3 | – | 0 | 5 | – | 4 | – | 1 |
| Miles | 2 | – | 3 | – | 0 | 4 | – | 6 | – | 0 |
| Clark (GA) | 1 | – | 3 | – | 1 | 4 | – | 4 | – | 1 |
| Morehouse | 0 | – | 5 | – | 0 | 0 | – | 9 | – | 0 |
x – Division champion/co-champions

1975 Southwestern Athletic Conference football standings
| | Conf. | | | | | Overall |
| Team | W | | L | | T | W | | L | | T |
|---|---|---|---|---|---|---|---|---|---|---|
| No. 4 Grambling State * | 4 | – | 2 | – | 0 | 10 | – | 2 | – | 0 |
| No. 9 Southern + | 4 | – | 2 | – | 0 | 9 | – | 3 | – | 0 |
| No. 7 Jackson State + | 4 | – | 2 | – | 0 | 7 | – | 3 | – | 0 |
| No. T–19 Alcorn State | 3 | – | 3 | – | 0 | 6 | – | 3 | – | 1 |
| Mississippi Valley State | 3 | – | 3 | – | 0 | 6 | – | 4 | – | 0 |
| Texas Southern | 2 | – | 4 | – | 0 | 4 | – | 6 | – | 0 |
| Prairie View A&M | 1 | – | 5 | – | 0 | 3 | – | 7 | – | 0 |
$ – Conference champion; * – Grambling State vacated a share of the conference championship.; Rankings from NCAA Division II AP poll for Grambling State and NAIA Division I poll for Southern and Jackson State

1975 Virginia College Athletic Association football standings
| | Conf. | | | | | Overall |
| Team | W | | L | | T | W | | L | | T |
|---|---|---|---|---|---|---|---|---|---|---|
| Madison $ | 5 | – | 0 | – | 0 | 9 | – | 0 | – | 1 |
| Virginia Union | 2 | – | 0 | – | 0 | 7 | – | 4 | – | 0 |
| Hampden–Sydney | 4 | – | 1 | – | 0 | 7 | – | 2 | – | 0 |
| Virginia State | 2 | – | 1 | – | 0 | 2 | – | 8 | – | 0 |
| Randolph–Macon | 3 | – | 2 | – | 0 | 6 | – | 4 | – | 0 |
| Hampton | 1 | – | 2 | – | 0 | 5 | – | 5 | – | 0 |
| Saint Paul's (VA) | 1 | – | 2 | – | 0 | 2 | – | 8 | – | 0 |
| Emory & Henry | 0 | – | 3 | – | 0 | 2 | – | 9 | – | 0 |
| Washington and Lee | 0 | – | 3 | – | 0 | 1 | – | 8 | – | 1 |
| Bridgewater | 0 | – | 4 | – | 0 | 2 | – | 7 | – | 0 |
$ – Conference champion

1975 West Virginia Intercollegiate Athletic Conference football standings
| | Conf. | | | | | Overall |
| Team | W | | L | | T | W | | L | | T |
|---|---|---|---|---|---|---|---|---|---|---|
Northern Division
| No. 3 Salem xy$^ | 4 | – | 0 | – | 0 | 11 | – | 1 | – | 0 |
| Shepherd | 2 | – | 2 | – | 0 | 8 | – | 3 | – | 0 |
| Fairmont State | 2 | – | 2 | – | 0 | 6 | – | 4 | – | 0 |
| West Liberty State | 2 | – | 2 | – | 0 | 3 | – | 4 | – | 2 |
| West Virginia Wesleyan | 0 | – | 4 | – | 0 | 5 | – | 5 | – | 0 |
Southern Division
| Concord xy | 4 | – | 0 | – | 0 | 6 | – | 5 | – | 0 |
| West Virginia State | 2 | – | 2 | – | 0 | 3 | – | 6 | – | 1 |
| Glenville State | 2 | – | 2 | – | 0 | 2 | – | 6 | – | 1 |
| West Virginia Tech | 1 | – | 3 | – | 0 | 2 | – | 7 | – | 0 |
| Bluefield State | 1 | – | 3 | – | 0 | 1 | – | 9 | – | 0 |
Championship: Salem 27, Concord 10
$ – Conference champion; x – Division champion/co-champions; y – Championship game participant; ^ – NAIA Division I playoff participant Conference standings based on power ratings; Rankings from NAIA Division I poll

1975 Yankee Conference football standings
| | Conf. | | | | | Overall |
| Team | W | | L | | T | W | | L | | T |
|---|---|---|---|---|---|---|---|---|---|---|
| No. 9 New Hampshire $^ | 5 | – | 0 | – | 0 | 9 | – | 3 | – | 0 |
| UMass | 4 | – | 1 | – | 0 | 8 | – | 2 | – | 0 |
| Connecticut | 3 | – | 2 | – | 0 | 4 | – | 7 | – | 0 |
| Boston University | 1 | – | 4 | – | 0 | 5 | – | 6 | – | 0 |
| Maine | 1 | – | 4 | – | 0 | 4 | – | 6 | – | 0 |
| Rhode Island | 1 | – | 4 | – | 0 | 2 | – | 8 | – | 0 |
$ – Conference champion; ^ – NCAA Division II playoff participant; Rankings from Associated Press poll

1975 NCAA Division II independents football records
| | Conf. | | | Overall |
| Team | W | L | T | W | | L | | T |
|---|---|---|---|---|---|---|---|---|
| No. 2 Northern Michigan ^ | | – | | 13 | – | 1 | – | 0 |
| American International | | – | | 8 | – | 1 | – | 0 |
| Lehigh ^ | | – | | 9 | – | 3 | – | 0 |
| Delaware | | – | | 8 | – | 3 | – | 0 |
| Portland State | | – | | 8 | – | 3 | – | 0 |
| Akron | | – | | 7 | – | 4 | – | 0 |
| Kentucky State | | – | | 7 | – | 4 | – | 0 |
| UNLV | | – | | 7 | – | 4 | – | 0 |
| Santa Clara | | – | | 6 | – | 5 | – | 0 |
| Tennessee State | | – | | 5 | – | 4 | – | 0 |
| Youngstown State | | – | | 5 | – | 4 | – | 0 |
| Chattanooga | | – | | 5 | – | 5 | – | 1 |
| Bucknell | | – | | 5 | – | 5 | – | 0 |
| Indiana State | | – | | 5 | – | 5 | – | 0 |
| Lafayette | | – | | 5 | – | 5 | – | 0 |
| Southern Connecticut State | | – | | 5 | – | 5 | – | 0 |
| Central Connecticut | | – | | 4 | – | 5 | – | 0 |
| Central State (OH) | | – | | 4 | – | 6 | – | 0 |
| Eastern Michigan | | – | | 4 | – | 6 | – | 0 |
| Eastern Illinois | | – | | 3 | – | 5 | – | 2 |
| Northeastern | | – | | 3 | – | 6 | – | 0 |
| Western Carolina | | – | | 3 | – | 7 | – | 0 |
| Nevada | | – | | 3 | – | 8 | – | 0 |
| Nebraska–Omaha | | – | | 2 | – | 9 | – | 0 |
| Arkansas–Pine Bluff | | – | | 0 | – | 11 | – | 0 |
^ – NCAA Division II playoff participant; Rankings from AP Poll

== Conference summaries ==
| Conference | Champion(s) |
|---|---|
| Big Sky Conference | Boise State |
| Central Intercollegiate Athletic Association | Norfolk State |
| Far Western Football Conference | UC Davis |
| Great Lakes Intercollegiate Athletic Conference | Wayne State (MI) |
| Gulf South Conference | Nicholls State |
| Indiana Collegiate Conference | Butler |
| Missouri Intercollegiate Athletic Association | Southeast Missouri State |
| North Central Conference | North Dakota |
| Northern Intercollegiate Conference | Minnesota–Morris |
| Pennsylvania State Athletic Conference | East Stroudsburg State |
| Southern Intercollegiate Athletic Conference (Division II) | Bethune-Cookman |
| Yankee Conference | New Hampshire |

== Postseason ==
1975 NCAA Division II Football Championship
- Teams: 8
- Finals Site: Charles C. Hughes Stadium; Sacramento, California
- Champion: Northern Michigan; (1st title, 1st title game)
- Runner-up: Western Kentucky; (2nd title game)
- Semifinalists: Livingston; New Hampshire
- Winning coach: Gil Krueger; 1st championship

The 1975 NCAA Division II Football Championship playoffs were the third single-elimination tournament to determine the national champion of NCAA Division II college football.

The four quarterfinal games were played on campus and all four host teams lost. The semifinals were the Pioneer Bowl in Wichita Falls, Texas, and the Grantland Rice Bowl in Baton Rouge, Louisiana.

The championship game was the Camellia Bowl, held at Hughes Stadium in Sacramento, California for the third and final time. The Northern Michigan Wildcats defeated the Western Kentucky Hilltoppers 16–14 to win their first national title. Of all current members of Division II, as of 2015, Northern Michigan was the first to win the playoff national championship. They went from winless (0–10) in 1974 to 13–1 and national champions in 1975, led by sophomore quarterback Steve Mariucci, later a head coach in the NFL for nine seasons.

=== Playoff bracket ===
First round Campus sites November 29
Northern Michigan | 24
Boise State * | 21
Livingston | 34
North Dakota * | 14
Western Kentucky | 14
Northern Iowa * | 12
New Hampshire | 35
Lehigh * | 21

Semifinals; Pioneer Bowl; Grantland Rice Bowl; December 6
Northern Michigan | 28
Livingston | 26
Western Kentucky | 14
New Hampshire | 3

Championship; Camellia Bowl; Hughes Stadium; Sacramento, CA; December 13
Northern Michigan | 16
Western Kentucky | 14

* Denotes host institution

== See also ==
- 1975 NCAA Division I football season
- 1975 NCAA Division III football season
- 1975 NAIA Division I football season
- 1975 NAIA Division II football season
