= 1976 NFL draft =

National Football League draft

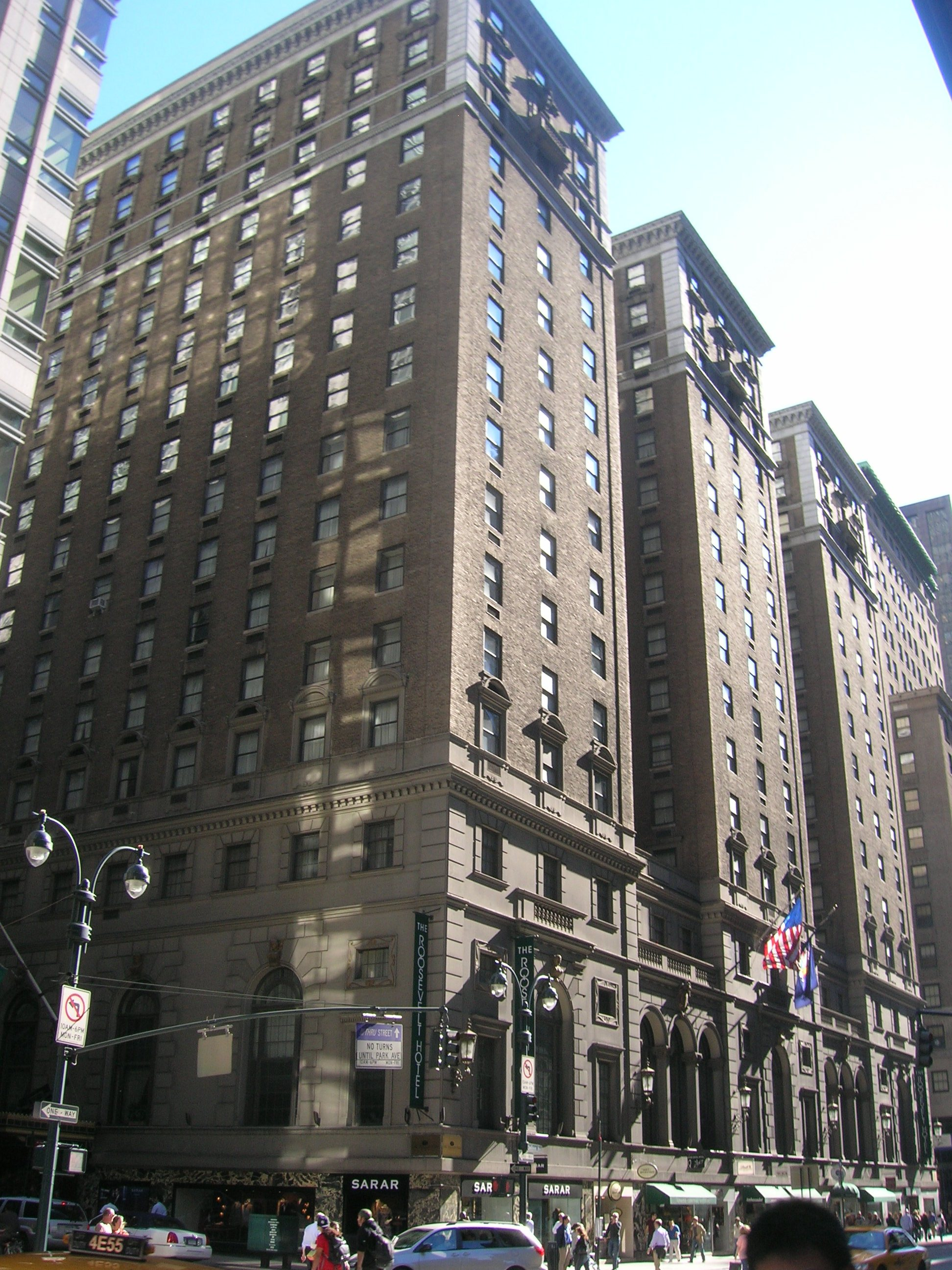
- Roosevelt Hotel (location of the draft), photographed in 2008

General information
- Date: April 8–9, 1976
- Location: Roosevelt Hotel in New York City, New York

Overview
- 487 total selections in 17 rounds
- League: NFL
- First selection: Lee Roy Selmon, DE; Tampa Bay Buccaneers
- Mr. Irrelevant: Kelvin Kirk, WR; Pittsburgh Steelers
- Most selections (25): Seattle Seahawks
- Fewest selections (11): Washington Redskins
- Hall of Famers: 5: DE Lee Roy Selmon; CB Mike Haynes; OT Jackie Slater; LB Harry Carson; WR Steve Largent

The 1976 NFL draft was an annual player selection meeting held April 8–9, 1976, at the Roosevelt Hotel in New York City, New York.

The draft lasted 17 rounds, with the expansion Tampa Bay Buccaneers and Seattle Seahawks making the first two selections. The Buccaneers were awarded the first overall pick of the draft after winning a draw over the Seahawks, and used that pick to select defensive tackle Lee Roy Selmon. The expansion teams were also given a pair of extra picks at the end of each of rounds 2–5. The 1976 draft was the final NFL draft to last seventeen rounds; it was reduced to twelve rounds in 1977, and it was the first draft to officially have the infamous unofficial award, "Mr. Irrelevant", for the final player selected. Like 1974, the 1976 draft is generally regarded as one of the worst quarterback draft classes of all time. No quarterback from the 1976 draft class ever reached the Pro Bowl, an All-Pro team or a Super Bowl, and according to the estimate of Eldorado this quarterback class was the second-worst after 1996. Only first round pick Richard Todd, who led the New York Jets to their first postseason appearances since Super Bowl III in 1981 and 1982, was ever a regular starter.

Five teams lost picks as a penalty for illegally signing former World Football League players: the New York Giants and Chicago Bears lost sixth-round picks, the Washington Redskins lost their seventh-round pick, and the Atlanta Falcons and New York Jets lost their tenth-round selections.

The college draft was originally scheduled for February 3–4, but was postponed when the owners of the Seahawks and Buccaneers filed a lawsuit against the players' union with worries that the organization would try to prevent the expansion draft. The court case delayed both the expansion draft and the annual college draft.

== Player selections ==
= Pro Bowler	= Hall of Famer

*	= compensatory selection
†	= Pro Bowler
‡	= Hall of Famer

Positions key
Offense	Defense	Special teams
QB — Quarterback; RB — Running back; FB — Fullback; WR — Wide receiver; TE — Tight end; OL — Offensive lineman; T — Tackle; G — Guard; C — Center	DL — Defensive lineman; DT — Defensive tackle (Note: Includes nose tackle (NT)); DE — Defensive end; EDGE — Edge rusher; LB — Linebacker (Note: Includes middle linebacker (MLB/MIKE), weakside linebacker (WILL), strongside linebacker (SAM), off-ball linebacker, and outside linebacker (OLB)); DB — Defensive back; CB — Cornerback; S — Safety (Note: Includes free safety (FS) and strong safety (SS))	K — Kicker (Note: Also known as a placekicker (PK)); P — Punter; LS — Long snapper; RS — Return specialist (Note: Includes kickoff and punt returners)

=== Round 1–14 ===
Rnd.	Pick	Team	Player	Pos.	College	Notes
1	1	Tampa Bay Buccaneers	Lee Roy Selmon^{‡}^{†}	DE	Oklahoma	Expansion Pick
1	2	Seattle Seahawks	Steve Niehaus	DT	Notre Dame	Expansion Pick
1	3	New Orleans Saints	Chuck Muncie ^{†}	RB	California	
1	4	San Diego Chargers	Joe Washington ^{†}	RB	Oklahoma	
1	5	New England Patriots	Mike Haynes^{‡}^{†}	CB	Arizona State	
1	6	New York Jets	Richard Todd	QB	Alabama	
1	7	Cleveland Browns	Mike Pruitt ^{†}	RB	Purdue	
1	8	Chicago Bears	Dennis Lick	T	Wisconsin	from Green Bay via Los Angeles through Detroit
1	9	Atlanta Falcons	Bubba Bean	RB	Texas A&M	
1	10	Detroit Lions	James Hunter	CB	Grambling State	from Chicago
1	11	Cincinnati Bengals	Billy Brooks	WR	Oklahoma	from Philadelphia
1	12	New England Patriots	Pete Brock	C	Colorado	from San Francisco
1	13	New York Giants	Troy Archer	DE	Colorado	
1	14	Kansas City Chiefs	Rod Walters	G	Iowa	
1	15	Denver Broncos	Tom Glassic	G	Virginia	
1	16	Detroit Lions	Lawrence Gaines	RB	Wyoming	
1	17	Miami Dolphins	Larry Gordon	LB	Arizona State	from Washington
1	18	Buffalo Bills	Mario Clark	CB	Oregon	
1	19	Miami Dolphins	Kim Bokamper ^{†}	LB	San Jose State	
1	20	Baltimore Colts	Ken Novak	DT	Purdue	
1	21	New England Patriots	Tim Fox ^{†}	S	Ohio State	Houston via San Francisco
1	22	St. Louis Cardinals	Mike Dawson	DT	Arizona	
1	23	Green Bay Packers	Mark Koncar	T	Colorado	from Oakland
1	24	Cincinnati Bengals	Archie Griffin	RB	Ohio State	1974 and 1975 Heisman Trophy winner
1	25	Minnesota Vikings	James White	DT	Oklahoma State	
1	26	Los Angeles Rams	Kevin McLain	LB	Colorado State	
1	27	Dallas Cowboys	Aaron Kyle	CB	Wyoming	
1	28	Pittsburgh Steelers	Bennie Cunningham	TE	Clemson	
2	29	Seattle Seahawks	Sammy Green	LB	Florida	Expansion Pick
2	30	Tampa Bay Buccaneers	Jimmy DuBose	RB	Florida	Expansion Pick
2	31	San Diego Chargers	Don Macek	G	Boston College	
2	32	New Orleans Saints	Tony Galbreath	RB	Missouri	
2	33	New York Jets	Shafer Suggs	S	Ball State	
2	34	Oakland Raiders	Charles Philyaw	DT	Texas Southern	from Cleveland
2	35	New England Patriots	Ike Forte	RB	Arkansas	
2	36	Atlanta Falcons	Sonny Collins	RB	Kentucky	
2	37	Pittsburgh Steelers	Ray Pinney	G	Washington	from Chicago
2	38	Cincinnati Bengals	Glenn Bujnoch	G	Texas A&M	from Philadelphia
2	39	Los Angeles Rams	Pat Thomas ^{†}	CB	Texas A&M	from Green Bay
2	40	Dallas Cowboys	Jim Jensen	RB	Iowa	from N. Y. Giants
2	41	Kansas City Chiefs	Cliff Frazier	DT	UCLA	
2	42	San Francisco 49ers	Randy Cross ^{†}	C	UCLA	
2	43	Denver Broncos	Kurt Knoff	S	Kansas	
2	44	Detroit Lions	Ken Long	G	Purdue	
2	45	Buffalo Bills	Ken Jones	G	Arkansas State	
2	46	Detroit Lions	David Hill	TE	Texas A&I	From Washington through San Diego
2	47	Pittsburgh Steelers	Mike Kruczek	QB	Boston College	from Baltimore
2	48	Houston Oilers	Mike Barber	TE	Louisiana Tech	
2	49	Miami Dolphins	Loaird McCreary	TE	Tennessee State	
2	50	Oakland Raiders	Jeb Blount	QB	Tulsa	
2	51	Cincinnati Bengals	Chris Bahr	K	Penn State	
2	52	Buffalo Bills	Joe Devlin	T	Iowa	from St. Louis
2	53	Los Angeles Rams	Ron McCartney	LB	Tennessee	
2	54	Minnesota Vikings	Sammy White ^{†}	WR	Grambling State	
2	55	Dallas Cowboys	Jim Eidson	G	Mississippi State	
2	56	Pittsburgh Steelers	James Files	C	McNeese State	
2	57	San Francisco 49ers	Eddie Lewis	DB	Kansas	From Tampa Bay Buccaneers (Expansion Pick)
2	58	Seattle Seahawks	Sherman Smith	RB	Miami (OH)	Expansion Pick
2	59	Seattle Seahawks	Steve Raible	WR	Georgia Tech	Expansion Pick
2	60	Tampa Bay Buccaneers	Dewey Selmon	DT	Oklahoma	Expansion Pick
3	61	Tampa Bay Buccaneers	Steve Young	T	Colorado	
3	62	Seattle Seahawks	Jeff Lloyd	DE	West Texas A&M	
3	63	Kansas City Chiefs	Keith Simons	DT	Minnesota	from New Orleans via San Francisco
3	64	San Diego Chargers	Larry Dorsey	WR	Tennessee State	
3	65	Cleveland Browns	Dave Logan	WR	Colorado	
3	66	Chicago Bears	Brian Baschnagel	WR	Ohio State	from New England
3	67	New York Jets	Greg Buttle	LB	Penn State	
3	68	Detroit Lions	Russ Bolinger	T	Long Beach State	from Chicago
3	69	Cincinnati Bengals	Danny Reece	CB	USC	from Philadelphia
3	70	Pittsburgh Steelers	Ron Coder	DT	Penn State	from Green Bay
3	71	Atlanta Falcons	Dave Scott	T	Kansas	
3	72	Green Bay Packers	Mike McCoy	CB	Colorado	from Kansas City
3	73	Dallas Cowboys	Duke Fergerson	WR	San Diego State	from San Francisco
3	74	Kansas City Chiefs	Gary Barbaro ^{†}	S	Nicholls State	from N. Y. Giants via Green Bay
3	75	Dallas Cowboys	John Smith	RB	Boise State	from Denver
3	76	Detroit Lions	John Woodcock	DT	Hawaii	
3	77	New Orleans Saints	Bob Simmons	T	Texas	from Washington via San Diego
3	78	Buffalo Bills	Ben Williams ^{†}	DE	Ole Miss	
3	79	Kansas City Chiefs	Henry Marshall	WR	Missouri	from Houston
3	80	Miami Dolphins	Duriel Harris	WR	New Mexico State	
3	81	Baltimore Colts	Ed Simonini	LB	Texas A&M	
3	82	Cincinnati Bengals	Reggie Williams	LB	Dartmouth	
3	83	St. Louis Cardinals	Brad Oates	T	BYU	
3	84	Oakland Raiders	Rik Bonness	C	Nebraska	
3	85	Minnesota Vikings	Wes Hamilton	G	Tulsa	
3	86	Los Angeles Rams	Jackie Slater^{‡}^{†}	T	Jackson State	
3	87	Dallas Cowboys	Butch Johnson	WR	UC Riverside	
3	88	Pittsburgh Steelers	Ernie Pough	WR	Texas Southern	
3	89	Seattle Seahawks	Rick Engles	P	Tulsa	
3	90	Baltimore Colts	Ron Lee	RB	West Virginia	
3	91	Tampa Bay Buccaneers	Steve Maughan	LB	Utah State	
3	92	Seattle Seahawks	Don Bitterlich	K	Temple	
4	93	Seattle Seahawks	Steve Myer	QB	New Mexico	
4	94	Los Angeles Rams	Gerald Taylor	WR	Texas A&I	from Tampa Bay
4	95	San Diego Chargers	Bob Horn	LB	Oregon State	
4	96	New Orleans Saints	Tinker Owens	WR	Oklahoma	
4	97	Cleveland Browns	Gene Swick	QB	Toledo	from New England via Philadelphia
4	98	Miami Dolphins	Melvin Mitchell	G	Tennessee State	from N. Y. Jets via Chicago
4	99	Cleveland Browns	Richard St. Clair	DE	Grambling State	
4	100	San Francisco 49ers	Steve Rivera	WR	California	from Philadelphia
4	101	Green Bay Packers	Tom Perko	LB	Pittsburgh	
4	102	Atlanta Falcons	Walt Brett	DE	Montana	
4	103	Chicago Bears	John Sciarra	S	UCLA	
4	104	New York Giants	Gordon Bell	RB	Michigan	
4	105	New York Giants	Harry Carson^{‡}^{†}	LB	South Carolina State	
4	106	Cincinnati Bengals	Tony Davis	RB	Nebraska	from Kansas City
4	107	Denver Broncos	Craig Penrose	QB	San Diego State	
4	108	Chicago Bears	Wayne Rhodes	DB	Alabama	from Detroit via Miami
4	109	Buffalo Bills	Dan Jilek	LB	Michigan	
4	110	Oakland Raiders	Herb McMath	LB	Morningside	from Washington via San Diego
4	111	Philadelphia Eagles	Mike Smith	DE	Florida	from Miami
4	112	Pittsburgh Steelers	Wonder Monds	DB	Nebraska	from Baltimore
4	113	San Diego Chargers	Ron Singleton	TE	Grambling State	from Houston via Oakland
4	114	St. Louis Cardinals	Pat Tilley ^{†}	WR	Louisiana Tech	
4	115	San Diego Chargers	Artie Owens	WR	West Virginia	from Oakland
4	116	Cincinnati Bengals	Greg Fairchild	G	Tulsa	
4	117	Houston Oilers	Steve Largent^{‡}^{†}	WR	Tulsa	from Los Angeles via Philadelphia through Green Bay
4	118	Minnesota Vikings	Leonard Willis	WR	Ohio State	
4	119	Dallas Cowboys	Tom Rafferty	G	Penn State	
4	120	Pittsburgh Steelers	Theo Bell	WR	Arizona	
4	121	Tampa Bay Buccaneers	Richard Appleby	WR	Georgia	
4	122	Seattle Seahawks	Randy Johnson	G	Georgia	
4	123	Seattle Seahawks	Andrew Bolton	RB	Fisk	
4	124	Tampa Bay Buccaneers	Everett Little	G	Houston	
5	125	Tampa Bay Buccaneers	Michael Kelson	DB	West Texas State	
5	126	Seattle Seahawks	Don Dufek	S	Michigan	
5	127	New Orleans Saints	Scott Parrish	T	Utah State	
5	128	Los Angeles Rams	Carl Ekern ^{†}	LB	San Jose State	from San Diego
5	129	New York Jets	Steve King	T	Michigan	
5	130	Cleveland Browns	Henry Sheppard	T	SMU	
5	131	San Diego Chargers	Woodrow Lowe	LB	Alabama	from New England
5	132	Green Bay Packers	Aundra Thompson	RB	East Texas State	
5	133	Minnesota Vikings	Steve Wagner	S	Wisconsin	from Atlanta
5	134	Baltimore Colts	Sanders Shiver	LB	Carson-Newman	from Chicago via Miami through Chicago
5	135	Philadelphia Eagles	Greg Johnson	DT	Florida State	
5	136	New York Giants	Melvin Wilson	DB	Cal State Northridge	
5	137	Kansas City Chiefs	Willie Lee	DT	Bethune-Cookman	
5	138	Cincinnati Bengals	Willie Shelby	RB	Alabama	from San Francisco
5	139	Denver Broncos	Lonnie Perrin	RB	Illinois	
5	140	San Francisco 49ers	Tony Leonard	CB	Virginia Union	from Detroit
5	141	St. Louis Cardinals	Wayne Morris	RB	SMU	from Washington
5	142	Buffalo Bills	Fred Coleman	TE	Northeast Louisiana	
5	143	Baltimore Colts	Mike Kirkland	QB	Arkansas	
5	144	Kansas City Chiefs	Jimbo Elrod	LB	Oklahoma	from Houston
5	145	Detroit Lions	Steadman Scavella	LB	Miami (FL)	from Miami
5	146	Oakland Raiders	Fred Steinfort	K	Boston College	
5	147	Cincinnati Bengals	Scott Perry	CB	Williams	
5	148	Washington Redskins	Mike Hughes	G	Baylor	from St. Louis
5	149	Minnesota Vikings	Keith Barnette	RB	Boston College	
5	150	Los Angeles Rams	Ken Bordelon	DE	LSU	
5	151	Dallas Cowboys	Wally Pesuit	T	Kentucky	
5	152	Pittsburgh Steelers	Rodney Norton	LB	Rice	
5	153	Seattle Seahawks	Ernie Jones	CB	Miami (FL)	
5	154	Tampa Bay Buccaneers	Steve Wilson	T	Georgia	
5	155	Los Angeles Rams	Dwight Scales	WR	Grambling State	from Tampa Bay
5	156	Seattle Seahawks	Larry Bates	RB	Miami (FL)	
6	157	Seattle Seahawks	Alvis Darby	TE	Florida	
6	158	Tampa Bay Buccaneers	Curtis Jordan	S	Texas Tech	
6	159	Pittsburgh Steelers	Gary Dunn	DT	Miami (FL)	from San Diego via S. Louis
6	160	New Orleans Saints	Terry Stieve	G	Wisconsin	
6	161	Chicago Bears	Dan Jiggetts	T	Harvard	from Cleveland
6	162	New York Giants	Dan Lloyd	LB	Washington	from New England
6	163	New York Jets	Bob Martin	LB	Nebraska	
6	164	Buffalo Bills	Leslie Benson	DE	Baylor	from Atlanta
6	165	Philadelphia Eagles	Kirk Johnson	T	Howard Payne	
6	166	Kansas City Chiefs	Steve Taylor	SS	Kansas	from Green Bay via Houston
6	167	Kansas City Chiefs	Bob Gregolunas	LB	Northern Illinois	
6	168	San Francisco 49ers	Robert Pennywell	LB	Grambling State	
6	169	Atlanta Falcons	Stan Varner	DT	BYU	from Denver
6	170	New England Patriots	Greg Boyd	DE	San Diego State	
6	171	Buffalo Bills	Scott Piper	WR	Arizona	
6	172	Kansas City Chiefs	Calvin Harper	T	Illinois State	from Washington
6	173	Houston Oilers	Todd Simonsen	T	South Dakota State	
6	174	Miami Dolphins	Gary Davis	RB	Cal Poly	
6	175	Buffalo Bills	Darnell Powell	RB	Chattanooga	
6	176	Cincinnati Bengals	Orlando Nelson	TE	Utah State	
6	177	San Francisco 49ers	Scott Bull	QB	Arkansas	from St. Louis
6	178	San Diego Chargers	Calvin Lane	DB	Fresno State	from Oakland
6	179	Washington Redskins	Tom Marvaso	S	Cincinnati	from Los Angeles
6	180	Minnesota Vikings	Terry Egerdahl	DB	Minnesota-Duluth	
6	181	Dallas Cowboys	Greg McGuire	T	Indiana	
6	182	Pittsburgh Steelers	Jack Deloplaine	RB	Salem	
7	183	Tampa Bay Buccaneers	Parnell Dickinson	QB	Mississippi Valley State	
7	184	Seattle Seahawks	Dick Dixon	DT	Arkansas State	
7	185	Miami Dolphins	Joe Ingersoll	G	UNLV	from New Orleans
7	186	Dallas Cowboys	Greg Schaum	DT	Michigan State	from San Diego
7	187	Cincinnati Bengals	Bob Bateman	QB	Brown	from New England
7	188	New York Jets	Abdul Salaam	DE	Kent State	
7	189	Cleveland Browns	Steve Cassidy	DT	LSU	
7	190	Chicago Bears	Jerry Muckensturm	LB	Arkansas State	
7	191	Philadelphia Eagles	Carl Hairston	DE	Maryland Eastern Shore	
7	192	Cincinnati Bengals	Carmen Rome	DB	Miami (OH)	from Green Bay
7	193	Atlanta Falcons	Karl Farmer	WR	Pittsburgh	
7	194	San Francisco 49ers	Jay Chesley	DB	Vanderbilt	
7	195	Buffalo Bills	Jackie Williams	DB	Texas A&M	from N. Y. Giants
7	196	Kansas City Chiefs	Rod Wellington	RB	Iowa	
7	197	Houston Oilers	Larry Harris	DT	Oklahoma State	from Denver
7	198	Detroit Lions	Garth TenNapel	LB	Texas A&M	
7	199	New York Jets	James Richards	RB	Florida	from Buffalo
7	200	Miami Dolphins	James Owens	DE	Tennessee State	
7	201	New Orleans Saints	Ed Bauer	G	Notre Dame	from Baltimore via Chicago through Oakland
7	202	New England Patriots	Perry Brooks	DT	Southern	from Houston
7	203	St. Louis Cardinals	Phil Rogers	RB	Virginia Tech	
7	204	Oakland Raiders	Clarence Chapman	WR	Eastern Michigan	
7	205	Cincinnati Bengals	Ken Kuhn	LB	Ohio State	
7	206	Minnesota Vikings	Larry Brune	DB	Rice	
7	207	Los Angeles Rams	Larry Buie	DB	Mississippi State	
7	208	Dallas Cowboys	Dave Williams	RB	Colorado	
7	209	Pittsburgh Steelers	Barry Burton	TE	Vanderbilt	
8	210	Seattle Seahawks	Larry Shipp	WR	LSU	
8	211	New York Jets	Joe Davis	G	USC	from Tampa Bay
8	212	San Diego Chargers	Tony DiRienzo	K	Oklahoma	
8	213	New Orleans Saints	Craig Cassady	CB	Ohio State	
8	214	New York Jets	Louie Giammona	RB	Utah State	
8	215	Buffalo Bills	Scott Gardner	QB	Virginia	from Cleveland
8	216	Philadelphia Eagles	Richard LaFargue	C	Arkansas	from New England
8	217	Detroit Lions	Rich Sorenson	K	Chico State	from Philadelphia via New England
8	218	Green Bay Packers	Jim Burrow	S	Nebraska	
8	219	Atlanta Falcons	Frank Reed	CB	Washington	
8	220	Oakland Raiders	Jerome Dove	CB	Colorado State	from Chicago via San Diego
8	221	New York Giants	John Jordan	DT	Indiana	
8	222	Kansas City Chiefs	Orrin Olsen	C	BYU	
8	223	San Francisco 49ers	John Ayers	T	West Texas State	
8	224	Denver Broncos	James Betterson	RB	North Carolina	
8	225	Detroit Lions	Charles Braswell	DB	West Virginia	
8	226	Buffalo Bills	Bobby Joe Easter	RB	Middle Tennessee	
8	227	Buffalo Bills	Art Meadowcroft	G	Minnesota	from Washington via Atlanta
8	228	Baltimore Colts	Ricky Thompson	WR	Baylor	
8	229	Houston Oilers	Bobby Simon	T	Grambling State	
8	230	Miami Dolphins	Bob Simpson	T	Colorado	
8	231	Oakland Raiders	Terry Kunz	RB	Colorado	
8	232	Cincinnati Bengals	Ron Hart	T	Oregon	
8	233	St. Louis Cardinals	Randall Burks	WR	Southeastern Oklahoma State	
8	234	Washington Redskins	Brian Fryer	WR	Alberta	from Los Angeles
8	235	New England Patriots	Stu Betts	RB	Northern Michigan	from Minnesota
8	236	Dallas Cowboys	Henry Laws	DB	South Carolina	
8	237	Pittsburgh Steelers	Ed McAleney	DT	UMass	
9	238	Tampa Bay Buccaneers	Bruce Welch	G	Texas A&M	
9	239	Seattle Seahawks	Bob Bos	T	Iowa State	
9	240	New Orleans Saints	Warren Peiffer	DT	Iowa	
9	241	Buffalo Bills	Jeff Turner	LB	Kansas	from San Diego
9	242	Cleveland Browns	James Reed	RB	Ole Miss	
9	243	New England Patriots	Doug Beaudoin	S	Minnesota	
9	244	New York Jets	Ronnie Moore	WR	VMI	
9	245	Green Bay Packers	Jim Gueno	LB	Tulane	
9	246	Atlanta Falcons	Phil McKinnely	T	UCLA	
9	247	Philadelphia Eagles	Mike Hogan	RB	Tennessee-Chattanooga	from Chicago
9	248	Philadelphia Eagles	Richard Osborne	TE	Texas A&M	
9	249	Kansas City Chiefs	Tim Collier	CB	East Texas State	
9	250	San Francisco 49ers	Ken Harrison	WR	SMU	
9	251	San Diego Chargers	Glynn Harrison	RB	Georgia	from N. Y. Giants
9	252	Denver Broncos	Jim Czirr	C	Michigan	
9	253	Detroit Lions	Leanell Jones	TE	Long Beach State	
9	254	Washington Redskins	Curtis Akins	G	Hawaii	
9	255	Buffalo Bills	Bob Kotzur	DT	Southwest Texas State	
9	256	Houston Oilers	Art Stringer	LB	Ball State	
9	257	Miami Dolphins	Norris Thomas	CB	Southern Miss	
9	258	Baltimore Colts	Stu Levenick	T	Illinois	
9	259	Cincinnati Bengals	Lonnie Allgood	WR	Syracuse	
9	260	Denver Broncos	Jim Lisko	LB	Arkansas State	from St. Louis
9	261	Cleveland Browns	Craig Nagel	QB	Purdue	from Oakland
9	262	Minnesota Vikings	Isaac Hagins	WR	Southern	
9	263	Los Angeles Rams	Jeb Church	DB	Stanford	
9	264	Dallas Cowboys	Beasley Reece	CB	North Texas State	
9	265	Pittsburgh Steelers	Wentford Gaines	CB	Cincinnati	
10	266	Seattle Seahawks	Randy Coffield	LB	Florida State	
10	267	Tampa Bay Buccaneers	Sid Smith	LB	BYU	
10	268	San Diego Chargers	Jeff Perlinger	DE	Michigan	
10	269	New Orleans Saints	Junior Hardin	LB	Eastern Kentucky	
10	270	New England Patriots	Ricky Feacher	WR	Mississippi Valley State	
10	271	Cleveland Browns	Doug Kleber	T	Illinois	
10	272	Washington Redskins	Paul Strohmeier	LB	Washington	
10	273	Philadelphia Eagles	Herb Lusk	RB	Long Beach State	
10	274	Green Bay Packers	Jessie Green	WR	Tulsa	
10	275	San Francisco 49ers	Robin Ross	T	Washington State	
10	276	New York Giants	John Thomas	RB	Valley City State	
10	277	Kansas City Chiefs	Whitney Paul	DE	Colorado	
10	278	Denver Broncos	Art Gilliam	DE	Grambling	
10	279	Detroit Lions	Bill Bowerman	DB	New Mexico State	
10	280	Buffalo Bills	Keith Moody	DB	Syracuse	
10	281	Miami Dolphins	Gary Fencik ^{†}	S	Yale	
10	282	Miami Dolphins	Don Testerman	RB	Clemson	
10	283	Baltimore Colts	Tim Baylor	DB	Morgan State	
10	284	Houston Oilers	Steve Kincannon	QB	Humboldt State	
10	285	St. Louis Cardinals	Randy Walker	RB	Bethune–Cookman	
10	286	Oakland Raiders	Dwight Lewis	DB	Purdue	
10	287	Cincinnati Bengals	Tom Klaban	K	Ohio State	
10	288	Los Angeles Rams	Freeman Johns	WR	SMU	
10	289	Minnesota Vikings	Bill Salmon	QB	Northern Iowa	
10	290	Dallas Cowboys	Leroy Cook	DE	Alabama	
10	291	Pittsburgh Steelers	Gary Campbell	LB	Colorado	
11	292	Tampa Bay Buccaneers	Melvin Washington	DB	Colorado State	
11	293	Seattle Seahawks	Keith Muehr	P	Southwestern Louisiana	
11	294	New Orleans Saints	Greg Kokal	QB	Kent State	
11	295	San Diego Chargers	Ray Preston	LB	Syracuse	
11	296	New York Jets	Lawrence Pillers	DE	Alcorn State	
11	297	Cleveland Browns	Chuck Celek	DE	Kent State	
11	298	New England Patriots	Donnie Thomas	LB	Indiana	
11	299	Chicago Bears	Norman Andersen	WR	UCLA	
11	300	Philadelphia Eagles	Mike Gilbert	DT	San Diego State	
11	301	Green Bay Packers	Curtis Leak	WR	Johnson C. Smith	
11	302	Atlanta Falcons	Chuck Brislin	T	Mississippi State	
11	303	New York Giants	Craig Brantley	WR	Clemson	
11	304	Kansas City Chiefs	Bob Squires	TE	Hastings	
11	305	San Francisco 49ers	Paul Hofer	RB	Ole Miss	
11	306	Denver Broncos	Greg Pittman	LB	Iowa State	
11	307	Detroit Lions	Gary Shugrue	DE	Villanova	
11	308	Washington Redskins	Dean Gissler	DE	Nebraska	
11	309	Buffalo Bills	Forry Smith	WR	Iowa State	
11	310	Baltimore Colts	Rick Gibney	DT	Georgia Tech	
11	311	Houston Oilers	Skip Walker	RB	Texas A&M	
11	312	Miami Dolphins	Dexter Pride	RB	Minnesota	
11	313	Oakland Raiders	Rick Jennings	RB	Maryland	
11	314	Cincinnati Bengals	Melvin Morgan	DB	Mississippi Valley State	
11	315	St. Louis Cardinals	Marty Akins	DB	Texas	
11	316	Minnesota Vikings	Steve Kracher	RB	Montana State	
11	317	Los Angeles Rams	Brian Nemeth	TE	South Carolina	
11	318	Dallas Cowboys	Cornelius Greene	QB	Ohio State	
11	319	Pittsburgh Steelers	Rolland Fuchs	RB	Arkansas	
12	320	Seattle Seahawks	Ron Barnett	WR	Texas–Arlington	
12	321	Tampa Bay Buccaneers	George Ragsdale	RB	North Carolina A&T	
12	322	San Diego Chargers	Ron Lee	DB	Oregon	
12	323	New Orleans Saints	Milton Butts	T	North Carolina	
12	324	Houston Oilers	Larry Bell	T	East Texas State	
12	325	New England Patriots	Nathaniel Bell	DT	Tulane	
12	326	New York Jets	Don Buckey	WR	NC State	
12	327	New York Jets	Dave Buckey	QB	NC State	
12	328	Green Bay Packers	Melvin Jackson	G	USC	
12	329	Atlanta Falcons	Pat Bolton	K	Montana State	
12	330	Chicago Bears	John O'Leary	RB	Nebraska	
12	331	Kansas City Chiefs	Harold Porter	WR	Southwestern Louisiana	
12	332	San Francisco 49ers	Gerald Loper	G	Florida	
12	333	New York Giants	Jerry Golsteyn	QB	Northern Illinois	
12	334	Denver Broncos	Randy Moore	DT	Arizona State	
12	335	Detroit Lions	Mike McCabe	C	South Carolina	
12	336	Buffalo Bills	Joe Lowery	RB	Jackson State	
12	337	Washington Redskins	Walter Tullis	DB	Delaware State	
12	338	San Diego Chargers	Herman Harris	DB	Mississippi Valley State	
12	339	Miami Dolphins	Randy Young	T	Iowa State	
12	340	Baltimore Colts	Frank Stavroff	K	Indiana	
12	341	Cincinnati Bengals	Joe Dale Harris	WR	Alabama	
12	342	Miami Dolphins	Darryl Brandford	DT	Northwestern	
12	343	Oakland Raiders	Cedric Brown	DB	Kent State	
12	344	Los Angeles Rams	Jim Jodat	RB	Carthage	
12	345	Minnesota Vikings	Robert Sparks	DB	San Francisco State	
12	346	Dallas Cowboys	Charles McShane	LB	Cal Lutheran	
12	347	Pittsburgh Steelers	Bill Carroll	WR	East Texas State	
13	348	Tampa Bay Buccaneers	Brad Jenkins	TE	Nebraska	
13	349	Seattle Seahawks	Andy Reid	RB	Georgia	
13	350	New Orleans Saints	Kenny Downing	DB	Missouri	
13	351	San Diego Chargers	John Lee	DT	Nebraska	
13	352	New England Patriots	James Jones	DB	Central Michigan	
13	353	Philadelphia Eagles	Terry Tautolo	LB	UCLA	
13	354	Cleveland Browns	Brian Murray	T	Arizona	
13	355	Green Bay Packers	Bradley Bowman	DB	Southern Miss	
13	356	Atlanta Falcons	Mike Williams	T	Florida	
13	357	Chicago Bears	Dale Kasowski	RB	North Dakota	
13	358	Philadelphia Eagles	Steve Ebbecke	DB	Villanova	
13	359	San Francisco 49ers	Larry Brumfield	DB	Indiana State	
13	360	New York Giants	Rick Caswell	WR	Western Kentucky	
13	361	Kansas City Chiefs	Joe Bruner	QB	Northeast Louisiana	
13	362	Denver Broncos	Donnie McGraw	DB	Houston	
13	363	Detroit Lions	Mel Jacobs	WR	San Diego State	
13	364	Washington Redskins	Wayman Britt	DB	Michigan	
13	365	Buffalo Bills	Will Wilcox	G	Texas	
13	366	Miami Dolphins	Bernie Head	C	Tulsa	
13	367	Oakland Raiders	Craig Crnick	DE	Idaho	
13	368	Houston Oilers	Dan O'Rourke	WR	Colorado State	
13	369	St. Louis Cardinals	Greg Brewton	DT	Michigan State	
13	370	Oakland Raiders	Mark Young	T	Washington State	
13	371	Cincinnati Bengals	Randy Walker	DB	Miami (OH)	
13	372	Minnesota Vikings	Gary Paulson	DE	Colorado State	
13	373	Los Angeles Rams	Steve Hamilton	QB	Emporia State	
13	374	Dallas Cowboys	Mark Driscoll	QB	Colorado State	
13	375	Pittsburgh Steelers	Larry Kain	TE	Ohio State	
14	376	Seattle Seahawks	Jarvis Blinks	DB	Northwestern State	
14	377	Tampa Bay Buccaneers	Carl Roaches ^{†}	WR	Texas A&M	
14	378	San Diego Chargers	Ed Jones	G	Cincinnati	
14	379	New Orleans Saints	Rich Hucke	DE	Western Montana	
14	380	New York Jets	Al Gluchoski	C	West Virginia	
14	381	Cleveland Browns	Joe Smalzer	TE	Illinois	
14	382	New England Patriots	David Quehl	WR	Holy Cross	
14	383	Atlanta Falcons	Mark Husfloen	DE	Washington State	
14	384	Chicago Bears	Ron Cuie	RB	Oregon State	
14	385	Chicago Bears	Melvin Shy	DB	Tennessee State	
14	386	Green Bay Packers	John Henson	RB	Cal Poly	
14	387	New York Giants	Jerry Mullane	LB	Lehigh	
14	388	Kansas City Chiefs	Rick Thurman	T	Texas	
14	389	San Francisco 49ers	Johnny Miller	LB	Livingstone	
14	390	Denver Broncos	Larry Evans	LB	Mississippi College	
14	391	Detroit Lions	Leonard Elston	WR	Kentucky State	
14	392	Buffalo Bills	Tony Williams	WR	Middle Tennessee	
14	393	Washington Redskins	Quinn Buckner	DB	Indiana	
14	394	Baltimore Colts	Jeremiah Cummings	DE	Albany State	
14	395	Houston Oilers	John Reimer	T	Wisconsin	
14	396	Miami Dolphins	Bob Gissler	LB	South Dakota State	
14	397	Oakland Raiders	Calvin Young	RB	Fresno State	
14	398	Cincinnati Bengals	Greg Coleman	P	Florida A&M	
14	399	St. Louis Cardinals	Raymond Crosier	DE	Abilene Christian	
14	400	Los Angeles Rams	Al Burleson	DB	Washington	
14	401	Minnesota Vikings	Jeff Stapleton	T	Purdue	
14	402	Dallas Cowboys	Larry Mushinskie	TE	Nebraska	
14	403	Pittsburgh Steelers	Wayne Field	DB	Florida	

=== Round 15 ===
Pick #	NFL team	Player	Position	College
404	Tampa Bay Buccaneers	Bob Dzierzak	Defensive tackle	Utah State
405	Seattle Seahawks	Dan Smith	Tackle	Washington State
406	New Orleans Saints	Steve Seminoff	Defensive tackle	Wichita State
407	San Diego Chargers	Jack Hoffman	Defensive tackle	Indiana
408	Cleveland Browns	Luther Philyaw	Defensive back	Loyola (CA)
409	New England Patriots	Bernard Coleman	Wide receiver	Bethune-Cookman
410	New York Jets	Rick Faulk	Punter	San Francisco State
411	Chicago Bears	Jerry Meyers	Defensive tackle	Northern Illinois
412	Philadelphia Eagles	Brett White	Punter	UCLA
413	Green Bay Packers	Jerry Dandridge	Linebacker	Memphis State
414	Atlanta Falcons	Ron Olson	Defensive back	Washington
415	Kansas City Chiefs	Dave Rozumek	Linebacker	New Hampshire
416	San Francisco 49ers	Howard Stidham	Linebacker	Tennessee Tech
417	New York Giants	Eddie Morgan	Defensive tackle	Arkansas State
418	Denver Broncos	Wilbur Summers	Punter	Louisville
419	Detroit Lions	Trent Smock	Wide receiver	Indiana
420	St. Louis Cardinals	Lee Nelson	Defensive back	Florida State
421	Buffalo Bills	Arnold Robinson	Linebacker	Bethune-Cookman
422	Houston Oilers	Bobby Byars	Defensive back	Cheyney (PA)
423	Miami Dolphins	Ron Holmes	Running back	Utah State
424	Baltimore Colts	Gary Alexander	Tackle	Clemson
425	Cincinnati Bengals	Lynn Hieber	Quarterback	Indiana (PA)
426	Washington Redskins	John Monroe	Running back	Bluefield State
427	Oakland Raiders	Carl Hargrave	Defensive back	Upper Iowa
428	Minnesota Vikings	Ron Groce	Running back	Macalester
429	Los Angeles Rams	Malcolm Campbell	Wide receiver	Cal State-Los Angeles
430	Dallas Cowboys	Dale Curry	Linebacker	UCLA
431	Pittsburgh Steelers	Mel Davis	Defensive end	North Texas State

=== Round 16 ===
Pick #	NFL team	Player	Position	College
432	Seattle Seahawks	Jeff Urczyk	Guard	Georgia Tech
433	Tampa Bay Buccaneers	Tommy West	Linebacker	Tennessee
434	San Diego Chargers	Jack Harrison	Guard	California
435	New Orleans Saints	Gene Jones	Tackle	Bowling Green
436	New England Patriots	Clifford Brown	Defensive tackle	Tuskegee
437	New York Jets	James Godwin	Running back	Fayetteville
438	Cleveland Browns	Chris Lorenzen	Defensive tackle	Arizona State
439	Philadelphia Eagles	Steve Campassi	Running back	Kentucky
440	Green Bay Packers	Mike Timmermans	Guard	Northern Iowa
441	Atlanta Falcons	Pat Curto	Linebacker	Ohio State
442	Chicago Bears	Ronald Parker	Tight end	Texas Christian
443	San Francisco 49ers	Reggie Lewis	Defensive end	San Diego State
444	New York Giants	David Lawson	Kicker	Air Force
445	Kansas City Chiefs	Dennis Anderson	Punter	Arizona
446	Denver Broncos	John Huddleston	Linebacker	Utah
447	Detroit Lions	Craig McCurdy	Linebacker	William & Mary
448	Buffalo Bills	Gary Gorrell	Linebacker	Boise State
449	Baltimore Colts	Mike Fuhrman	Tight end	Memphis State
450	Miami Dolphins	Mike Green	Punter	Ohio
451	Baltimore Colts	Steve Ludwig	Center	Miami (FL)
452	Houston Oilers	Claude Johnson	Linebacker	Florida A&M
453	St. Louis Cardinals	Cecil Beaird	Wide receiver	Fisk
454	Oakland Raiders	Doug Hogan	Defensive back	USC
455	Cincinnati Bengals	George Demopoulis	Tackle	Miami (FL)
456	Los Angeles Rams	Rick Gage	Wide receiver	Arkansas Tech
457	Minnesota Vikings	Randy Hickel	Defensive back	Montana State
458	Dallas Cowboys	Rick Costanzo	Tackle	Nebraska
459	Pittsburgh Steelers	Randy Butts	Running back	Kearney State

=== Round 17 ===
Pick #	NFL team	Player	Position	College
460	Tampa Bay Buccaneers	Jack Berry	Quarterback	Washington & Lee
461	Seattle Seahawks	Chris Rowland	Quarterback	Washington
462	New Orleans Saints	Scott MacDonald	Tight end	West Virginia
463	San Diego Chargers	Clarence Sanders	Linebacker	Cincinnati
464	New York Jets	Darwin Willie	Tight end	Tulane
465	Cleveland Browns	Tom Fleming	Wide receiver	Dartmouth
466	New England Patriots	Todd Anderson	Center	Stanford
467	Green Bay Packers	Ray Hall	Tight end	Cal Poly-San Luis Obispo
468	Atlanta Falcons	Tony Green	Defensive back	Texas Tech
469	Chicago Bears	Mike Malham	Linebacker	Arkansas State
470	Philadelphia Eagles	Anthony Terry	Defensive back	California-Davis
471	New York Giants	Steve Curnutte	Defensive back	Vanderbilt
472	Kansas City Chiefs	Pat McNeil	Running back	Baylor
473	San Francisco 49ers	Darryl Jenkins	Running back	San Jose State
474	Denver Broncos	Randy Cozens	Defensive end	Pittsburgh
475	Detroit Lions	Jim Meeks	Defensive back	Boise State
476	Washington Redskins	Chuck Wills	Defensive back	Oregon
477	Buffalo Bills	Bob Berg	Kicker	New Mexico
478	Oakland Raiders	Buddy Tate	Defensive back	Tulsa
479	Houston Oilers	Allen Misher	Wide receiver	Louisiana State
480	Miami Dolphins	Jeff Grantz	Quarterback	South Carolina
481	Oakland Raiders	Nate Beasley	Running back	Delaware
482	Cincinnati Bengals	Scott Dannelley	Guard	Ohio State
483	St. Louis Cardinals	Dan Myers	Defensive back	Georgia Tech
484	Minnesota Vikings	Rich Lukowski	Defensive tackle	West Virginia
485	Los Angeles Rams	Gary Shaw	Defensive back	Brigham Young
486	Dallas Cowboys	Stan Woodfill	Kicker	Oregon
487	Pittsburgh Steelers	Kelvin Kirk	Wide receiver	Dayton

= Pro Bowler	= Hall of Famer

== Notable undrafted players ==
^{†}	= Pro Bowler

Original NFL team	Player	Pos.	College	Notes
Atlanta Falcons	Mark Burke	S	West Virginia	
Buffalo Bills	Bob Patton	C	Delaware	
Chicago Bears	Vernon Perry	S	Jackson State	
Cincinnati Bengals	M. L. Harris	TE	Kansas State	
Cleveland Browns	Terry Luck	QB	Nebraska	
Dallas Cowboys	Hank Bauer	RB	Cal Lutheran	
Dallas Cowboys	Tom Moriarty	S	Bowling Green	
Dallas Cowboys	Jay Saldi	TE	South Carolina	
Denver Broncos	Randy Rich	N/A	New Mexico	
Denver Broncos	John Schultz	WR	Maryland	
Green Bay Packers	Ken Starch	RB	Wisconsin	
New Orleans Saints	Ken Brown	C	New Mexico	
New York Jets	Clark Gaines	RB	Wake Forest	
New York Jets	James Rosecrans	LB	Penn State	
Pittsburgh Steelers	Freddie Douglas	WR	Arkansas	
St. Louis Cardinals	Terry Joyce	TE/P	Missouri Southern State	
San Diego Chargers	Charles Aiu	G	Hawaii	

== Hall of Famers ==
- Steve Largent, wide receiver from Tulsa, taken 4th round 117th overall by Houston Oilers

Inducted: Professional Football Hall of Fame class of 1995.

- Lee Roy Selmon, defensive end from Oklahoma, taken 1st round 1st overall by Tampa Bay Buccaneers

Inducted: Professional Football Hall of Fame class of 1995.

- Mike Haynes, cornerback from Arizona State, taken 1st round 5th overall by New England Patriots

Inducted: Professional Football Hall of Fame class of 1997.

- Jackie Slater, offensive tackle from Jackson State, taken 3rd round 86th overall by Los Angeles Rams

Inducted: Professional Football Hall of Fame class of 2001.

- Harry Carson, linebacker from South Carolina State, taken 4th round 105th overall by New York Giants

Inducted: Professional Football Hall of Fame class of 2006.
