= 1975 Illinois State Redbirds football team =

American college football season

1975 Illinois State Redbirds football
- Conference: Independent
- Record: 2–7–1
- Head coach: Gerry Hart (4th season)
- Home stadium: Hancock Stadium

1975 NCAA Division II independents football records
	Conf.			Overall
Team	W	L	T	W		L		T
No. 2 Northern Michigan ^		–		13	–	1	–	0
American International		–		8	–	1	–	0
Lehigh ^		–		9	–	3	–	0
Delaware		–		8	–	3	–	0
Portland State		–		8	–	3	–	0
Akron		–		7	–	4	–	0
Kentucky State		–		7	–	4	–	0
UNLV		–		7	–	4	–	0
Santa Clara		–		6	–	5	–	0
Tennessee State		–		5	–	4	–	0
Youngstown State		–		5	–	4	–	0
Chattanooga		–		5	–	5	–	1
Bucknell		–		5	–	5	–	0
Indiana State		–		5	–	5	–	0
Lafayette		–		5	–	5	–	0
Southern Connecticut State		–		5	–	5	–	0
Central Connecticut		–		4	–	5	–	0
Central State (OH)		–		4	–	6	–	0
Eastern Michigan		–		4	–	6	–	0
Eastern Illinois		–		3	–	5	–	2
Illinois College		–		3	–	6	–	0
Northeastern		–		3	–	6	–	0
Western Carolina		–		3	–	7	–	0
Nevada		–		3	–	8	–	0
Nebraska–Omaha		–		2	–	9	–	0
Arkansas–Pine Bluff		–		0	–	11	–	0
^ – NCAA Division II playoff participant; Rankings from AP Poll

The 1975 Illinois State Redbirds football team represented Illinois State University as an independent during the 1975 NCAA Division II football season. In their fourth season under head coach Gerry Hart, the Redbirds compiled a 2–7–1 record.

== Schedule ==
Date	Opponent	Site	Result	Attendance	Source
September 13	Western Illinois	Hancock Stadium; Normal, IL	L 7–17	12,500	
September 20	at Western Kentucky	L. T. Smith Stadium; Bowling Green, KY	L 14–24	15,300	
September 27	at Marshall	Fairfield Stadium; Huntington, WV	L 3–36	9,853	
October 4	Central Michigan	Hancock Stadium; Normal, IL	L 7–42	7,000	
October 11	Southern Illinois	Hancock Stadium; Normal, IL	T 17–17	14,000	
October 25	at Indiana State	Memorial Stadium; Terre Haute, IN	L 13–42	16,684	
November 1	Northern Illinois	Hancock Stadium; Normal, IL	W 27–10	7,500	
November 8	at Eastern Michigan	Rynearson Stadium; Ypsilanti, MI	L 14–51	4,500	
November 15	at Ball State	Ball State Stadium; Muncie, IN	L 7–46	9,850	
November 22	at Eastern Illinois	O'Brien Stadium; Charleston, IL (rivalry)	W 31–13	2,500	
