= 1975 Western Michigan Broncos football team =

American college football season

1975 Western Michigan Broncos football
- Conference: Mid-American Conference
- Record: 1–10 (0–7 MAC)
- Head coach: Elliot Uzelac (1st season)
- MVP: Dan Matthews
- Captains: Duncan McKerracher; Jim White
- Home stadium: Waldo Stadium

1975 Mid-American Conference football standings
	Conf.					Overall
Team	W		L		T	W		L		T
No. 12 Miami (OH) $	6	–	0	–	0	11	–	1	–	0
Central Michigan	4	–	1	–	1	8	–	2	–	1
Ball State	4	–	2	–	0	9	–	2	–	0
Bowling Green	4	–	2	–	0	8	–	3	–	0
Ohio	3	–	3	–	1	5	–	5	–	1
Toledo	4	–	4	–	0	5	–	6	–	0
Northern Illinois	2	–	3	–	0	3	–	8	–	0
Kent State	1	–	6	–	0	4	–	7	–	0
Western Michigan	0	–	7	–	0	1	–	10	–	0
$ – Conference champion; Rankings from AP Poll

The 1975 Western Michigan Broncos football team represented Western Michigan University in the Mid-American Conference (MAC) during the 1975 NCAA Division I football season. In their first season under head coach Elliot Uzelac, the Broncos compiled a 1-10 record (0/7 against MAC opponents), finished in ninth place in the MAC, and were outscored by their opponents, 297 to 119. The team played its home games at Waldo Stadium in Kalamazoo, Michigan.

The team's statistical leaders included Sollie Boone with 318 passing yards, Dan Matthews with 873 rushing yards, and Ted Forrest with 286 receiving yards. Linebacker Duncan McKerracher and fullback/middle guard Jim White were the team captains. For the second consecutive year, fullback Dan Matthews received the team's most outstanding player award.

Uzelac was hired as Western Michigan's head football coach in December 1974. Uzelac was 33 years old at the time of his hiring. He was a Western Michigan alumnus, having graduated in 1964. He had served previously as an assistant coach for the Michigan Wolverines and Detroit Lions.

== Schedule ==
Date	Opponent	Site	Result	Attendance	Source
September 6	at Central Michigan	Perry Shorts Stadium; Mount Pleasant, MI (rivalry)	L 0–34	20,800	
September 13	Akron*	Waldo Stadium; Kalamazoo, MI	L 21–27	14,200	
September 20	at Minnesota*	Memorial Stadium; Minneapolis, MN	L 0–38	23,326	
September 27	Northern Illinois	Waldo Stadium; Kalamazoo, MI	L 0–20	15,200	
October 4	at Bowling Green	Doyt Perry Stadium; Bowling Green, OH	L 0–28	13,090	
October 11	Kent State	Waldo Stadium; Kalamazoo, MI	L 17–22		
October 18	vs. Toledo	Cleveland Stadium; Cleveland, OH	L 7–25	2,000	
October 25	at Marshall*	Fairfield Stadium; Huntington, WV	L 19–21	11,980	
November 1	at Ohio	Peden Stadium; Athens, OH	L 10–24	15,000	
November 8	No. 17 Miami (OH)	Waldo Stadium; Kalamazoo, MI	L 21–44		
November 15	Eastern Michigan*	Waldo Stadium; Kalamazoo, MI	W 24–10	9,400	
*Non-conference game; Rankings from AP Poll released prior to the game
