= 1975 Northern Illinois Huskies football team =

American college football season

1975 Northern Illinois Huskies football
- Conference: Mid-American Conference
- Record: 3–8 (2–3 MAC)
- Head coach: Jerry Ippoliti (5th season)
- Offensive coordinator: Jack Dean (1st season)
- MVPs: Jerry Golsteyn; Bob Gregolunas
- Captains: Jerry Golsteyn; Tim Peters; Jerry Meyers; Bob Gregolunas
- Home stadium: Huskie Stadium

1975 Mid-American Conference football standings
	Conf.					Overall
Team	W		L		T	W		L		T
No. 12 Miami (OH) $	6	–	0	–	0	11	–	1	–	0
Central Michigan	4	–	1	–	1	8	–	2	–	1
Ball State	4	–	2	–	0	9	–	2	–	0
Bowling Green	4	–	2	–	0	8	–	3	–	0
Ohio	3	–	3	–	1	5	–	5	–	1
Toledo	4	–	4	–	0	5	–	6	–	0
Northern Illinois	2	–	3	–	0	3	–	8	–	0
Kent State	1	–	6	–	0	4	–	7	–	0
Western Michigan	0	–	7	–	0	1	–	10	–	0
$ – Conference champion; Rankings from AP Poll

The 1975 Northern Illinois Huskies football team represented Northern Illinois University as a member of the Mid-American Conference (MAC) during 1975 NCAA Division I football season. Led by Jerry Ippoliti in his fifth and final season as head coach, the Huskies compiled an overall record of 3–8 with a mark of 2–3 in conference play, placing seventh in the MAC. Northern Illinois played home games at Huskie Stadium in DeKalb, Illinois. This was their last year as an independent team, as they moved to the Mid-American Conference the following season. 1975 was the first season in which the Huskies competed in the MAC.

== Schedule ==
Date	Opponent	Site	Result	Attendance	Source
September 13	Long Beach State*	Huskie Stadium; DeKalb, IL	L 7–24	9,440	
September 20	at Northwestern*	Dyche Stadium; Evanston, IL	L 3–10	21,700	
September 27	at Western Michigan	Waldo Stadium; Kalamazoo, MI	W 20–0	15,200	
October 4	Kent State	Huskie Stadium; DeKalb, IL	W 38–15		
October 11	at Indiana State*	Memorial Stadium; Terre Haute, IN	L 10–21	9,672	
October 18	Southern Illinois*	Huskie Stadium; DeKalb, IL	W 52–12	17,908	
October 25	Ball State	Huskie Stadium; DeKalb, IL (rivalry)	L 0–3		
November 1	at Illinois State*	Hancock Stadium; Normal, IL	L 10–27	7,500	
November 8	Toledo	Huskie Stadium; DeKalb, IL	L 22–24	5,788	
November 15	at Central Michigan	Perry Shorts Stadium; Mount Pleasant, MI	L 7–69	12,100	
November 22	at Idaho*	Kibbie Dome; Moscow, ID	L 24–25	7,345	
*Non-conference game
