= 1975 Eastern Michigan Hurons football team =

American college football season

1975 Eastern Michigan Hurons football
- Conference: Independent
- Record: 4–6
- Head coach: George Mans (2nd season)
- Defensive coordinator: Doug Graber (4th season)
- Captains: Ric Franz; Rod Luplow
- Home stadium: Rynearson Stadium

1975 NCAA Division II independents football records
	Conf.			Overall
Team	W	L	T	W		L		T
No. 2 Northern Michigan ^		–		13	–	1	–	0
American International		–		8	–	1	–	0
Lehigh ^		–		9	–	3	–	0
Delaware		–		8	–	3	–	0
Portland State		–		8	–	3	–	0
Akron		–		7	–	4	–	0
Kentucky State		–		7	–	4	–	0
UNLV		–		7	–	4	–	0
Santa Clara		–		6	–	5	–	0
Tennessee State		–		5	–	4	–	0
Youngstown State		–		5	–	4	–	0
Chattanooga		–		5	–	5	–	1
Bucknell		–		5	–	5	–	0
Indiana State		–		5	–	5	–	0
Lafayette		–		5	–	5	–	0
Southern Connecticut State		–		5	–	5	–	0
Central Connecticut		–		4	–	5	–	0
Central State (OH)		–		4	–	6	–	0
Eastern Michigan		–		4	–	6	–	0
Eastern Illinois		–		3	–	5	–	2
Illinois College		–		3	–	6	–	0
Northeastern		–		3	–	6	–	0
Western Carolina		–		3	–	7	–	0
Nevada		–		3	–	8	–	0
Illinois State		–		2	–	7	–	1
Nebraska–Omaha		–		2	–	9	–	0
Arkansas–Pine Bluff		–		0	–	11	–	0
^ – NCAA Division II playoff participant; Rankings from AP Poll

The 1975 Eastern Michigan Hurons football team represented Eastern Michigan University as an independent during the 1975 NCAA Division II football season. In their second and final season under head coach George Mans, the Hurons compiled a 4–6 record and outscored their opponents, 198 to 171. The team's statistical leaders included Jerry Mucha with 526 passing yards and Clarence Chapman with 634 rushing yards and 194 receiving yards.

In May 1976, coach Mans announced his resignation as the school's head football coach in what the Associated Press described as a "surprise move." According to one newspaper report, Mans resigned "when it became apparent that EMU would place a greater emphasis on basketball, hiring former Detroit Pistons coach Ray Scott." Mans compiled an 8–12–1 record in two seasons as the head football coach at Eastern Michigan.

== Schedule ==
Date	Opponent	Site	Result	Attendance	Source
September 6	at Ball State	Ball State Stadium; Muncie, IN	L 14–24	7,819	
September 13	Indiana State	Rynearson Stadium; Ypsilanti, MI	W 30–7	7,221	
September 20	at Northeast Louisiana	Brown Stadium; Monroe, LA	W 27–24	8,300	
September 27	McNeese State	Rynearson Stadium; Ypsilanti, MI	W 20–6	11,035	
October 11	at Central Michigan	Perry Shorts Stadium; Mount Pleasant, MI (rivalry)	L 7–20	21,100	
October 18	Northern Michigan ^{†}	Rynearson Stadium; Ypsilanti, MI	L 7–20	7,220	
October 25	Western Illinois	Rynearson Stadium; Ypsilanti, MI	L 14–17	6,221	
November 1	at Youngstown State	Rayen Stadium; Youngstown, OH	L 14–15	3,870	
November 8	Illinois State	Rynearson Stadium; Ypsilanti, MI	W 51–14	4,500	
November 15	at Western Michigan	Waldo Stadium; Kalamazoo, MI	L 14–24	9,400	
^{†}Homecoming

== After the season ==
The following Huron was selected in the 1976 NFL draft after the season.

Round	Pick	Player	Position	NFL club
7	204	Clarence Chapman	Wide receiver	Oakland Raiders
