= 1975 Marshall Thundering Herd football team =

American college football season

1975 Marshall Thundering Herd football
- Conference: Independent
- Record: 2–9
- Head coach: Frank Ellwood (1st season)
- Defensive coordinator: Carlin B. Carpenter (1st season)
- Captains: Mark Brookover; Steve Morton; Jesse Smith
- Home stadium: Fairfield Stadium

1975 NCAA Division I independents football records
	Conf.			Overall
Team	W	L	T	W		L		T
Rutgers		–		9	–	2	–	0
No. 10 Penn State		–		9	–	3	–	0
No. 20 West Virginia		–		9	–	3	–	0
Notre Dame		–		8	–	3	–	0
Virginia Tech		–		8	–	3	–	0
No. 15 Pittsburgh		–		8	–	4	–	0
Boston College		–		7	–	4	–	0
Georgia Tech		–		7	–	4	–	0
Memphis State		–		7	–	4	–	0
Navy		–		7	–	4	–	0
North Texas State		–		7	–	4	–	0
Southern Miss		–		7	–	4	–	0
South Carolina		–		7	–	5	–	0
Colgate		–		6	–	4	–	0
Cincinnati		–		6	–	5	–	0
Hawaii		–		6	–	5	–	0
Syracuse		–		6	–	5	–	0
Temple		–		6	–	5	–	0
Utah State		–		6	–	5	–	0
Dayton		–		5	–	6	–	0
Northeast Louisiana		–		4	–	6	–	1
Tulane		–		4	–	7	–	0
Villanova		–		4	–	7	–	0
Florida State		–		3	–	8	–	0
Air Force		–		2	–	8	–	1
Houston		–		2	–	8	–	0
Miami (FL)		–		2	–	8	–	0
Army		–		2	–	9	–	0
Marshall		–		2	–	9	–	0
Southern Illinois		–		1	–	9	–	1
Holy Cross		–		1	–	10	–	0
Louisville		–		1	–	10	–	0
Rankings from AP Poll

The 1975 Marshall Thundering Herd football team was an American football team that represented Marshall University as an independent during the 1975 NCAA Division I football season. In its first season under head coach Frank Ellwood, the team compiled a 2–9 record and was outscored by a total of 291 to 110. Mark Brookover, Steve Morton, and Jesse Smith were the team captains. The team played its home games at Fairfield Stadium in Huntington, West Virginia.

== Schedule ==
Date	Opponent	Site	Result	Attendance	Source
September 6	at Akron	Rubber Bowl; Akron, OH	L 8–20	27,949	
September 13	at Miami (OH)	Miami Field; Oxford, OH	L 0–50	8,109	
September 20	Morehead State	Fairfield Stadium; Huntington, WV	L 16–19	12,031	
September 27	Illinois State	Fairfield Stadium; Huntington, WV	W 36–3	9,853	
October 4	McNeese State	Fairfield Stadium; Huntington, WV	L 3–33	9,156	
October 18	at Villanova	Villanova Stadium; Villanova, PA	L 14–21	6,600	
October 25	Western Michigan^{†}	Fairfield Stadium; Huntington, WV	W 21–19	11,980	
November 1	at Central Michigan	Perry Shorts Stadium; Mount Pleasant, MI	L 0–34	14,600	
November 8	at Kent State	Dix Stadium; Kent, OH	L 21–30	6,164	
November 15	at Dayton	Welcome Stadium; Dayton, OH	L 8–29		
November 22	Ohio	Fairfield Stadium; Huntington, WV (rivalry)	L 21–38	7,234	
^{†}Homecoming
