= 1975 Ohio Bobcats football team =

American college football season

1975 Ohio Bobcats football
- Conference: Mid-American Conference
- Record: 5–5–1 (3–3–1 MAC)
- Head coach: Bill Hess (18th season)
- Home stadium: Peden Stadium

1975 Mid-American Conference football standings
	Conf.					Overall
Team	W		L		T	W		L		T
No. 12 Miami (OH) $	6	–	0	–	0	11	–	1	–	0
Central Michigan	4	–	1	–	1	8	–	2	–	1
Ball State	4	–	2	–	0	9	–	2	–	0
Bowling Green	4	–	2	–	0	8	–	3	–	0
Ohio	3	–	3	–	1	5	–	5	–	1
Toledo	4	–	4	–	0	5	–	6	–	0
Northern Illinois	2	–	3	–	0	3	–	8	–	0
Kent State	1	–	6	–	0	4	–	7	–	0
Western Michigan	0	–	7	–	0	1	–	10	–	0
$ – Conference champion; Rankings from AP Poll

The 1975 Ohio Bobcats football team was an American football team that represented Ohio University in the Mid-American Conference (MAC) during the 1975 NCAA Division I football season. In their 18th season under head coach Bill Hess, the Bobcats compiled a 5–5–1 record (3–3–1 against MAC opponents), finished in fifth place in the MAC, and outscored all opponents by a combined total of 164 to 143. They played their home games in Peden Stadium in Athens, Ohio.

== Schedule ==
Date	Opponent	Site	Result	Attendance	Source
September 13	at Central Michigan	Perry Shorts Stadium; Mount Pleasant, MI	T 6–6		
September 20	Ball State	Peden Stadium; Athens, OH	W 10–0	9,088	
September 27	Kent State	Peden Stadium; Athens, OH	W 23–21	14,022	
October 4	at Minnesota*	Memorial Stadium; Minneapolis, MN	L 0–21	27,486	
October 11	at William & Mary*	Cary Field; Williamsburg, VA	W 22–8	12,000	
October 18	at Miami (OH)	Miami Field; Oxford, OH (rivalry)	L 9–17		
October 25	at Toledo	Glass Bowl; Toledo, OH	L 10–14	14,194	
November 1	Western Michigan	Peden Stadium; Athens, OH	W 24–10	15,000	
November 8	Bowling Green	Peden Stadium; Athens, OH	L 17–19	11,435	
November 15	Cincinnati*	Peden Stadium; Athens, OH	L 5–6	13,850	
November 22	at Marshall*	Fairfield Stadium; Huntington, WV (rivalry)	W 38–21	7,234	
*Non-conference game
