= 1975 Toledo Rockets football team =

American college football season

1975 Toledo Rockets football
- Conference: Mid-American Conference
- Record: 5–6 (4–4 MAC)
- Head coach: Jack Murphy (5th season)
- Defensive coordinator: Dan Simrell (3rd season)
- Home stadium: Glass Bowl

1975 Mid-American Conference football standings
	Conf.					Overall
Team	W		L		T	W		L		T
No. 12 Miami (OH) $	6	–	0	–	0	11	–	1	–	0
Central Michigan	4	–	1	–	1	8	–	2	–	1
Ball State	4	–	2	–	0	9	–	2	–	0
Bowling Green	4	–	2	–	0	8	–	3	–	0
Ohio	3	–	3	–	1	5	–	5	–	1
Toledo	4	–	4	–	0	5	–	6	–	0
Northern Illinois	2	–	3	–	0	3	–	8	–	0
Kent State	1	–	6	–	0	4	–	7	–	0
Western Michigan	0	–	7	–	0	1	–	10	–	0
$ – Conference champion; Rankings from AP Poll

The 1975 Toledo Rockets football team was an American football team that represented the University of Toledo in the Mid-American Conference (MAC) during the 1975 NCAA Division I football season. In their fifth season under head coach Jack Murphy, the Rockets compiled a 5–6 record (4–4 against MAC opponents), finished in sixth place in the MAC, and were outscored by all opponents by a combined total of 277 to 244.

The team's statistical leaders included Gene Swick with 2,487 passing yards, Tim Zimmerman with 496 rushing yards, and Scott Resseguie with 683 receiving yards.

== Schedule ==
Date	Opponent	Site	Result	Attendance	Source
September 6	Western Carolina*	Glass Bowl; Toledo, OH	W 32–31	14,275	
September 13	at Ball State	Ball State Stadium; Muncie, IN	L 28–38	16,242	
September 20	at Villanova*	Villanova Stadium; Villanova, PA	L 10–14	8,500	
September 27	Central Michigan	Glass Bowl; Toledo, OH	L 27–34		
October 4	Dayton*	Glass Bowl; Toledo, OH	L 13–24	12,327	
October 11	at Bowling Green	Doyt Perry Stadium; Bowling Green, OH (rivalry)	L 17–34	16,737	
October 18	vs. Western Michigan	Cleveland Stadium; Cleveland, OH	W 25–7	2,000	
October 25	Ohio	Glass Bowl; Toledo, OH	W 14–10	14,194	
November 1	at No. 19 Miami (OH)	Miami Field; Oxford, OH	L 21–35		
November 8	at Northern Illinois	Huskie Stadium; DeKalb, IL	W 24–22	5,788	
November 22	Kent State	Glass Bowl; Toledo, OH	W 33–28	16,598	
*Non-conference game; Rankings from AP Poll released prior to the game

== Roster ==
1975 Toledo Rockets football team roster
Players			Coaches
Offense: Pos. / # / Name / Class; QB / 18 / Gene Swick / Sr	Defense: Pos. / # / Name / Class	Special teams: Pos. / # / Name / Class	Head coach: Jack Murphy; Coordinators/assistant coaches: Ron Graham – Offensive backs; Charlie Snyder – Wide receivers; Don Lewis – Offensive line; Dan Simrell – Defensive coordinator; Art Bascomb – Defensive ends/scouting coordinator; Irvin Wright – Defensive ends/tackles; Bill McConnell – Defensive mid-guards/linebackers; Legend: (C) Team captain; (S) Suspended; (I) Ineligible; Injured; Redshirt

== After the season ==
=== NFL draft ===
The following Rocket was selected in the 1976 NFL draft following the season.

Round	Pick	Player	Position	NFL club
4	97	Gene Swick	Quarterback	Cleveland Browns
