= 1975 Central Michigan Chippewas football team =

American college football season

1975 Central Michigan Chippewas football
- Conference: Mid-American Conference
- Record: 8–2–1 (4–1–1 MAC)
- Head coach: Roy Kramer (9th season)
- Defensive coordinator: Herb Deromedi (7th season)
- MVP: Wes Gamble
- Home stadium: Perry Shorts Stadium

1975 Mid-American Conference football standings
	Conf.					Overall
Team	W		L		T	W		L		T
No. 12 Miami (OH) $	6	–	0	–	0	11	–	1	–	0
Central Michigan	4	–	1	–	1	8	–	2	–	1
Ball State	4	–	2	–	0	9	–	2	–	0
Bowling Green	4	–	2	–	0	8	–	3	–	0
Ohio	3	–	3	–	1	5	–	5	–	1
Toledo	4	–	4	–	0	5	–	6	–	0
Northern Illinois	2	–	3	–	0	3	–	8	–	0
Kent State	1	–	6	–	0	4	–	7	–	0
Western Michigan	0	–	7	–	0	1	–	10	–	0
$ – Conference champion; Rankings from AP Poll

The 1975 Central Michigan Chippewas football team represented Central Michigan University in the Mid-American Conference (MAC) during the 1975 NCAA Division I football season. In their ninth season under head coach Roy Kramer, the Chippewas compiled an 8–2–1 record (4–1–1 against MAC opponents), finished in second place in the MAC standings, held eight of eleven opponents to fewer than 10 points, and outscored all opponents, 309 to 102. The team played its home games in Perry Shorts Stadium in Mount Pleasant, Michigan, with attendance of 105,600 in six home games.

Central Michigan made its debut at the NCAA Division I level during the 1975 season, having won the NCAA Division II Football Championship in 1974. The 1975 season was also the program's first as a member of the MAC. On September 6, 1975, the Chippewas defeated Western Michigan, 34–0, in their Division I and MAC debuts. The game was played before a record crowd of 20,800 at Perry Shorts Stadium. Central Michigan running back Walt "Smoke" Hodges rushed for 147 yards.

The team's two losses came in close games against Northern Michigan (16–17) and Ball State (13–16). The team also played Ohio to a 6–6 tie. The team did not play a game against MAC champion Miami (OH).

The team's statistical leaders included quarterback Ron Rummel with 586 passing yards, running back Walt Hodges with 1,025 rushing yards, and John Fossen with 211 receiving yards. Center Wes Gamble received the team's most valuable player award. Running back Walt Hodges, defensive back Jim Jones, defensive tackle John Neuman, and linebacker Bill Schmidt received first-team All-MAC honors. Running back Michael Woroniecki appeared in all 11 of the team's games and scored a rushing touchdown.

== Schedule ==
Date	Opponent	Site	Result	Attendance	Source
September 6	Western Michigan	Perry Shorts Stadium; Mount Pleasant, MI (rivalry)	W 34–0	20,800	
September 13	Ohio	Perry Shorts Stadium; Mount Pleasant, MI	T 6–6		
September 20	Northern Michigan*	Perry Shorts Stadium; Mount Pleasant, MI	L 16–17	19,600	
September 27	at Toledo	Glass Bowl; Toledo, OH	W 34–27		
October 4	at Illinois State*	Hancock Stadium; Normal, IL	W 42–7		
October 11	Eastern Michigan*	Perry Shorts Stadium; Mount Pleasant, MI (rivalry)	W 20–7	21,100	
October 18	at Ball State	Ball State Stadium; Muncie, IN	L 13–16		
October 25	at Kent State	Dix Stadium; Kent, OH	W 17–8		
November 1	Marshall*	Perry Shorts Stadium; Mount Pleasant, MI	W 34–0	14,600	
November 8	at Western Illinois*	Hanson Field; Macomb, IL	W 24–7		
November 15	Northern Illinois	Perry Shorts Stadium; Mount Pleasant, MI	W 69–7	12,100	
*Non-conference game
