= Jack Murphy (American football) =

American football player and coach (1932–2021)

Biographical details
- Born: August 6, 1932; Barberton, Ohio, U.S.
- Died: January 9, 2021 (aged 88); Toledo, Ohio, U.S.

Playing career

Football
- early 1950s: Heidelberg (OH)

Coaching career (HC unless noted)

Football
- 1959: Heidelberg (OH) (assistant)
- 1960–1969: Toledo (assistant)
- 1970: Heidelberg (OH)
- 1971–1976: Toledo

Baseball
- 1959: Heidelberg (OH)

Head coaching record
- Overall: 38–38 (football); 5–11 (baseball)
- Bowls: 1–0

Accomplishments and honors

Championships
- Football; 1 MAC (1971)

Awards
- Football; MAC Coach of the Year (1971)

John A. Murphy (August 6, 1932 – January 9, 2021) was an American football player and coach. He served as the head football coach at Heidelberg University in Tiffin, Ohio in 1970 and at the University of Toledo from 1971 to 1976, compiling a career college football head coaching record of 38–38. Murphy died on January 9, 2021, at the age of 88.

== Head coaching record ==
=== Football ===
Year	Team	Overall	Conference	Standing	Bowl/playoffs	Coaches^{#}	AP^{°}
Heidelberg Student Princes (Ohio Athletic Conference) (1970)
1970	Heidelberg	3–6	2–5	T–10th			
Heidelberg:		3–6	2–5				
Toledo Rockets (Mid-American Conference) (1971–1976)
1971	Toledo	12–0	5–0	1st	W Tangerine	13	14
1972	Toledo	6–5	2–3	T–4th			
1973	Toledo	3–8	1–4	T–5th			
1974	Toledo	6–5	3–2	T–2nd			
1975	Toledo	5–6	4–4	T–5th			
1976	Toledo	3–8	2–6	8th			
Toledo:		35–32	17–19				
Total:		38–38					
National championship Conference title Conference division title or championship game berth
