= 1975 Eastern Illinois Panthers football team =

American college football season

1975 Eastern Illinois Panthers football
- Conference: Independent
- Record: 3–5–2
- Head coach: John Konstantinos (1st season)
- Home stadium: O'Brien Stadium

1975 NCAA Division II independents football records
	Conf.			Overall
Team	W	L	T	W		L		T
No. 2 Northern Michigan ^		–		13	–	1	–	0
American International		–		8	–	1	–	0
Lehigh ^		–		9	–	3	–	0
Delaware		–		8	–	3	–	0
Portland State		–		8	–	3	–	0
Akron		–		7	–	4	–	0
Kentucky State		–		7	–	4	–	0
UNLV		–		7	–	4	–	0
Santa Clara		–		6	–	5	–	0
Tennessee State		–		5	–	4	–	0
Youngstown State		–		5	–	4	–	0
Chattanooga		–		5	–	5	–	1
Bucknell		–		5	–	5	–	0
Indiana State		–		5	–	5	–	0
Lafayette		–		5	–	5	–	0
Southern Connecticut State		–		5	–	5	–	0
Central Connecticut		–		4	–	5	–	0
Central State (OH)		–		4	–	6	–	0
Eastern Michigan		–		4	–	6	–	0
Eastern Illinois		–		3	–	5	–	2
Illinois College		–		3	–	6	–	0
Northeastern		–		3	–	6	–	0
Western Carolina		–		3	–	7	–	0
Nevada		–		3	–	8	–	0
Illinois State		–		2	–	7	–	1
Nebraska–Omaha		–		2	–	9	–	0
Arkansas–Pine Bluff		–		0	–	11	–	0
^ – NCAA Division II playoff participant; Rankings from AP Poll

The 1975 Eastern Illinois Panthers football team represented Eastern Illinois University during the 1975 NCAA Division II football season. The Panthers played their home games at O'Brien Stadium in Charleston, Illinois.

== Schedule ==
Date	Opponent	Site	Result	Attendance	Source
September 6	at Northern Iowa	O. R. Latham Stadium; Cedar Falls, IA	L 8–14	8,500	
September 13	at Northern Michigan	Memorial Field; Marquette, MI	L 22–38	5,325	
September 27	Southwest Missouri State	O'Brien Stadium; Charleston, IL	T 7–7	8,000	
October 4	at Central Missouri State	Audrey J. Walton Stadium; Warrensburg, MO	L 18–23	5,000	
October 11	at Tennessee Tech	Tucker Stadium; Cookeville, TN	L 0–37	9,000	
October 18	Western Illinois	O'Brien Stadium; Charleston, IL	T 3–3	7,500	
October 25	Ferris State	O'Brien Stadium; Charleston, IL	W 17–3	3,000	
November 8	at Missouri-Rolla	Allgood–Bailey Stadium; Rolla, MO	W 24–14	1,500	
November 15	Murray State	O'Brien Stadium; Charleston, IL	W 14–6	4,000	
November 22	Illinois State	O'Brien Stadium; Charleston, IL (rivalry)	L 13–31	2,500	
