= Doug Beaudoin =

American football player (born 1954)

No. 27, 44, 45
- Position: Safety

Personal information
- Born: May 15, 1954 (age 72); Dickinson, North Dakota, U.S.
- Listed height: 6 ft 1 in (1.85 m)
- Listed weight: 193 lb (88 kg)

Career information
- High school: Jamestown (ND)
- College: Minnesota
- NFL draft: 1976: 9th round, 243rd overall pick

Career history
- New England Patriots (1976–1979); Miami Dolphins (1980); San Diego Chargers (1981); Tampa Bay Bandits (1983–1985)

Awards and highlights
- Second-team All-Big Ten (1975)

Career NFL statistics
- Interceptions: 4
- INT yards: 55
- Fumble recoveries: 2
- Stats at Pro Football Reference

Douglas Lee Beaudoin (born May 15, 1954) is an American former professional football player who was a safety in the National Football League (NFL). He played college football for the Minnesota Golden Gophers and was selected by the New England Patriots in the ninth round of the 1976 NFL draft with the 243rd overall pick.

Beaudoin also played for the Miami Dolphins and San Diego Chargers.
