= Johnny Miller (American football) =

American football player (born 1954)

No. 66
- Position: Offensive guard

Personal information
- Born: February 3, 1954 (age 72); Ellerbe, North Carolina, U.S.
- Listed height: 6 ft 1 in (1.85 m)
- Listed weight: 247 lb (112 kg)

Career information
- College: Livingstone
- NFL draft: 1976: 14th round, 389th overall pick

Career history
- San Francisco 49ers (1976–1979); Philadelphia Eagles (1980)*
- * Offseason or practice squad member only
- Stats at Pro Football Reference

Johnny Ray Miller (born February 3, 1954) is an American former professional football offensive guard who played for the San Francisco 49ers of the National Football League (NFL). He played college football for the Livingstone Fighting Bears and was selected by the 49ers in the 14th round of the 1976 NFL draft.

== Early life ==
Johnny Ray Miller was born on February 3, 1954, in Ellerbe, North Carolina.

== College career ==
Miller played college football for the Division II Fighting Bears of Livingstone College as a nose guard. He earned All-Central Intercollegiate Athletic Association honors in both 1974 and 1975. He was also named an All-American by multiple selectors. Miller was inducted into the Livingstone Athletics Hall of Fame in 2002.

== Professional career ==
Miller selected by the San Francisco 49ers in the 14th round, with the 389th overall pick, of the 1976 NFL draft. He missed the 1976 season due to injury. He played in six games in 1977 as a reserve offensive guard. Miller was the first Livingstone College player to play in the NFL. He then missed the entire 1978 and 1979 seasons due to injury.

Miller became a free agent after the 1979 season and signed with the Philadelphia Eagles on June 20, 1980. However, he was later released.

== Personal life ==
After his NFL career, Miller became an administrator with the city of San Francisco.
