= Gene Swick =

American football player (born c. 1955)

Profile
- Position: Quarterback

Personal information
- Born: Licking County, Ohio, U.S.
- Listed height: 6 ft 1 in (1.85 m)
- Listed weight: 188 lb (85 kg)

Career information
- High school: Lakewood (Hebron, Ohio)
- College: Toledo
- NFL draft: 1976: 4th round, 97th overall pick

Career history
- Cleveland Browns (1976)*; New York Giants (1976)*
- * Offseason or practice squad member only

Awards and highlights
- Sammy Baugh Trophy (1975); First-team All-American (1975); 3× First-team All-MAC (1973–1975); 2× MAC Offensive Player of the Year (1974, 1975); Toledo Rockets No. 18 retired

Gene Swick (born c. 1955) is an American former college football player who was a quarterback for the Toledo Rockets from 1972 to 1975. In 1975, he set the National Collegiate Athletic Association (NCAA) Division I record with 8,074 career yards, which broke the previous record held by Jim Plunkett of Stanford and stood until surpassed by Mark Herrmann of Purdue in 1980. The Cleveland Browns of the National Football League (NFL) selected Swick in the fourth round of the 1976 NFL draft, but subsequently waived him during training camp.

== Early life ==
He was born the son of a minister, Jack Swick, in Licking County, Ohio. His family moved often, and he attended Millersport High School and Oak Hill High School each for one year, and Hebron Lakewood High School for his final two years. Swick chose to attend the University of Toledo to play college football because they ran a pass-oriented offense, which many larger schools such as Ohio State did not at the time. He said he received interest from Woody Hayes' Ohio State coaching staff, but that he did not wish to hand off the ball to a running back. Swick described Toledo's offense as often using four-receiver sets and eschewing short passing game in favor of attempts of ten yards or more.

== College career ==
At the University of Toledo, Swick played for the Rockets from 1972 to 1975, and earned varsity letters in each of his last three seasons. The Mid-American Conference named Swick to the All-MAC first-team in 1973, 1974, and 1975. The league selected him as the MAC Back of the Year in 1974 and 1975. In November 1974, the Associated Press called Swick the "hardest-working quarterback in the country with 44.6 rushing-passing plays per game." In 1975, Swick led the nation in total offensive yards with 2,706. He finished as the runner-up in completions with 17.3 per game, and passed for 15 touchdowns and rushed for eight more.

In the final game of his collegiate career against Kent State, Swick became the first player to record more than 8,000 career yards. His final career mark was 8,074 yards of total offense. He broke the former record of 7,887 yards held by Jim Plunkett of Stanford (1968–1970). Swick's benchmark was in turn surpassed in 1980 by Mark Herrmann of Purdue (1977–1980). Over the course of his collegiate career, Swick set numerous University of Toledo records for passing and offense.

The United Press International named Swick to its 1975 All-America first team, which makes him the only MAC quarterback to ever earn that honor from a major wire service. The Touchdown Club of Columbus awarded him the Sammy Baugh Trophy as the nation's best passer, and Football Roundup magazine selected him as the Offensive Player of the Year. He finished tenth in the voting for the Heisman Trophy. Swick played in the Senior Bowl for the North squad, and the East–West Shrine Game for the East squad.

- 1973: 165/301 for 2,234 yards with 15 TD vs 17 INT. 290 yards and 4 TD rushing.
- 1974: 178/287 for 2,234 yards with 13 TD vs 13 INT. 216 yards and 7 TD rushing.
- 1975: 190/308 for 2,487 yards with 15 TD vs 12 INT. 219 yards and 8 TD rushing.

== Professional career ==
Before the 1975 season, Swick had been considered a prospective first-round selection in the NFL draft according to The Chicago Tribune. However, in the 1976 NFL draft, Swick was not selected until the fourth round, where he was chosen with the 97th overall pick by the Cleveland Browns. The Associated Press wrote, "As advertised, it was emphatically not the year of the quarterback. Except for the Jets' selection of Todd, the passers were pretty much ignored." Accurate passer Mike Kruczek of Boston College was the second quarterback selected, despite not being a "name" player. Thus, touted quarterbacks Swick and Craig Penrose of San Diego State both fell to the fourth round.

The Browns signed Swick, alongside former Purdue quarterback Craig Nagel, in May 1976. His bonus was reported to be $20,000. Swick attended camp with a sore throwing arm, which reportedly hampered his performance. He said, "I didn't want to tell anybody because it would look like I was making excuses for myself. But it has come back strong now. I'm ready." During a summer scrimmage, he had a mediocre performance in which he completed six of 14 pass attempts for 44 yards and threw two interceptions. The franchise subsequently released Swick in July. He said, "There's not much I can say except I think they made a mistake. I'll just have to think over what my future in football might be. I haven't any complaint. They were good to me here, and I had the same opportunity as anyone else." His agent contacted several unnamed NFL teams with quarterback needs to secure another roster spot.

In August, he attended tryouts with the New York Giants, and had a "two-year, no-cut contract" with the Hamilton Tiger-Cats of the Canadian Football League. However, Swick said he did not like the style of play in Canada, and decided instead to enter business.

== Later life ==
After his playing career, Swick entered the manufacturing industry, in which he continued to work as of 2008. He resided in Buckeye Lake, Ohio, where he is self-employed. Swick has been inducted into the University of Toledo's Varsity 'T' Hall of Fame, and the Hebron Lakewood High School Hall of Fame.

The University of Toledo record for career passing yards set by Swick was finally broken by Bruce Gradkowski in 2005. Swick remained the last Toledo quarterback drafted into the NFL until Tampa Bay picked Gradkowski in the sixth round of the 2006 NFL draft.

== See also ==
- List of NCAA major college football yearly total offense leaders
