= 1975 Ball State Cardinals football team =

American college football season

1975 Ball State Cardinals football
- Conference: Mid-American Conference
- Record: 9–2 (4–2 MAC)
- Head coach: Dave McClain (5th season)
- Home stadium: Ball State Stadium

1975 Mid-American Conference football standings
	Conf.					Overall
Team	W		L		T	W		L		T
No. 12 Miami (OH) $	6	–	0	–	0	11	–	1	–	0
Central Michigan	4	–	1	–	1	8	–	2	–	1
Ball State	4	–	2	–	0	9	–	2	–	0
Bowling Green	4	–	2	–	0	8	–	3	–	0
Ohio	3	–	3	–	1	5	–	5	–	1
Toledo	4	–	4	–	0	5	–	6	–	0
Northern Illinois	2	–	3	–	0	3	–	8	–	0
Kent State	1	–	6	–	0	4	–	7	–	0
Western Michigan	0	–	7	–	0	1	–	10	–	0
$ – Conference champion; Rankings from AP Poll

The 1975 Ball State Cardinals football team was an American football team that represented Ball State University in the Mid-American Conference (MAC) during the 1975 NCAA Division I football season. In its fifth season under head coach Dave McClain, the team compiled a 9–2 record (4–2 against MAC opponents) and finished third in the conference.

The team's statistical leaders included Art Yaroch with 720 passing yards, Earl Taylor with 901 rushing yards and 48 points scored, and Mike Andress with 480 receiving yards.

== Schedule ==
Date	Opponent	Site	Result	Attendance	Source
September 6	Eastern Michigan*	Ball State Stadium; Muncie, IN	W 24–14	7,819	
September 13	Toledo	Ball State Stadium; Muncie, IN	W 38–28	16,242	
September 20	at Ohio	Peden Stadium; Athens, OH	L 0–10	9,088	
September 27	at Miami (OH)	Miami Field; Oxford, OH	L 28–35		
October 4	Indiana State*^{†}	Ball State Stadium; Muncie, IN (Blue Key Victory Bell)	W 20–16	18,224	
October 11	at Richmond*	City Stadium; Richmond, VA	W 25–14	11,000	
October 18	Central Michigan	Ball State Stadium; Muncie, IN	W 16–13		
October 25	at Northern Illinois	Huskie Stadium; DeKalb, IL (rivalry)	W 3–0		
November 1	at Bowling Green	Doyt Perry Stadium; Bowling Green, OH	W 27–20	13,286	
November 8	at Akron*	Rubber Bowl; Akron, OH	W 17–14	10,271	
November 15	Illinois State*	Ball State Stadium; Muncie, IN	W 46–7	9,850	
*Non-conference game; ^{†}Homecoming
