= 1975 Dayton Flyers football team =

American college football season

1975 Dayton Flyers football
- Conference: Independent
- Record: 5–6
- Head coach: Ron Marciniak (3rd season)
- Home stadium: Welcome Stadium

1975 NCAA Division I independents football records
	Conf.			Overall
Team	W	L	T	W		L		T
Rutgers		–		9	–	2	–	0
No. 10 Penn State		–		9	–	3	–	0
No. 20 West Virginia		–		9	–	3	–	0
Notre Dame		–		8	–	3	–	0
Virginia Tech		–		8	–	3	–	0
No. 15 Pittsburgh		–		8	–	4	–	0
Boston College		–		7	–	4	–	0
Georgia Tech		–		7	–	4	–	0
Memphis State		–		7	–	4	–	0
Navy		–		7	–	4	–	0
North Texas State		–		7	–	4	–	0
Southern Miss		–		7	–	4	–	0
South Carolina		–		7	–	5	–	0
Colgate		–		6	–	4	–	0
Cincinnati		–		6	–	5	–	0
Hawaii		–		6	–	5	–	0
Syracuse		–		6	–	5	–	0
Temple		–		6	–	5	–	0
Utah State		–		6	–	5	–	0
Dayton		–		5	–	6	–	0
Northeast Louisiana		–		4	–	6	–	1
Tulane		–		4	–	7	–	0
Villanova		–		4	–	7	–	0
Florida State		–		3	–	8	–	0
Air Force		–		2	–	8	–	1
Houston		–		2	–	8	–	0
Miami (FL)		–		2	–	8	–	0
Army		–		2	–	9	–	0
Marshall		–		2	–	9	–	0
Southern Illinois		–		1	–	9	–	1
Holy Cross		–		1	–	10	–	0
Louisville		–		1	–	10	–	0
Rankings from AP Poll

The 1975 Dayton Flyers football team represented the University of Dayton as an independent during the 1975 NCAA Division I football season. In their third season under head coach Ron Marciniak, the Flyers compiled a 5–6 record.

== Schedule ==
Date	Opponent	Site	Result	Attendance	Source
September 6	Western Kentucky	Welcome Stadium; Dayton, OH	L 7–27	11,300	
September 13	at Eastern Kentucky	Hanger Field; Richmond, KY	L 24–30	10,300	
September 20	Akron	Welcome Stadium; Dayton, OH	W 31–9	9,937	
September 27	Bowling Green	Welcome Stadium; Dayton, OH	L 14–21		
October 4	at Toledo	Glass Bowl; Toledo, OH	W 24–13	12,327	
October 11	at No. 20 Miami (OH)	Miami Field; Oxford, OH	L 0–10		
October 18	at Indiana State	Memorial Stadium; Terre Haute, IN	L 14–56	3,000–4,000	
October 25	at McNeese State	Cowboy Stadium; Lake Charles, LA	W 17–12	5,000	
November 1	Temple	Welcome Stadium; Dayton, OH	L 10–23	8,700	
November 8	at Louisville	Fairgrounds Stadium; Louisville, KY	W 32–13	9,888	
November 15	Marshall	Welcome Stadium; Dayton, OH	W 29–8		
Rankings from AP Poll released prior to the game
