= Ron Marciniak =

American football player and coach (1932–2020)

No. 64, 56
- Position: Guard

Personal information
- Born: July 16, 1932; Pittsburgh, Pennsylvania, U.S.
- Died: March 23, 2020 (aged 87); The Villages, Florida, U.S.
- Listed height: 6 ft 1 in (1.85 m)
- Listed weight: 218 lb (99 kg)

Career information
- High school: St. George (Pittsburgh)
- College: Kansas State (1951–1954)
- NFL draft: 1955: 7th round, 80th overall pick

Career history

Playing
- Washington Redskins (1955); Toronto Argonauts (1956)

Coaching
- Arizona (1959–1966) Assistant coach; Southern Illinois (1967–1968) Offensive line coach; Tulsa (1969) Offensive line coach; Northwestern (1970–1972) Offensive line coach; Dayton (1973–1976) Head coach; Miami (FL) (1977–1978) Offensive line coach; Colorado (1979–1981) Offensive line coach

Operations
- Dallas Cowboys (1983–1991); Baltimore Ravens (1996–2003)

Career NFL statistics
- Games played: 12
- Games started: 2
- Fumble recoveries: 1
- Stats at Pro Football Reference

Head coaching record
- Regular season: 17–26–1 (.398)

Ronald Joseph Marciniak (July 16, 1932 – March 23, 2020) was an American gridiron football player, coach, and scout. He played professionally as a guard in the National Football League (NFL) for the Washington Redskins and in the Canadian Football League (CFL) for the Toronto Argonauts. Marciniak was the head football coach at the University of Dayton from 1973 to 1976. He played college football at Kansas State University.

== Early life ==
Marciniak attended St. George High School in Pittsburgh, where he practiced football and wrestling. He accepted a football scholarship from Kansas State University. He received All-Big Eight honors at guard in 1954.

In 1995, he was inducted into the Pennsylvania Sports Hall of Fame.

== Professional career ==
Marciniak was selected by the Washington Redskins in the seventh round (80th overall) of the 1955 NFL draft. He played one season of professional football as an offensive guard for the Redskins in the National Football League. He played one season with the Toronto Argonauts in the Canadian Football League.

In 1957, Marciniak served as a player/coach for the Fort Bliss football team while he was a lieutenant in the United States Army. His collegiate coaching career began as an assistant at the University of Arizona (1959–1966). Marciniak then coached at Southern Illinois University Carbondale (1967–1968), the University of Tulsa (1969), Northwestern University (1970–1972), the University of Miami (1977–1978), and the University of Colorado Boulder (1979–1981). He served as the head football coach at the University of Dayton from 1973 to 1976, compiling a record of 17–26–/.

In 1982, Marciniak worked for the NFL Scouting Combine. In 1983, he was hired as a football scout by the Dallas Cowboys. In 1996, he was hired as a Baltimore Ravens scout. He was credited for the phrase "Play like a Raven" and the label "red-star player" for special on- and off-field qualities.

== Personal life ==
Marciniak died on March 23, 2020.

== Head coaching record ==
Year	Team	Overall	Conference	Standing	Bowl/playoffs
Dayton Flyers (NCAA Division I independent) (1973–1976)
1973	Dayton	5–5–1			
1974	Dayton	3–8			
1975	Dayton	5–6			
1976	Dayton	4–7			
Dayton:		17–26–1			
Total:		17–26–1			
