= 1975 Tangerine Bowl =

American college football game

Miami Redskins	South Carolina Gamecocks
(10–1)	(7–4)
MAC	Independent
20	7
Head coach: Dick Crum	Head coach: Jim Carlen
AP / Coaches; 16 / 20
	1	2	3	4	Total
Miami	7	7	3	3	20
South Carolina	0	0	7	0	7
- Date: December 20, 1975
- Season: 1975
- Stadium: Tangerine Bowl
- Location: Orlando, Florida
- MVP: Rob Carpenter, Miami (offensive); Jeff Kelly, Miami (defensive)
- Attendance: 20,247

The 1975 Tangerine Bowl was a college football bowl game played on December 20, 1975, at the Tangerine Bowl stadium in Orlando, Florida. The game featured the South Carolina Gamecocks and the Miami Redskins (located in Oxford, Ohio and now nicknamed the RedHawks).

== Background ==
Miami had won their third straight Mid-American Conference (MAC) title, accumulating a record of 31–1–1 over three seasons. As for South Carolina, this was their first bowl game since the 1969 Peach Bowl.

== Game summary ==
Miami scored two touchdowns in the first half, for a 14–0 lead at halftime. South Carolina got no closer than 17–7 in the third quarter, with Miami adding one more field goal in the fourth quarter, for a 20–7 final score. Miami tailback Rob Carpenter rushed for 120 yards on 29 carries and was named the game's outstanding offensive player, while his teammate Jeff Kelly was named outstanding defensive player.

== Scoring summary ==
Scoring summary

Quarter	Time	Drive			Team	Scoring information	Score	
Quarter	Time	Plays	Yards	TOP	Team	Scoring information	MU	SC
1	0:05	5	42		MU	Rob Carpenter 5-yard touchdown run, Fred Johnson kick good	7	0
2	9:--				MU	Rob Carpenter 1-yard touchdown run, Fred Johnson kick good	14	0
3	1:41				MU	47-yard field goal by Fred Johnson	17	0
3			73		SC	Tom Amrein 3-yard touchdown run, Bobby Marino kick good	17	7
4	5:02				MU	33-yard field goal by Fred Johnson	20	7
"TOP" = time of possession. For other American football terms, see Glossary of American football.							20	7

== Aftermath ==
Miami's next bowl appearance was the 1986 California Bowl, and they have not returned to the Citrus Bowl since this game. South Carolina's next bowl appearance was the 1979 Hall of Fame Classic. More than fifteen years later they returned to the Citrus Bowl, which had changed names and was the 2012 Capital One Bowl.

== Statistics ==
Statistics	Miami	South Carolina
First downs	19	17
Rushing yards	238	56
Passes attempted	13	29
Passes completed	10	18
Passes intercepted	1	1
Passing yards	137	228
Penalties–yards	5–35	3–24
Punts–average	4–35.8	6–44.8
Fumbles–lost	0–0	1–0
