= 1975 Nevada Wolf Pack football team =

American college football season

1975 Nevada Wolf Pack football
- Conference: Independent
- Record: 3–8
- Head coach: Jerry Scattini (7th season)
- Home stadium: Mackay Stadium

1975 NCAA Division II independents football records
	Conf.			Overall
Team	W	L	T	W		L		T
No. 2 Northern Michigan ^		–		13	–	1	–	0
American International		–		8	–	1	–	0
Lehigh ^		–		9	–	3	–	0
Delaware		–		8	–	3	–	0
Portland State		–		8	–	3	–	0
Akron		–		7	–	4	–	0
Kentucky State		–		7	–	4	–	0
UNLV		–		7	–	4	–	0
Santa Clara		–		6	–	5	–	0
Tennessee State		–		5	–	4	–	0
Youngstown State		–		5	–	4	–	0
Chattanooga		–		5	–	5	–	1
Bucknell		–		5	–	5	–	0
Indiana State		–		5	–	5	–	0
Lafayette		–		5	–	5	–	0
Southern Connecticut State		–		5	–	5	–	0
Central Connecticut		–		4	–	5	–	0
Central State (OH)		–		4	–	6	–	0
Eastern Michigan		–		4	–	6	–	0
Eastern Illinois		–		3	–	5	–	2
Northeastern		–		3	–	6	–	0
Western Carolina		–		3	–	7	–	0
Nevada		–		3	–	8	–	0
Nebraska–Omaha		–		2	–	9	–	0
Arkansas–Pine Bluff		–		0	–	11	–	0
^ – NCAA Division II playoff participant; Rankings from AP Poll

The 1975 Nevada Wolf Pack football team represented the University of Nevada, Reno as an independent during the 1975 NCAA Division II football season. Led by Jerry Scattini in his seventh and final season as head coach, the Wolf Pack compiled a record of 3–8. The team played home games at Mackay Stadium in Reno, Nevada.

Scattini was fired after the season.

== Schedule ==
Date	Opponent	Site	Result	Attendance	Source
September 13	at Portland State	Civic Stadium; Portland, OR	L 0–37	4,500	
September 20	Willamette	Mackay Stadium; Reno, NV	W 36–14	4,600	
September 27	Sacramento State	Mackay Stadium; Reno, NV	L 16–36	3,500–3,525	
October 4	Simon Fraser	Mackay Stadium; Reno, NV	L 10–17	2,150	
October 11	Cal Poly^{†}	Mackay Stadium; Reno, NV	W 16–8	5,000–5,505	
October 18	at Chico State	University Stadium; Chico, CA	L 3–6	1,200–1,500	
October 25	at Cal State Hayward	Pioneer Stadium; Hayward, CA	W 17–10	500	
November 1	No. 10 Idaho State	Mackay Stadium; Reno, NV	L 3–28	2,200–2,900	
November 8	No. 3 Boise State	Mackay Stadium; Reno, NV (rivalry)	L 6–49	5,150	
November 15	at Santa Clara	Buck Shaw Stadium; Santa Clara, CA	L 7–35	4,705	
November 22	UNLV	Mackay Stadium; Reno, NV (Fremont Cannon)	L 7–45	5,800	
^{†}Homecoming; Rankings from AP Poll released prior to the game
