= 1975 Akron Zips football team =

American college football season

1975 Akron Zips football
- Conference: Independent
- Record: 7–4
- Head coach: Jim Dennison (3rd season)
- Captain: Paul Dorando; Mark Fowler
- Home stadium: Rubber Bowl

1975 NCAA Division II independents football records
	Conf.			Overall
Team	W	L	T	W		L		T
No. 2 Northern Michigan ^		–		13	–	1	–	0
American International		–		8	–	1	–	0
Lehigh ^		–		9	–	3	–	0
Delaware		–		8	–	3	–	0
Portland State		–		8	–	3	–	0
Akron		–		7	–	4	–	0
Kentucky State		–		7	–	4	–	0
UNLV		–		7	–	4	–	0
Santa Clara		–		6	–	5	–	0
Tennessee State		–		5	–	4	–	0
Youngstown State		–		5	–	4	–	0
Chattanooga		–		5	–	5	–	1
Bucknell		–		5	–	5	–	0
Indiana State		–		5	–	5	–	0
Lafayette		–		5	–	5	–	0
Southern Connecticut State		–		5	–	5	–	0
Central Connecticut		–		4	–	5	–	0
Central State (OH)		–		4	–	6	–	0
Eastern Michigan		–		4	–	6	–	0
Eastern Illinois		–		3	–	5	–	2
Illinois College		–		3	–	6	–	0
Northeastern		–		3	–	6	–	0
Western Carolina		–		3	–	7	–	0
Nevada		–		3	–	8	–	0
Nebraska–Omaha		–		2	–	9	–	0
Arkansas–Pine Bluff		–		0	–	11	–	0
^ – NCAA Division II playoff participant; Rankings from AP Poll

The 1975 Akron Zips football team represented Akron University in the 1975 NCAA Division II football season as an independent. Led by third-year head coach Jim Dennison, the Zips played their home games at the Rubber Bowl in Akron, Ohio. They finished the season with a record of 7–4.

== Schedule ==
Date	Opponent	Site	Result	Attendance	Source
September 6	Marshall	Rubber Bowl; Akron, OH	W 20–8	27,949	
September 13	at Western Michigan	Waldo Stadium; Kalamazoo, MI	W 27–21	14,200	
September 20	at Dayton	Welcome Stadium; Dayton, OH	L 9–31	9,937	
September 27	Central State (OH)	Rubber Bowl; Akron, OH	W 34–8	11,242	
October 4	at No. 10 Delaware	Delaware Stadium; Newark, DE	L 0–21	18,460–18,640	
October 11	at No. 6 Northern Michigan	Memorial Field; Marquette, MI	W 30–13	6,013	
October 18	Temple	Rubber Bowl; Akron, OH	W 24–23	8,326	
October 25	Youngstown State	Rubber Bowl; Akron, OH (Steel Tire)	W 17–6	10,241	
November 1	Indiana State	Rubber Bowl; Akron, OH	W 14–11	6,582	
November 8	Ball State	Rubber Bowl; Akron, OH	L 14–17	10,271	
November 15	at Morehead State	Jayne Stadium; Morehead, KY	L 0–7	1,910	
Rankings from AP Poll released prior to the game
