= 1975 Bucknell Bison football team =

American college football season

1975 Bucknell Bison football
- Conference: Independent
- Record: 5–4
- Head coach: Bob Curtis (1st season)
- Captains: Ralph Turri; Rick Wardrop
- Home stadium: Memorial Stadium

1975 NCAA Division II independents football records
	Conf.			Overall
Team	W	L	T	W		L		T
No. 2 Northern Michigan ^		–		13	–	1	–	0
American International		–		8	–	1	–	0
Lehigh ^		–		9	–	3	–	0
Delaware		–		8	–	3	–	0
Portland State		–		8	–	3	–	0
Akron		–		7	–	4	–	0
Kentucky State		–		7	–	4	–	0
UNLV		–		7	–	4	–	0
Santa Clara		–		6	–	5	–	0
Tennessee State		–		5	–	4	–	0
Youngstown State		–		5	–	4	–	0
Chattanooga		–		5	–	5	–	1
Bucknell		–		5	–	5	–	0
Indiana State		–		5	–	5	–	0
Lafayette		–		5	–	5	–	0
Southern Connecticut State		–		5	–	5	–	0
Central Connecticut		–		4	–	5	–	0
Central State (OH)		–		4	–	6	–	0
Eastern Michigan		–		4	–	6	–	0
Eastern Illinois		–		3	–	5	–	2
Northeastern		–		3	–	6	–	0
Western Carolina		–		3	–	7	–	0
Nevada		–		3	–	8	–	0
Nebraska–Omaha		–		2	–	9	–	0
Arkansas–Pine Bluff		–		0	–	11	–	0
^ – NCAA Division II playoff participant; Rankings from AP Poll

The 1975 Bucknell Bison football team was an American football team that represented Bucknell University as an independent during the 1975 NCAA Division II football season.

In their first year under head coach Bob Curtis, the Bison compiled a 5–4 record. Ralph Turri and Rick Wardrop were the team captains.

Bucknell played its home games at Memorial Stadium on the university campus in Lewisburg, Pennsylvania.

== Schedule ==
Date	Opponent	Site	Result	Attendance	Source
September 20	at Rutgers	Rutgers Stadium; Piscataway, NJ	L 3–47	12,500	
September 27	at Maine	Alumni Stadium; Orono, ME	L 0–17	5,300–6,000	
October 4	Cornell^{†}	Memorial Stadium; Lewisburg, PA	L 6–21	9,500	
October 11	at Lafayette	Fisher Field; Easton, PA	W 15–5	5,000	
October 18	Boston University^	Memorial Stadium; Lewisburg, PA	L 0–16	7,500	
October 25	at Gettysburg	Musselman Stadium; Gettysburg, PA	W 14–7	5,200	
November 1	Washington & Lee	Memorial Stadium; Lewisburg, PA	W 54–0	3,900	
November 8	at Colgate	Andy Kerr Stadium; Hamilton, NY	W 24–16	6,000	
November 15	No. 4 Lehigh	Memorial Stadium; Lewisburg, PA	W 32–25	7,500	
^{†}Homecoming; ^ Parents Weekend; Rankings from UPI Division II Coaches Poll
