= 1975 Northern Michigan Wildcats football team =

American college football season

1975 Northern Michigan Wildcats football

NCAA Division II champion

NCAA Division II Championship Game, W 16–14 vs. Western Kentucky
- Conference: Independent
- Record: 13–1
- Head coach: Gil Krueger (2nd season)
- Home stadium: Memorial Field

1975 NCAA Division II independents football records
	Conf.			Overall
Team	W	L	T	W		L		T
No. 2 Northern Michigan ^		–		13	–	1	–	0
American International		–		8	–	1	–	0
Lehigh ^		–		9	–	3	–	0
Delaware		–		8	–	3	–	0
Portland State		–		8	–	3	–	0
Akron		–		7	–	4	–	0
Kentucky State		–		7	–	4	–	0
UNLV		–		7	–	4	–	0
Santa Clara		–		6	–	5	–	0
Tennessee State		–		5	–	4	–	0
Youngstown State		–		5	–	4	–	0
Chattanooga		–		5	–	5	–	1
Bucknell		–		5	–	5	–	0
Indiana State		–		5	–	5	–	0
Lafayette		–		5	–	5	–	0
Southern Connecticut State		–		5	–	5	–	0
Central Connecticut		–		4	–	5	–	0
Central State (OH)		–		4	–	6	–	0
Eastern Michigan		–		4	–	6	–	0
Eastern Illinois		–		3	–	5	–	2
Northeastern		–		3	–	6	–	0
Western Carolina		–		3	–	7	–	0
Nevada		–		3	–	8	–	0
Nebraska–Omaha		–		2	–	9	–	0
Arkansas–Pine Bluff		–		0	–	11	–	0
^ – NCAA Division II playoff participant; Rankings from AP Poll

The 1975 Northern Michigan Wildcats football team was an American football team that represented Northern Michigan University as an independent during the 1975 NCAA Division II football season. In their second year under head coach Gil Krueger, the Wildcats compiled a 13–1 record and won the NCAA Division II national championship, defeating Western Kentucky in the Division II championship game. The previous season, the 1974 Wildcats were winless at 0–10.

The 1975 team was led by sophomore quarterback Steve Mariucci, later a head coach in the National Football League (NFL) for nine seasons. Mariucci completed 89 of 169 passes for 1,624 yards and also rushed for 141 yards. The team's other statistical leaders included Stu Betts with 907 rushing yards and 48 points scored and Zachary Fowler with 33 receptions for 675 yards.

== Schedule ==
Date	Opponent	Rank	Site	Result	Attendance	Source
September 6	Wisconsin–Whitewater		Memorial Field; Marquette, MI	W 34–0	4,912	
September 13	Eastern Illinois		Memorial Field; Marquette, MI	W 38–22	5,325	
September 20	at Central Michigan		Perry Shorts Stadium; Mount Pleasant, MI	W 17–16	19,600	
September 27	Nebraska–Omaha	No. 11	Memorial Field; Marquette, MI	W 41–14	5,801	
October 4	Youngstown State	No. 8	Memorial Field; Marquette, MI	W 15–0	7,926	
October 11	Akron	No. 6	Memorial Field; Marquette, MI	L 13–30	6,013	
October 18	at Eastern Michigan	No. 14	Rynearson Stadium; Ypsilanti, MI	W 20–7	7,220	
October 25	Saginaw Valley	No. 9	Memorial Field; Marquette, MI	W 20–15	4,667	
November 1	Grand Valley State	No. 11	Memorial Field; Marquette, MI	W 21–17	4,002	
November 8	at St. Norbert	No. 11	Minahan Stadium; De Pere, WI	W 42–14	3,750	
November 15	at Western Illinois	No. 6	Hanson Field; Macomb, IL	W 27–23	6,423	
November 29	at No. 6 Boise State	No. 5	Bronco Stadium; Boise, ID (NCAA Division II Quarterfinal)	W 24–21	17,347	
December 6	vs. Livingston	No. 5	Memorial Stadium; Wichita Falls, TX (Pioneer Bowl–NCAA Division II Semifinal)	W 28–26	10,400	
December 13	vs. No. 4 Western Kentucky	No. 5	Hughes Stadium; Sacramento, CA (Camellia Bowl—NCAA Division II Championship Game)	W 16–14	12,017	
Rankings from AP Poll released prior to the game
