= 1975 Indiana State Sycamores football team =

American college football season

1975 Indiana State Sycamores football
- Conference: Independent
- Record: 5–5
- Head coach: Tom Harp (3rd season)
- Home stadium: Memorial Stadium

1975 NCAA Division II independents football records
	Conf.			Overall
Team	W	L	T	W		L		T
No. 2 Northern Michigan ^		–		13	–	1	–	0
American International		–		8	–	1	–	0
Lehigh ^		–		9	–	3	–	0
Delaware		–		8	–	3	–	0
Portland State		–		8	–	3	–	0
Akron		–		7	–	4	–	0
Kentucky State		–		7	–	4	–	0
UNLV		–		7	–	4	–	0
Santa Clara		–		6	–	5	–	0
Tennessee State		–		5	–	4	–	0
Youngstown State		–		5	–	4	–	0
Chattanooga		–		5	–	5	–	1
Bucknell		–		5	–	5	–	0
Indiana State		–		5	–	5	–	0
Lafayette		–		5	–	5	–	0
Southern Connecticut State		–		5	–	5	–	0
Central Connecticut		–		4	–	5	–	0
Central State (OH)		–		4	–	6	–	0
Eastern Michigan		–		4	–	6	–	0
Eastern Illinois		–		3	–	5	–	2
Illinois College		–		3	–	6	–	0
Northeastern		–		3	–	6	–	0
Western Carolina		–		3	–	7	–	0
Nevada		–		3	–	8	–	0
Illinois State		–		2	–	7	–	1
Nebraska–Omaha		–		2	–	9	–	0
Arkansas–Pine Bluff		–		0	–	11	–	0
^ – NCAA Division II playoff participant; Rankings from AP Poll

The 1975 Indiana State Sycamores football team represented Indiana State University as an independent during the 1975 NCAA Division II football season. The team was led by third-year head coach Tom Harp and played their home games at Memorial Stadium in Terre Haute, Indiana. The Sycamores finished the season with a 5–5 record.

== Schedule ==
Date	Opponent	Site	Result	Attendance	Source
September 13	at Eastern Michigan	Rynearson Stadium; Ypsilanti, MI	L 7–30	7,221	
September 20	at Southern Illinois	McAndrew Stadium; Carbondale, IL	W 23–21	10,320	
October 4	at Ball State	Ball State Stadium; Muncie, IN (rivalry)	L 16–20	18,224	
October 11	Northern Illinois	Memorial Stadium; Terre Haute, IN	W 21–10	9,672	
October 18	Dayton	Memorial Stadium; Terre Haute, IN	W 56–14	3,000–4,000	
October 25	Illinois State^{†}	Memorial Stadium; Terre Haute, IN	W 42–13	16,684	
November 1	at Akron	Rubber Bowl; Akron, OH	L 11–14	6,586	
November 8	Nebraska–Omaha	Memorial Stadium; Terre Haute, IN	W 26–9	6,351	
November 15	Tulsa	Skelly Stadium; Tulsa, OK	L 7–62	21,500	
November 22	Delaware	Delaware Stadium; Newark, DE	L 7–46	17,726	
^{†}Homecoming
