= 1975 Lafayette Leopards football team =

American college football season

1975 Lafayette Leopards football
- Conference: Independent
- Record: 5–5
- Head coach: Neil Putnam (5th season)
- Captains: John Grimes; Mark Jones
- Home stadium: Fisher Field

1975 NCAA Division II independents football records
	Conf.			Overall
Team	W	L	T	W		L		T
No. 2 Northern Michigan ^		–		13	–	1	–	0
American International		–		8	–	1	–	0
Lehigh ^		–		9	–	3	–	0
Delaware		–		8	–	3	–	0
Portland State		–		8	–	3	–	0
Akron		–		7	–	4	–	0
Kentucky State		–		7	–	4	–	0
UNLV		–		7	–	4	–	0
Santa Clara		–		6	–	5	–	0
Tennessee State		–		5	–	4	–	0
Youngstown State		–		5	–	4	–	0
Chattanooga		–		5	–	5	–	1
Bucknell		–		5	–	5	–	0
Indiana State		–		5	–	5	–	0
Lafayette		–		5	–	5	–	0
Southern Connecticut State		–		5	–	5	–	0
Central Connecticut		–		4	–	5	–	0
Central State (OH)		–		4	–	6	–	0
Eastern Michigan		–		4	–	6	–	0
Eastern Illinois		–		3	–	5	–	2
Illinois College		–		3	–	6	–	0
Northeastern		–		3	–	6	–	0
Western Carolina		–		3	–	7	–	0
Nevada		–		3	–	8	–	0
Nebraska–Omaha		–		2	–	9	–	0
Arkansas–Pine Bluff		–		0	–	11	–	0
^ – NCAA Division II playoff participant; Rankings from AP Poll

The 1975 Lafayette Leopards football team was an American football team that represented Lafayette College as an independent during the 1975 NCAA Division II football season. In their fifth year under head coach Neil Putnam, the Leopards compiled a 5–5 record. Mark Jones and John Grimes were the team captains. Lafayette played its home games at Fisher Field on College Hill in Easton, Pennsylvania.

== Schedule ==
Date	Opponent	Site	Result	Attendance	Source
September 20	at Merchant Marine	Tomb Field; Kings Point, NY	W 7–3	4,100	
September 27	Columbia	Fisher Field; Easton, PA	W 10–7	5,000	
October 4	Hofstra	Fisher Field; Easton, PA	W 31–19	2,500	
October 11	Bucknell	Fisher Field; Easton, PA	L 5–15	5,000	
October 17	at Penn	Franklin Field; Philadelphia, PA	L 0–13	3,127–3,176	
October 25	at Colgate	Andy Kerr Stadium; Hamilton, NY	L 2–56	7,500	
November 1	Gettysburg	Fisher Field; Easton, PA	W 20–12	5,000–5,500	
November 8	at Rutgers	Rutgers Stadium; Piscataway, NJ	L 6–48	12,000	
November 15	Davidson	Fisher Field; Easton, PA	W 31–3	3,000	
November 22	at No. 13 Lehigh	Taylor Stadium; Bethlehem, PA (The Rivalry)	L 14–40	17,000–17,300	
Rankings from AP Poll released prior to the game

== Roster ==
1975 Lafayette Leopards football team roster
Players			Coaches
Offense: Pos. / # / Name / Class; QB / 15 / Mark Jones / Sr	Defense: Pos. / # / Name / Class	Special teams: Pos. / # / Name / Class	Head coach: Neil Putnam; Coordinators/assistant coaches Legend: (C) Team captain; (S) Suspended; (I) Ineligible; Injured; Redshirt
