= 1975 Bowling Green Falcons football team =

American college football season

1975 Bowling Green Falcons football
- Conference: Mid-American Conference
- Record: 8–3 (4–2 MAC)
- Head coach: Don Nehlen (8th season)
- Home stadium: Doyt Perry Stadium

1975 Mid-American Conference football standings
	Conf.					Overall
Team	W		L		T	W		L		T
No. 12 Miami (OH) $	6	–	0	–	0	11	–	1	–	0
Central Michigan	4	–	1	–	1	8	–	2	–	1
Ball State	4	–	2	–	0	9	–	2	–	0
Bowling Green	4	–	2	–	0	8	–	3	–	0
Ohio	3	–	3	–	1	5	–	5	–	1
Toledo	4	–	4	–	0	5	–	6	–	0
Northern Illinois	2	–	3	–	0	3	–	8	–	0
Kent State	1	–	6	–	0	4	–	7	–	0
Western Michigan	0	–	7	–	0	1	–	10	–	0
$ – Conference champion; Rankings from AP Poll

The 1975 Bowling Green Falcons football team was an American football team that represented Bowling Green University in the Mid-American Conference (MAC) during the 1975 NCAA Division I football season. In their eighth season under head coach Don Nehlen, the Falcons compiled an 8–3 record (4–2 against MAC opponents), finished in fourth place in the MAC, and outscored their opponents by a combined total of 278 to 166.

The team's statistical leaders included Mark Miller with 1,252 passing yards, Dan Saleet with 1,114 rushing yards, and Dave Dudley with 338 receiving yards.

== Schedule ==
Date	Opponent	Site	Result	Attendance	Source
September 13	at BYU*	Cougar Stadium; Provo, UT	W 23–21	29,718	
September 20	Southern Miss*	Doyt Perry Stadium; Bowling Green, OH	W 16–14	14,369	
September 27	at Dayton*	Welcome Stadium; Dayton, OH	W 21–14		
October 4	Western Michigan	Doyt Perry Stadium; Bowling Green, OH	W 28–0	13,090	
October 11	Toledo	Doyt Perry Stadium; Bowling Green, OH (rivalry)	W 34–17	16,737	
October 18	vs. Kent State	Cleveland Stadium; Cleveland, OH (rivalry)	W 35–9		
October 25	Miami (OH)	Doyt Perry Stadium; Bowling Green, OH	L 17–20	24,194	
November 1	Ball State	Doyt Perry Stadium; Bowling Green, OH	L 20–27	13,286	
November 8	at Ohio	Peden Stadium; Athens, OH	W 19–17	11,435	
November 15	at Southern Illinois*	McAndrew Stadium; Carbondale, IL	W 48–6		
November 22	at UT Arlington*	Arlington Stadium; Arlington, TX	L 17–21	4,500	
*Non-conference game
