= 1975 Miami Redskins football team =

American college football season

1975 Miami Redskins football

MAC champion Tangerine Bowl champion

Tangerine Bowl, W 20–7 vs. South Carolina
- Conference: Mid-American Conference

Ranking
- Coaches: No. 16
- AP: No. 12
- Record: 11–1 (6–0 MAC)
- Head coach: Dick Crum (2nd season)
- Defensive coordinator: Joe Novak (2nd season)
- Home stadium: Miami Field

1975 Mid-American Conference football standings
	Conf.					Overall
Team	W		L		T	W		L		T
No. 12 Miami (OH) $	6	–	0	–	0	11	–	1	–	0
Central Michigan	4	–	1	–	1	8	–	2	–	1
Ball State	4	–	2	–	0	9	–	2	–	0
Bowling Green	4	–	2	–	0	8	–	3	–	0
Ohio	3	–	3	–	1	5	–	5	–	1
Toledo	4	–	4	–	0	5	–	6	–	0
Northern Illinois	2	–	3	–	0	3	–	8	–	0
Kent State	1	–	6	–	0	4	–	7	–	0
Western Michigan	0	–	7	–	0	1	–	10	–	0
$ – Conference champion; Rankings from AP Poll

The 1975 Miami Redskins football team was an American football team that represented Miami University during the 1975 NCAA Division I football season. In their second season under head coach Dick Crum, the Redskins won the Mid-American Conference (MAC) championship, compiled an 11–1 record (6–0 against MAC opponents), outscored all opponents by a combined total of 306 to 141, defeated South Carolina, 20–7, in the Tangerine Bowl, and were ranked #12 in the final AP Poll. The team's sole loss was to Michigan State by a 14–13 score in the second game of the season.

The team's statistical leaders included Sherman Smith with 729 passing yards and 1,002 rushing yards, Rob Carpenter with 1,142 rushing yards, and Steve Joecken with 293 receiving yards.

== Schedule ==
Date	Opponent	Rank	Site	Result	Attendance	Source
September 13	Marshall*		Miami Field; Oxford, OH	W 50–0	8,109	
September 20	at Michigan State*	No. 19	Spartan Stadium; East Lansing, MI	L 13–14	61,444	
September 27	Ball State		Miami Field; Oxford, OH	W 35–28		
October 4	at Purdue*		Ross–Ade Stadium; West Lafayette, IN	W 14–3	52,309	
October 11	Dayton*	No. 20	Miami Field; Oxford, OH	W 10–0		
October 18	Ohio		Miami Field; Oxford, OH (rivalry)	W 17–9		
October 25	at Bowling Green		Doyt Perry Stadium; Bowling Green, OH	W 20–17	24,194	
November 1	Toledo	No. 19	Miami Field; Oxford, OH	W 35–21		
November 8	at Western Michigan	No. 17	Waldo Stadium; Kalamazoo, MI	W 44–21		
November 15	at Kent State	No. 16	Dix Stadium; Kent, OH	W 27–8	14,162	
November 22	Cincinnati*	No. 16	Miami Field; Oxford, OH (rivalry)	W 21–13		
December 20	vs. South Carolina*	No. 16	Tangerine Bowl; Orlando, FL (Tangerine Bowl)	W 20–7	20,247	
*Non-conference game; Rankings from AP Poll released prior to the game
