= Bronze Stalk Trophy =

Collegiate trophy

Battle for the Bronze Stalk
- Ball State Cardinals Northern Illinois Huskies
- Sport: Football
- First meeting: October 4, 1941; Ball State 6, Northern Illinois 6
- Latest meeting: October 25, 2025; Ball State 7, Northern Illinois 21
- Next meeting: none planned
- Trophy: Bronze Stalk Trophy (2008–present)

Statistics
- Total meetings: 53
- All-time series: NIU, 26–25–2
- Trophy series: Northern Illinois leads, 12–6
- Largest victory: NIU 63–17 (2017)
- Longest win streak: NIU, 10 (2009–2018)
- Current win streak: NIU, 1 (2025)

Locations of Ball State and Northern Illinois

The Bronze Stalk Trophy was presented to the winner of the annual college football game between Mid-American Conference rivals Northern Illinois University in DeKalb, Illinois and Ball State University in Muncie, Indiana. The two interstate rivals began competing for this trophy in 2008.

Designed by nationally recognized sculptor and DeKalb artist Renee Bemis, the trophy depicts several cornstalks in tribute to the prevalence of maize around the respective home states of the rivals.

The first meeting between the two occurred in 1941, a 6–6 tie. After the 2025 contest, Northern Illinois holds the all-time lead in the series, 26–25–2. Ball State won the inaugural contest for the Bronze Stalk at Scheumann Stadium in 2008, with Northern Illinois winning the trophy for the first time the following season on Brigham Field at Huskie Stadium. With Northern Illinois football moving to the Mountain West Conference in 2026, there are currently no plans to continue the rivalry as a non-conference matchup.

== Game results ==
Ball State victories	Northern Illinois victories	Tie games

No.	Date	Location	Winner	Score
1	October 4, 1941	DeKalb, IL	Tie	6–6
2	October 17, 1942	Muncie, IN	Ball State	14–0
3	October 8, 1966	Muncie, IN	Northern Illinois	38–24
4	October 7, 1967	DeKalb, IL	Northern Illinois	28–14
5	September 14, 1968	Muncie, IN	Northern Illinois	40–20
6	October 25, 1969	DeKalb, IL	Northern Illinois	17–13
7	October 24, 1970	Muncie, IN	Northern Illinois	31–14
8	October 23, 1971	DeKalb, IL	Tie	10–10
9	October 20, 1973	DeKalb, IL	Northern Illinois	45–17
10	November 9, 1974	Muncie, IN	Ball State	31–21
11	October 25, 1975	DeKalb, IL	Ball State	3–0
12	October 30, 1976	DeKalb, IL	Ball State	33–7
13	October 15, 1977	Muncie, IN	Ball State	31–6
14	November 18, 1978	DeKalb, IL	Ball State	31–13
15	November 17, 1979	Muncie, IN	Ball State	42–0
16	September 13, 1980	DeKalb, IL	Ball State	18–17
17	October 3, 1981	Muncie, IN	Ball State	23–0
18	October 2, 1982	DeKalb, IL	Ball State	14–7
19	October 1, 1983	Muncie, IN	Northern Illinois	27–14
20	September 29, 1984	DeKalb, IL	Ball State	15–14
21	October 5, 1985	Muncie, IN	Ball State	29–0
22	August 30, 1986	DeKalb, IL	Ball State	20–10
23	October 31, 1987	Muncie, IN	Ball State	42–17
24	October 29, 1988	DeKalb, IL	Ball State	18–17
25	October 25, 1997	DeKalb, IL	Ball State	21–14
26	October 3, 1998	Muncie, IN	Ball State	18–13
27	October 9, 1999	DeKalb, IL	Northern Illinois	37–17

No.	Date	Location	Winner	Score
28	September 30, 2000	Muncie, IN	Northern Illinois	43–14
29	November 17, 2001	DeKalb, IL	Northern Illinois	33–29
30	October 5, 2002	Muncie, IN	Northern Illinois	41–29
31	November 1, 2003	DeKalb, IL	#21 Northern Illinois	48–23
32	October 30, 2004	Muncie, IN	Northern Illinois	38–31
33	October 29, 2005	DeKalb, IL	Ball State	31–17
34	September 30, 2006	Muncie, IN	Northern Illinois	40–28
35	November 24, 2007	DeKalb, IL	Ball State	27–21
36	November 5, 2008	Muncie, IN	#16 Ball State	45–14
37	November 12, 2009	DeKalb, IL	Northern Illinois	26–20
38	November 20, 2010	Muncie, IN	Northern Illinois	59–21
39	November 15, 2011	DeKalb, IL	Northern Illinois	41–38
40	October 6, 2012	Muncie, IN	Northern Illinois	35–23
41	November 13, 2013	DeKalb, IL	#20 Northern Illinois	48–27
42	November 5, 2014	Muncie, IN	Northern Illinois	35–21
43	October 10, 2015	DeKalb, IL	Northern Illinois	59–41
44	October 1, 2016	Muncie, IN	Northern Illinois	31–24
45	November 9, 2017	DeKalb, IL	Northern Illinois	63–17
46	October 6, 2018	Muncie, IN	Northern Illinois	24–16
47	October 5, 2019	DeKalb, IL	Ball State	27–20
48	November 18, 2020	Muncie, IN	Ball State	31–25
49	November 10, 2021	DeKalb, IL	Northern Illinois	30–29
50	October 1, 2022	Muncie, IN	Ball State	44–38^{2OT}
51	November 7, 2023	DeKalb, IL	Ball State	20–17
52	October 26, 2024	Muncie, IN	Ball State	25–23
53	October 25, 2025	DeKalb, IL	Northern Illinois	21–7
Series: Northern Illinois leads 26–25–2

== See also ==
- List of NCAA college football rivalry games
