= 1975 Chattanooga Moccasins football team =

American college football season

1975 Chattanooga Moccasins football
- Conference: Independent
- Record: 5–5–1
- Head coach: Joe Morrison (3rd season)
- Home stadium: Chamberlain Field

1975 NCAA Division II independents football records
	Conf.			Overall
Team	W	L	T	W		L		T
No. 2 Northern Michigan ^		–		13	–	1	–	0
American International		–		8	–	1	–	0
Lehigh ^		–		9	–	3	–	0
Delaware		–		8	–	3	–	0
Portland State		–		8	–	3	–	0
Akron		–		7	–	4	–	0
Kentucky State		–		7	–	4	–	0
UNLV		–		7	–	4	–	0
Santa Clara		–		6	–	5	–	0
Tennessee State		–		5	–	4	–	0
Youngstown State		–		5	–	4	–	0
Chattanooga		–		5	–	5	–	1
Bucknell		–		5	–	5	–	0
Indiana State		–		5	–	5	–	0
Lafayette		–		5	–	5	–	0
Southern Connecticut State		–		5	–	5	–	0
Central Connecticut		–		4	–	5	–	0
Central State (OH)		–		4	–	6	–	0
Eastern Michigan		–		4	–	6	–	0
Eastern Illinois		–		3	–	5	–	2
Illinois College		–		3	–	6	–	0
Northeastern		–		3	–	6	–	0
Western Carolina		–		3	–	7	–	0
Nevada		–		3	–	8	–	0
Nebraska–Omaha		–		2	–	9	–	0
Arkansas–Pine Bluff		–		0	–	11	–	0
^ – NCAA Division II playoff participant; Rankings from AP Poll

The 1975 Chattanooga Moccasins football team was an American football team that represented the University of Tennessee at Chattanooga during the 1975 NCAA Division II football season. In their third year under head coach Joe Morrison, the team compiled a 5–5–1 record.

== Schedule ==
Date	Opponent	Site	Result	Attendance	Source
September 13	at Vanderbilt	Dudley Field; Nashville, TN	L 7–17	24,108	
September 20	Eastern Kentucky	Chamberlain Field; Chattanooga, TN	T 10–10	8,200	
September 27	at Jacksonville State	Paul Snow Stadium; Jacksonville, AL	L 6–24	8,500–8,950	
October 4	Middle Tennessee	Chamberlain Field; Chattanooga, TN	W 27–6	8,500	
October 11	at Louisville	Cardinal Stadium; Louisville, KY	L 3–6	9,056	
October 18	at East Tennessee State	Memorial Stadium; Johnson City, TN	W 21–13	4,536	
October 25	Western Carolina^{†}	Chamberlain Field; Chattanooga, TN	W 27–6	6,722	
November 1	at Arkansas State	Indian Stadium; Jonesboro, AR	L 0–48	14,621	
November 8	Tennessee State	Chamberlain Field; Chattanooga, TN	W 31–6	10,501	
November 15	at Louisiana Tech	Joe Aillet Stadium; Ruston, LA	L 20–49	13,200	
November 22	The Citadel	Chamberlain Field; Chattanooga, TN	W 24–6	6,007	
^{†}Homecoming
