= 1975 Delaware Fightin' Blue Hens football team =

American college football season

1975 Delaware Fightin' Blue Hens football
- Conference: Independent
- Record: 8–3
- Head coach: Tubby Raymond (10th season)
- Offensive coordinator: Ted Kempski (8th season)
- Offensive scheme: Delaware Wing-T
- Base defense: 5–2
- Home stadium: Delaware Stadium

1975 NCAA Division II independents football records
	Conf.			Overall
Team	W	L	T	W		L		T
No. 2 Northern Michigan ^		–		13	–	1	–	0
American International		–		8	–	1	–	0
Lehigh ^		–		9	–	3	–	0
Delaware		–		8	–	3	–	0
Portland State		–		8	–	3	–	0
Akron		–		7	–	4	–	0
Kentucky State		–		7	–	4	–	0
UNLV		–		7	–	4	–	0
Santa Clara		–		6	–	5	–	0
Tennessee State		–		5	–	4	–	0
Youngstown State		–		5	–	4	–	0
Chattanooga		–		5	–	5	–	1
Bucknell		–		5	–	5	–	0
Indiana State		–		5	–	5	–	0
Lafayette		–		5	–	5	–	0
Southern Connecticut State		–		5	–	5	–	0
Central Connecticut		–		4	–	5	–	0
Central State (OH)		–		4	–	6	–	0
Eastern Michigan		–		4	–	6	–	0
Eastern Illinois		–		3	–	5	–	2
Northeastern		–		3	–	6	–	0
Western Carolina		–		3	–	7	–	0
Nevada		–		3	–	8	–	0
Nebraska–Omaha		–		2	–	9	–	0
Arkansas–Pine Bluff		–		0	–	11	–	0
^ – NCAA Division II playoff participant; Rankings from AP Poll

The 1975 Delaware Fightin' Blue Hens football team represented the University of Delaware as an independent during the 1975 NCAA Division II football season. They were led by Tubby Raymond, who was in his 10th season as head coach of the Fightin' Blue Hens. The team played its home games at Delaware Stadium in Newark, Delaware. They finished the season with a record of 8–3, but failed to qualify for the postseason.

== Schedule ==
Date	Opponent	Rank	Site	Result	Attendance	Source
September 13	at VMI		Alumni Memorial Field; Lexington, VA	W 10–9	8,800	
September 20	Wittenburg		Delaware Stadium; Newark, DE	L 8–14	20,132	
September 27	at New Hampshire	No. 9	Wildcat Stadium; Durham, NH	W 16–7	10,212	
October 4	Akron	No. 10	Delaware Stadium; Newark, DE	W 21–0	18,460–18,640	
October 11	Connecticut	No. 9	Delaware Stadium; Newark, DE	W 29–0	15,182	
October 18	Lehigh^{†}	No. 8	Delaware Stadium; Newark, DE (rivalry)	L 23–25	21,100–21,105	
October 25	Temple	No. 14	Delaware Stadium; Newark, DE	L 0–45	22,062	
November 1	at Villanova		Villanova Stadium; Villanova, PA (rivalry)	W 14–13	8,900	
November 8	Maine		Delaware Stadium; Newark, DE	W 35–9	18,361	
November 15	West Chester		Delaware Stadium; Newark, DE (rivalry)	W 35–7	18,488	
November 22	Indiana State		Delaware Stadium; Newark, DE	W 46–7	17,726	
^{†}Homecoming; Rankings from AP Poll released prior to the game
