= 1975 Kent State Golden Flashes football team =

American college football season

1975 Kent State Golden Flashes football
- Conference: Mid-American Conference
- Record: 4–7 (1–6 MAC)
- Head coach: Dennis Fitzgerald (1st season)
- Home stadium: Dix Stadium

1975 Mid-American Conference football standings
	Conf.					Overall
Team	W		L		T	W		L		T
No. 12 Miami (OH) $	6	–	0	–	0	11	–	1	–	0
Central Michigan	4	–	1	–	1	8	–	2	–	1
Ball State	4	–	2	–	0	9	–	2	–	0
Bowling Green	4	–	2	–	0	8	–	3	–	0
Ohio	3	–	3	–	1	5	–	5	–	1
Toledo	4	–	4	–	0	5	–	6	–	0
Northern Illinois	2	–	3	–	0	3	–	8	–	0
Kent State	1	–	6	–	0	4	–	7	–	0
Western Michigan	0	–	7	–	0	1	–	10	–	0
$ – Conference champion; Rankings from AP Poll

The 1975 Kent State Golden Flashes football team was an American football team that represented Kent State University in the Mid-American Conference (MAC) during the 1975 NCAA Division I football season. In their first season under head coach Dennis Fitzgerald, the Golden Flashes compiled a 4–7 record (1–6 against MAC opponents), finished in sixth place in the MAC, and were outscored by all opponents by a combined total of 289 to 202.

The team's statistical leaders included Dan Watkins with 916 rushing yards, Greg Kokal with 1,754 passing yards, and Kim Featsent with 563 receiving yards. Defensive back Cedric Brown was selected as a first-team All-MAC player.

Dennis Fitzgerald was hired as Kent State's head football coach in January 1975. Fitzgerald had been Kent State's defensive coordinator under Don James, who resigned in December 1974.

== Schedule ==
Date	Opponent	Site	Result	Attendance	Source
September 13	at Northeast Louisiana*	Brown Stadium; Monroe, LA	W 31–29	8,000	
September 20	Virginia Tech*	Dix Stadium; Kent, OH	W 17–11	13,871	
September 27	at Ohio	Peden Stadium; Athens, OH	L 21–23	14,022	
October 4	at Northern Illinois	Huskie Stadium; DeKalb, IL	L 15–38		
October 11	at Western Michigan	Waldo Stadium; Kalamazoo, MI	W 22–17		
October 18	vs. Bowling Green	Cleveland Stadium; Cleveland, OH (rivalry)	L 9–35		
October 25	Central Michigan	Dix Stadium; Kent, OH	L 8–17		
November 1	at West Virginia*	Mountaineer Field; Morgantown, WV	L 13–38	30,160	
November 8	Marshall*	Dix Stadium; Kent, OH	W 30–21	6,164	
November 15	No. 16 Miami (OH)	Dix Stadium; Kent, OH	L 8–27	14,162	
November 22	at Toledo	Glass Bowl; Toledo, OH	L 28–33	16,598	
*Non-conference game; Rankings from AP Poll released prior to the game
