= 1975 Tennessee State Tigers football team =

American college football season

1975 Tennessee State Tigers football
- Conference: Independent
- Record: 5–4
- Head coach: John Merritt (13th season)
- Home stadium: Hale Stadium

1975 NCAA Division II independents football records
| | Conf. | | | Overall |
| Team | W | L | T | W | | L | | T |
|---|---|---|---|---|---|---|---|---|
| No. 2 Northern Michigan ^ | | – | | 13 | – | 1 | – | 0 |
| American International | | – | | 8 | – | 1 | – | 0 |
| Lehigh ^ | | – | | 9 | – | 3 | – | 0 |
| Delaware | | – | | 8 | – | 3 | – | 0 |
| Portland State | | – | | 8 | – | 3 | – | 0 |
| Akron | | – | | 7 | – | 4 | – | 0 |
| Kentucky State | | – | | 7 | – | 4 | – | 0 |
| UNLV | | – | | 7 | – | 4 | – | 0 |
| Santa Clara | | – | | 6 | – | 5 | – | 0 |
| Tennessee State | | – | | 5 | – | 4 | – | 0 |
| Youngstown State | | – | | 5 | – | 4 | – | 0 |
| Chattanooga | | – | | 5 | – | 5 | – | 1 |
| Bucknell | | – | | 5 | – | 5 | – | 0 |
| Indiana State | | – | | 5 | – | 5 | – | 0 |
| Lafayette | | – | | 5 | – | 5 | – | 0 |
| Southern Connecticut State | | – | | 5 | – | 5 | – | 0 |
| Central Connecticut | | – | | 4 | – | 5 | – | 0 |
| Central State (OH) | | – | | 4 | – | 6 | – | 0 |
| Eastern Michigan | | – | | 4 | – | 6 | – | 0 |
| Eastern Illinois | | – | | 3 | – | 5 | – | 2 |
| Northeastern | | – | | 3 | – | 6 | – | 0 |
| Western Carolina | | – | | 3 | – | 7 | – | 0 |
| Nevada | | – | | 3 | – | 8 | – | 0 |
| Nebraska–Omaha | | – | | 2 | – | 9 | – | 0 |
| Arkansas–Pine Bluff | | – | | 0 | – | 11 | – | 0 |
^ – NCAA Division II playoff participant; Rankings from AP Poll

The 1975 Tennessee State Tigers football team represented Tennessee State University as an independent during the 1975 NCAA Division II football season. In their 13th year under head coach John Merritt, the team compiled an overall record of 5–4.

== Schedule ==
| Date | Opponent | Site | Result | Attendance | Source |
|---|---|---|---|---|---|
| September 6 | vs. Middle Tennessee | Dudley Field; Nashville, TN | W 21–14 | 18,500–19,000 | |
| September 13 | at Jackson State | Mississippi Veterans Memorial Stadium; Jackson, MS | L 0–43 | 23,000–25,000 | |
| September 20 | at Alabama A&M | Milton Frank Stadium; Huntsville, AL | W 21–7 | 9,000 | |
| October 11 | No. 1 Grambling State | Hale Stadium; Nashville, TN | L 25–28 | 17,000–18,200 | |
| October 18 | Virginia Union | Hale Stadium; Nashville, TN | W 14–7 | 3,500 | |
| October 25 | Florida A&M | Dudley Field; Nashville, TN | L 0–17 | 21,000 | |
| November 1 | Central State (OH) | Hale Stadium; Nashville, TN | W 21–9 | 9,500 | |
| November 8 | at Chattanooga | Chamberlain Field; Chattanooga, TN | L 6–31 | 10,501 | |
| November 15 | at Virginia State | Rogers Stadium; Ettrick, VA | W 31–14 | 5,500 | |
Rankings from AP Poll released prior to the game
