= Kelly/Shorts Stadium =

Football stadium in Mount Pleasant, Michigan

Kramer/Deromedi Field at Kelly/Shorts Stadium
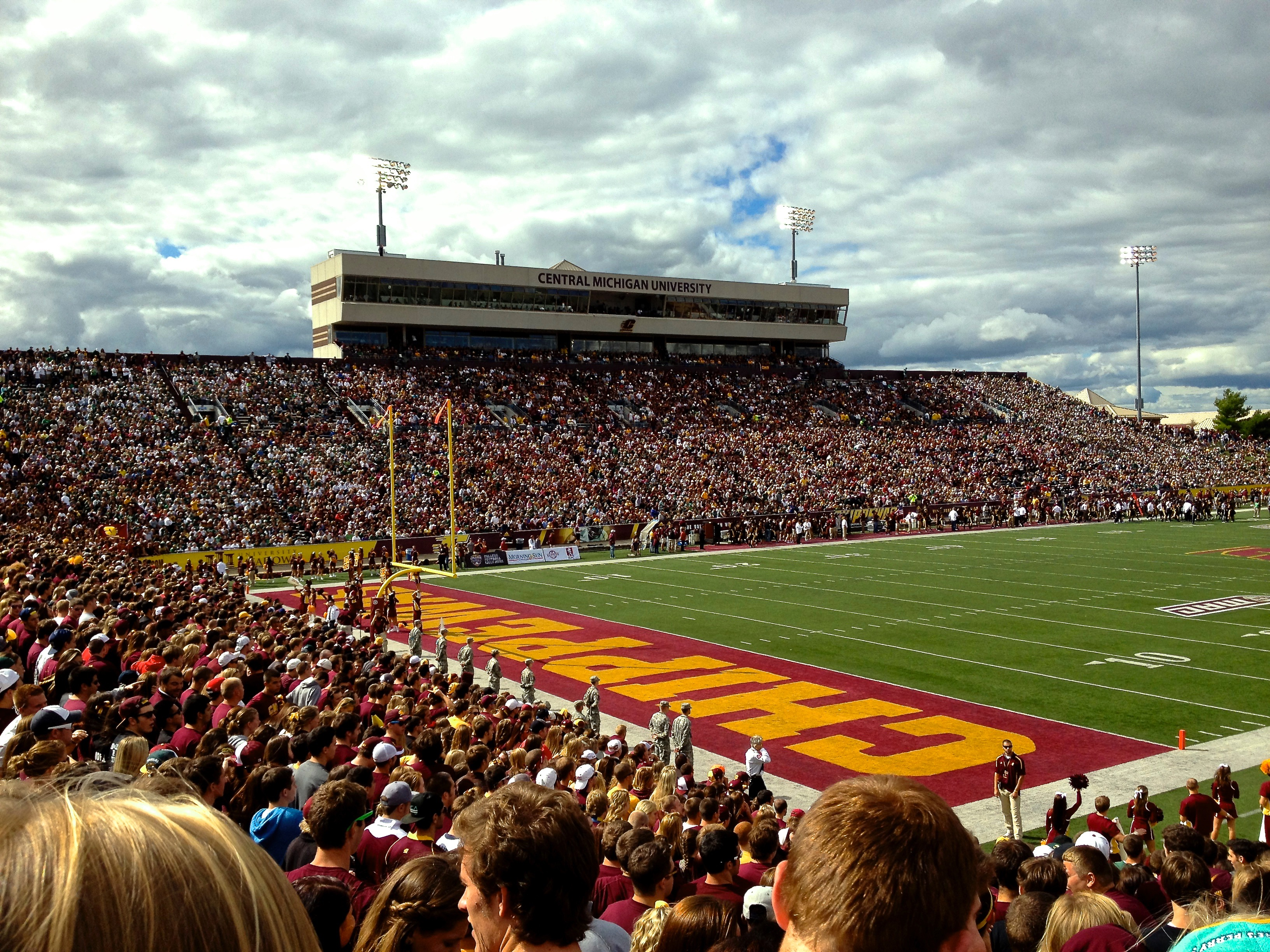
- Kelly/Shorts Stadium, 2012

- Location in Michigan Location in the United States
- Former names: Perry Shorts Stadium (1972–1982); Kelly/Shorts Stadium (1983-2022)
- Location: 2300 East Campus Drive; Mount Pleasant, MI 48858
- Coordinates: 43°34′39″N 84°46′15″W
- Owner: Central Michigan University
- Operator: Central Michigan University
- Capacity: 35,127 (2012–present); 30,199 (1998–2006); 20,000 (1972–1997)
- Surface: FieldTurf (2004–present); Astroturf (1972–2003)
- Record attendance: 35,127 (v. Michigan State University September 8, 2012)

Construction
- Groundbreaking: September, 1971
- Opened: November 4, 1972
- Expanded: 1998
- Cost: $2.2 million ($16.9 million in 2025 dollars)
- Architect: Hobbs+Black

Tenant
- Central Michigan Chippewas football (NCAA) (1972–present)

Kramer/Deromedi Field at Kelly/Shorts Stadium is an American football stadium in Mount Pleasant, Michigan. It serves as the home field for the Central Michigan University Chippewas. The stadium opened in 1972 and holds 35,127 spectators, making it the largest on-campus stadium in the Mid-American Conference. It is located on the southeast part of campus, along with most of the other athletic facilities. The playing surface is named Kramer/Deromedi Field after former coaches Roy Kramer and Herb Deromedi. It replaced Alumni Field, which was located directly east of Finch Fieldhouse and is now the site of the Finch-CMED Quad and the western wing of the Health Professions Building.

== History ==
The stadium was originally named Perry Shorts Stadium in honor of R. Perry Shorts, a Saginaw banker who was a 1900 graduate and a generous donor. The stadium, which originally seated approximately 20,000 spectators, was dedicated on November 4, 1972, when the Chippewas defeated Illinois State University, 28–21, before a Homecoming crowd of nearly 17,000. In June 1983, CMU's board of trustees voted to rename the facility Kelly/Shorts Stadium in honor of Kenneth "Bill" Kelly, who coached the Chippewa football team to a 91–58–2 record from 1951 to 1966.

=== Renovations ===
A $28 million expansion project following the 1997 season added 10,000 seats to the stadium, increasing its capacity to 30,199. A two-tiered press box, locker room, and nine guest suites also were included in the expansion project. The original artificial turf, the first to be used in the state of Michigan, has been replaced three times, most recently in 2016 when it was changed from Astroturf to FieldTurf. Permanent lights were installed before the 2006 season, making it the last stadium in the Mid-American Conference to do so.

== Features ==
CMU's locker room, training room and equipment room are located in the stadium's north end zone, and the locker room is connected to the Indoor Athletic Complex (IAC) via a tunnel. The IAC houses the Dick Enberg Academic Center, coaches' offices, weight room, meeting rooms, CMU's Hall of Champions and indoor practice field with a wall-to-wall FieldTurf surface.

== Events ==
The stadium has also been used as a site for other events, including high school football playoff games, concerts, and graduation ceremonies.

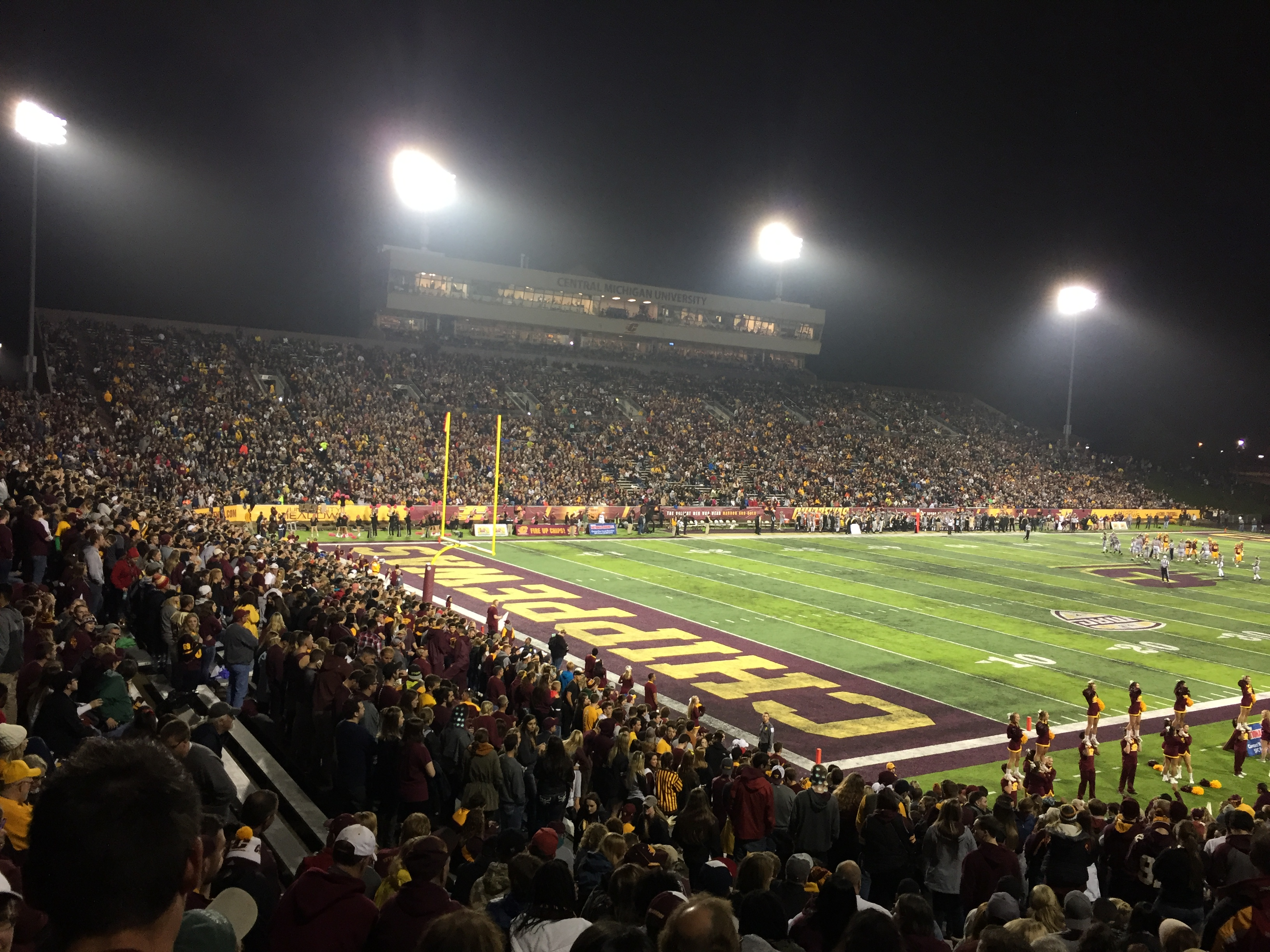
Night Game vs. Western Michigan, October 1, 2016.

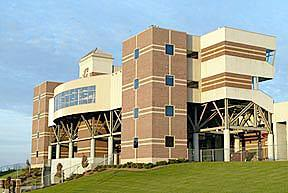
Press box from the West

== See also ==
- List of NCAA Division I FBS football stadiums
