= 1955 Michigan Intercollegiate Athletic Association football season =

- League: Michigan Intercollegiate Athletic Association
- Sport: Football
- Number of teams: 6
- Champion: Hillsdale

Football seasons
- ← 1954 1956 →

1955 Michigan Intercollegiate Athletic Association football standings
	Conf.					Overall
Team	W		L		T	W		L		T
Hillsdale $	6	–	0	–	0	9	–	0	–	0
Kalamazoo	4	–	2	–	0	5	–	3	–	0
Alma	3	–	3	–	0	5	–	4	–	0
Hope	3	–	3	–	0	4	–	5	–	0
Albion	3	–	3	–	0	3	–	5	–	0
Adrian	2	–	4	–	0	4	–	5	–	0
Olivet	0	–	6	–	0	1	–	8	–	0
$ – Conference champion

The 1955 Michigan Intercollegiate Athletic Association football season was the season of college football played by the six member schools of the Michigan Intercollegiate Athletic Association (MIAA) as part of the 1955 college football season.

The Hillsdale Dales, in their second season under head coach Muddy Waters, won the conference championship with a perfect 9–0 record (6–0 against MIAA opponents).

== Conference overview ==
Conf. rank	Team	Head coach	Conf. record	Overall record	Points scored	Points against
1	Hillsdale	Muddy Waters	6–0	9–0	302	86
2	Kalamazoo	Rolla Anderson	4–2	5–3	118	109
3 (tie)	Alma	Lloyd Eaton	3–3	5–4	187	141
3 (tie)	Hope	Russ DeVette	3–3	4–5	187	158
3 (tie)	Albion	Morley Fraser	3–3	3–5	99	125
6	Adrian	Joe Fortunato	2–4	4–5	139	186
7	Olivet	Warren Thomas	0–6	1–8	57	246

== Individual leaders ==
The MIAA individual leaders (limited to conference games unless stated otherwise) included:

- Scoring - Nate Clark, Hillsdale, 114 points in conference games (19 touchdowns); 144 points in all games (24 touchdowns)
- Rushing - Marv Raab, Alma, 672 yards on 78 carries
- Passing - Fred Hobart, Adrian, 26 of 52 attempts for 483 yards; John Holmlund, Hope, 445 yards
- Receiving - Leon Harper, Adrian, 20 receptions for 323 yards; Joe Iauch, Olivet, 23 receptions for 309 yards
- Total offense - Marv Raab, Alma, 683 yards (672 rushing yards, 11 passing yards); Rollie Wahl, Olivet, 658 yards

== Teams ==
=== Hillsdale ===
1955 Hillsdale Dales football

MIAA champion
- Conference: Michigan Intercollegiate Athletic Association
- Record: 9–0 (6–0 MIAA)
- Head coach: Muddy Waters (2nd season)

The 1955 Hillsdale Dales football team represented Hillsdale College in the MIAA during the 1955 college football season. In their second year under head coach Muddy Waters, the Dales compiled a 9–0 record (6–0 against MIAA opponents), won the MIAA championship, and outscored opponents by a total of 302 to 86. The season was part of Hillsdale's 34-game winning streak extending from 1954 to 1957.

The 1955 team declined an invitation to play in the 1956 Tangerine Bowl due to the organizers' stipulation that Hillsdale's four black players remain at home. One of the black players was Nate Clark who led the country in scoring with 144 points scored in nine games.

Date	Opponent	Site	Result	Source
September 17	Anderson (IN)*	Hillsdale, MI	W 42–7	
September 24	at Michigan State Normal*	Ypsilanti, MI	W 20–6	
October 1	Olivet	Hillsdale, MI	W 45–6	
October 8	at Albion	Albion, MI	W 14–7	
October 15	Alma	Hillsdale, MI	W 27–20	
October 22	at Hope	Holland, MI	W 19–13	
October 29	Kalamazoo	Hillsdale, MI	W 41–7	
November 5	at Adrian	Adrian, MI	W 62–7	
November 12	Lewis (IL)*	Hillsdale, MI	W 27–13	
*Non-conference game

=== Kalamazoo ===
1955 Kalamazoo Hornets football
- Conference: Michigan Intercollegiate Athletic Association
- Record: 5–3 (4–2 MIAA)
- Head coach: Rolla Anderson (3rd season)
- Home stadium: Angell Field

The 1955 Kalamazoo Hornets football team represented Kalamazoo College of Kalamazoo, Michigan. In their third year under head coach Rolla Anderson, the Hornets compiled a 5–3 record (4–2 against MIAA opponents), finished the season in second place in the MIAA, and outscored opponents by a total of 118 to 109.

Date	Time	Opponent	Site	Result	Source
September 24	2:00 p.m.	at Eastern Illinois*	Charleston, IL	L 0–15	
October 1		Alma	Kalamazoo, MI	L 6–15	
October 8		at Hope	Holland, MI	W 20–7	
October 15		Defiance	Kalamazoo, MI	W 20–12	
October 22		Adrian	Kalamazoo, MI	W 26–19	
October 29		at Hillsdale	Hillsdale, MI	L 7–41	
November 5		Olivet	Kalamazoo, MI	W 26–0	
November 12		at Albion	Albion, MI	W 13–0	
*Non-conference game

=== Alma ===
1955 Alma Scots football
- Conference: Michigan Intercollegiate Athletic Association
- Record: 5–4 (3–3 MIAA)
- Head coach: Lloyd Eaton (7th season)

The 1955 Alma Scots football team represented Alma College of Alma, Michigan. In their seventh and final year under head coach Lloyd Eaton, the Scots compiled a 5–4 record (3–3 against MIAA opponents), finished in a tie for third place in the MIAA, and outscored opponents by a total of 187 to 141.

Alma's Marv Raab led the MIAA in both rushing yards in conference games (672 yards on 78 carries) and total offense (683 yards).

Date	Opponent	Site	Result	Source
September 17	Indiana Central*	Alma, MI	W 20–0	
September 24	at Northern Michigan*	Marquette, MI	W 33–0	
October 1	at Kalamazoo	Kalamazoo, MI	W 15–6	
October 8	Adrian	Alma, MI	W 21–6	
October 15	at Hillsdale	Hillsdale, MI	L 20–27	
October 22	Olivet	Alma, MI	W 31–6	
October 29	at Albion	Albion, MI	L 13–20	
November 5	Ferris Institute*	Alma, MI	L 20–39	
November 12	Hope	Alma, MI	L 14–37	
*Non-conference game

=== Hope ===
1955 Hope Flying Dutchmen football
- Conference: Michigan Intercollegiate Athletic Association
- Record: 4–5 (3–3 MIAA)
- Head coach: Russ DeVette (1st season)

The 1955 Hope Flying Dutchmen football team represented Hope College of Hope, Michigan. In their first year under head coach Russ DeVette, the Dutchmen compiled a 4–5 record (3–3 against MIAA opponents), finished in a tie for third place in the MIAA, and outscored opponents by a total of 187 to 158.

Date	Opponent	Site	Result	Attendance	Source
September 17	at Michigan State Normal*	Briggs Field; Ypsilanti, MI	L 0–27		
September 24	Heidelberg*	Holland, MI	L 6–28		
October 1	Carroll*	Holland, MI	W 19–13		
October 8	Kalamazoo	Holland, MI	L 7–20		
October 15	at Adrian	Adrian, MI	L 13–18		
October 22	Hillsdale	Holland, MI	L 13–19		
October 29	at Olivet	Olivet, MI	W 52–13		
November 5	at Albion	Holland, MI	W 40–6	1,900	
November 12	at Alma	Alma, MI	W 37–14		
*Non-conference game

=== Albion ===
1955 Albion Britons football
- Conference: Michigan Intercollegiate Athletic Association
- Record: 3–5 (3–3 MIAA)
- Head coach: Morley Fraser (2nd season)

The 1955 Albion Britons football team represented Albion College of Albion, Michigan. In their second year under head coach Morley Fraser, the Britons compiled a 3–5 record (3–3 against MIAA opponents), finished in a tie for third place in the MIAA, and were outscored by a total of 135 to 99.

Date	Opponent	Site	Result	Attendance	Source
September 24	at Wabash*	Ingalls Field; Crawfordsville, IN	L 7–13		
October 1	at Adrian	Adrian, MI	W 13–7		
October 8	Hillsdale	Albion, MI	L 7–14		
October 15	at Olivet	Olivet, MI	W 26–7		
October 22	Beloit*	Albion, MI	L 20–28		
October 29	Alma	Albion, MI	W 20–13		
November 5	at Hope	Holland, MI	L 6–40	1,900	
November 12	Kalamazoo	Albion, MI	L 0–13		
*Non-conference game

=== Adrian ===
1955 Adrian Bulldogs football
- Conference: Michigan Intercollegiate Athletic Association
- Record: 4–5 (2–4 MIAA)
- Head coach: Joe Fortunato (3rd season)

The 1955 Adrian Bulldogs football team represented Adrian College of Adrian, Michigan. In their third and final year under head coach Joe Fortunato, the Bulldogs compiled a 4–5 record (2–4 against MIAA opponents), finished in sixth place in the MIAA, and were outscored by a total of 186 to 139.

Two Adrian players ranked as statistical leaders in conference games. Fred Hobart led the conference with 483 passing yards, and Leon Harper was the receiving leader with 20 receptions for 323 yards.

Date	Opponent	Site	Result	Source
September 17	Wilmington (OH)*	Adrian, MI	W 22–19	
September 24	Defiance*	Adrian, MI	W 25–12	
October 1	Albion	Adrian, MI	L 7–13	
October 8	at Alma	Alma, MI	L 6–21	
October 15	Hope	Adrian, MI	W 18–13	
October 22	at Kalamazoo	Kalamazoo, MI	L 19–26	
October 29	Ferris Institute*	Adrian, MI	L 15–20	
November 5	Hillsdale	Adrian, MI	L 7–62	
November 12	at Olivet	Olivet, MI	W 20–0	
*Non-conference game

=== Olivet ===
1955 Olivet Comets football
- Conference: Michigan Intercollegiate Athletic Association
- Record: 1–8 (0–6 MIAA)
- Head coach: Warren Thomas (3rd season)

The 1955 Olivet Comets football team represented Olivet College of Olivet, Michigan. In their third and final year under head coach Warren Thomas, the Comets compiled a 1–8 record (0–6 against MIAA opponents), finished in last place in the MIAA, and were outscored by a total of 246 to 57.

Date	Opponent	Site	Result	Source
September 17	at Wittenberg*	Springfield, OH	L 0–28	
September 24	at Ferris Institute*	Big Rapids, MI	L 6–12	
October 1	at Hillsdale	Hillsdale, MI	L 6–45	
October 8	Grand Rapids JC*	Olivet, MI	W 19–6	
October 15	Albion	Olivet, MI	L 7–26	
October 22	at Alma	Alma, MI	L 6–31	
October 29	Hope	Olivet, MI	L 13–52	
November 5	at Kalamazoo	Kalamazoo, MI	L 0–26	
November 12	Adrian	Olivet, MI	L 0–20	
*Non-conference game
