= Jim Harkema =

American football player and coach (born 1942)

Biographical details
- Born: June 25, 1942 (age 84)
- Education: Kalamazoo College (1964)

Playing career
- 1960–1963: Kalamazoo
- Position: Quarterback

Coaching career (HC unless noted)
- 1964–1965: Gull Lake HS (MI)
- 1966: Western Michigan (GA)
- 1967–1969: Niles East HS (IL)
- 1970–1971: Triton
- 1972: Northern Illinois (assistant)
- 1973–1982: Grand Valley State
- 1983–1992: Eastern Michigan

Head coaching record
- Overall: 109–86–6 (college); 11–4–2 (junior college)
- Bowls: 1–0
- Tournaments: 1–1 (NAIA D-I playoffs)

Accomplishments and honors

Championships
- 3 GLIAC (1977–1978, 1981); 1 MAC (1987)

Awards
- MAC Coach of the Year (1987)

Elson James Harkema (born June 25, 1942) is an American former college football player and coach. He served as the head football coach at Grand Valley State University in Allendale, Michigan from 1973 to 1982 and at Eastern Michigan University from 1983 to 1992, compiling a career college football record of 109–86–6. Harkema played college football as a quarterback at Kalamazoo College.

== Early life, education, and playing career ==
Harkema attended Owosso High School in Owosso, Michigan, where he played football, basketball, and tennis. He then matriculated at Kalamazoo College, where earned a total of ten varsity letters in those same three sports, and graduated in 1964 with a major in economics and a minor in physical education. Harkema earned a master's degree in 1967 from Western Michigan University.

== Coaching career ==
=== Grand Valley State ===
Harkema was the head coach of the Grand Valley State Lakers football team from 1973 through the 1982 season, compiling a record of 68–29–1 with winning seasons in nine of his ten years. In the 1978 season, his team qualified for the NAIA Football National Championship and won their quarterfinal playoff game against Wisconsin–La Crosse, but lost in the semifinals against Elon. The air option was pioneered by Homer Rice, a former head coach for Cincinnati. Harkema brought the air option offense to Grand Valley State in 1979.

=== Eastern Michigan ===
In 1982, following the team's 22nd consecutive loss, Mike Stock was fired as head coach of the Eastern Michigan Hurons football team. Assistant coach Bob LaPointe was named the interim head coach for the remainder of the season while the school conducted a national search, and Harkema was hired to lead the team beginning in 1983. Harkema again instilled the air option offense for Eastern Michigan. Beginning in 1986, Harkema led the team to four consecutive winning seasons, including Eastern's only Mid-American Conference championship and only 10-win season in 1987, when the team went to the 1987 California Bowl and upset 17½ point favorite San Jose State University for the only bowl game win in school history. Harkema is credited with building the program at Eastern Michigan into a "Top-Shelf" program, and he coached one of just two EMU games at Rynearson Stadium that sold-out: a 24–31 loss to Western Michigan on October 22, 1988 drew 23,003 (listed capacity at the time was 22,227), and a 0–0 tie against Eastern Kentucky on October 16, 1971 drew 17,360 (listed capacity at the time was 15,500).

The football team struggled with the beginning of the 1990s and after losing the first four games of the 1992 season, Harkema resigned, and assistant coach Jan Quarless took over for the remainder of the season.

In total, Harkema was the head coach at Eastern Michigan for ten seasons, from 1983 until 1992. His coaching record at Eastern Michigan was 41–57–5 (.422).

== Head coaching record ==
=== College ===
| Year | Team | Overall | Conference | Standing | Bowl/playoffs |
|---|---|---|---|---|---|
Grand Valley State (Great Lakes Intercollegiate Athletic Conference) (1973–1982)
| 1973 | Grand Valley State | 6–3 | 0–2 | 3rd | |
| 1974 | Grand Valley State | 6–3 | 1–2 | T–3rd | |
| 1975 | Grand Valley State | 7–2–1 | 3–1–1 | T–2nd | |
| 1976 | Grand Valley State | 8–2 | 3–2 | T–2nd | |
| 1977 | Grand Valley State | 7–3 | 4–1 | 1st | |
| 1978 | Grand Valley State | 9–3 | 5–0 | 1st | L NAIA Division I Semifinal |
| 1979 | Grand Valley State | 4–5 | 2–3 | 4th | |
| 1980 | Grand Valley State | 7–3 | 4–2 | T–2nd | |
| 1981 | Grand Valley State | 7–2 | 6–0 | 1st | |
| 1982 | Grand Valley State | 7–3 | 5–1 | 2nd | |
| Grand Valley State: | | 68–29–1 | 33–14–1 | | |
Eastern Michigan Hurons/Eagles (Mid-American Conference) (1983–1992)
| 1983 | Eastern Michigan | 1–10 | 0–9 | 10th | |
| 1984 | Eastern Michigan | 2–7–2 | 2–5–2 | 10th | |
| 1985 | Eastern Michigan | 4–7 | 3–6 | T–6th | |
| 1986 | Eastern Michigan | 6–5 | 4–4 | T–5th | |
| 1987 | Eastern Michigan | 10–2 | 7–1 | 1st | W California |
| 1988 | Eastern Michigan | 6–3–1 | 5–2–1 | 2nd | |
| 1989 | Eastern Michigan | 7–3–1 | 6–2 | T–2nd | |
| 1990 | Eastern Michigan | 2–9 | 2–6 | T–7th | |
| 1991 | Eastern Michigan | 3–7–1 | 3–4–1 | 7th | |
| 1992 | Eastern Michigan | 0–4 | 0–2 | | |
| Eastern Michigan: | | 41–57–5 | 32–41–4 | | |
| Total: | | 109–86–6 | | | |
National championship Conference title Conference division title or championship game berth
