= 1955 Hillsdale Dales football team =

American college football season

1955 Hillsdale Dales football

MIAA champion
- Conference: Michigan Intercollegiate Athletic Association
- Record: 9–0 (6–0 MIAA)
- Head coach: Muddy Waters (2nd season)

1955 Michigan Intercollegiate Athletic Association football standings
	Conf.					Overall
Team	W		L		T	W		L		T
Hillsdale $	6	–	0	–	0	9	–	0	–	0
Kalamazoo	4	–	2	–	0	5	–	3	–	0
Alma	3	–	3	–	0	5	–	4	–	0
Hope	3	–	3	–	0	4	–	5	–	0
Albion	3	–	3	–	0	3	–	5	–	0
Adrian	2	–	4	–	0	4	–	5	–	0
Olivet	0	–	6	–	0	1	–	8	–	0
$ – Conference champion

The 1955 Hillsdale Dales football team was an American football team that represented Hillsdale College in the Michigan Intercollegiate Athletic Association (MIAA) during the 1955 college football season. In their second year under head coach Muddy Waters, the Dales compiled a 9–0 record (6–0 against MIAA opponents), won the MIAA championship, and outscored opponents by a total of 302 to 86. The season was part of Hillsdale's 34-game winning streak extending from 1954 to 1957.

The 1955 team declined an invitation to play in the 1956 Tangerine Bowl due to the organizers' stipulation that Hillsdale's four black players remain at home. One of the black players was Nate Clark who led the country in scoring with 144 points scored in nine games.

== Schedule ==
Date	Opponent	Site	Result	Source
September 17	Anderson (IN)*	Hillsdale, MI	W 42–7	
September 24	at Michigan State Normal*	Ypsilanti, MI	W 20–6	
October 1	Olivet	Hillsdale, MI	W 45–6	
October 8	at Albion	Albion, MI	W 14–7	
October 15	Alma	Hillsdale, MI	W 27–20	
October 22	at Hope	Holland, MI	W 19–13	
October 29	Kalamazoo	Hillsdale, MI	W 41–7	
November 5	at Adrian	Adrian, MI	W 62–7	
November 12	Lewis (IL)*	Hillsdale, MI	W 27–13	
*Non-conference game

== Clark leads the nation in scoring ==
Halfback Nate Clark rushed for 949 yards and led all of college football with 144 points (24 touchdowns) scored in nine games. His 144 points led small college football by 36 points over the second-highest scorer. It was also the highest point total scored by a football player in Michigan since Willie Heston in the early 1900s. At the end of the season, Clark was selected by the Associated Press as a first-team back on the 1955 Little All-America college football team.

== The Tangerine Bowl bid ==
In the 1950s, the Tangerine Bowl, played on New Year's Day, matched the best small-college teams in the country. However, the Tangerine Bowl was played in Florida and was a whites-only game. A racially integrated team had never been invited to participate. Coach Waters and other Hillsdale officials lobbied the bowl organizer to break the race barrier and invite the undefeated Hillsdale team to play in the January 2 bowl game.

The team ultimately received an invitation to play in the 1956 Tangerine Bowl, but the organizers stipulated that Hillsdale would have to leave its black players at home. Waters put the matter to a vote, and the players decided unanimously to decline the invitation. Clark later recalled: "I felt bad for the team because it deprived them of the opportunity to play in the bowl, but I was proud of the guys who made the decision because we couldn't go as a team."

Tangerine Bowl officials sought to save face by issuing a public statement that Hillsdale had not been invited because they were "too strong" to play against other teams being considered.

== A Better Kind of Glory ==
In 2021, Hillsdale students, as part of a video-story telling class directed by Emmy-nominated journalist Buddy Moorehouse, produced a documentary titled, A Better Kind of Glory, telling the story of the 1955 team's decision not to participate in the Tangerine Bowl. The film opens with these words:

This is the story of a football team that gave up their success on the field to preserve the dignity of their brothers off the field. This is the story of a group of young men who placed love for their teammates above the opportunity of a lifetime. This is the story of the 1955 Hillsdale College football team that chose a better kind of glory.

When A Better Kind of Glory premiered, Michigan Governor Gretchen Whitmer and Lieutenant Governor Garlin Gilchrist signed a document honoring the 1955 team for its "outstanding athletic achievements and its dedication to the American principles of liberty and justice for all."
