= Steve Myhra =

American football player (1934–1994)

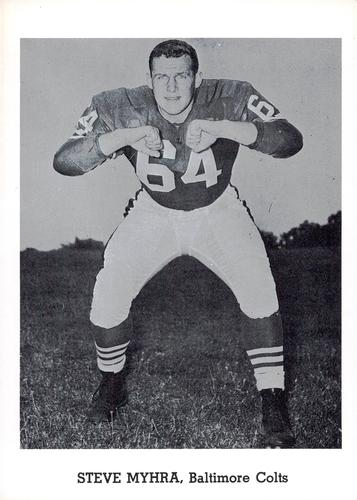

No. 64, 65
- Positions: Guard, linebacker, placekicker

Personal information
- Born: April 2, 1934; Wahpeton, North Dakota, U.S.
- Died: August 4, 1994 (aged 60); Detroit Lakes, Minnesota, U.S.
- Listed height: 6 ft 1 in (1.85 m)
- Listed weight: 237 lb (108 kg)

Career information
- High school: Wahpeton
- College: Minnesota; North Dakota
- NFL draft: 1956: 12th round, 139th overall pick

Career history
- Baltimore Colts (1957–1961); Saskatchewan Roughriders (1962)

Awards and highlights
- 2× NFL champion (1958, 1959); First-team Little All-American (1955); First-team Little All-American (1956); North Central Conference MVP (1956)

Career NFL statistics
- Games played: 62
- Games started: 4
- Field goal attempts: 91
- Field goals made: 44
- Stats at Pro Football Reference

Steve Myhra (/ˈmaɪrə/ MY-rə; April 2, 1934 – August 4, 1994) was an American professional football player who a kicker, guard, and linebacker for five seasons with the Baltimore Colts of the National Football League (NFL).

Myhra played college football for the Minnesota Golden Gophers before transferring to the North Dakota Fighting Sioux (now Fighting Hawks) in 1955 to play his final two seasons. He was named by the Associated Press to the 1955 and 1956 Little All-America first teams and was voted Most Valuable Player of the North Central Conference by the league's coaches in 1956.

Myhra is best remembered for a critical field goal made with 7 seconds remaining in the 1958 NFL Championship Game that forced the first sudden death overtime in NFL history in what became known as "The Greatest Game Ever Played."

== Biography ==
=== Early life ===
Steve Myhra was born April 2, 1934 in Wahpeton, North Dakota. He attended Wahpeton High School, where he was a three sport athlete, playing football, basketball, and track and field.

Myhra was a pitcher on the North Dakota State Champion American Legion baseball team and was an avid hunter in his free time.

=== College career ===
Myhra initially attended the University of Minnesota, where he studied agriculture, with plans of becoming a farmer after graduation. He was also active on the school football team, playing tackle on the freshman squad in 1952.

Myhra was promoted to the varsity team for the 1953 season and was immediately touted by coaches as a potential future All-Big 10 prospect. Although undersized for the position by modern standards, the year 1953 saw a return to the single platoon system of limited substitutions, in which players played both sides of the ball — a change which once again caused coaches to place a premium on versatility and endurance rather than size and bulk. Myhra was well regarded and made part of the Minnesota traveling team, beginning the season as the team's third string left tackle.

The 1953 season would be Myhra's last at Minnesota, as he transferred home to the University of North Dakota. He sat out the 1954 football season in accordance with NCAA rules, becoming eligible for football again in 1955. He did participate on the NDU track and field team in the spring of 1955, specializing in the power sports of shot put and discus.

Myhra was ready to resume his collegiate football career in the fall of 1955. Blessed with outstanding speed for his size, Myhra saw extensive time playing guard — a position for which mobility was particularly valued.

Myhra's exceptional quickness attracted the eye of Sports Illustrated journalist Herman Hickman, who wrote:

"Myhra, a 225-pound transfer from Minnesota, must be regarded as one of the fine linemen of the year. He turned out this year to play tackle but because of his tremendous speed — Coach Frank Zazula says he has timed him in 10.6 [seconds] in full football uniform for the hundred — he moved to an offensive guard.... Zazula is particularly impressed with his initial charge and his ability to hit and recover and move quickly to whatever area appears crucial to the play."

Myhra's national profile was further enhanced when he was named to the AP Little All-American first team. He was also named a first team All-American by the Williamson National Rating Service for its "mid-bracket" squad.

Myhra was selected in the 12th round of the 1956 NFL draft (139th pick overall) by the Colts as an offensive guard. The Colts were particularly concerned with bolstering their line in 1956, going so far as to draft Ohio State University behemoth Jim Parker, a future member of the Professional Football Hall of Fame, in the first round with the eighth overall pick.

Despite having been already selected in the 1956 NFL draft, Myhra elected to return to North Dakota and head coach Zazula for his senior season. It was during this season that the hefty lineman — still playing college football in the era of limited substitution — began to make his mark as a field goal kicker.

Myhra's senior season was a good one. Although garnering somewhat less national attention, Myhra was nevertheless named the Most Valuable Player of the North Central Conference for 1956 by the league's coaches. He was also selected again to the Little All-America first team by the Associated Press, one of just four players accorded repeat honors in 1956.

=== Professional career ===
Steve Myhra lines up his game-tying 20-yard field goal with 7 seconds remaining, 1958 NFL Championship game.

The Colts would sign their 1956 "future" draft pick Steve Myhra for the 1957 season, which would be his rookie year. Myhra was seen by head coach Weeb Ewbank as a useful two-way utility player, able to provide competent reserve play as either a defensive linebacker or an offensive guard.

But it was as a kicker that Steve Myhra found his lasting place on the Colts roster. He first made his mark in a Week 8 game against the Chicago Bears, nailing a 41-yard fourth quarter field goal — a not insubstantial kick in the era of NFL football before the advent of "soccer-style" kicking specialists. He would finish his 1957 rookie season hitting on 14 of 16 extra point attempts, while going 4 for 6 on field goals.

The Colts would narrowly miss the Western Conference crown in 1957, dropping their final game in Los Angeles to the Rams and thereby forced to sit at home while the Detroit Lions and San Francisco 49ers met in a one-game playoff for the right to move to the 1957 NFL Championship Game.

Myhra is best-remembered for kicking the game-tying field goal for the Colts with seven seconds to go in the fourth quarter of the 1958 NFL Championship Game. Myhra's successful 20-yard kick pushed the contest into overtime, marking the first occasion in professional football history that a game had moved to a "sudden death" period. The game was eventually won by the Colts on a one-yard plunge for a winning touchdown by fullback Alan Ameche, concluding a game long-remembered in NFL lore as "The Greatest Game Ever Played." Myhra's kick would be popularized and immortalized in a cover photo on Life magazine.

Ironically, Myhra was far from a kicking superstar, finishing the 1958 season just 4-for-9 in his field goal duties for the Colts — with a season long of just 28-yards — while teammate Bert Rechichar went 1-for-4 attempting longer kicks.

Behind quarterback and field leader Johnny Unitas, the Colts would repeat as World Champions in the 1959 NFL Championship Game, with Myhra earning his second championship ring. Myhra's field goal percentage was once again unimpressive for the year, with just six makes in 17 attempts, but he would be rock-steady making points after touchdown, going 50-for-51 for the year.

Myhra would again show his limitations as a kicker in 1960, finishing the season going 9-for-19 from the field, with only one make in six attempts from 40 yards or more. Despite this shaky record, Myhra would finish the year with 60 points scored, second most on the club.

During the 1961 NFL season, his final year in the league, Myhra won the first three games of the year for the Colts with last second field goals. Far and away his best season as a kicker, Myhra would lead the Colts in scoring that year with 96 total points, powered by 21 field goals on 39 attempts. This included his career long kick, a 52-yarder.

Myhra finished his five-year career hitting 180 of 189 attempted extra points, and making 41 of 91 field goal tries (45.1%).

=== Later life, death, and legacy ===
After leaving the NFL following the 1961 season, Myhra returned to North Dakota, establishing a business in Fargo.

Steve Myhra will always be best remembered for his game-tying 1958 Championship Game field goal, despite the fact it was little more than a high-pressure 20-yard "chip shot." When former Giants and Colts players got together for a golfing reunion in 1980 at Winged Foot Golf Club in Mamaroneck, New York, Myhra was asked about his kick.

"Did that field goal change my life?" Myhra pondered. "Not really. Oh, I got $25 a speaking engagement over the winter, and I was bad." Myhra added that he had been confident of making the critical kick, remarking, "I think I was the only person who thought I'd make that field goal. [Head coach] Weeb [Ewbank] was scared shitless."

Myhra's recollection two decades after the fact seems correct, with Ewbank later saying of Myhra, "He couldn't kick at all. He even weaved back and forth on his way to the ball. If he kicked five field goals in practice, his footsteps would be all over the place. But he tied the game for us, just because we didn't have time to try to get into the end zone."

Myhra died of a heart attack in 1994 at age 60. Myhra had battled alcoholism during his post-football life but had "cleaned that up for the most part" by the time of his death, according to Garvin Stevens, a longtime friend. "He had some real struggles in life," Stevens recalled, while noting "but when someone as big and tough as Steve can tell you over the telephone that he loves you, as Steve did to me, you know he had a heart of gold."

Myhra was buried at Riverside Cemetery in Fargo.
