= 1978 Southwest Texas State Bobcats football team =

American college football season

1978 Southwest Texas State Bobcats football
- Conference: Lone Star Conference
- Record: 6–4 (3–4 LSC)
- Head coach: Bill Miller (14th season)
- Defensive coordinator: Bob Brush (2nd season)
- Home stadium: Evans Field

1978 Lone Star Conference football standings
	Conf.					Overall
Team	W		L		T	W		L		T
No. 1 Angelo State $^	7	–	0	–	0	14	–	0	–	0
No. 11 Abilene Christian	5	–	2	–	0	7	–	3	–	0
Sam Houston State	4	–	3	–	0	6	–	5	–	0
No. 20 Texas A&I	4	–	3	–	0	6	–	5	–	0
Southwest Texas State	3	–	4	–	0	6	–	4	–	0
Stephen F. Austin	3	–	4	–	0	3	–	8	–	0
East Texas State	2	–	3	–	0	4	–	7	–	0
Howard Payne	0	–	7	–	0	2	–	8	–	0
$ – Conference champion; ^ – NAIA Division I playoff participant; Rankings from NAIA Division I poll

The 1978 Southwest Texas State Bobcats football team was an American football team that represented Southwest Texas State University (now known as Texas State University) during the 1978 NAIA Division I football season as a member of the Lone Star Conference (LSC). In their 14th year under head coach Bill Miller, the team compiled an overall record of 6–4, with a mark of 3–4 in conference play.

== Schedule ==
Date	Opponent	Site	Result	Attendance	Source
September 2	at Southeastern Louisiana*	Strawberry Stadium; Hammond, LA	W 7–0	6,500	
September 9	Texas Lutheran*	Evans Field; San Marcos, TX	W 14–0	8,133	
September 30	Howard Payne	Evans Field; San Marcos, TX	W 55–0	6,868	
October 7	vs. Prairie View A&M*	Alamo Stadium; San Antonio, TX	W 58–6	6,500	
October 14	at Sam Houston State	Pritchett Field; Huntsville, TX (rivalry)	L 16–21	9,100	
October 21	Stephen F. Austin	Evans Field; San Marcos, TX	W 9–0	6,511	
October 28	at East Texas State	Memorial Stadium; Commerce, TX	W 25–10	9,500	
November 4	Angelo State	Evans Field; San Marcos, TX	L 6–29	11,000	
November 11	Abilene Christian	Evans Field; San Marcos, TX	L 7–10	5,804	
November 18	at Texas A&I	Javelina Stadium; Kingsville, TX	L 21–48	8,500	
*Non-conference game
