= Michigan Tech Huskies football, 1970–1979 =

American college football seasons

1970–1979 Michigan Tech Huskies football
- Conference: Northern Intercollegiate Conference
- Head coach: Ted Kearly (1969–1972); Jim Kapp (1973–1980)

The Michigan Tech Huskies football program, 1970–1979 represented Michigan Technological University, known prior to 1965 as the Michigan College of Mines and Technology, as a member of the Northern Intercollegiate Conference (NIC). Ted Kearly was the head coach from 1969 to 1972; Jim Kapp took over the post from 1973 to 1980. Highlights included:

- The 1970 Michigan Tech Huskies football team compiled an 8–1 record and finished in a three-way tie for the NIC championship.
- The 1971 Michigan Tech Huskies football team compiled an 8–1 record and set a single-season school record with 382 points.
- The 1972 Michigan Tech Huskies football team compiled and 8–1 record and won an outright NIC championship.
- The 1974 Michigan Tech Huskies football team compiled a perfect 9–0 record and won the NIC championship.

== 1970 ==
1970 Michigan Tech Huskies football

NIC co-champion
- Conference: Northern Intercollegiate Conference
- Record: 8–1 (5–1 NIC)
- Head coach: Ted Kearly (2nd season)
- Defensive coordinator: Doug Graber (2nd season)

1970 Northern Intercollegiate Conference football standings
	Conf.					Overall
Team	W		L		T	W		L		T
Michigan Tech +	5	–	1	–	0	8	–	1	–	0
Minnesota Morris +	5	–	1	–	0	7	–	2	–	0
St. Cloud State +	5	–	1	–	0	6	–	3	–	0
Moorhead State	3	–	3	–	0	4	–	4	–	1
Winona State	1	–	5	–	0	2	–	7	–	0
Bemidji State	1	–	5	–	0	1	–	8	–	0
Southwest State (MN)	1	–	5	–	0	1	–	8	–	0
+ – Conference co-champions

The 1970 Michigan Tech Huskies football team represented Michigan Technological University as a member of the Northern Intercollegiate Conference (NIC) during the 1970 NCAA College Division football season. In their second season under head coach Ted Kearly, the Huskies compiled an 8–1 record (5–1 in conference games) and outscored opponents by a total of 221 to 63.

Michigan Tech tallied 1,668 rushing yards (185.3 per game) and 1,064 passing yards (118.2 per game). On defense, the Huskies gave up only 805 rushing yards (89.3 per game) and 702 passing yards (78.0 per game). The individual statistical leaders included:

- Junior halfback Larry Ras led the team in multiple statistical categories, including rushing (935 yards, 103.8 per game), total offense (935 yards), and scoring (66 points, 7.3 per game).
- Sophomore quarterback Ben Haller led the team in passing, completing 36 of 73 passes for 596 yards.
- Freshman split end Gene Timmer led the team with 15 receptions for 393 yards.
- Senior defensive halfback Jerry LaJeunesse led the team in punting with 39 puntss for an average of 37.0 yards per punt.

=== Schedule ===
Date	Opponent	Site	Result	Attendance	Source
September 12	Northland	Houghton, MI	W 27–0		
September 19	at Alma	Alma, MI	W 17–6		
September 26	Southwest State (MN)	Houghton, MI	W 22–0		
October 3	Ferris State	Houghton, MI	W 27–0		
October 10	at St. Cloud State	St. Cloud, MN	W 26–22		
October 17	Winona State	Houghton, MI	W 39–0		
October 24	at Bemidji State	Bemidji, MN	W 35–8		
October 31	Moorhead State	Houghton, MI	W 21–0		
November 7	at Minnesota-Morris	Morris, MN	L 7–27		

== 1971 ==
1971 Michigan Tech Huskies football
- Conference: Northern Intercollegiate Conference
- Record: 8–1 (5–1 NIC)
- Head coach: Ted Kearly (3rd season)
- Defensive coordinator: Doug Graber (3rd season)

1971 Northern Intercollegiate Conference football standings
	Conf.					Overall
Team	W		L		T	W		L		T
Moorhead State $	6	–	0	–	0	7	–	1	–	1
Michigan Tech	5	–	1	–	0	8	–	1	–	0
Minnesota Morris	3	–	2	–	1	4	–	4	–	1
Bemidji State	3	–	2	–	1	3	–	5	–	1
St. Cloud State	2	–	4	–	0	2	–	7	–	0
Winona State	1	–	5	–	0	1	–	9	–	0
Southwest State (MN)	0	–	6	–	0	0	–	10	–	0
$ – Conference champion

The 1971 Michigan Tech Huskies football team represented Michigan Technological University as a member of the Northern Intercollegiate Conference (NIC) during the 1971 NCAA College Division football season. In their third year under head coach Ted Kearly, the Huskies compiled an 8–1 record (5–1 in conference games), finished second in the NIC, and outscored opponents by a total of 382 to 97. Michigan Tech extended its home winning streak to 13 games dating back to the 1969 season.

The team's 382 points was the most in Michigan Tech history to that point. It remained the school record until the 1992 Michigan Tech Huskies football team scored 429 points. The team also set a school and NIC record with 642 yards of total offense in a 73-0 victory over Winona State on October 16, 1971. The 73 points scored against Winona was also a Michigan Tech record.

Senior halfback and tri-captain Larry Ras, a mechanical engineering major and a native of Hancock, Michigan, led the team with 1,403 rushing yards and 144 points scored. Ras's 144 points led the nation, and his 1,403 rushing yards ranked fifth in the NCAA College Division. He also set Michigan Tech's single game rushing record with 209 yards against Bemidji State, as well as the modern career rushing record for all of Michigan collegiate football with 3,761 yards. Michigan Tech coach Kearly proclaimed him "the best football player in Michigan Tech's history."

The 1971 Michigan Tech team tallied 2,844 rushing yards and 1,138 passing yards. Junior quarterback Michael Scally tallied 916 passing yards with 11 touchdowns and three interceptions. Split end Gene Timmer led the team in receiving with 21 catches for 539 yards and eight touchdowns.

=== Schedule ===
Date	Opponent	Site	Result	Attendance	Source
September 11	at Northland	Ashland, WI	W 54–0	1,500	
September 18	Alma	Houghton, MI	W 28–13	2,500	
September 25	at Southwest Minnesota	Marshall, MN	W 40–7	2,000	
October 2	at Ferris State	Big Rapids, MI	W 39–13	6,000	
October 9	St. Cloud State	Houghton, MI	W 40–28	3,000	
October 16	at Winona State	Winona, MN	W 73–0	2,500	
October 23	Bemidji State	Houghton, MI	W 70–20	3,500	
October 30	at Moorhead State	Moorhead, MN	L 0–6	1,750	
November 6	Minnesota Morris		W 39–10	1,550	

== 1972 ==
1972 Michigan Tech Huskies football

NIC champion
- Conference: Northern Intercollegiate Conference
- Record: 8–1 (6–0 NIC)
- Head coach: Ted Kearly (4th season)

1972 Northern Intercollegiate Conference football standings
	Conf.					Overall
Team	W		L		T	W		L		T
Michigan Tech $	6	–	0	–	0	8	–	1	–	0
Minnesota Morris	5	–	1	–	0	8	–	2	–	0
Moorhead State	4	–	2	–	0	7	–	3	–	0
St. Cloud State	3	–	3	–	0	5	–	5	–	0
Southwest State (MN)	2	–	4	–	0	3	–	7	–	0
Bemidji State	1	–	5	–	0	2	–	7	–	0
Winona State	0	–	6	–	0	2	–	7	–	0
$ – Conference champion

The 1972 Michigan Tech Huskies football team represented Michigan Technological University as a member of the Northern Intercollegiate Conference (NIC) during the 1972 NCAA College Division football season. In their fourth and final season under head coach Ted Kearly, the Huskies compiled an 8–1 record (6–0 in conference games) and outscored opponents by a total of 261 to 98.

=== Schedule ===
Date	Opponent	Site	Result	Attendance	Source
September 16	at Northwood	Midland, MI	L 6–24		
September 23	Northland	Houghton, MI	W 24–19		
September 30	Ferris State	Houghton, MI	W 41–20		
October 7	at St. Cloud State	St. Cloud, MI	W 33–14		
October 14	Winona State	Houghton, MI	W 41–6		
October 21	at Bemidji State	Bemidji, MN	W 21–15		
October 28	Moorhead State	Houghton, MI	W 7–0		
November 4	at Minnesota-Morris	Morris, MN	W 17–0		
November 11	Southwest State	Houghton, MI	W 71–0		

== 1973 ==
1973 Michigan Tech Huskies football
- Conference: Northern Intercollegiate Conference
- Record: 5–4–1 (4–2 NIC)
- Head coach: Jim Kapp (1st season)

1973 Northern Intercollegiate Conference football standings
	Conf.					Overall
Team	W		L		T	W		L		T
Moorhead State $	5	–	1	–	0	7	–	3	–	0
Michigan Tech	4	–	2	–	0	5	–	4	–	1
St. Cloud State	4	–	2	–	0	4	–	6	–	0
Bemidji State	2	–	4	–	0	5	–	4	–	0
Southwest State (MN)	2	–	4	–	0	4	–	6	–	0
Minnesota Morris	2	–	4	–	0	3	–	6	–	0
Winona State	2	–	4	–	0	3	–	7	–	0
$ – Conference champion

The 1973 Michigan Tech Huskies football team represented Michigan Technological University as a member of the Northern Intercollegiate Conference (NIC) during the 1973 NCAA Division II football season. In their first season under head coach Jim Kapp, the Huskies compiled a 5–4–1 record (4–2 in conference games), tied for second place in the NIC, and outscored opponents by a total of 208 to 151.

=== Schedule ===
Date	Opponent	Site	Result	Attendance	Source
September 8	Northwood	Houghton, MI	W 17–7		
September 15	Minnesota-Duluth	Houghton, MI	L 0–7		
September 22	at Northland	Ashland, WI	L 14–16		
September 29	at Ferris State	Big Rapids, MI	T 14–14		
October 6	St. Cloud State	Houghton, MI	W 34–28		
October 13	at Winona State	Winona, MN	L 21–26		
October 20	Bemidji State	Houghton, MI	W 38–6		
October 27	at Moorhead State	Moorhead, MN	L 10–14		
November 3	Minnesota-Morris	Houghton, MI	W 46–20		
November 10	Southwest State (MN)	Marshall, MN	W 14–13		

== 1974 ==
1974 Michigan Tech Huskies football

NIC champion
- Conference: Northern Intercollegiate Conference
- Record: 9–0 (6–0 NIC)
- Head coach: Jim Kapp (2nd season)
- Home stadium: Sherman Field

1974 Northern Intercollegiate Conference football standings
	Conf.					Overall
Team	W		L		T	W		L		T
Michigan Tech $	6	–	0	–	0	9	–	0	–	0
St. Cloud State	5	–	1	–	0	5	–	5	–	0
Winona State	3	–	3	–	0	5	–	4	–	0
Moorhead State	3	–	3	–	0	4	–	5	–	0
Southwest State (MN)	2	–	4	–	0	4	–	5	–	0
Minnesota Morris	2	–	4	–	0	3	–	7	–	0
Bemidji State	0	–	6	–	0	2	–	7	–	0
$ – Conference champion

The 1974 Michigan Tech Huskies football team represented Michigan Technological University as a member of the Northern Intercollegiate Conference (NIC) during the 1974 National Association of Intercollegiate Athletics NAIA season. In their second year under head coach Jim Kapp, the Huskies compiled a perfect 9–0 record, won the NIC championship, and outscored opponents by a total of 269 to 90. It was Michigan Tech's first perfect season since the 1948 team went 7–0. It was also the program's first nine-win season, and its fourth NIC championship in six years.

The team played its home games on Sherman Field in Houghton, Michigan.

=== Schedule ===
Date	Opponent	Site	Result	Attendance	Source
September 7	at Northwood*	Midland, MI	W 15–13	1,500	
September 14	at Alma*	Alma, MI	W 21–10	2,500	
September 21	at St. Cloud State	St. Cloud, MN	W 3–0	3,000	
September 28	Winona State	Sherman Field; Houghton, MI	W 32–21	2,500	
October 5	at Bemidji State	Bemidji, MN	W 62–6	3,250	
October 12	Moorhead State	Sherman Field; Houghton, MI	W 19–0	3,800	
October 19	at Minnesota Morris	Morris, MN	W 24–12	2,300	
October 26	Southwest State (MN)	Sherman Field; Houghton, MN	W 76–28	2,700	
November 2	Ferris State*	Sherman Field; Houghton, MI	W 17–0	2,100	
*Non-conference game

=== Records and awards ===
In a 76–28 victory over Southwest State (MN), the Huskies set several NIC single-game records, including total offense (670 yards), rushing yards (511), touchdowns (11), and points (76). Van Wagner also established new individual single-game records against Southwest State with 286 rushing yards and six touchdowns.

Jim Van Wagner, a 195-pound sophomore tailback from Novi, Michigan, led the team with 1,452 rushing yards, breaking Michigan Tech's single-season record set by Larry Ras in 1971. He led all Division II players with an average of 161.4 rushing yards per game. Sports Illustrated wrote of Van Wagner:

As a soph in 1974 he led Division II in rushing with 1,453 yards. Archie Griffin and Anthony Davis made national headlines, but that November VanWagner had perhaps the most productive month a running back ever had. He gained 231 yards in just 16 carries against Bemidji, rushed a conference record 48 times for 217 yards in a win over Minnesota-Morris that clinched the Northern Intercollegiate Conference title and then rambled through Southwest State for 286 yards and six touchdowns in 30 carries.

After the season, Jim Kapp was named "NIC Football Coach of the Year", and six Michigan Tech players received first-team honors on the 1974 All-NIC team selected by the conference coaches. The first-team players were: sophomore tailback Jim Van Wagner; senior fullback Keith Morrison; senior tight end Dave Sprik; senior offensive guard Dan Rhude; junior offensive guard Tom Van Wagner; and junior linebacker Kurt Anderson. Rhude also received the NIC's "Glen Galligan Award" as the NIC's outstanding senior student-athlete.

== 1975 ==
1975 Michigan Tech Huskies football
- Conference: Northern Intercollegiate Conference
- Record: 7–2 (4–2 NIC)
- Head coach: Jim Kapp (3rd season)

1975 Northern Intercollegiate Conference football standings
	Conf.					Overall
Team	W		L		T	W		L		T
No. 10 Minnesota Morris $	6	–	0	–	0	8	–	1	–	0
St. Cloud State	5	–	1	–	0	7	–	3	–	0
Michigan Tech	4	–	2	–	0	7	–	2	–	0
Winona State	3	–	3	–	0	5	–	4	–	0
Moorhead State	2	–	4	–	0	2	–	7	–	0
Bemidji State	1	–	5	–	0	2	–	7	–	0
Southwest State (MN)	0	–	6	–	0	1	–	7	–	0
$ – Conference champion; Rankings from NAIA Division I poll

The 1975 Michigan Tech Huskies football team represented Michigan Technological University as a member of the Northern Intercollegiate Conference (NIC) during the 1975 NCAA Division II football season. In their third year under head coach Jim Kapp, the Huskies compiled a 7–2 record (4–2 in conference games), finished third in the NIC, and outscored opponents by a total of 245 to 53.

=== Schedule ===
Date	Opponent	Site	Result	Attendance	Source
September 6	Northwood	Houghton, MI	W 2–0		
September 13	Alma	Houghton, MI	W 34–7		
September 20	St. Cloud State	Houghton, MI	L 0–3		
September 27	at Winona State	Winona, MN	W 14–7		
October 4	Bemidji State	Houghton, MI	W 55–8		
October 11	at Moorhead State	Moorhead, MN	W 19–3		
October 18	Minnesota-Morris	Houghton, MI	L 15–16		
October 25	at Southwest State (MN)	Marshall, MN	W 85–0		
November 1	at Ferris State	Big Rapids, MI	W 21–9		

== 1976 ==
1976 Michigan Tech Huskies football
- Conference: Northern Intercollegiate Conference
- Record: 7–3 (5–2 NIC)
- Head coach: Jim Kapp (4th season)

1976 Northern Intercollegiate Conference football standings
	Conf.					Overall
Team	W		L		T	W		L		T
No. 10 Minnesota Morris $	7	–	0	–	0	8	–	1	–	1
Michigan Tech	5	–	2	–	0	7	–	3	–	0
Minnesota Duluth	5	–	2	–	0	6	–	4	–	0
St. Cloud State	4	–	3	–	0	8	–	3	–	0
Bemidji State	3	–	4	–	0	6	–	4	–	0
Moorhead State	3	–	4	–	0	5	–	5	–	0
Winona State	1	–	6	–	0	1	–	9	–	0
Southwest State (MN)	0	–	7	–	0	0	–	9	–	0
$ – Conference champion; St. Cloud State forfeited a conference win over Minnesota Duluth and three non-conference wins; NCAA, Northern Sun Intercollegiate Conference, and St. Cloud State records do not reflect the forfeits in the team's overall record.; Rankings from NAIA Division I poll

The 1976 Michigan Tech Huskies football team represented Michigan Technological University as a member of the Northern Intercollegiate Conference (NIC) during the 1976 NCAA Division II football season. In their fourth year under head coach Jim Kapp, the Huskies compiled a 7–3 record (5–2 in conference games), finished in a tie for second place in the NIC, and outscored opponents by a total of 276 to 134.

=== Schedule ===
Date	Opponent	Site	Result	Attendance	Source
September 11	at Northwood*	Midland, MI	W 31–7		
September 18	Grand Valley State*	Houghton, MI	L 8–10	4,000	
September 25	Winona State	Houghton, MI	W 35–0		
October 2	at Bemidji State	Bemidji, MN	W 48–7		
October 9	Moorhead State	Houghton, MI	W 7–3		
October 16	at Minnesota Morris	Morris, MN	L 14–59		
October 23	Southwest State (MN)	Houghton, MI	W 64–7		
October 30	Ferris State*	Houghton, MI	W 39–7		
November 6	at St. Cloud State	St. Cloud, MN	W 16–13		
November 13	at Minnesota Duluth	Duluth, MN	L 14–21		
*Non-conference game

== 1977 ==
1977 Michigan Tech Huskies football
- Conference: Northern Intercollegiate Conference
- Record: 3–7 (1–6 NIC)
- Head coach: Jim Kapp (5th season)

1977 Northern Intercollegiate Conference football standings
	Conf.					Overall
Team	W		L		T	W		L		T
Minnesota Morris $^	7	–	0	–	0	10	–	2	–	0
Bemidji State	5	–	2	–	0	6	–	4	–	0
Moorhead State	5	–	2	–	0	6	–	4	–	0
Minnesota Duluth	4	–	3	–	0	7	–	3	–	0
St. Cloud State	4	–	3	–	0	5	–	6	–	0
Michigan Tech	1	–	6	–	0	3	–	7	–	0
Winona State	1	–	6	–	0	3	–	7	–	0
Southwest State (MN)	1	–	6	–	0	1	–	8	–	0
$ – Conference champion; ^ – NCAA Division III playoff participant

The 1977 Michigan Tech Huskies football team represented Michigan Technological University as a member of the Northern Intercollegiate Conference (NIC) during the 1977 NCAA Division II football season. In their fifth year under head coach Jim Kapp, the Huskies compiled a 3–7 record (1–6 in conference games), finished in a tie for last place in the NIC, and were outscored by a total of 205 to 149.

=== Schedule ===
Date	Opponent	Site	Result	Attendance	Source
September 3	Minnesota Duluth	Houghton, MI	L 6–28		
September 10	Northwood*	Houghton, MI	L 6–21		
September 17	at Grand Valley State*	Lakers Stadium; Allendale, MI	W 10–6	1,026	
September 24	at Winona State	Winona, MN	W 35–0		
October 1	Bemidji State	Houghton, MI	L 20–31		
October 8	at Moorhead State	Moorhead, MN	L 0–24		
October 15	Minnesota Morris	Houghton, MI	L 7–26		
October 22	at Southwest State (MN)	Marshall, MN	L 25–29		
October 29	at Ferris State*	Big Rapids, MI	W 23–17		
November 5	St. Cloud State	Houghton, MI	L 17–23		
*Non-conference game

== 1978 ==
1978 Michigan Tech Huskies football
- Conference: Northern Intercollegiate Conference
- Record: 4–6 (4–4 NIC)
- Head coach: Jim Kapp (6th season)

1978 Northern Intercollegiate Conference football standings
	Conf.					Overall
Team	W		L		T	W		L		T
Minnesota Morris $^	8	–	0	–	0	11	–	1	–	0
Minnesota Duluth	6	–	2	–	0	7	–	3	–	0
St. Cloud State	6	–	2	–	0	6	–	5	–	0
Moorhead State	5	–	3	–	0	6	–	5	–	0
Mankato State	4	–	4	–	0	7	–	4	–	0
Michigan Tech	4	–	4	–	0	4	–	6	–	0
Winona State	2	–	6	–	0	2	–	9	–	0
Southwest State (MN)	1	–	7	–	0	2	–	8	–	0
Bemidji State	0	–	8	–	0	0	–	9	–	0
$ – Conference champion; ^ – NCAA Division III playoff participant

The 1978 Michigan Tech Huskies football team represented Michigan Technological University as a member of the Northern Intercollegiate Conference (NIC) during the 1978 NCAA Division II football season. In their sixth year under head coach Jim Kapp, the Huskies compiled a 4–6 record (4–4 in conference games), finished in a tie for fifth place in the NIC, and were outscored by a total of 203 to 172.

=== Schedule ===
Date	Opponent	Site	Result	Attendance	Source
September 9	at Northwood	Midland, MI	L 10–21		
September 16	Ferris State	Houghton, MI	L 7–28		
September 23	at Minnesota-Duluth	Duluth, MN	L 19–24		
September 30	Southwest State (MN)	Houghton, MI	W 33–20		
October 7	St. Cloud State	Houghton, MI	L 13–28		
October 14	at Bemidji State	Bemidji, MN	W 32–3		
October 21	Winona State	Houghton, MI	W 21–12		
October 28	at Moorhead State	Moorhead, MN	L 11–33		
November 4	Mankato State	Houghton, MI	W 16–13		
November 11	at Minnesota-Morris	Morris, MN	L 10–21		

== 1979 ==
1979 Michigan Tech Huskies football
- Conference: Northern Intercollegiate Conference
- Record: 4–6 (4–4 NIC)
- Head coach: Jim Kapp (7th season)

1979 Northern Intercollegiate Conference football standings
	Conf.					Overall
Team	W		L		T	W		L		T
Minnesota Duluth +	7	–	1	–	0	8	–	2	–	0
Moorhead State +	7	–	1	–	0	8	–	3	–	0
Minnesota Morris ^	6	–	2	–	0	9	–	2	–	0
St. Cloud State	5	–	3	–	0	5	–	6	–	0
Mankato State	4	–	4	–	0	5	–	5	–	0
Michigan Tech	4	–	4	–	0	4	–	6	–	0
Southwest State (MN)	2	–	6	–	0	4	–	7	–	0
Bemidji State	1	–	7	–	0	1	–	8	–	1
Winona State	0	–	8	–	0	0	–	11	–	0
+ – Conference co-champions; ^ – NCAA Division III playoff participant

The 1979 Michigan Tech Huskies football team represented Michigan Technological University as a member of the Northern Intercollegiate Conference (NIC) during the 1979 NCAA Division II football season. In their seventh year under head coach Jim Kapp, the Huskies compiled a 4–6 record (4–4 in conference games), finished in a tie for fifth place in the NIC, and were outscored by a total of 200 to 125.

=== Schedule ===
Date	Opponent	Site	Result	Attendance	Source
September 8	Northwood	Houghton, MI	L 14–35		
September 15	at Ferris State	Big Rapids, MI	L 6–27		
September 22	Minnesota-Duluth	Houghton, MI	L 7–17		
September 29	at Southwest State (MN)	Marshall, MN	W 24–0		
October 6	at St. Cloud State	St. Cloud, MN	L 0–48		
October 13	Bemidji State	Houghton, MI	W 26–24		
October 20	at Winona State	Winona, MN	W 14–10		
October 27	Moorhead State	Houghton, MI	L 3–7		
November 3	at Mankato State	Mankato, MN	L 12–15		
November 10	Minnesota-Morris	Houghton, MI	W 19–17		
