= Joe Fortunato (coach) =

American football, basketball, and baseball coach

Biographical details
- Born: July 4, 1918; Ohio, U.S.
- Died: February 21, 2004 (aged 85); Tecumseh, Michigan, U.S.

Coaching career (HC unless noted)

Football
- c. 1945: Miami (OH) (line)
- 1946: Leetonia HS (OH)
- 1947–1948: Upper Iowa (assistant)
- 1949–1950: Dubuque (line)
- 1951–1952: Toledo (line)
- 1953–1955: Adrian

Basketball
- 1946–1947: Leetonia HS (OH)
- 1947–1949: Upper Iowa
- 1949–1951: Dubuque
- 1953–1956: Adrian

Baseball
- 1952–1953: Toledo
- 1954: Adrian

Administrative career (AD unless noted)
- 1947–1949: Upper Iowa
- c. 1956: Adrian

Head coaching record
- Overall: 8–17–1 (college football); 11–26 (college baseball)

Joseph Fortunato (July 4, 1918 – February 21, 2004) was an American football, basketball, and baseball coach and college athletics administrator. He served as the head football coach at Adrian College from 1953 to 1955, tallying a mark of 8–17–1. Fortunato was also head baseball coach at the University of Toledo from 1952 to 1953 and at Adrian in 1954, compiling a career college baseball record of 11–26. In addition, he served as the head basketball coach at Upper Iowa University and at the University of Dubuque. He died in 2004.

== Early life and education ==
A native of Youngstown, Ohio, Fortunato earned a bachelor of science degree at Kent State University.

== Coaching career ==
Fortunato served in the United States Navy as an athletic officer in the V-5 program at Miami University, where he coached the linemen on the football team under Sid Gillman. From 1946 to 1947, Fortunato coached football and basketball at Leetonia High School in Leetonia, Ohio before moving to Upper Iowa University, where he served as athletic director, head basketball coach, and assistant football coach. He was hired at the University of Dubuque in April 1949 as head basketball coach and football line coach. In April 1951, Fortunato was named line coach at the University of Toledo, joining the football coaching staff headed by Don Greenwood.

Fortunato was the head football coach at Adrian College in Adrian, Michigan. He held that position for three seasons, from 1953 until 1955. His coaching record at Adrian was 8–17–1.

== Head coaching record ==
=== College football ===
Year	Team	Overall	Conference	Standing	Bowl/playoffs
Adrian Bulldogs (Michigan Intercollegiate Athletic Association) (1953–1955)
1953	Adrian	2–5–1	1–4–1	6th	
1954	Adrian	2–7	1–5	T–6th	
1955	Adrian	4–5	2–4	6th	
Adrian:		8–17–1	4–13–1		
Total:		8–17–1			
