= 1978 Sam Houston State Bearkats football team =

American college football season

1978 Sam Houston State Bearkats football
- Conference: Lone Star Conference
- Record: 6–5 (4–3 LSC)
- Head coach: Melvin Brown (1st season)
- Home stadium: Pritchett Field

1978 Lone Star Conference football standings
	Conf.					Overall
Team	W		L		T	W		L		T
No. 1 Angelo State $^	7	–	0	–	0	14	–	0	–	0
No. 11 Abilene Christian	5	–	2	–	0	7	–	3	–	0
Sam Houston State	4	–	3	–	0	6	–	5	–	0
No. 20 Texas A&I	4	–	3	–	0	6	–	5	–	0
Southwest Texas State	3	–	4	–	0	6	–	4	–	0
Stephen F. Austin	3	–	4	–	0	3	–	8	–	0
East Texas State	2	–	3	–	0	4	–	7	–	0
Howard Payne	0	–	7	–	0	2	–	8	–	0
$ – Conference champion; ^ – NAIA Division I playoff participant; Rankings from NAIA Division I poll

The 1978 Sam Houston State Bearkats football team represented Sam Houston State University as a member of the Lone Star Conference (LSC) during the 1978 NAIA Division I football season. Led by first-year head coach Melvin Brown, the Bearkats compiled an overall record of 6–5 with a mark of 4–3 in conference play, and finished tied for third in the LSC.

== Schedule ==
Date	Opponent	Site	Result	Source
September 9	at Southwestern Oklahoma State*	Milam Stadium; Weatherford, OK	W 12–0	
September 16	at Southeastern Louisiana*	Strawberry Stadium; Hammond, LA	L 0–12	
September 23	Angelo State*	Pritchett Field; Huntsville, TX	L 13–42	
September 30	at Texas Lutheran*	Matador Stadium; Seguin, TX	W 21–14	
October 7	East Texas State	Pritchett Field; Huntsville, TX	W 22–7	
October 14	Southwest Texas State	Pritchett Field; Huntsville, TX (rivalry)	W 21–16	
October 21	at Texas A&I	Javelina Stadium; Kingsville, TX	L 24–32	
October 28	Howard Payne	Pritchett Field; Huntsville, TX	W 35–21	
November 4	at Abilene Christian	Shotwell Stadium; Abilene, TX	L 10–34	
November 11	at Angelo State	San Angelo Stadium; San Angelo, TX	L 17–44	
November 18	Stephen F. Austin	Pritchett Field; Huntsville, TX (rivalry)	W 37–13	
*Non-conference game
