= Saginaw Valley State Cardinals football, 1975–1979 =

American college football season

1975–1979 Saginaw Valley State Cardinals football
- Conference: Great Lakes Intercollegiate Athletic Conference
- Head coach: Muddy Waters (1975–1979)
- Home stadium: Harvey Randall Wickes Memorial Stadium

The Saginaw Valley State Cardinals football program, 1975–1979 represented Saginaw Valley State College (SVSC) (now known as Saginaw Valley State University) during the 1970s in college football. SVSC was a member of the Great Lakes Intercollegiate Athletic Conference (GLIAC). The team was led during the period by head coach Muddy Waters.

The team played its home games at Harvey Randall Wickes Memorial Stadium, commonly shortened to Wickes Stadium, in University Center, Michigan.

== Decade overview ==
Year	Head coach	Overall record	Conf. record	Conf. rank	Points scored	Points against	Delta
1975	Muddy Waters	3–7	1–3	5	128	219	-109
1976	Muddy Waters	4–7	0–5	6	213	158	+55
1977	Muddy Waters	6–5	2–3	3 (tie)	193	188	+5
1978	Muddy Waters	4–5–1	1–3–1	4 (tie)	211	210	+1
1979	Muddy Waters	8–2–1	4–0–1	1	295	130	+165
TOTAL		25–26–2	8–14–2				

== Early development ==
- In December 1973, SVC's Board of Control unanimously decided to establish a football program.
- In January 1974, SVC announced that it had received approximately $1 miliion from Saginaw philanthropist H. Randall Wickes, an 85-year-old millionaire and chairman of Wickes Corp., to build a stadium.
- In February 1974, SVC hired Muddy Waters as its head coach. He had been the head football coach at Hillsdale College for the prior 21 yards, posting a 138-46-5 record.
- In the fall of 1974, SVC fielded a non-varsity football team. The team won its first game on September 16, 1974, defeating Northwood's junior varsity team by a 2-16 score at Arthur Hill High School in Saginaw.

== 1975 ==
1975 Saginaw Valley State Cardinals football
- Conference: Great Lakes Intercollegiate Athletic Conference
- Record: 3–7 (1–3 GLIAC)
- Head coach: Muddy Waters (1st season)

1975 Great Lakes Intercollegiate Athletic Conference football standings
	Conf.					Overall
Team	W		L		T	W		L		T
Wayne State (MI) $	3	–	1	–	0	8	–	3	–	0
No. 15 Grand Valley State	3	–	1	–	1	7	–	2	–	1
Northwood	3	–	1	–	1	5	–	4	–	1
Hillsdale	3	–	2	–	0	7	–	4	–	0
Saginaw Valley State	1	–	3	–	0	3	–	7	–	0
Ferris State	0	–	5	–	0	0	–	10	–	0
$ – Conference champion; Rankings from NAIA Division II poll

The 1975 Saginaw Valley State Cardinals football team represented Saginaw Valley State College as a member of the Great Lakes Intercollegiate Athletic Conference (GLIAC) during the 1975 NAIA Division II football season. In their first year under head coach Muddy Waters, the Cardinals compiled a 3–7 record (1–3 in conference games), finished in fifth place in the GLIAC, and were outscored by a total of 219 to 128.

=== Schedule ===
Date	Opponent	Site	Result	Attendance	Source
September 13	Adrian*	University Center, MI	W 29–14	1,900	
September 20	Northeastern Illinois*	University Center, MI	W 20–0		
September 27	at Alma*	Alma, MI	L 6–27		
October 4	at Ferris State	Big Rapids, MI	W 31–28		
October 11	St. Norbert*	University Center, MI	L 6–10		
October 18	at Grand Valley State	Allendale, MI	L 5–32		
October 25	at Northern Michigan*	Marquette, MI	L 15–20		
November 1	at Edinboro*	Edinboro, PA	L 0–21		
November 8	at Northwood	Midland, MI	L 6–30		
November 15	at Hillsdale	Hillsdale, MI	L 10–37		
*Non-conference game

== 1976 ==
1976 Saginaw Valley State Cardinals football
- Conference: Great Lakes Intercollegiate Athletic Conference
- Record: 3–7 (0–5 GLIAC)
- Head coach: Muddy Waters (2nd season)

1976 Great Lakes Intercollegiate Athletic Conference football standings
	Conf.					Overall
Team	W		L		T	W		L		T
No. 15 Northwood $	4	–	1	–	0	5	–	2	–	1
No. 7 Grand Valley State	3	–	2	–	0	8	–	2	–	0
Wayne State (MI)	3	–	2	–	0	6	–	2	–	0
Ferris State	3	–	2	–	0	5	–	5	–	0
Hillsdale	2	–	3	–	0	5	–	5	–	0
Saginaw Valley State	0	–	5	–	0	3	–	7	–	0
$ – Conference champion; Rankings from NAIA Division II poll

The 1976 Saginaw Valley State Cardinals football team represented Saginaw Valley State College as a member of the Great Lakes Intercollegiate Athletic Conference (GLIAC) during the 1976 NAIA Division II football season. In their second year under head coach Muddy Waters, the Cardinals compiled a 3–7 record (0–5 in conference games), finished in sixth and last place in the GLIAC, and outscored opponents by a total of 213 to 158.

=== Schedule ===
Date	Opponent	Site	Result	Attendance	Source
September 4	at William Penn*	Oskaloosa, IA	W 24–21		
September 11	at Hillsdale	Hillsdale, MI	L 6–7		
September 18	at Adrian*	Adrian, MI	W 31–7		
September 25	Northeastern Illinois*	Wickes Stadium; University Center, MI	W 17–0		
October 2	Grand Rapids JC*	Wickes Stadium; University Center, MI	W 50–0		
October 9	at Youngstown State*	Youngstown, OH	L 21–22		
October 16	Grand Valley State	Wickes Stadium; University Center, MI	L 6–17	2,000	
October 23	Wayne State (MI)	Detroit, MI	L 14–31	2,100	
October 30	at St. Norbert*	De Pere, WI	L 14–15		
November 6	at Ferris State	Top Taggart Field; Big Rapids, MI	L 23–24		
November 13	Northwood	Wickes Stadium; University Center, MI	L 7–14		
*Non-conference game

== 1977 ==
1977 Saginaw Valley State Cardinals football
- Conference: Great Lakes Intercollegiate Athletic Conference
- Record: 6–5 (2–3 GLIAC)
- Head coach: Muddy Waters (3rd season)

1977 Great Lakes Intercollegiate Athletic Conference football standings
	Conf.					Overall
Team	W		L		T	W		L		T
No. 18 Grand Valley State $	4	–	1	–	0	7	–	3	–	0
Wayne State (MI)	3	–	2	–	0	7	–	4	–	0
Hillsdale	2	–	3	–	0	6	–	4	–	0
Northwood	2	–	3	–	0	5	–	4	–	0
Saginaw Valley State	2	–	3	–	0	6	–	5	–	0
Ferris State	2	–	3	–	0	3	–	7	–	0
$ – Conference champion; Rankings from NAIA Division II poll

The 1977 Saginaw Valley State Cardinals football team represented Saginaw Valley State College as a member of the Great Lakes Intercollegiate Athletic Conference (GLIAC) during the 1977 NAIA Division II football season. In their third year under head coach Muddy Waters, the Cardinals compiled a 6–5 record (2–3 in conference games), finished in four-way tie for third and last place in the GLIAC, and outscored opponents by a total of 193 to 188.

=== Schedule ===
Date	Opponent	Site	Result	Attendance	Source
September 3	William Penn*	Wickes Stadium; University Center, MI	W 31–6		
September 10	Hillsdale	Wickes Stadium; University Center, MI	L 13–21		
September 17	Edinboro*	Wickes Stadium; University Center, MI	W 21–17		
September 24	Ferris State	Wickes Stadium; University Center, MI	W 38–3		
October 1	at Northern Michigan*	Marquette, MI	L 9–34		
October 8	Youngstown State*	Wickes Stadium; University Center, MI	L 12–22		
October 15	at Grand Valley State	Lubbers Stadium; Allendale, MI	L 14–41	1,508	
October 22	Northeastern Illinois*	Wickes Stadium; University Center, MI	W 13–0		
October 29	St. Norbert*	Wickes Stadium; University Center, MI	W 26–0		
November 5	at Wayne State (MI)	Wayne State Stadium; Detroit, MI	L 7–38	2,600	
November 12	at Northwood	Midland, MI	W 10–6		
*Non-conference game

== 1978 ==
1978 Saginaw Valley State Cardinals football
- Conference: Great Lakes Intercollegiate Athletic Conference
- Record: 4–5–1 (1–3–1 GLIAC)
- Head coach: Muddy Waters (4th season)

1978 Great Lakes Intercollegiate Athletic Conference football standings
	Conf.					Overall
Team	W		L		T	W		L		T
No. 4 Grand Valley State $^	5	–	0	–	0	9	–	3	–	0
Wayne State (MI)	4	–	1	–	0	5	–	4	–	0
Northwood	2	–	3	–	0	5	–	4	–	0
Saginaw Valley State	1	–	3	–	1	4	–	5	–	1
Ferris State	1	–	3	–	1	3	–	5	–	2
Hillsdale	1	–	4	–	0	5	–	6	–	0
$ – Conference champion; ^ – NAIA Division I playoff participant; Rankings from NAIA Division I poll

The 1978 Saginaw Valley State Cardinals football team represented Saginaw Valley State College as a member of the Great Lakes Intercollegiate Athletic Conference (GLIAC) during the 1978 NAIA Division I football season. In their fourth year under head coach Muddy Waters, the Cardinals compiled a 4–5–1 record (1–3–1 in conference games), finished in a tie for fourth place in the GLIAC, and outscored opponents by a total of 211 to 210.

=== Schedule ===
Date	Opponent	Site	Result	Attendance	Source
September 9	Wayne State (MI)	Wickes Stadium; University Center, MI	L 10–14		
September 16	Indianapolis*	Wickes Stadium; University Center, MI	W 21–7		
September 23	Ferris State	Wickes Stadium; University Center, MI	T 17–17		
September 30	at Youngstown State*	Youngstown, OH	L 12–49		
October 7	at St. Norbert*	De Pere, WI	W 16–7		
October 14	Grand Valley State	Wickes Stadium; University Center, MI	L 14–24	2,039–2,250	
October 21	at Northeastern Illinois*	Chicago, IL	W 37–28		
October 28	at Hillsdale	Hillsdale, MI	W 28–6		
November 4	at Western Illinois*	Macomb, IL	L 26–27		
November 11	Northwood	Wickes Stadium; University Center, MI	L 30–31		
*Non-conference game

== 1979 ==
1979 Saginaw Valley State Cardinals football

GLIAC champion

NAIA Division I quarterfinals, L 6–36 vs. Presbyterian
- Conference: Great Lakes Intercollegiate Athletic Conference
- Record: 8–2–1 (4–0–1 GLIAC)
- Head coach: Muddy Waters (5th season)
- Home stadium: Harvey Randall Wickes Memorial Stadium

1979 Great Lakes Intercollegiate Athletic Conference football standings
	Conf.					Overall
Team	W		L		T	W		L		T
No. 8 Saginaw Valley State $^	4	–	0	–	1	8	–	2	–	1
Wayne State (MI)	3	–	1	–	1	3	–	5	–	1
Ferris State	3	–	2	–	0	5	–	4	–	1
Grand Valley State	2	–	3	–	0	4	–	5	–	0
Northwood	1	–	4	–	0	5	–	4	–	0
Hillsdale	1	–	4	–	0	3	–	8	–	0
$ – Conference champion; ^ – NAIA Division I playoff participant; Rankings from NAIA Division I poll

The 1979 Saginaw Valley State Cardinals football team represented Saginaw Valley State College as a member of the Great Lakes Intercollegiate Athletic Conference (GLIAC) during the 1979 NAIA Division I football season. In their fifth year under head coach Muddy Waters, the Cardinals compiled an 8–2–1 record (4–0–1 in conference games), won the GLIAC championship, and outscored opponents by a total of 295 to 130.

=== Schedule ===
Date	Opponent	Site	Result	Attendance	Source
September 8	Northeastern Illinois*	Wickes Stadium; University Center, MI	W 51–0		
September 15	at Indianapolis*	Indianapolis, IN	W 29–12		
September 22	at Western Illinois*	Hanson Field; Macomb, IL	L 7–27	5,218	
September 29	Evansville*	Wickes Stadium; University City, MI	W 23–0		
October 6	at Hillsdale	Hillsdale, MI	W 21–3		
October 13	Grand Valley State	Wickes Stadium; University City, MI	W 32–24		
October 20	at Northwood	Midland, MI	W 20–7		
October 27	at Ferris State	Top Taggart Field; Big Rapids, MI	W 22–14		
November 3	at Mexico Educacion*	Mexico City	W 77–0		
November 10	Wayne State (MI)	Wickes Stadium; University City, MI	T 7–7		
December 1	at Presbyterian*	Clinton, SC (NAIA Division I quarterfinal)	L 6–36		
*Non-conference game
