= Don Owens (American football) =

American football player (1932–1997)

No. 72, 70
- Positions: Defensive tackle, offensive tackle

Personal information
- Born: April 3, 1932; St. Louis, Missouri, U.S.
- Died: August 17, 1997 (aged 65); Jefferson City, Missouri, U.S.
- Listed height: 6 ft 5 in (1.96 m)
- Listed weight: 255 lb (116 kg)

Career information
- High school: St. Mark's (MO)
- College: Southern Miss
- NFL draft: 1957: 3rd round, 30th overall pick

Career history
- Washington Redskins (1957); Philadelphia Eagles (1958–1960); St. Louis Cardinals (1960-1963)

Awards and highlights
- NFL champion (1960); First-team Little All-American (1956)

Career NFL statistics
- Fumble recoveries: 9
- Sacks: 8.5
- Touchdowns: 1
- Stats at Pro Football Reference

Donald Fred Owens (April 3, 1932 – August 17, 1997) was an American professional football defensive tackle and offensive tackle in the National Football League (NFL) for the Washington Redskins, the Philadelphia Eagles, and the St. Louis Cardinals.

Born in St. Louis, Missouri, Owens played college football at the University of Southern Mississippi and was drafted in the third round of the 1957 NFL draft by the Pittsburgh Steelers.
