= Nate Clark =

American football player (1933–2005)

- Nate Clark, 1955

Hillsdale Chargers
- Position: Halfback
- Class: Graduate

Personal information
- Born: February 28, 1933; Hawkinsville, Georgia
- Died: February 5, 2005 (aged 71)
- Listed height: 5 ft 8 in (1.73 m)
- Listed weight: 195 lb (88 kg)

Career information
- College: Hillsdale (1953–1956)

Awards and highlights
- 2× First-team Little All-American (1955, 1956); NCAA scoring leader (1955)

Nathan Clark Jr. (February 28, 1933 – February 9, 2005) was an American football halfback who played college football at Hillsdale College from 1953 to 1956. He led Hillsdale to consecutive undefeated seasons in 1955 and 1956 and was selected as a first-team back on the Little All-America teams in both years. He also led the country in scoring with 144 points scored in 1955.

== Early life ==
Clark was born in Hawkinsville, Georgia, and raised in Benton Harbor, Michigan. He overcame a speech impediment.

He excelled in sports and appeared in every football game for Benton Harbor High School from 1949 to 1952. He was twice selected as an all-state player. He was also a Golden Gloves champion of Michigan. He compiled a 42–2 record as a boxer.

== Hillsdale College ==
Clark enrolled at Hillsdale College in the fall of 1953. He was the scoring leader for Hillsdale in 1953 with six touchdowns and one extra point in seven games played. As a sophomore in 1954, he was the top scorer in the Michigan Intercollegiate Athletic Association.

In 1955, Clark rushed for 949 yards and led all of college football with 144 points (24 touchdowns) scored in nine games played. His 144 points led small college football by 36 points over the second-highest scorer. It was also the highest point total scored by a football player in Michigan since Willie Heston in the early 1900s. At the end of the season, he was selected by the Associated Press as a first-team back on the 1955 Little All-America college football team.

The 1955 Hillsdale team was invited to play in the 1956 Tangerine Bowl, but the players unanimously decided to decline the invitation after bowl officials advised that Hillsdale's four black players (Clark included) would not be allowed to play. Clark later recalled: "I felt bad for the team because it deprived them of the opportunity to play in the bowl, but I was proud of the guys who made the decision because we couldn’t go as a team."

Clark was chosen as co-captain of the 1956 Hillsdale team. With defenses focusing on Clark, his scoring declined, but the extra coverage focused on Clark opened up room for other backs, and Hillsdale coach Muddy Waters opined that Clark played "the best of his four seasons" in 1956. He helped lead Hillsdale to its second consecutive undefeated season and was again included on the first team of the Little All-America team.

== Family and later years ==
Clark was married in 1956 to his high school sweetheart, Lucille Butler. They had four children.

In June 1957, Clark received his bachelor's degree in physical education from Hillsdale. He attended camp with the Green Bay Packers, but he hurt his knee and was cut in August 1957.

He also returned to boxing in 1957. Clark and his family moved to Detroit in 1969, where he worked for a construction company. He was inducted into Hillsdale's athletic hall of fame in 1998.

Clark suffered from diabetes in his later years. He died in 2005 at age 71.

== Additional reading ==
- Nate Clark Piles Up TDs, Steak Dinners, October 25, 1955
