= 1956 Little All-America college football team =

American college football all-star team

The 1956 Little All-America college football team is composed of college football players from small colleges and universities who were selected by the Associated Press (AP) as the best players at each position. For 1956, the AP selected three teams of 11 players each, with no separate defensive platoons.

Senior back William Rhodes of Western State (Colorado) rushed for 1,200 yards on 130 carries. His total of 327 yards against Adam State set a single-game college football record. His career average of 8.49 yards per carry was the highest in college football history, and his career total of 4,294 rushing yards ranked second best in college football history.

Another senior back, Larry Houdek of Kansas Wesleyan, rushed for 1,432 yards and 19 touchdowns (114 points) on 168 carries. He also passed for two touchdowns.

James "Jimmy" Stehlin of Brandeis University, tallied 1,566 yards of total offense on 1,155 passing yards and 411 rushing yards.

Running back Nate Clark, an African American from Benton Harbor, Michigan, led Hillsdale College to its second consecutive undefeated season and was named to the first team for the second consecutive year.

Others receiving first-team honors for the second consecutive year were end Charles Schultz of Alfred, tackle Vince Vidas of Drexel, and guard Steve Myhra of North Dakota.

== First team ==
Position	Player	Team
B	James Stehlin	Brandeis
B	Nate Clark	Hillsdale
B	Larry Houdek	Kansas Wesleyan
B	William Rhodes	Western State (CO)
E	Charles Schultz	Alfred
E	Milton Robichaux	Trinity (TX)
T	Don Owens	Mississippi Southern
T	Vincent Vidas	Drexel
G	Steve Myhra	North Dakota
G	Bob Mitchell	Puget Sound
C	William Earp	Emory & Henry

== Second team ==
Position	Player	Team
B	Bill Englehardt	Omaha
B	Jim Podoley	Central Michigan
B	Al Frazier	Florida A&M
B	Whizzer White	Westminster (PA)
E	Steve Junker	Xavier
E	James Cox	Cal Poly
T	George Kurker	Tufts
T	Ron Warzeka	Montana State
G	Arden Ray	Lenoir–Rhyne
G	Charles Froehle	St. John's (MN)
C	Hall Whitley	Texas A&I

== Third team ==
Position	Player	Team
B	Bobby Grisham	Sam Houston State
B	Dick Jamieson	Bradley
B	Terry Sweeney	Middle Tennessee
B	Larry Thomson	Air Force
E	George Benedict	Springfield (MA)
E	Albert Hill	Penn Military
T	Lyle Slater	Millikin
T	George Rice	Wofford
G	John McMurry	Whittier
G	Wixie Robinson	Pepperdine
C	Lee Glenn	Sewanee

== See also ==
- 1956 College Football All-America Team
