= Grand Valley State Lakers football, 1970–1979 =

American college football season

1970–1979 Grand Valley State Lakers football
- Conference: Great Lakes Intercollegiate Athletic Conference (1972–1979)
- Head coach: Rip Collins (1970–1972); Jim Harkema (1973–1982)
- Home stadium: Lubbers Stadium (1979–present)

The Grand Valley State Lakers football program, 1970–1979 represented Grand Valley State College (renamed Grand Valley State University in 1988) during the 1970s in NAIA and NCAA Division II college football as a member of the Great Lakes Intercollegiate Athletic Conference (GLIAC). The team was led by head coaches Rip Collins (1970–1972) and Jim Harkema (1973–1982).

The team played its home games at Lubbers Stadium, named after former university president Arend Lubbers, located on GVSU's main campus in Allendale, Michigan.

== 1970 ==
1970 Grand Valley State Lakers football
- Conference: Independent
- Record: 1–5
- Head coach: Rip Collins (1st season)

In 1970, Grand Valley State launched its football program with six non-varsity games.

Rip Collins was hired in March 1970 as the school's first head football coach and an assistant professor of physical education. Collins had been on the faculty of Ottawa Hill High School since 1950.

=== Schedule ===
Date	Opponent	Site	Result	Attendance	Source
October 5	at Alma junior varsity	Alma, MI	L 6–21		
October 10	at Ionia Reformatory	Ionia, MI	L		
October 15	Ferris State freshmen	Big Rapids, MI	W 20–12		
October 30	at Oakland Community College	Rochester, MI	L 6–24		
November 5	at Ferris State freshmen	South Field	L 7–14		
November 10	at Central Michigan freshmen	Mount Pleasant, MI	L 0–40		

== 1971 ==
1971 Grand Valley State Lakers football
- Conference: Independent
- Record: 0–7
- Head coach: Rip Collins (2nd season)

The 1971 Grand Valley State Lakers football team represented Grand Valley State University (GVSU) as a member of the Great Lakes Intercollegiate Athletic Conference (GLIAC) during the 1971 NAIA Division II football season. In their second year under head coach Rip Collins, the Lakers compiled a 0–7 record and were outscored by a total of 338 to 27.

The team inaugurated GVSU's varsity football history. Collins was the program's first head coach, and he had two assistants, Jim Scott and Riley Swinehart.

In the team's first official game, the Lakers lost to Grand Rapids Junior College. In their first game against rival Ferris State, the Lakers were defeated by a 57-0 score, the widest margin of victory to that date in Ferris State football history against a four-year school.

The team did not have a home football field.

=== Schedule ===
Date	Opponent	Site	Result	Attendance	Source
September 11	at Grand Rapids	Houseman Field; Grand Rapids, MI	L 7–47	4,000	
September 18	at Kalamazoo	Angell Field; Kalamazoo, MI	L 7–42		
September 25	at Chicago Circle	Soldier Field; Chicago, IL	L 7–27		
October 2	at Alma	Alma, MI	L 0–31		
October 9	at Ferris State	Big Rapids, MI	L 0–57		
October 23	at Findlay	Findlay, OH	L 6–70		
November 13	at Hope	Holland, MI	L 0–64		

== 1972 ==
1972 Grand Valley State Lakers football
- Conference: Independent
- Record: 0–6
- Head coach: Rip Collins (3rd season)

The 1972 Grand Valley State Lakers football team represented Grand Valley State College (GVSC) as an independent during the 1972 NAIA Division II football season. In their third and final year under head coach Rip Collins, the Lakers compiled a 0–6 record and were outscored by a total of 199 to 71.

Collins resigned as GVSC's head football coach at the end of the 1972 season. He retained his post as a professor of physical education. While Collins' 1970 won one junior varsity game in 1970, his teams lost 13 consecutive intercollegiate varsity games in 1971 and 1972.

The Lakers played their first home game on their new football field on October 22, a loss against Findlay. The field was equipped with portable bleachers with the capacity to seat nearly 3,000 fans.

=== Schedule ===
Date	Opponent	Site	Result	Attendance	Source
September 16	at Kalamazoo	Kalamazoo, MI	L 14–24		
September 23	at Ferris State	Big Rapids, MI	L 40–42		
September 30	at Alma	Alma, MI	L 0–53		
October 21	Findlay	Allendale, MI	L 6–38		
October 28	at Manchester	North Manchester, IN	L 0–21		
	at Grand Rapids	Grand Rapids, MI	L 11–21		

== 1973 ==
1973 Grand Valley State Lakers football
- Conference: Great Lakes Intercollegiate Athletic Conference
- Record: 6–3 (0–2 GLIAC)
- Head coach: Jim Harkema (1st season)
- Home stadium: Lakers Stadium

1973 Great Lakes Intercollegiate Athletic Conference football standings
	Conf.					Overall
Team	W		L		T	W		L		T
Northwood $	2	–	0	–	0	6	–	2	–	0
Ferris State	1	–	1	–	0	4	–	4	–	1
Grand Valley State	0	–	2	–	0	6	–	3	–	0
+ – Conference co-champions

The 1973 Grand Valley State Lakers football team represented Grand Valley State University (GVSU) as a member of the Great Lakes Intercollegiate Athletic Conference (GLIAC) during the 1973 NAIA Division II football season. In their first year under head coach Jim Harkema, the Lakers compiled a 6–3 record (0–2 in conference games), finished in last place out of three teams in the GLIAC, and outscored opponents by a total of 259 to 120.

Harkema, at age 30, was hired as the head football coach in January 1973 following the resignation of Rip Collins at the end of the 1972 season. Harkema had been a multisport athlete at Kalamazoo College, accumulating 10 varsity letters. He had most recently been an assistant football coach at Northern Illinois University.

=== Schedule ===
Date	Opponent	Site	Result	Attendance	Source
September 15	Kalamazoo*	Lakers Stadium; Allendale, MI	W 27–14	2,300	
September 22	at Chicago Circle*	Chicago, IL	W 40–8		
September 29	Alma*	Lakers Stadium; Allendale, MI	L 14–28		
October 6	Ferris State	Lakers Stadium; Allendale, MI	L 13–17		
October 13	Grand Rapids*	Lakers Stadium; Allendale, MI	W 30–21		
October 20	at Findlay*	Findlay, OH	W 52–6		
October 27	Manchester*	Lakers Stadium; Allendale, MI	W 28–9		
November 3	at Northwood	Midland, MI	L 7–14		
November 10	at Adrian*	Adrian, MI	W 48–3		
*Non-conference game

== 1974 ==
1974 Grand Valley State Lakers football
- Conference: Great Lakes Intercollegiate Athletic Conference
- Record: 6–3 (1–2 GLIAC)
- Head coach: Jim Harkema (2nd season)
- Home stadium: Lakers Stadium

1974 Great Lakes Intercollegiate Athletic Conference football standings
	Conf.					Overall
Team	W		L		T	W		L		T
Northwood +	2	–	1	–	0	5	–	5	–	0
Ferris State +	2	–	1	–	0	3	–	6	–	1
No. T–17 Grand Valley State	1	–	2	–	0	6	–	3	–	0
Hillsdale	1	–	2	–	0	6	–	3	–	1
+ – Conference co-champions; Rankings from NAIA Division II poll

The 1974 Grand Valley State Lakers football team represented Grand Valley State University (GVSU) as a member of the Great Lakes Intercollegiate Athletic Conference (GLIAC) during the 1974 NAIA Division II football season. In their second year under head coach Jim Harkema, the Lakers compiled a 6–3 record (1–2 in conference games), tied for last place out of four teams in the GLIAC, and outscored opponents by a total of 225 to 87.

=== Schedule ===
Date	Opponent	Site	Result	Attendance	Source
September 14	at Kalamazoo*	Kalamazoo, MI	W 28–12		
September 28	Alma*	Lakers Stadium; Allendale, MI	W 7–0		
October 5	Ferris State	Lakers Stadium; Allendale, MI	L 12–17		
October 12	Findlay*	Lakers Stadium; Allendale, MI	W 41–7		
October 19	at Grand Rapids*	Grand Rapids, MI	L 19–21		
October 26	at Manchester*	North Manchester, IN	W 49–0		
November 2	Northwood	Lakers Stadium; Allendale, MI	L 13–14		
November 9	Adrian*	Lakers Stadium; Allendale, MI	W 42–6		
November 16	at Hillsdale	Hillsdale, MI	W 14–10		
*Non-conference game

== 1975 ==
1975 Grand Valley State Lakers football
- Conference: Great Lakes Intercollegiate Athletic Conference
- Record: 7–2–1 (3–1–1 GLIAC)
- Head coach: Jim Harkema (3rd season)
- Home stadium: Lakers Stadium

1975 Great Lakes Intercollegiate Athletic Conference football standings
	Conf.					Overall
Team	W		L		T	W		L		T
Wayne State (MI) $	3	–	1	–	0	8	–	3	–	0
No. 15 Grand Valley State	3	–	1	–	1	7	–	2	–	1
Northwood	3	–	1	–	1	5	–	4	–	1
Hillsdale	3	–	2	–	0	7	–	4	–	0
Saginaw Valley State	1	–	3	–	0	3	–	7	–	0
Ferris State	0	–	5	–	0	0	–	10	–	0
$ – Conference champion; Rankings from NAIA Division II poll

The 1975 Grand Valley State Lakers football team represented Grand Valley State University (GVSU) as a member of the Great Lakes Intercollegiate Athletic Conference (GLIAC) during the 1975 NAIA Division II football season. In their third year under head coach Jim Harkema, the Lakers compiled a 7–2–1 record (3–1–1 in conference games), tied for second place in the GLIAC, and outscored opponents by a total of 264 to 96.

=== Schedule ===
Date	Opponent	Site	Result	Attendance	Source
September 6	at Wayne State (MI)	Wayne State Stadium; Detroit, MI	L 6–15	4,375	
September 13	at Valparaiso*	Valparaiso, IN	W 17–6		
September 20	Grand Rapids*	Lakers Stadium; Allendale, MI	W 17–13		
September 27	Illinois Benedictine*	Lakers Stadium; Allendale, MI	W 31–6		
October 4	Northeastern Illinois*	Lakers Stadium; Allendale, MI	W 68–6		
October 11	at Ferris State	Big Rapids, MI	W 38–0		
October 18	Saginaw Valley State	Lakers Stadium; Allendale, MI	W 32–5		
October 25	at Northwood	Midland, MI	T 7–7		
November 1	at No. 11 Northern Michigan*	Marquette, MI	L 17–21	4,002	
November 8	Hillsdale	Lakers Stadium; Allendale, MI	W 31–17		
*Non-conference game; Rankings from AP Poll released prior to the game

== 1976 ==
1976 Grand Valley State Lakers football
- Conference: Great Lakes Intercollegiate Athletic Conference
- Record: 8–2 (3–2 GLIAC)
- Head coach: Jim Harkema (4th season)
- Home stadium: Lakers Stadium

1976 Great Lakes Intercollegiate Athletic Conference football standings
	Conf.					Overall
Team	W		L		T	W		L		T
No. 15 Northwood $	4	–	1	–	0	5	–	2	–	1
No. 7 Grand Valley State	3	–	2	–	0	8	–	2	–	0
Wayne State (MI)	3	–	2	–	0	6	–	2	–	0
Ferris State	3	–	2	–	0	5	–	5	–	0
Hillsdale	2	–	3	–	0	5	–	5	–	0
Saginaw Valley State	0	–	5	–	0	3	–	7	–	0
$ – Conference champion; Rankings from NAIA Division II poll

The 1976 Grand Valley State Lakers football team represented Grand Valley State University (GVSU) as a member of the Great Lakes Intercollegiate Athletic Conference (GLIAC) during the 1976 NAIA Division I football season. In their fourth year under head coach Jim Harkema, the Lakers compiled an 8–2 record (3–2 in conference games), finished in a three-way tie for second place in the GLIAC, and outscored opponents by a total of 194 to 131.

=== Schedule ===
Date	Opponent	Site	Result	Attendance	Source
September 11	at Grand Rapids*	Grand Rapids, MI	W 23–7	4,000	
September 18	at Michigan Tech*	Houghton, MI	W 10–8	4,000	
September 25	at Franklin (IN)*	Franklin, IN	W 31–27	1,200	
October 2	at Northeastern Illinois*	Chicago, IL	W 26–0	300	
October 9	Ferris State	Lakers Stadium; Allendale, MI	L 23–26	1,750	
October 16	at Saginaw Valley State	University Center, MI	W 17–6	2,000	
October 23	at Hillsdale	Hillsdale, MI	W 16–3	3,000	
October 30	Northwood	Lakers Stadium; Allendale, MI	L 14–40	1,200	
November 6	Wayne State (MI)	Lakers Stadium; Allendale, MI	W 3–0	1,900	
November 13	Northern Michigan*	Lakers Stadium; Allendale, MI	W 31–14	3,800	
*Non-conference game

== 1977 ==
1977 Grand Valley State Lakers football

GLIAC champion
- Conference: Great Lakes Intercollegiate Athletic Conference
- Record: 7–3 (4–1 GLIAC)
- Head coach: Jim Harkema (5th season)
- Home stadium: Lakers Stadium

1977 Great Lakes Intercollegiate Athletic Conference football standings
	Conf.					Overall
Team	W		L		T	W		L		T
No. 18 Grand Valley State $	4	–	1	–	0	7	–	3	–	0
Wayne State (MI)	3	–	2	–	0	7	–	4	–	0
Hillsdale	2	–	3	–	0	6	–	4	–	0
Northwood	2	–	3	–	0	5	–	4	–	0
Saginaw Valley State	2	–	3	–	0	6	–	5	–	0
Ferris State	2	–	3	–	0	3	–	7	–	0
$ – Conference champion; Rankings from NAIA Division II poll

The 1977 Grand Valley State Lakers football team represented Grand Valley State University (GVSU) as a member of the Great Lakes Intercollegiate Athletic Conference (GLIAC) during the 1977 NAIA Division I football season. In their fifth year under head coach Jim Harkema, the Lakers compiled a 7–3 record (4–1 in conference games), won the GLIAC championship, and outscored opponents by a total of 212 to 128.

=== Schedule ===
Date	Opponent	Site	Result	Attendance	Source
September 10	vs. Bowling Green*	Houseman Field; Grand Rapids, MI	L 6–17	2,869	
September 17	Michigan Tech*	Lakers Stadium; Allendale, MI	L 6–10	1,026	
September 24	Franklin (IN)*	Lakers Stadium; Allendale, MI	W 41–35	726	
October 1	at Northeastern Illinois*	Chicago, IL	W 34–12	220	
October 8	at Ferris State	Big Rapids, MI	L 7–11	9,000	
October 15	Saginaw Valley State	Lakers Stadium; Allendale, MI	W 41–14	1,508	
October 22	Defiance*	Lakers Stadium; Allendale, MI	W 24–0	1,131	
October 29	at Northwood	Midland, MI	W 16–6	2,750	
November 5	Hillsdale	Lakers Stadium; Allendale, MI	W 31–20	1,968	
November 12	at Wayne State (MI)	Wayne State Stadium; Detroit, MI	W 6–3	3,748	
*Non-conference game

== 1978 ==
1978 Grand Valley State Lakers football

GLIAC champion

NAIA Division I semifinal, L 7–13 at Elon
- Conference: Great Lakes Intercollegiate Athletic Conference
- Record: 9–3 (5–0 GLIAC)
- Head coach: Jim Harkema (6th season)
- Home stadium: Lakers Stadium

1978 Great Lakes Intercollegiate Athletic Conference football standings
	Conf.					Overall
Team	W		L		T	W		L		T
No. 4 Grand Valley State $^	5	–	0	–	0	9	–	3	–	0
Wayne State (MI)	4	–	1	–	0	5	–	4	–	0
Northwood	2	–	3	–	0	5	–	4	–	0
Saginaw Valley State	1	–	3	–	1	4	–	5	–	1
Ferris State	1	–	3	–	1	3	–	5	–	2
Hillsdale	1	–	4	–	0	5	–	6	–	0
$ – Conference champion; ^ – NAIA Division I playoff participant; Rankings from NAIA Division I poll

The 1978 Grand Valley State Lakers football team represented Grand Valley State University (GVSU) as a member of the Great Lakes Intercollegiate Athletic Conference (GLIAC) during the 1978 NAIA Division I football season. In their sixth year under head coach Jim Harkema, the Lakers compiled a 9–3 record (5–0 in conference games), won the GLIAC championship, and outscored opponents by a total of 333 to 229. They advanced to the NAIA Division I playoffs, defeating Wisconsin–La Crosse in the quarterfinals before losing to Elon in the semifinals.

=== Schedule ===
Date	Opponent	Site	Result	Attendance	Source
September 9	Northeastern Illinois*	Lakers Stadium; Allendale, MI	W 34–7	856	
September 16	at Northern Michigan*	Marquette, MI	L 22–49	9,062	
September 23	at Bowling Green*	Doyt Perry Stadium; Bowling Green, OH	L 3–49	14,846	
September 30	at Franklin (IN)*	Franklin, IN	W 62–19	527	
October 7	Ferris State	Lakers Stadium; Allendale, MI	W 38–14	1,415–1,491	
October 14	at Saginaw Valley State	University Center, MI	W 24–14	2,039–2,250	
October 21	Central State (OH)*	Lakers Stadium; Allendale, MI	W 31–12	1,569	
October 28	Northwood^{†}	Lakers Stadium; Allendale, MI	W 36–7	1,527	
November 4	at Hillsdale	Hillsdale, MI	W 28–21	2,300	
November 11	Wayne State (MI)	Lakers Stadium; Allendale, MI	W 24–14	2,382	
December 2	at Wisconsin–La Crosse*	Memorial Field; La Crosse, WI (NAIA Division I quarterfinal)	W 24–14	2,150	
December 9	at Elon*	Burlington Memorial Stadium; Burlington, NC (NAIA Division I semifinal)	L 7–13		
*Non-conference game; ^{†}Homecoming

== 1979 ==
1979 Grand Valley State Lakers football
- Conference: Great Lakes Intercollegiate Athletic Conference
- Record: 4–5 (2–3 GLIAC)
- Head coach: Jim Harkema (7th season)
- Home stadium: Lubbers Stadium

1979 Great Lakes Intercollegiate Athletic Conference football standings
	Conf.					Overall
Team	W		L		T	W		L		T
No. 8 Saginaw Valley State $^	4	–	0	–	1	8	–	2	–	1
Wayne State (MI)	3	–	1	–	1	3	–	5	–	1
Ferris State	3	–	2	–	0	5	–	4	–	1
Grand Valley State	2	–	3	–	0	4	–	5	–	0
Northwood	1	–	4	–	0	5	–	4	–	0
Hillsdale	1	–	4	–	0	3	–	8	–	0
$ – Conference champion; ^ – NAIA Division I playoff participant; Rankings from NAIA Division I poll

The 1979 Grand Valley State Lakers football team represented Grand Valley State University (GVSU) as a member of the Great Lakes Intercollegiate Athletic Conference (GLIAC) during the 1979 NAIA Division I football season. In their seventh year under head coach Jim Harkema, the Lakers compiled a 4–5 record (2–3 in conference games), finished in fourth place in the GLIAC, and outscored opponents by a total of 215 to 182.

The team played its home games at the new Lubbers Stadium.

=== Schedule ===
Date	Opponent	Site	Result	Attendance	Source
September 15	Northern Michigan*	Lubbers Stadium; Allendale, MI	L 14–41	4,854	
September 22	at Northeastern Illinois*	Chicago, IL	W 48–7	200	
September 29	Franklin (IN)*	Lubbers Stadium; Allendale, MI	W 56–14	3,853	
October 6	at Wayne State (MI)	Wayne State Stadium; Detroit, MI	L 14–17	3,000	
October 13	at Saginaw Valley State	University Center, MI	L 24–32	1,125	
October 20	at Western Michigan*	Waldo Stadium; Kalamazoo, MI	L 0–37	14,500	
October 27	Hillsdale	Lubbers Stadium; Allendale, MI	W 28–6	3,174	
November 3	at Northwood	Midland, MI	W 22–14	1,800	
November 10	Ferris State	Lubbers Stadium; Allendale, MI	L 9–14	3,209	
*Non-conference game
