= Rolla Anderson =

American football and basketball coach (1920–2018)

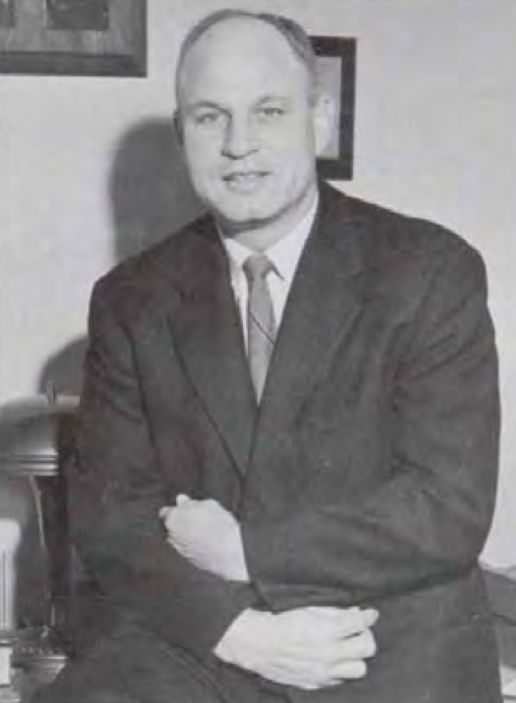
- Anderson from the 1958 Boiling Point

Biographical details
- Born: August 1, 1920
- Died: April 25, 2018 (aged 97)

Playing career

Football
- 1941–1942: Southeast Missouri State
- 1943: Western Michigan

Basketball
- 1941–1943: Southeast Missouri State
- 1943–1944: Western Michigan
- Position: End (football)

Coaching career (HC unless noted)

Football
- 1953–1966: Kalamazoo

Basketball
- 1953–1955: Kalamazoo

Administrative career (AD unless noted)
- 1953–1985: Kalamazoo

Head coaching record
- Overall: 56–56–1 (football); 12–25 (basketball)

Accomplishments and honors

Championships
- Football; 2 MIAA (1962–1963)

Rolla Leonard Anderson (August 1, 1920 – April 25, 2018) was an American football and basketball coach and athletics administrator. He served as the head football at Kalamazoo College in Kalamazoo, Michigan for 14 seasons, from 1953 to 1966, compiling a record of 56–56–1. Anderson was also the head basketball coach at Kalamazoo for two seasons, from 1953 to 1955, tallying a mark of 12–25.

== Life and career ==
A native of Mount Vernon, Illinois, Anderson played football and basketball at Southeast Missouri State Teachers College, now Southeast Missouri State University, and at Western Michigan College, now Western Michigan University, graduating from the latter in 1944. Anderson married Patricia Jean Anderson (November 18, 1922 – March 15, 2010) on December 23, 1944, in Washington, D.C. He died in April 2018 at the age of 97.

== Head coaching record ==
=== Football ===
| Year | Team | Overall | Conference | Standing | Bowl/playoffs |
|---|---|---|---|---|---|
Kalamazoo Hornets (Michigan Intercollegiate Athletic Association) (1953–1966)
| 1953 | Kalamazoo | 1–7 | 0–6 | 7th | |
| 1954 | Kalamazoo | 6–2 | 4–2 | T–2nd | |
| 1955 | Kalamazoo | 5–3 | 4–2 | 2nd | |
| 1956 | Kalamazoo | 5–3 | 5–1 | 2nd | |
| 1957 | Kalamazoo | 2–5–1 | 2–3–1 | 5th | |
| 1958 | Kalamazoo | 0–8 | 0–6 | 7th | |
| 1959 | Kalamazoo | 2–6 | 1–5 | T–5th | |
| 1960 | Kalamazoo | 4–5 | 2–3 | 4th | |
| 1961 | Kalamazoo | 4–4 | 3–2 | 3rd | |
| 1962 | Kalamazoo | 8–0 | 5–0 | 1st | |
| 1963 | Kalamazoo | 6–2 | 4–1 | T–1st | |
| 1964 | Kalamazoo | 5–3 | 3–2 | 3rd | |
| 1965 | Kalamazoo | 5–3 | 3–2 | T–2nd | |
| 1966 | Kalamazoo | 3–5 | 2–3 | T–4th | |
| Kalamazoo: | | 56–56–1 | 38–38–1 | | |
| Total: | | 56–56–1 | | | |
National championship Conference title Conference division title or championship game berth
