= 1978 Angelo State Rams football team =

American college football season

1978 Angelo State Rams football

NAIA Division I national champion LSC champion

City of Palms Bowl, W 34–14 vs. Elon
- Conference: Lone Star Conference
- Record: 14–0 (7–0 LSC)
- Head coach: Jim Hess (5th season)
- Offensive coordinator: Harold Mayo (1st season)

1978 Lone Star Conference football standings
	Conf.					Overall
Team	W		L		T	W		L		T
No. 1 Angelo State $^	7	–	0	–	0	14	–	0	–	0
No. 11 Abilene Christian	5	–	2	–	0	7	–	3	–	0
Sam Houston State	4	–	3	–	0	6	–	5	–	0
No. 20 Texas A&I	4	–	3	–	0	6	–	5	–	0
Southwest Texas State	3	–	4	–	0	6	–	4	–	0
Stephen F. Austin	3	–	4	–	0	3	–	8	–	0
East Texas State	2	–	3	–	0	4	–	7	–	0
Howard Payne	0	–	7	–	0	2	–	8	–	0
$ – Conference champion; ^ – NAIA Division I playoff participant; Rankings from NAIA Division I poll

The 1978 Angelo State Rams football team was an American football team that represented Angelo State University and won the national championship during the 1978 NAIA Division I football season. In their fifth season under head coach Jim Hess, the Rams compiled a perfect 14–0 record. They participated in the NAIA Division I playoffs, defeating Western State (CO) (35–3) in the semifinals and Elon (34–14) in the City of Palms Bowl to win the NAIA Division I championship.

== Schedule ==
Date	Opponent	Site	Result	Attendance	Source
September 9	Central State (OK)*	San Angelo Stadium; San Angelo, TX	W 42–13		
September 16	at Eastern New Mexico*	Greyhound Stadium; Portales, NM	W 40–0		
September 23	at Sam Houston State	Pritchett Field; Huntsville, TX	W 42–13		
September 30	at East Central*	Ada, OK	W 14–7		
October 7	Stephen F. Austin	San Angelo Stadium; San Angelo, TX	W 15–3		
October 14	Abilene Christian	San Angelo Stadium; San Angelo, TX	W 33–8		
October 21	at Howard Payne	Cen-Tex Stadium; Brownwood, TX	W 38–22		
October 28	Texas A&I	San Angelo Stadium; San Angelo, TX	W 21–19		
November 4	at Southwest Texas State	Evans Field; San Marcos, TX	W 29–6	11,000	
November 11	Sam Houston State	San Angelo Stadium; San Angelo, TX	W 44–17	11,000	
November 18	at East Texas State	Memorial Stadium; Commerce, TX	W 35–14		
December 2	Oregon College*	San Angelo Stadium; San Angelo, TX (NAIA Division I quarterfinal)	W 32–0		
December 9	Western State (CO)*	San Angelo Stadium; San Angelo, TX (NAIA Division I semifinal)	W 35–3	5,363	
December 16	vs. Elon*	McAllen Veterans Memorial Stadium; McAllen, TX (City of Palms Bowl)	W 34–14	8,443	
*Non-conference game
