= Al Frazier =

American gridiron football player (1935–2018)

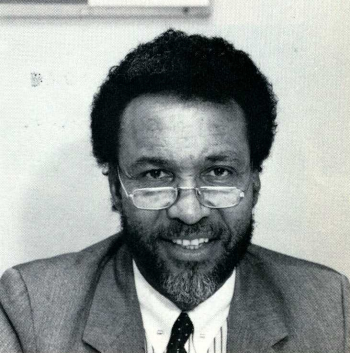
- Circa 1987 as Director of Financial Aid at York College/CUNY

No. 83, 42
- Positions: Flanker, halfback

Personal information
- Born: March 28, 1935; Jacksonville, Florida, U.S.
- Died: December 2, 2018 (aged 83); Lawrenceville, Georgia, U.S.
- Listed height: 5 ft 11 in (1.80 m)
- Listed weight: 180 lb (82 kg)

Career information
- High school: Stanton (Jacksonville)
- College: Florida A&M
- NFL draft: 1957: 20th round, 240th overall pick

Career history
- Toronto Argonauts (1957); Ottawa Rough Riders (1960); Dallas Cowboys (1961–1963)

Awards and highlights
- Grey Cup champion (1960); Second-team Little All-American (1956)

Career AFL statistics
- Rushing yards: 278
- Rushing average: 4.5
- Receptions: 58
- Receiving yards: 1,010
- Total touchdowns: 11
- Stats at Pro Football Reference

Adolphus Cornelius Frazier (March 28, 1935 – December 2, 2018) was an American professional football player. He played as a halfback for three seasons with the Denver Broncos in the American Football League (AFL). He set many franchise record for receptions out of the backfield, some of which still stand. Frazier played two seasons in the Canadian Football League (CFL): 1957 with the Toronto Argonauts and 1960 with the Grey Cup champion Ottawa Rough Riders.

After his football career ended, he earned a master's degree from Teachers College, Columbia University and worked for over 30 years at York College, City University of New York, where he was Assistant Dean of Student Development at the time of his retirement in 2006.

As of 2017's NFL off-season, Al Frazier held at least three Broncos franchise records, including:

- Receiving Yds: rookie game (166 on October, 15 1961 against the Oakland Raiders)
- Receiving TDs: rookie season (6 in 1961)
- 100+ yard receiving games: rookie season (3)

Frazier died on December 2, 2018, in Lawrenceville, Georgia.
