= Muddy Waters (American football) =

American football player and coach (1923–2006)

- Waters at Michigan State

Biographical details
- Born: January 30, 1923; Chico, California, U.S.
- Died: September 20, 2006 (aged 83); Saginaw, Michigan, U.S.

Playing career
- 1946–1949: Michigan State
- Position: Fullback

Coaching career (HC unless noted)
- 1950–1951: Walled Lake HS (MI)
- 1952: Albion HS (MI)
- 1953: Hillsdale (assistant)
- 1954–1973: Hillsdale
- 1974–1979: Saginaw Valley State
- 1980–1982: Michigan State

Administrative career (AD unless noted)
- 1953–1974: Hillsdale
- 1974–1980: Saginaw Valley State

Head coaching record
- Overall: 173–96–7 (college)
- Bowls: 1–0
- Tournaments: 0–4 (NAIA playoffs)

Accomplishments and honors

Championships
- 6 MIAA (1954–1959); 1 GLIAC (1979)

Awards
- NAIA Coach of the Year (1957); Michigan Coach of the Year (8 times); NAIA Coach's Hall of Fame
- College Football Hall of Fame; Inducted in 2000 (profile)

Franklin Dean "Muddy" Waters Jr. (January 30, 1923 – September 20, 2006) was an American football player and coach. He served as the head football coach at Hillsdale College (1954–1973), Saginaw Valley State University (1975–1979), and Michigan State University (1980–1982), compiling a career college football head coaching record of 173–96–7. Waters was inducted into the College Football Hall of Fame as a coach in 2000.

== Early years and playing career ==
Waters was born in Chico, California and grew up in Wallingford, Connecticut. He attended Pawling School in Pawling, New York. He was both football and track captain at the Choate School, from which he graduated in 1943, and where he was inducted into the Athletics Hall of Fame in 2004. He played fullback for Michigan State from 1946 to 1949 under coaches Charlie Bachman and Biggie Munn.

In May 1950, Water signed with the Green Bay Packers of the National Football League (NFL).

== Coaching career ==
=== High school ===
Waters began his coaching career in 1950 as head football coach at Walled Lake High School in Walled Lake, Michigan. He led Walled Lake to an undefeated season in 1951 before leaving the school the following year to become head football coach at Albion High School in Albion, Michigan.

=== Hillsdale ===
In 1953, Waters was appointed athletic director at Hillsdale College in Hillsdale, Michigan, and was also hired to serve as an assistant football coach under his former mentor at Michigan State, Charlie Bachman. He succeeded Bachman as head football coach in 1954. His Hillsdale Chargers teams won 34 consecutive games from 1954 to 1957 while playing as member of the Michigan Intercollegiate Athletic Association (MIAA). In 1955, his 9–0 team refused to play in the Tangerine Bowl when game officials prohibited the team's black players from participating. He was named NAIA Coach of the Year in 1957, a year in which the team played in the NAIA football national championship and was chosen by the Washington D.C. Touchdown Club as the best small college team in the country. In his final year at the school, its stadium was renamed "Frank 'Muddy' Waters Stadium."

=== Saginaw Valley State ===
After leaving Hillsdale with a 138–47–5 record, Waters went on to serve as the first head coach of the Saginaw Valley State University Cardinals from 1975 to 1979, posting a 25–26–2 record and capturing a Great Lakes Intercollegiate Athletic Conference title in his final season.

=== Michigan State ===
In 1980, Michigan State hired Waters as head football coach after an NCAA probation. Waters coached for three seasons, but got fired after a 10–23 record in three seasons. Despite his firing just before the last game of the season, Waters was popular enough with players and fans to be carried off the field after his final 24–18 loss to Iowa.

== Later life and death ==
After leaving MSU's head coach position, Waters continued to live in East Lansing and participated as a member of the MSU community for the next two decades. He was inducted into the College Football Hall of Fame in 2000 in the Small College category. Waters died of congestive heart failure at age 83 in Saginaw, Michigan.

== Head coaching record ==
=== College ===
Year	Team	Overall	Conference	Standing	Bowl/playoffs
Hillsdale Dales (Michigan Intercollegiate Athletic Association) (1954–1959)
1954	Hillsdale	7–1–1	6–0	1st	
1955	Hillsdale	9–0	6–0	1st	
1956	Hillsdale	9–0	6–0	1st	
1957	Hillsdale	9–1	6–0	1st	L NAIA Championship
1958	Hillsdale	7–2	5–1	T–1st	
1959	Hillsdale	8–2	6–0	1st	L NAIA Semifinal
Hillsdale Dales/Chargers (NAIA / NAIA Division I independent) (1960–1973)
1960	Hillsdale	9–1			W Mineral Water
1961	Hillsdale	6–3			
1962	Hillsdale	5–3–1			
1963	Hillsdale	6–3–1			
1964	Hillsdale	7–2–1			
1965	Hillsdale	6–3			
1966	Hillsdale	3–5–1			
1967	Hillsdale	3–5			
1968	Hillsdale	6–3			
1969	Hillsdale	9–2			L NAIA Semifinal
1970	Hillsdale	9–2			
1971	Hillsdale	6–5			
1972	Hillsdale	6–2			
1973	Hillsdale	7–2			
Hillsdale:		138–47–5	35–1		
Saginaw Valley State Cardinals (Great Lakes Intercollegiate Athletic Conference) (1975–1979)
1975	Saginaw Valley State	3–7	1–3	5th	
1976	Saginaw Valley State	4–7	0–5	6th	
1977	Saginaw Valley State	6–5	2–3	T–3rd	
1978	Saginaw Valley State	4–5–1	1–3–1	4th	
1979	Saginaw Valley State	8–2–1	4–0–1	1st	L NAIA Division I Quarterfinal
Saginaw Valley State:		25–26–2	8–14–2		
Michigan State Spartans (Big Ten Conference) (1980–1982)
1980	Michigan State	3–8	2–6	9th	
1981	Michigan State	5–6	4–5	T–6th	
1982	Michigan State	2–9	2–7	T–8th	
Michigan State:		10–23	8–18		
Total:		173–96–7			
National championship Conference title Conference division title or championship game berth
