= 1955 Little All-America college football team =

American college football all-star team

The 1955 Little All-America college football team is composed of college football players from small colleges and universities who were selected by the Associated Press (AP) as the best players at each position. For 1955, the AP selected three teams of 11 players each, with no separate defensive platoons.

Junior back Nate Clark of Hillsdale College, an African American from Benton Harbor, Michigan, was named to the first team after leading all of college football with 144 points (24 touchdowns) scored.

== First team ==
Position	Player	Team
B	Nate Clark	Hillsdale
B	Gene Scott	Centre
B	Dave Burnham	Wheaton (IL)
B	Charles Sticka	Trinity (CT)
E	Charles Schultz	Alfred
E	Richard Donlin	Hamline
T	Charles Gibbons	Rhode Island
T	Vincent Vidas	Drexel
G	Wixie Robinson	Pepperdine
G	Steve Myhra	North Dakota
C	Hubert Cook	Trinity (TX)

== Second team ==
Position	Player	Team
B	Elroy Payne	McMurry
B	William Englehardt	Omaha
B	William Rhodes	Western State (CO)
B	Jimmy Zaiser	Delaware
E	George Cilek	Coe
E	Ronald Henry	Hampden–Sydney
T	Roger Siesel	Miami (OH)
T	Sherman Plunkett	Maryland State
G	Gerry Luth	Pacific Lutheran
G	Luther Shealey	Presbyterian
C	William Vanderstoep	Whitworth

== Third team ==
Position	Player	Team
B	William Hamilton	Florence State
B	Jack Schultz	Luther
B	Don Baker	North Texas State
B	James Higgason	Southwestern Louisiana
E	Harry Drexler	Juniata
E	Jack Hecker	Bowling Green
T	Joe DeKasar	Upsala
T	Allen Dunham	Texas Lutheran
G	Roland Merrifield	Maine
G	Tom Hofflander	Augsburg
C	Jerry Angell	Hobart

== See also ==
- 1955 College Football All-America Team
