= 1978 NAIA Division I football season =

American college football season

- Regular season: August–November 1978
- Postseason: December 2–16, 1978
- National Championship: McAllen Veterans Memorial Stadium; McAllen, TX
- Champions: Angelo State

The 1978 NAIA Division I football season was the 23rd season of college football sponsored by the NAIA, was the ninth season of play of the NAIA's top division for football.

The season was played from August to November 1978 and culminated in the 1978 NAIA Division I Football National Championship. Known this year as the Palm Bowl, the title game was played on December 16, 1978 at McAllen Veterans Memorial Stadium in McAllen, Texas.

Angelo State defeated Elon in the Palm Bowl, 24–14, to win their first NAIA national title.

== Conference changes ==
- This is the final season that the NAIA officially recognizes a football champion from two conferences, the Pennsylvania State Athletic Conference and the Southwestern Athletic Conference. The SWAC has since become an NCAA Division I FCS conference while the PSAC competes at the Division II level; both continue to sponsor football.

== Conference standings ==
1978 Arkansas Intercollegiate Conference football standings
	Conf.					Overall
Team	W		L		T	W		L		T
No. 5 Central Arkansas $^	6	–	0	–	0	9	–	2	–	0
No. 16 Henderson State	4	–	1	–	1	7	–	2	–	1
No. 9 Ouachita Baptist	4	–	2	–	0	8	–	2	–	0
Harding	3	–	2	–	1	5	–	4	–	1
Arkansas Tech	2	–	4	–	0	5	–	5	–	0
Arkansas–Monticello	1	–	5	–	0	5	–	6	–	0
Southern Arkansas	0	–	6	–	0	2	–	8	–	0
$ – Conference champion; ^ – NAIA Division I playoff participant; Rankings from NAIA Division I poll

1978 Central States Intercollegiate Conference football standings
	Conf.					Overall
Team	W		L		T	W		L		T
No. 10 Kearney State $	7	–	0	–	0	8	–	0	–	1
Missouri Southern	4	–	2	–	1	6	–	3	–	1
Fort Hays State	4	–	2	–	1	6	–	5	–	1
Missouri Western	4	–	3	–	0	5	–	5	–	0
Wayne State (NE)	3	–	2	–	2	4	–	4	–	2
Emporia State	2	–	5	–	0	3	–	7	–	0
Washburn	2	–	5	–	0	4	–	6	–	0
No. T–18 Pittsburg State*	0	–	7	–	0	1	–	9	–	0
$ – Conference champion; * – Pittsburg State forfeited conference wins over Kearney State, Missouri Southern, Missouri Western, Wayne State (NE), Emporia State, and Washburn.; Rankings from NAIA Division I poll

1978 Evergreen Conference football standings
	Conf.					Overall
Team	W		L		T	W		L		T
No. 8 Oregon College $^	5	–	1	–	0	8	–	2	–	0
Eastern Washington	4	–	2	–	0	6	–	4	–	0
Oregon Tech	3	–	3	–	0	5	–	4	–	0
Eastern Oregon	3	–	3	–	0	5	–	5	–	0
Southern Oregon	3	–	3	–	0	4	–	5	–	0
Western Washington	3	–	3	–	0	4	–	6	–	0
Central Washington	0	–	6	–	0	0	–	9	–	0
$ – Conference champion; ^ – NAIA Division I playoff participant Central Washington forfeited victories over Eastern Oregon, Oregon Tech, and Southern Oregon because of an inelgible player.; Rankings from NAIA Division I poll

1978 Great Lakes Intercollegiate Athletic Conference football standings
	Conf.					Overall
Team	W		L		T	W		L		T
No. 4 Grand Valley State $^	5	–	0	–	0	9	–	3	–	0
Wayne State (MI)	4	–	1	–	0	5	–	4	–	0
Northwood	2	–	3	–	0	5	–	4	–	0
Saginaw Valley State	1	–	3	–	1	4	–	5	–	1
Ferris State	1	–	3	–	1	3	–	5	–	2
Hillsdale	1	–	4	–	0	5	–	6	–	0
$ – Conference champion; ^ – NAIA Division I playoff participant; Rankings from NAIA Division I poll

1978 Lone Star Conference football standings
	Conf.					Overall
Team	W		L		T	W		L		T
No. 1 Angelo State $^	7	–	0	–	0	14	–	0	–	0
No. 11 Abilene Christian	5	–	2	–	0	7	–	3	–	0
Sam Houston State	4	–	3	–	0	6	–	5	–	0
No. 20 Texas A&I	4	–	3	–	0	6	–	5	–	0
Southwest Texas State	3	–	4	–	0	6	–	4	–	0
Stephen F. Austin	3	–	4	–	0	3	–	8	–	0
East Texas State	2	–	3	–	0	4	–	7	–	0
Howard Payne	0	–	7	–	0	2	–	8	–	0
$ – Conference champion; ^ – NAIA Division I playoff participant; Rankings from NAIA Division I poll

1978 Minnesota Intercollegiate Athletic Conference football standings
	Conf.					Overall
Team	W		L		T	W		L		T
No. 1 Concordia–Moorhead * +	7	–	1	–	0	11	–	1	–	0
St. Olaf +^	7	–	1	–	0	9	–	2	–	0
No. 15 Gustavus Adolphus	6	–	2	–	0	8	–	2	–	0
No. T–20 Saint John's (MN)	5	–	3	–	0	6	–	3	–	0
St. Thomas (MN)	4	–	4	–	0	5	–	4	–	0
Hamline	3	–	4	–	1	5	–	4	–	1
Augsburg	2	–	5	–	1	3	–	6	–	1
Bethel (MN)	1	–	7	–	0	2	–	8	–	0
Macalester	0	–	8	–	0	0	–	9	–	0
+ – Conference co-champions; ^ – NCAA Division III playoff participant; * – NAIA Division II playoff participant; Rankings from NAIA Division II poll

1978 Oklahoma Intercollegiate Conference football standings
	Conf.					Overall
Team	W		L		T	W		L		T
East Central $	4	–	0	–	0	4	–	6	–	0
NW Oklahoma State	3	–	1	–	0	6	–	4	–	0
Northeastern State	1	–	2	–	1	6	–	3	–	1
SW Oklahoma State	1	–	2	–	1	2	–	6	–	1
SE Oklahoma State	0	–	4	–	0	2	–	7	–	0
$ – Conference champion

1978 Pennsylvania State Athletic Conference football standings
	Conf.					Overall
Team	W		L		T	W		L		T
East Division
East Stroudsburg xy$	5	–	0	–	0	10	–	1	–	0
Cheyney	4	–	1	–	0	6	–	3	–	0
Bloomsburg	3	–	2	–	0	6	–	4	–	0
Millersville	2	–	3	–	0	6	–	3	–	0
Kutztown	1	–	4	–	0	2	–	7	–	0
Mansfield	0	–	5	–	0	2	–	8	–	0
West Division
No. 17 Clarion xy	5	–	1	–	0	8	–	3	–	0
Shippensburg x	5	–	1	–	0	7	–	3	–	0
Slippery Rock	4	–	2	–	0	6	–	3	–	0
Edinboro	3	–	3	–	0	3	–	6	–	1
Indiana (PA)	2	–	4	–	0	4	–	5	–	1
California (PA)	1	–	4	–	1	2	–	7	–	1
Lock Haven	0	–	5	–	1	1	–	8	–	1
Championship: East Stroudsburg 49, Clarion 4
$ – Conference champion; x – Division champion/co-champions; y – Championship game participant; Shippensburg was ineligible for conference title game.; Rankings from NAIA Division I poll

1978 Rocky Mountain Athletic Conference football standings
	Conf.					Overall
Team	W		L		T	W		L		T
No. 3 Western State (CO) $^	8	–	0	–	0	10	–	1	–	0
Southern Utah	5	–	3	–	0	7	–	3	–	0
Adams State	5	–	3	–	0	6	–	4	–	0
Western New Mexico	5	–	3	–	0	5	–	4	–	0
Fort Lewis	4	–	4	–	0	4	–	6	–	0
Mesa	4	–	4	–	0	4	–	6	–	0
Westminster (UT)	2	–	6	–	0	2	–	7	–	0
Colorado Mines	2	–	6	–	0	3	–	7	–	0
New Mexico Highlands	1	–	7	–	0	1	–	9	–	0
Southern Colorado *	0	–	0	–	0	8	–	2	–	0
$ – Conference champion; ^ – NAIA Division I playoff participant * – ineligible for conference title; Rankings from NAIA Division I poll

1978 South Atlantic Conference football standings
	Conf.					Overall
Team	W		L		T	W		L		T
No. 2 Elon +^	6	–	0	–	1	9	–	1	–	1
No. 13 Presbyterian +	6	–	0	–	1	8	–	2	–	1
No. T–18 Newberry	4	–	3	–	0	7	–	3	–	0
Lenoir–Rhyne	4	–	3	–	0	6	–	5	–	0
Mars Hill	2	–	5	–	0	5	–	7	–	0
Gardner–Webb	2	–	5	–	0	4	–	5	–	1
Catawba	2	–	5	–	0	4	–	6	–	0
Carson–Newman	1	–	6	–	0	2	–	8	–	0
+ – Conference co-champions; ^ – NAIA Division I playoff participant; Rankings from NAIA Division I poll

1978 West Virginia Intercollegiate Athletic Conference football standings
	Conf.					Overall
Team	W		L		T	W		L		T
Northern Division
Shepherd xy	6	–	3	–	0	7	–	4	–	0
West Virginia Wesleyan	6	–	3	–	0	6	–	3	–	0
Fairmont State	5	–	4	–	0	5	–	4	–	1
Salem	4	–	5	–	0	4	–	6	–	0
West Liberty State	2	–	7	–	0	2	–	8	–	0
Southern Division
No. 6 Concord xy$^	8	–	1	–	0	10	–	2	–	0
West Virginia Tech	6	–	3	–	0	6	–	3	–	0
West Virginia State	6	–	3	–	0	6	–	4	–	0
Glenville State	1	–	7	–	0	2	–	7	–	0
Bluefield State	0	–	9	–	0	0	–	10	–	0
Championship: Concord 35, Shepherd 14
$ – Conference champion; x – Division champion/co-champions; y – Championship game participant; ^ – NAIA Division I playoff participant Conference standings based on power ratings; Rankings from NAIA Division I poll

1978 Wisconsin State University Conference football standings
	Conf.					Overall
Team	W		L		T	W		L		T
No. 7 Wisconsin–La Crosse +^	7	–	1	–	0	9	–	2	–	0
Wisconsin–Whitewater +	7	–	1	–	0	7	–	4	–	0
No. 12 Wisconsin–Eau Claire	6	–	2	–	0	8	–	2	–	0
Wisconsin–Stout	5	–	3	–	0	7	–	3	–	0
Wisconsin–Oshkosh	3	–	5	–	0	4	–	6	–	0
Wisconsin–River Falls	3	–	5	–	0	4	–	6	–	0
Wisconsin–Stevens Point	2	–	6	–	0	4	–	6	–	0
Wisconsin–Platteville	2	–	5	–	0	3	–	7	–	0
Wisconsin–Superior	1	–	7	–	0	2	–	9	–	0
+ – Conference co-champions; ^ – NAIA Division I playoff participant; Rankings from NAIA Division I poll

1978 NAIA Division I independents football records
	Conf.			Overall
Team	W	L	T	W		L		T
No. 15 Cameron		–		7	–	2	–	1
No. 14 Kentucky State		–		7	–	2	–	1
Guilford		–		5	–	4	–	0
Eastern New Mexico		–		5	–	6	–	0
Liberty Baptist		–		4	–	5	–	1
Langston		–		3	–	7	–	0
Wofford		–		3	–	8	–	0
Rankings from NAIA Division I poll

== Conference champions ==
Conference	Champion	Record
Arkansas Intercollegiate	Central Arkansas	6–0
Central States	Kearney State	7–0
Evergreen	Oregon College	5–1
Great Lakes	Grand Valley State	5–0
Lone Star	Angelo State	7–0
NIC	Minnesota–Morris	8–0
Oklahoma	East Central State	4–0
PSAC	Clarion State; Shippensburg State	5–1
RMAC	Western State	8–0
South Atlantic	Elon; Presbyterian	6–0–1
SWAC	Grambling State	5–0–1
WVIAC	North: Shepherd; South: Concord	6–3; 8–1
Wisconsin State	Wisconsin–La Crosse; Wisconsin–Whitewater	7–1; 7–1

== Postseason ==
Quarterfinals; December 2, 1978; Campus sites
Grand Valley State	24
Wisconsin–La Crosse*	14
Concord	6
Elon*	21
Western State	21
Central Arkansas*	17
Oregon College	0
Angelo State*	32

Semifinals; December 9, 1978; Campus sites
Grand Valley State	7
Elon*	13
Western State	3
Angelo State*	35

1978 Palm Bowl; December 16, 1978; McAllen, TX
Elon	14
Angelo State	24

== See also ==
- 1978 NAIA Division II football season
- 1978 NCAA Division I-A football season
- 1978 NCAA Division I-AA football season
- 1978 NCAA Division II football season
- 1978 NCAA Division III football season
