= Bobby Jackson (American football coach) =

American football player and coach (born 1940)

Profile
- Positions: Quarterback, running back

Personal information
- Born: February 16, 1940 (age 86); Forsyth, Georgia, U.S.

Career information
- High school: Forsyth (GA) Persons
- College: South Georgia, Howard

Career history
- Florida State (1965–1969) Defensive ends coach & linebackers coach; Kansas State (1970–1972) Quarterbacks coach & running backs coach; Kansas State (1973–1974) Defensive coordinator; Louisville (1975–1976) Defensive coordinator; Tennessee (1977–1979) Running backs coach; Tennessee (1980–1982) Defensive coordinator; Atlanta Falcons (1983–1985) Linebackers coach; Atlanta Falcons (1986) Tight ends coach; San Diego Chargers (1987–1991) Running backs coach; Phoenix Cardinals (1992–1993) Running backs coach; Washington Redskins (1994–1999) Running backs coach; St. Louis Rams (2000–2002) Offensive coordinator & running backs coach; Miami Dolphins (2007) Running backs coach
- Coaching profile at Pro Football Reference

Robert Lanier Jackson (born February 16, 1940) is an American former football coach and college player who was a professional assistant coach in the National Football League (NFL) for 21 seasons, including three as an offensive coordinator. In his NFL tenure, Jackson coached five Pro Bowl running backs, including at least one in three of his five stops where he has tutored the running backs. The list consists of Pro Football Hall of Fame player Marshall Faulk (St. Louis Rams 2000–02), Stephen Davis (Washington Redskins 1999), Terry Allen (Washington Redskins 1996), Brian Mitchell (Washington Redskins, 1995), and Marion Butts (San Diego Chargers, 1990–91).

== Early life ==
Jackson was born and raised on a small rural farm in Forsyth, Georgia. He was raised by his parents Anice Rocquemore and Roy Henry Jackson, who was a veteran of World War I that was wounded in the Meuse-Argonne Offensive.

Jackson's first experience with football would shape his life. In the 7th grade, he tried out for football and after the 3rd day, the football coach, in front of the team, stripped Jackson's uniform off him on the practice field and gave it to a bigger kid. Jackson was humiliated and worked on his running skills and tried out again in the 9th grade, soon becoming the starting running back.

Jackson attended and played high school football at Mary Persons High School. He later played college football at South Georgia College in 1958 under legendary Florida State University head coach Bobby Bowden and assistant coach Vince Gibson. In 1959, Bowden was offered the head football coaching job at Samford (then called Howard College) and Jackson followed Bowden to Birmingham, Alabama.

From 1959 to 1962, Jackson was a starter on all sides of the Howard football team and was one of the last of the 60 Minute Men, football players who played the entire 60 minutes of the football game. On offense, he was the running back, on the defense as a defensive back, and was on the punt and kickoff return teams. While at Howard, Jackson was a two-time small college All-American running back. In numerous interviews, Bowden has said that Jackson was the best all around player that he ever coached. Over the course of his Howard career, Jackson had 287 rushing attempts for 2,084 yards, 27 touchdowns and 7.3 yards per carry - Samford University's all-time record for highest yards-per-carry - while the team went 31–6 and received bowl bids to the Textile Bowl and the Golden Isle Bowl.

While at Howard College, Jackson met his wife Nancy Eleanor Howard. Nancy Howard was the reigning Howard College Beauty Queen at the time and when Jackson decided he wanted a date with her, Jackson and 4 other football players kidnapped Nancy Howard as she was walking with her boyfriend on campus. Nancy Howard was held until she agreed to go on a date with Jackson and has been with him ever since.

After graduating from Howard College with a bachelor's degree physical education, Jackson went on to earn his master's degree in physical education from Peabody College, now a part of Vanderbilt University, in Nashville, Tennessee. From 1963 to 1964, Jackson coached football and track at Shades Valley High School in Homewood, Alabama.

== College coaching career ==
In 1965, Jackson was brought on as a volunteer football coach under head coach Bill Peterson at Florida State University. In 1966, Jackson became the linebacker and defensive end coach and stayed with Coach Peterson thru the 1969 Season. From 1965 thru 1969, Jackson was part of an incredible coach staff that included Bobby Bowden, Joe Gibbs, Dan Henning, Don James, Bob Harbison, Don Powell, Don Breaux, Joe Avezzano, Bill Cox, Gene McDowell, Gary Wyant, Neil Schmidt, Al Conover, John McGregor, Bill Crutchfield, Ken MacLean, Doug Hafner, Bud Whitehead, Charlie Wright, Don Fauls, and Frank DeBord. During his time at FSU, Jackson coached All-American linebacker Dale McCullers and defensive end Wayne McDuffie. Jackson also coached and recruited All-Southern defensive end Ron Wallace.

From 1970 to 1974, Jackson joined head coach Vince Gibson at Kansas State University. Jackson joined the purple pride coaching staff that included R.C. Slocum, Jerry Sullivan, and Joe Madden. From 1970 to 1972, Jackson coached the quarterbacks and running backs, which included quarterbacks Lynn Dickey and Steve Grogan. At running back, Jackson coached Mike Montgomery, Bill Butler, and Don Calhoun. In 1973, Jackson became the defensive coordinator and linebacker coach. On the defensive side, he coached linebacker Gary Spani.

In 1975 and 1976, Jackson once again joined head coach Vince Gibson at the University of Louisville as his defensive coordinator and coached the linebackers.

From 1977 to 1982, Jackson joined the University of Tennessee coaching staff, under head coach Johnny Majors.

== Professional coaching career ==
In 1983, Jackson joined head coach Dan Henning at the Atlanta Falcons. While at the Atlanta Falcons, he coached the linebackers from 1983 to 1985 and the H-backs and tight ends in 1986.

From 1987 to 1991, Jackson coached the running backs for the San Diego Chargers under head coaches Al Saunders and Dan Henning. During Jackson's five-year tenure as running backs coach in San Diego, the Chargers surpassed the 4.0-yard per carry mark in each of his final four seasons. In fact, over that four-year stretch (1988–91), the Chargers averaged 4.6 yards per rushing attempt, and led the NFL in this department in 1991 (4.8), while finishing second in 1988 (4.7), and third in 1990 (4.7). Gary Anderson (1,119 yards in 1988) and Marion Butts (1,225 yards in 1990) each went over 1,000 yards during that time.

In 1992 and 1993, Jackson joined the Phoenix Cardinals as the running backs coach under head coach Joe Bugel. In 1993, Ronald Moore amassed 1,018 yards rushing, the first Cardinals running back to break the 1,000-yard barrier since 1985. Also in Jackson's final year, Larry Centers led the team with 60 receptions, a figure which ranked second among National Football Conference (NFC) running backs that year.

Jackson served as the running backs coach for the Washington Redskins from 1994 to 1999, under head coach Norv Turner. During his six years in Washington, the team produced a 1,000-yard running back three times, including Terry Allen (1995–96) and Stephen Davis (1999). Allen finished third in the NFC in rushing both times he reached the plateau, while Davis led the conference in that category in 1999. As a unit, the Redskins topped the 4.0-yard average per carry mark on four occasions.

From 2000 to 2002, Jackson was the associate head coach, offensive coordinator, and running backs coach for the St. Louis Rams under head coach Mike Martz. In his three years as the offensive coordinator for the Greatest Show on Turf in St. Louis, the Rams led the NFL in total offense in 2000 and 2001 as they averaged 442.2 and 418.1 yards per game, respectively, in those two years. in 2000, the Rams offense scored 540 points, averaging 33.8 points per game. In 2001, the Rams won the NFC Championship and the offense scored 503 points, averaging 31.4 points per game. In addition, Hall of Fame running back Marshall Faulk surpassed the 1,000-yard rushing mark twice during that time, finishing second in the NFC in rushing in 2000 (1,359 yards) and third in 2001 (1,359 yards). He also led all NFC running backs in receptions all three years, as he averaged more than 81 catches a season over that stretch. The Rams' running game averaged more than 4.0 yards per attempt all three seasons.

In 2003, Jackson retired from the game and moved to his farm in Alabama. In 2007, Jackson was lured out of retirement by head coach Cam Cameron to coach the running backs for the Miami Dolphins. The Dolphins running backs averaged 4.0 yards per attempt for the season, and Ronnie Brown led the team with 5.1 yards per carry for the season. After the 2007 season, Jackson retired again to his Alabama farm, raising cattle and public speaking.

== Sources ==
- "2007 Miami Dolphins Media Guide" (PDF). Miami Dolphins. Archived from the original (PDF) on October 20, 2007.
- "2010 Samford Football Media Guide". Samford University. Archived from the original (PDF) on October 2, 2011.
