= 1975 Rice Owls football team =

American college football season

1975 Rice Owls football
- Conference: Southwest Conference
- Record: 3–8 (1–6 SWC)
- Head coach: Al Conover (4th season)
- Home stadium: Rice Stadium

1975 Southwest Conference football standings
	Conf.					Overall
Team	W		L		T	W		L		T
No. 7 Arkansas +	6	–	1	–	0	10	–	2	–	0
No. 6 Texas +	6	–	1	–	0	10	–	2	–	0
No. 11 Texas A&M +	6	–	1	–	0	10	–	2	–	0
Texas Tech	4	–	3	–	0	6	–	5	–	0
Baylor	2	–	5	–	0	3	–	6	–	2
SMU	2	–	5	–	0	4	–	7	–	0
Rice	1	–	6	–	0	2	–	9	–	0
TCU	1	–	6	–	0	1	–	10	–	0
+ – Conference co-champions; Rankings from AP Poll

The 1975 Rice Owls football team was an American football team that represented Rice University in the Southwest Conference during the 1975 NCAA Division I football season. In their fourth year under head coach Al Conover, the team compiled a 3–8 record.

== Schedule ==
Date	Opponent	Site	Result	Attendance	Source
September 13	at Houston*	Houston Astrodome; Houston, TX (rivalry)	W 24–7	35,585	
September 20	Vanderbilt*	Rice Stadium; Houston, TX	L 6–9	18,000	
September 27	vs. LSU*	State Fair Stadium; Shreveport, LA	L 13–16	42,000	
October 11	Mississippi State*	Rice Stadium; Houston, TX	W 14–28 (Miss. State forfeit)	18,000	
October 18	SMU	Rice Stadium; Houston, TX (rivalry)	W 28–17	18,000	
October 25	at No. 8 Texas	Memorial Stadium; Austin, TX (rivalry)	L 9–41	55,000	
November 1	at Texas Tech	Jones Stadium; Lubbock, TX	L 24–28	38,205	
November 8	Arkansas	Rice Stadium; Houston, TX	L 16–20	20,000	
November 15	No. 3 Texas A&M	Rice Stadium; Houston, TX	L 14–33	67,000	
November 22	at TCU	Amon G. Carter Stadium; Fort Worth, TX	L 21–28	12,875	
November 29	Baylor	Rice Stadium; Houston, TX	L 7–25	10,000	
*Non-conference game; Rankings from AP Poll released prior to the game

== Roster ==
1975 Rice Owls football team roster
Players
Coaches
Offense

Pos.	#	Name	Class
WR	80	Doug Cunningham	So
QB	9	Tommy Kramer	Jr

Defense

Pos.	#	Name	Class
DB	29	Larry Brune	Sr

Special teams

Pos.	#	Name	Class

Head coach

- Al Conover

Coordinators/assistant coaches

- Keith Daniels
  (Running backs coach)

Legend

- (C) Team captain
- (S) Suspended
- (I) Ineligible
- Injured
- Redshirt
