= 1975 Arkansas Razorbacks football team =

American college football season

1975 Arkansas Razorbacks football

SWC co-champion Cotton Bowl Classic champion

Cotton Bowl Classic, W 31–10 vs. Georgia
- Conference: Southwest Conference

Ranking
- Coaches: No. 6
- AP: No. 7
- Record: 10–2 (6–1 SWC)
- Head coach: Frank Broyles (18th season)
- Offensive coordinator: Bo Rein (1st season)
- Captains: Scott Bull; Mike Campbell; Ike Forte; Hal McAfee
- Home stadium: Razorback Stadium; War Memorial Stadium

1975 Southwest Conference football standings
	Conf.					Overall
Team	W		L		T	W		L		T
No. 7 Arkansas +	6	–	1	–	0	10	–	2	–	0
No. 6 Texas +	6	–	1	–	0	10	–	2	–	0
No. 11 Texas A&M +	6	–	1	–	0	10	–	2	–	0
Texas Tech	4	–	3	–	0	6	–	5	–	0
Baylor	2	–	5	–	0	3	–	6	–	2
SMU	2	–	5	–	0	4	–	7	–	0
Rice	1	–	6	–	0	2	–	9	–	0
TCU	1	–	6	–	0	1	–	10	–	0
+ – Conference co-champions; Rankings from AP Poll

The 1975 Arkansas Razorbacks football team represented the University of Arkansas in the Southwest Conference (SWC) during the 1975 NCAA Division I football season. In their 18th year under head coach Frank Broyles, the Razorbacks compiled a 10–2 record (6–1 against SWC opponents), finished in a three-way tie for first place in the SWC, and outscored their opponents by a combined total of 336 to 123. The Razorbacks' only regular season losses were to Oklahoma State and Texas. The team went on to defeat Georgia in the 1976 Cotton Bowl Classic by a 31–10 score, and was ranked No. 7 in the final AP poll.

== Schedule ==
Date	Opponent	Rank	Site	TV	Result	Attendance	Source
September 13	Air Force*		War Memorial Stadium; Little Rock, AR		W 35–0	53,500	
September 20	at Oklahoma State*	No. 16	Lewis Field; Stillwater, OK		L 13–20	47,500	
September 27	Tulsa*		Razorback Stadium; Fayetteville, AR		W 31–15	38,000	
October 4	TCU		War Memorial Stadium; Little Rock, AR		W 19–8	51,250	
October 11	at Baylor		Baylor Stadium; Waco, TX		W 41–3	47,300	
October 18	No. 8 Texas	No. 20	Razorback Stadium; Fayetteville, AR (rivalry)	ABC	L 18–24	43,860	
October 25	Utah State*		War Memorial Stadium; Little Rock, AR		W 31–0	44,265	
November 8	at Rice		Rice Stadium; Houston, TX		W 20–16	20,000	
November 15	at SMU		Cotton Bowl; Dallas, TX		W 35–7	21,880	
November 22	Texas Tech	No. 19	Razorback Stadium; Fayetteville, AR (rivalry)		W 31–14	36,600	
December 6	No. 2 Texas A&M	No. 19	War Memorial Stadium; Little Rock, AR (rivalry)	ABC	W 31–6	52,000	
January 1	vs. No. 12 Georgia*	No. 18	Cotton Bowl; Dallas, TX (Cotton Bowl Classic)	CBS	W 31–10	74,500	
*Non-conference game; Rankings from AP Poll released prior to the game

== Game summaries ==
=== Baylor ===
Team	1	2	3	4	Total
• Arkansas	7	14	14	6	41
Baylor	0	3	0	0	3

- Date: October 11
- Location: Floyd Casey Stadium • Waco, Texas
- Game attendance: 47,200

Scoring summary
1	ARK	Bull 4-yard run (Little kick)	Arkansas 7-0
2	BAY	Hicks 19-yard field goal	Arkansas 7-3
2	ARK	Eckwood 1-yard run (Little kick)	Arkansas 14-3
2	ARK	Forte 2-yard run (Little kick)	Arkansas 21-3
3	ARK	Bull 67-yard run (Little kick)	Arkansas 28-3
3	ARK	Forte 8-yard run (Little kick)	Arkansas 35-3
4	ARK	Cowins 1-yard run (run failed)	Arkansas 41-3

=== SMU ===
Team	1	2	3	4	Total
• Arkansas	7	7	7	14	35
SMU	0	0	0	7	7

- Date: November 15
- Location: Cotton Bowl, Dallas, Texas
- Game attendance: 21,880

Scoring summary
Q1	ARK	Forte 38 yard run (Little kick)	ARK 7–0
Q2	ARK	Bull 1 yard run (Little kick)	ARK 14–0
Q3	ARK	Cowins 3 yard run (Little kick)	ARK 21–0
Q4	ARK	Forrest 12 yard run (Little kick)	ARK 28–0
Q4	ARK	Dailey 10 yard pass from Calcagni (Little kick)	ARK 35–0
Q4	SMU	Bonilla yard run (Embier kick)	ARK 35–7

=== Texas A&M ===
#2 Texas A&M at #18 Arkansas

Team	1	2	3	4	Total
Texas A&M	0	0	0	6	6
• Arkansas	0	7	17	7	31

- Date: Saturday, December 6
- Location: War Memorial Stadium, Little Rock, Arkansas
- TV announcers (ABC): Keith Jackson, Bud Wilkinson
- Source: Palm Beach Post

Scoring summary
2	0:34	ARK	Barnes 28-yard pass from Bull (Little kick)	ARK 7-0
3	6:48	ARK	Forrest 7-yard run (Little kick)	ARK 14-0
3	4:57	ARK	Little 33-yard field goal	ARK 17-0
3	0:49	ARK	Meadors recovered fumble in end zone (Little kick)	ARK 24-0
4	7:58	A&M	Baker 24-yard run (pass failed)	ARK 24-6
4	1:59	ARK	Bull 4-yard run (Little kick)	ARK 31-6

=== Cotton Bowl ===
	1	2	3	4	Total
#18 Razorbacks	0	10	0	21	31
#12 Bulldogs	3	7	0	0	10

Scoring summary

Quarter	Time	Drive			Team	Scoring information	Score	
Quarter	Time	Plays	Yards	TOP	Team	Scoring information	ARK	UGA
1			53	12	UGA	35-yard field goal by Alan Leavitt	0	3
1	7:21		58	10	UGA	Gene Washington 21-yard touchdown reception from Matt Robinson, Alan Leavitt kick good	0	10
2			-7	4	ARK	39-yard field goal by Steve Little	3	10
2			13	2	ARK	Ike Forte 1-yard touchdown run, Steve Little kick good	10	10
4			47	4	ARK	Rolland Fuchs 5-yard touchdown run, Steve Little kick good	17	10
4	9:21		30	6	ARK	Michael Forrest 1-yard touchdown run, Steve Little kick good	24	10
4	1:58		68	12	ARK	Ike Forte 6-yard touchdown run, Steve Little kick good	31	10
"TOP" = time of possession. For other American football terms, see Glossary of American football.							31	10

== Roster ==
1975 Arkansas Razorbacks football team roster
Players
Coaches
Offense

Pos.	#	Name	Class
QB	19	Scott Bull
WR	34	Freddie Douglas
RB	43	Jerry Eckwood	Fr
QB	14	Mike Kirkland	Sr
OT	68	Greg Koch
RB	85	Ike Forte
OT	74	Gerald Skinner
G	63	R. C. Thielemann
TE	81	Doug Yoder

Defense

Pos.	#	Name	Class
SS	17	Bo Busby
DT	66	Mike Campbell
DT	86	Dan Hampton	Fr
DT	72	Leotis Harris
DE	83	Ivan Jordan
FS	10	Mark Miller
CB	29	Brad Thomas
LB	55	Dennis Winston

Special teams

Pos.	#	Name	Class
K	12	Steve Little

Head coach

- Frank Broyles

Coordinators/assistant coaches

Legend

- (C) Team captain
- (S) Suspended
- (I) Ineligible
- Injured
- Redshirt
