= 1976 Cotton Bowl Classic =

- 40th Cotton Bowl Classic
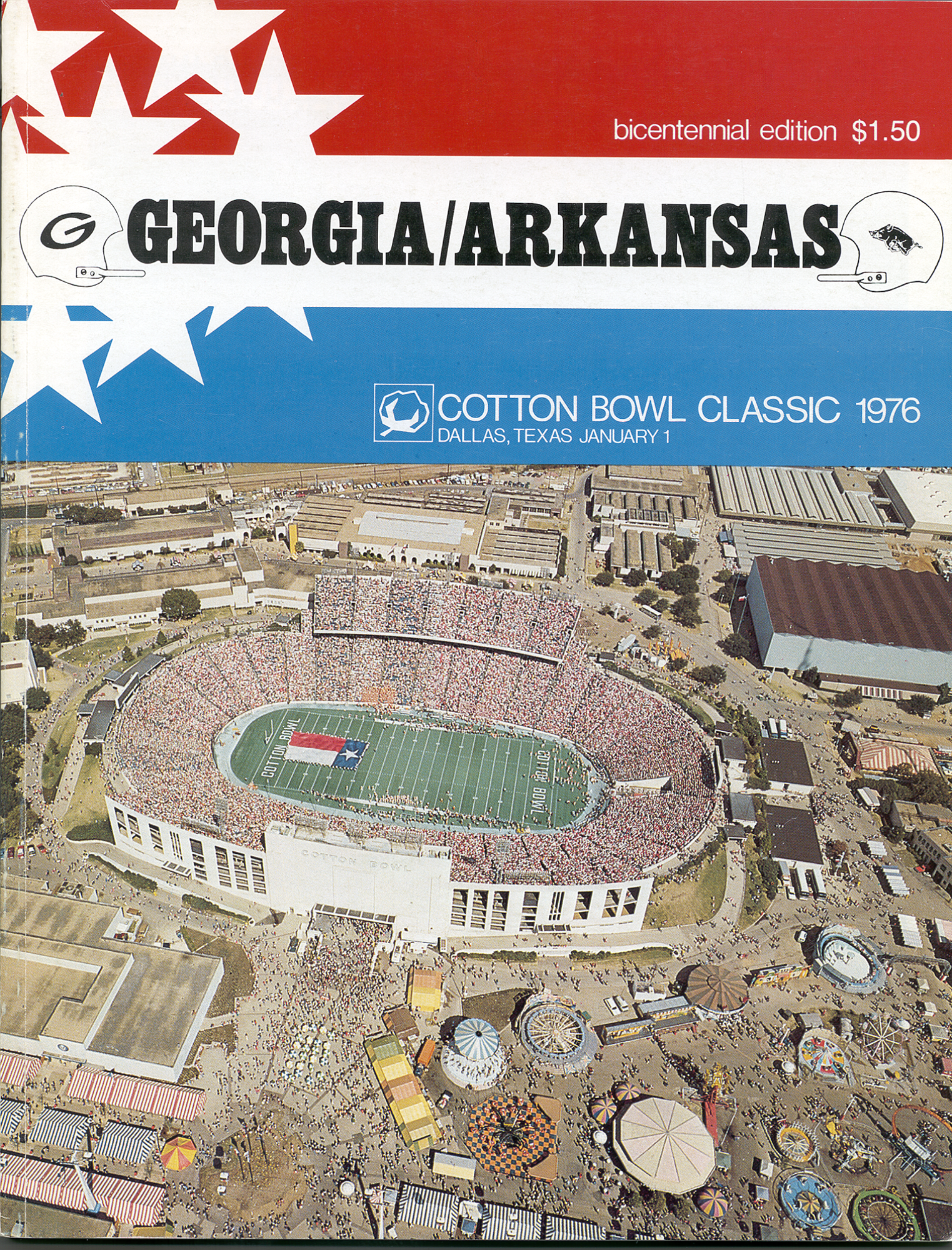
Arkansas Razorbacks	Georgia Bulldogs
(9–2)	(9–2)
SWC	SEC
31	10
Head coach: Frank Broyles	Head coach: Vince Dooley
AP / Coaches; 18 / 15	AP / Coaches; 12 / 11
	1	2	3	4	Total
Arkansas	0	10	0	21	31
Georgia	10	0	0	0	10
- Date: January 1, 1976
- Season: 1975
- Stadium: Cotton Bowl
- Location: Dallas, Texas
- MVP: HB Ike Forte (Arkansas); LB Hal McAfee (Arkansas)
- Favorite: Arkansas by 6
- Referee: Vance Carlson (Big Eight)
- Attendance: 77,500

United States TV coverage
- Network: CBS
- Announcers: Lindsey Nelson and Alex Hawkins

The Cotton Bowl in Dallas, Texas, hosted the Cotton Bowl Classic.

The 1976 Cotton Bowl Classic was a post-season college football bowl game between the co-Southwest Conference champion Arkansas Razorbacks and the Georgia Bulldogs. Arkansas defeated Georgia, 31–10 in front of 77,500 spectators.

== Setting ==
=== Arkansas ===
Arkansas finished the regular season 9–2, came into the game on a five-game winning streak. The Hogs were part of a three-way tie for the Southwest Conference Championship with Texas and Texas A&M. The Hogs lost to Texas, 18–24, but gave #2 Texas A&M its first loss in the regular season finale. The 31-6 upset of the Aggies in War Memorial Stadium is one of the most memorable games in Razorback football history.

The Razorbacks received the SWC's Cotton Bowl invitation because they had gone the longest since their last appearance, which was following the 1965 season. Texas A&M last went after the 1967 season, while Texas made six consecutive appearances from 1968-73.

=== Georgia ===
Georgia was 9–2 entering the game, tied for second in the Southeastern Conference.

== Game summary ==
The Bulldogs took an early 10–3 lead. Arkansas wouldn't score a touchdown until Georgia's QB Ray Goff tried a 'shoestring' play. He bent as if to tie his shoe and flipped the ball to Gene Washington, a legal play as long as in one motion, but Razorback Hal McAfee scooped up the ball at the 13 yard line. Ike Forte scored for the Hogs, knotting the game at 10. The two teams were scoreless in the third period, with Arkansas missing three field goals, before the Hogs exploded for 21 unanswered to close the game.

Scoring summary

Quarter	Time	Drive			Team	Scoring information	Score	
Quarter	Time	Plays	Yards	TOP	Team	Scoring information	ARK	UGA
1			53	12	UGA	35-yard field goal by Alan Leavitt	0	3
1	7:21		58	10	UGA	Gene Washington 21-yard touchdown reception from Matt Robinson, Alan Leavitt kick good	0	10
2			-7	4	ARK	39-yard field goal by Steve Little	3	10
2			13	2	ARK	Ike Forte 1-yard touchdown run, Steve Little kick good	10	10
4			47	4	ARK	Rolland Fuchs 5-yard touchdown run, Steve Little kick good	17	10
4	9:21		30	6	ARK	Michael Forrest 1-yard touchdown run, Steve Little kick good	24	10
4	1:58		68	12	ARK	Ike Forte 6-yard touchdown run, Steve Little kick good	31	10
"TOP" = time of possession. For other American football terms, see Glossary of American football.							31	10
