= Harmony Grove High School (Ouachita County, Arkansas) =

Location
- 401 Ouachita 88; Camden postal address, Arkansas 71701-9775; United States; 33°39′03″N 92°46′46″W

Information
- School type: Public comprehensive
- Status: Open
- School district: Harmony Grove School District
- NCES District ID: 0507290
- CEEB code: 040355
- NCES School ID: 050729000443
- Teaching staff: 63.28 (FTE)
- Grades: 7–12
- Enrollment: 421 (2023–2024)
  - Grade 7: 76
  - Grade 8: 60
  - Grade 9: 76
  - Grade 10: 68
  - Grade 11: 68
  - Grade 12: 73
- Student to teacher ratio: 6.65
- Education system: ADE Smart Core Curriculum
- Colors: Black, gold, and white
- Athletics conference: 3A Region 7 (2012–14)
- Mascot: Hornet
- Team name: Harmony Grove Hornets
- Accreditation: ADE
- Yearbook: The Hornet
- Communities served: Camden, Bearden, Sparkman, East Camden, Arkadelphia
- Affiliation: Arkansas Activities Association (AAA)
- Website: www.hgsd1.com/harmony-grove-high-school

Harmony Grove High School is a comprehensive public high school that provides secondary education for students in grades seven through twelve; it is located in rural, distant unincorporated Ouachita County, Arkansas, United States, with a Camden postal address. The school is often referred to as Camden Harmony Grove High School, in reference to the postal designation, to distinguish this school from another of the same name within Arkansas. It is a part of the Harmony Grove School District.

== Academics ==
The assumed course of study for students follow the Smart Core curriculum developed by the Arkansas Department of Education (ADE). Students complete regular (core and elective) and career focus courses and exams and may select Advanced Placement (AP) coursework and exams that provide an opportunity for college credit. The school is accredited by the ADE and has been accredited by AdvancED since 1989.

== Athletics ==
The mascot and athletic emblem for Harmony Grove High School is the Hornet with black, gold and white serving as school colors.

For 2012–14 school years, the school participates in interscholastic competition within the 3A Classification and 3A-7 Conference administered by the Arkansas Activities Association (AAA) in such sports as football, golf (boys/girls), basketball, baseball, softball, track and field (boys/girls), and competitive cheer.

== Notable alumni ==
- Hal McAfee—Late American football coach and player.
- Tommy Tuberville (1972)—Current U.S. Senator for Alabama; American football coach and former player.
- Corey Williams—Tackle; National Football League player.
