= Jim Shofner =

American football player and coach (1935–2021)

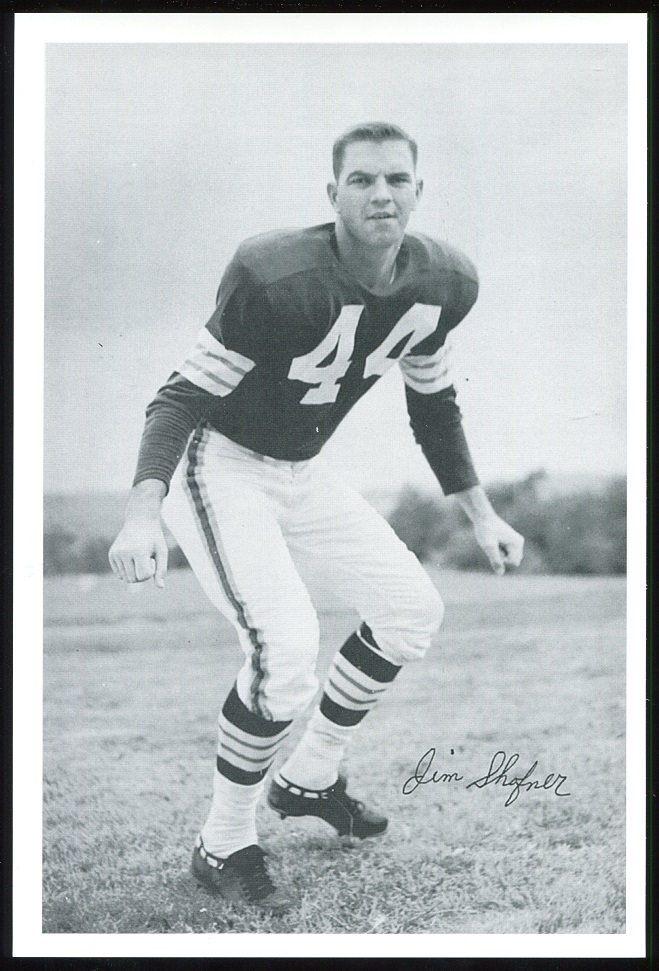
- Shofner in 1961

No. 44
- Position: Defensive back

Personal information
- Born: December 18, 1935; Grapevine, Texas, U.S.
- Died: July 17, 2021 (aged 85); Grapevine, Texas, U.S.
- Listed height: 6 ft 2 in (1.88 m)
- Listed weight: 191 lb (87 kg)

Career information
- High school: North Side (Fort Worth, Texas)
- College: TCU
- NFL draft: 1958: 1st round, 13th overall pick

Career history

Playing
- Cleveland Browns (1958–1963)

Coaching
- TCU (1966) Assistant; San Francisco 49ers (1967–1969) Defensive backs; San Francisco 49ers (1970–1973) Quarterbacks / wide receivers; TCU (1974-1976) Head coach; San Francisco 49ers (1977) Defensive backs; Cleveland Browns (1978–1980) Quarterbacks; Houston Oilers (1981–1982) Offensive coordinator; Dallas Cowboys (1983–1985) Quarterbacks; St. Louis / Phoenix Cardinals (1986–1989) Offensive coordinator; Cleveland Browns (1990) Offensive coordinator / interim head coach; Buffalo Bills (1992–1996) Quarterbacks

Awards and highlights
- First-team All-SWC (1957)

Career NFL statistics
- Interceptions: 20
- Fumble recoveries: 7
- Punts: 23
- Punting yards: 860
- Longest punt: 48
- Stats at Pro Football Reference

Head coaching record
- Regular season: NCAA: 2–31–0 (.061); NFL: 1–6–0 (.143)
- Coaching profile at Pro Football Reference

James Bernard Shofner (December 18, 1935 – July 17, 2021) was an American football player and coach at both the collegiate and professional levels. He was twice a head coach: first at Texas Christian University (TCU) from 1974 to 1976, then in an interim capacity with the Cleveland Browns of the National Football League (NFL) in 1990.

== Early life and playing career ==
Shofner was a four-sport star at North Side High School in Fort Worth, Texas, serving as captain of three squads. He played college football on both sides of the ball at Texas Christian, leading the Southwest Conference in rushing in 1957 with 682 yards, while scoring six touchdowns. He was a first round draft selection of the Cleveland Browns the following year, and after seeing little action as a rookie, became a starting cornerback in 1959.

During this period, the magic that Paul Brown had enjoyed during his first decade as head coach of the Browns had faded, with the team failing to reach the playoffs during Shofner's six years with the team. On March 17, 1964, Shofner announced his retirement, citing a business opportunity involving the insurance business in which he was involved. That opportunity apparently disappeared when Shofner signed as an assistant coach at Texas Christian, his alma mater, beginning a three-decade run in the coaching ranks.

== Coaching career ==
Shofner served for one season in his role at TCU, before returning to the NFL as an assistant with the San Francisco 49ers on March 6, 1967. Despite a head coaching change after the first season, Shofner would stay with the team for another six years, starting on defense before shifting to the offensive side. In 1970, he helped quarterback John Brodie win Most Valuable Player honors with a career year.

On December 5, 1973, Shofner was named head coach at Texas Christian, but the team endured a 20-game losing streak and Shofner won just twice in three seasons before resigning. In 1977, Shofner resurfaced with the 49ers before serving as the architect of the Cleveland Browns' offense for three seasons. During his final year with the team, Shofner watched Browns' quarterback Brian Sipe throw for more than 4,000 yards and win the NFL Most Valuable Player award.

That success resulted in his hiring as offensive coordinator of the Houston Oilers on February 4, 1981, but the team had slipped from its recent success. After two seasons, Shofner again announced he was leaving to enter private business, but instead, was hired in the same role with the Dallas Cowboys, where he spent three years.

Following the conclusion of the 1985 NFL season, Shofner was demoted by the Cowboys and left to work for the St. Louis Cardinals. Midway through his four years with the team, the franchise was relocated to Arizona, but the switch proved to have no effect on the team's dismal fortunes.

Shofner returned to Cleveland for the 1990 NFL season, but the success he had enjoyed a decade earlier was non-existent as the Browns' collapsed, resulting in head coach Bud Carson's firing on November 5. Shofner was named interim head coach, but the team won only one of the remaining seven games.

After spending the 1991 NFL season in a scouting capacity with the Browns, Shofner returned to the field in 1992 when he was hired as quarterback coach with the Buffalo Bills. During his first two seasons, the Bills reached the Super Bowl, but after a disappointing 1996 season, Shofner was reassigned to the team's scouting staff.

He died in Texas on July 17, 2021.

== Head coaching record ==
=== College ===
Year	Team	Overall	Conference	Standing	Bowl/playoffs
TCU Horned Frogs (Southwest Conference) (1974–1976)
1974	TCU	1–10	0–7	8th	
1975	TCU	1–10	1–6	7th	
1976	TCU	0–11	0–8	9th	
TCU:		2–31	1–21		
Total:		2–31			

=== NFL ===
Team	Year	Regular season					Postseason			
Team	Year	Won	Lost	Ties	Win %	Finish	Won	Lost	Win %	Result
CLE	1990	1	6	0	.143	4th in AFC Central	–	–	–	–
Total		1	6	0	.143					
