= 1975 TCU Horned Frogs football team =

American college football season

1975 TCU Horned Frogs football
- Conference: Southwest Conference
- Record: 1–10 (1–6 SWC)
- Head coach: Jim Shofner (2nd season)
- Offensive scheme: Pro-style
- Base defense: 4–3
- Home stadium: Amon G. Carter Stadium

1975 Southwest Conference football standings
	Conf.					Overall
Team	W		L		T	W		L		T
No. 7 Arkansas +	6	–	1	–	0	10	–	2	–	0
No. 6 Texas +	6	–	1	–	0	10	–	2	–	0
No. 11 Texas A&M +	6	–	1	–	0	10	–	2	–	0
Texas Tech	4	–	3	–	0	6	–	5	–	0
Baylor	2	–	5	–	0	3	–	6	–	2
SMU	2	–	5	–	0	4	–	7	–	0
Rice	1	–	6	–	0	2	–	9	–	0
TCU	1	–	6	–	0	1	–	10	–	0
+ – Conference co-champions; Rankings from AP Poll

The 1975 TCU Horned Frogs football team represented Texas Christian University (TCU) in the 1975 NCAA Division I football season. The Horned Frogs finished the season 1–10 overall and 1–6 in the Southwest Conference. The team was coached by Jim Shofner, in his second year as head coach. The Frogs played their home games in Amon G. Carter Stadium, which is located on campus in Fort Worth, Texas.

== Schedule ==
Date	Opponent	Site	Result	Attendance	Source
September 13	UT Arlington*	Amon G. Carter Stadium; Fort Worth, TX	L 7–24	17,442	
September 20	No. 18 Arizona State*	Amon G. Carter Stadium; Fort Worth, TX	L 10–33	13,122	
September 27	at No. 4 Nebraska*	Memorial Stadium; Lincoln, NE	L 14–56	75,931	
October 4	at Arkansas	War Memorial Stadium; Little Rock, AR	L 8–19	51,250	
October 10	at SMU	Cotton Bowl; Dallas, TX (rivalry)	L 13–28	15,883	
October 18	No. 5 Texas A&M	Amon G. Carter Stadium; Fort Worth, TX (rivalry)	L 6–14	34,210	
October 25	at No. 6 Alabama*	Legion Field; Birmingham, AL	L 0–45	52,000	
November 1	at Baylor	Baylor Stadium; Waco, TX (rivalry)	L 6–24	41,500	
November 8	Texas Tech	Amon G. Carter Stadium; Fort Worth, TX (rivalry)	L 0–34	18,200	
November 15	at No. 7 Texas	Memorial Stadium; Austin, TX (rivalry)	L 11–27	34,500	
November 22	at Rice	Rice Stadium; Houston, TX	W 28–21	12,875	
*Non-conference game; Rankings from AP Poll released prior to the game

== Roster ==
1975 TCU Horned Frogs football team roster
Players
Coaches
Offense

Pos.	#	Name	Class
TE	82	Bill Bishop	Jr
C	54	Jerry Cailler	Jr
QB	10	Lee Cook	Sr
QB	11	Jimmy Dan Elzner	So
WR	39	Dickey Flowers	Sr
G	68	Bryan King	Sr
G	75	Mark Krug	So
RB	22	Ronnie Littleton	Sr
OT	76	Mike McLeod	So
RB	32	Gerry Modzelewski	So
TE	87	Ronald Parker	Sr
WR	26	Mike Renfro	So
OT	78	Russell Stewart	Jr
WR	18	Vernon Wells	Jr

Defense

Pos.	#	Name	Class
DB	21	Mike Blackwood	Jr
DT	70	J. G. Crouch	Jr
DT	72	Lynn Davis	So
LB	68	Bob Dobryl	Sr
LB	43	Jerry Gaither	So
DT	79	Marshall Harris	So
LB	83	Keith Judy	Jr
DE	61	Scott O'Glee	Jr
DB	45	Tim Pulliam	Sr
LB	49	Joe Segulja	Jr
DT	66	Alan Teichelman	So

Special teams

Pos.	#	Name	Class
K	15	Tony Beasatti	So

Head coach

- Jim Shofner

Coordinators/assistant coaches

Legend

- (C) Team captain
- (S) Suspended
- (I) Ineligible
- Injured
- Redshirt
