= 1975 SMU Mustangs football team =

American college football season

1975 SMU Mustangs football
- Conference: Southwest Conference
- Record: 4–7 (2–5 SWC)
- Head coach: Dave Smith (3rd season)
- Home stadium: Cotton Bowl

1975 Southwest Conference football standings
	Conf.					Overall
Team	W		L		T	W		L		T
No. 7 Arkansas +	6	–	1	–	0	10	–	2	–	0
No. 6 Texas +	6	–	1	–	0	10	–	2	–	0
No. 11 Texas A&M +	6	–	1	–	0	10	–	2	–	0
Texas Tech	4	–	3	–	0	6	–	5	–	0
Baylor	2	–	5	–	0	3	–	6	–	2
SMU	2	–	5	–	0	4	–	7	–	0
Rice	1	–	6	–	0	2	–	9	–	0
TCU	1	–	6	–	0	1	–	10	–	0
+ – Conference co-champions; Rankings from AP Poll

The 1975 SMU Mustangs football team represented Southern Methodist University (SMU) as a member of the Southwest Conference (SWC) during the 1975 NCAA Division I football season. Led by Dave Smith in his third and final year as head coach, the Mustangs compiled an overall record of 4–7, with a mark of 2-5 in conference play, placing fifth in the SWC.

Under mounting pressure, Smith resigned on December 31, and was succeeded by Ron Meyer, the head coach at the University of Nevada, Las Vegas (UNLV), then in Division II.

== Schedule ==
Date	Opponent	Site	Result	Attendance	Source
September 6	at Wake Forest*	Groves Stadium; Winston-Salem, NC	W 14–7	13,400	
September 13	at No. 19 Florida*	Florida Field; Gainesville, FL	L 14–40	55,472	
September 27	at Houston*	Houston Astrodome; Houston, TX (rivalry)	W 27–16	28,713	
October 4	No. 11 West Virginia*	Cotton Bowl; Dallas, TX	L 22–28	27,665	
October 10	TCU	Cotton Bowl; Dallas, TX (rivalry)	W 28–13	15,883	
October 18	at Rice	Rice Stadium; Houston, TX (rivalry)	L 17–28	18,000	
October 25	at Texas Tech	Jones Stadium; Lubbock, TX	L 20–37	36,020	
November 1	No. 8 Texas	Cotton Bowl; Dallas, TX	L 22–30	35,010	
November 8	at No. 4 Texas A&M	Kyle Field; College Station, TX	L 3–36	49,809	
November 15	Arkansas	Cotton Bowl; Dallas, TX	L 7–35	21,880	
November 22	at Baylor	Baylor Stadium; Waco, TX	W 34–31	27,300	
*Non-conference game; Rankings from AP Poll released prior to the game

== Roster ==
1975 SMU Mustangs football team roster
Players
Coaches
Offense

Pos.	#	Name	Class
WR	15	Kenny Harrison	Sr
WR	80	Freeman Johns	Sr
RB	25	Wayne Morris	Sr
G	65	Henry Sheppard	Sr
QB	12	Ricky Wesson	Jr
SR	81	Gene Ratliff	Fr
S	40	Arthur Whittington	So

Defense

Pos.	#	Name	Class

Special teams

Pos.	#	Name	Class

Head coach

- Dave Smith

Coordinators/assistant coaches

Legend

- (C) Team captain
- (S) Suspended
- (I) Ineligible
- Injured
- Redshirt
