= 1975 Baylor Bears football team =

American college football season

1975 Baylor Bears football
- Conference: Southwest Conference
- Record: 3–6–2 (2–5 SWC)
- Head coach: Grant Teaff (4th season)
- Offensive coordinator: Bill Yung (2nd season)
- Home stadium: Baylor Stadium

1975 Southwest Conference football standings
| | Conf. | | | | | Overall |
| Team | W | | L | | T | W | | L | | T |
|---|---|---|---|---|---|---|---|---|---|---|
| No. 7 Arkansas + | 6 | – | 1 | – | 0 | 10 | – | 2 | – | 0 |
| No. 6 Texas + | 6 | – | 1 | – | 0 | 10 | – | 2 | – | 0 |
| No. 11 Texas A&M + | 6 | – | 1 | – | 0 | 10 | – | 2 | – | 0 |
| Texas Tech | 4 | – | 3 | – | 0 | 6 | – | 5 | – | 0 |
| Baylor | 2 | – | 5 | – | 0 | 3 | – | 6 | – | 2 |
| SMU | 2 | – | 5 | – | 0 | 4 | – | 7 | – | 0 |
| Rice | 1 | – | 6 | – | 0 | 2 | – | 9 | – | 0 |
| TCU | 1 | – | 6 | – | 0 | 1 | – | 10 | – | 0 |
+ – Conference co-champions; Rankings from AP Poll

The 1975 Baylor Bears football team was an American football team that represented Baylor University as a member of the Southwest Conference (SWC) during the 1975 NCAA Division I football season. In their fourth year under head coach Grant Teaff, the team compiled an overall record of 3–6–2, with a mark of 2–5 in conference play, and finished tied for fifth in the SWC.

== Schedule ==
| Date | Opponent | Rank | Site | Result | Attendance | Source |
|---|---|---|---|---|---|---|
| September 6 | Ole Miss* | | Baylor Stadium; Waco, TX | W 20–10 | 43,600 | |
| September 20 | Auburn* | | Baylor Stadium; Waco, TX | T 10–10 | 46,300 | |
| September 27 | at No. 9 Michigan* | | Michigan Stadium; Ann Arbor, MI | T 14–14 | 104,248 | |
| October 4 | at South Carolina* | No. 18 | Williams–Brice Stadium; Columbia, SC | L 13–24 | 44,192 | |
| October 11 | Arkansas | | Baylor Stadium; Waco, TX | L 3–41 | 47,200 | |
| October 25 | at No. 5 Texas A&M | | Kyle Field; College Station, TX (rivalry) | L 10–19 | 53,693 | |
| November 1 | TCU^{†} | | Baylor Stadium; Waco, TX (rivalry) | W 24–6 | 41,500 | |
| November 8 | at No. 7 Texas | | Memorial Stadium; Austin, TX (rivalry) | L 21–37 | 75,500 | |
| November 15 | at Texas Tech | | Jones Stadium; Lubbock, TX (rivalry) | L 10–33 | 36,594 | |
| November 22 | SMU | | Baylor Stadium; Waco, TX | L 31–34 | 27,300 | |
| November 29 | at Rice | | Rice Stadium; Houston, TX | W 25–7 | 10,000 | |
*Non-conference game; ^{†}Homecoming; Rankings from AP Poll released prior to the game
