= 1975 Texas Tech Red Raiders football team =

American college football season

1975 Texas Tech Red Raiders football
- Conference: Southwest Conference
- Record: 6–5 (4–3 SWC)
- Head coach: Steve Sloan (1st season)
- Offensive coordinator: Rex Dockery (1st season)
- Offensive scheme: Option
- Defensive coordinator: Bill Parcells (1st season)
- Base defense: 3–4
- Home stadium: Jones Stadium

1975 Southwest Conference football standings
	Conf.					Overall
Team	W		L		T	W		L		T
No. 7 Arkansas +	6	–	1	–	0	10	–	2	–	0
No. 6 Texas +	6	–	1	–	0	10	–	2	–	0
No. 11 Texas A&M +	6	–	1	–	0	10	–	2	–	0
Texas Tech	4	–	3	–	0	6	–	5	–	0
Baylor	2	–	5	–	0	3	–	6	–	2
SMU	2	–	5	–	0	4	–	7	–	0
Rice	1	–	6	–	0	2	–	9	–	0
TCU	1	–	6	–	0	1	–	10	–	0
+ – Conference co-champions; Rankings from AP Poll

The 1975 Texas Tech Red Raiders football team represented Texas Tech University in the Southwest Conference (SWC) during the 1975 NCAA Division I football season. In their first season under head coach Steve Sloan, the Red Raiders compiled a 6–5 record (4–3 against conference opponents), finished in fourth place in the SWC, and outscored opponents by a combined total of 272 to 251. The team's statistical leaders included Tommy Duniven with 1,038 passing yards, Larry Isaac with 751 rushing yards, and Sammy Williams with 496 receiving yards. The team played its home games at Clifford B. & Audrey Jones Stadium.

== Schedule ==
Date	Opponent	Site	Result	Attendance	Source
September 13	Florida State*	Jones Stadium; Lubbock, TX	W 31–20	35,268	
September 20	New Mexico*	Jones Stadium; Lubbock, TX	W 24–17	39,160	
September 27	at No. 6 Texas	Memorial Stadium; Austin, TX (rivalry)	L 18–42	77,809	
October 4	at No. 15 Oklahoma State*	Lewis Field; Stillwater, OK	L 16–17	43,500	
October 11	No. 6 Texas A&M	Jones Stadium; Lubbock, TX (rivalry)	L 9–38	52,254	
October 18	at No. 13 Arizona*	Arizona Stadium; Tucson, AZ	L 28–32	39,854	
October 25	SMU	Jones Stadium; Lubbock, TX	W 37–20	36,020	
November 1	Rice^{†}	Jones Stadium; Lubbock, TX	W 28–24	38,205	
November 8	at TCU	Amon G. Carter Stadium; Fort Worth, TX (rivalry)	W 34–0	18,200	
November 15	Baylor	Jones Stadium; Lubbock, TX (rivalry)	W 33–10	36,594	
November 22	at No. 19 Arkansas	Razorback Stadium; Fayetteville, AR (rivalry)	L 14–31	36,600	
*Non-conference game; ^{†}Homecoming; Rankings from AP Poll released prior to the game
