= 1975 Texas Longhorns football team =

American college football season

1975 Texas Longhorns football

SWC co-champion Astro-Bluebonnet Bowl champion

Astro-Bluebonnet Bowl, W 38–21 vs. Colorado
- Conference: Southwest Conference

Ranking
- Coaches: No. 7
- AP: No. 6
- Record: 10–2 (6–1 SWC)
- Head coach: Darrell Royal (19th season)
- Offensive coordinator: Don Breaux (1st season)
- Offensive scheme: Wishbone
- Defensive coordinator: Mike Campbell
- Home stadium: Memorial Stadium

1975 Southwest Conference football standings
	Conf.					Overall
Team	W		L		T	W		L		T
No. 7 Arkansas +	6	–	1	–	0	10	–	2	–	0
No. 6 Texas +	6	–	1	–	0	10	–	2	–	0
No. 11 Texas A&M +	6	–	1	–	0	10	–	2	–	0
Texas Tech	4	–	3	–	0	6	–	5	–	0
Baylor	2	–	5	–	0	3	–	6	–	2
SMU	2	–	5	–	0	4	–	7	–	0
Rice	1	–	6	–	0	2	–	9	–	0
TCU	1	–	6	–	0	1	–	10	–	0
+ – Conference co-champions; Rankings from AP Poll

The 1975 Texas Longhorns football team represented the University of Texas at Austin as a member of the Southwest Conference (SWC) during the 1975 NCAA Division I football season. Led by 19th-year head coach Darrell Royal, the Longhorns compiled an overall record of 9–2 record with a mark of 6–1 in conference play, sharing the SWC title with Arkansas. Texas was invited to the Astro-Bluebonnet Bowl, where the Longhorns defeated Colorado. The team played home games at Memorial Stadium in Austin, Texas.

== Schedule ==
Date	Time	Opponent	Rank	Site	TV	Result	Attendance	Source
September 13	6:30 p.m.	Colorado State*	No. 12	Memorial Stadium; Austin, TX		W 46–0	46,400	
September 20	2:30 p.m.	at Washington*	No. 8	Husky Stadium; Seattle, WA		W 28–10	56,000	
September 27	6:30 p.m.	Texas Tech	No. 6	Memorial Stadium; Austin, TX (rivalry)		W 42–18	77,809	
October 4	6:30 p.m.	Utah State*	No. 7	Memorial Stadium; Austin, TX		W 61–7	40,130	
October 11	1:00 p.m.	vs. No. 2 Oklahoma*	No. 5	Cotton Bowl; Dallas, TX (Red River Shootout)		L 17–24	72,204	
October 18	2:30 p.m.	at No. 20 Arkansas	No. 8	Razorback Stadium; Fayetteville, AR (rivalry)	ABC	W 24–18	43,860	
October 25	6:30 p.m.	Rice	No. 8	Memorial Stadium; Austin, TX (rivalry)		W 41–9	55,000	
November 1	2:00 p.m.	at SMU	No. 8	Cotton Bowl; Dallas, TX		W 30–22	35,010	
November 8	1:00 p.m.	Baylor	No. 7	Memorial Stadium; Austin, TX (rivalry)		W 37–21	75,500	
November 15	2:30 p.m.	TCU	No. 7	Memorial Stadium; Austin, TX (rivalry)		W 27–11	34,500	
November 28	2:30 p.m.	at No. 2 Texas A&M	No. 5	Kyle Field; College Station, TX (rivalry)	ABC	L 10–20	56,679	
December 27	2:30 p.m.	vs. No. 10 Colorado*	No. 9	Houston Astrodome; Houston, TX (Astro-Bluebonnet Bowl)	ABC	W 38–21	52,748	
*Non-conference game; Rankings from AP Poll released prior to the game; All times are in Central time

== Game summaries ==
=== Utah State ===
Team	1	2	3	4	Total
Utah St	0	7	0	0	7
• Texas	21	14	13	13	61

- Date: October 4
- Location: Memorial Stadium
- Game attendance: 41,100

Scoring summary
Q1	TEX	Campbell 40 yard run (Erxleben kick)	TEX 7–0
Q1	TEX	Wyatt 5 yard run (Erxleben kick)	TEX 14–0
Q1	TEX	Akins 6 yard run (Erxleben kick)	TEX 21–0
Q2	TEX	Jackson 29 yard pass from Constanzo (Erxleben kick)	TEX 28–0
Q2	USU	Glammona 2 yard run (Mayes kick)	TEX 28–7
Q2	TEX	Constanzo 5 yard run (Erxleben kick)	TEX 35–7
Q3	TEX	Rowan 1 yard run (kick failed)	TEX 41–7
Q3	TEX	Scott 4 yard run (Akins kick)	TEX 48–7
Q4	TEX	Gerdes 17 yard pass from Constanzo (Akins kick)	TEX 55–7
Q4	TEX	Scott 5 yard run (kick failed)	TEX 61–7

=== TCU ===
TCU vs #7 Texas

Team	1	2	3	4	Total
TCU	0	3	0	8	11
• Texas	14	0	6	7	27

- Date: November 15
- Location: Memorial Stadium, Austin, Texas
- Game start: 2:30 pm
- Game weather: Temperature: 73 deg. Wind: S 15 mph Weather: 40% humidity

Scoring summary
Q1	TEX	Walker 20 yard run (Erxleben kick)	TEX 7–0
Q1	TEX	Campbell 7 yard run (Erxleben kick)	TEX 14–0
Q2	TCU	Biasatti 27 yard field goal	TEX 14–3
Q3	TEX	Erxleben 48 yard field goal	TEX 17–3
Q3	TEX	Erxleben 22 yard field goal	TEX 20–3
Q4	TEX	Wyatt 13 yard run (Erxleben kick)	TEX 27–3
Q4	TCU	Cook 1 yard run (Cook run)	TEX 27–11

== Roster ==
1975 Texas Longhorns football team roster
Players
Coaches
Offense

Pos.	#	Name	Class
RB	20	Earl Campbell	So
QB	10	Marty Akins	Sr

Defense

Pos.	#	Name	Class
DL	77	Brad Shearer	So

Special teams

Pos.	#	Name	Class
K	15	Russell Erxleben	Fr

Head coach

- Darrell Royal

Coordinators/assistant coaches

Legend

- (C) Team captain
- (S) Suspended
- (I) Ineligible
- Injured
- Redshirt

== Awards and honors ==
- Bob Simmons, tackle, consensus All-American
- Marty Akins, quarterback, first-team All-American Football Writers Association of America. Southwest Conference Player of the Year, Southwest Conference Most Valuable Player, Kern Tips Award Winner, Southwest Conference Offensive MVP, Southwest Conference Offensive Player of the Year, The Darrell K. Royal Trophy, The University of Texas Most Valuable Athlete Award

== 1976 NFL draft ==
The following players were drafted into professional football following the season.

Player	Position	Round	Pick	Franchise
Bob Simmons	Guard	3	77	New Orleans Saints
Marty Akins	Defensive back	11	315	St. Louis Cardinals
Will Wilcox	Guard	13	365	Buffalo Bills
Rick Thurman	Tackle	14	388	Kansas City Chiefs
