= Corey Williams (American football) =

American football player (born 1980)

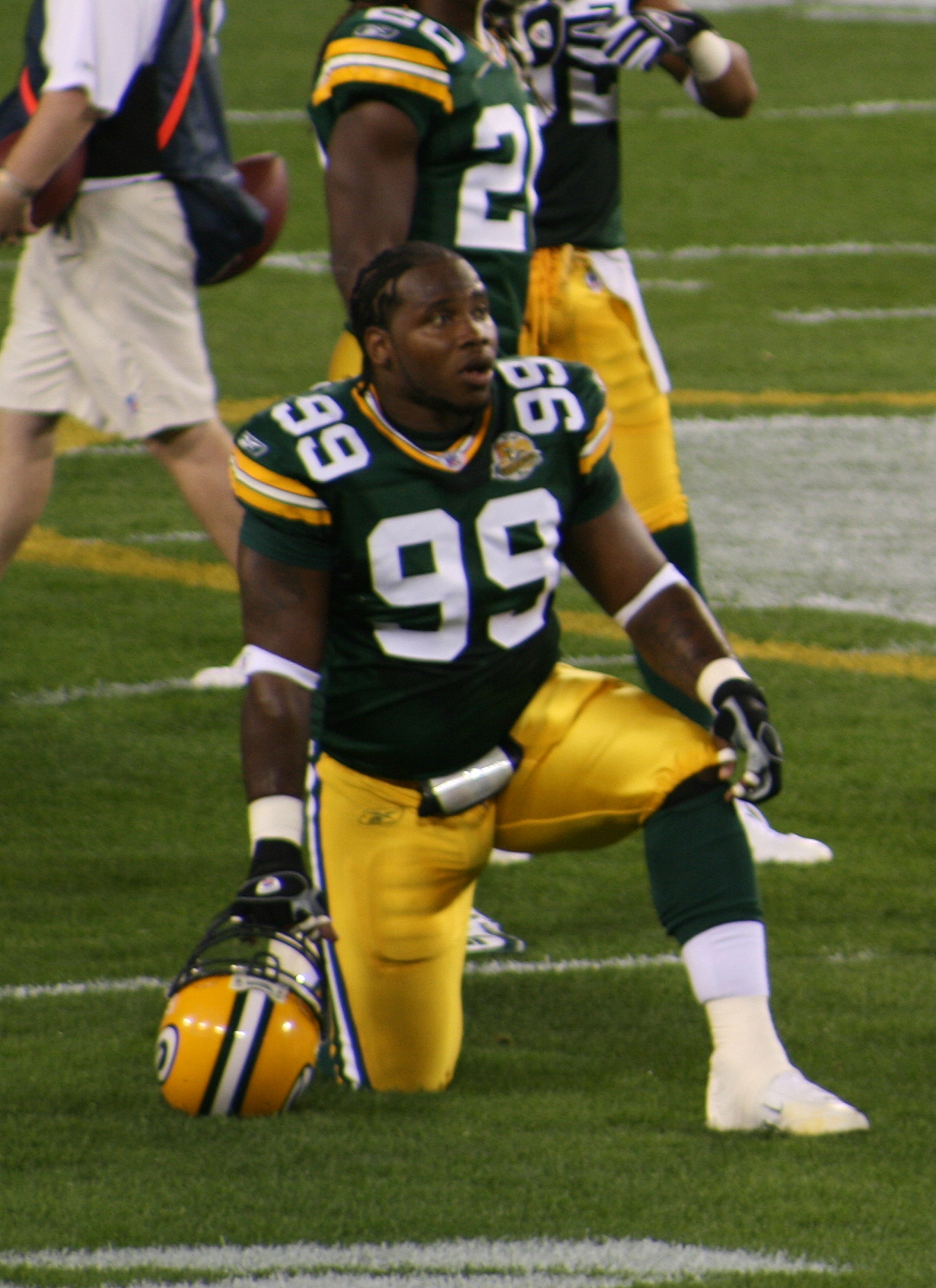
- Williams with the Green Bay Packers in 2007

No. 99
- Position: Defensive tackle

Personal information
- Born: August 17, 1980 (age 46); Camden, Arkansas, U.S.
- Listed height: 6 ft 4 in (1.93 m)
- Listed weight: 320 lb (145 kg)

Career information
- High school: Harmony Grove (Camden)
- College: Arkansas State
- NFL draft: 2004: 6th round, 179th overall pick

Career history
- Green Bay Packers (2004−2007); Cleveland Browns (2008−2009); Detroit Lions (2010−2012)

Awards and highlights
- First-team All-Sun Belt (2002); Second-team All-Sun Belt (2003)

Career NFL statistics
- Total tackles: 277
- Sacks: 27.5
- Forced fumbles: 8
- Fumble recoveries: 2
- Interceptions: 2
- Stats at Pro Football Reference

Corey Williams (born August 17, 1980) is an American former professional football player who was a defensive tackle in the National Football League (NFL). He played college football for the Arkansas State Red Wolves and was selected by the Green Bay Packers in the sixth round of the 2004 NFL draft.

Williams also played for the Cleveland Browns and Detroit Lions.

== College career ==
After graduating from Harmony Grove High School, Williams played as a defensive lineman at Arkansas State University from 2000 to 2003. He majored in sport management.

== Professional career ==
=== Green Bay Packers ===
Williams was originally selected by the Green Bay Packers in the sixth round (179th overall) in the 2004 NFL draft. In his rookie season, he played in 12 games and finished the season with 24 tackles. He made his NFL debut at the Carolina Panthers on September 13. In the 2005 season he again played in 12 games and finished the season with 34 tackles.

In a November 5, 2006 game versus the Buffalo Bills, Williams turned in the first-ever three-sack game by a Packers defensive tackle. He finished the year with career highs in sacks (7) and tackles (47).

On September 16, 2007, Williams recorded the first interception of his NFL career, returning an Eli Manning pass 9 yards in a 35–13 victory over the New York Giants.

Williams was voted the GMC Defensive Player of the Week for games played on November 18–19, 2007. Williams posted four solo tackles, two sacks and two forced fumbles during the game.

He finished the 2007 season with 51 tackles, a career-high.

=== Cleveland Browns ===
On February 20, 2008, the Packers placed the franchise tag on Williams. Ten days later, Williams was traded to the Cleveland Browns for a second-round draft pick.

=== Detroit Lions ===
On March 4, 2010, Williams was traded to the Detroit Lions along with a 7th round pick in exchange for a 5th round pick in the 2010 NFL draft.

== NFL career statistics ==
Legend
**Bold**	Career high

=== Regular season ===
Year	Team	Games		Tackles					Interceptions					Fumbles			
Year	Team	GP	GS	Cmb	Solo	Ast	Sck	TFL	Int	Yds	TD	Lng	PD	FF	FR	Yds	TD
2004	GNB	12	0	24	14	10	1.0	1	0	0	0	0	0	1	0	0	0
2005	GNB	12	0	26	17	9	2.0	4	0	0	0	0	0	0	0	0	0
2006	GNB	**16**	11	34	26	8	**7.0**	**9**	0	0	0	0	3	0	**1**	0	0
2007	GNB	**16**	9	35	26	9	**7.0**	6	**1**	9	0	9	1	**3**	0	0	0
2008	CLE	**16**	**16**	**50**	**33**	**17**	0.5	1	0	0	0	0	**4**	1	**1**	0	0
2009	CLE	**16**	2	31	27	4	4.0	5	0	0	0	0	**4**	1	0	0	0
2010	DET	**16**	**16**	37	32	5	2.0	8	**1**	**27**	0	**27**	**4**	1	0	0	0
2011	DET	15	15	31	20	11	2.0	3	0	0	0	0	0	0	0	0	0
2012	DET	7	5	9	5	4	2.0	3	0	0	0	0	0	1	0	0	0
		126	74	277	200	77	27.5	40	2	36	0	27	16	8	2	0	0

=== Playoffs ===
Year	Team	Games		Tackles					Interceptions					Fumbles			
Year	Team	GP	GS	Cmb	Solo	Ast	Sck	TFL	Int	Yds	TD	Lng	PD	FF	FR	Yds	TD
2004	GNB	1	0	5	4	1	0.0	1	0	0	0	0	0	0	0	0	0
2007	GNB	**2**	**2**	**11**	**6**	**5**	0.0	**2**	0	0	0	0	0	0	0	0	0
2011	DET	1	1	3	3	0	0.0	1	0	0	0	0	0	0	0	0	0
		4	3	19	13	6	0.0	4	0	0	0	0	0	0	0	0	0
