= Al Conover =

American football player and coach (born 1938)

Biographical details
- Born: 1938 (age 87–88); Cincinnati, Ohio, U.S.

Playing career
- 1957–1960: Wake Forest
- Position: Tackle

Coaching career (HC unless noted)
- 1963–1967: Florida State (assistant)
- 1968–1970: Idaho (assistant)
- 1971: Rice (OC)
- 1972–1975: Rice

Head coaching record
- Overall: 15–27–2

Al Conover (born 1938) is an American former football player and coach. Most notably, he served as head coach at Rice University from 1972 to 1975, compiling a record of 15–27–2 in four seasons before resigning to enter private business.

A native of Largo, Florida, Conover attended Largo High School, where he starred on the football squad and earned an athletic scholarship to Wake Forest University. He spent four years on the Demon Deacon squad, protecting quarterback Norm Snead as tackle under coaches Paul Amen and Billy Hildebrand. Returning to Largo after graduation, he served as his alma mater's head swimming coach and assistant football mentor.

In 1963, he was hired as a graduate assistant by Florida State University head coach Bill Peterson, and later became offensive line coach. After helping the Seminoles to a Gator Bowl appearance in 1967, Conover was hired by Y C McNease at Idaho. When Peterson moved on to Rice University in 1971, he hired Conover as offensive coordinator. Peterson left for the Houston Oilers one season later, and Conover was selected as his successor.

In his first year as Rice head coach, he guided the Owls to a 5–5–1 record, the program's best since 1963. Known for his flamboyance, he brought a coffin onto the practice field to "bury" the Owls' mistakes during the 1973 season. Following a 3–8 season in 1975, Conover resigned to enter private business.

== Head coaching record ==
Year	Team	Overall	Conference	Standing	Bowl/playoffs
Rice Owls (Southwest Conference) (1972–1975)
1972	Rice	5–5–1	3–4	T–4th	
1973	Rice	5–6	4–3	3rd	
1974	Rice	2–8–1	2–5	7th	
1975	Rice	2–9†	1–6	T–7th	
Rice:		14–28–2†	10–18		
Total:		14–28–2†			

† 3–8 in 1975 and 15–27–2 overall per NCAA due to forfeit win over Mississippi State.
