= Douglas Cunningham (American football) =

American football player (born 1955)

No. 89
- Position: Wide receiver

Personal information
- Born: November 14, 1955 (age 70); San Antonio, Texas, U.S.
- Listed height: 6 ft 1 in (1.85 m)
- Listed weight: 195 lb (88 kg)

Career information
- High school: Winston Churchill (San Antonio)
- College: Rice
- NFL draft: 1979: undrafted

Career history
- Minnesota Vikings (1979); Denver Broncos (1980)*
- * Offseason or practice squad member only

Career NFL statistics
- Receptions: 5
- Receiving yards: 50
- Stats at Pro Football Reference

Douglas Scott Cunningham (born November 14, 1955) is an American former professional football player who was a wide receiver for the Minnesota Vikings of the National Football League (NFL) in 1979. He played college football for the Rice Owls.
