= Hal McAfee =

American football player and coach (1953–2008)

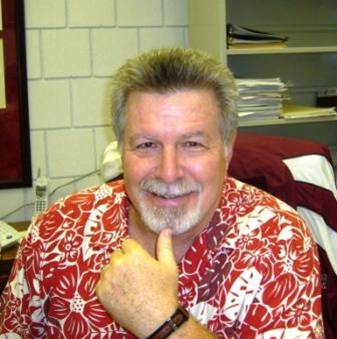

Biographical details
- Born: November 20, 1953; Arkadelphia, Arkansas, U.S.
- Died: November 22, 2008 (aged 55); Arkadelphia, Arkansas, U.S.
- Education: Little Rock (AR) Catholic

Playing career
- 1973–1975: Arkansas
- Position: Linebacker

Coaching career (HC unless noted)
- 1979–1980: Arkansas (GA)
- 1981–1982: Marlin HS (TX) (DC)
- 1983–1985: Harmony Grove HS (AR)
- 1986–1987: Tarleton State (DC)
- 1988–1992: Tarleton State
- 1996–1998: Fort Lewis (OC)

Head coaching record
- Overall: 36–18 (college); 16–12 (high school)
- Tournaments: 2–2 (NAIA D-II playoffs)

Accomplishments and honors

Championships
- 2 TIAA (1989–1990)

Awards
- Cotton Bowl Classic Defensive MVP (1976)

Harold Thomas McAfee (November 20, 1953 – November 22, 2008) was an American football coach. He served as head coach at Tarleton State University from 1988 to 1992. McAfee compiled a 36–18 overall record, including an 11–1 season in 1990, the first ever undefeated regular season in school history.

McAfee was an All-Southwest Conference linebacker at the University of Arkansas. He helped the Razorbacks to a 31–10 win over Georgia in the 1976 Cotton Bowl Classic, earning him the game's Defensive Most Valuable Player award. McAfee would eventually be named to the Cotton Bowl Classic Hall of Heroes for the 1970s and the Houston Chronicle All-Time Cotton Bowl Classic team.

He started his coaching career as a defensive graduate assistant at his alma mater before moving on to the high school level. He became defensive coordinator at the high school in Marlin, Texas, before moving on to his first head coaching job at Harmony Grove High School in Camden, Arkansas.

Returning to the college football in 1986, McAfee was hired as defensive coordinator by Bill Pringle at Tarleton State University. The Texans won consecutive Texas Intercollegiate Athletic Association (TIAA) championships in 1986 and 1987, finishing seasons 9–1–1 and 9–3, respectively.

In 1988, McAfee succeeded Pringle as head coach at Tarleton State and spent the next five years leading the team. TSU won two TIAA championships (1989 & 1990) and made it to the NAIA II National Quarterfinals twice (1989 & 1990) in those five years.

McAfee died on November 22, 2008, of a massive heart attack while exercising on a treadmill in Arkadelphia, Arkansas, where he lived. He was 55 years old.

== Head coaching record ==
=== College ===
Year	Team	Overall	Conference	Standing	Bowl/playoffs
Tarleton State Texans (Texas Intercollegiate Athletic Association) (1988–1990)
1988	Tarleton State	7–3	7–3	2nd	
1989	Tarleton State	9–3	8–2	2nd	L NAIA Division II Quarterfinal
1990	Tarleton State	11–1	6–0	1st	L NAIA Division II Quarterfinal
Tarleton State Texans (NAIA Division II independent) (1991–1992)
1991	Tarleton State	3–7			
1992	Tarleton State	6–4			
Tarleton State:		36–18	21–5		
Total:		36–18			
National championship Conference title Conference division title or championship game berth

=== High school ===
Year	Team	Overall	Conference	Standing	Bowl/playoffs
Harmony Grove Hornets () (1983–1985)
1983	Harmony Grove	5–5	3–3		
1984	Harmony Grove	7–2	4–2		
1985	Harmony Grove	4–5	3–2		
Harmony Grove:		16–12	10–7		
Total:		16–12			
