= 1975 Texas A&M Aggies football team =

American college football season

1975 Texas A&M Aggies football

SWC co-champion

Liberty Bowl, L 0–20 vs. USC
- Conference: Southwest Conference

Ranking
- Coaches: No. 12
- AP: No. 11
- Record: 10–2 (6–1 SWC)
- Head coach: Emory Bellard (4th season)
- Offensive coordinator: Tom Wilson (1st season)
- Offensive scheme: Wishbone
- Defensive coordinator: Melvin Robertson (4th season)
- Home stadium: Kyle Field

1975 Southwest Conference football standings
	Conf.					Overall
Team	W		L		T	W		L		T
No. 7 Arkansas +	6	–	1	–	0	10	–	2	–	0
No. 6 Texas +	6	–	1	–	0	10	–	2	–	0
No. 11 Texas A&M +	6	–	1	–	0	10	–	2	–	0
Texas Tech	4	–	3	–	0	6	–	5	–	0
Baylor	2	–	5	–	0	3	–	6	–	2
SMU	2	–	5	–	0	4	–	7	–	0
Rice	1	–	6	–	0	2	–	9	–	0
TCU	1	–	6	–	0	1	–	10	–	0
+ – Conference co-champions; Rankings from AP Poll

The 1975 Texas A&M Aggies football team represented Texas A&M University as a member of the Southwest Conference (SWC) during the 1975 NCAA Division I football season. Led by fourth-year head coach Emory Bellard, the Aggies compiled an overall record of 10–2 with a mark of 6–1 in conference play, sharing the SWC title with Arkansas and Texas. Texas A&M was invited to the Liberty Bowl, where the Aggies lost to USC. The team was ranked second in the nation after ten games before losing its final two contests. Texas A&M played home games at Kyle Field in College Station, Texas.

== Season summary ==
The 1975 Aggie football team started its season with ten wins. Its tenth victory came on the day after Thanksgiving Day (Friday, November 28, 1975) over the Texas Longhorns at Kyle Field before a national television audience (ABC). The Aggies were ranked second in the nation after the game against Texas, but starting quarterback Mike Jay suffered a back injury in the 20–10 win over the Longhorns. The next game came eight days later, a Saturday, December 6, matchup against the Arkansas Razorbacks that had been rescheduled from its typical early November time frame per a request by ABC Sports. With Jay injured, Texas A&M backup quarterback David Shipman was called upon to play against Arkansas, who was ranked 18th in the nation. The Aggies were trailing 7–0 at halftime and lost by a final score of 31–6.

The Aggies, Razorbacks and Longhorns all finished 6-1 in SWC play. With each team going 1-1 vs. the other two, Arkansas was awarded the berth in the Cotton Bowl since it had gone the longest since its most recent appearance (1965 vs. 1967 for A&M and 1973 for Texas).

Before the loss at Arkansas, Texas A&M had appeared headed to Dallas for New Year's Day. Instead, the sixth-ranked team faced the unranked USC Trojans in the Liberty Bowl. USC, playing in a bowl other than the Rose Bowl for the first time, had been ranked in the top five teams nationally in early November, but they struggled late in the season and came into the bowl game with a 7–4 record. The Aggies suffered a 20–0 loss and finished the season ranked #11. The 1975 Liberty Bowl was the final game for USC coach John McKay, as his success had earned him a job with the NFL expansion Tampa Bay Buccaneers.

The 1975 team was bolstered by the play of four-year starter and running back Bubba Bean, who became the first Aggie featured on the cover of Sports Illustrated. Bean was selected to play in that year's Senior Bowl, where he caught an 82-yard touchdown pass. He rushed for 944 yards on the season and scored a team-high 8 touchdowns. Bean finished his college career with 2,846 yards rushing. Bean was selected by the Atlanta Falcons with the ninth pick in the first round of the 1976 NFL draft.

== Schedule ==
Date	Opponent	Rank	Site	TV	Result	Attendance	Source
September 13	Ole Miss*	No. 8	Kyle Field; College Station, TX		W 7–0	47,021	
September 20	at LSU*	No. 11	Tiger Stadium; Baton Rouge, LA (rivalry)		W 39–8	69,445	
September 27	Illinois*	No. 8	Kyle Field; College Station, TX	ABC	W 43–13	45,524	
October 4	at Kansas State*	No. 6	KSU Stadium; Manhattan, KS		W 10–0	37,100	
October 11	at Texas Tech	No. 6	Jones Stadium; Lubbock, TX (rivalry)		W 38–9	52,254	
October 18	at TCU	No. 5	Amon G. Carter Stadium; Fort Worth, TX (rivalry)		W 14–6	34,210	
October 25	Baylor	No. 5	Kyle Field; College Station, TX (rivalry)		W 19–10	53,693	
November 8	SMU	No. 4	Kyle Field; College Station, TX		W 36–3	49,809	
November 15	at Rice	No. 3	Rice Stadium; Houston, TX		W 33–14	67,000	
November 28	No. 5 Texas	No. 2	Kyle Field; College Station, TX (rivalry)	ABC	W 20–10	56,679	
December 6	at No. 18 Arkansas	No. 2	War Memorial Stadium; Little Rock, AR (rivalry)	ABC	L 6–31	52,000	
December 22	vs. USC*	No. 6	Liberty Bowl Memorial Stadium; Memphis, TN (Liberty Bowl)	ABC	L 0–20	52,129	
*Non-conference game; Rankings from AP Poll released prior to the game

== Roster ==
1975 Texas A&M Aggies football team roster
Players
Coaches
Offense

Pos.	#	Name	Class
RB	44	Bubba Bean	Sr

Defense

Pos.	#	Name	Class
LB		Ed Simonini	Sr
LB		Garth Ten Napel

Special teams

Pos.	#	Name	Class

Head coach

- Emory Bellard

Coordinators/assistant coaches

Legend

- (C) Team captain
- (S) Suspended
- (I) Ineligible
- Injured
- Redshirt
