= 1981 Michigan Wolverines football team =

American college football season

1981 Michigan Wolverines football

Astro-Bluebonnet Bowl champion

Astro-Bluebonnet Bowl, W 33–14 vs. UCLA
- Conference: Big Ten Conference

Ranking
- Coaches: No. 10
- AP: No. 12
- Record: 9–3 (6–3 Big Ten)
- Head coach: Bo Schembechler (13th season)
- Defensive coordinator: Bill McCartney (5th season)
- MVP: Butch Woolfolk
- Captains: Kurt Becker; Robert Thompson
- Home stadium: Michigan Stadium

1981 Big Ten Conference football standings
	Conf.					Overall
Team	W		L		T	W		L		T
No. 15 Ohio State +	6	–	2	–	0	9	–	3	–	0
No. 18 Iowa +	6	–	2	–	0	8	–	4	–	0
No. 12 Michigan	6	–	3	–	0	9	–	3	–	0
Illinois	6	–	3	–	0	7	–	4	–	0
Wisconsin	6	–	3	–	0	7	–	5	–	0
Minnesota	4	–	5	–	0	6	–	5	–	0
Michigan State	4	–	5	–	0	5	–	6	–	0
Purdue	3	–	6	–	0	5	–	6	–	0
Indiana	3	–	6	–	0	3	–	8	–	0
Northwestern	0	–	9	–	0	0	–	11	–	0
+ – Conference co-champions; Rankings from AP Poll

The 1981 Michigan Wolverines football team was an American football team that represented the University of Michigan in the 1981 Big Ten Conference football season. In their 13th season under head coach Bo Schembechler, the Wolverines compiled a 9–3 record (6–3 against conference opponents) and outscored all opponents by a total of 355 to 162. Ranked No. 1 by both the AP and UPI in the preseason polls, Michigan lost to Wisconsin in its season opener, then defeated No. 1 Notre Dame the following week, and ended its season with a victory over UCLA in the Astro-Bluebonnet Bowl. The Wolverines were ranked No. 10 in the final UPI poll and No. 12 in the AP Poll.

Running back Butch Woolfolk was selected as the team's most valuable player. The team's statistical leaders included Woolfolk with a school record 1,459 rushing yards, wide receiver Anthony Carter with 952 receiving yards, and quarterback Steve Smith with 1,661 passing yards, 2,335 yards of total offense, and 72 points scored.

Five Michigan players, all on offense, received first-team All-America honors: Anthony Carter (consensus); offensive guard Kurt Becker (consensus); offensive tackle Ed Muransky (consensus); offensive tackle Bubba Paris; and Butch Woolfolk. Thirteen Michigan players were named to the 1981 All-Big Ten Conference football team.

== Schedule ==
Date	Time	Opponent	Rank	Site	TV	Result	Attendance
September 12	2:30 p.m.	at Wisconsin	No. 1	Camp Randall Stadium; Madison, WI		L 14–21	68,733
September 19	1:30 p.m.	No. 1 Notre Dame*	No. 11	Michigan Stadium; Ann Arbor, MI (rivalry)	ABC	W 25–7	105,888
September 26	1:00 p.m.	Navy*	No. 7	Michigan Stadium; Ann Arbor, MI		W 21–16	105,213
October 3	1:30 p.m.	at Indiana	No. 8	Memorial Stadium; Bloomington, IN		W 38–17	50,612
October 10	1:00 p.m.	at Michigan State	No. 6	Spartan Stadium; East Lansing, MI (rivalry)	ONTV	W 38–20	77,923
October 17	1:00 p.m.	Iowa	No. 5	Michigan Stadium; Ann Arbor, MI		L 7–9	105,915
October 24	1:00 p.m.	Northwestern^{†}	No. 18	Michigan Stadium; Ann Arbor, MI (rivalry)		W 38–0	104,361
October 31	2:00 p.m.	at Minnesota	No. 15	Memorial Stadium; Minneapolis, MN (Little Brown Jug)		W 34–13	52,875
November 7	1:00 p.m.	Illinois	No. 12	Michigan Stadium; Ann Arbor, MI (rivalry)	ONTV	W 70–21	105,570
November 14	1:30 p.m.	at Purdue	No. 11	Ross–Ade Stadium; West Lafayette, IN		W 28–10	69,736
November 21	12:00 p.m.	Ohio State	No. 7	Michigan Stadium; Ann Arbor, MI (The Game)	ABC	L 9–14	106,043
December 31	8:00 p.m.	vs. No. 19 UCLA*	No. 16	Houston Astrodome; Houston, TX (Astro-Bluebonnet Bowl)	MTN	W 33–14	50,107
*Non-conference game; ^{†}Homecoming; Rankings from AP Poll released prior to the game; All times are in Eastern time

== Season summary ==
=== At Wisconsin ===
Week 1: Michigan at Wisconsin

Team	1	2	3	4	Total
Michigan	0	7	7	0	14
• Wisconsin	0	14	7	0	21

- Date: September 12
- Location: Madison, WI
- Game attendance: 68,733

Scoring summary
Q2	9:17	MICH	Steve Smith 4-yard run (Ali Haji-Sheikh kick)	MICH 7–0
Q2	3:47	WIS	Marvin Neal 17-yard pass from Jess Cole (Doran kick)	TIE 7–7
Q2	0:02	WIS	Davis 1-yard run (Doran kick)	WIS 14–7
Q3	9:16	MICH	Woolfolk 89-yard run (Haji-Sheikh kick)	TIE 14–14
Q3	5:13	WIS	Williams 71-yard pass from Cole	WIS 21–14

On September 12, 1981, Michigan, ranked No. 1 in the preseason AP and UPI polls, opened its season losing to unranked Wisconsin by a 21–14 score in front of a crowd of 68,733 at Camp Randall Stadium in Madison, Wisconsin. Wisconsin had not scored a point against Michigan since 1976, and it was Michigan's first loss to Wisconsin since 1962.

In his first start, Michigan's sophomore quarterback Steve Smith completed only three of 18 passes for 39 yards and was intercepted three times by Wisconsin safety Matt Vanden Boom. After a scoreless first quarter, Dave Keeling of Wisconsin fumbled a punt and Michigan drove 33 yards for the touchdown, a four-yard run by Smith. Wisconsin followed with two second quarter touchdowns in the final four minutes of the half to take a 14–7 lead.

With nine minutes remaining in the third quarter, Butch Woolfolk ran 89 yards for a touchdown on an off-tackle play to tie the game at 14–14. Wisconsin retook the lead on a 71-yard touchdown pass from Jess Cole to John Williams. Neither team was able to score in the fourth quarter.

After the game, Schembechler told reporters: "Our offense wasn't any good; our defense wasn't any good; our kicking game wasn't any good, and our coaching was poor. It's a miracle we only lost by 7 points."

For the first time since 1945, Bob Ufer was not Michigan's radio play-by-play announcer. Ufer, who had announced 360 consecutive Michigan football games, was recovering from surgery to remove a blood clot and was also battling cancer. He was replaced by Frank Beckmann. Ufer died the following month.

=== Notre Dame ===
Week 2: Notre Dame at Michigan

Team	1	2	3	4	Total
Notre Dame	0	0	0	7	7
• Michigan	0	7	12	6	25

- Date: September 12
- Location: Ann Arbor, MI
- Game attendance: 105,888
- TV announcers (ABC): Keith Jackson, Frank Broyles

Scoring summary
Q2	12:08	MICH	Anthony Carter 71-yard pass from Steve Smith (Ali Haji-Sheikh kick)	MICH 7–0
Q3		MICH	Carter 15-yard pass from Smith (kick failed)	MICH 13–0
Q3		MICH	Lawrence Ricks 1-yard run (run failed)	MICH 19–0
Q4	12:35	MICH	Smith 6-yard run (pass failed)	MICH 25–0
Q4	7:42	ND	Dean Masztak 8-yard pass from Tim Koegel (Harry Oliver kick)	MICH 25–7

On September 19, 1981, Michigan defeated Notre Dame, ranked No. 1 in both the AP and UPI polls, by a 25–7 score in front of a crowd of 105,888 at Michigan Stadium.

On the opening drive, Michigan drove to the Notre Dame 14-yard line, but Ali Haji-Sheikh missed a field goal. Notre Dame then drove to the Michigan five-yard line and faked a field goal attempt on fourth down. Notre Dame completed a pass, but the receiver fell down at the four-yard line, and Michigan took over on downs. After a scoreless first quarter, Steve Smith connected with Anthony Carter for a 71-yard touchdown pass—the fourth longest pass play in Michigan history. Michigan again drove deep into Notre Dame territory before the half, but the drive ended on an interception. Michigan led, 7–0, at halftime.

At the start of the third quarter, Michigan intercepted a Notre Dame pass, drove 52 yards down the field, and scored on a 15-yard pass from Smith to Carter. On the extra point attempt, the snap bounced off B. J. Dickey's head, and Ali Haji-Sheikh's pass attempt fell incomplete. Still in the third quarter, Michigan again drove downfield, took the ball at the one-yard line on a pass interference penalty, and scored on a one-yard run by Lawrence Ricks. Michigan attempted a two-point conversion, but an end-around by Carter was stopped at the two-yard line.

In the fourth quarter, Michigan mounted a 53-yard, six play touchdown drive capped by six-yard touchdown run by Smith, and Michigan led, 25–0. Notre Dame's only scoring drive began when Joe Johnson intercepted a Steve Smith pass at Michigan's 42-yard line. After a long completion from Tim Koegel to Tony Hunter, Koegel threw eight yards for a touchdown to Dan Masztak with 7:42 remaining in the game.

Butch Woolfolk gained 139 yards on 23 carries. Aside from his two touchdown passes to Carter, Smith struggled in his second start, completing only four of 15 passes and throwing two interceptions. On defense, Michigan limited Notre Dame to 213 yards of total offense, and middle linebacker Mike Boren was selected by the ABC broadcasting crew as the Star of the Game.

After the game, Michigan coach Schembechler dedicated the game ball to radio play-by-play announcer Bob Ufer who was dying of cancer. Schembechler praised his team's performance: "This was a great win for us, because we came back from our poorest performance I can ever remember. We're not there yet -- we've got a ways to go -- but that looked a whole lot better than a week ago." Michigan's 18-point margin of victory over top-ranked Notre Dame was one of the largest margins of victory over a No. 1 team to that point in history.

=== Navy ===
Week 3: Navy at Michigan

Team	1	2	3	4	Total
Navy	0	6	7	3	16
• Michigan	7	7	7	0	21

- Date: September 26
- Location: Ann Arbor, MI
- Game start: 1:00 p.m. EST
- Game attendance: 105,213

Scoring summary
1	5:24	MICH	Butch Woolfolk 4-yard run (Ali Haji-Sheikh kick)	MICH 7–0
2	13:08	MICH	Steve Smith 2-yard run (Haji-Sheikh kick)	MICH 14–0
2	5:51	NAVY	Steve Fehr 46-yard field goal	MICH 14–3
2	0:32	NAVY	Fehr 31-yard field goal	MICH 14–6
3	9:37	MICH	Vince Bean 8-yard pass from Smith (Haji-Sheikh kick)	MICH 21–6
3	0:00	NAVY	Marco Pagnanelli 22-yard run (Fehr kick)	MICH 21–13
4	8:52	NAVY	Fehr 45-yard field goal	MICH 21–16

On September 26, 1981, Michigan defeated Navy, 21–16, before a crowd of 105,213 at Michigan Stadium.

In the first quarter, Michigan drove 46 yards on seven plays, with Anthony Carter taking the ball to the 10-yard line on a 22-yard reception. Butch Woolfolk ran four yards for the touchdown. Early in the second quarter, Michigan drove 66 yards on 11 plays, including several passes to Carter and Vince Bean. Quarterback Steve Smith scored on a two-yard option run. On Michigan's next drive, Smith was intercepted by Navy's Elliott Reagans, and Anthony Carter sustained a sprained right ankle colliding with Reagans. Carter did not return to the game. Later in the second quarter, Michigan's Tony Jackson fumbled a punt, and Navy recovered at Michigan's 35-yard line. Steve Fehr kicked a 46-yard field goal, and then a 31-yarder with 32 seconds left in the half, to narrow the lead to 14–6 at halftime.

Early in the third quarter, Evan Cooper intercepted a Navy pass and returned it to Navy's 34-yard line. Michigan scored on an eight-yard touchdown pass from Smith to Vince Bean. Navy responded with a 12-play, 94-yard drive ending with a 22-yard touchdown run by quarterback Marco Pagnanelli on the final play of the third quarter. Navy then drove 66 yards on its next possession, ending with a 45-yard field goal. Late in the fourth quarter, Navy drove 48 yards to Michigan's 22-yard line. With two minutes remaining in the game, Pagnanelli threw to a wide open Troy Mitchell in the end zone, but the pass was overthrown.

After the game, coach Schembechler said: "I don't think we were ready to play. They were the better team today. This team has not performed like a Michigan team yet. They're not hungry, and unless they become that, I don't see us winning the championship."

=== At Indiana ===
Week 4: Michigan at Indiana

Team	1	2	3	4	Total
• Michigan	7	17	6	8	38
Indiana	10	0	7	0	17

- Date: October 3
- Location: Bloomington, IN
- Game attendance: 50,612

Scoring summary
1	11:18	IND	Bob Stephenson 20-yard pass from Babe Laufenberg (Mike Greenstein kick)	IND 7–0
1	4:08	MICH	Steve Smith 3-yard run (Ali Haji-Sheikh kick)	TIE 7–7
1	0:14	IND	Greenstein 22-yard field goal	IND 10–7
2	8:57	MICH	Craig Dunaway 6-yard pass from Smith (Haji-Sheikh kick)	MICH 14–10
2	2:58	MICH	Butch Woolfolk 1-yard run (Haji-Sheikh kick)	MICH 21–10
2	0:00	MICH	Haji-Sheikh 42-yard field goal	MICH 24–10
3	5:33	MICH	Woolfolk 24-yard run (kick failed)	MICH 30–10
3	3:15	IND	Duane Gunn 48-yard run (Greenstein kick)	MICH 27–17
4	12:44	MICH	Lawrence Ricks 2-yard run (Anthony Carter pass from Smith)	MICH 38–17

On October 3, 1981, Michigan defeated Lee Corso's Indiana Hoosiers, 38–17, before a crowd of 50,612 at Memorial Stadium in Bloomington, Indiana.

On the opening possession, Michigan drove to the Indiana 29-yard line, but Stan Edwards fumbled, and Indiana recovered at its 36-yard line. Indiana quarterback Babe Laufenberg led a three-play, 65-yard touchdown drive capped by a 20-yard pass from Laufenberg to Bob Stephenson. On the next possession, Michigan drove 74 yards on 14 plays (including 55 yards by Butch Woolfolk), scoring on a three-yard run by quarterback Steve Smith. Indiana drove back down the field and kicked a 22-yard field goal to move back ahead, 10–7, at the end of the first quarter. Michigan pulled away with 17 unanswered points in the second quarter. Michigan's touchdowns were scored by Craig Dunaway on a six-yard pass from Smith and Woolfolk on a one-yard run. Ali Haji-Sheikh added a 42-yard field goal on the last play of the half.

Early in the third quarter, Indiana advanced to the Michigan five-yard line on drive that featured a 16-yard pass from tailback John Roggeman to Laufenberg. However, on third-and-goal, Laufenberg's pass was intercepted by Marion Body. Woolfolk scored on a 24-yard touchdown run, but the extra point failed due to a fumbled snap. Indiana responded with a 48-yard touchdown run on a reverse by wide receiver Duane Gunn. In the fourth quarter, Michigan drove 75 yards on 12 plays with Lawrence Ricks scoring on a two-yard run. Smith then passed to Anthony Carter for a two-point conversion.

Michigan out-gained Indiana by 597 yards to 316. Woolfolk rushed for 176 yards and two touchdowns on 26 carries. It was Woolfolk's sixth consecutive 100-yard game, tying a Michigan school record. Steve Smith completed 12 of 19 passes for 164 yards and a touchdown and rushed for 48 yards and a touchdown on 11 carries.

=== At Michigan State ===
Week 5: Michigan at Michigan State

Team	1	2	3	4	Total
• Michigan	2	14	8	14	38
Michigan State	7	10	3	0	20

- Date: October 10
- Location: East Lansing, MI
- Game attendance: 77,923
- TV announcers (ON TV): Larry Adderly, Jim Brandstatter

Scoring summary
1	MSU	Otis Grant 5-yard pass from Clark (Morten Andersen kick)	MSU 7–0
1	MICH	safety Ralf Mojsiejenko run out of end zone	MSU 7–2
2	MICH	Anthony Carter 11-yard run (Ali Haji-Sheikh kick)	MICH 9–7
2	MICH	Steve Smith 1-yard run (Haji-Sheikh kick)	MICH 16–10
2	MSU	Ted Jones 28-yard pass from Clark (Andersen kick)	MICH 16–14
2	MSU	Andersen 28-yard field goal	MSU 17–16
3	MSU	Andersen 31-yard field goal	MSU 20–16
3	MICH	Lawrence Ricks 3-yard run (Smith pass from Carter)	MICH 24–20
4	MICH	Smith 37-yard run (Haji-Sheikh kick)	MICH 31–20
4	MICH	Ricks 5-yard run (Haji-Sheikh kick)	MICH 38–20

On October 10, 1981, Michigan defeated Michigan State, 38–20, before a crowd of 77,923 at Spartan Stadium in East Lansing, Michigan. Michigan rushed for 445 yards, led by Butch Woolfolk with 253 yards on 39 carries. Michigan State quarterback Bryan Clark, the son of Detroit Lions head coach Monte Clark, completed 21 of 38 passes for 316 yards and two touchdowns, but he was also intercepted three times (one each by Tony Jackson, Mike Boren, and Jerry Burgei).

=== Iowa ===
Week 6: Iowa at Michigan

Team	1	2	3	4	Total
• Iowa	6	0	3	0	9
Michigan	0	7	0	0	7

- Date: October 17
- Location: Ann Arbor, MI
- Game attendance: 105,915

Scoring summary
1		IOWA	Tom Nichol 20-yard field goal	IOWA 3–0
1		Iowa	Nichol 36-yard field goal	IOWA 6–0
2	6:30	MICH	Anthony Carter 17-yard pass from Steve Smith (Ali Haji-Sheikh kick)	MICH 7–6
3		IOWA	Nichol 30-yard field goal	IOWA 9–7

On October 17, 1981, Michigan lost to Iowa by a 9–7 score before a crowd of 105,915, the third largest in the history of Michigan Stadium up to that time. It was Iowa's first win over Michigan since 1962.

Iowa's freshman place-kicker Tom Nichol accounted for all nine of Iowa's points, kicking two field goals in the first quarter and the game-winner in the third quarter. Nichol's first field goal was set up when Michigan's Evan Cooper fumbled a punt that was recovered by Iowa at Michigan's 38-yard line. Michigan scored in the second quarter on a 17-yard touchdown pass from Steve Smith to Anthony Carter.

Iowa's defense held Michigan to only 155 yards of total offense. Anthony Carter accounted for 91 of those yards on five catches. After the game, Iowa coach Hayden Fry said: "Nobody expected us to win today except for those guys in the next room. Hell, before this year, Michigan didn't even know we existed."

=== Northwestern ===
Week 7: Northwestern at Michigan

Team	1	2	3	4	Total
Northwestern	0	0	0	0	0
• Michigan	14	10	7	7	38

- Date: October 24
- Location: Ann Arbor, MI
- Game attendance: 104,361

Scoring summary
1	MICH	Anthony Carter, 24-yard pass from Steve Smith (Bob Bergeron kick)	MICH 7–0
1	MICH	Norm Betts, 52-yard pass from Smith (Bergeron kick)	MICH 14–0
2	MICH	Lawrence Ricks, 51-yard run (Bergeron kick)	MICH 21–0
2	MICH	Bergeron, 24-yard field goal	MICH 24–0
3	MICH	Smith, 13-yard run (Bergeron kick)	MICH 31–0
4	MICH	Ricks, 60-yard run (Bergeron kick)	MICH 38–0

On October 24, 1981, Michigan defeated Northwestern, 38–0, before a crowd of 104,361 at Michigan Stadium. Quarterback Steve Smith threw two touchdown passes and ran for a third touchdown. Lawrence Ricks rushed for 126 yards on 13 carries and scored two touchdowns, including a 60-yard touchdown run in the fourth quarter. Butch Woolfolk rushed for 106 yards on 18 carries to break Rob Lytle's Michigan career record of 3,317 rushing yards.

=== At Minnesota ===
Week 8: Michigan at Minnesota

Team	1	2	3	4	Total
• Minnesota	10	7	3	14	34
Michigan	0	7	0	6	13

- Date: October 31
- Location: Minneapolis
- Game attendance: 52,879
- Television network: ESPN

Scoring summary
1	MICH	Ali Haji-Sheikh 32-yard field goal	MICH 3–0
1	MICH	Stan Edwards 10-yard pass from Steve Smith (Haji-Sheikh kick)	MICH 10–0
2	MINN	Mike Hohensee 4-yard run (Jim Gallery kick)	MICH 10–7
2	MICH	Edwards 1-year pass from Smith (Haji-Sheikh kick)	MICH 17–7
3	MICH	Haji-Sheikh 33-yard field goal	MICH 20–7
4	MICH	Anthony Carter 25-yard pass from Smith (Haji-Sheikh kick)	MICH 27–7
4	MINN	Nick Davidson 39-yard pass for Hohensee (kick failed)	MICH 27–13
4	MICH	Lawrence Ricks 1-yard run (Haji-Sheikh kick)	MICH 34–13

On October 31, 1981, Michigan defeated Minnesota, 34–13, before a crowd of 52,875 at Memorial Stadium in Minneapolis. This was the Wolverines' final appearance at Memorial Stadium; the Golden Gophers moved into the Hubert H. Humphrey Metrodome in 1982.

Minnesota played nine men on the defensive line, seeking to stop Michigan's run game but leaving single coverage on Michigan wide receivers Anthony Carter and Vince Bean. Quarterback Steve Smith completed 13 of 20 passes for 237 yards and three touchdowns and no interceptions. Carter caught eight passes for 154 yards, including a 25-yard touchdown reception in the fourth quarter. Butch Woolfolk added 84 rushing yards on 17 carries. Stan Edwards caught two touchdown passes and rushed for 55 yards on 13 carries. Ali Haji-Sheikh also kicked two field goals. On defense, Michigan defensive backs Keith Bostic and Tony Jackson intercepted Mike Hohensee passes in the first half.

=== Illinois ===
Week 9: Illinois at Michigan

Team	1	2	3	4	Total
Illinois	21	0	0	0	21
• Michigan	7	21	14	28	70

- Date: November 7
- Location: Michigan Stadium
- Game attendance: 105,570

Scoring summary
Q1	ILL	Eason, 3-yard run (Bass kick)	ILL 7–0
Q1	MICH	Carter, 60-yard pass from Smith (Haji-Sheikh kick)	TIE 7–7
Q1	ILL	Curtis, 5-yard run (Bass kick)	ILL 14–7
Q1	ILL	D. Smith, 7-yard pass from Eason (Bass kick)	ILL 21–7
Q2	MICH	Smith, 1-yard run (Haji-Sheikh kick)	ILL 21–14
Q2	MICH	Dunaway, 9-yard pass from Smith (Haji-Sheikh kick)	TIE 21–21
Q2	MICH	Smith, 42-yard run (Haji-Sheikh kick)	MICH 28–21
Q3	MICH	Carter, 12-yard pass from Smith (Haji-Sheikh kick)	MICH 35–21
Q3	MICH	Smith, 14-yard run (Haji-Sheikh kick)	MICH 42–21
Q4	MICH	Ricks, 1-yard run (Haji-Sheikh kick)	MICH 49–21
Q4	MICH	Edwards, 7-yard run (Haji-Sheikh kick)	MICH 56–21
Q4	MICH	Rogers, 4-yard run (Haji-Sheikh kick)	MICH 63–21
Q4	MICH	Hassel, 6-yard pass from Dickey (Haji-Sheikh kick)	MICH 70–21

On November 7, 1981, Michigan defeated Illinois by a 70–21 score before a crowd of 105,570 at Michigan Stadium. Illinois took a 21–7 lead in the first quarter, but Michigan scored nine unanswered touchdowns in the remainder of the game. Anthony Carter caught six passes for 154 yards and two touchdowns. Steve Smith rushed 15 times for 116 yards and also completed 9 of 15 passes for 224 yards.

=== At Purdue ===
Week 10: Michigan at Purdue

Team	1	2	3	4	Total
• Michigan	7	0	0	21	28
Purdue	3	0	7	0	10

- Date: Saturday, November 14
- Location: West Lafayette, IN
- Game attendance: 69,736
- TV announcers (ESPN): Sam Rosen

Scoring summary
1	5:03	PUR	Tim Clark 26-yard field goal	PUR 3-0
1	1:12	MICH	Craig Dunaway 27-yard pass from Steve Smith (Ali Haji-Sheikh kick)	MICH 7-3
3	8:38	PUR	Jeff Feulner 5-yard run (Clark kick)	PUR 10-7
4	11:30	MICH	Smith 26-yard run (Haji-Sheikh kick)	MICH 14-10
4	4:32	MICH	Butch Woolfolk 1-yard run (Haji-Sheikh kick)	MICH 21-10
4	3:26	MICH	Lawrence Ricks 5-yard run (Haji-Sheikh kick)	MICH 28-10

On November 14, 1981, Michigan defeated Purdue, 28–10, before a crowd of 69,736 at Ross–Ade Stadium in West Lafayette, Indiana. The Wolverines had lost three of their last four games at Ross–Ade.

Purdue quarterback Scott Campbell fumbled on the opening drive, with Jerry Burgei recovering for Michigan. On the next play, Steve Smith threw an interception, Purdue took over at Michigan's 30-yard line, and Michigan's defense held. Later in the quarter, Purdue recovered a Steve Smith fumble at Michigan's 42-yard line and took the lead on a 26-yard field goal by Tim Clark, a kicking specialist who lost all the toes on his kicking foot in a childhood lawnmower accident. After the field goal, Michigan drove 66 yards, ending with a 27-yard touchdown pass from Smith to Craig Dunaway who was wide open at the two-yard line, aided by double-coverage on Anthony Carter. Michigan led, 7–3, at halftime.

Halfway through the third quarter, Purdue recovered a Butch Woolfolk fumble and drove 65 yards on 11 plays and retook the lead on a five-yard touchdown run by tailback Jeff Feulner. Haji-Sheikh missed a 39-yard field goal in the third quarter. Trailing at the start of the fourth quarter, Michigan rallied for three touchdowns in the fourth quarter. Early in the quarter, Steve Smith ran 26 yards for a touchdown. Woolfolk than scored on a one-yard run to cap a 13-play drive. On the next series, Keith Bostic intercepted a Campbell pass, and Lawrence Ricks scored on a five-yard run with 3:26 left in the game.

Steve Smith completed 12 of 20 passes for 196 yards with a touchdown and an interception; he also rushed for 66 yards and a touchdown on 14 carries. Carter caught seven passes for 103 yards, and Woolfolk rushed for 82 yards on 22 carries. For Purdue, Feulner rushed for 106 yards on 24 carries.

=== Ohio State ===
Week 11: Ohio State at Michigan

Team	1	2	3	4	Total
• Ohio State	0	7	0	7	14
Michigan	3	0	6	0	9

- Date: November 21
- Location: Ann Arbor, MI
- Game attendance: 106,043
- TV announcers (ABC): Al Michaels, Lee Grosscup

Scoring summary
Q1	MICH	Ali Haji-Sheikh, 19-yard field goal)	MICH 3–0
Q2	OSU	Art Schlichter, 1-yard run (Atha kick)	OSU 7–3
Q3	MICH	Haji-Sheikh, 26-yard field goal	OSU 7–6
Q3	MICH	Haji-Sheikh, 23-yard field goal	MICH 9–7
Q4	OSU	Schlichter 6-yard run (Atha kick)	MICH 14–9

On November 21, 1981, Michigan lost to Ohio State, 14–9, in front of a crowd of 106,043 persons, the second largest crowd up to that point in the history of Michigan Stadium. Michigan had been favored in the game by eight points. The game was played in snow, and the Michigan student section entertained itself throwing snowballs at the Ohio State band.

Anthony Carter returned the opening kickoff 54 yards and nearly broke free for a touchdown. Michigan drove to the Ohio State 25-yard line, but Steve Smith's pass was then intercepted by Doug Hill. Michigan's defense held, and Anthony Carter returned the Buckeyes' punt 18 yards to the Ohio State 29-yard line. Michigan drove inside the 10-yard line but settled for a 19-yard field goal by Ali Haji-Sheikh. Late in the first half, Ohio State linebacker Marcus Marek intercepted a second pass by Smith, this time at the Ohio State 18-yard line. After the interception, Ohio State quarterback Art Schlichter led the Buckeyes on an 82-yard drive ending in a one-yard quarterback sneak by Schlichter. Ohio State led, 7–3, at halftime.

In the third quarter, Michigan mounted two drives inside Ohio State's 10-yard line, but in both cases settled for Haji-Sheikh field goals. At the start of the fourth quarter, Michigan led by a 9–7 score. In the fourth quarter, Michigan drove down the field and had a first-and-goal from the eight-yard line, but Smith's pass on third down was intercepted by Kelvin Bell of Ohio State. After the interception, Schlichter led Ohio State on an 80-yard drive, ending with a six-yard touchdown scramble by Schlichter with 2:50 left in the game. At the end of the game, the Ohio State carried coach Earle Bruce off the field.

Michigan out-gained Ohio State by 367 yards to 257, but failed to convert on key scoring opportunities. After the game, coach Schembechler said: "We just haven't done a good job offensively. We played hard and the defense played well. They only had two drives on us. Other than that, they didn't do anything. We shouldn't have lost. This is one game we should have won."

Schlichter, in his final game for Ohio State, completed 12 of 24 passes with two interceptions and had the two rushing touchdowns, while Steve Smith completed only 9 of 26 passes and threw three interceptions, each time after Michigan had driven deep into Ohio State territory. Butch Woolfolk totaled 84 rushing yards on 18 carries, but was responsible for a turnover on a third-quarter fumble. Tim Spencer led the Ohio State backs with 110 yards on 25 carries. Anthony Carter caught four passes for 52 yards. Linebacker Marcus Marek led the Ohio State defense with 12 solo tackles and an interception.

=== Astro-Bluebonnet Bowl ===
Team	1	2	3	4	Total
• Michigan	10	0	3	20	33
UCLA	0	0	7	7	14

- Date: December 31
- Location: Houston
- Game attendance: 40,309

Scoring summary
Q1	MICH	Ali Haji-Sheikh, 24-yard field goal	MICH 3–0
Q1	Iowa	Anthony Carter, 50-yard pass from Steve Smith (Haji-Sheikh kick)	MICH 10–0
Q3	UCLA	Jojo Townsell, 17-yard pass from Tom Ramsey (Norm Johnson converts kick)	MICH 10–7
Q3	MICH	Haji-Sheikh, 47-yard field goal	MICH 13–7
Q4	MICH	Butch Woolfolk, 1-yard run (run failed)	MICH 19–7
Q4	UCLA	Tim Wrightman, 9-yard pass from Ramsey (Johnson kick)	MICH 19–14
Q4	MICH	Smith, 9-yard run (Haji-Sheikh kick)	MICH 26–14
Q4	MICH	B. J. Dickey, 5-yard run (Haji-Sheikh kick)	MICH 33–14

On December 31, 1981, Michigan, ranked No. 16 in the AP Poll, defeated No. 19 UCLA, 33–14, in the 1981 Astro-Bluebonnet Bowl, played before a crowd of 40,309 at the Houston Astrodome. The Wolverines won their second bowl game of 1981, having earlier defeated Washington in the Rose Bowl on New Year's Day.

In the first quarter, Butch Woolfolk ran for 52 yards to the UCLA 25-yard line and then drove to the seven-yard line. The drive ended with 24-yard field goal by Ali Haji-Sheikh. On the next Michigan possession, quarterback Steve Smith threw a 50-yard touchdown pass to Anthony Carter. Michigan's defense was otherwise stymied in the first half by a record 12 penalties for 118 yards, including an unsportsmanlike conduct infraction against the Michigan bench (announced in the press box as "illegal use of the mouth"). Michigan's defense held UCLA to a total of 58 yards (only five rushing) in the first half, and Paul Girgash intercepted a Tom Ramsey pass. Both team missed field goals in the half, including a 53-yard attempt by Haji-Sheikh as the half ended. Michigan led, 10–0, at halftime.

Early in the third quarter, Anthony Carter fumbled a punt, and UCLA's Don Rogers recovered the ball at the Michigan 19-yard line. Ramsey threw a 17-yard pass to JoJo Townsell, and Michigan's lead was narrowed to 10–7. Shortly thereafter, Haji-Sheikh kicked a 47-yard field goal for Michigan. At the start of the fourth quarter, Michigan drove 74 yards capped by a one-yard touchdown run by Woolfolk. Michigan's two-point conversion failed, and the Wolverines led, 19–7. With seven-and-a-half minutes left in the game, Ramsey threw a nine-yard touchdown pass to Tim Wrightman to narrow the lead to five points. On the next drive, Steve Smith ran nine yards for a touchdown on a bootleg to extend the lead to 26–14. Michigan scored a final touchdown on a five-yard run by backup quarterback B. J. Dickey.

In his final game for Michigan, Woolfolk rushed for 186 yards on 27 carries and was selected as the game's Most Valuable Player. The Los Angeles Times wrote: "Michigan's dominance along both the offensive and defensive lines was near total." Quarterback Steve Smith completed 9 of 15 passes for 152 yards and a touchdown. Anthony Carter caught six passes for 127 yards. On defense, the Wolverines held UCLA to only 33 rushing yards. Overall, the Wolverines out-gained the Bruins by 483 yards to 195 yards.

=== Award season ===
Michigan led the nation with five of its players, all on offense, receiving first-team honors from one or more of the selectors on the 1981 All-America college football team. The honorees were:

- Wide receiver Anthony Carter was a consensus All-American, having received first-team honors from American Football Coaches Association (AFCA), Associated Press (AP), Football Writers Association of America, United Press International, Football News (FN), Gannett News Service (GNS), Newspaper Enterprise Association (NEA), The Sporting News, and the Walter Camp Football Foundation (WCFF).
- Offensive guard Kurt Becker was a consensus All-American, having received first-team honors from AFCA, AP, FN, GNS, and NEA.
- Offensive tackle Ed Muransky was a consensus All-American, having received first-team honors from both the AP and UPI. Muransky was also recognized as a first-team Academic All-American.
- Offensive tackle Bubba Paris received first-team honors from the WCFF.
- Running back Butch Woolfolk received first team honors from FN and second-team honors from the AP and UPI. Woolfolk led the Big Ten with 1,459 rushing yards, 5.8 rushing yards per attempt, and 1,514 yards from scrimmage.

Thirteen Michigan players were selected by the AP and/or UPI as first or second-team players on the 1981 All-Big Ten Conference football team. They were: Anthony Carter at wide receiver (AP-1, UPI-1), Ed Muransky at offensive tackle (AP-1, UPI-1), Butch Woolfolk at running back (AP-1, UPI-1), Kurt Becker at offensive guard (AP-1, UPI-1), Bubba Paris at offensive tackle (AP-1, UPI-2), Stan Edwards at running back (AP-2, UPI-2), Keith Bostic at defensive back (AP-2, UPI-2), Tony Jackson at defensive back (AP-2, UPI-2), Paul Girgash at linebacker (AP-2), Don Bracken at punter (AP-2), Norm Betts at tight end (UPI-2), Robert Thompson at defensive lineman (UPI-2), and Brian Carpenter at defensive back (UPI-2).

Team awards were presented as follows:

- Most Valuable Player: Butch Woolfolk
- Hustler of the Year: Tony Jackson
- Champion of the Year: Brad Fischer
- Meyer Morton Award: Stanley Edwards
- Frederick Matthei Award: Lawrence Ricks
- Arthur Robinson Scholarship Award: Norm Betts
- John Maulbetsch Award: Tom Dixon

== Personnel ==
=== Full roster ===
1981 Michigan Wolverines football team roster
Players
Coaches
Offense

Pos.	#	Name	Class
OL	59	Art Balourdos	Fr
WR	27	Vincent Bean	So
G	65	Kurt Becker	Sr
TE	82	Norm Betts	Sr
WR	25	Fred Brockington	Sr
WR	1	Anthony Carter	Jr
TE	83	Milt Carthens	So
QB	10	B. J. Dickey	Sr
G	64	Jerry Diorio	So
C	69	Tom Dixon	So
TE	88	Craig Dunaway	Sr
FB	32	Stanley Edwards	Sr
C	51	Jeff Felten	Sr
QB	20	Brad Fischer	Sr
C	54	Tom Garrity	Sr
FB	48	Thomas Hassel	So
QB	2	Rich Hewlett	Jr
G	76	Stefan Humphries	So
FB	35	Jerald Ingram	Jr
TE	81	Eric Kattus	Fr
OT	72	Ed Muransky	Sr
OT	79	Tom Neal	Sr
OT	76	Bubba Paris	Sr
RB	46	Lawrence Ricks	Jr
RB	38	Rick Rogers	Fr
QB	16	Steve Smith	So
OT	68	Rich Strenger	Sr
C	55	Larry Sweeney	So
TB	24	Butch Woolfolk	Sr

Defense

Pos.	#	Name	Class
DB	3	Marion Body	Sr
ILB	40	Mike Boren	So
SS	13	Keith Bostic	Jr
CB	15	Jerry Burgei	Jr
CB	9	Brian Carpenter	Sr
DT	63	Winfred Carraway	Sr
DB	30	Brad Cochran	Fr
DB	10	Jeff Cohen	Jr
DT	92	Cedric Coles	Sr
CB	21	Evan Cooper	So
LB	36	Mike Czarnota	Sr
ILB	50	Paul Girgash	Jr
DB	31	Stuart Harris	Sr
DT	66	Mike Hammerstein	Fr
ILB	94	Jim Herrmann	Jr
FS	37	Tony Jackson	Sr
DT	73	Doug James	So
DB	23	Louis Kovacs	Jr
LB	93	Mike Lemirande	Sr
DB	44	John Lott	Jr
ILB	42	Mike Mallory	Fr
DT	96	Dave Meredith	So
DT	79	Clay Miller	Fr
LB	97	Ben Needham	Sr
DT	78	Tony Osbun	Sr
SS	43	Jeff Reeves	Sr
OLB	89	Carlton Rose	So
MG	53	Al Sincich	Fr
DB	6	Kevin Smith	Sr
OLB	99	Robert Thompson (C)	Sr
LB	49	Sanford Washington	Sr

Special teams

Pos.	#	Name	Class
PK	19	Bob Bergeron	So
P	28	Don Bracken	So
PK	6	Ali Haji-Sheikh	Jr
P	14	Karl Tech	Sr

Head coach

- Bo Schembechler

Coordinators/assistant coaches

Legend

- (C) Team captain
- (S) Suspended
- (I) Ineligible
- Injured
- Redshirt

=== Offense letter winners ===
- Art Balourdos, offensive line, freshman, Chicago, Illinois
- Vincent Bean, wide receiver, sophomore, Southfield, Michigan - started all 12 games at split end
- Kurt Becker, offensive guard, senior, Aurora, Illinois - started all 12 games at left offensive guard
- Norm Betts, tight end, senior, Midland, Michigan - started all 12 games at tight end
- Fred Brockington, wide receiver, senior, Detroit, Michigan
- Anthony Carter, wide receiver, junior, Riviera Beach, Florida - started all 12 games at flanker
- Milt Carthens, tight end, sophomore, Pontiac, Michigan
- B. J. Dickey, quarterback, senior, Ottawa, Ohio
- Jerry Diorio, offensive guard, sophomore, Youngstown, Ohio - started 4 games at right offensive guard
- Tom Dixon, center, sophomore, Fort Wayne, Indiana - started all 12 games at center
- Craig Dunaway, tight end, senior, Pittsburgh, Pennsylvania
- Stanley Edwards, tailback, senior, Detroit, Michigan - started 11 games at fullback
- Jeff Felten, center, senior, Centerville, Ohio
- Brad Fischer, quarterback, senior, Ortonville, Michigan
- Tom Garrity, center, Grafton, Wisconsin
- Thomas J. Hassel, fullback, sophomore, Cincinnati, Ohio
- Rich Hewlett, quarterback, junior, Plymouth, Michigan
- Stefan Humphries, offensive guard, sophomore, Broward, Florida - started 8 games at right offensive guard
- Jerald Ingram, fullback, junior, Beaver, Pennsylvania - started 1 game at fullback
- Eric Kattus, tight end, freshman, Cincinnati, Ohio
- Ed Muransky, offensive tackle, senior, Youngstown, Ohio - started all 12 games at right offensive tackle
- Tom Neal, offensive tackle, senior, Orlando, Florida
- Bubba Paris, offensive tackle, senior, Louisville, Kentucky - started all 12 games at left offensive tackle
- Lawrence Ricks, tailback, junior, Barberton, Ohio
- Rick Rogers, running back, freshman, Inkster, Michigan
- Steve Smith, quarterback, sophomore, Grand Blanc, Michigan - started all 12 games at quarterback
- Rich Strenger, offensive tackle, senior, Grafton, Wisconsin
- Larry Sweeney, center, sophomore, Alma, Michigan
- Butch Woolfolk, tailback, senior, Westfield, New Jersey - started all 12 games at tailback

=== Defense letter winners ===
- Marion Body, defensive back, senior, Detroit, Michigan - started 4 games at short cornerback, 2 games at wide cornerback
- Mike Boren, linebacker, sophomore, Columbus, Ohio - started all 12 games at inside linebacker
- Keith Bostic, defensive back, junior, Ann Arbor, Michigan - started 11 games at strong safety
- Jerry Burgei, defensive back, junior, Ottawa, Ohio - started 6 games at short cornerback
- Brian Carpenter, defensive back, senior, Flint, Michigan - started 8 games at wide cornerback
- Winfred Carraway, middle guard, senior, Detroit, Michigan - started 5 games at defensive tackle, 1 game at middle guard
- Brad Cochran, defensive back, freshman, Royal Oak, Michigan
- Cedric Coles, defensive tackle, senior, Detroit, Michigan - started 6 games at defensive tackle
- Evan Cooper, defensive back, sophomore, Miami, Florida - started 2 games at wide cornerback, 2 games at short cornerback
- Mike Czarnota, inside linebacker, senior, Detroit, Michigan
- Paul Girgash, linebacker, junior, Lakewood, Ohio - started all 12 games at inside linebacker
- Stuart Harris, defensive back, senior, Chagrin Falls, Ohio
- Mike Hammerstein, line, freshman, Wapakoneta, Ohio - started 1 game at middle guard
- Jim Herrmann, inside linebacker, junior, Dearborn Heights, Michigan
- Tony Jackson, defensive back, senior, Cleveland, Ohio - started all 12 games at free safety
- Doug James, defensive tackle, sophomore, Louisville, Kentucky - started 5 games at middle guard
- Louis Kovacs, defensive back, junior, Toledo, Ohio (father of 2012 team co-captain Jordan Kovacs)
- Mike Lemirande, outside linebacker, senior, Grafton, Wisconsin - started 2 games at outside linebacker
- John Lott, defensive back, junior, Masury, Ohio
- Mike Mallory, linebacker, freshman, DeKalb, Illinois
- Clay Miller, defensive tackle, freshman, Norman, Oklahoma - started 3 games at defensive tackle
- Ben Needham, inside linebacker, senior, Groveport, Ohio - started 10 games at outside linebacker
- Tony Osbun, defensive tackle, senior, Kenton, Ohio - started 10 games at defensive tackle
- Jeff Reeves, defensive back, senior, Columbus, Ohio - started 1 game at strong safety
- Carlton Rose, linebacker, sophomore, Ft. Lauderdale, Florida - started 4 games at outside linebacker
- Alan Sincich, middle guard - linebacker, freshman, Cleveland, Ohio - started 5 games at middle guard
- Kevin Smith, defensive back, senior, Dallas, Texas
- Robert Thompson, outside linebacker, senior, Blue Island, Illinois - started 8 games at outside linebacker
- Sanford Washington, inside linebacker, senior, Youngstown, Ohio

=== Kickers ===
- Don Bracken, punter, sophomore, Thermopolis, Wyoming
- Ali Haji-Sheikh, place-kicker, junior, Arlington, Texas
- Karl Tech, place-kicker, punter, senior, Grosse Pointe Shores, Michigan

=== Professional football ===
The following players were claimed in the 1982 NFL draft.

Player	Position	Round	Pick	NFL club
Butch Woolfolk	Running Back	1	18	New York Giants
Bubba Paris	Tackle	2	29	San Francisco 49ers
Stan Edwards	Running Back	3	72	Houston Oilers
Ed Muransky	Tackle	4	91	Los Angeles Raiders

A total of twenty-three (23) members of the 1981 Michigan football team went on to play professional football. They are: Kurt Becker (Chicago Bears, 1982–88, 1990, Los Angeles Rams, 1989), Marion Body (Michigan Panthers, 1983), Keith Bostic (Houston Oilers, 1983–88), Cleveland Browns, 1990), Don Bracken (Green Bay Packers, 1985–90, Los Angeles Rams, 1992–93), Anthony Carter (Michigan Panthers, 1983–84, Oakland Invaders, 1985, Minnesota Vikings, 1985–93, Detroit Lions, 1994–95), Milt Carthens (Indianapolis Colts, 1987), Evan Cooper (Philadelphia Eagles, 1984–87, Atlanta Falcons, 1988–89), Jerry Diorio (Detroit Lions, 1987), Tom Dixon (Michigan Panthers, 1984), Craig Dunaway (Pittsburgh Steelers, 1983), Stanley Edwards (Houston Oilers, 1982–86, Detroit Lions, 1987), Paul Girgash (Michigan Panthers, 1984), Ali Haji-Sheikh (New York Giants, 1983–85, Atlanta Falcons, 1986, Washington Redskins, 1987), Mike Hammerstein (Cincinnati Bengals, 1986–90), Stefan Humphries (Chicago Bears, 1984–86, Denver Broncos, 1987–88), Eric Kattus (Cincinnati Bengals, 1986–91, New York Jets, 1992), Ed Muransky (Los Angeles Raiders, 1982–84, Orlando Renegades, 1985), Bubba Paris (San Francisco 49ers, 1983–90, Indianapolis Colts, 1991, Detroit Lions 1991), Lawrence Ricks (Kansas City Chiefs, 1983–84), Carlton Rose (Washington Redskins, 1987), Rich Strenger (Detroit Lions, 1983–87), Robert Thompson (Tampa Bay Buccaneers, 1983–84, Detroit Lions, 1987), and Butch Woolfolk (New York Giants, 1982–84, Houston Oilers, 1985–86, Detroit Lions, 1987–88).

=== Coaching staff ===
- Head coach - Bo Schembechler
- Assistant coaches

- Bill McCartney - defensive coordinator
- Lloyd Carr - defensive backfield coach
- Milan Vooletich - linebackers coach
- Jerry Meter - defensive line coach
- Gary Moeller - quarterbacks coach
- Jerry Hanlon - offensive line coach
- Paul Schudel - offensive line coach
- Les Miles - offensive line coach
- Tirrel Burton - offensive backfield coach
- Bob Thornbladh - wide receivers coach

Michigan's assistant coaches in 1981 included six individuals who went on to success as head coaches—Miles (who won the 2007 national championship with LSU), Carr (who won the 1997 national championship with Michigan), McCartney (who led Colorado to a national title in 1990), Vanderlinden (head coach at Maryland for four years), Moeller (who led Michigan to three Big Ten championships and a No. 5 ranking in 1992), and Schudel (head coach at Ball State from 1985 to 1994).

- Trainer: Russ Miller
- Managers: John D. Carr, Charles Fromm, Thomas Luxton, Greg Pearlman, Fred Spademan, Randall Tharp

== Statistics ==
=== Rushing ===
Player	Att	Net Yards	Yds/Att	TD
Butch Woolfolk	253	1459	5.8	6
Steve Smith	134	674	5.0	12
Stan Edwards	92	446	4.8	1
Lawrence Ricks	86	413	4.8	9
Rick Rogers	22	128	5.8	1

=== Passing ===
Player	Att	Comp	Int	Comp %	Yds	Yds/Comp	TD
Steve Smith	210	97	11	46.2	1661	17.1	15

=== Receiving ===
Player	Recp	Yds	Yds/Recp	TD
Anthony Carter	50	952	19.0	8
Vince Bean	16	336	21.0	1
Craig Dunaway	11	152	13.8	3
Stan Edwards	7	97	13.9	2
Norm Betts	4	76	19.0	1

=== Scoring ===
Player	TDs	XPM	FGM	Points
Steve Smith	12	0	0	72
Ali Haji-Sheikh	0	35	8	59
Anthony Carter	9	0	0	54
Lawrence Ricks	9	0	0	54
Butch Woolfolk	6	0	0	36
