= 1981 Big Ten Conference football season =

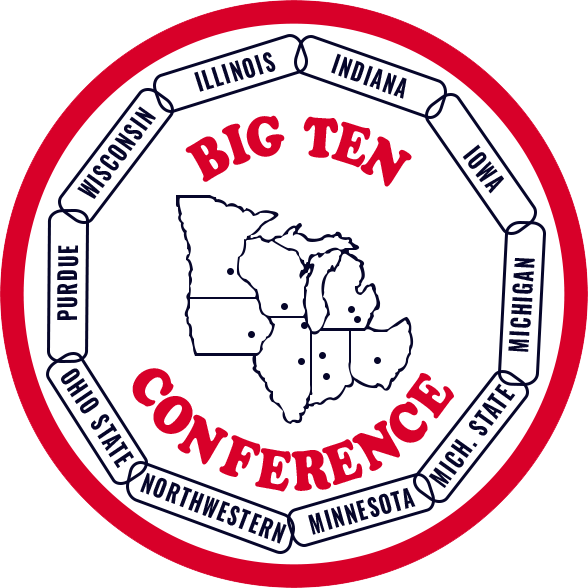
- League: NCAA Division I-A
- Sport: Football
- Teams: 10
- Top draft pick: Art Schlichter
- Co-champions: Iowa, Ohio State
- Runners-up: Michigan, Illinois
- Season MVP: Art Schlichter
- Top scorer: Bob Atha

Football seasons

1981 Big Ten Conference football standings
	Conf.					Overall
Team	W		L		T	W		L		T
No. 15 Ohio State +	6	–	2	–	0	9	–	3	–	0
No. 18 Iowa +	6	–	2	–	0	8	–	4	–	0
No. 12 Michigan	6	–	3	–	0	9	–	3	–	0
Illinois	6	–	3	–	0	7	–	4	–	0
Wisconsin	6	–	3	–	0	7	–	5	–	0
Minnesota	4	–	5	–	0	6	–	5	–	0
Michigan State	4	–	5	–	0	5	–	6	–	0
Purdue	3	–	6	–	0	5	–	6	–	0
Indiana	3	–	6	–	0	3	–	8	–	0
Northwestern	0	–	9	–	0	0	–	11	–	0
+ – Conference co-champions; Rankings from AP Poll

The 1981 Big Ten Conference football season was the 86th season of college football played by the member schools of the Big Ten Conference and was a part of the 1981 NCAA Division I-A football season.

The 1981 Big Ten co-champions were Iowa and Ohio State. In an odd twist of fate, the Hawkeyes and Buckeyes did not play each other, while all other conference teams played a full round-robin. Due to this, Iowa was awarded the Rose Bowl berth since its last appearance was in 1959; by comparison, Ohio State went to Pasadena seven times between 1969 and 1980.

== Season overview ==
=== Results and team statistics ===
Conf. Rank	Team	Head coach	AP final	AP high	Overall record	Conf. record	PPG	PAG
1 (tie)	Ohio State	Earle Bruce	15	7	9–3	6–2	32.2	21.1
1 (tie)	Iowa	Hayden Fry	18	6	8–4	6–2	21.7	13.3
3 (tie)	Michigan	Bo Schembechler	12	1	9–3	6–3	29.6	13.5
3 (tie)	Illinois	Mike White	NR	NR	7–4	6–3	26.1	26.2
3 (tie)	Wisconsin	Dave McClain	NR	14	7–5	6–3	22.3	18.2
6 (tie)	Minnesota	Joe Salem	NR	NR	6–5	4–5	24.9	24.0
6 (tie)	Michigan State	Muddy Waters	NR	NR	5–6	4–5	23.9	22.6
8 (tie)	Purdue	Jim Young	NR	NR	5–6	3–6	22.0	21.9
8 (tie)	Indiana	Lee Corso	NR	NR	3–8	3–6	13.1	26.6
10	Northwestern	Dennis Green	NR	NR	0–11	0–9	7.5	45.9

Key
AP final = Team's rank in the final AP Poll of the 1981 season
AP high = Team's highest rank in the AP Poll throughout the 1981 season
PPG = Average of points scored per game
PAG = Average of points allowed per game

=== Bowl games ===
Four Big Ten teams played in bowl games at the end of the 1981 season.

Date	Time	Visiting team	Home team	Site	TV	Result	Attendance	Ref.
January 1, 1982		Washington	Iowa	Rose Bowl • Pasadena, CA (Rose Bowl)	NBC	L 0–28	105,611	
December 31, 1981	8 p.m.	Navy	Ohio State	Liberty Bowl • Memphis, TN (Liberty Bowl)	USA Network	W 31–28	43,216	
December 31, 1981		UCLA	Michigan	Houston Astrodome • Houston, TX (Astro-Bluebonnet Bowl)	Mizlou	W 33–14	50,107	
December 13, 1981		Tennessee	Wisconsin	Giants Stadium • East Rutherford, NJ (Garden State Bowl)	Mizlou	L 21–28	38,782	
^{#}Rankings from AP Poll. All times are in Eastern Standard Time.

== Statistical leaders ==
The Big Ten's individual statistical leaders include the following:

=== Passing yards ===
1. Tony Eason, Illinois (3,360)
2. Scott Campbell, Purdue (2,686)
3. Art Schlichter, Ohio State (2,551)
4. Mike Hohensee, Minnesota (2,412)
5. Babe Laufenberg, Indiana (1,788)

=== Rushing yards ===
1. Butch Woolfolk, Michigan (1,459)
2. Tim Spencer, Ohio State (1,217)
3. Jim Gayle, Ohio State (732)
4. Phil Blatcher, Iowa (708)
5. Steve Smith, Michigan (674)

=== Receiving yards ===
1. Chester Cooper, Minnesota (1,012)
2. Steve Bryant, Purdue (971)
3. Anthony Carter, Michigan (952)
4. Gary Williams, Ohio State (941)
5. Oliver Williams, Illinois (760)

=== Total offense ===
1. Tony Eason, Illinois (3,331)
2. Scott Campbell, Purdue (2,809)
3. Art Schlichter, Ohio State (2,509)
4. Mike Hohensee, Minnesota (2,437)
5. Steve Smith, Michigan (2,335)

=== Passing efficiency rating ===
1. Tony Eason, Illinois (140.0)
2. Scott Campbell, Purdue (138.3)
3. Bryan Clark, Michigan State (128.9)
4. Steve Smith, Michigan (125.7)
5. Art Schlichter, Ohio State (123.8)

=== Rushing yards per attempt ===
1. Butch Woolfolk, Michigan (5.8)
2. John Williams, Wisconsin (5.5)
3. Tim Spencer, Ohio State (5.4)
4. Manny Henry, Minnesota (5.2)
5. Chucky Davis, Wisconsin (5.2)

=== Yards per reception ===
1. Duane Gunn, Indiana (21.2)
2. Daryl Turner, Michigan State (21.1)
3. Oliver Williams, Illinois (20.0)
4. Mike Martin, Illinois (19.7)
5. Anthony Carter, Michigan (19.0)

=== Points scored ===
1. Bob Atha, Ohio State (88)
2. Morten Andersen, Michigan State (73)
3. Steve Smith, Michigan (72)
3. Tim Spencer, Ohio State (72)
5. Steve Bryant, Purdue (66)

== All-Americans ==
The NCAA recognizes four selectors as "official" for the 1980 season. They are (1) the American Football Coaches Association (AFCA), (2) the Associated Press (AP), (3) the Football Writers Association of America (FWAA), and (4) the United Press International (UPI).

=== Consensus All-Americans ===
- Anthony Carter, wide receiver, Michigan (AFCA, AP, FWAA, UPI)
- Ed Muransky, offensive tackle, Michigan (AP, UPI)
- Kurt Becker, offensive guard, Michigan (AFCA, AP)
- Tim Krumrie, middle guard, Wisconsin (AP, UPI)
- Reggie Roby, punter, Iowa (AP, UPI)

== 1982 NFL draft ==
The following Big Ten players were selected in the first six rounds of the draft:

Name	Position	Team	Round	Overall pick
Art Schlichter	Quarterback	Ohio State	1	4
Butch Woolfolk	Running back	Michigan	1	18
Ron Hallstrom	Guard	Iowa	1	22
Bubba Paris	Offensive tackle	Michigan	2	29
