= 1981 Purdue Boilermakers football team =

American college football season

1981 Purdue Boilermakers football
- Conference: Big Ten Conference
- Record: 5–6 (3–6 Big Ten)
- Head coach: Jim Young (5th season)
- Offensive coordinator: Doug Redmann (2nd season)
- Defensive coordinator: Leon Burtnett (5th season)
- MVP: Steve Bryant
- Captains: Steve Bryant; Ray Gunner; Bobby Williams
- Home stadium: Ross–Ade Stadium

1981 Big Ten Conference football standings
	Conf.					Overall
Team	W		L		T	W		L		T
No. 15 Ohio State +	6	–	2	–	0	9	–	3	–	0
No. 18 Iowa +	6	–	2	–	0	8	–	4	–	0
No. 12 Michigan	6	–	3	–	0	9	–	3	–	0
Illinois	6	–	3	–	0	7	–	4	–	0
Wisconsin	6	–	3	–	0	7	–	5	–	0
Minnesota	4	–	5	–	0	6	–	5	–	0
Michigan State	4	–	5	–	0	5	–	6	–	0
Purdue	3	–	6	–	0	5	–	6	–	0
Indiana	3	–	6	–	0	3	–	8	–	0
Northwestern	0	–	9	–	0	0	–	11	–	0
+ – Conference co-champions; Rankings from AP Poll

The 1981 Purdue Boilermakers football team represented Purdue University during the 1981 Big Ten Conference football season. Led by Jim Young in his fifth and final season as head coach, the Boilermakers compiled an overall record of 5–6 with a mark of 3–6 in conference play, tying for eighth place in the Big Ten. Purdue played home games at Ross–Ade Stadium in West Lafayette, Indiana.

Several Purdue players ranked among the Big Ten leaders, including the following:

- Wide receiver Steve Bryant led the Big Ten with 60 receptions and 11 receiving touchdowns and ranked second with 971 receiving yards and fifth with 66 points scored.
- Quarterback Scott Campbell ranked second in the conference with 185 pass completions, a 57.6% pass completion percentage, 2,686 passing yards, a 138.3 passing efficiency rating, and 2,809 total yards.
- Running back Jimmy Smith ranked fourth in the conference with 152 rushing attempts and ninth with 540 rushing yards.

== Schedule ==
Date	Opponent	Site	TV	Result	Attendance	Source
September 12	No. 19 Stanford*	Ross–Ade Stadium; West Lafayette, IN	ABC	W 27–19	69,958	
September 19	at Minnesota	Memorial Stadium; Minneapolis, MN		L 13–16	41,530	
September 26	No. 13 Notre Dame*	Ross–Ade Stadium; West Lafayette, IN (rivalry)		W 15–14	70,007	
October 3	at Wisconsin	Camp Randall Stadium; Madison, WI		L 14–20	68,603	
October 10	Illinois^{†}	Ross–Ade Stadium; West Lafayette, IN (rivalry)		W 44–20	69,846	
October 17	at Northwestern	Dyche Stadium; Evanston, IL		W 35–0	20,777	
October 24	Michigan State	Ross–Ade Stadium; West Lafayette, IN		W 27–26	69,877	
October 31	Ohio State	Ross–Ade Stadium; West Lafayette, IN		L 33–45	69,927	
November 7	at Iowa	Kinnick Stadium; Iowa City, IA		L 7–33	60,114	
November 14	No. 11 Michigan	Ross–Ade Stadium; West Lafayette, IN		L 10–28	69,736	
November 21	at Indiana	Memorial Stadium; Bloomington, IN (Old Oaken Bucket)		L 17–20	48,466	
*Non-conference game; ^{†}Homecoming; Rankings from AP Poll released prior to the game

== Game summaries ==
=== Notre Dame ===
Team	1	2	3	4	Total
Notre Dame	0	7	0	7	14
• Purdue	0	0	7	8	15

- Date: September 26
- Location: Ross–Ade Stadium • West Lafayette, Indiana
- Game attendance: 70,007

Scoring summary
2		ND	Smith 1 yard run (Oliver kick)	Notre Dame 7-0
3		PUR	Jones 1 yard run (Anderson kick)	Tie 7-7
4	2:57	ND	Carter 30 yard run (Oliver kick)	Notre Dame 14-7
4	:19	PUR	Bryant 7 yard pass from Campbell (Bryant pass from Campbell)	Purdue 15-14

=== Ohio State ===
Ohio State Buckeyes (5–2) at Purdue Boilermakers (5–2)

Quarter	1	2	3	4	Total
Ohio St	0	17	7	21	45
Purdue	7	7	6	13	33

at Ross–Ade Stadium, West Lafayette, Indiana

- Date: October 31, 1981
- Game time: 12:30 p.m.
- Game weather: Partly sunny, 66 °F (19 °C)
- Game attendance: 69,927
- Referee: Jerry Hendrickson
- TV: ABC

Team	Category	Player	Statistics
Ohio St	Passing	Art Schlichter	19/33, 336 Yds, 3 TD, INT
Ohio St	Rushing	Tim Spencer	22 Rush, 95 Yds, TD
Ohio St	Receiving	Gary Williams	7 Rec, 126 Yds
Purdue	Passing	Scott Campbell	31/52, 516 Yds, 3 TD, 2 INT
Purdue	Rushing	Jimmy Smith	11 Rush, 33 Yds
Purdue	Receiving	Steve Bryant	10 Rec, 195 Yds, 2 TD

Scoring summary

Quarter	Time	Drive			Team	Scoring information	Score	
Quarter	Time	Plays	Yards	TOP	Team	Scoring information	OSU	PU
1	3:11	10	71	3:40	Purdue	Cliff Benson 11-yard touchdown reception from Scott Campbell, Tim Clark kick good	0	7
2	11:24	6	32	2:46	Ohio St	53-yard field goal by Bob Atha	3	7
2	8:45	2	16	0:42	Ohio St	Art Schlichter 14-yard touchdown run, Bob Atha kick good	10	7
2	6:58	1	47	0:07	Ohio St	Cedric Anderson 47-yard touchdown reception from Art Schlichter, Bob Atha kick good	17	7
2	4:38	5	70	2:20	Purdue	Steve Bryant 32-yard touchdown reception from Scott Campbell, Tim Clark kick good	17	14
3	12:24	7	80	2:36	Purdue	26-yard field goal by Tim Clark	17	17
3	10:45	9	83	1:39	Ohio St	Jim Gayle 2-yard touchdown run, Bob Atha kick good	24	17
3	2:04	6	59	1:26	Purdue	38-yard field goal by Tim Clark	24	20
4	14:45	9	75	2:19	Ohio St	Tim Spencer 2-yard touchdown run, Bob Atha kick good	31	20
4	14:32	1	23	0:05	Ohio St	Cedric Anderson 23-yard touchdown reception from Art Schlichter, Bob Atha kick good	38	20
4	9:10	15	71	5:22	Purdue	Wally Jones 1-yard touchdown run, 2-point pass failed	38	26
4	7:12	2	8	0:09	Purdue	Steve Bryant 4-yard touchdown reception from Scott Campbell, Tim Clark kick good	38	33
4	2:19	5	62	1:44	Ohio St	John Frank 29-yard touchdown reception from Art Schlichter, Bob Atha kick good	45	33
"TOP" = time of possession. For other American football terms, see Glossary of American football.							45	33

=== Indiana ===
Statistics

- Jeff Feulner 18 rushes, 108 yards

== Roster ==
1981 Purdue Boilermakers football team roster
Players
Coaches
Offense

Pos.	#	Name	Class
TE		Tom Barr
TE		Cliff Benson
WR		Steve Bryant
RB		Darryl Calhoun
QB		Scott Campbell
QB		Jim Everett
RB		Jeff Feulner
OL		Claybon Fields
OL		Jim Fritzsche
WR		Mike Fuetterer
QB		Larry Gates
OL		Ray Gunner
OL		Tom Jelesky
RB		Wally Jones
RB		Eric Jordan
FB		Bruce King
WR		Joe Linville
RB		Jim Owen
WR		Everett Pickens
RB		Robert Pruitt
WR		Dave Retherford
OL		Paul Royer
RB		Jimmy Smith

Defense

Pos.	#	Name	Class
LB		Mark Brown
LB		David Frye
LB		Andy Gladstone
DL		Matt Hernandez
DB		Bob Lashley
DB		Marcus McKinnie
DL		Casey Moore
DL		Chris Scott
DB		Tim Seneff
LB		Brock Spack
DB		Derrick Taylor
DB		Bobby Williams

Special teams

Pos.	#	Name	Class
K		Rick Anderson
P		Jim Bosche
K		Tim Clark
KR		Scott Craig
P		Matt Kinzer

Head coach

- Jim Young

Coordinators/assistant coaches

- Leon Burtnett (defensive coordinator)
- Mike Hankwitz
- Randy Hart
- Bob Spoo

Legend

- (C) Team captain
- (S) Suspended
- (I) Ineligible
- Injured
- Redshirt
