= 1982 Rose Bowl =

American college football game

- 68th Rose Bowl Game
Washington Huskies	Iowa Hawkeyes
(9–2)	(8–3)
Pac-10	Big Ten
28	0
Head coach: Don James	Head coach: Hayden Fry
AP / Coaches; 12 / 10	AP / Coaches; 13 / 11
	1	2	3	4	Total
Washington	0	13	0	15	28
Iowa	0	0	0	0	0
- Date: January 1, 1982
- Season: 1981
- Stadium: Rose Bowl
- Location: Pasadena, California
- Player of the Game: Jacque Robinson (RB, Washington)
- Favorite: Iowa by 2½ to 3 points
- Referee: Rich McVay (Big Ten; split crew: Big Ten, Pac-10)
- Attendance: 105,611

United States TV coverage
- Network: NBC
- Announcers: Dick Enberg, Merlin Olsen
- Nielsen ratings: 25.0

The 1982 Rose Bowl was the 68th edition of the college football bowl game, played at the Rose Bowl in Pasadena, California, on Friday, January 1. The Washington Huskies of the Pacific-10 Conference shut out the Iowa Hawkeyes of the Big Ten Conference, 28–0, the first in the Rose Bowl in 29 years.

Freshman running back Jacque Robinson gained 142 yards on 20 carries and set up or scored three of the Huskies' four touchdowns. A non-starter, he had entered the game in the second quarter and did not play in the third; he was the first freshman named Player of the Game. Washington quarterback Steve Pelluer was 15 for 29 passing, end Paul Skansi had four big catches, and linebacker Mark Jerue made thirteen tackles.

== Washington Huskies ==
The defending Pac-10 champion, Washington began the season ranked fifteenth. After winning their first three games to rise to #12, they were knocked off by Arizona State in Seattle, 26–7. They won their next four games, heading into crucial matchups with UCLA and USC. UCLA shut out the Huskies 31–0 in Los Angeles but Washington shut down USC and Heisman Trophy winner Marcus Allen 13–3 in Seattle. Washington then claimed the Pac-10 title by beating rival Washington State 23–10, while USC knocked UCLA out of first place with a 22–21 win in which they blocked a Bruins' last second field goal attempt.

== Iowa Hawkeyes ==
Iowa started the season by upsetting #7 Nebraska, losing to Iowa State, then upsetting #6 UCLA. The Hawkeyes took over first place in the Big Ten with a 9–7 win over Michigan in Ann Arbor, but fell to third place behind Ohio State and Michigan with back to back losses to Minnesota and Illinois. They rose back into a tie for second place when Minnesota upset Ohio State. When Ohio State beat Michigan 14–9 in Ann Arbor, that knocked the Wolverines out of first, and left Iowa and Ohio State tied atop the Big 10 standings. Because they did not play each other, Iowa was awarded the Rose Bowl berth since Ohio State had been to the Rose Bowl more recently (1980; the Hawkeyes' most recent trip was in 1959).

With an 8–3 regular season, it was Iowa's first winning record in twenty years. They were the first team other than either Michigan or Ohio State to represent the Big Ten in the Rose Bowl in fourteen years, since Indiana in January 1968.

== Scoring ==
=== First quarter ===
No scoring

=== Second quarter ===
- Wash – Jacque Robinson, 1-yard run (Chuck Nelson kick)
- Wash – Vince Coby, 1-yard run (Steve Pelluer pass to Chris James incomplete)

=== Third quarter ===
No scoring

=== Fourth quarter ===
- Wash – Robinson, 34-yard run (Pelluer passes to Paul Skansi for 2-point conversion)
- Wash – Tim Cowan, 3-yard run (Nelson kick)

=== Statistics ===
Statistics	Wash	Iowa
First downs	22	14
Total offense, plays–yards	80–328	64–264
Rushes-yards (net)	51–186	43–180
Passing yards (net)	142	84
Passes, Comp-Att-Int	15–29–1	10–21–3
Punts–average	7–36	5–47
Fumbles–lost	0–0	2–2
Turnovers	1	5
Penalties–yards	3–28	6–73
Time of Possession	33:01	26:59

== Notes ==
- First shutout since 1953, when USC defeated Wisconsin 7–0.
- Jacque Robinson became the first freshman to win the Rose Bowl Player of the Game award
- Referee Rich McVay died eight months later, suffering a massive heart attack while officiating the Michigan State-Illinois game at Champaign.
