= Robert Thompson (American football) =

American football player (born 1960)

No. 56, 59, 90
- Position: Linebacker

Personal information
- Born: February 4, 1960 (age 66); Chicago, Illinois, U.S.
- Listed height: 6 ft 3 in (1.91 m)
- Listed weight: 227 lb (103 kg)

Career information
- High school: Eisenhower (Blue Island, Illinois)
- College: Michigan
- NFL draft: 1983: 8th round, 198th overall pick

Career history
- Houston Oilers (1983)*; Tampa Bay Buccaneers (1983–1984); Detroit Lions (1987)
- * Offseason or practice squad member only

Awards and highlights
- First-team All-Big Ten (1982); Second-team All-Big Ten (1981)

Career NFL statistics
- Sacks: 2
- Fumble recoveries: 3
- Stats at Pro Football Reference

Robert Thompson (born February 4, 1960) is an American former professional football player who was a linebacker in the National Football League (NFL). He played college football for the Michigan Wolverines from 1979 to 1982 before playing in the NFL for the Tampa Bay Buccaneers and Detroit Lions.

== Early life ==
A native of Chicago, Illinois, Thompson attended Eisenhower High School in Blue Island, Illinois.

== University of Michigan ==
Thompson enrolled at the University of Michigan and played football under head coach Bo Schembechler from 1979 to 1982. In the final game of the 1980 season, Thompson helped secure the Big Ten Conference championship with a key fourth-down sack of Ohio State quarterback Art Schlichter, as the Buckeyes were driving in Michigan territory with less than a minute left in the game. The 1980 team held opponents to an average of 1.8 points per game in the final five games of the season and defeated Washington in the 1981 Rose Bowl. In four years playing football for the Michigan Wolverines, Thompson was credited with 214 tackles (including 39 tackles for loss), 188 yards on tackles for loss and 123 yards on quarterback sacks. Thompson was selected by his teammates as a co-captain for both the 1981 and 1982 football teams. In November 1982, two Michigan linebackers (Thompson and Paul Girgash) were all selected to the first team on the Associated Press 1982 All-Big Ten football team. He was also selected as a 1982 first-team Academic All-America team player.

== Professional football ==
Thompson was selected by the Houston Oilers in the 8th round of the 1983 NFL draft. He signed with the Oilers and participated in the pre-season games with the team, but he was released by Houston in the final roster cutdown to 49 players. In October 1983, he signed a contract as a free agent with the Tampa Bay Buccaneers. Thompson appeared in 10 games for the Buccaneers in 1983. In 1984, Thompson sustained two broken toes in the pre-season and began the regular season on injured reserve. He returned to the Buccaneers roster in October 1984, and played in 9 games during the 1984 season. In 1985, Thompson was part of the Buccaneers roster during the pre-season, but he was released in late August 1985.

During the 1987 NFL season, Thompson returned to the NFL as a replacement player for the Detroit Lions during the players strike. He was one of only seven replacement players on the Lions who had prior NFL experience. He appeared in all 3 games for the Lions during the players' strike. In February 1988, Thompson signed as a free agent with the Lions, but he did not make the Lions regular season roster.
