= Jim Herrmann =

American football player and coach (born 1960)

Raiders Tirol
- Title: Head coach

Personal information
- Born: December 8, 1960 (age 65); Los Angeles, California, U.S.

Career information
- High school: Divine Child (Dearborn, Michigan)
- College: Michigan

Career history
- Michigan (1985–1996) Assistant; Michigan (1997–2005) Defensive coordinator; New York Jets (2006–2008) Linebackers coach; New York Giants (2009–2015) Linebackers coach; Indianapolis Colts (2016–2017) Linebackers coach; Bowling Green (2019) Associate head coach & linebackers coach; New York Guardians (2020) Defensive coordinator; Lazio Ducks (2021–2022) Associate head coach & linebackers coach; San Antonio Brahmas (2023) Defensive coordinator; Raiders Tirol (2024–present) Head coach

Awards and highlights
- Super Bowl champion (XLVI); National champion (1997)

James Herrmann (born December 8, 1960) is an American football coach and former player. He is currently head coach of the Raiders Tirol in the European League of Football. Prior to that, he was linebackers coach for the Indianapolis Colts of the National Football League (NFL) and the Bowling Green Falcons football team. He played college football at the University of Michigan from 1980 to 1982 and served as an assistant football coach at Michigan from 1985 to 2005, including nine years as defensive coordinator from 1997 to 2005. After the 1997 Michigan Wolverines football team won the national championship, Herrmann received the Frank Broyles Award as the top assistant coach in the nation. He also served as the New York Jets' linebackers coach from 2006 to 2008. He was Defensive Coordinator for the New York Guardians and for the San Antonio Brahmas of the XFL.

== Early life ==
Herrmann was born in 1960 and raised in Dearborn Heights, Michigan. He attended Divine Child High School in Dearborn. He played defensive end for Divine Child football team.

== Playing career ==
Herrmann enrolled at the University of Michigan in 1979 and played college football as an inside linebacker for head coach Bo Schembechler's Michigan Wolverines football teams from 1980 to 1982. He started one game at inside linebacker for the 1980 Michigan team, but was otherwise a backup to Andy Cannavino, Paul Girgash, and Mike Boren. In three years at Michigan, Herrmann compiled 65 tackles and three pass breakups.

== Coaching career ==
In 1985, Herrmann returned to the University of Michigan as an assistant football coach. He was promoted to the status of a full-time assistant coach at age 29 in December 1989. His responsibilities included linebackers and special teams. In December 1996, following the departure of Greg Mattison, Herrmann took over as Michigan's defensive coordinator. In December 1997, after Michigan completed an undefeated season ranked #1 in the AP Poll, and having led the nation in total yards, scoring and pass efficiency, Herrmann won the Frank Broyles Award as the year's top assistant college football coach.

In 2004, the Michigan defense gave up 279 points (23.2 points per game), including 75 points in losses to Ohio State and Texas in the final two games. Criticism of Herrman grew during the 2005 season and became even more heated as Michigan lost five games, compiled its worst record in 21 years, and gave up 244 points in 2005 (20.3 points per game). In February 2006, Herrmann left Michigan to accept a position as linebackers coach with the New York Jets. The Michigan Daily reported at the time that it was not clear whether "Herrmann chose to leave or fled before [he] could be fired or demoted."

Herrmann served as the linebacker coach for the New York Jets from 2006 to 2008. In January 2009, he was hired as the linebackers coach for the New York Giants. On January 14, 2016, Herrmann was hired as the linebackers coach for the Indianapolis Colts.

In February 2019, he was named associate head coach and linebackers coach for Bowling Green, but instead joined the New York Guardians of the XFL as defensive coordinator.

Herrmann was officially hired by the San Antonio Brahmas on September 13, 2022

== Personal life ==
Herrmann is married to May Chamoun. Jim has three children: Jessica, Cory, and Timothy. May has one daughter: Christine.
