= 1981 Michigan State Spartans football team =

American college football season

1981 Michigan State Spartans football
- Conference: Big Ten Conference
- Record: 5–6 (4–5 Big Ten)
- Head coach: Muddy Waters (2nd season)
- Offensive coordinator: Joe Pendry (2nd season)
- MVP: Bryan Clark
- Captains: George Cooper; John Leister
- Home stadium: Spartan Stadium

1981 Big Ten Conference football standings
| | Conf. | | | | | Overall |
| Team | W | | L | | T | W | | L | | T |
|---|---|---|---|---|---|---|---|---|---|---|
| No. 15 Ohio State + | 6 | – | 2 | – | 0 | 9 | – | 3 | – | 0 |
| No. 18 Iowa + | 6 | – | 2 | – | 0 | 8 | – | 4 | – | 0 |
| No. 12 Michigan | 6 | – | 3 | – | 0 | 9 | – | 3 | – | 0 |
| Illinois | 6 | – | 3 | – | 0 | 7 | – | 4 | – | 0 |
| Wisconsin | 6 | – | 3 | – | 0 | 7 | – | 5 | – | 0 |
| Minnesota | 4 | – | 5 | – | 0 | 6 | – | 5 | – | 0 |
| Michigan State | 4 | – | 5 | – | 0 | 5 | – | 6 | – | 0 |
| Purdue | 3 | – | 6 | – | 0 | 5 | – | 6 | – | 0 |
| Indiana | 3 | – | 6 | – | 0 | 3 | – | 8 | – | 0 |
| Northwestern | 0 | – | 9 | – | 0 | 0 | – | 11 | – | 0 |
+ – Conference co-champions; Rankings from AP Poll

The 1981 Michigan State Spartans football team was an American football team that represented Michigan State University as a member of the Big Ten Conference during the 1981 Big Ten football season. In their second season under head coach Muddy Waters, the Spartans compiled a 5–6 record (4–5 in conference games), tied for sixth place in the Big Ten, and outscored opponents by a total of 263 to 249. In four games against ranked opponents, they lost to No. 8 Ohio State, No. 6 Michigan, and No. 19 Iowa, and defeated No. 14 Wisconsin.

Four Spartans were recognized by the Associated Press (AP) and/or the United Press International (UPI) as first-team players on the 1981 All-Big Ten Conference football team: center Tom Piette (AP-2; UPI-1); linebacker Carl Banks (AP-2; UPI-1); defensive back Jim Burroughs (AP-2; UPI-1); and placekicker Morten Andersen (AP-1; UPI-1). Several Michigan State players ranked among the Big Ten leaders, including the following:

- Placekicker Morten Andersen led the conference with 15 field goals made and a 75.0 field goal percentage.
- Quarterback Bryan Clark ranked third in the conference with a 128.9 passing efficiency rating, fourth with a 53.4% pass completion percentage and seventh with 1,521 passing yards. Clark was also selected as the team's most valuable player.
- Running back Aaron Roberts ranked seventh in the conference with 4.9 yards per carry and 10th with 461 rushing yards.
- Ted Jones ranked sixth in the conference with 44 receptions and ninth with 624 receiving yards.
- Daryl Turner ranked eighth in the conference with 653 receiving yards.

The team played its home games at Spartan Stadium in East Lansing, Michigan.

== Schedule ==
| Date | Opponent | Site | Result | Attendance | Source |
|---|---|---|---|---|---|
| September 12 | Illinois | Spartan Stadium; East Lansing, MI | L 17–27 | 54,945 | |
| September 19 | at No. 8 Ohio State | Ohio Stadium; Columbus, OH | L 13–27 | 87,084 | |
| September 26 | Bowling Green* | Spartan Stadium; East Lansing, MI | W 10–7 | 64,323 | |
| October 3 | at Notre Dame* | Notre Dame Stadium; Notre Dame, IN (rivalry) | L 7–20 | 59,074 | |
| October 10 | No. 6 Michigan | Spartan Stadium; East Lansing, MI (rivalry) | L 20–38 | 77,923 | |
| October 17 | No. 14 Wisconsin^{†} | Spartan Stadium; East Lansing, MI | W 33–14 | 67,652 | |
| October 24 | at Purdue | Ross–Ade Stadium; West Lafayette, IN | L 26–27 | 69,877 | |
| October 31 | Indiana | Spartan Stadium; East Lansing, MI (rivalry) | W 26–3 | 60,131 | |
| November 7 | at Northwestern | Dyche Stadium; Evanston, IL | W 61–14 | 24,104 | |
| November 14 | Minnesota | Spartan Stadium; East Lansing, MI | W 43–36 | 56,571 | |
| November 21 | at No. 19 Iowa | Kinnick Stadium; Iowa City, IA | L 7–36 | 60,103 | |
*Non-conference game; ^{†}Homecoming; Rankings from AP Poll released prior to the game

== Roster ==
1981 Michigan State Spartans football team roster
Players
Coaches
Offense

| Pos. | # | Name | Class |
|---|---|---|---|
| OT | 68 | Scott Auer | So |
| QB | 14 | Bryan Clark | Sr |
| RB | 5 | Tony Ellis | Jr |
| C | 51 | Joe Jacquemain | Sr |
| QB | 18 | John Leister | Jr |
| WR | 38 | Daryl Turner | So |
| OT | 72 | Jeff Wiska | Sr |

Defense

| Pos. | # | Name | Class |
|---|---|---|---|
| LB | 54 | Carl Banks | So |
| CB | 28 | Jim Burroughs | Sr |
| LB | 39 | George Cooper | Sr |
| DE | 91 | Smiley Creswell | Sr |
| DB | 35 | Tim Cunningham | So |
| DB | 48 | Nate Hannah | So |
| LB | 43 | Steve Maidlow | Sr |
| CB | 7 | Chris Van Pelt | Jr |

Special teams

| Pos. | # | Name | Class |
|---|---|---|---|
| K | 8 | Morten Andersen | Sr |
| P | 2 | Ralf Mojsiejenko | Fr |

Head coach

- Muddy Waters

Coordinators/assistant coaches

Legend

- (C) Team captain
- (S) Suspended
- (I) Ineligible
- Injured
- Redshirt
