= 1981 Wisconsin Badgers football team =

American college football season

1981 Wisconsin Badgers football

Garden State Bowl, L 21–28 vs. Tennessee
- Conference: Big Ten Conference
- Record: 7–5 (6–3 Big Ten)
- Head coach: Dave McClain (4th season)
- Offensive coordinator: Bill Dudley (2nd season)
- Offensive scheme: Triple option
- Defensive coordinator: Jim Hilles (4th season)
- Base defense: 3–4
- MVP: Dave Levenick
- Captains: Dave Levenick; Dave Mohapp; Larry Spurlin
- Home stadium: Camp Randall Stadium

1981 Big Ten Conference football standings
| | Conf. | | | | | Overall |
| Team | W | | L | | T | W | | L | | T |
|---|---|---|---|---|---|---|---|---|---|---|
| No. 15 Ohio State + | 6 | – | 2 | – | 0 | 9 | – | 3 | – | 0 |
| No. 18 Iowa + | 6 | – | 2 | – | 0 | 8 | – | 4 | – | 0 |
| No. 12 Michigan | 6 | – | 3 | – | 0 | 9 | – | 3 | – | 0 |
| Illinois | 6 | – | 3 | – | 0 | 7 | – | 4 | – | 0 |
| Wisconsin | 6 | – | 3 | – | 0 | 7 | – | 5 | – | 0 |
| Minnesota | 4 | – | 5 | – | 0 | 6 | – | 5 | – | 0 |
| Michigan State | 4 | – | 5 | – | 0 | 5 | – | 6 | – | 0 |
| Purdue | 3 | – | 6 | – | 0 | 5 | – | 6 | – | 0 |
| Indiana | 3 | – | 6 | – | 0 | 3 | – | 8 | – | 0 |
| Northwestern | 0 | – | 9 | – | 0 | 0 | – | 11 | – | 0 |
+ – Conference co-champions; Rankings from AP Poll

The 1981 Wisconsin Badgers football team represented the University of Wisconsin–Madison in the 1981 Big Ten Conference football season. Led by fourth-year head coach Dave McClain, the Badgers compiled an overall record of 7–5 with a mark of 6–3 in conference play, placing in a three-way tie for third in the Big Ten. Wisconsin was invited to the Garden State Bowl, where the Badgers lost to Tennessee. The team played home games at Camp Randall Stadium in Madison, Wisconsin.

Several Wisconsin players ranked among the Big Ten leaders, including the following:

- Quarterback Jess Cole ranked seventh in the conference with 12 passing touchdowns and ninth with 1,180 passing yards.
- Running back John Williams ranked second in the conference with 5.5 rushing yards per carry and seventh with 634 rushing yards.
- David Greenwood led the conference with 156 interception return yards, and he and Matt Vanden Boom tied for second in the conference with six interceptions each.

Wisconsin made its first bowl game appearance since the 1963 Rose Bowl.

== Schedule ==
| Date | Opponent | Rank | Site | Result | Attendance | Source |
|---|---|---|---|---|---|---|
| September 12 | No. 1 Michigan | | Camp Randall Stadium; Madison, WI | W 21–14 | 68,733 | |
| September 19 | No. 9 UCLA* | No. 20 | Camp Randall Stadium; Madison, WI | L 13–31 | 71,496 | |
| September 26 | Western Michigan*^{†} | | Camp Randall Stadium; Madison, WI | W 21–10 | 67,196 | |
| October 3 | Purdue | | Camp Randall Stadium; Madison, WI | W 20–14 | 68,603 | |
| October 10 | No. 18 Ohio State | | Camp Randall Stadium; Madison, WI | W 24–21 | 78,973 | |
| October 17 | at Michigan State | No. 14 | Spartan Stadium; East Lansing, MI | L 14–33 | 67,352 | |
| October 24 | at Illinois | | Memorial Stadium; Champaign, IL | L 21–23 | 67,413 | |
| October 31 | Northwestern | | Camp Randall Stadium; Madison, WI | W 52–0 | 70,035 | |
| November 7 | at Indiana | | Memorial Stadium; Bloomington, IN | W 28–7 | 44,218 | |
| November 14 | Iowa | | Camp Randall Stadium; Madison, WI (rivalry) | L 7–17 | 78,731 | |
| November 21 | at Minnesota | | Memorial Stadium; Minneapolis, MN (rivalry) | W 26–21 | 47,125 | |
| December 13 | vs. Tennessee* | | Giants Stadium; East Rutherford, NJ (Garden State Bowl) | L 21–28 | 53,220 | |
*Non-conference game; ^{†}Homecoming; Rankings from AP Poll released prior to the game

== Game summaries ==
=== Michigan ===
#1 Michigan at Wisconsin

| Team | 1 | 2 | 3 | 4 | Total |
|---|---|---|---|---|---|
| Michigan | 0 | 7 | 7 | 0 | 14 |
| • Wisconsin | 0 | 14 | 7 | 0 | 21 |

- Date: Saturday, September 12
- Location: Camp Randall Stadium, Madison, Wisconsin
- Game attendance: 68,733
- Source: Gainesville Sun

Scoring summary
| 2 | | Michigan | S. Smith 4 yard run (Haji-Sheikh kick) | Michigan 7-0 |
| 2 | | Wisconsin | Neal 17 yard pass from Cole (Doran kick) | Tie 7-7 |
| 2 | | Wisconsin | Davis 1 yard run (Doran kick) | Wisconsin 14-7 |
| 3 | | Michigan | Woolfolk 89 yard run (Haji-Sheikh kick) | Tie 14-14 |
| 3 | 5:13 | Wisconsin | Williams 71 yard pass from Cole (Doran kick) | Wisconsin 21-14 |

Wisconsin safety Matt Vanden Boom had three interceptions, including the game-clincher with two seconds left at his own 17. It was the Badgers first win against Michigan since 1962 and the first time they scored points against the Wolverines since 1976.

=== At Minnesota ===
Wisconsin Badgers (6–4) at Minnesota Golden Gophers (6–4)

| Quarter | 1 | 2 | Total |
|---|---|---|---|
| Wisconsin | | | 0 |
| Minnesota | | | 0 |

at Memorial Stadium, Minneapolis, Minnesota

- Date: November 21, 1981
- Game attendance: 47,125

Head coach Dave McClain inserted backup Randy Wright in the fourth quarter after Minnesota took the lead for the first time, on the reason "because Cole was not having a good day throwing." Following the victory, Wisconsin accepted the bid from the Garden State Bowl to play Tennessee.

| Team | Category | Player | Statistics |
|---|---|---|---|
| Wisconsin | Passing | Jess Cole | 6/17, 84 Yds |
| Wisconsin | Rushing | | |
| Wisconsin | Receiving | | |
| Minnesota | Passing | Mike Hohensee | 17/34, 254 Yds, TD |
| Minnesota | Rushing | | |
| Minnesota | Receiving | Chester Cooper | 6 Rec, 123 Yds, TD |

Scoring summary

| Quarter | Time | Drive | | | Team | Scoring information | Score | |
| Quarter | Time | Plays | Yards | TOP | Team | Scoring information | WISC | MINN |
|---|---|---|---|---|---|---|---|---|
| 4 | | | | | Minnesota | Chester Cooper 4-yard touchdown reception from Mike Hohensee, Jim Gallery kick good | 20 | 21 |
| 4 | 1:05 | | | | Wisconsin | Michael Jones 7-yard touchdown reception from Randy Wright, 2-point | 26 | 21 |
| "TOP" = time of possession. For other American football terms, see Glossary of American football. | | | | | | | 26 | 21 |

== Personnel ==
1981 Wisconsin Badgers football team roster
Players
Coaches
Offense

| Pos. | # | Name | Class |
|---|---|---|---|
| QB | 10 | Jess Cole | So |
| RB | 23 | Chucky Davis | So |
| OT | 70 | Jerry Doerger | Sr |
| FB | 41 | Gary Ellerson | Fr |
| TE | 37 | Craig Fredrick | Sr |
| FB | 36 | Gerald Green | Jr |
| FB | 8 | Paul Hughes | Sr |
| WR | 82 | Michael Jones | Fr |
| G | 71 | Leo Joyce | Sr |
| RB | 35 | Troy King | Jr |
| WR | 20 | Thad McFadden | So |
| WR | 38 | Kyle McKinnon | Sr |
| FB | 28 | Dave Mohapp (C) | Sr |
| TE | 88 | Jeff Nault | Jr |
| WR | 22 | Marvin Neal | Jr |
| TE | 86 | Bret Pearson | So |
| TE | 84 | Greg Rabas | Sr |
| RB | 33 | Curtis Richardson | Sr |
| WR | 34 | Al Seamonson | Sr |
| G | 52 | Pete Severson | Jr |
| WR | 42 | Tim Stracka (injured) | Sr |
| G | 53 | Mark Subach | Jr |
| OT | 66 | Scott Swan | Sr |
| G | 73 | Melvin Terrell (injured) | So |
| WR | 87 | Al Toon | Fr |
| C | 58 | Ron Versnik | Jr |
| OT | 74 | Carlton Walker | So |
| RB | 1 | John Williams | Jr |
| OT | 79 | Bob Winckler | Jr |
| QB | 12 | Randy Wright | So |

Defense

| Pos. | # | Name | Class |
|---|---|---|---|
| CB | 26 | Brett Armstrong | Jr |
| LB | 95 | Guy Boliaux | Sr |
| LB | 32 | Kyle Borland | Jr |
| DT | 72 | Jeff Dellenbach | Fr |
| S/P | 31 | David Greenwood | Jr |
| NT | 93 | Jack Grundy | Jr |
| NT | 50 | Tim Krumrie | Jr |
| LB | 47 | Dave Levenick (C) | Sr |
| LB | 94 | Jeff Luko | Jr |
| CB | 45 | Von Mansfield | Sr |
| CB | 15 | Brian Marrow | So |
| LB | 33 | James Melka | Fr |
| S | 11 | Dan Messenger | Jr |
| LB | 44 | Jody O'Donnell | Jr |
| DT | 71 | Chris Osswald | So |
| DT | 76 | Mark Shumate | Jr |
| CB | 9 | Clint Sims | Jr |
| DT | 60 | Darryl Simms | So |
| LB | 49 | Larry Spurlin (C) | Sr |
| S | 2 | Ron Steverson | Sr |
| S | 27 | Vaughn Thomas | Jr |
| CB | 5 | Jerry Vance | So |
| S | 39 | Matt Vanden Boom | Jr |
| S | 7 | John Westphal | Sr |

Special teams

| Pos. | # | Name | Class |
|---|---|---|---|
| S, P | 31 | David Greenwood | Jr |
| K | 24 | Mark Doran | So |
| K | 6 | Wendell Gladem | So |

Head coach

- Dave McClain

Coordinators/assistant coaches

- Bill Dudley – Offensive Coordinator/Quarterbacks and Receivers
- Jim Hilles – Defensive Coordinator/Linebackers
- Doug Graber – Defensive Backs
- Arnold Jeter – Defensive Line
- Cliff Knox – Running Backs
- Mike Nelson – Defensive Ends
- Bob Palcic – Tackles and Tight Ends
- Mario Russo – Centers and Guards
- Jerry Fishbain – Recruiting Coordinator

Legend

- (C) Team captain
- (S) Suspended
- (I) Ineligible
- Injured
- Redshirt

== 1982 NFL draft ==
| Player | Position | Round | Pick | NFL club |
|---|---|---|---|---|
| Von Mansfield | Cornerback | 5 | 122 | Atlanta Falcons |
| Jerry Doerger | Tackle | 8 | 200 | Chicago Bears |
| Guy Boliaux | Linebacker | 11 | 283 | Chicago Bears |
| Dave Levenick | Linebacker | 12 | 315 | Atlanta Falcons |
