= 1981 Indiana Hoosiers football team =

American college football season

1981 Indiana Hoosiers football
- Conference: Big Ten Conference
- Record: 3–8 (3–6 Big Ten)
- Head coach: Lee Corso (9th season)
- Defensive coordinator: Ron Corradini (1st season)
- MVP: Bob Stephenson
- Captains: Bob Stephenson; Craig Walls
- Home stadium: Memorial Stadium

1981 Big Ten Conference football standings
	Conf.					Overall
Team	W		L		T	W		L		T
No. 15 Ohio State +	6	–	2	–	0	9	–	3	–	0
No. 18 Iowa +	6	–	2	–	0	8	–	4	–	0
No. 12 Michigan	6	–	3	–	0	9	–	3	–	0
Illinois	6	–	3	–	0	7	–	4	–	0
Wisconsin	6	–	3	–	0	7	–	5	–	0
Minnesota	4	–	5	–	0	6	–	5	–	0
Michigan State	4	–	5	–	0	5	–	6	–	0
Purdue	3	–	6	–	0	5	–	6	–	0
Indiana	3	–	6	–	0	3	–	8	–	0
Northwestern	0	–	9	–	0	0	–	11	–	0
+ – Conference co-champions; Rankings from AP Poll

The 1981 Indiana Hoosiers football team represented the Indiana Hoosiers in the 1981 Big Ten Conference football season. They participated as members of the Big Ten Conference. The Hoosiers played their home games at Memorial Stadium in Bloomington, Indiana. The team was coached by Lee Corso, in his ninth year as head coach of the Hoosiers.

Several Indiana players ranked among the Big Ten leaders, including the following:

- Quarterback Babe Laufenberg ranked third in the conference with a 57.1% pass completion percentage, fifth with 1,788 passing yards, and sixth with a 118.5 passing efficiency rating.
- Wide receiver Duane Gunn led the conference with an average of 21.2 yards per reception and 27.3 yards per kickoff return and sixth with 656 receiving yards.
- Marc Longshore ranked fifth in the conference with four interceptions.

== Schedule ==
Date	Opponent	Site	TV	Result	Attendance	Source
September 12	at Northwestern	Dyche Stadium; Evanston, IL		W 21–20	22,856	
September 19	No. 2 USC*	Memorial Stadium; Bloomington, IN	ONTV	L 21–0	51,167	
September 26	at Syracuse*	Carrier Dome; Syracuse, NY		L 7–21	32,060	
October 3	No. 8 Michigan	Memorial Stadium; Bloomington, IN		L 17–38	50,612	
October 10	at No. 15 Iowa	Kinnick Stadium; Iowa City, IA		L 28–42	60,000	
October 17	Minnesota^{†}	Memorial Stadium; Bloomington, IN		W 17–16	46,460	
October 24	at Ohio State	Ohio Stadium; Columbus, OH		L 10–29	87,182	
October 31	at Michigan State	Spartan Stadium; East Lansing, MI (rivalry)		L 3–26	60,131	
November 7	Wisconsin	Memorial Stadium; Bloomington, IN		L 7–28	44,218	
November 14	at Illinois	Memorial Stadium; Champaign, IL (rivalry)		L 14–35	56,143	
November 21	Purdue	Memorial Stadium; Bloomington, IN (Old Oaken Bucket)		W 20–17	48,466	
*Non-conference game; ^{†}Homecoming; Rankings from AP Poll released prior to the game

== Game summaries ==
=== Purdue ===
Doug Smith kicked the go-ahead 39-yard field goal with 8:30 left in the game and Indiana's defense stopped two ensuing Purdue drives with interceptions to preserve the victory.

== Roster ==
- WR Duane Gunn
- QB Babe Laufenberg, Jr.
