= 1982 All-Big Ten Conference football team =

American college football all-star team

The 1982 All-Big Ten Conference football team consists of American football players chosen by various organizations for All-Big Ten Conference teams for the 1982 college football season.

Michigan receiver Anthony Carter was a first-team pick for the third consecutive year, a unanimous first-team selection by the conference coaches, and also a consensus All-American. Eight Michigan players were selected as a first-team players, including Carter, running back Lawrence Ricks, offensive guard Stefan Humphries, defensive back Keith Bostic. Ohio State and Wisconsin followed with five first-team players each.

== Offensive selections ==
=== Quarterbacks ===
- Tony Eason, Illinois (AP-1; UPI-1)
- Steve Smith, Michigan (AP-2)
- Babe Laufenberg, Indiana (UPI-2)

=== Running backs ===
- Lawrence Ricks, Michigan (AP-1; UPI-1)
- Tim Spencer, Ohio State (AP-1; UPI-1)
- Mel Gray, Purdue (AP-2; UPI-2)
- Eddie Phillips, Iowa (AP-2)
- Ricky Edwards, Northwestern (UPI-2)

=== Wide receivers ===
- Anthony Carter, Michigan (AP-1; UPI-1)
- Mike Martin, Illinois (AP-1; UPI-2)
- Duane Gunn, Indiana (AP-2; UPI-1)
- Gary Williams, Ohio State (AP-2; UPI-2)

=== Tight ends ===
- Cliff Benson, Purdue (AP-1)
- John Frank, Ohio State (UPI-1)
- Jon Harvey, Northwestern (AP-2; UPI-2)

=== Centers ===
- Tom Dixon, Michigan (AP-1; UPI-1)
- Joel Hilgenberg, Iowa (AP-2; UPI-2)

=== Guards ===
- Stefan Humphries, Michigan (AP-1; UPI-1)
- Joe Lukens, Ohio State (AP-1; UPI-1)
- Bill Humphries, Minnesota (AP-2; UPI-2)
- Jim Sakanich, Indiana (AP-2)
- Randy Rasmussen, Minnesota (UPI-2)

=== Tackles ===
- Chris Hinton, Northwestern (AP-1; UPI-1)
- Rich Strenger, Michigan (AP-1)
- Bob Winckler, Wisconsin (AP-2; UPI-1)
- John Alt, Iowa (AP-2)
- Brett Miller, Iowa (UPI-2)
- William Roberts, Ohio State (UPI-2)

== Defensive selections ==
=== Defensive linemen ===
- Mark Bortz, Iowa (AP-1; UPI-1)
- Jerome Foster, Ohio State (AP-1; UPI-1)
- Tim Krumrie, Wisconsin (AP-1; UPI-1)
- Darryl Sims, Wisconsin (AP-1; UPI-1)
- Smiley Creswell, Michigan State (AP-2; UPI-2)
- Matt Hernandez, Purdue (AP-2; UPI-2)
- Karl Mecklenburg, Minnesota (AP-2; UPI-2)
- Dan Gregus, Illinois (AP-2)
- Winfred Carraway, Michigan (UPI-2)

=== Linebackers ===
- Carl Banks, Michigan State (AP-1; UPI-1)
- Paul Girgash, Michigan (AP-1; UPI-1)
- Marcus Marek, Ohio State (AP-1; UPI-1)
- Robert Thompson, Michigan (AP-1; UPI-1)
- Mike Boren, Michigan (AP-2; UPI-2)
- Mark Brown, Purdue (AP-2; UPI-2)
- Glen Cobb, Ohio State (AP-2; UPI-2)
- Larry Station, Iowa (AP-2)
- David Frye, Purdue (UPI-2)

=== Defensive backs ===
- Keith Bostic, Michigan (AP-1; UPI-1)
- David Greenwood, Wisconsin (AP-1; UPI-1)
- Bob Stoops, Iowa (AP-1)
- Matt Vanden Boom, Wisconsin (AP-2; UPI-1)
- Charles Armstead, Illinois (AP-2; UPI-2)
- Craig Swoope, Illinois (AP-2; UPI-2)
- Shaun Gayle, Ohio State (UPI-2)

== Special teams ==
=== Placekicker ===
- Mike Bass, Illinois (AP-1; UPI-1)
- Ali Haji-Sheikh, Michigan (AP-2; UPI-2)

=== Punter ===
- Reggie Roby, Iowa (AP-1; UPI-1)
- John Kidd, Purdue (AP-2; UPI-2)

== Key ==
Bold = Selected as a first-team player by both the media (AP) and coaches (UPI)

AP = Associated Press, "selected by a panel of sports writers and broadcasters throughout the Midwest"

UPI = United Press International, selected by the Big Ten Conference coaches

== See also ==
- 1982 College Football All-America Team
