= 1981 Astro-Bluebonnet Bowl =

UCLA Bruins	Michigan Wolverines
(7–3–1)	(8–3)
14	33
Head coach: Terry Donahue	Head coach: Bo Schembechler
AP / Coaches; 19 / 16	AP / Coaches; 16 / 13
	1	2	3	4	Total
UCLA	0	0	7	7	14
Michigan	10	0	3	20	33
- Date: December 31, 1981
- Season: 1981
- Stadium: Houston Astrodome
- Location: Houston, Texas
- MVP: Butch Woolfolk
- National anthem: Michigan Marching Band
- Referee: Dixon Holman (SWC)
- Halftime show: UCLA Band and Michigan Marching Band
- Attendance: 50,107

United States TV coverage
- Network: Mizlou Television Network
- Announcers: Ray Scott and Lee Corso

The 1981 Astro-Bluebonnet Bowl was a college football bowl game, played on December 31, 1981. It was the 23rd Bluebonnet Bowl game. The Michigan Wolverines defeated the UCLA Bruins by a score of 33–14. This was the first bowl game meeting of a Big Ten team and a Pac-10 team outside the Rose Bowl Game and was labeled the "mini Rose Bowl". Both teams were in the running to meet in the 1982 Rose Bowl, but had their seasons spoiled on November 21, 1981, by their arch-rivals.

== Teams ==
=== Michigan ===
The defending 1981 Rose Bowl champion Wolverines, who were the preseason #1, opened with a loss to Wisconsin. This led to the Badgers being ranked afterwards. Also, losing the #1 ranking led to the Clemson Tigers winning their first consensus national championship. The Wolverines responded the next week by beating Notre Dame 25-7. Wins over Navy and Indiana led to a cross state showdown at Michigan State, where the Wolverines downed the Spartans 38–20. The next week, Michigan hosted Iowa and lost 9–7. Michigan would win the next four games leading up to the Michigan–Ohio State rivalry football game on November 21. Michigan lost to Ohio State 14–9. Ohio State and Iowa were tied for the Big Ten conference championship. Iowa would go on to the 1982 Rose Bowl, as Iowa and Ohio State did not play each other, and Ohio State had been to the 1980 Rose Bowl.

=== UCLA ===
The Bruins opened the season with wins at Arizona and at #20 Wisconsin. They lost at Iowa, the eventual Big Ten champion 20–9. Even with a 26–23 loss at Stanford and a tie at Washington State, the Bruins were in position to win the Pacific-10 after four straight wins. Going into the UCLA–USC rivalry football game, The Rose Bowl was on the line for the third time for Terry Donahue's UCLA Bruins teams against USC. UCLA lost to USC in a 21–20 nailbiter, which put Washington into the 1982 Rose Bowl. Washington had defeated USC just the week before in what would prove to be the other conference deciding game.

== Game summary ==
=== Scoring ===
==== First quarter ====
- Michigan — Ali Haji-Sheikh, 24-yard field goal.
- Michigan — Anthony Carter, 50-yard pass from Steve Smith. Haji-Sheikh converts.

==== Second quarter ====
no scoring

==== Third quarter ====
- UCLA — Jojo Townsell, 17-yard pass from Tom Ramsey. Norm Johnson converts.
- Michigan —Haji-Sheikh, 47-yard field goal.

==== Fourth quarter ====
- Michigan — Butch Woolfolk, one-yard run. Run failed.
- UCLA—Tim Wrightman, nine-yard pass from Ramsey. Johnson converts.
- Michigan—Smith, nine-yard run. Haji-Sheikh converts.
- Michigan—B.J. Dickey, five-yard run. Haji-Sheikh converts.

=== Aftermath ===
The Bluebonnet Bowl was the first of three meetings between the schools in 367 days. They met during the 1982 NCAA Division I-A football season twice: at Michigan Stadium, where UCLA won 31–27, and in the 1983 Rose Bowl, where UCLA earned a 24–14 victory.
