= 1981 Minnesota Golden Gophers football team =

American college football season

1981 Minnesota Golden Gophers football
- Conference: Big Ten Conference
- Record: 6–5 (4–5 Big Ten)
- Head coach: Joe Salem (3rd season)
- MVP: Mike Hohensee
- Captain: Ken Dallafior
- Home stadium: Memorial Stadium

1981 Big Ten Conference football standings
	Conf.					Overall
Team	W		L		T	W		L		T
No. 15 Ohio State +	6	–	2	–	0	9	–	3	–	0
No. 18 Iowa +	6	–	2	–	0	8	–	4	–	0
No. 12 Michigan	6	–	3	–	0	9	–	3	–	0
Illinois	6	–	3	–	0	7	–	4	–	0
Wisconsin	6	–	3	–	0	7	–	5	–	0
Minnesota	4	–	5	–	0	6	–	5	–	0
Michigan State	4	–	5	–	0	5	–	6	–	0
Purdue	3	–	6	–	0	5	–	6	–	0
Indiana	3	–	6	–	0	3	–	8	–	0
Northwestern	0	–	9	–	0	0	–	11	–	0
+ – Conference co-champions; Rankings from AP Poll

The 1981 Minnesota Golden Gophers football team represented the University of Minnesota in the 1981 Big Ten Conference football season. In their third year under head coach Joe Salem, the Golden Gophers compiled a 6–5 record and outscored their opponents by a combined total of 274 to 264. It was the final season in Memorial Stadium.

Quarterback Mike Hohensee received the team's Most Valuable Player award, while flanker Chester Cooper was named offensive MVP, and linebacker Jim Fahnhorst was named the defensive MVP. Fahnhorst and offensive tackle Ken Dallafior were named All-Big Ten first team. Cooper, offensive lineman Bill Humphries, defensive end Karl Mecklenburg, and defensive lineman Fred Orgas were named All-Big Ten second team. Defensive lineman Brent Harms and Fred Orgas, free safety Mike Robb, and safety Rick Witthus were named Academic All-Big Ten.

Several Minnesota players ranked among the Big Ten leaders, including the following:

- Mike Hohensee led the conference with 20 passing touchdowns and ranked fourth with 2,412 passing yards.
- Wide receiver Chester Cooper led the conference with 1,012 receiving yards and ranked second with 58 receptions.
- Running back Frank Jacobs ranked sixth in the conference with 638 rushing yards and fifth with eight rushing touchdowns.
- Placekicker Jim Gallery ranked second in the conference with 13 field goals made, fourth with a 59.8 field goal percentage, and seventh with 62 points scored.

Total attendance for the season was 301,248, which averaged to 43,035. The season high for attendance was against Michigan.

== Schedule ==
Date	Time	Opponent	Site	TV	Result	Attendance	Source
September 12		Ohio*	Memorial Stadium; Minneapolis, MN		W 19–17	40,086	
September 19		Purdue	Memorial Stadium; Minneapolis, MN	WLFI-TV	W 16–13	41,530	
September 26		Oregon State*	Memorial Stadium; Minneapolis, MN		W 42–12	30,890	
October 3		at Illinois	Memorial Stadium; Champaign, IL		L 29–38	63,814	
October 10		Northwestern^{†}	Memorial Stadium; Minneapolis, MN		W 35–23	45,949	
October 17		at Indiana	Memorial Stadium; Bloomington, IN		L 16–17	46,460	
October 24		at No. 6 Iowa	Kinnick Stadium; Iowa City, IA (rivalry)		W 12–10	60,000	
October 31		No. 15 Michigan	Memorial Stadium; Minneapolis, MN (Little Brown Jug)	ON-TV	L 13–34	52,875	
November 7	1:00 pm	No. 18 Ohio State	Memorial Stadium; Minneapolis, MN	ESPN	W 35–31	42,793	
November 14		at Michigan State	Spartan Stadium; East Lansing, MI		L 36–43	56,571	
November 21		Wisconsin	Memorial Stadium; Minneapolis, MN (rivalry)		L 21–26	47,125	
*Non-conference game; ^{†}Homecoming; Rankings from AP Poll released prior to the game

== Game summaries ==
=== Oregon State ===
Team	1	2	3	4	Total
Oregon St	3	0	2	7	12
• Minnesota	6	20	9	7	42

- Date: September 26
- Location: Memorial Stadium • Minneapolis, Minnesota

Scoring summary
1	MINN	Carroll 1 yard pass from Hohensee (kick failed)	Minnesota 6-0
1	ORST	Mangold 52 yard field goal	Minnesota 6-3
2	MINN	Curtis 8 yard pass from Hohensee (Gallery kick)	Minnesota 13-3
2	MINN	Curtis 14 yard pass from Hohensee (Gallery kick)	Minnesota 20-3
2	MINN	Cooper 38 yard pass from Hohensee (kick failed)	Minnesota 26-3
3	MINN	Gallery 28 yard field goal	Minnesota 29-3
3	ORST	Safety, ball snapped out of end zone	Minnesota 29-5
3	MINN	Weckbecker 27 yard pass from Hohensee (kick failed)	Minnesota 35-5
4	MINN	Henry 1 yard run (Gallery kick)	Minnesota 42-5
4	ORST	Terrell 6 yard run (Mangold kick)	Minnesota 42-12

=== Ohio State ===
Ohio State Buckeyes at Minnesota Golden Gophers

Quarter	1	2	3	4	Total
Ohio St	14	7	7	3	31
Minnesota	0	7	14	14	35

at Memorial Stadium, Minneapolis, Minnesota

- Date: November 7
- Game time: 1:00 p.m.
- Game weather: Clear, 64 °F (18 °C)
- Game attendance: 42,793
- Referee: Glenn Fortin
- Box Score

Game information

First quarter

- OSU – John Frank 7-yard pass from Art Schlichter (Bob Atha kick), 5:33. Ohio St 7–0. Drive: 8 plays, 76 yards.
- OSU – Tim Spencer 73-yard run (Bob Atha kick), 0:00. Ohio St 14–0. Drive: 2 plays, 80 yards, 0:10.

Second quarter

- MINN – Todd Hallstrom 1-yard pass from Mike Hohensee (Jim Gallery kick), 9:53. Ohio St 14–7. Drive: 11 plays, 80 yards, 5:07.
- OSU – Tim Spencer 2-yard run (Bob Atha kick), 7:39. Ohio St 21–7. Drive: 6 plays, 74 yards, 2:14.

Third quarter

- MINN – Jay Carroll 27-yard pass from Mike Hohensee (Jim Gallery kick), 11:25. Ohio St 21–14. Drive: 12 plays, 64 yards, 2:35.
- MINN – Frank Jacobs 17-yard pass from Mike Hohensee (Jim Gallery kick), 8:34. Tie 21–21. Drive: 4 plays, 36 yards, 1:20.
- OSU – Art Schlichter 1-yard run (Bob Atha kick), 0:30. Ohio St 28–21. Drive: 9 plays, 57 yards, 3:39.

Fourth quarter

- OSU – Bob Atha 31-yard field goal, 8:18. Ohio St 31–21. Drive: 4 plays, 27 yards, 1:13.
- MINN – Jay Carroll 18-yard pass from Mike Hohensee (Jim Gallery kick), 6:56. Ohio St 31–28. Drive: 5 plays, 68 yards, 1:23.
- MINN – Jay Carroll 28-yard pass from Mike Hohensee (Jim Gallery kick), 2:38. Minnesota 35–31. Drive: 5 plays, 40 yards, 1:03

Top passers

- OSU – Art Schlichter – 13/33, 169 yards, TD, INT
- MINN – Mike Hohensee – 37/67, 444 yards, 5 TD, INT

Top rushers

- OSU – Tim Spencer – 16 rushes, 135 yards, 2 TD
- MINN – Tony Hunter – 6 rushes, 19 yards

Top receivers

- OSU – Gary Williams – 4 receptions, 72 yards
- MINN – Chester Cooper – 12 receptions, 182 yards

=== Wisconsin ===
Wisconsin Badgers (6–4) at Minnesota Golden Gophers (6–4)

Quarter	1	2	Total
Wisconsin			0
Minnesota			0

at Memorial Stadium, Minneapolis, Minnesota

- Date: November 21, 1981
- Game attendance: 47,125

The loss overshadowed a record-setting day for Mike Hohensee and Chester Cooper. Hohensee set the single season school records for completions and passing yardage while Chester Cooper broke the single season school record for receiving yardage.

Team	Category	Player	Statistics
Wisconsin	Passing	Jess Cole	6/17, 84 Yds
Wisconsin	Rushing		
Wisconsin	Receiving		
Minnesota	Passing	Mike Hohensee	17/34, 254 Yds, TD
Minnesota	Rushing		
Minnesota	Receiving	Chester Cooper	6 Rec, 123 Yds, TD

Scoring summary

Quarter	Time	Drive			Team	Scoring information	Score	
Quarter	Time	Plays	Yards	TOP	Team	Scoring information	WISC	MINN
4					Minnesota	Chester Cooper 4-yard touchdown reception from Mike Hohensee, Jim Gallery kick good	20	21
4	1:05				Wisconsin	Michael Jones 7-yard touchdown reception from Randy Wright, 2-point	26	21
"TOP" = time of possession. For other American football terms, see Glossary of American football.							26	21

== Personnel ==
1981 Minnesota Golden Gophers football team roster
Players
Coaches
Offense

Pos.	#	Name	Class
TE	83	Jay Carroll	So
WR	43	Chester Cooper	Sr
OT	78	Ken Dallafior	Sr
OL		Todd Hallstrom
QB	9	Mike Hohensee	Jr
RB		Tony Hunter
RB	40	Frank Jacobs
C	53	Randy Rasmussen	Jr
QB	10	Tim Salem	So
WR	19	Ron Weckbacher	Sr

Defense

Pos.	#	Name	Class
DT	71	Kurt Bankson	Sr
DT	74	Karl Mecklenburg	Jr

Special teams

Pos.	#	Name	Class
K	21	Jim Gallery	So

Head coach

- Joe Salem

Coordinators/assistant coaches

Legend

- (C) Team captain
- (S) Suspended
- (I) Ineligible
- Injured
- Redshirt

Roster
