= Dave Levenick =

American football player (born 1959)

No. 55
- Position: Linebacker

Personal information
- Born: May 28, 1959 (age 67); Milwaukee, Wisconsin, U.S.
- Listed height: 6 ft 3 in (1.91 m)
- Listed weight: 222 lb (101 kg)

Career information
- High school: Grafton (Grafton, Wisconsin)
- College: Wisconsin
- NFL draft: 1982: 12th round, 315th overall pick

Career history
- Atlanta Falcons (1982–1984)

Awards and highlights
- Second-team All-Big Ten (1981)
- Stats at Pro Football Reference

David John Levenick (born May 28, 1959) is an American former professional football player who was a linebacker in the National Football League (NFL). He played college football for the Wisconsin Badgers. He was selected by the Atlanta Falcons in the 12th round of the 1982 NFL draft.

== Early life ==
Levenick attended Grafton High School in Grafton, Wisconsin. For his senior season, he was named to the United Press International (UPI) All-state team. That off season, he appeared in the inaugural Wisconsin High School Shrine game, recording 12 tackles.

As a freshman, at the University of Wisconsin, Leveneck was part of what head coach John Jardine called a "tremendous" recruiting class. In 1978, he appeared in 11 games, and started two in relief of injured starter Dave Crossen. In 1979, he was named a starter, replacing Crossen. In November 1981, the Wisconsin players voted him team MVP for the season. As a senior, he tied Tim Krumrie with 114 total tackles. For the season, Levenick was named Second-team All-Conference.

== Professional career ==
Levenick was selected in the 12th round (315th overall) of the 1982 NFL draft by the Atlanta Falcons. In early May 1982, he signed his rookie contract.

On August 28, 1984, he was waived by the Falcons. On September 4, 1984, was placed on injured reserve.
