= 1981 Northwestern Wildcats football team =

American college football season

1981 Northwestern Wildcats football
- Conference: Big Ten Conference
- Record: 0–11 (0–9 Big Ten)
- Head coach: Dennis Green (1st season)
- Captains: Bobby Anderson; Mike Kerrigan
- Home stadium: Dyche Stadium

1981 Big Ten Conference football standings
	Conf.					Overall
Team	W		L		T	W		L		T
No. 15 Ohio State +	6	–	2	–	0	9	–	3	–	0
No. 18 Iowa +	6	–	2	–	0	8	–	4	–	0
No. 12 Michigan	6	–	3	–	0	9	–	3	–	0
Illinois	6	–	3	–	0	7	–	4	–	0
Wisconsin	6	–	3	–	0	7	–	5	–	0
Minnesota	4	–	5	–	0	6	–	5	–	0
Michigan State	4	–	5	–	0	5	–	6	–	0
Purdue	3	–	6	–	0	5	–	6	–	0
Indiana	3	–	6	–	0	3	–	8	–	0
Northwestern	0	–	9	–	0	0	–	11	–	0
+ – Conference co-champions; Rankings from AP Poll

The 1981 Northwestern Wildcats team represented Northwestern University during the 1981 Big Ten Conference football season. In their first year under head coach Dennis Green, the Wildcats compiled a 0–11 record (0–9 against Big Ten Conference opponents) and finished in last place in the Big Ten Conference. The team played its home games at Dyche Stadium in Evanston, Illinois.

Northwestern finished the season in the midst of a 34-game losing streak, the longest in NCAA Division I-A history. The streak began on September 22, 1979, and ended on September 25, 1982.

The team's offensive leaders were quarterback Mike Kerrigan with 1,317 passing yards, Jim Browne with 162 rushing yards, and Chris Hinton with 265 receiving yards. Ricky Edwards led the Big Ten with 30 kickoff returns and 611 kickoff return yards.

== Schedule ==
Date	Opponent	Site	Result	Attendance	Source
September 12	Indiana	Dyche Stadium; Evanston, IL	L 20–21	22,856	
September 19	at Arkansas*	War Memorial Stadium; Little Rock, AR	L 7–38	54,532	
September 26	Utah*	Dyche Stadium; Evanston, IL	L 0–42	25,256	
October 3	No. 18 Iowa	Dyche Stadium; Evanston, IL	L 0–64	30,113	
October 10	at Minnesota	Memorial Stadium; Minneapolis, MN	L 23–35	45,949	
October 17	Purdue	Dyche Stadium; Evanston, IL	L 0–35	20,777	
October 24	at No. 18 Michigan	Michigan Stadium; Ann Arbor, MI (rivalry)	L 0–38	104,361	
October 31	at Wisconsin	Camp Randall Stadium; Madison, WI	L 0–52	70,035	
November 7	Michigan State	Dyche Stadium; Evanston, IL	L 14–61	24,104	
November 14	at Ohio State	Ohio Stadium; Columbus, OH	L 6–70	86,912	
November 21	Illinois	Dyche Stadium; Evanston, IL (rivalry)	L 12–49	23,116	
*Non-conference game; Rankings from AP Poll released prior to the game

== Roster ==
1981 Northwestern Wildcats football team roster
Players
Coaches
Offense

Pos.	#	Name	Class
WR	84	Dave Bahoric	Sr
FB	44	David Callway	Jr
G	67	Jim Crowder	Sr
RB	30	Jeff Cohn	Jr
TE	93	John Finn	Sr
TE	80	Chris Hinton	Jr
QB	12	Mike Kerrigan (C)	Sr
OT	75	Rob Taylor	Sr

Defense

Pos.	#	Name	Class
FS	15	Bobby Anderson	Jr
LB	11	Chris Capstran	Sr
LB	35	Mike Guendling	So
LB	65	Alex Moyer	Fr
LB	68	Chris Natzke	Fr

Special teams

Pos.	#	Name	Class
K	90	Jay Anderson	Jr
P	4	John Kidd	So

Head coach

- Dennis Green

Coordinators/assistant coaches

Legend

- (C) Team captain
- (S) Suspended
- (I) Ineligible
- Injured
- Redshirt
