= Rich Strenger =

American football player (born 1960)

No. 71
- Position: Offensive tackle

Personal information
- Born: March 10, 1960 (age 66); Port Washington, Wisconsin, U.S.
- Listed height: 6 ft 7 in (2.01 m)
- Listed weight: 280 lb (127 kg)

Career information
- High school: Grafton (WI)
- College: Michigan
- NFL draft: 1983: 2nd round, 40th overall pick

Career history
- Detroit Lions (1983–1987); Buffalo Bills (1988–1989)

Awards and highlights
- First-team All-Big Ten (1982); Selected to East Squad, East-West Shrine Game (1982)

Career NFL statistics
- Games played: 49
- Games started: 30
- Stats at Pro Football Reference

Richard Gene Strenger (born March 10, 1960) is an American former professional football player who was an offensive tackle for the Detroit Lions of the National Football League (NFL) from 1983 to 1987. He was an All-Big Ten selection playing college football for the Michigan Wolverines (1980–1982). After his football career, he became a lawyer in Lake Orion, Michigan.

== Early life and college ==
Strenger began in football as a speedy, 218-pound end for Grafton High School in Grafton, Wisconsin. In 1977, he was named All-Metro at the end position after catching four touchdown passes, including a 41-yard reception. At Michigan, Strenger grew into a 6'7, 285 pound lineman and became an intimidating presence in the Michigan offensive line from 1980–1982. In 1981, he was a backup to Ed Muransky and Bubba Paris, and in 1982, he started all 12 games for the Big Ten champion Wolverines. In 1982, Strenger's blocking led the ways for tailback Lawrence Ricks to rush for 1,428 yards. He was named All-Big Ten at offensive tackle and honorable mention All-America in 1982. In the 1983 Rose Bowl game, Strenger injured his ankle on the third play of the game and did not return to the lineup as the Wolverines lost to UCLA, 21-14. Strenger was also selected to play for the East Squad in the 58th East-West Shrine Game on January 15, 1983 at Stanford Stadium.

== Professional football ==
Strenger was the Detroit Lions' second-round draft pick (40th selection overall) in the 1983 NFL Draft. He played in 49 NFL games, including all 16 games for the Lions in 1983. He had earned the starting tackle job in 1984, but he sustained torn ligaments in his right knee in the seventh play of the season opener against the San Francisco 49ers on September 2, 1984, and underwent surgery. Lions coach Monte Clark said of the loss of Strenger, "That's a disaster." He underwent surgery and missed the entire 1984 season and much of the 1985 season while recuperating. On returning to football after his injury, Strenger said, "Sometimes I feel like a rookie out there. In some ways, it's a new challenge to earn my position back, but I'm really anxious to get out there and do some hitting." Starting midway through the 1985 season, Strenger started 22 consecutive games and was considered Detroit’s comeback player of the year in 1986. He started all 16 games and played every offensive snap in 1986 on an offensive line that included Keith Dorney and Lomas Brown. Strenger was a leader on the Lions' offensive line, opening holes for Billy Sims (1,040 yards rushing in 1983) and James Jones (903 yards rushing in 1986). Comparing the college and pro training regimens, Strenger once noted that Bo Schembechler ran a more strenuous training camp than the Lions: "Things were tougher at Michigan, but they could afford to be because camp was only four weeks long. This is six weeks long, so there is more attention given to not tiring people out." The injuries caught up with Strenger as he was placed on injured reserve by the Lions in November 1987 and did not play in the NFL again. Strenger signed with the Buffalo Bills in May 1988 but did not make the team. After trying to make the Bills team in 1988 and 1989, Strenger was waived by the Bills on August 30, 1989. In September 2006, Strenger was honored by the Lions as the Alumni Honorary Captain for the Lions-Green Bay Packers game at Ford Field.

== Legal career ==
Strenger later received his Juris Doctor degree from the Detroit College of Law of Michigan State University in 1999, and worked with the law firm of Butzel Long in Bloomfield Hills, Michigan, before opening the Law Offices of Rich Strenger in Lake Orion, Michigan. He was named Volunteer of the Quarter for the first quarter of 2003 by the board of directors and staff of Community Legal Resources in Detroit. In December 2007, Strenger was hired by the North Oakland Transportation Authority to respond to allegations that the agency's director, Pat Fitchena, had engaged in misconduct and abuse of staff members.
