= 1981 Illinois Fighting Illini football team =

American college football season

1981 Illinois Fighting Illini football
- Conference: Big Ten Conference
- Record: 7–4 (6–3 Big Ten)
- Head coach: Mike White (2nd season)
- MVPs: Tony Eason; Kelvin Atkins; Ron Ferrari; Dan Gregus Mike Bass
- Captains: Greg Boeke; Ron Ferrari; Jack Squirek
- Home stadium: Memorial Stadium

1981 Big Ten Conference football standings
	Conf.					Overall
Team	W		L		T	W		L		T
No. 15 Ohio State +	6	–	2	–	0	9	–	3	–	0
No. 18 Iowa +	6	–	2	–	0	8	–	4	–	0
No. 12 Michigan	6	–	3	–	0	9	–	3	–	0
Illinois	6	–	3	–	0	7	–	4	–	0
Wisconsin	6	–	3	–	0	7	–	5	–	0
Minnesota	4	–	5	–	0	6	–	5	–	0
Michigan State	4	–	5	–	0	5	–	6	–	0
Purdue	3	–	6	–	0	5	–	6	–	0
Indiana	3	–	6	–	0	3	–	8	–	0
Northwestern	0	–	9	–	0	0	–	11	–	0
+ – Conference co-champions; Rankings from AP Poll

The 1981 Illinois Fighting Illini football team was an American football team that represented the University of Illinois as a member of the Big Ten Conference during the 1981 Big Ten season. In their second year under head coach Mike White, the Illini compiled a 7–4 record (6–3 in conference games), finished in three-way tie for third place in the Big Ten, and were outscored by a total of 288 to 287.

The team's statistical leaders included quarterback Tony Eason with 3,360 passing yards, running back Calvin Thomas with 390 rushing yards, and wide receiver Oliver Williams with 760 receiving yards. Several Illinois players ranked among the Big Ten leaders, including the following:

- Tony Eason led the conference with 248 pass completions, a 61.1 pass completion percentage, 3,360 passing yards, a 140.0 passing efficiency rating, 20 passing touchdowns, 14 interceptions, and 3,331 total yards.
- Oliver Williams ranked third in the conference with six receiving touchdowns and 20.0 yards per reception and ranked fifth in the conference with 760 receiving yards.
- Kirby Wilson ranked second in the conference with 546 kickoff return yards.
- Mike Bass ranked third in the conference with 33 extra points made, fifth with 10 field goals and a 58.8% field goal percentage, and sixth with 63 points scored.

The team played its home games at Memorial Stadium in Champaign, Illinois.

== Schedule ==
Date	Opponent	Site	Result	Attendance	Source
September 5	at No. 8 Pittsburgh*	Pitt Stadium; Pittsburgh, PA	L 6–26	46,022	
September 12	at Michigan State	Spartan Stadium; East Lansing, MI	W 27–17	54,945	
September 19	Syracuse*	Memorial Stadium; Champaign, IL	W 17–14	57,579	
October 3	Minnesota	Memorial Stadium; Champaign, IL	W 38–29	63,814	
October 10	at Purdue	Ross–Ade Stadium; West Lafayette, IN (rivalry)	L 20–44	69,846	
October 17	at Ohio State	Ohio Stadium; Columbus, OH (Illibuck)	L 27–34	87,158	
October 24	Wisconsin	Memorial Stadium; Champaign, IL	W 23–21	67,413	
October 31	No. 16 Iowa	Memorial Stadium; Champaign, IL	W 24–7	66,877	
November 7	at No. 12 Michigan	Michigan Stadium; Ann Arbor, MI (rivalry)	L 21–70	105,570	
November 14	Indiana	Memorial Stadium; Champaign, IL (rivalry)	W 35–14	56,143	
November 21	at Northwestern	Dyche Stadium; Evanston, IL (rivalry)	W 49–12	23,116	
*Non-conference game; Rankings from AP Poll released prior to the game

== Roster ==
1981 Illinois Fighting Illini football team roster
Players
Coaches
Offense

Pos.	#	Name	Class
RB	33	Mitchell Brookins	Jr
QB	3	Tony Eason	Jr
G	65	Marty Finis	Jr
OT	72	Dennis Flynn	Sr
C	55	Adam Lingner	Jr
WR	13	John Lopez	Sr
WR	4	Mike Martin	Jr
TE	86	Tim McAvoy	Sr
FB	42	Calvin Thomas	Sr
QB	11	Jack Trudeau	Fr
QB		John Wells	Jr
FB	44	Kevin West	Jr
WR	17	Oliver Williams	Jr

Defense

Pos.	#	Name	Class
DB	37	Charles Armstead	Jr
OLB	84	Kelvin Atkins	Sr
LB	61	Ed Brady	So
OLB	31	Pete Burgard	Sr
DT	51	Tom Buron	So
DT	53	Mark Butkus	So
OLB	57	Darryl Byrd	Jr
LB	29	Ron Ferrari	Sr
LB	34	Jack Squirek	Sr
DT	96	Don Thorp	So
DB	24	Mike Toney	Jr
DL	94	Mark Tuck	Jr
DB		Tom Varrige	Jr
OLB	7	John Vengoni	Sr

Special teams

Pos.	#	Name	Class

Head coach

- Mike White

Coordinators/assistant coaches

- Brad Childress (Wide receivers)

Legend

- (C) Team captain
- (S) Suspended
- (I) Ineligible
- Injured
- Redshirt

Roster

== Season summary ==
=== Northwestern ===
Tony Eason threw three touchdown passes to set the Big Ten single season record. The two teams overall combined to throw 109 passes, breaking the conference mark set earlier in the year by Minnesota and Ohio State.
