= Steve Bryant (American football) =

American football player (born 1959)

No. 81, 80
- Position: Wide receiver

Personal information
- Born: October 10, 1959 (age 67); Los Angeles, California, U.S.
- Listed height: 6 ft 2 in (1.88 m)
- Listed weight: 195 lb (88 kg)

Career information
- College: Purdue
- NFL draft: 1982: 4th round, 94th overall pick

Career history
- Houston Oilers (1982–1985); Indianapolis Colts (1987)

Awards and highlights
- Second-team All-American (1981); First-team All-Big Ten (1981)

Career NFL statistics
- Receptions: 36
- Receiving yards: 501
- Stats at Pro Football Reference

Steven Bryant (born October 10, 1959) is an American former professional football player who was a wide receiver for five seasons for the Houston Oilers and Indianapolis Colts. In 1985, Bryant appeared as a contestant on the game show Press Your Luck, where he won $16,655 in cash and prizes.
