= Keith Bostic (American football) =

American football player (born 1961)

No. 25, 47
- Position: Safety

Personal information
- Born: January 17, 1961 (age 65); Ann Arbor, Michigan, U.S.
- Listed height: 6 ft 1 in (1.85 m)
- Listed weight: 216 lb (98 kg)

Career information
- High school: Pioneer (Ann Arbor, Michigan)
- College: Michigan
- NFL draft: 1983: 2nd round, 42nd overall pick

Career history
- Houston Oilers (1983–1988); Indianapolis Colts (1989)*; Cleveland Browns (1990)
- * Offseason or practice squad member only

Awards and highlights
- Pro Bowl (1987); Second-team All-American (1982); First-team All-Big Ten (1982); 2× Second-team All-Big Ten (1980, 1981)

Career NFL statistics
- Sacks: 17
- Interceptions: 13
- Fumble recoveries: 7
- Stats at Pro Football Reference

William Keith Bostic (born January 17, 1961) is an American former professional football player who was a safety for seven seasons in the National Football League (NFL). He played for the Houston Oilers and the Cleveland Browns, serving as the Oilers' defensive captain under coach Jerry Glanville. Bostic earned one Pro Bowl selection and missed another based on a tiebreaker for the last safety chosen. In his Pro Bowl season, he led the American Football Conference in interceptions.

Prior to playing in the NFL, he played for the Michigan Wolverines of the Big Ten Conference from 1979–1982 NCAA Division I-A football season. During this time Michigan won two Big Ten championships, and Bostic was named first-team All-Big Ten. While at Michigan, he accumulated fumble recovery and interception statistics that continue to rank among the leaders in school history. Bostic had a reputation as a very physical safety.

== College ==
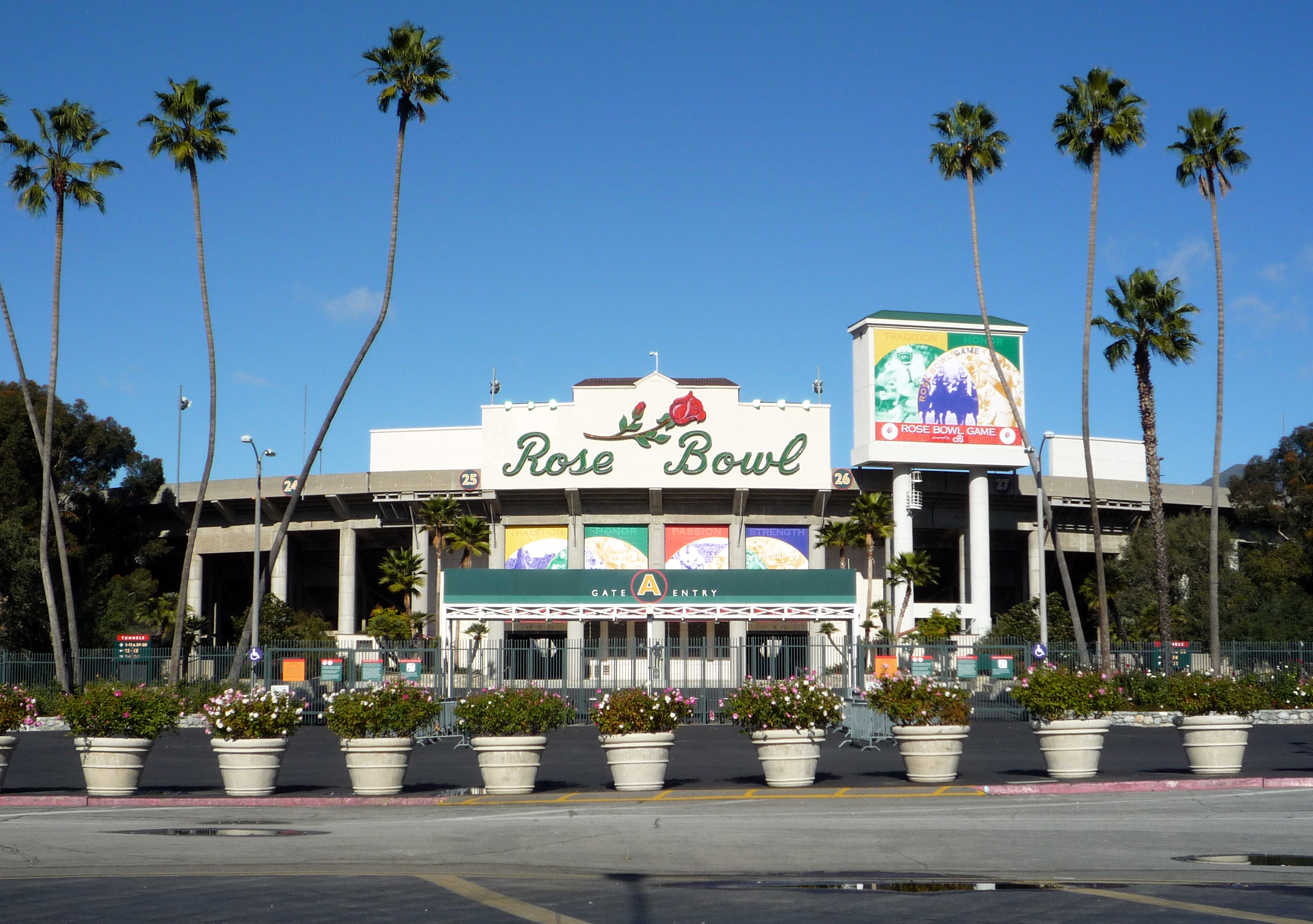
Bostic appeared in two Rose Bowls.

Born in Ann Arbor, Michigan, Bostic starred at his hometown Pioneer High School in Ann Arbor. He then stayed in Ann Arbor to play for the University of Michigan where he earned four varsity letters in football from 1979 to 1982 while wearing the #13. In college at the University of Michigan, Bostic started eight games in 1980, and he had an interception in the January 1, 1981 Rose Bowl for the 1980 Big Ten Conference Champions. This game was the first bowl game victory for Bo Schembechler. He started eleven games in 1981 and twelve in 1982. Bostic was first-team All-Big Ten for the 1982 Big Ten Champions who also went to the Rose Bowl. When he was drafted into the NFL, he was second on the modern Michigan career interceptions list (since 1965) with ten career interceptions, which places him in a tie for seventh on the list now. He ranks tenth on the All-time list. He ranks second on the All-time single-season fumble recovery list with four and fourth on the career list with six. His 119 interception return yards in 1982 ranks fifth all-time.

== Professional career ==
=== Pre-Bostic Oilers ===
During the 1970s Bum Phillips had traded away draft picks for veterans several times and between the 1974 NFL draft and the 1981 NFL draft the team only had four first round picks, but reached the AFC Championship game twice during the decade with veterans. They went to the playoffs in 1980 as well. However, by 1981 they were below .500 with an aging team. From the 1982 NFL draft to the 1987 NFL draft they had nine first round choices. They complemented their drafting with the signing of Warren Moon out of the Canadian Football League and Mike Rozier out of the United States Football League (USFL), a league that attempted to compete with the NFL in the 1980s.

=== Biles, Studley, Campbell era ===
Bostic was drafted with the fourteenth pick of the second round of the 1983 NFL draft with the 42nd pick overall by the Houston Oilers. He was also drafted by the Michigan Panthers of the United States Football League (USFL) in the 1983 Territorial Draft. Bostic joined the Oilers who were rebuilding from being the oldest average age NFL team in 1981.

Bostic started the last 12 games of the 1983 NFL season and every game thereafter as an Oiler until leaving the team in 1989. The 1983 Houston Oilers under coaches Ed Biles and Chuck Studley went 2–14. The 1984 and 1985 teams of Hugh Campbell also were below .500. By 1985 he had nonetheless become one of the best safeties in the league. During the 1985 NFL season he had a career-high five quarterback sacks, three interceptions and a fumble recovery.

=== Glanville era ===
Bostic's physical style of play was well-suited for Jerry Glanville who took over the Oilers' head coaching job for the 1986 NFL season after having been the team's defensive coordinator. Bostic signed a contract extension before the 1987 NFL season. Then, Bostic earned a Pro Bowl birth in 1987 and was named second-team All-Pro the same season. During the 1987 season he finished second in the NFL with a career-high six interceptions. That total led the American Football Conference (AFC), and he added three quarterback sacks and a fumble recovery that season. Glanville took the team to both the 1987-88 and 1988-89 NFL Playoffs. The unheralded 1987 team was a surprise playoff entrant in the first round Wild Card game. Even after a surprise 1987–88 NFL playoff run the Oilers fired their defensive backs coach, Tom Bettis who had taken over from Ken Houston. Bostic earned All-Pro honorable mention in 1988. That season, he finished tied for the third and final AFC safety Pro Bowl spot with David Fulcher and missed being invited due to the tiebreaker.

With all the rebuilding turnover Bostic was one of the four longest tenured Oilers by his sixth season with the team. He started 88 consecutive non-strike games for the Oilers. He was replaced by Bubba McDowell as the Oilers' starting strong safety. In 1989, the Oilers became fed up with Bostic for his untimely penalties and his moody and unpredictable personality. The Indianapolis Colts signed Bostic as a plan B free agent to a two-year $900,000 contract, but released him during training camp. They released him during the second week of training camp and it was rumored he might head to the Los Angeles Raiders. The Oilers lost a league high fifteen plan B free agents that season. In 1990, the Cleveland Browns signed Bostic as a free agent. However, they waived him during the season.

=== Overall reputation ===
Bostic's physical style of play was respected by his peers: Lester Hayes said Raider tight end Todd Christensen is the best receiving tight end and that "The only guy I've ever seen cover Todd is my son, Keith Bostic...Bostic's the only guy I've ever seen pulverize him. I mean he really pulverized him. I call Bostic and Frank Minnifield (Cleveland cornerback) my sons, my sons of dirt." Hayes meant that Bostic and Minnifield played a physical style, just like Hayes. Bostic is known as a big hitter blessed with athletic ability. He combined strength and speed to play his physical style according to Ozzie Newsome: "He's as strong as any linebacker and can run like any of the guys on the corner." Bostic earned the nickname "Batman" for his style of play. Instead of instructing his team to elect captains, Glanville instructed his team to "...pick the three toughest guys. If somebody throws a grenade into a room, they're the ones who'll jump on it." Bostic was the player chosen from the Oilers' defense. Although much is made of his strength and toughness, it should also be mentioned that he once collared Tony Dorsett from behind in a footrace. At one point in Bostic's career, while Glanville was still defensive coordinator, the Oilers considered moving him to cornerback because of his speed.

=== NFL single season record ===
Fewest interception return yards (1987): -14

== Personal life ==
During the offseasons, Bostic was a regular on the Oilers' summer basketball team that traveled around the state raising money for charities by playing various local All-star teams. After the team's twelfth season, Bostic had a reputation as the best player ever to play for the team. During one NFL training camp Bostic played with tape over his mouth to try to win a $20 bet with Steve Brown over who could keep from talking the longest.

His son, Tony Bostic, played running back for the New Mexico State Aggies as a non-recruited walk-on. His younger son, William, followed his father's footsteps and played linebacker for his alma mater, the University of Michigan.
