= Smiley Creswell =

American football player (born 1959)

No. 92
- Position: Defensive end

Personal information
- Born: December 11, 1959 (age 66); Everett, Washington, U.S.
- Listed height: 6 ft 4 in (1.93 m)
- Listed weight: 251 lb (114 kg)

Career information
- High school: Monroe (WA)
- College: Michigan State
- NFL draft: 1983: 5th round, 118th overall pick

Career history
- Philadelphia Eagles (1985); New England Patriots (1985)

Awards and highlights
- Second-team All-Big Ten (1982)

Career NFL statistics
- Sacks: 1
- Stats at Pro Football Reference

Smiley Creswell (born December 11, 1959) is an American former professional football player who was a defensive end in the National Football League (NFL). He played for the Philadelphia Eagles and New England Patriots in 1985 and also appeared in Super Bowl XX. He played college football for the Michigan State Spartans.
