= Paul Girgash =

American football player

No. 50 – Michigan Wolverines
- Position: Inside linebacker

Personal information
- Born: February 10, 1961 (age 65); Lakewood, Ohio, U.S.
- Listed height: 6 ft 1 in (1.85 m)
- Listed weight: 208 lb (94 kg)

Career information
- High school: St. Edward High School (Lakewood, Ohio)
- College: University of Michigan (1979–1982)

Awards and highlights
- First-team All-Big Ten (1982); Second-team All-Big Ten (1981)

Paul Girgash (born February 10, 1961) is a retired American football linebacker. He played for the University of Michigan from 1979 to 1982. He started 36 consecutive games at inside linebacker for Michigan from 1980 to 1982, played in the 1981 and 1983 Rose Bowls, and was selected as a first-team All-Big Ten player by both the Associated Press and the United Press International in 1982. Girgash later played professional football in the USFL for the Michigan Panthers in 1984.

== Early life ==
A native of Ohio, Girgash attended St. Edward High School in Lakewood, Ohio. As a senior in 1978, he was selected as a first-team member of the 1978 United Press International Class AAA All-Ohio Football Team.

== University of Michigan ==
Girgash enrolled at the University of Michigan in 1979 and played football under head coach Bo Schembechler from 1979 to 1982. He was the team's starter at inside linebacker for 36 consecutive games from 1980 to 1982.

As a sophomore, Girgash was a starter in every game for the 1980 team that gave up an average of 10.75 points per game, and only 1.8 points per game in the last five games of the season. The 1980 team won the Big Ten championship and defeated Washington in the 1981 Rose Bowl.

As a junior in 1981, Girgash again started every game for a Michigan team that finished the season with a victory over UCLA in the Bluebonnet Bowl. Girgash intercepted a pass in the bowl game and said afterward, "I think we were in a little better condition than UCLA, and in the last quarter both teams were tired. But I think we were able to 'suck it up' a little better."

As a senior, Girgash was selected by his teammates as a co-captain of the 1982 football team. That year, he twice had 19 tackles, once against Illinois and again in his final game against Ohio State. He also totaled 18 tackles against Notre Dame in 1982. At the end of the 1982 season, Girgash was selected by both the AP and the UPI as a first-team All-Big Ten linebacker. He was also selected to play in the January 1983 Japan Bowl in Yokohama, Japan. On the first play of the fourth quarter, Girgash intercepted a pass and ran it back to the 35-yard line where he fumbled the ball, resulting in a 65-yard runback for a touchdown by the West team.

In four years at Michigan, Girgash was credited with 352 tackles, including 206 solo tackles and 146 assists. At the time of his graduation in 1983, Girgash ranked third all-team in tackles in Michigan football history, trailing only Ron Simpkins and Mike Boren.

== Professional football ==
After graduating from Michigan, Girgash played professional football. In May 1983, he signed a contract with the Tampa Bay Buccaneers. He was released by the Buccaneers in late August 1983, prior to the start of the 1983 NFL season. In November 1983, Girgash signed as a free agent with the Michigan Panthers in the USFL. Girgash played for the Panthers during the 1984 USFL season and was traded to the Orlando Renegades in October 1984.

== Later life ==
After retiring from football, Girgash became the owner of E.W. Publishing Company, Inc., dba Fastsigns in Cleveland, Ohio.
