= Mike Boren =

American football player

No. 40
- Position: Linebacker

Personal information
- Born: c. 1962
- Listed height: 6 ft 3 in (1.91 m)
- Listed weight: 230 lb (104 kg)

Career information
- High school: Eastmoor Academy
- College: Michigan (1981–1983)

Awards and highlights
- Second-team All-Big Ten (1982)

Michael L. Boren (born c. 1962) is an American former football player. A native of Columbus, Ohio, he played college football as a linebacker at the University of Michigan from 1980 to 1983. He was Michigan's leading tackler as a sophomore and junior during the 1981 and 1982 seasons. He suffered a knee injury in the fourth game of the 1983 season that ended his playing career. He still ranks among Michigan's all-time career leaders in tackles.

== Early life ==
Boren was born in approximately 1962 and grew up in Columbus, Ohio. He attended high school at Eastmoor Academy in Columbus. Growing up in the shadow of Ohio State University, Boren noted that he "was born and raised Buckeye" and hating Michigan.

== University of Michigan ==
Not recruited by Ohio State, Boren enrolled at the University of Michigan and played college football as a linebacker for head coach Bo Schembechler's Michigan Wolverines football teams from 1980 to 1983. He was a backup at linebacker as a freshman in 1980.

Boren started all 12 games at inside linebacker for the 1981 Michigan Wolverines football team that compiled a 9-3 record and outscored opponents, 355-162. As a sophomore, he led the 1981 Wolverines with 144 tackles.

As a junior, Boren again started all 12 games at inside linebacker for the 1982 Michigan team that compiled an 8-4 record, won the Big Ten Conference championship and outscored opponents, 345-204. Boren registered 142 tackles in 1982, leading the Wolverines in tackles for the second consecutive year.

As a senior, Boren started only four games, all at inside linebacker, for the 1983 Wolverines. He sustained a career-ending knee injury against Indiana on October 1, 1983. Boren was limited to 43 tackles in four games as a senior, but his career total of 332 tackles ranks among the top ten in Michigan history.

Boren had seven games at Michigan in which he had at least 15 tackles. His best games at Michigan are as follows:

1. 1981 Navy: 13 tackles, 5 assists, 18 total
2. 1982 UCLA: 12 tackles, 6 assists, 18 total
3. 1982 at Illinois: 14 tackles, 3 assists, 17 total
4. 1982 Michigan State: 12 tackles, 5 assists, 17 total
5. 1981 at Purdue 8 tackles, 9 assists, 17 total 6. 1981 Ohio State: 9 tackles, 6 assists, 15 total
7. 1983 at Wisconsin: 9 tackles, 6 assists, 15 total

== Later years and family ==
Boren had intended to play in the NFL some day, but a knee injury in his senior season ended his football playing career. "I took football for granted, and then when I didn't have football anymore, I about cried," Boren recalled. When he graduated from Michigan, he had a degree in education, but he had no desire to be a teacher or a coach. Instead, he became the owner of three businesses.

Boren returned to Columbus after graduating, a city where natives such as Boren who went north to play Michigan football are referred to (sometimes in jest, sometimes not) as "traitors." On living in Columbus, Boren said: "It's like being in the belly of the beast. In the (1990s) it was a great place to live. Now, it's been a little hectic. Hey, it's humbling."

In 2005, when Michigan offered a scholarship to Boren's son, Justin Boren, Schembechler thought there was nothing to discuss. "Bo just said, 'He's your son. You tell him where he's going to go,'" Boren said with a laugh. "But I told Bo, 'I'm not going to tell him where to go. He has to make this decision for himself.'"

By the fall of 2006, Justin Boren had joined the Wolverines. On November 16, 2006, Boren was in Ann Arbor with his son where they both attended Schembechler's final address to the team before the Ohio State game. According to Boren, the speech had a sense of urgency. "He pretty much delivered it, and the guys were going nuts. It's a scary thing, and I hate to say it, but I think Bo knew something was wrong." Schembechler collapsed and died of heart failure the next morning. After the 2007 season, Justin Boren quit the University of Michigan and transferred to Ohio State University.
