= Tim Spencer (American football) =

American football player and coach (born 1960)

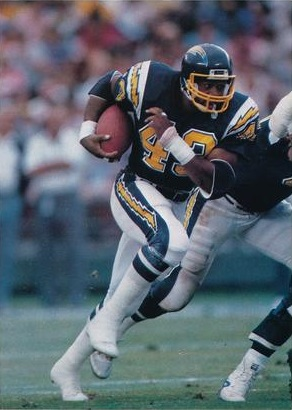
- Spencer c. 1985

No. 43, 46
- Position: Running back

Personal information
- Born: December 10, 1960 (age 65); Martins Ferry, Ohio, U.S.
- Listed height: 6 ft 1 in (1.85 m)
- Listed weight: 224 lb (102 kg)

Career information
- High school: St. Clairsville (St. Clairsville, Ohio)
- College: Ohio State
- NFL draft: 1983: 11th round, 307th overall pick

Career history

Playing
- Chicago Blitz (1983); Arizona Wranglers (1984); Memphis Showboats (1985); San Diego Chargers (1985–1990)

Coaching
- Ohio State (1994–2003) Running backs coach; Chicago Bears (2004–2012) Running backs coach; Tampa Bay Buccaneers (2014–2018) Running backs coach

Awards and highlights
- Second-team All-American (1982); 2× First-team All-Big Ten (1981, 1982)

Career NFL statistics
- Rushing yards: 1,792
- Rushing average: 3.8
- Touchdowns: 19
- Stats at Pro Football Reference

Timothy Arnold Spencer (born December 10, 1960) is an American former professional football player who was a running back in the United States Football League (USFL) and National Football League (NFL) from 1983 to 1990. He played college football for the Ohio State Buckeyes.

== Playing career ==
Spencer was selected by the Chicago Blitz of the USFL in 1983 after a college football career at Ohio State University, where he ran for 1,371 yards in his senior season with the Buckeyes. He closed out his career with 3,553 yards rushing and ranks fifth on the school's all-time rushing list, trailing only Archie Griffin (5,589), J. K. Dobbins (4,459), Ezekiel Elliott (3,961), and Eddie George (3,768). Spencer shared the backfield with Kevin Long as the starting running back with Chicago and rushed for 1157 yards on 300 carries with six touchdowns in his rookie season.

In 1984, Spencer played for the Arizona Wranglers and rushed for 1,212 yards on 227 carries for a 5.3 yards per carry average. He also ran for 17 touchdowns. The following season, he played for the Memphis Showboats and rushed for 789 yards on 198 carries with three touchdowns. Spencer finished as the 3rd leading rusher in USFL history.

In 1985, Spencer signed to play for the San Diego Chargers, the same NFL team that drafted him in the 11th round of the 1983 NFL draft. He rushed for 478 yards on 124 carries with 10 touchdowns that season. His biggest NFL season was in 1989, when he rushed for 521 yards on 134 carries. He was a limited reserve for the rest of his career with the Chargers and retired after the 1990 season.

== Coaching career ==
In 1994, Spencer returned to Ohio State to be their running backs coach, a position he held until 2003. On January 27, 2004, he was announced as the running backs coach for the Chicago Bears. Spencer was not retained by the Bears in 2013 following the hiring of Marc Trestman.

He joined Lovie Smith's staff at Tampa Bay for the 2014 season. In 2019, Spencer was not retained by coach Bruce Arians. He then joined the coaching staff at Lake Forest College in Lake Forest, Illinois as wide receivers coach.
