= 1982 Big Ten Conference football season =

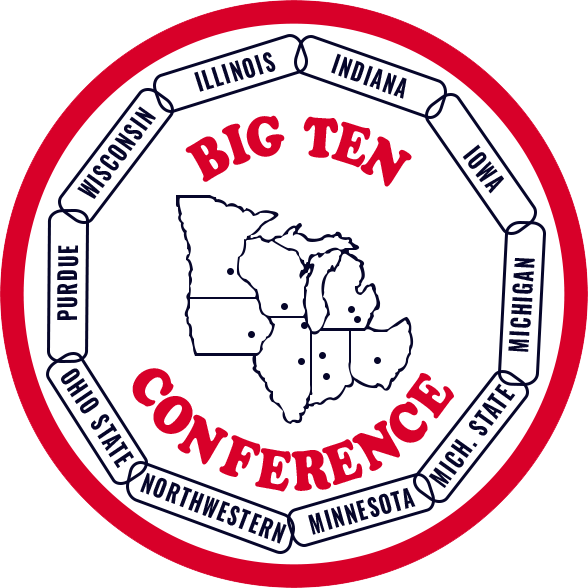
- League: NCAA Division I-A
- Sport: Football
- Teams: 10
- Top draft pick: Chris Hinton
- Champion: Michigan
- Runners-up: Ohio State
- Season MVP: Anthony Carter
- Top scorer: Mike Bass

Football seasons
- 1981 1983

1982 Big Ten Conference football standings
	Conf.					Overall
Team	W		L		T	W		L		T
Michigan $	8	–	1	–	0	8	–	4	–	0
No. 12 Ohio State	7	–	1	–	0	9	–	3	–	0
Iowa	6	–	2	–	0	8	–	4	–	0
Illinois	6	–	3	–	0	7	–	5	–	0
Wisconsin	5	–	4	–	0	7	–	5	–	0
Indiana	4	–	5	–	0	5	–	6	–	0
Purdue	3	–	6	–	0	3	–	8	–	0
Northwestern	2	–	7	–	0	3	–	8	–	0
Michigan State	2	–	7	–	0	2	–	9	–	0
Minnesota	1	–	8	–	0	3	–	8	–	0
$ – Conference champion; Rankings from AP Poll

The 1982 Big Ten Conference football season was the 87th season of college football played by the member schools of the Big Ten Conference and was a part of the 1982 NCAA Division I-A football season.

The 1982 Big Ten champion was Michigan. The Wolverines lost two of their first three games, then won seven consecutive games before losing to Ohio State and also losing to UCLA in the 1983 Rose Bowl. Michigan wide receiver Anthony Carter received the Chicago Tribune Silver Football trophy as the conference's most valuable player.

== Season overview ==
=== Results and team statistics ===
Conf. Rank	Team	Head coach	AP final	AP high	Overall record	Conf. record	PPG	PAG
1	Michigan	Bo Schembechler	NR	#10	8–4	8–1	28.8	17.0
2	Ohio State	Earle Bruce	#12	#12	9–3	7–1	29.0	17.3
3	Iowa	Hayden Fry	NR	NR	8–4	6–2	19.1	19.2
4	Illinois	Mike White	NR	#15	7–5	6–3	28.2	19.1
5	Wisconsin	Dave McClain	NR	NR	7–5	5–4	23.9	21.0
6	Indiana	Lee Corso	NR	NR	5–6	4–5	18.5	22.7
7	Purdue	Leon Burtnett	NR	NR	3–8	3–6	19.2	29.5
8 (tie)	Northwestern	Dennis Green	NR	NR	3–8	2–7	18.7	34.5
8 (tie)	Michigan State	Muddy Waters	NR	NR	2–9	2–7	18.4	22.0
10	Minnesota	Joe Salem	NR	NR	3–8	1–8	22.5	27.2

Key
AP final = Team's rank in the final AP Poll of the 1982 season
AP high = Team's highest rank in the AP Poll throughout the 1982 season
PPG = Average of points scored per game
PAG = Average of points allowed per game

=== Bowl games ===
Five Big Ten teams played in bowl games as follows:

- Michigan lost to UCLA, 24-14, in the 1983 Rose Bowl in Pasadena, California.
- Ohio State defeated BYU, 47-17, in the 1982 Holiday Bowl in San Diego.
- Iowa defeated Tennessee, 28-22, in the 1982 Peach Bowl in Atlanta.
- Illinois lost to Alabama, 21-15, in the 1982 Liberty Bowl in Memphis, Tennessee.
- Wisconsin defeated Kansas State, 14-3, in the 1982 Independence Bowl, in Shreveport, Louisiana.

== Statistical leaders ==
The Big Ten's individual statistical leaders include the following:

=== Passing yards ===
1. Tony Eason, Illinois (3,248)
2. Sandy Schwab, Northwestern (2,735)
3. Scott Campbell, Purdue (2,626)
4. Babe Laufenberg, Indiana (2,468)
5. Mike Hohensee, Minnesota (2,380)

=== Rushing yards ===
1. Tim Spencer, Ohio State (1,538)
2. Lawrence Ricks, Michigan (1,388)
3. Mel Gray, Purdue (916)
4. Eddie Phillips, Iowa (772)
5. Ricky Edwards, Northwestern (688)

=== Receiving yards ===
1. Mike Martin, Illinois (941)
2. Anthony Carter, Michigan (844)
3. Jon Harvey, Northwestern (807)
4. Duane Gunn, Indiana (764)
5. Cliff Benson, Purdue (762)

=== Total offense ===
1. Tony Eason, Illinois (3,258)
2. Sandy Schwab, Northwestern (2,555)
3. Scott Campbell, Purdue (2,508)
4. Mike Hohensee, Minnesota (2,418)
5. Babe Laufenberg, Indiana (2,351)

=== Passing efficiency rating ===
1. Tony Eason, Illinois (128.2)
2. Mike Tomczak, Ohio State (125.7)
3. Steve Smith, Michigan (125.1)
4. Chuck Long, Iowa (124.8)
5. Babe Laufenberg, Indiana (118.8)

=== Rushing yards per attempt ===
1. Troy King, Wisconsin (7.2)
2. Tony Hunter, Minnesota (5.7)
3. Tim Spencer, Ohio State (5.6)
4. Lawrence Ricks, Michigan (5.2)
5. Owen Gill, Iowa (5.1)

=== Yards per reception ===
1. Duane Gunn, Indiana (21.8)
2. Anthony Carter, Michigan (19.6)
3. John Boyd, Indiana (18.9)
4. Gary Williams, Ohio State (17.2)
5. Lonnie Farrow, Minnesota (16.6)

=== Points scored ===
1. Mike Bass, Illinois (101)
2. Tim Spencer, Ohio State (90)
3. Ali Haji-Sheikh, Michigan (77)
4. Rich Spangler, Ohio State (68)
5. Jim Gallery, Minnesota (61)

== 1983 NFL draft ==
The 1983 NFL draft was held in April 1983. The following Big Ten players were selected in the first five rounds of the draft:

Name	Position	Team	Round	Overall pick
Chris Hinton	Guard	Northwestern	1	4
Tony Eason	Quarterback	Illinois	1	15
Rich Strenger	Tackle	Michigan	2	40
Keith Bostic	Safety	Michigan	2	42
Steve Maidlow	Linebacker	Michigan St.	4	109
Smiley Creswell	Defensive end	Michigan St.	5	118
Matt Vandenboom	Defensive back	Wisconsin	5	126
Brett Miller	Tackle	Iowa	5	129
Otis Grant	Wide receiver	Michigan St.	5	134
Jerome Foster	Defensive tackle	Ohio St.	5	139
