= 1982 Michigan Wolverines football team =

American college football season

1982 Michigan Wolverines football

Big Ten champion

Rose Bowl, L 14–24 vs. UCLA
- Conference: Big Ten Conference

Ranking
- Coaches: No. 15
- Record: 8–4 (8–1 Big Ten)
- Head coach: Bo Schembechler (14th season)
- Defensive coordinator: Gary Moeller (5th season)
- MVP: Anthony Carter
- Captains: Anthony Carter; Paul Girgash; Robert Thompson
- Home stadium: Michigan Stadium

1982 Big Ten Conference football standings
	Conf.					Overall
Team	W		L		T	W		L		T
Michigan $	8	–	1	–	0	8	–	4	–	0
No. 12 Ohio State	7	–	1	–	0	9	–	3	–	0
Iowa	6	–	2	–	0	8	–	4	–	0
Illinois	6	–	3	–	0	7	–	5	–	0
Wisconsin	5	–	4	–	0	7	–	5	–	0
Indiana	4	–	5	–	0	5	–	6	–	0
Purdue	3	–	6	–	0	3	–	8	–	0
Northwestern	2	–	7	–	0	3	–	8	–	0
Michigan State	2	–	7	–	0	2	–	9	–	0
Minnesota	1	–	8	–	0	3	–	8	–	0
$ – Conference champion; Rankings from AP Poll

The 1982 Michigan Wolverines football team was an American football team that represented the University of Michigan in the 1982 Big Ten Conference football season. In their 14th season under head coach Bo Schembechler, the Wolverines compiled an 8–4 record (8–1 against conference opponents), won the Big Ten championship, lost to UCLA in the 1983 Rose Bowl, and outscored all opponents by a total of 345 to 204.

The team's statistical leaders included tailback Lawrence Ricks with 1,388 rushing yards, flanker Anthony Carter with 844 receiving yards, and quarterback Steve Smith with 1,735 passing yards and 2,124 yards of total offense, and placekicker Ali Haji-Sheikh with 77 points scored.

Anthony Carter was selected as a consensus first-team All-American and won the Chicago Tribune Silver Football award as the Big Ten's most valuable player. Defensive back Keith Bostic received second-team All-America honors. Eight Michigan players (Carter, Bostic, running back Lawrence Ricks, center Tom Dixon, offensive guard Stefan Humphries, offensive tackle Rich Strenger, and linebackers Paul Girgash and Robert Thompson) received first-team honors on the 1982 All-Big Ten Conference football team.

== Schedule ==
Date	Time	Opponent	Rank	Site	TV	Result	Attendance
September 11	1:00 p.m.	Wisconsin	No. 12	Michigan Stadium; Ann Arbor, MI		W 20–9	104,932
September 18	9:00 p.m.	at No. 20 Notre Dame*	No. 10	Notre Dame Stadium; [Notre Dame, IN (rivalry)	ABC	L 17–23	59,075
September 25	1:00 p.m.	No. 12 UCLA*	No. 20	Michigan Stadium; Ann Arbor, MI		L 27–31	105,413
October 2	1:00 p.m.	Indiana		Michigan Stadium; Ann Arbor, MI		W 24–10	104,385
October 9	1:00 p.m.	Michigan State		Michigan Stadium; Ann Arbor, MI (rivalry)		W 31–17	106,113
October 16	2:00 p.m.	at Iowa		Kinnick Stadium; Iowa City, IA		W 29–7	59,989
October 23	2:00 p.m.	at Northwestern		Dyche Stadium; Evanston, IL (rivalry)		W 49–14	34,121
October 30	1:00 p.m.	Minnesota^{†}	No. 20	Michigan Stadium; Ann Arbor, MI (Little Brown Jug)		W 52–14	105,619
November 6	12:30 p.m.	at Illinois	No. 15	Memorial Stadium; Champaign, IL (rivalry)	ABC	W 16–10	75,256
November 13	12:30 p.m.	Purdue	No. 14	Michigan Stadium; Ann Arbor, MI	CBS	W 52–21	105,281
November 20	12:30 p.m.	at Ohio State	No. 13	Ohio Stadium; Columbus, OH (The Game)	CBS	L 14–24	90,252
January 1, 1983	5:00 p.m.	vs. No. 5 UCLA*	No. 19	Rose Bowl; Pasadena, CA (Rose Bowl)	NBC	L 14–24	104,991
*Non-conference game; ^{†}Homecoming; Rankings from AP Poll released prior to the game; All times are in Eastern time

== Season summary ==
=== Wisconsin ===
Week 1: Wisconsin at Michigan

Team	1	2	3	4	Total
Wisconsin	9	0	0	0	9
• Michigan	7	6	0	7	20

- Date: September 11
- Location: Ann Arbor, MI
- Game attendance: 104,932

Scoring summary
1	8:51	MICH	Lawrence Ricks 4-yard run (Ali Haji-Sheikh kick)	MICH 7–0
1	2:36	WIS	Mark Doran 32-yard field goal	MICH 7–3
1	0:37	WIS	Randy Wright 1-yard run (kick blocked by Boren)	WIS 9–7
2	5:28	MICH	Rick Rogers 2-yard run (run failed)	MICH 13–9
4		MICH	Steve Smith 1-yard run (Haji-Sheikh kick)	MICH 20–9

On September 11, 1982, Michigan defeated Wisconsin, 20–9, before a crowd of 104,932 at Michigan Stadium. One year earlier, Wisconsin had defeated No. 1 Michigan in the season opener. Lawrence Ricks rushed for 153 yards on 24 carries, including a four-yard touchdown run. Quarterback Steve Smith completed 12 of 19 passes for 107 yards and threw two interceptions. Senior flanker Anthony Carter caught only one pass. Wisconsin's touchdown, scored with 37 seconds left in the first half, followed a Smith interception at Michigan's 29-yard line. Wisconsin's defense was called for five personal foul penalties, and Wisconsin coach Dave McLain stated after the game that he believed the Michigan fans had intimidated the officials.

=== Notre Dame ===
Week 2: Michigan at Notre Dame

Team	1	2	3	4	Total
Michigan	0	0	7	10	17
• Notre Dame	3	10	10	0	23

- Date: September 18
- Location: South Bend, IN
- Game attendance: 59,075

Scoring summary
1	12:38	ND	Mike Johnston 35-yard field goal	ND 3–0
2	14:01	ND	Larry Moriarty 24-yard run (Johnston kick)	ND 10–0
2		ND	Johnston 37-yard field goal	ND 13–0
3		MICH	Anthony Carter 72-yard punt return (Ali Haji-Sheikh kick)	ND 10–7
3	7:22	ND	Johnston 41-yard field goal	ND 16–7
3	1:55	ND	Greg Bell 10-yard run (Johnston kick)	ND 23–7
4		MICH	Haji-Sheikh 42-yard field goal	ND 23–10
4		MICH	Rick Rogers 39-yard pass from Steve Smith (Haji-Sheikh kick)	ND 23–17

On September 18, 1982, Michigan lost to Notre Dame, 23–17, before a crowd of 59,075 at Notre Dame Stadium in South Bend, Indiana. It was the first night game ever played at Notre Dame. Anthony Carter returned a punt 72 yards for a touchdown in the third quarter. Mike Johnston kicked three field goals for Notre Dame. Two fumbles by Steve Smith resulted in 10 Notre Dame points. He fumbled on the first play from scrimmage, leading to a Notre Dame field goal after two minutes of play.

After starting the first two games of the season, defensive back Brad Cochran quit the football team and left school. He returned to the team in 1983 and became a consensus All-American in 1985.

=== UCLA ===
Week 3: UCLA at Michigan

Team	1	2	3	4	Total
• UCLA	0	14	14	3	31
Michigan	7	17	3	0	27

- Date: September 25
- Location: Ann Arbor, MI
- Game attendance: 105,413

Scoring summary
1		MICH	Lawrence Ricks 9-yard run (Ali Haji-Sheikh kick)	MICH 7–0
2		MICH	Steve Smith 6-yard run (Haji-Sheikh kick)	MICH 14–0
2	7:31	MICH	Anthony Carter 5-yard pass from Smith (Haji-Sheikh kick)	MICH 21–0
2	12:57	UCLA	Williams 46-yard pass from Tom Ramsey (John Lee kick)	MICH 21–7
2		UCLA	Ramsey 1-yard run (Lee kick)	MICH 21–14
2		MICH	Haji-Sheikh 47-yard field goal	MICH 24–14
3		UCLA	JoJo Townsell 6-yard pass from Ramsey (Lee kick)	MICH 24–21
3	4:32	MICH	Haji-Sheikh 48-yard field goal	MICH 27–21
3		UCLA	Kevin Nelson 2-yard run (Lee kick)	UCLA 28–27
4		UCLA	Lee 26-yard field goal	UCLA 31–27

On September 25, 1982, Michigan lost to UCLA, 31–27, before a crowd of 105,413 at Michigan Stadium. Michigan took a 21–0 lead in the second quarter, but UCLA quarterback Tom Ramsey completed 22 of 36 passes for 311 yards and two touchdowns to lead a 28-point comeback. After a slow start in the first two games of the season, Anthony Carter caught eight passes for 123 yards and a touchdown. Steve Smith completed 14 of 37 passes and was intercepted three times. Lawrence Ricks rushed for 98 yards. Michigan drove deep into UCLA territory in the final minute and had a first-and-goal from the eight-yard line, but Smith threw three incomplete passes into the end zone before time ran out.

=== Indiana ===
Week 4: Indiana at Michigan

Team	1	2	3	4	Total
Indiana	0	0	3	7	10
• Michigan	3	7	7	7	24

- Date: October 2
- Location: Ann Arbor, MI
- Game attendance: 104,385

Scoring summary
1	MICH	Ali Haji-Sheikh 50-yard field goal	MICH 3–0
2	MICH	Steve Smith 37-yard run (Haji-Sheikh kick)	MICH 10–0
3	MICH	Dan Rice 1-yard run (Haji-Sheikh kick)	MICH 17–0
3	IU	D. Smith 20-yard field goal	MICH 17–3
4	IU	Duane Gunn 8-yard pass from Babe Laufenberg (D. Smith kick)	MICH 17–10
4	MICH	Lawrence Ricks 23-yard run (Haji-Sheikh kick)	MICH 24–10

On October 2, 1982, Michigan defeated Lee Corso's Indiana Hoosiers by a 24–10 score before a crowd of 104,385 at Michigan Stadium. Michigan fans booed the conservative play-calling late in the first half. Michigan ran 62 times and passed only 10 times in the game. Lawrence Ricks led the Michigan backs with 124 yards and a touchdown on 22 carries. After the game, coach Schembechler said: "The booers can go to hell."

=== Michigan State ===
Week 5: Michigan State at Michigan

Team	1	2	3	4	Total
Michigan State	0	3	0	14	17
• Michigan	7	14	10	0	31

- Date: October 9
- Location: Ann Arbor, MI
- Game attendance: 106,113

Scoring summary
1	MICH	Steve Smith 2-yard run (Ali Haji-Sheikh kick)	MICH 7–0
2	MICH	Lawrence Ricks 7-yard run (Haji-Sheikh kick)	MICH 14–0
2	MICH	Craig Dunaway 7-yard pass from Smith (Haji-Sheikh kick)	MICH 21–0
2	MSU	Ralf Mojsiejenko 31-yard field goal	MICH 21–3
3	MICH	Haji-Sheikh 27-yard field goal	MICH 24–3
3	MICH	Anthony Carter 14-yard pass from Smith (Haji-Sheikh kick)	MICH 31–3
4	MSU	Jones 7-yard pass from John Leister (pass failed)	MICH 31–9
4	MSU	McClelland 4-yard run (Grant pass from Leister)	MICH 31–17

On October 9, 1982, Michigan defeated Michigan State, 31–17, before a crowd of 106,113 at Michigan Stadium. Michigan quarterback Steve Smith completed 10 of 20 passes for 182 yards and two touchdowns (one to Craig Dunaway and the other to Anthony Carter). Smith also rushed for a touchdown, and Lawrence Ricks tallied 95 rushing yards and a touchdown on 19 carries. Carter's touchdown set a new Big Ten record of 31 touchdown catches, breaking the prior record of 30 held by Jade Butcher. He also set a new Michigan career record with 134 receptions, breaking the previous record of 132 held by Jack Clancy. He also moved into second place among Michigan's career scoring leaders with 206 points, trailing only Tom Harmon with 237 points. The Detroit Free Press described the Spartans as "inept, disorganized, disspirited and injured both mentally and physically."

=== Iowa ===
Week 6: Michigan at Iowa

Team	1	2	3	4	Total
• Michigan	0	12	3	14	29
Iowa	0	0	0	7	7

- Date: October 16
- Location: Iowa City, IA
- Game attendance: 59,989

Scoring summary
2		MICH	Safety, blocked punt out of end zone	MICH 2-0
2	4:54	MICH	Ali Haji-Sheikh 44-yard field goal	MICH 5-0
2		MICH	Vince Bean 11-yard pass from Steve Smith (Haji-Sheikh kick)	MICH 12-0
3		MICH	Haji-Sheikh 26-yard field goal	MICH 15-0
4		MICH	Rick Rogers 5-yard run (Haji-Sheikh kick)	MICH 22-0
4	6:28	MICH	Rogers 1-yard run (Haji-Sheikh kick)	MICH 29-0
4		IOWA	Mike Hufford 8-yard pass from Chuck Long (Nichol kick)	MICH 29-7

On October 16, 1982, Michigan defeated Iowa, 29–7, before a crowd of 59,989 at Kinnick Stadium in Iowa City. After a scoreless first quarter, Michigan scored 12 points in the second quarter on a safety (Carlton Rose blocked an Iowa punt out of the end zone), a 44-yard field goal by Ali Haji-Sheikh, and an 11-yard touchdown pass from Steve Smith to split end Vince Bean. Haji-Sheikh added a second field goal in the third quarter, and tailback Rick Rogers scored two touchdowns in the fourth quarter. Lawrence Ricks gained 120 yards on 18 carries. Late in the fourth quarter, Iowa quarterback Chuck Long put the Hawkeyes on the scoreboard with an eight-yard touchdown pass to Mike Hufford. Long completed 19 of 32 passes for 220 yards.

=== Northwestern ===
Week 7: Michigan at Northwestern

Team	1	2	3	4	Total
• Michigan	7	35	7	0	49
Northwestern	0	0	0	14	14

- Date: October 23
- Location: Evanston, IL
- Game attendance: 34,121

Scoring summary
1		MICH	Lawrence Ricks 1-yard run (Ali Haji-Sheikh kick)	MICH 7–0
2		MICH	Steve Smith 11-yard run (Haji-Sheikh kick)	MICH 14–0
2		MICH	Smith 1-yard run (Haji-Sheikh kick)	MICH 21–0
2		MICH	Anthony Carter 34-yard pass from Smith (Haji-Sheikh kick)	MICH 28–0
2		MICH	Carter 29-yard pass from Smith (Haji-Sheikh kick)	MICH 35–0
2		MICH	Craig Dunaway 12-yard pass from Smith (Haji-Sheikh kick)	MICH 42–0
3		MICH	Keith Bostic 54-yard interception return (Haji-Sheikh kick)	MICH 49–0
4		NU	Sandy Schwab 1-yard run (Jolas kick)	MICH 49–7
4	8:38	NU	Ricky Edwards 1-yard run (Jolas kick)	MICH 49–14

On October 23, 1982, Michigan defeated Northwestern, 49–14, before a crowd of 34,121 at Dyche Stadium in Evanston, Illinois. Northwestern's freshman quarterback Sandy Schwab broke NCAA single-game records with 45 pass completions and 71 attempted passes, and also broke a Northwestern single-game record with 436 passing yards. Despite Schwab's numbers, Northwestern was unable to score until the fourth quarter. Michigan led, 42–0, at halftime. Michigan quarterback Steve Smith completed 10 of 12 passes for 203 yards and three touchdowns, while also rushing for 71 yards and two touchdowns. Anthony Carter caught three passes for 79 yards and two touchdowns. With the two touchdowns, Carter became Michigan's all-time touchdown leader with 36, breaking the previous record of 34 held by Rick Leach.

=== Minnesota ===
Week 8: Minnesota at Michigan

Team	1	2	3	4	Total
Minnesota	0	7	0	7	14
• Michigan	7	24	14	7	52

- Date: October 30
- Location: Ann Arbor, MI
- Game attendance: 105,619

Scoring summary
1		MICH	Anthony Carter 29-yard pass from Steve Smith (Ali Haji-Sheikh kick)	MICH 7-0
2	12:10	MICH	Steve Smith 6-yard run (Haji-Sheikh kick)	MICH 14-0
2	7:55	MICH	Dan Rice 1-yard pass from Smith (Haji-Sheikh kick)	MICH 21-0
2	4:14	MICH	Rick Rogers 10-yard run (Haji-Sheikh kick)	MICH 28-0
2		MINN	Dwayne McMullen 13-yard pass from Mike Hohensee (Jim Gallery kick)	MICH 28-7
2	1:17	MICH	Haji-Sheikh 24-yard field goal	MICH 31-7
3	9:42	MICH	Craig Dunaway 42-yard pass from S. Smith (Haji-Sheikh kick)	MICH 38-7
3		MICH	Kerry Smith 6-yard run (Haji-Sheikh kick)	MICH 45-7
4		MINN	Frank Jacobs 3-yard run (Gallery kick)	MICH 45-14
4	2:40	MINN	Greg Armstrong 17-yard pass from Dave Hall (Haji-Sheikh kick)	MICH 52-14

On October 30, 1982, Michigan defeated Minnesota, 52–14, before a crowd of 105,619 at Michigan Stadium. In the first quarter, Steve Smith Smith completed a 29-yard touchdown pass to Anthony Carter. Michigan added 24 points in the second quarter and 14 more in the third quarter. Smith completed 10 of 16 passes for 159 yards and three touchdowns, and Lawrence Ricks rushed for 135 yards on 18 carries. With the win, the Wolverines retained the Little Brown Jug for a fifth consecutive year.

=== Illinois ===
Week 9: Michigan at Illinois

Team	1	2	3	4	Total
• Michigan	7	3	6	0	16
Illinois	3	7	0	0	10

- Date: November 6
- Location: Champaign, IL
- Game attendance: 75,256
- TV announcers (ABC): Keith Jackson, Frank Broyles

Scoring summary
1		ILL	Mike Bass 26-yard field goal	ILL 3–0
1	6:44	MICH	Anthony Carter 40-yard pass from Steve Smith (Ali Haji-Sheikh kick)	MICH 7–3
2	7:31	MICH	Haji-Sheikh 30-yard field goal	MICH 10–3
2		ILL	Martin 7-yard pass from Tony Eason (Bass kick)	TIE 10–10
3		MICH	Haji-Sheikh 45-yard field goal	MICH 13–10
3	4:12	MICH	Haji-Sheikh 47-yard field goal	MICH 16–10

On November 6, 1982, Michigan defeated Illinois, 16–10, at Memorial Stadium in Champaign, Illinois. The crowd of 75,256 set a new Memorial Stadium record. Illinois was led by All-Big Ten quarterback Tony Eason.

Illinois drove down the field after the opening kickoff and scored on a 26-yard field goal by Mike Bass. With 6:44 remaining in the first quarter, Michigan took the lead on a 40-yard touchdown pass from Steve Smith to Anthony Carter. Carter caught the ball on a crossing pattern at the 25-yard and, with a good block from Vince Bean, sprinted down the sideline to the end zone. After Evan Cooper intercepted an Eason pass near the end of the first quarter, Steve Smith led the Wolverines down the field, and Ali Haji-Sheikh kicked a 30-yard field goal. Later in the quarter, Eason threw a seven-yard touchdown pass to Oliver Martin, and the game was tied, 10–10, at halftime.

In the third quarter, Haji-Sheikh kicked field goals of 45 and 47 yards to retake the lead at 16–10. Late in the fourth quarter, Eason led the Illini 90 yards from their own eight-yard line to Michigan's two-yard line. With 27 seconds remaining, Illinois had a fourth-and-goal from the two, but a wall of Michigan's defenders stopped tailback Dwight Beverly for no gain.

Illinois out-gained Michigan, 515 yards to 354. Eason completed 28 of 47 passes for 272 yards, a touchdown, and two interceptions. Steve Smith completed six of 18 passes for 130 yards and a touchdown. Lawrence Ricks led Michigan's backs with 182 yards on 31 carries. Anthony Carter caught five passes for 125 yards and also ran for 17 yards.

=== Purdue ===
Week 10: Purdue at Michigan

Team	1	2	3	4	Total
Purdue	0	7	0	14	21
• Michigan	14	17	0	21	52

- Date: November 13
- Location: Ann Arbor, MI
- Game attendance: 105,281
- TV announcers (CBS): Verne Lundquist, Dennis Franklin

Scoring summary
1	8:47	MICH	Anthony Carter 48-yard pass from Steve Smith (Ali Haji-Sheikh kick)	MICH 7-0
1		MICH	Lawrence Ricks 4-yard run (Haji-Sheikh kick)	MICH 14-0
2		MICH	Haji-Sheikh 26-yard field goal	MICH 17-0
2		PUR	Mel Gray 1-yard run (Clark kick)	PUR 17-7
2		MICH	S. Smith 1-yard run (run failed)	MICH 23-7
2		MICH	Ricks 1-yard run (Carter pass from S. Smith)	MICH 31-7
4		PUR	Cliff Benson 4-yard pass from Scott Campbell (Clark kick)	MICH 31-14
4		MICH	Kerry Smith 1-yard run (Haji-Sheikh kick)	MICH 38-14
4		MICH	Carter 62-yard pass from S. Smith (Haji-Sheikh kick)	MICH 45-14
4		PUR	Rick Brunner 12-yard pass from Campbell (Clark kick)	MICH 45-21
4		Michigan	Eddie Garrett 6-yard run (Haji-Sheikh kick)	Michigan 52-21

On November 13, 1982, Michigan defeated Purdue, 52–21, before a crowd of 105,281 at Michigan Stadium. The game was broadcast nationally on CBS, and the win clinched the Big Ten title and Rose Bowl berth for Michigan. For the first time since 1971, the Michigan-Ohio State game did not determine the Big Ten championship.

In the first quarter, Michigan opened the scoring with a 48-yard touchdown pass from quarterback Steve Smith to flanker Anthony Carter. Still in the first quarter, Michigan drove down the field and scored on a four-yard run by tailback Lawrence Ricks. In the second quarter, Al Sincich recovered a Boilermaker fumble at Purdue's 25-yard line to set up a 26-yard field goal by Ali Haji-Sheikh. The field goal was his 12th of the year, setting a new Michigan single-season record.

In the second quarter, Purdue's Mel Gray scored on a one-yard run to narrow Michigan's lead to 17–7. Michigan answered with a one-yard touchdown run by Steve Smith. On the next possession Gray fumbled, and Keith Bostic recovered the ball at Purdue's 33-yard line. Ricks scored from the one, and Michigan led, 31–7, at halftime.

After a scoreless third quarter, the teams combined for 35 points in the fourth quarter. Purdue scored on a four-yard pass from Scott Campbell to Greg Benson. Marion Body intercepted a Boilermaker pass at the Purdue 23-yard line and returned it to the five-yard line. Reserve tailback Kerry Smith scored on a one-yard run. John Lott intercepted another Purdue pass, and Smith threw a 62-yard touchdown pass to Anthony Carter. Michigan led, 45–14. Freshman fullback Eddie Garrett scored Michigan's final touchdown.

In his final game at Michigan Stadium, Anthony Carter caught three passes for 123 yards, two of the catches for touchdowns. Lawrence Ricks led Michigan's backs with a career-high 196 rushing yards on 31 carries. Steve Smith completed nine of 13 passes for 184 yards and was intercepted once. Purdue quarterback Scott Campbell completed 29 of 49 passes for 331 yards with two touchdowns and two interceptions. Purdue committed a total of six turnovers on four fumbles and the two interceptions.

After the game, thousands of fans ran onto the field to tear down the newly reinforced and supposedly "fan resistant" goalposts. Ann Arbor police defended the goal posts, and one fan and one officer were injured in the melee that followed. Fans succeeded in tearing down the south goal post, though the north post remained. Fans carried the south goal post out of the stadium, down State Street, and to the doorstep of university president Harold Shapiro. Shapiro posed for pictures with students and the goalpost.

=== Ohio State ===
Week 11: Michigan at Ohio State

Team	1	2	3	4	Total
Michigan	7	0	7	0	14
• Ohio State	0	14	0	10	24

- Date: November 20
- Location: Columbus, OH
- Game start: 12:30 p.m. EST
- Game attendance: 90,252
- Game weather: Rain, 65 °F (18 °C)
- Referee: Tom Quinn
- TV announcers (CBS): Gary Bender, Pat Haden

Scoring summary
1	2:11	MICH	Lawrence Ricks 1-yard run (Ali Haji-Sheikh kick)	MICH 7–0
2	6:53	OSU	Vaughn Broadnax 6-yard run (Rick Spangler kick)	TIE 7–7
2	0:33	OSU	Tim Spencer 2-yard run (Spangler kick)	OSU 14–7
3	2:38	MICH	Steve Smith 4-yard run (Haji-Sheikh kick)	Tie 14–14
4	6:27	OSU	Spencer 1-yard run (Spangler kick)	OSU 21–14
4	3:27	OSU	Spangler 33-yard field goal	OSU 24–14

On November 20, 1982, Michigan lost to Ohio State, 24–14, before a crowd of 90,252 at Ohio Stadium in Columbus, Ohio.

Michigan turned the ball over six times on three interceptions and three fumbles. The most costly turnover occurred in the fourth quarter with the score tied at 14–14. Michigan quarterback Steve Smith ran an option play and pitched to Anthony Carter; Carter was hit hard by two Buckeye defenders and the ball popped loose and was recovered at Michigan's 14-yard line. After the Carter fumble, Ohio State ran three plays culminating with the game-winning touchdown on a one-yard run by Tim Spencer. Michigan coach Bo Schembechler defended Carter after the game: "We pitched the ball late, poor damn kid. That's a bad deal. One of those things. Ah, shoot."

An earlier fumble was the result of what Schembechler called Ohio State cheating. Ohio State linebacker Marcus Marek shouted signals, mocking the cadence of Michigan's quarterback, and causing Michigan center Tom Dixon to snap too soon. Schembechler said his staff had seen Ohio State utilize the illegal technique on film and had read about it in a Columbus newspaper story. Schembechler said he alerted the officials to the tactic before the game, but no violation was called.

Smith completed 12 of 28 passes for 127 yards and was intercepted three times, while Ohio State quarterback Mike Tomczak completed 10 of 17 passes for 159 yards. Michigan running back Lawrence Ricks rushed for 110 yards and a touchdown on 27 carries, while Tim Spencer gained 124 yards and scored two touchdowns on 27 carries.

=== 1983 Rose Bowl ===
1983 Rose Bowl

Team	1	2	3	4	Total
Michigan	0	0	7	7	14
• UCLA	7	3	7	7	24

- Date: January 1
- Location: Pasadena, CA
- Game attendance: 104,991
- Game weather: Sunny, 79 °F (26 °C)
- TV announcers (NBC): Dick Enberg, Merlin Olsen, Bill Macatee

Scoring summary
1	3:27	UCLA	Tom Ramsey 1-yard run (John Lee kick)	UCLA 7–0
2		UCLA	Lee 39-yard field goal	UCLA 10–0
3	5:16	MICH	Eddie Garrett, one-yard pass from Dave Hall (Ali Haji-Sheikh kick)	UCLA 10–7
3	0:12	UCLA	Danny Andrews 9-yard run (Lee kick)	UCLA 17–7
4	8:08	UCLA	Blanchard Montgomery 11-yard interception return (Lee kick)	UCLA 24–7
4	5:20	MICH	Dan Rice, 4-yard pass from Hall	UCLA 24–14

On January 1, 1983, Michigan, ranked No. 19 by the AP, lost to No. 5 UCLA, 24–14, before a crowd of 104,991 at the 1983 Rose Bowl in Pasadena, California.

On Michigan's third play from scrimmage, All-Big Ten offensive tackle Rich Strenger sustained an injury to his knee and ankle and did not return to the game. After the game, Michigan coach Bo Schembechler said: "If there's one guy we couldn't lose, it was Strenger, and we lost him on the third play of the game. . . But I'm not trying to alibi, because if you're a good team, you adjust to your losses."

Late in the first quarter, UCLA drove 80 yards, aided by a pass interference penalty that resulted in a first-and-goal. Tom Ramsey ran for the touchdown on a quarterback sneak from the one-yard line.

Early in the second quarter, Michigan quarterback Steve Smith led a drive to the UCLA 19-yard line, but a Smith pass was tipped up in the air and intercepted. On the next possession by Michigan, Smith suffered a separated shoulder when he was hit hard by Don Rogers after an eight-yard gain. Smith did not return to the game and was replaced at quarterback by Dave Hall. Prior to the Rose Bowl, Hall had completed seven of 14 passes, principally appearing in games where Michigan was well ahead. Hall also lacked the mobility to lead Michigan's option offense.

Later in the second quarter, Michigan forced UCLA to punt from deep in its own territory, but Anthony Carter fumbled trying to grab the bouncing punt. The Bruins recovered at midfield and, seven plays later, John Lee kicked a 39-yard field goal with less than 30 seconds left in the half.

In the third quarter, Michigan drove 47 yards, capped by a one-yard touchdown pass from Hall to fullback Eddie Garrett on fourth down. Michigan trailed by only three points with 5:15 remaining in the third quarter. UCLA then responded with an 80-yard, 13-play drive during which Ramsey completed two third-down passes. The drive ended with a nine-yard touchdown run by tailback Danny Andrews.

Early in the fourth quarter, UCLA threatened to put the game out of reach, driving 65 yards, but the Wolverine defense held on fourth-and-goal from the one-yard line. However, when Michigan took over, Dave Hall was intercepted by Blanchard Montgomery who returned Hall's pass 11 yards for a touchdown. At that point, UCLA led by 17 points with eight minutes remaining in the game. After Montgomery's interception, Anthony Carter returned the kickoff to the 45-yard line. Hall then led the Wolverines down the field, completing a long throw to Craig Dunaway at the four-yard line, and then completing a touchdown pass to freshman fullback Dan Rice with 5:20 remaining in the game. Haji-Sheikh's attempted onside kick was grabbed by UCLA, and the Bruins ran the clock under two minutes before punting. Hall led the Wolverines to the UCLA 18-yard line, but time ran out before Michigan could advance further.

Tom Ramsey completed 18 of 25 passes for 162 yards. For Michigan, Dave Hall completed 13 of 24 passes for 155 yards, Lawrence Ricks rushed for 88 yards on 23 carries, and Craig Dunaway caught five passes for 110 yards.

=== Award season ===
Wide receiver Anthony Carter was a consensus All-American, having received first-team honors from American Football Coaches Association (AFCA), Associated Press (AP), Football Writers Association of America, United Press International, Gannett News Service (GNS), Newspaper Enterprise Association (NEA), The Sporting News, and the Walter Camp Football Foundation (WCFF).

Carter also won the Chicago Tribune Silver Football award as the most valuable player in the Big Ten Conference. Carter edged out Illinois quarterback Tony Eason in close voting. Votes were cast by Big Ten coaches and officials and three representatives of the Chicago Tribune. Carter received 11 first-place votes to 10 for Eason. During his career, Carter set an NCAA record with an average of 17.4 yards per touch (including receptions, rushing carries, and kick returns). He also set Big Ten records with 3,017 receiving yards, 37 touchdown receptions, and 1,548 yards on kickoff returns.

Defensive back Keith Bostic was selected by both the AP and UPI as a second-team All-American.

Eight Michigan players were selected by the AP (media) and/or UPI (Big Ten coaches) as first or second-team players on the 1981 All-Big Ten Conference football team. They were: Anthony Carter (AP-1, UPI-1), Keith Bostic (AP-1, UPI-1), running back Lawrence Ricks (AP-1, UPI-1), offensive guard Stefan Humphries (AP-1, UPI-1), center Tom Dixon (AP-1, UPI-1), offensive tackle Rich Strenger (AP-1), linebacker Robert Thompson (AP-1, UPI-1), and linebacker Paul Girgash (AP-1, UPI-1). Four additional players received second-team honors: quarterback Steve Smith (AP-2), defensive lineman Winfred Carraway (UPI-2), linebacker Mike Boren (AP-2, UPI-2), and placekicker Ali Haji-Sheikh (AP-2, UPI-2).

Team awards were presented as follows:

- Most Valuable Player: Anthony Carter
- Meyer Morton Award: Stefan Humphries
- John Maulbetsch Award: Mark Hammerstein
- Frederick Matthei Award: Steve Smith
- Arthur Robinson Scholarship Award: Craig Dunaway
- Dick Katcher Award: Robert Thompson
- Robert P. Ufer Award: Jerry Burgei

== Personnel ==
=== Full roster ===
1982 Michigan Wolverines football team roster
Players
Coaches
Offense

Pos.	#	Name	Class
WR	5	Earl Allen	So
FB	34	Greg Armstrong	Jr
C	59	Art Balourdos	So
SE	25	Vincent Bean	Jr
OT	74	Bruce Brown	So
FL	1	Anthony Carter (C)	Sr
TE	83	Milt Carthens	Jr
TB	26	Nate Davis	Sr
WR	82	Ricky Davis	Sr
QB	9	Dan Decker	Fr
G	64	Jerry Diorio	Jr
C	69	Tom Dixon	Jr
TE	88	Craig Dunaway	Sr
OL	72	Rick Frazer	Fr
FB	32	Eddie Garrett	Fr
OT	54	Tom Garrity	Sr
G	58	John Ghindia	So
QB	7	David Hall	Jr
OL	78	Mark Hammerstein	Fr
WR	22	Mickey Hanlon	Sr
QB	4	Jim Harbaugh	Fr
FB	33	Gary Haynes
G	76	Stefan Humphries	Jr
FB	35	Jerald Ingram	Sr
G	73	Doug James	Jr
WR	26	Gilvanni Johnson	Fr
TE	81	Eric Kattus	So
C	52	Eric Kempthorn	Jr
G	67	Tom Knoebel	So
OL	51	Mike Krauss	So
RB	38	Ben Logue	Fr
WR	18	Triando Markray	Fr
FB	45	Riley McPhee	So
TB	41	Brian Mercer	So
OL	65	John Mihic	Fr
OT	79	Clay Miller	So
FB	38	Joe Mosketti
OT	71	Mike Odioso	So
QB	14	John Paciorek	So
RB	37	Bob Perryman	Fr
SE	8	Greg Powell	Jr
OT	70	Ron Prusa	Jr
OT	75	Jerry Quaerna	Fr
RB	33	Dan Rice	Fr
TB	46	Lawrence Ricks	Sr
TE	92	Scott Roberts	Sr
RB	20	Rick Rogers	So
TE	82	Paul Schmerge	Fr
C	56	Dave Simon	So
RB	23	Kerry Smith	Jr
QB	16	Steve Smith	Jr
OT	68	Rich Strenger	Sr
C	55	Larry Sweeney	Jr
G	77	Bob Tabachino	So
TB	27	Thomas Wilcher	Fr
TE	84	Mike Wilson	Jr
G	62	Dan Yarano	Sr

Defense

Pos.	#	Name	Class
ILB	33	Jeff Akers	So
ILB	57	Tim Anderson	Jr
DB	3	Marion Brody	Sr
ILB	40	Mike Boren	Jr
SS	12	Keith Bostic	Sr
DT	52	Kevin Brooks	So
DB	15	Jerry Burgei	Sr
DB	12	Fritz Burgess	Jr
DT	63	Winfred Carraway	Sr
DB	30	Brad Cochran	So
DB	10	Jeff Cohen	Sr
DB	21	Evan Cooper	Jr
DT	56	Robert Dana	Jr
DT	90	Vince DeFelice	Jr
DB	17	John Ferens	Jr
DB	14	Tony Gant	Fr
ILB	50	Paul Girgash (C)	Sr
DB	9	Harry Gosier	Jr
LB	62	Joe Gray	So
DT	66	Mike Hammerstein	So
OLB	48	Tom Hassel	Jr
DB	19	Dieter Heren	Fr
ILB	94	Jim Herrmann	Sr
DB	2	Rich Hewlett	Sr
DB	17	Ivan Hicks	Fr
DB	24	Steve Johnson	Fr
DB	23	Lou Kovacs	Sr
OLB	93	Mike Lemirande	Sr
ILB	43	Phil Lewandowski	So
DB	44	John Lott	Sr
OLB	80	Rodney Lyles	Jr
ILB	42	Mike Mallory	So
OLB	92	Jim McConville	Fr
DT	96	Dave Meredith	Jr
ILB	49	Andy Moeller	Fr
OLB	95	Sim Nelson	So
DB	22	Greg Randall	Fr
ILB	45	Mike Reinhold	Fr
MG	61	Nate Rogers	Jr
OLB	89	Carlton Rose	Jr
DT	85	Jim Scarcelli	So
OLB, DT	97	Marty Shimko	Fr
MG	53	Al Sincich	So
OLB	99	Robert Thompson (C)	Sr
OLB	91	Todd Triplett	Sr
OLB	86	Greg Washington	So
DB	29	Derek Woodmore	Fr

Special teams

Pos.	#	Name	Class
PK	19	Bob Bergeron	Jr
P	28	Don Bracken	Jr
PK	6	Ali Haji-Sheikh	Sr
PK	39	Mike Melnyk	Jr
PK	8	Pat Moons	Fr
PK	99	Todd Schlopy	Jr

Head coach

- Bo Schembechler

Coordinators/assistant coaches

- Tirrel Burton
- Lloyd Carr
- Bob Chmiel
- Jerry Hanlon
- Jerry Meter
- Gary Moeller
- Paul Schudel
- Bob Thornbladh
- Elliot Uzelac
- Milan Vooletich

Legend

- (C) Team captain
- (S) Suspended
- (I) Ineligible
- Injured
- Redshirt

Roster

=== Letter winners, offense ===
- Greg Armstrong, fullback, junior, Middletown, Ohio - started 2 games at fullback
- Art Balourdos, center, sophomore, Chicago, Illinois - started 1 game at right offensive guard
- Vincent Bean, split end, junior, Southfield, Michigan - started all 12 games at split end
- Anthony Carter, flanker, senior, Riviera Beach, Florida - started all 12 games at flanker
- Milt Carthens, tight end, junior, Pontiac, Michigan
- J. Nathaniel Davis, tailback, senior, Jamestown, New York
- Rickey Davis, wide receiver, senior, Detroit, Michigan
- Jerry Diorio, offensive guard, junior, Youngstown, Ohio - started 6 games at right offensive guard
- Tom Dixon, center, junior, Fort Wayne, Indiana - started all 12 games at center
- Craig Dunaway, tight end, senior, Pittsburgh, Pennsylvania - started all 12 games at tight end
- Joseph English, Detroit, Michigan
- Eddie Garrett, fullback, freshman, Milwaukee, Wisconsin - started 1 game at fullback
- Tom Garrity, offensive tackle, senior, Grafton, Wisconsin - started 5 games at right offensive tackle
- David Hall, quarterback, junior, Livonia, Michigan
- Mark Hammerstein, offensive line, freshman, Wapakoneta, Ohio
- Mickey Hanlon, wide receiver, senior, Ann Arbor, Michigan
- Gary "Duke" Haymes, fullback, Bellevue, Ohio
- Stefan Humphries, offensive guard, junior, Broward, Florida - started all 12 games at left offensive guard
- Jerald Ingram, fullback, junior, Beaver, Pennsylvania
- Doug James, offensive guard, junior, Louisville, Kentucky - started 6 games at right offensive tackle, 5 games at right offensive guard
- Eric Kattus, tight end, sophomore, Cincinnati, Ohio
- John Lott, defensive back, senior, Masury, Ohio - started 3 games at weak-side cornerback, 1 game at strong-side cornerback
- Brian Mercer, tailback, sophomore, Cincinnati, Ohio
- Clay Miller, offensive tackle, sophomore, Norman, Oklahoma - started 1 game at right offensive tackle
- Joseph S. Mosketti, fullback, Hamilton, Ohio
- Dan Rice, running back, freshman, Roxbury, Massachusetts - started 9 games at fullback
- Lawrence Ricks, tailback, senior, Barberton, Ohio - started all 12 games at tailback
- Scott Roberts, tight end, senior, Miami, Florida
- Rick Rogers, running back, sophomore, Inkster, Michigan
- Kerry Smith, running back, junior, Grand Rapids, Michigan
- Steve Smith, quarterback, junior, Grand Blanc, Michigan - started all 12 games at quarterback
- Rich Strenger, offensive tackle, senior, Grafton, Wisconsin - started all 12 games at left offensive tackle
- Larry Sweeney, center, junior, Alma, Michigan

=== Letter winners, defense ===
- Timothy Anderson, inside linebacker, junior, Ann Arbor, Michigan
- Marion Body, defensive back, senior, Detroit, Michigan - started 5 games at weak-side cornerback
- Mike Boren, inside linebacker, junior, Columbus, Ohio - started all 12 games at inside linebacker
- Keith Bostic, strong safety, senior, Ann Arbor, Michigan - started all 12 games at strong safety
- Kevin Brooks, defensive tackle, sophomore, Detroit, Michigan - started 7 games at defensive tackle
- Jerry Burgei, defensive back, senior, Ottawa, Ohio - started all 12 games (11 at strong-side cornerback, 1 at weak-side cornerback)
- Fritz Burgess, defensive back, junior, Pasadena, California
- Winfred Carraway, defensive tackle, senior, Detroit, Michigan - started all 12 games at defensive tackle
- Brad Cochran, defensive back, sophomore, Royal Oak, Michigan - started 2 games at weak-side cornerback
- Jeff Cohen, defensive back, senior, Farmington Hills, Michigan
- Evan Cooper, defensive back, junior, Miami, Florida - started all 12 games at free safety
- Vincent DeFelice, defensive tackle, junior, Trenton, Michigan
- John Ferens, defensive back, junior, Toledo, Ohio
- Tony Gant, linebacker, freshman, Fremont, Ohio - started 1 game at weak-side cornerback
- Paul Girgash, linebacker, senior, Lakewood, Ohio - started all 12 games at inside linebacker
- Joe Gray, linebacker, sophomore, Detroit, Michigan
- Mike Hammerstein, defensive tackle, sophomore, Wapakoneta, Ohio - started 1 game at defensive tackle
- Thomas J. Hassel, outside linebacker, junior, Cincinnati, Ohio - started 1 game at outside linebacker
- Dieter Heren, defensive back, freshman, Fort Wayne, Indiana
- Jim Herrmann, inside linebacker, senior, Dearborn Heights, Michigan
- Rich Hewlett, defensive back, senior, Plymouth, Michigan
- Louis Kovacs, defensive back, senior, Toledo, Ohio (father of 2012 team co-captain Jordan Kovacs)
- Mike Lemirande, outside linebacker, senior, Grafton, Wisconsin
- John Lott, defensive back, senior, Masury, Ohio - started 3 games at weak-side cornerback, 1 game at strong-side cornerback
- Rodney Lyles, outside linebacker, junior, Miami, Florida
- Mike Mallory, inside linebacker, sophomore, DeKalb, Illinois
- Dave Meredith, defensive tackle, junior, Sterling Heights, Michigan - started 4 games at defensive tackle
- Andy Moeller, inside linebacker, freshman, Ann Arbor, Michigan
- Sim Nelson, outside linebacker, sophomore, Fort Wayne, Indiana
- Nathaniel Rodgers, middle guard, junior, Warren, Ohio
- Carlton Rose, outside linebacker, junior, Ft. Lauderdale, Florida - started 11 games at outside linebacker
- Alan Sincich, middle guard, sophomore, Cleveland, Ohio - started all 12 games at middle guard
- Robert Thompson, outside linebacker, senior, Blue Island, Illinois - started all 12 games at outside linebacker
- Todd Triplett, outside linebacker, senior, Detroit, Michigan

=== Letter winners, special teams ===
- Don Bracken, punter, junior, Thermopolis, Wyoming
- Ali Haji-Sheikh, place-kicker, senior, Arlington, Texas

=== Professional football ===
The following players were claimed in the 1983 NFL draft.

Player	Position	Round	Pick	NFL club
Rich Strenger	Tackle	4	104	Detroit Lions
Keith Bostic	Defensive back	4	109	Houston Oilers
Robert Thompson	Linebacker	5	126	Houston Oilers
Craig Dunaway	Tight end	5	129	Pittsburgh Steelers
Lawrence Ricks	Back	9	252	Dallas Cowboys
Ali Haji-Sheikh	Kicker	10	268	New York Giants
Anthony Carter	Wide receiver	13	364	Miami Dolphins

== Statistics ==
=== Rushing ===
Player	Att	Net Yards	Yds/Att	TD
Lawrence Ricks	266	1388	5.2	8
Steve Smith	83	387	4.7	9
Kerry Smith	45	368	8.2	2
Rick Rogers	65	285	4.4	4
Dan Rice	40	152	3.8	1
Brian Mercer	33	143	4.3	0

=== Passing ===
Player	Att	Comp	Int	Comp %	Yds	Yds/Comp	TD
Steve Smith	227	118	13	52.0	1735	14.7	14
David Hall	38	20	3	52.6	213	10.7	3

=== Receiving ===
Player	Recp	Yds	Yds/Recp	TD
Anthony Carter	43	844	19.6	8
Craig Dunaway	35	488	13.9	3
Vince Bean	19	321	16.9	1
Dan Rice	14	74	5.3	2
Rick Rogers	5	57	11.4	1

=== Scoring ===
Player	TDs	XPM	FGM	Points
Ali Haji-Sheikh	0	41	12	77
Anthony Carter	9	0	0	54
Steve Smith	9	0	0	54
Lawrence Ricks	8	0	0	48
Rick Rogers	5	0	0	30
