= 1982 Wisconsin Badgers football team =

American college football season

1982 Wisconsin Badgers football

Independence Bowl champion

Independence Bowl, W 14–3 vs. Kansas State
- Conference: Big Ten Conference
- Record: 7–5 (5–4 Big Ten)
- Head coach: Dave McClain (5th season)
- Offensive coordinator: Bill Dudley (3rd season)
- Offensive scheme: Pro-style
- Defensive coordinator: Jim Hilles (5th season)
- Base defense: 3–4
- MVP: Randy Wright
- Captains: Tim Krumrie; Matt Vanden Boom; John Williams
- Home stadium: Camp Randall Stadium

1982 Big Ten Conference football standings
	Conf.					Overall
Team	W		L		T	W		L		T
Michigan $	8	–	1	–	0	8	–	4	–	0
No. 12 Ohio State	7	–	1	–	0	9	–	3	–	0
Iowa	6	–	2	–	0	8	–	4	–	0
Illinois	6	–	3	–	0	7	–	5	–	0
Wisconsin	5	–	4	–	0	7	–	5	–	0
Indiana	4	–	5	–	0	5	–	6	–	0
Purdue	3	–	6	–	0	3	–	8	–	0
Northwestern	2	–	7	–	0	3	–	8	–	0
Michigan State	2	–	7	–	0	2	–	9	–	0
Minnesota	1	–	8	–	0	3	–	8	–	0
$ – Conference champion; Rankings from AP Poll

The 1982 Wisconsin Badgers football team represented the University of Wisconsin–Madison in the 1982 Big Ten Conference football season. Led by fifth-year head coach Dave McClain, the Badgers compiled an overall record of 7–5 with a mark of 5–4 in conference play, placing fifth in the Big Ten. Wisconsin was invited to the Independence Bowl, where the Badgers defeated Kansas State. The team played home games at Camp Randall Stadium in Madison, Wisconsin.

The Badgers won the program's first bowl game after losing the previous four. The game was the first live college football game televised by ESPN.

== Schedule ==
Date	Time	Opponent	Site	Result	Attendance	Source
September 11		at No. 12 Michigan	Michigan Stadium; Ann Arbor, MI	L 9–20	104,932	
September 18		No. 14 UCLA*	Camp Randall Stadium; Madison, WI	L 26–51	77,974	
September 25	1:30 p.m.	Toledo*^{†}	Camp Randall Stadium; Madison, WI	W 36–27	73,317	
October 2		at Purdue	Ross–Ade Stadium; West Lafayette, IN	W 35–31	69,132	
October 9		at Ohio State	Ohio Stadium; Columbus, OH	W 6–0	88,234	
October 16		Michigan State	Camp Randall Stadium; Madison, WI	W 24–23	78,187	
October 23		Illinois	Camp Randall Stadium; Madison, WI	L 28–29	78,406	
October 30		Northwestern	Camp Randall Stadium; Madison, WI	W 54–20	64,388	
November 6		Indiana	Camp Randall Stadium; Madison, WI	L 17–20	65,355	
November 13		at Iowa	Kinnick Stadium; Iowa City, IA (rivalry)	L 14–28	58,500	
November 20		Minnesota	Camp Randall Stadium; Madison, WI (rivalry)	W 24–0	59,792	
December 11		vs. Kansas State*	Independence Stadium; Shreveport, LA (Independence Bowl)	W 14–3	49,523	
*Non-conference game; ^{†}Homecoming; Rankings from AP Poll released prior to the game; All times are in Central time

== Game summaries ==
=== Ohio State ===
Team	1	2	3	4	Total
• Wisconsin	6	0	0	0	6
Ohio State	0	0	0	0	0

- Date: October 9
- Location: Ohio Stadium • Columbus, OH

Scoring summary
1	Wisconsin	John Williams 1 yard run (kick blocked)	Wisconsin 6–0

During the opening series, the Ohio State Buckeyes marched the length of the field to the Wisconsin 8 yard line only to watch freshman Rich Spangler miss a 25-yard field goal attempt. Wisconsin responded by driving 80 yards in 14 plays for the only score of the game when Badger tailback John Williams ran the ball from the 1 yard line for the touchdown. Mark Doran's conversion attempt was blocked by Buckeye defensive tackle Jerome Foster. Key plays in the scoring drive included the following: a 15-yard run by Chucky Davis, a 12-yard run by David Keeling, and three passes from quarterback Randy Wright to Tim Stracka, Jeff Nault, and Al Toon, the last pass covering 12 yards to the Ohio State 1. Early in the second quarter, the Buckeyes moved the ball to the Wisconsin 33 only to have Spangler's 50 yard field goal attempt bounce off the crossbar. The Badgers were offside on the play. Spangler's second attempt of 45 yards then sailed wide to the left. Midway through the third quarter, the Badger offense stalled on the Ohio State 13 where Doran missed a 30-yard field goal attempt. The Buckeyes were unable to stop the Badger running backs during the final eight 8 minutes of the game resulting in a Badger shutout.

=== Minnesota ===
Team	1	2	3	4	Total
Minnesota	0	0	0	0	0
• Wisconsin	0	3	14	7	24

- Date: November 20
- Location: Camp Randall Stadium • Madison, WI

Scoring summary
2	WIS	Rodhe 29 yard field goal	Wisconsin 3-0
3	WIS	Wright 1 yard run (Rodhe kick)	Wisconsin 10-0
3	WIS	Nault 28 yard pass from Wright (Rodhe kick)	Wisconsin 17-0
4	WIS	Williams 1 yard run (Rodhe kick)	Wisconsin 24-0

== Roster ==
1982 Wisconsin Badgers football team roster
Players
Coaches
Offense

Pos.	#	Name	Class
TE	85	Dave Arneson	So
OT	75	Kevin Belcher	So
OT	70	Bob Budde	Sr
QB	10	Jess Cole	Jr
RB	23	Chucky Davis	Jr
OT	72	Jeff Dellenbach	So
FB	41	Gary Ellerson	So
RB	24	Larry Emery	Fr
FB	36	Gerald Green	Sr
FB	34	Marck Harrison	So
WR	82	Michael Jones	So
WR	48	David Keeling	So
G	66	Bob Landsee	So
QB	14	John Lonchar	So
WR	20	Thad McFadden (I)	Jr
TE	88	Jeff Nault	Sr
WR	22	Marvin Neal	Sr
TE	86	Bret Pearson	Jr
G	52	Pete Severson	Sr
OT	60	Brian Smith	Sr
WR	42	Tim Stracka	Sr
G	53	Mark Subach	Sr
OT	73	Melvin Terrell	So
WR	87	Al Toon	So
C	58	Ron Versnik	Sr
RB	1	John Williams (C)	Sr
OT	79	Bob Winckler	Sr
QB	12	Randy Wright	Jr

Defense

Pos.	#	Name	Class
CB	26	Brett Armstrong	Jr
CB	17	Richard Baxter	Fr
DT	92	Scott Bergold	So
LB	97	Tom Booker	Jr
LB	32	Kyle Borland	Sr
LB	96	Brad Grabow	So
LB	99	Rick Graf	Fr
S/P	31	David Greenwood	Sr
LB	64	Mike Herrington	Jr
CB	29	Richard Johnson	So
LB	95	Tim Jordan	So
S	13	John Josten	Sr
LB	39	Joe Kelich	Jr
NT	50	Tim Krumrie (C)	Sr
LB	77	Wally Malone	Jr
CB	15	Brian Marrow	Jr
LB	33	James Melka	So
LB	44	Jody O'Donnell	Sr
DT	78	Chris Osswald (injured)	So
LB	76	Mark Shumate	Sr
CB	9	Clint Sims	Sr
DT	60	Darryl Sims	So
CB	21	Mike Stassi	Sr
S	27	Vaughn Thomas	Sr
S	39	Matt Vanden Boom (C)	Sr

Special teams

Pos.	#	Name	Class
K	24	Mark Doran	Jr
K	6	Wendell Gladem	Jr
K	3	Pat Hady	Sr
K	11	Kevin Rohde	Jr
P	5	George Winslow	Fr

Head coach

- Dave McClain

Coordinators/assistant coaches

- Bill Dudley – Offensive coordinator/quarterbacks and receivers
- Jim Hilles – Defensive coordinator/linebackers
- Chuck Heater – Defensive backs
- Arnold Jeter – Defensive line
- Cliff Knox – Running backs
- Mike Nelson – Defensive ends
- Mario Russo – Centers and guards/special teams
- Dick Scesniak – Tackles and tight ends
- Jerry Fishbain – Recruiting coordinator

Legend

- (C) Team captain
- (S) Suspended
- (I) Ineligible
- Injured
- Redshirt

== Team players in the 1983 NFL draft ==
Player	Position	Round	Pick	NFL club
Matt Vandenboom	Defensive Back	5	126	Buffalo Bills
Tim Stracka	Tight End	6	145	Cleveland Browns
Bob Winckler	Tackle	6	166	Washington Redskins
David Greenwood	Defensive Back	8	206	New Orleans Saints
Mark Shumate	Defensive tackle	10	257	Kansas City Chiefs
Tim Krumrie	Defensive tackle	10	276	Cincinnati Bengals
