= 1982 Indiana Hoosiers football team =

American college football season

1982 Indiana Hoosiers football
- Conference: Big Ten Conference
- Record: 5–6 (4–5 Big Ten)
- Head coach: Lee Corso (10th season)
- Defensive coordinator: Ron Corradini (2nd season)
- MVP: Babe Laufenberg
- Captains: Babe Laufenberg; Marc Longshore
- Home stadium: Memorial Stadium

1982 Big Ten Conference football standings
	Conf.					Overall
Team	W		L		T	W		L		T
Michigan $	8	–	1	–	0	8	–	4	–	0
No. 12 Ohio State	7	–	1	–	0	9	–	3	–	0
Iowa	6	–	2	–	0	8	–	4	–	0
Illinois	6	–	3	–	0	7	–	5	–	0
Wisconsin	5	–	4	–	0	7	–	5	–	0
Indiana	4	–	5	–	0	5	–	6	–	0
Purdue	3	–	6	–	0	3	–	8	–	0
Northwestern	2	–	7	–	0	3	–	8	–	0
Michigan State	2	–	7	–	0	2	–	9	–	0
Minnesota	1	–	8	–	0	3	–	8	–	0
$ – Conference champion; Rankings from AP Poll

The 1982 Indiana Hoosiers football team represented the Indiana Hoosiers in the 1982 Big Ten Conference football season. They participated as members of the Big Ten Conference. The Hoosiers played their home games at Memorial Stadium in Bloomington, Indiana. The team was coached by Lee Corso, in his 10th year as head coach of the Hoosiers, before being fired at the end of the season.

== Schedule ==
Date	Opponent	Site	TV	Result	Attendance	Source
September 11	Northwestern	Memorial Stadium; Bloomington, IN		W 30–0	38,595	
September 18	at No. 19 USC*	Los Angeles Memorial Coliseum; Los Angeles, CA		L 7–28	50,724	
September 25	Syracuse*	Memorial Stadium; Bloomington, IN		W 17–10	42,020	
October 2	at Michigan	Michigan Stadium; Ann Arbor, MI		L 10–24	104,385	
October 9	Iowa^{†}	Memorial Stadium; Bloomington, IN	ABC	L 20–24	46,212	
October 16	at Minnesota	Hubert H. Humphrey Metrodome; Minneapolis, MN		W 40–21	61,865	
October 23	Ohio State	Memorial Stadium; Bloomington, IN	ABC	L 25–49	52,040	
October 30	Michigan State	Memorial Stadium; Bloomington, IN (rivalry)		L 14–22	38,571	
November 6	at Wisconsin	Camp Randall Stadium; Madison, WI		W 20–17	65,355	
November 13	Illinois	Memorial Stadium; Bloomington, IN (rivalry)		L 7–48	38,471	
November 20	at Purdue	Ross–Ade Stadium; West Lafayette, IN (Old Oaken Bucket)		W 13–7	69,745	
*Non-conference game; ^{†}Homecoming; Rankings from AP Poll released prior to the game

== Roster ==
- WR Duane Gunn
- QB Babe Laufenberg, Sr.

== 1983 NFL draftees ==
Player	Position	Round	Pick	NFL club
Babe Laufenberg	Quarterback	6	168	Washington Redskins
Jimmy Thomas	Defensive back	10	276	Green Bay Packers
