= 1982 Iowa Hawkeyes football team =

American college football season

1982 Iowa Hawkeyes football

Peach Bowl champion

Peach Bowl, W 28–22 vs. Tennessee
- Conference: Big Ten Conference
- Record: 8–4 (6–2 Big Ten)
- Head coach: Hayden Fry (4th season)
- Offensive coordinator: Bill Snyder (4th season)
- Offensive scheme: Pro-style
- Defensive coordinator: Bill Brashier (4th season)
- Base defense: 5–2
- MVP: Bob Stoops
- Captains: Mark Bortz; Norm Granger; Mike Hufford; Brett Miller; Bob Stoops
- Home stadium: Kinnick Stadium

1982 Big Ten Conference football standings
	Conf.					Overall
Team	W		L		T	W		L		T
Michigan $	8	–	1	–	0	8	–	4	–	0
No. 12 Ohio State	7	–	1	–	0	9	–	3	–	0
Iowa	6	–	2	–	0	8	–	4	–	0
Illinois	6	–	3	–	0	7	–	5	–	0
Wisconsin	5	–	4	–	0	7	–	5	–	0
Indiana	4	–	5	–	0	5	–	6	–	0
Purdue	3	–	6	–	0	3	–	8	–	0
Northwestern	2	–	7	–	0	3	–	8	–	0
Michigan State	2	–	7	–	0	2	–	9	–	0
Minnesota	1	–	8	–	0	3	–	8	–	0
$ – Conference champion; Rankings from AP Poll

The 1982 Iowa Hawkeyes football team was an American football team that represented the University of Iowa as a member of the Big Ten Conference during the 1982 Big Ten football season. In their fourth year under head coach Hayden Fry, the Hawkeyes compiled an 8–4 record (6–2 in Big Ten games), finished in third place in the Big Ten, and were outscored by a total of 208 to 201. They concluded the season in the Peach Bowl with a victory over Tennessee.

Senior defensive back Bob Stoops was selected as the team's most valuable player. Three Iowa players received first-team honors on the 1982 All-Big Ten Conference football team: Stoops; senior defensive tackle Mark Bortz; and senior punter Reggie Roby. Bortz and Roby also received second-team All-America honors. Roby led the nation with an average of 48.1 yards per punt.

The team played its home games at Kinnick Stadium in Iowa City, Iowa.

== Schedule ==
Date	Opponent	Site	TV	Result	Attendance	Source
September 11	at No. 3 Nebraska*	Memorial Stadium; Lincoln, NE	ESPN	L 7–42	76,013	
September 18	Iowa State*	Kinnick Stadium; Iowa City, IA (rivalry)		L 7–19	59,605	
September 25	at Arizona*	Arizona Stadium; Tucson, AZ		W 17–14	41,353	
October 2	Northwestern^{†}	Kinnick Stadium; Iowa City, IA		W 45–7	59,750	
October 9	at Indiana	Memorial Stadium; Bloomington, IN	ABC	W 24–20	46,212	
October 16	Michigan	Kinnick Stadium; Iowa City, IA		L 7–29	59,989	
October 23	at Minnesota	Hubert H. Humphrey Metrodome; Minneapolis, MN (rivalry)		W 21–16	63,872	
October 30	Illinois	Kinnick Stadium; Iowa City, IA	CBS	W 14–13	59,922	
November 6	at Purdue	Ross–Ade Stadium; West Lafayette, IN		L 7–16	67,002	
November 13	Wisconsin	Kinnick Stadium; Iowa City, IA (rivalry)		W 28–14	58,500	
November 20	Michigan State	Spartan Stadium; East Lansing, MI		W 24–18	50,103	
December 31	vs. Tennessee*	Atlanta–Fulton County Stadium; Atlanta, GA (Peach Bowl)	CBS	W 28–22	50,134	
*Non-conference game; ^{†}Homecoming; Rankings from AP Poll released prior to the game

== Game summaries ==
=== At Nebraska ===
Iowa at #3 Nebraska

Team	1	2	3	4	Total
Hawkeyes	0	0	0	7	7
• Cornhuskers	14	14	0	14	42

- Date: September 11, 1982
- Location: Memorial Stadium, Lincoln, Nebraska
- Game start: 1:30 p.m. CDT
- Elapsed time: 2:40
- Game attendance: 76,013
- Referee: McClintock
- TV announcers (ESPN): Jim Simpson and Bud Wilkinson

Scoring summary
Q1	9:03	NEB	Wilkening 3-yard run (Seibel kick)	NEB 7–0
Q1	1:30	NEB	Fryar 41-yard pass from Gill (Seibel kick)	NEB 14–0
Q2	8:50	NEB	Craig 6-yard run (Seibel kick)	NEB 21–0
Q2	0:30	NEB	Prauener fumble recovery in end zone (Seibel kick)	NEB 28–0
Q4	7:53	IOWA	Grogan 5-yard run (Nichol kick)	NEB 28–7
Q4	6:06	NEB	Brown 9-yard pass from Gill (Seibel kick)	NEB 35–7
Q4	5:00	NEB	Smith 80-yard run (Seibel kick)	NEB 42–7

=== Iowa State ===
Iowa State at Iowa

Team	1	2	3	4	Total
• Cyclones	0	3	3	13	19
Hawkeyes	7	0	0	0	7

- Date: September 18
- Location: Kinnick Stadium, Iowa City, IA
- Game start: 1:10 p.m. CDT
- Elapsed time: 2:27
- Game attendance: 59,605
- Game weather: 65 °F (18 °C), Clear and sunny, Wind NW 12 mph (19 km/h)
- Referee: Jerry Hendrickson
- Source: Box Score Archived 2019-08-10 at the Wayback Machine

Scoring summary
Q1	7:18	IOWA	Wancket 26-yard interception return (Nichol kick)	IOWA 7–0
Q2	12:31	ISU	Giffords 26-yard field goal	IOWA 7–3
Q3	5:06	ISU	Giffords 32-yard field goal	IOWA 7–6
Q4	12:49	ISU	Giffords 25-yard field goal	ISU 9–7
Q4	11:06	ISU	Giffords 24-yard field goal	ISU 12–7
Q4	7:33	ISU	Leaks 46-yard pass from Archer (Giffords kick)	ISU 19–7

=== At Arizona ===
Iowa at Arizona

Team	1	2	3	4	Total
• Hawkeyes	0	7	7	3	17
Wildcats	0	14	0	0	14

- Date: September 26
- Location: Arizona Stadium, Tucson, AZ
- Game start: 7:35 p.m.
- Elapsed time: 2:35
- Game attendance: 41,353
- Game weather: 90 °F (32 °C), Partly cloudy, Wind 6 mph (9.7 km/h)

Scoring summary
Q2	11:12	ARIZ	Keel 6-yard pass from Tom Tunnicliffe (Zendejas kick)	ARIZ 7–0
Q2	8:54	IOWA	Love-Jordan 9-yard pass from Chuck Long (Nichol kick)	Tie 7–7
Q2	1:55	ARIZ	Griffin-3 yard run (Zendejas kick)	ARIZ 14–7
Q3	7:34	IOWA	Moritz 14 yard pass from Long (Nichol kick)	Tie 14–14
Q4	2:20	IOWA	Nichol 20 yard field goal	IOWA 17–14

=== Northwestern ===
Northwestern at Iowa

Team	1	2	3	4	Total
Wildcats	0	7	0	0	7
• Hawkeyes	14	14	10	7	45

- Date: October 2
- Location: Kinnick Stadium, Iowa City, IA
- Game attendance: 59,750

Scoring summary
Q1	IOWA	Gill 52-yard run (Nichol kick)	IOWA 7–0
Q1	IOWA	Moritz 36-yard pass from Long (Nichol kick)	IOWA 14–0
Q2	IOWA	Gill 12-yard run (Nichol kick)	IOWA 21–0
Q2	NW	Schwab 1-yard run (Salvino kick)	IOWA 21–7
Q2	IOWA	Phillips 27-yard pass from Long (Nichol kick)	IOWA 28–7
Q3	IOWA	Nichol 49-yard field goal	IOWA 31–7
Q3	IOWA	Granger 11-yard run (Nichol kick)	IOWA 38–7
Q4	IOWA	Robertson 4-yard run (Nichol kick)	IOWA 45–7

=== At Indiana ===
Iowa at Indiana

Team	1	2	3	4	Total
• Hawkeyes	7	7	7	3	24
Hoosiers	3	14	3	0	20

- Date: October 9
- Location: Memorial Stadium, Bloomington, IN
- Game attendance: 46,212
- Television network: CBS

=== Michigan ===
Michigan at Iowa

Team	1	2	3	4	Total
• Wolverines	0	12	3	14	29
Hawkeyes	0	0	0	7	7

- Date: October 16
- Location: Kinnick Stadium, Iowa City, IA
- Game attendance: 59,989

=== At Minnesota ===
Iowa at Minnesota

Team	1	2	3	4	Total
• Hawkeyes	0	7	7	7	21
Golden Gophers	3	3	3	7	16

- Date: October 23
- Location: Hubert H. Humphrey Metrodome, Minneapolis
- Game start: 7:08 p.m. CDT
- Elapsed time: 3:02
- Game attendance: 63,872
- Game weather: Indoors
- Source: Box ScoreArchived 2019-08-10 at the Wayback Machine

Scoring summary
Q1	4:19	MINN	Gallery 25-yard field goal	MINN 3–0
Q2	3:49	IOWA	Chuck Long 2-yard run (Nichol kick)	IOWA 7–3
Q2	0:35	MINN	Gallery 35-yard field goal	IOWA 7–6
Q3	11:44	IOWA	Long 2-yard run (Nichol kick)	IOWA 14–6
Q3	7:28	MINN	Gallery 45-yard field goal	IOWA 14–9
Q4	12:02	IOWA	Eddie Phillips 14-yard run (Nichol kick)	IOWA 21–9
Q4	2:19	MINN	Reid 2-yard run (Gallery kick)	IOWA 21–16

Chuck Long scored on a pair of short touchdown runs and Eddie Phillips rushed for 198 yards and another score.

=== Illinois ===
Illinois at Iowa

Team	1	2	3	4	Total
Fighting Illini	10	0	0	3	13
• Hawkeyes	7	0	7	0	14

- Date: October 30
- Location: Kinnick Stadium, Iowa City, IA
- Game attendance: 59,922
- Television network: CBS

Scoring summary
Q1	ILL	Williams 47-yard pass from Eason (Bass kick)	ILL 7–0
Q1	IOWA	E. Phillips 2-yard run (Nichol kick)	Tied 7–7
Q1	ILL	Bass 52-yard field goal	ILL 10–7
Q3	IOWA	R. Harmon 8-yard pass from Long (Nichol kick)	IOWA 14–10
Q4	ILL	Bass 45-yard field goal	IOWA 14–13

The Hawkeyes earned their first home win over the Fighting Illini since the 1974 season.

=== At Purdue ===
Iowa at Purdue

Team	1	2	3	4	Total
Hawkeyes	0	0	7	0	7
• Boilermakers	3	13	0	0	16

- Date: November 6, 1982
- Location: Ross–Ade Stadium, West Lafayette, Indiana
- Game attendance: 67,002

Scoring summary
1		PUR	Clark 26-yard field goal	PUR 3–0
2		PUR	Clark 24-yard field goal	PUR 6–0
2	6:27	PUR	Clark 29-yard field goal	PUR 9–0
2		PUR	Griffin 71-yard punt return (Clark kick)	PUR 16–0
3		IOWA	O'Brien 5-yard pass from Long (Nichol kick)	PUR 16–7

=== Wisconsin ===
Wisconsin at Iowa

Team	1	2	3	4	Total
Badgers	7	0	0	7	14
• Hawkeyes	7	14	7	0	28

- Date: November 13
- Location: Kinnick Stadium, Iowa City, IA
- Game attendance: 58,500

Scoring summary
Q1	WIS	King 80-yard run (Rohde kick)	WIS 7–0
Q1	IOWA	O. Gill 1-yard run (Nichol kick)	Tied 7–7
Q2	IOWA	O. Gill 44-yard run (Nichol kick)	IOWA 14–7
Q2	IOWA	Long 1-yard run (Nichol kick)	IOWA 21–7
Q3	IOWA	Long 1-yard run (Nichol kick)	IOWA 28–7
Q4	WIS	Bass 45-yard field goal	IOWA 28–14

The Hawkeyes recorded a school-record seven interceptions against the Badgers. Owen Gill ran for 157 yards and two touchdowns, and Chuck Long added two 1-yard touchdown runs.

=== At Michigan State ===
Iowa at Michigan State

Team	1	2	3	4	Total
• Hawkeyes	10	14	0	0	24
Spartans	0	3	0	15	18

- Date: November 20
- Location: Spartan Stadium, East Lansing, MI
- Game start: 1:02 p.m. EST
- Elapsed time: 3:04
- Game attendance: 50,103
- Game weather: 57 °F (14 °C), Breezy and warm, chance of rain, Wind SSE 15 mph (24 km/h)
- Referee: John Nealon

Scoring summary
Q1	7:19	IOWA	Nichol 43-yard field goal	IOWA 3–0
Q1	3:59	IOWA	Owen Gill 10-yard run (Nichol kick)	IOWA 10–0
Q2	11:49	IOWA	Owen Gill 5-yard run (Nichol kick)	IOWA 17–0
Q2	6:37	MSU	Mojsiejenko 39-yard field goal	IOWA 17–3
Q2	1:04	IOWA	Owen Gill 11-yard run (Nichol kick)	IOWA 24–3
Q4	7:27	MSU	Ellis 1-yard run (Mojsiejenko kick)	IOWA 24–10
Q4	1:23	MSU	Ellis 2-yard run (Schario run)	IOWA 24–18

This game gained attention when Iowa safety Ron Hawley knocked over the wooden goalposts while defending a play during the second quarter. The metal goalposts had been replaced with wooden ones before the game as Michigan State officials feared they would be torn down by students at the game's end. Play was delayed for several minutes and remained broken when Michigan State was about to attempt a field goal, resulting in the grounds crew holding the posts manually during the kick.

=== Vs. Tennessee (Peach Bowl) ===
Iowa vs. Tennessee

Team	1	2	3	4	Total
• Hawkeyes	0	21	7	0	28
Volunteers	7	0	12	3	22

- Date: December 31
- Location: Atlanta–Fulton County Stadium, Atlanta, GA
- Game attendance: 50,134
- Game weather: 41 °F (5 °C), Cloudy and cool, Wind NW 8 mph (13 km/h)
- Referee: James Garvey
- TV announcers (CBS): Verne Lundquist and Steve Davis

Scoring summary
Q1	0:12	TENN	Alan Cockrell 6-yard run (Fuad Reveiz kick)	TENN 7–0
Q2	12:59	IOWA	Moritz 57-yard pass from Long (Nichol kick)	Tied 7–7
Q2	6:58	IOWA	Harmon 18-yard pass from Long (Nichol kick)	IOWA 14–7
Q2	2:07	IOWA	Harmon 8-yard pass from Long (Nichol kick)	IOWA 21–7
Q3	11:16	TENN	Coleman 10-yard run (kick failed)	IOWA 21–13
Q3	8:29	IOWA	Phillips 2-yard run (Nichol kick)	IOWA 28–13
Q3	5:34	TENN	Willie Gault 19-yard pass from Cockrell (pass failed)	IOWA 28–19
Q4	10:05	TENN	Reveiz 27-yard field goal	IOWA 28–22

Iowa earned its first bowl victory since 1959.

== Roster ==
1982 Iowa Hawkeyes football team roster
Players
Coaches
Offense

Pos.	#	Name	Class
OT	78	John Alt	Jr
OL	69	Mike Bennett	Fr
WR	27	Bill Broghamer	Jr
RB	33	Owen Gill	So
FB	26	Norm Granger (C)	Jr
QB		Tom Grogan	Jr
OT		Mike Haight	Fr
G	68	Tim Hanna	Jr
WR	40	Bill Happel	Fr
RB	31	Ronnie Harmon	Fr
WR	87	Scott Helverson	Fr
C	53	Joel Hilgenberg	Jr
TE	86	Mike Hufford (C)	Jr
G	65	Tom Humphrey	Fr
OT	55	Joe Levelis	Jr
QB	16	Chuck Long	Fr
OT	79	Brett Miller (C)	Sr
WR	5	Dave Moritz	Jr
TE	88	Lon Olejniczak	Jr
RB	22	Eddie Phillips	Jr
G	66	Jon Roehlk	Jr

Defense

Pos.	#	Name	Class
DL	63	Mark Bortz (C)	Sr
LB	47	Zane Corbin	So
CB	29	Nate Creer	Fr
LB	34	Jonathan Hayes	Fr
DL	91	Michael Hooks	So
DL	64	Paul Hufford	So
DB	14	Keith Hunter	So
DT	77	George Little	So
DE	92	Tony Wancket	So
DB	21	Devon Mitchell	Fr
DB	45	Jay Norvell	Fr
DL	50	Hap Peterson	Fr
LB	36	Larry Station	Fr
LB	32	James Erb	Sr
DB	41	Bob Stoops (C)	Sr
DB		Mike Stoops	So
DE		Dave Strobel	So
DL	51	Bill Weires	Fr

Special teams

Pos.	#	Name	Class
K	3	Tom Nichol	So
P	7	Reggie Roby	Sr

Head coach

- Hayden Fry

Coordinators/assistant coaches

- Bill Snyder – Offensive Coordinator/Quarterbacks
- Bill Brashier – Defensive Coordinator
- Kirk Ferentz – Offensive line
- Carl Jackson – Running backs
- Del Miller – Offensive assistant
- Dan McCarney – Defensive line
- Barry Alvarez – Linebackers
- Don Patterson – Defensive Backs
- Bernie Wyatt – Defensive Ends/Recruiting Coordinator
- Bill Dervich – Strength and Conditioning
- Bruce Kittle – Graduate assistant

Legend

- (C) Team captain
- (S) Suspended
- (I) Ineligible
- Injured
- Redshirt

== Statistical achievements ==
The 1982 Hawkeyes tallied 2,101 rushing yards and 1,873 passing yards. On defense, they gave up 1,441 rushing yards and 2,572 passing yards. The Iowa defense intercepted seven passes against Wisconsin. The figure remains an Iowa single-season record.

The team's individual statistical leaders included:

- Sophomore quarterback Chuck Long completed 148 of 227 passes for 1,678 yards. Long passed for a season-high 304 yards and three touchdowns in the Peach Bowl.
- Eddie Phillips was the leading rusher with 806 yards on 166 carries. Phillips tallied a season-high 198 rushing yards against Minnesota on October 23, 1982.
- Dave Moritz was the leading receiver with 41 catches for 605 yards. He tallied a season-high eight receptions for 168 yards against Tennessee in the Peach Bowl.
- Kicker Tom Nichol was the leading scorer with 43 points on four field goals and 31 extra points.

Home attendance at Kinnick Stadium totaled 297,766, an average of 59,553.

== Awards and honors ==
Senior defensive back Bob Stoops, a four-year starter from Youngstown, Ohio, and later a Hall of Fame coach at Oklahoma, tallied four interceptions and 65 tackles (24 solo, 41 assists), and was selected as the team's most valuable player. At the award banquet, Stoops said: "It's really been an honor to play at Iowa. It's been such an honor that I don't even feel like I should be receiving an award."

Punter Reggie Roby and offensive tackle Mark Bortz received second-team All-America honors from the UPI. Roby led nation with a 48.1-yard punt average.

Three Iowa players received first-team honors on the 1982 All-Big Ten Conference football team: Stoops (AP-1); senior defensive tackle Mark Bortz (AP-1, UPI-1); and senior punter Reggie Roby (AP-1, UPI-1).

The team had five co-captains: Stoops, Bortz, Norm Granger, Mike Hufford, and Brett Miller.

== 1983 NFL draft ==
Player	Position	Round	Pick	NFL club
Brett Miller	Tackle	5	129	Atlanta Falcons
Reggie Roby	Punter	6	167	Miami Dolphins
Mark Bortz	Guard	8	219	Chicago Bears
