= 1982 Northwestern Wildcats football team =

American college football season

1982 Northwestern Wildcats football
- Conference: Big Ten Conference
- Record: 3–8 (2–7 Big Ten)
- Head coach: Dennis Green (2nd season)
- Captains: Chris Hinton; Rich Raffin
- Home stadium: Dyche Stadium

1982 Big Ten Conference football standings
	Conf.					Overall
Team	W		L		T	W		L		T
Michigan $	8	–	1	–	0	8	–	4	–	0
No. 12 Ohio State	7	–	1	–	0	9	–	3	–	0
Iowa	6	–	2	–	0	8	–	4	–	0
Illinois	6	–	3	–	0	7	–	5	–	0
Wisconsin	5	–	4	–	0	7	–	5	–	0
Indiana	4	–	5	–	0	5	–	6	–	0
Purdue	3	–	6	–	0	3	–	8	–	0
Northwestern	2	–	7	–	0	3	–	8	–	0
Michigan State	2	–	7	–	0	2	–	9	–	0
Minnesota	1	–	8	–	0	3	–	8	–	0
$ – Conference champion; Rankings from AP Poll

The 1982 Northwestern Wildcats team represented Northwestern University during the 1982 Big Ten Conference football season. In their second year under head coach Dennis Green, the Wildcats compiled a 3–8 record (2–7 against Big Ten Conference opponents) and finished in a tie for eighth place in the Big Ten Conference.

On September 25, Northwestern defeated Northern Illinois, 31–6, to end the Wildcats' 34-game losing streak, which remains the longest losing streak in NCAA Division I Football Bowl Subdivision (FBS) history.

Green was awarded Big Ten Coach of the Year for the 1982 season. While the team's record is still the worst of any winner's team, the three wins equaled the team's total over the previous six seasons.

The team's offensive leaders were quarterback Sandy Schwab with 2,735 passing yards, Ricky Edwards with 688 rushing yards, and Jon Harvey with 807 receiving yards. Schwab ranked among the leading quarterbacks in major-college football with 504 total plays (4th), 20 passing interceptions (4th), 234 pass completions (5th), 416 pass attempts (4th), 2,735 passing yards (9th), and 248.6 yards gained per game (9th).

Offensive tackle Chris Hinton received first-team All-Big Ten honors from both the Associated Press and the United Press International.

== Schedule ==
Date	Time	Opponent	Site	Result	Attendance	Source
September 4		at Illinois	Memorial Stadium; Champaign, IL (rivalry)	L 13–49	67,036	
September 11		at Indiana	Memorial Stadium; Bloomington, IN	L 0–30	38,595	
September 18	1:01 p.m.	Miami (OH)*	Dyche Stadium; Evanston, IL	L 13–27	22,536	
September 25	1:00 p.m.	Northern Illinois*	Dyche Stadium; Evanston, IL	W 31–6	22,078	
October 2		at Iowa	Kinnick Stadium; Iowa City, IA	L 7–45	59,750	
October 9		Minnesota	Dyche Stadium; Evanston, IL	W 31–21	20,875	
October 16		at Purdue	Ross–Ade Stadium; West Lafayette, IN	L 21–34	67,659	
October 23		Michigan	Dyche Stadium; Evanston, IL (rivalry)	L 14–49	34,121	
October 30		at Wisconsin	Camp Randall Stadium; Madison, WI	L 20–54	64,388	
November 6		at Michigan State	Spartan Stadium; East Lansing, MI	W 28–24	53,513	
November 13		Ohio State	Dyche Stadium; Evanston, IL	L 28–40	30,074	
*Non-conference game; All times are in Central time

== Roster ==
1982 Northwestern Wildcats football team roster
Players
Coaches
Offense

Pos.	#	Name	Class
OT	75	Chris Hinton	Sr
QB	17	Sandy Schwab	Fr
WR	6	Steve Tasker	Jr
QB	11	Mike Wall	So

Defense

Pos.	#	Name	Class
DL	54	Tom Flaherty	Fr
LB	35	Mike Guendling	Jr
LB	26	Alex Moyer	So

Special teams

Pos.	#	Name	Class
P	4	John Kidd	Jr

Head coach

- Dennis Green

Coordinators/assistant coaches

Legend

- (C) Team captain
- (S) Suspended
- (I) Ineligible
- Injured
- Redshirt
