= 1982 Ohio State Buckeyes football team =

American college football season

1982 Ohio State Buckeyes football

Holiday Bowl champion

Holiday Bowl, W 47–17 vs. BYU
- Conference: Big Ten Conference

Ranking
- Coaches: No. 12
- AP: No. 12
- Record: 9–3 (7–1 Big Ten)
- Head coach: Earle Bruce (4th season)
- Offensive coordinator: Glen Mason (3rd season)
- Defensive coordinator: Bob Tucker (1st season)
- MVP: Tim Spencer
- Captains: Glen Cobb; Jerome Foster; Joe Lukens; Marcus Marek; Tim Spencer; Gary Williams; Pepe Gomez
- Home stadium: Ohio Stadium

1982 Big Ten Conference football standings
	Conf.					Overall
Team	W		L		T	W		L		T
Michigan $	8	–	1	–	0	8	–	4	–	0
No. 12 Ohio State	7	–	1	–	0	9	–	3	–	0
Iowa	6	–	2	–	0	8	–	4	–	0
Illinois	6	–	3	–	0	7	–	5	–	0
Wisconsin	5	–	4	–	0	7	–	5	–	0
Indiana	4	–	5	–	0	5	–	6	–	0
Purdue	3	–	6	–	0	3	–	8	–	0
Northwestern	2	–	7	–	0	3	–	8	–	0
Michigan State	2	–	7	–	0	2	–	9	–	0
Minnesota	1	–	8	–	0	3	–	8	–	0
$ – Conference champion; Rankings from AP Poll

The 1982 Ohio State Buckeyes football team was an American football team that represented the Ohio State University as a member of the Big Ten Conference during the 1982 Big Ten season. In their fourth year under head coach Earle Bruce, the Buckeyes compiled a 9–3 record (7–1 in conference games), finished in second place the Big Ten, and outscored opponents by a total of 301 to 191. They lost three consecutive games to Stanford, Florida State, and Wisconsin to open the season with a 2–3 record, then won seven consecutive games including victories over No. 15 Illinois, No. 13 Michigan, and unranked BYU in the 1982 Holiday Bowl. They were ranked No. 12 in the final AP poll.

The Buckeyes gained an average of 226.5 rushing yards and 159.8 passing yards per game. On defense, they held opponents to 125.8 rushing yards and 207.5 passing yards per game. The team's statistical leaders included quarterback Mike Tomczak (1,470 passing yards, 50.3% completion percentage), running back Tim Spencer (1,371 rushing yards, 5.4 yards per carry, 13 touchdowns), and wide receiver Gary Williams (35 receptions for 626 yards). Linebacker Marcus Marek was a consensus first-team All-American.

The team played its home games at Ohio Stadium in Columbus, Ohio.

== Schedule ==
Date	Time	Opponent	Rank	Site	TV	Result	Attendance	Source
September 11	1:30 p.m.	Baylor*	No. 14	Ohio Stadium; Columbus, OH		W 21–14	88,622	
September 18	1:00 p.m.	at Michigan State	No. 12	Spartan Stadium; East Lansing, MI		W 31–10	73,483	
September 25	12:37 p.m.	Stanford*	No. 13	Ohio Stadium; Columbus, OH	ABC	L 20–23	89,436	
October 2	1:30 p.m.	Florida State*		Ohio Stadium; Columbus, OH		L 17–34	89,491	
October 9	1:30 p.m.	Wisconsin		Ohio Stadium; Columbus, OH		L 0–6	88,344	
October 16	2:00 p.m.	at No. 15 Illinois		Memorial Stadium; Champaign, IL (Illibuck)		W 26–21	73,488	
October 23	3:30 p.m.	at Indiana		Memorial Stadium; Bloomington, IN	ABC	W 49–25	52,040	
October 30	1:30 p.m.	Purdue		Ohio Stadium; Columbus, OH		W 38–6	89,341	
November 6	1:30 p.m.	Minnesota		Ohio Stadium; Columbus, OH		W 35–10	87,666	
November 13	2:00 p.m.	at Northwestern		Dyche Stadium; Evanston, IL		W 40–28	30,074	
November 20	12:30 p.m.	No. 13 Michigan		Ohio Stadium; Columbus, OH (rivalry)	CBS	W 24–14	90,252	
December 17	9:00 p.m.	vs. BYU*	No. 17	Jack Murphy Stadium; San Diego, CA (Holiday Bowl)	ESPN	W 47–17	52,533	
*Non-conference game; Rankings from AP Poll released prior to the game; All times are in Eastern time

== Game summaries ==
=== Baylor ===
Team	1	2	3	4	Total
Baylor	0	7	7	0	14
• Ohio State	7	7	0	7	21

- Date: September 11
- Location: Ohio Stadium • Columbus, Ohio

=== Michigan State ===
Team	1	2	3	4	Total
• Ohio State	3	7	0	21	31
Michigan St	7	0	3	0	10

- Date: September 18
- Location: Spartan Stadium • East Lansing, Michigan

=== Stanford ===
Team	1	2	3	4	Total
• Stanford	0	0	13	10	23
Ohio State	3	10	0	7	20

- Date: September 25
- Location: Ohio Stadium • Columbus, Ohio

Scoring summary
1	4:22	OSU	Spangler 31-yard field goal	OSU 3–0
2	14:58	OSU	Broadnax 1-yard run (Spangler kick)	OSU 10–0
2	0:13	OSU	Spangler 24-yard field goal	OSU 13–0
3	10:56	STAN	Harmon 23-yard field goal	OSU 13–3
3	6:26	STAN	Harmon 24-yard field goal	OSU 13–6
3	3:30	STAN	Dotterer 11-yard pass from John Elway (Harmon kick)	Tied 13–13
4	8:47	OSU	Spencer 2-yard run (Spangler kick)	OSU 20–13
4	4:15	STAN	Harmon 47-yard field goal	OSU 20–16
4	0:34	STAN	Harry 18-yard pass from Elway (Harmon kick)	Stanford 23–20

=== Florida State ===
Team	1	2	3	4	Total
• Florida St	7	14	0	13	34
Ohio State	10	7	0	0	17

- Date: October 2
- Location: Ohio Stadium • Columbus, Ohio
- Game attendance: 89,491

=== Wisconsin ===
Team	1	2	3	4	Total
• Wisconsin	6	0	0	0	6
Ohio State	0	0	0	0	0

- Date: October 9
- Location: Ohio Stadium • Columbus, Ohio

Scoring summary
1	Wisconsin	John Williams 1 yard run (kick blocked)	Wisconsin 6–0

=== Illinois ===
Team	1	2	3	4	Total
• Ohio St	7	7	7	5	26
Illinois	0	7	0	14	21

- Date: October 16
- Location: Memorial Stadium
- Game attendance: 73,488
- Game weather: Clear; 53 °F (12 °C); wind 12–15 mph (19–24 km/h) NW

=== Indiana ===
Team	1	2	3	4	Total
• Ohio St	14	14	7	14	49
Indiana	0	13	6	6	25

- Date: October 23
- Location: Memorial Stadium

=== Purdue ===
Team	1	2	3	4	Total
Purdue	3	3	0	0	6
• Ohio State	14	3	14	7	38

- Date: October 30
- Location: Ohio Stadium • Columbus, Ohio

Scoring summary
1	OSU	Frank 12 yard pass from Tomczak (Spangler kick)	OSU 7-0
1	PUR	Clark 43 yard field goal	OSU 7-3
1	OSU	Anderson 33 yard pass from Tomczak (Spangler kick)	OSU 14-3
2	OSU	Spangler 47 yard field goal	OSU 17-3
2	PUR	Clark 36 yard field goal	OSU 17-6
3	OSU	Gayle 13 yard run (Spangler kick)	OSU 24-6
3	OSU	Spencer 41 yard run (Spangler kick)	OSU 31-6
4	OSU	Spencer 2 yard run (Spangler kick)	OSU 38-6

=== Minnesota ===
Team	1	2	3	4	Total
Minnesota	0	3	7	0	10
• Ohio St	7	14	14	0	35

- Date: November 6
- Location: Ohio Stadium
- Game start: 1:30 EST
- Elapsed time: 2:50
- Game attendance: 87,666
- Game weather: Sunny; 42 °F (6 °C); wind 10–20 mph (16–32 km/h) SW
- Referee: John Nealon

=== Northwestern ===
Team	1	2	3	4	Total
• Ohio St	13	15	0	12	40
Northwestern	7	7	7	7	28

- Date: November 13
- Location: Dyche Stadium

=== Michigan ===
Michigan Wolverines at Ohio State Buckeyes

Quarter	1	2	3	4	Total
Michigan	7	0	7	0	14
Ohio St	0	14	0	10	24

at Ohio Stadium, Columbus, Ohio

- Date: November 20, 1982
- Game time: 12:30 p.m. EST
- Game weather: Rain, 65 °F (18 °C)
- Game attendance: 90,252
- Referee: Tom Quinn
- TV announcers (CBS): Gary Bender and Pat Haden
- Box Score

Game information

First quarter

- MICH – Lawrence Ricks 1-yard run (Ali Haji-Sheikh kick), 2:11. Michigan 7–0. Drive: 11 plays, 52 yards, 5:43.

Second quarter

- OSU – Vaughn Broadnax 6-yard run (Rick Spangler kick), 6:53. Tie 7–7. Drive: 7 plays, 29 yards, 3:14.
- OSU – Tim Spencer 2-yard run (Rick Spangler kick), 0:33. Ohio St 14–7. Drive: 11 plays, 75 yards, 1:44.

Third quarter

- MICH – Steve Smith 4-yard run (Ali Haji-Sheikh kick), 2:38. Tie 14–14. Drive: 15 plays, 63 yards, 7:03.

Fourth quarter

- OSU – Tim Spencer 1-yard run (Rick Spangler kick), 6:27. Ohio St 21–14. Drive: 3 plays, 14 yards, 1:13.
- OSU – Rick Spangler 33-yard field goal, 3:27. Ohio St 24–14. Drive: 4 plays, 3 yards, 2:44.

Top passers

- MICH – Steve Smith – 12/28, 127 yards, 3 INT
- OSU – Mike Tomczak – 10/17, 159 yards

Top rushers

- MICH – Lawrence Ricks – 27 rushes, 110 yards, TD
- OSU – Tim Spencer – 27 rushes, 124 yards, 2 TD

Top receivers

- MICH – Anthony Carter – 7 receptions, 78 yards
- OSU – Gary Williams – 4 receptions, 76 yards

=== Holiday Bowl ===
1982 Holiday Bowl

Team	1	2	3	4	Total
• Ohio State	3	14	17	13	47
BYU	0	10	0	7	17

- Date: December 17
- Location: Jack Murphy Stadium, San Diego
- Game attendance: 52,533
- TV announcers (ESPN): Fred White & Irv Brown

Scoring summary
1	6:54	OSU	Rich Spangler 4 yard field goal	OSU 3-0
2	13:56	BYU	Neil Balholm 7 yard pass from Steve Young (Gunther kick)	BYU 7–3
2	12:55	OSU	Tim Spencer (American football) 61 yard run (Spangler kick)	OSU 10–7
2	11:14	OSU	Mike Tomczak 3 yard run (Spangler kick)	OSU 17–7
2	1:43	BYU	Kurt Gunther 39 yard field goal	OSU 17–10
3	8:57	OSU	Vaughn Broadnax 1 yard run (Spangler kick)	OSU 24–10
3	7:58	OSU	Tim Spencer 18 yard run (Spangler kick)	OSU 31–10
3	6:00	OSU	Rich Spangler 37 yard field goal	OSU 34–10
4	12:58	OSU	Jimmie Gayle 1 yard run (Spangler kick)	OSU 41–10
4	7:09	BYU	Gordon Hudson 13 yard pass from Steve Young (Gunther kick)	OSU 41–17
4	2:05	OSU	Jimmie Gayle 5 yard run (kick failed)	OSU 47–17

== Personnel ==
=== Roster ===
1982 Ohio State Buckeyes football team roster
Players
Coaches
Offense

Pos.	#	Name	Class
FB	38	Vaughn Broadnax	Jr
FB	41	Keith Byars	Fr
TE	89	John Frank	Jr
OL	64	Jim Lachey	So
RB	46	Tim Spencer	Sr
QB	15	Mike Tomczak	So
WR		Gary Williams

Defense

Pos.	#	Name	Class
DB	2	Shaun Gayle	Jr
DB		Garcia Lane

Special teams

Pos.	#	Name	Class
K		Rick Spangler	Fr

Head coach

- Earle Bruce

Coordinators/assistant coaches

- Dom Capers – defensive backs
- Randy Hart – defensive line
- Glen Mason – offensive coordinator
- Bill Myles – offensive line
- Fred Pagac – linebackers
- Wayne Stanley – running backs
- Bob Tucker – defensive coordinator
- Fred Zechman – quarterbacks/receivers

Legend

- (C) Team captain
- (S) Suspended
- (I) Ineligible
- Injured
- Redshirt

Roster

=== Depth chart ===
Defense

FS
Kelvin Bell
⋅

ROLB	ILB	ILB	LOLB
Curt Curtis	Glen Cobb	Marcus Marek	Rowland Tatum
Byron Lee	Larry Kolic	⋅	Orlando Lowry

ROV
Doug Hill
Lamar Kuechler

CB
Shaun Gayle
Doyle Lewis

DE	NT	DE
Chris Riehm	Spencer Nelms	Jerome Foster
Dave Morrill	Kirk Lowdermilk	Dave Crecilius

CB
Garcia Lane
⋅

Offense

SE
Gary Williams
Thad Jemison

LT	LG	C	RG	RT
William Roberts	Scott Zalenski	Craig Pack	Joe Lukens	Jim Carson
Mark Krerowicz	Jim Lachey	Joe Dooley	⋅	Joe Smith

TE
John Frank
Brad Dwelle

FL
Cedric Anderson
Ray Myers

QB
Mike Tomczak
Brent Offenbecher

FB
Vaughn Broadnax
Keith Byars

Special teams
PK Rich Spangler
P Karl Edwards

RB
Tim Spencer
Jimmy Gayle

== 1983 NFL draftees ==
Player	Round	Pick	Position	NFL club
Jerome Foster	5	139	Defensive end	Houston Oilers
Gary Williams	11	304	Wide receiver	Cincinnati Bengals
Joe Lukens	11	306	Guard	Miami Dolphins
Tim Spencer	11	307	Running back	San Diego Chargers
