= 1982 Minnesota Golden Gophers football team =

American college football season

1982 Minnesota Golden Gophers football
- Conference: Big Ten Conference
- Record: 3–8 (1–8 Big Ten)
- Head coach: Joe Salem (4th season)
- MVP: Mike Hohensee
- Captain: Ed Olson
- Home stadium: Hubert H. Humphrey Metrodome

1982 Big Ten Conference football standings
	Conf.					Overall
Team	W		L		T	W		L		T
Michigan $	8	–	1	–	0	8	–	4	–	0
No. 12 Ohio State	7	–	1	–	0	9	–	3	–	0
Iowa	6	–	2	–	0	8	–	4	–	0
Illinois	6	–	3	–	0	7	–	5	–	0
Wisconsin	5	–	4	–	0	7	–	5	–	0
Indiana	4	–	5	–	0	5	–	6	–	0
Purdue	3	–	6	–	0	3	–	8	–	0
Northwestern	2	–	7	–	0	3	–	8	–	0
Michigan State	2	–	7	–	0	2	–	9	–	0
Minnesota	1	–	8	–	0	3	–	8	–	0
$ – Conference champion; Rankings from AP Poll

The 1982 Minnesota Golden Gophers football team represented the University of Minnesota in the 1982 Big Ten Conference football season. In their fourth year under head coach Joe Salem, the Golden Gophers compiled a 3–8 record and were outscored by their opponents by a combined total of 295 to 287. It was the first season in the H.H.H. Metrodome.

Quarterback Mike Hohensee received the team's Most Valuable Player award, while offensive lineman Randy Rasmussen was named offensive MVP, and defensive end Karl Mecklenburg was named the defensive MVP. Rasmussen, offensive lineman Bill Humphries, and Mecklenburg were named All-Big Ten second team. Mecklenburg, defensive lineman Fred Orgas and fullback Bob Stroup were named Academic All-Big Ten.

Total attendance for the season was 413,200, which averaged to 59,028. The season high for attendance was against Iowa.

== Schedule ==
Date	Time	Opponent	Rank	Site	TV	Result	Attendance	Source
September 11	7:05 p.m.	Ohio*		Hubert H. Humphrey Metrodome; Minneapolis, MN		W 57–3	56,168	
September 18		at Purdue		Ross–Ade Stadium; West Lafayette, IN	CBS	W 36–10	63,247	
September 25		Washington State*		Hubert H. Humphrey Metrodome; Minneapolis, MN		W 41–11	50,653	
October 2		Illinois	No. 19	Hubert H. Humphrey Metrodome; Minneapolis, MN	CBS	L 24–42	63,684	
October 9		at Northwestern		Dyche Stadium; Evanston, IL		L 21–31	20,875	
October 16		Indiana^{†}		Hubert H. Humphrey Metrodome; Minneapolis, MN		L 21–40	61,865	
October 23		Iowa		Hubert H. Humphrey Metrodome; Minneapolis, MN (rivalry)		L 16–21	63,872	
October 30		at No. 20 Michigan		Michigan Stadium; Ann Arbor, MI (Little Brown Jug)		L 14–52	105,619	
November 6		at Ohio State		Ohio Stadium; Columbus, OH		L 10–35	87,666	
November 13		Michigan State		Hubert H. Humphrey Metrodome; Minneapolis, MN		L 7–26	57,146	
November 20		at Wisconsin		Camp Randall Stadium; Madison, WI (rivalry)		L 0–24	59,792	
*Non-conference game; ^{†}Homecoming; Rankings from AP Poll released prior to the game; All times are in Central time

== Game summaries ==
=== Iowa ===
Iowa at Minnesota

Team	1	2	3	4	Total
• Hawkeyes	0	7	7	7	21
Golden Gophers	3	3	3	7	16

- Date: October 23
- Location: Hubert H. Humphrey Metrodome, Minneapolis
- Game start: 7:08 p.m. CDT
- Elapsed time: 3:02
- Game attendance: 63,872
- Game weather: Indoors

Scoring summary
1	4:19	MINN	Gallery 25-yard field goal	MINN 3–0
2	3:49	IOWA	Chuck Long 2-yard run (Nichol kick)	IOWA 7–3
2	0:35	MINN	Gallery 35-yard field goal	IOWA 7–6
3	11:44	IOWA	Long 2-yard run (Nichol kick)	IOWA 14–6
3	7:28	MINN	Gallery 45-yard field goal	IOWA 14–9
4	12:02	IOWA	Eddie Phillips 14-yard run (Nichol kick)	IOWA 21–9
4	2:19	MINN	Reid 2-yard run (Gallery kick)	IOWA 21–16

=== At Michigan ===
Minnesota at Michigan

Team	1	2	3	4	Total
Golden Gophers	0	7	0	7	14
• Wolverines	7	24	14	7	52

- Date: October 30
- Location: Michigan Stadium, Ann Arbor, Michigan
- Game attendance: 105,619

Scoring summary
1		MICH	Carter 29-yard pass from S. Smith (Haji-Sheikh kick)	Mich 7–0
2		MICH	S. Smith 6-yard run (Haji-Sheikh kick)	Mich 14–0
2		MICH	Rice 1-yard pass from S. Smith (Haji-Sheikh kick)	Mich 21–0
2	4:14	MICH	Rogers 10-yard run (Haji-Sheikh kick)	Mich 28–0
2	1:17	MINN	McMullen 13-yard pass from Hohensee (Gallery kick)	Mich 28–7
2		MICH	Haji-Sheikh 24-yard field goal	Mich 31–7
3	9:42	MICH	Dunaway 42-yard pass from S. Smith (Haji-Sheikh kick)	Mich 38–7
3		MICH	K. Smith 6-yard run (Haji-Sheikh kick)	Mich 45–7
4		MINN	Jacobs 3-yard run (Gallery kick)	Mich 45–14
4	2:40	MICH	Greg Armstrong 17-yard pass from Dave Hall (Haji-Sheikh kick)	Mich 52–14

=== At Ohio State ===
Minnesota at Ohio State

Team	1	2	3	4	Total
Golden Gophers	0	3	7	0	10
• Buckeyes	7	14	14	0	35

- Date: November 6
- Location: Ohio Stadium
- Game start: 2:30 CST
- Elapsed time: 2:50
- Game attendance: 87,666
- Game weather: Sunny; 42 °F (6 °C); wind 10–20 mph (16–32 km/h) SW
- Referee: John Nealon

=== At Wisconsin ===
Minnesota at Wisconsin

Team	1	2	3	4	Total
Golden Gophers	0	0	0	0	0
• Badgers	0	3	14	7	24

- Date: November 20
- Location: Camp Randall Stadium • Madison, WI

Scoring summary
2	WIS	Rodhe 29 yard field goal	Wisconsin 3-0
3	WIS	Wright 1 yard run (Rodhe kick)	Wisconsin 10-0
3	WIS	Nault 28 yard pass from Wright (Rodhe kick)	Wisconsin 17-0
4	WIS	Williams 1 yard run (Rodhe kick)	Wisconsin 24-0

== Roster ==
1982 Minnesota Golden Gophers football team roster
Players
Coaches
Offense

Pos.	#	Name	Class
QB	9	Mike Hohensee	Sr
C	53	Randy Rasmussen	Sr
QB		Tim Salem	Jr

Defense

Pos.	#	Name	Class

Special teams

Pos.	#	Name	Class

Head coach

- Joe Salem

Coordinators/assistant coaches

- Mike Martz

Legend

- (C) Team captain
- (S) Suspended
- (I) Ineligible
- Injured
- Redshirt

Roster
