= 1982 Michigan State Spartans football team =

American college football season

1982 Michigan State Spartans football
- Conference: Big Ten Conference
- Record: 2–9 (2–7 Big Ten)
- Head coach: Muddy Waters (3rd season)
- MVP: James Neely
- Captains: Carl Banks; John Leister
- Home stadium: Spartan Stadium

1982 Big Ten Conference football standings
| | Conf. | | | | | Overall |
| Team | W | | L | | T | W | | L | | T |
|---|---|---|---|---|---|---|---|---|---|---|
| Michigan $ | 8 | – | 1 | – | 0 | 8 | – | 4 | – | 0 |
| No. 12 Ohio State | 7 | – | 1 | – | 0 | 9 | – | 3 | – | 0 |
| Iowa | 6 | – | 2 | – | 0 | 8 | – | 4 | – | 0 |
| Illinois | 6 | – | 3 | – | 0 | 7 | – | 5 | – | 0 |
| Wisconsin | 5 | – | 4 | – | 0 | 7 | – | 5 | – | 0 |
| Indiana | 4 | – | 5 | – | 0 | 5 | – | 6 | – | 0 |
| Purdue | 3 | – | 6 | – | 0 | 3 | – | 8 | – | 0 |
| Northwestern | 2 | – | 7 | – | 0 | 3 | – | 8 | – | 0 |
| Michigan State | 2 | – | 7 | – | 0 | 2 | – | 9 | – | 0 |
| Minnesota | 1 | – | 8 | – | 0 | 3 | – | 8 | – | 0 |
$ – Conference champion; Rankings from AP Poll

The 1982 Michigan State Spartans football team was an American football team that represented Michigan State University as a member of the Big Ten Conference during the 1982 Big Ten football season. In their third and final season under head coach Muddy Waters, the Spartans compiled a 2–9 record (2–7 in conference games), tied for eighth place in the Big Ten, and were outscored by a total of 242 to 202. In three games against ranked opponents, they lost to No. 12 Ohio State, No. 16 Miami (FL), and No. 11 Notre Dame.

On offense, the Spartans gained an average of 104.1 rushing yards and 173.5 passing yards per game. On defense, they held opponents to an average of 147.7 rushing yards and 204.3 passing yards per game. The team's statistical leaders included quarterback John Lester with 1,321 passing yards, Tony Ellis with 671 rushing yards, Otis Grant with 36 receptions and 547 receiving yards, and kicker Ralf Mojsiejenko with 58 points scored (14 of 20 field goals, 16 of 16 extra points).

Two Spartans were recognized by the Associated Press (AP) and/or the United Press International (UPI) on the 1982 All-Big Ten Conference football team: linebacker Carl Banks (AP-1; UPI-1); and defensive lineman Smiley Creswell (AP-2; UPI-2). Linebacker James Neely was selected by his teammates as the team's most valuable player for the 1982 season.

The team played its home games at Spartan Stadium in East Lansing, Michigan.

== Schedule ==
| Date | Time | Opponent | Site | Result | Attendance | Source |
|---|---|---|---|---|---|---|
| September 11 | | at Illinois | Memorial Stadium; Champaign, IL | L 16–23 | 66,152 | |
| September 18 | | No. 12 Ohio State | Spartan Stadium; East Lansing, MI | L 10–31 | 73,483 | |
| September 25 | 4:00 p.m. | at No. 16 Miami (FL)* | Miami Orange Bowl; Miami, FL | L 22–25 | 26,748 | |
| October 2 | | No. 11 Notre Dame* | Spartan Stadium; East Lansing, MI (rivalry) | L 3–11 | 77,119 | |
| October 9 | | at Michigan | Michigan Stadium; Ann Arbor, MI (rivalry) | L 17–31 | 106,113 | |
| October 16 | | at Wisconsin | Camp Randall Stadium; Madison, WI | L 23–24 | 78,187 | |
| October 23 | | Purdue^{†} | Spartan Stadium; East Lansing, MI | L 21–24 | 66,707 | |
| October 30 | | at Indiana | Memorial Stadium; Bloomington, IN (rivalry) | W 22–14 | 38,571 | |
| November 6 | | Northwestern | Spartan Stadium; East Lansing, MI | L 24–28 | 53,513 | |
| November 13 | | at Minnesota | Hubert H. Humphrey Metrodome; Minneapolis, MN | W 26–7 | 57,146 | |
| November 20 | | Iowa | Spartan Stadium; East Lansing, MI | L 18–24 | 50,103 | |
*Non-conference game; ^{†}Homecoming; Rankings from AP Poll released prior to the game; All times are in Eastern time

== Game summaries ==
=== At Miami (FL) ===
Michigan State at Miami (FL)

| Team | 1 | 2 | 3 | 4 | Total |
|---|---|---|---|---|---|
| Spartans | 0 | 14 | 8 | 0 | 22 |
| • Hurricanes | 6 | 9 | 3 | 7 | 25 |

- Date: September 25
- Location: Orange Bowl • Miami, Florida

Scoring summary
| 1 | MIA | Baratta 3-yard pass from Richt (kick failed) | Miami (FL) 6-0 |
| 2 | MIA | Boone 63-yard interception return (pass failed) | Miami (FL) 12-0 |
| 2 | MSU | Ellis 16-yard run (Mojsiejenko kick) | Miami (FL) 12-7 |
| 2 | MSU | Grant 15-yard pass from Leister (Mojsiejenko kick) | Michigan St 14-12 |
| 2 | MIA | Davis 46-yard field goal | Miami (FL) 15-14 |
| 3 | MSU | Ellis 6-yard run (Tanker pass from Scharlo) | Michigan St 22-15 |
| 3 | MIA | Davis 47-yard field goal | Michigan St 22-18 |
| 4 | MIA | Rush 1-yard run (Davis kick) | Miami (FL) 25-22 |

=== Notre Dame ===
Notre Dame at Michigan State

| Team | 1 | 2 | 3 | 4 | Total |
|---|---|---|---|---|---|
| • Fighting Irish | 2 | 9 | 0 | 0 | 11 |
| Spartans | 0 | 0 | 3 | 0 | 3 |

- Date: October 2
- Location: Spartan Stadium, East Lansing, MI
- Game attendance: 77,119

Scoring summary
| Q1 | ND | Leister tackled in end zone | ND 2–0 |
| Q2 | ND | Johnston 33 yard field goal | ND 5–0 |
| Q2 | ND | Johnston 29 yard field goal | ND 8–0 |
| Q2 | ND | Johnston 42 yard field goal | ND 11–0 |
| Q3 | MSU | Mojsiejenko 50 yard field goal | ND 11–3 |

=== Iowa ===
Iowa at Michigan State

| Team | 1 | 2 | 3 | 4 | Total |
|---|---|---|---|---|---|
| • Hawkeyes | 10 | 14 | 0 | 0 | 24 |
| Spartans | 0 | 3 | 0 | 15 | 18 |

- Date: November 20
- Location: Spartan Stadium, East Lansing, MI
- Game start: 1:02 p.m. EST
- Elapsed time: 3:04
- Game attendance: 50,103
- Game weather: 57 °F (14 °C), Breezy and warm, chance of rain, Wind SSE 15 mph (24 km/h)
- Referee: John Nealon

Scoring summary
| Q1 | 7:19 | IOWA | Nichol 43-yard field goal | IOWA 3–0 |
| Q1 | 3:59 | IOWA | Owen Gill 10-yard run (Nichol kick) | IOWA 10–0 |
| Q2 | 11:49 | IOWA | Owen Gill 5-yard run (Nichol kick) | IOWA 17–0 |
| Q2 | 6:37 | MSU | Mojsiejenko 39-yard field goal | IOWA 17–3 |
| Q2 | 1:04 | IOWA | Owen Gill 11-yard run (Nichol kick) | IOWA 24–3 |
| Q4 | 7:27 | MSU | Ellis 1-yard run (Mojsiejenko kick) | IOWA 24–10 |
| Q4 | 1:23 | MSU | Ellis 2-yard run (Schario run) | IOWA 24–18 |

== Roster ==
1982 Michigan State Spartans football team roster
Players
Coaches
Offense

| Pos. | # | Name | Class |
|---|---|---|---|
| TE | 34 | Tom Robinson | Jr |

Defense

| Pos. | # | Name | Class |
|---|---|---|---|
| LB | 54 | Carl Banks | Jr |
| S | 32 | Phil Parker | Fr |
| DE | 93 | Kelly Quinn | Fr |

Special teams

| Pos. | # | Name | Class |
|---|---|---|---|
| P/K | 2 | Ralf Mojsiejenko | So |

Head coach

- Muddy Waters

Coordinators/assistant coaches

Legend

- (C) Team captain
- (S) Suspended
- (I) Ineligible
- Injured
- Redshirt
