= 1982 Purdue Boilermakers football team =

American college football season

1982 Purdue Boilermakers football
- Conference: Big Ten Conference
- Record: 3–8 (3–6 Big Ten)
- Head coach: Leon Burtnett (1st season)
- Offensive coordinator: Jim Colletto (1st season)
- Defensive coordinator: Bob Cope (1st season)
- MVP: Mark Brown
- Captains: Mark Brown; Chris Prince
- Home stadium: Ross–Ade Stadium

1982 Big Ten Conference football standings
	Conf.					Overall
Team	W		L		T	W		L		T
Michigan $	8	–	1	–	0	8	–	4	–	0
No. 12 Ohio State	7	–	1	–	0	9	–	3	–	0
Iowa	6	–	2	–	0	8	–	4	–	0
Illinois	6	–	3	–	0	7	–	5	–	0
Wisconsin	5	–	4	–	0	7	–	5	–	0
Indiana	4	–	5	–	0	5	–	6	–	0
Purdue	3	–	6	–	0	3	–	8	–	0
Northwestern	2	–	7	–	0	3	–	8	–	0
Michigan State	2	–	7	–	0	2	–	9	–	0
Minnesota	1	–	8	–	0	3	–	8	–	0
$ – Conference champion; Rankings from AP Poll

The 1982 Purdue Boilermakers football team represented Purdue University during the 1982 Big Ten Conference football season. Led by first-year head coach Leon Burtnett, the Boilermakers compiled an overall record of 3–8 with a mark of 3–6 in conference play, placing seventh in the Big Ten. Purdue played home games at Ross–Ade Stadium in West Lafayette, Indiana.

== Schedule ==
Date	Time	Opponent	Site	Result	Attendance	Source
September 11	1:33 p.m.	Stanford*	Ross–Ade Stadium; West Lafayette, IN	L 14–35	64,381	
September 18		Minnesota	Ross–Ade Stadium; West Lafayette, IN	L 10–36	63,247	
September 25		at No. 10 Notre Dame*	Notre Dame Stadium; Notre Dame, IN (rivalry)	L 14–28	59,075	
October 2		Wisconsin	Ross–Ade Stadium; West Lafayette, IN	L 31–35	69,132	
October 9		at No. 20 Illinois	Memorial Stadium; Champaign, IL (rivalry)	L 34–38	71,232	
October 16		Northwestern^{†}	Ross–Ade Stadium; West Lafayette, IN	W 34–21	67,659	
October 23		at Michigan State	Spartan Stadium; East Lansing, MI	W 24–21	66,707	
October 30		at Ohio State	Ohio Stadium; Columbus, OH	L 6–38	89,341	
November 6		Iowa	Ross–Ade Stadium; West Lafayette, IN	W 16–7	67,002	
November 13		at No. 14 Michigan	Michigan Stadium; Ann Arbor, MI	L 21–52	105,281	
November 20		Indiana	Ross–Ade Stadium; West Lafayette, IN (Old Oaken Bucket)	L 7–13	69,745	
*Non-conference game; ^{†}Homecoming; Rankings from AP Poll released prior to the game; All times are in Eastern time

== Game summaries ==
=== At Notre Dame ===
Purdue at Notre Dame

Team	1	2	3	4	Total
Boilermakers	0	14	0	0	14
• Fighting Irish	7	7	7	7	28

- Date: September 25
- Location: Notre Dame Stadium • South Bend, Indiana

Scoring summary
1	ND	Moriarty 2-yard run (Johnston kick)	Notre Dame 7-0
2	ND	Moriarty 3-yard run (Johnston kick)	Notre Dame 14-0
2	PUR	King 2-yard pass from Campbell (Clark kick)	Notre Dame 14-7
2	PUR	Benson 5-yard pass from Campbell (Clark kick)	Tie 14-14
3	ND	Carter 6-yard run (Johnston kick)	Notre Dame 21-14
4	ND	Carter 10-yard run (Johnston kick)	Notre Dame 28-14

=== Northwestern ===
Northwestern at Purdue

Team	1	2	3	4	Total
Wildcats	7	0	0	14	21
• Boilermakers	0	14	13	7	34

- Date: October 17
- Location: Ross–Ade Stadium, West Lafayette, IN
- Game attendance: 67,659

Scoring summary
Q1	NW	Jenkins 3 yard pass from Schwab (Jolas kick)	NW 7–0
Q2	PUR	Gray 2 yard run (Clark kick)	Tie 7–7
Q2	PUR	Gray 1 yard run (Clark kick)	PUR 14–7
Q3	PUR	Taylor 8 yard pass from Campbell (kick failed)	PUR 20–7
Q3	PUR	Griffin 4 yard pass from Campbell (Clark kick)	PUR 27–7
Q4	NW	Jenkins 4 yard pass from Schwab (Jolas kick)	PUR 27–14
Q4	PUR	Richardson 9 yard run (Clark kick)	PUR 34–14
Q4	NW	Edwards 2 yard run (Jolas kick)	PUR 34–21

Mel Gray 25 rushes, 193 yards (career-high)

=== At Michigan State ===
- Scott Campbell 24/43, 324 yards

=== At Ohio State ===
- Scott Campbell 28/55, 333 yards

=== At Michigan ===
- Scott Campbell 29/49, 331 yards

== Roster ==
1982 Purdue Boilermakers football team roster
Players
Coaches
Offense

Pos.	#	Name	Class
OL		Paul Alekna
TE	81	Cliff Benson	Jr
OL		Mike Brown
WR		Rick Brunner
QB	10	Scott Campbell	Jr
RB		Rodney Carter
WR		Scott Craig
QB	11	Jim Everett	So
RB		Jeff Feulner
OL		Claybon Fields
OL		John Fitzpatrick
RB	32	Mel Gray	Jr
WR		Steve Griffin
RB		Lloyd Hawthorne
OL		Tom Jelesky
RB	37	Bruce King	So
WR		Joe Linville
WR		Everett Pickens
OL		Chris Prince
WR		Dave Retherford
RB		Tim Richarson
OL		Paul Royer
TE		Marty Scott
OL		Pat Snyder

Defense

Pos.	#	Name	Class
CB	15	Don Anderson	So
LB	59	Mark Brown	Sr
DL		Matt Hernandez
DL		Brad Hornor
DL		Chris Scott
DE		Derek Wimberly

Special teams

Pos.	#	Name	Class
K		Tim Clark

Head coach

- Leon Burtnett

Coordinators/assistant coaches

- Bob Spoo
- Bobby Williams (GA)

Legend

- (C) Team captain
- (S) Suspended
- (I) Ineligible
- Injured
- Redshirt
