= 1982 Illinois Fighting Illini football team =

American college football season

1982 Illinois Fighting Illini football

Liberty Bowl, L 15–21 vs. Alabama
- Conference: Big Ten Conference
- Record: 7–5 (6–3 Big Ten)
- Head coach: Mike White (3rd season)
- MVP: Tony Eason
- Captains: Mike Bass; Dan Gregus; Mike Martin
- Home stadium: Memorial Stadium

1982 Big Ten Conference football standings
	Conf.					Overall
Team	W		L		T	W		L		T
Michigan $	8	–	1	–	0	8	–	4	–	0
No. 12 Ohio State	7	–	1	–	0	9	–	3	–	0
Iowa	6	–	2	–	0	8	–	4	–	0
Illinois	6	–	3	–	0	7	–	5	–	0
Wisconsin	5	–	4	–	0	7	–	5	–	0
Indiana	4	–	5	–	0	5	–	6	–	0
Purdue	3	–	6	–	0	3	–	8	–	0
Northwestern	2	–	7	–	0	3	–	8	–	0
Michigan State	2	–	7	–	0	2	–	9	–	0
Minnesota	1	–	8	–	0	3	–	8	–	0
$ – Conference champion; Rankings from AP Poll

The 1982 Illinois Fighting Illini football team was an American football team that represented the University of Illinois at Urbana-Champaign as a member of the Big Ten Conference during the 1982 Big Ten season. In their third year under head coach Mike White, the Illini compiled a 7–4 record (6–3 in conference games), finished in fourth place in the Big Ten, and outscored opponents by a total of 323 to 208. They concluded the season with a loss to Alabama in the 1982 Liberty Bowl, which was Hall of Famer Bear Bryant's final game as Alabama's head coach.

Quarterback Tony Eason led the Big Ten with 278 completions, 450 passes, 3,248 passing yards, and 17 touchdowns. Wide receiver Mike Martin led the conference with 69 receptions and 941 receiving yards. Kicker Mike Bass was the Big Ten in scoring with 101 points and 23 field goals made. Running back Dwight Beverly led the team with 390 rushing yards, an average of 5.3 yards per carry. Eason was selected as the team's most valuable player. Eason, Martin, and Bass won first-team honors on the 1982 All-Big Ten Conference football team.

The team played its home games at Memorial Stadium in Champaign, Illinois.

== Schedule ==
Date	Opponent	Rank	Site	Result	Attendance	Source
September 4	Northwestern		Memorial Stadium; Champaign, IL (rivalry)	W 49–13	67,036	
September 11	Michigan State		Memorial Stadium; Champaign, IL	W 23–16	66,152	
September 18	at Syracuse*		Carrier Dome; Syracuse, NY	W 47–10	30,128	
September 25	No. 3 Pittsburgh*	No. 19	Memorial Stadium; Champaign, IL	L 3–20	71,547	
October 2	at No. 19 Minnesota		Hubert H. Humphrey Metrodome; Minneapolis, MN	W 42–24	63,684	
October 9	Purdue	No. 20	Memorial Stadium; Champaign, IL (rivalry)	W 38–34	71,232	
October 16	Ohio State	No. 15	Memorial Stadium; Champaign, IL (Illibuck)	L 21–26	73,488	
October 23	at Wisconsin		Camp Randall Stadium; Madison, WI	W 29–28	78,406	
October 30	at Iowa		Kinnick Stadium; Iowa City, IA	L 13–14	59,922	
November 6	No. 15 Michigan		Memorial Stadium; Champaign, IL (rivalry)	L 10–16	75,256	
November 13	at Indiana		Memorial Stadium; Bloomington, IN (rivalry)	W 48–7	38,471	
December 29	vs. Alabama*		Liberty Bowl Memorial Stadium; Memphis, TN (Liberty Bowl)	L 15–21	54,123	
*Non-conference game; Rankings from AP Poll released prior to the game

== Roster ==
1982 Illinois Fighting Illini football team roster
Players
Coaches
Offense

Pos.	#	Name	Class
QB	3	Tony Eason	Sr
C	55	Adam Lingner	Sr
RB	42	Thomas Rooks	Fr

Defense

Pos.	#	Name	Class

Special teams

Pos.	#	Name	Class

Head coach

- Mike White

Coordinators/assistant coaches

- Brad Childress (Wide receivers)

Legend

- (C) Team captain
- (S) Suspended
- (I) Ineligible
- Injured
- Redshirt
