= 1982 Independence Bowl =

Wisconsin Badgers	Kansas State Wildcats
(6–5)	(6–4–1)
Big Ten	Big Eight
14	3
Head coach: Dave McClain	Head coach: Jim Dickey
	1	2	3	4	Total
Wisconsin	0	7	7	0	14
Kansas State	0	3	0	0	3
- Date: December 11, 1982
- Season: 1982
- Stadium: Independence Stadium
- Location: Shreveport, Louisiana
- MVP: Randy Wright and Tim Krumrie
- National anthem: Centenary College Choir
- Referee: Dick Burleson (SEC)
- Attendance: 49,523
- Payout: US$600,000

United States TV coverage
- Network: Mizlou Television Network/ESPN
- Announcers: Howard David, Danny Abramowicz, Steve Grad

The 1982 Independence Bowl was a post-season American college football bowl game between the Wisconsin Badgers and the Kansas State Wildcats at Independence Stadium in Shreveport, Louisiana on December 11, 1982. The game was the final contest of the 1982 NCAA Division I-A football season for both teams, and ended in a 14–3 victory for the Badgers.

The contest was the first college football game televised live by ESPN, and it was Wisconsin's first bowl victory. The national anthem was performed by the Centenary College Choir. At kickoff, field temperature was 32 °F (0 °C) with freezing rain falling.

== Game summary ==
Wisconsin quarterback Randy Wright tossed two touchdown passes as the Badgers overcame an early Kansas State lead for a hard-earned 14–3 victory over the Wildcats in the seventh annual Independence Bowl.

The game, played in cold and wet conditions before an announced crowd of 49,523, marked the first-ever Bowl appearance by Kansas State. A 23 mile-per-hour wind dropped the wind chill to near zero and kept many fans away despite both schools being used to such conditions.

After a scoreless first quarter, K-State took the game's first lead with 7:10 left in the second period when Steve Willis booted a 29-yard field goal after defensive end Bob Daniels recovered a fumble at the Badger 18-yard line.

The Wildcats' lead was short-lived, however. On Wisconsin 's ensuing drive following the field goal, the Badgers marched 79 yards in eight plays, scoring a touchdown on a 16-yard pass from Wright to Michael Jones to give UW a 7–3 halftime lead.

Wisconsin struck again midway through the third quarter, when game offensive MVP Wright connected with Tim Stracka on an 87-yard touchdown pass for a 14–3 Badger advantage.

K-State drove deep into Wisconsin territory on its next two possessions, but was unable to score.

One opportunity ended when a Wildcat pass was intercepted in the Badger end zone, while a second was stymied at the Wisconsin 26-yard line, when K-State could not convert on fourth down.

Darrell Ray Dickey completed 13 of 35 passes for 127 yards and one interception on the game for 1982 Big Eight Coach of the Year Jim Dickey's Wildcat squad.

The 35 pass attempts stood as a Kansas State bowl record until 2004, when Ell Roberson's 51 attempts in the 2004 Tostitos Fiesta Bowl vs. Ohio State.
