= Ron Corradini =

American football coach (born 1936–1937)

Biographical details
- Born: c. 1936 or 1937 (age 89–90)
- Education: Miami University (1961)

Playing career
- c. 1950s: Miami (OH)

Coaching career (HC unless noted)

Football
- 1961–1962: Miami (OH) (GA)
- 1963–1968: Princeton HS (OH) (assistant)
- 1969–1973: Miami (OH) (DL)
- 1974–1978: Colorado (assistant)
- 1979–1980: Wichita State (DC/S)
- 1981–1983: Indiana (DC)
- 1984–1985: Cincinnati (assistant)
- 1986–1992: Sycamore HS (OH)
- 1993–1999: Mount St. Joseph

Wrestling
- 1963–1968: Princeton HS (OH)
- 1993–?: Mount St. Joseph

Head coaching record
- Overall: 23–44–2 (college football)

Ron Corradini (born c. 1936 or 1937) is an American former college football coach. He was the head football coach for Mount St. Joseph University from 1993 to 1999 and Sycamore High School from 1986 to 1992. He also coached for Miami (OH), Princeton High School, Colorado, Wichita State, Indiana, and Cincinnati. He played college football for Miami (OH).

== Head coaching record ==
=== College football ===
Year	Team	Overall	Conference	Standing	Bowl/playoffs
Mount St. Joseph Lions (NAIA Division II independent) (1993–1994)
1993	Mount St. Joseph	3–6–1			
1994	Mount St. Joseph	2–8			
Mount St. Joseph Lions (Association of Mideast Colleges) (1995)
1995	Mount St. Joseph	5–4	1–2		
Mount St. Joseph Lions (NCAA Division III independent) (1996–1997)
1996	Mount St. Joseph	5–5			
1997	Mount St. Joseph	4–5–1			
Mount St. Joseph Lions (Heartland Collegiate Athletic Conference) (1998–1999)
1997	Mount St. Joseph	2–8	2–5	T–6th	
1999	Mount St. Joseph	2–8	0–7	8th	
Mount St. Joseph:		23–44–2	3–14		
Total:		23–44–2			
