= Mark Shumate =

American gridiron football player (born 1960)

No. 96, 71
- Position: Nose tackle

Personal information
- Born: March 30, 1960 (age 66); Poynette, Wisconsin, U.S.
- Listed height: 6 ft 5 in (1.96 m)
- Listed weight: 265 lb (120 kg)

Career information
- High school: Poynette
- College: Wisconsin
- NFL draft: 1983: 10th round, 257 (by the Kansas City Chiefs)th overall pick

Career history
- Kansas City Chiefs (1983)*; Edmonton Eskimos (1984); New York Jets (1985); Green Bay Packers (1985)
- * Offseason or practice squad member only

Awards and highlights
- Second-team All-Big Ten (1981)

Career NFL statistics
- Games played: 8
- Stats at Pro Football Reference

Mark Anthony Shumate (born March 30, 1960) is an American former professional football player who was a nose tackle in the National Football League (NFL). He played at the college football for the Wisconsin Badgers and was selected by the Kansas City Chiefs in the tenth round of the 1983 NFL draft with the 257th overall pick. Shumate played in the NFL for the New York Jets and the Green Bay Packers, both in 1985 with four games each.
