= Leon Burtnett =

American football coach (1943–2021)

Biographical details
- Born: May 30, 1943; Fresno, California, U.S.
- Died: June 1, 2021 (aged 78); Jonesboro, Arkansas, U.S.

Coaching career (HC unless noted)
- 1965–1966: Mt. Hope HS (KS)
- 1967–1968: Sterling HS (KS)
- 1969: Colorado State (GA)
- 1970: Montana State (DB)
- 1971: Washington State (DB)
- 1972–1973: Wyoming (DB)
- 1974–1975: San Jose State (LB)
- 1976: Michigan State (LB)
- 1977–1981: Purdue (DC)
- 1982–1986: Purdue
- 1987–1991: Indianapolis Colts (RB)
- 1994–1995: Fresno State (DC)
- 1996–1998: Northeast Louisiana (DC)
- 1999–2001: Arkansas State (DC)
- 2003–2007: Washington State (LB)
- 2008–2010: Houston (LB)
- 2011: Houston (DPP/QC)
- 2012: Montana (S)

Head coaching record
- Overall: 21–34–1 (college)
- Bowls: 0–1

Accomplishments and honors

Awards
- Big Ten Coach of the Year (1984)

James Leon Burtnett (May 30, 1943 – June 1, 2021) was an American football coach. He served as the head football coach at Purdue University from 1982 to 1986, compiling a record of 21–34–1.

In November 1981, Burtnett was promoted as Purdue's 30th head football coach. During the 1984 campaign, Burtnett's team posted its best season, in which the highlight of the year was beating number 2 Ohio State 28–23. The 1984 squad's 7–4 record earned Burtnett the Big Ten Coach of the Year, leading the Boilermakers to the Peach Bowl. His success that year earned him a contract extension through 1990. Burtnett's teams didn't improve after 1984, and after a 3–8 season in 1986, Burtnett resigned as head coach.

Burtnett has been an assistant coach for several schools, including Washington State University, San Jose State University, Michigan State University, Montana State University, Fresno State University, Colorado State University, Northeast Louisiana University, and Arkansas State University. In addition, Burtnett was an assistant under former Purdue Alumnus Ron Meyer with the Indianapolis Colts of the National Football League (NFL). He died two days after his 78th birthday, on June 1, 2021.

== Head coaching record ==
=== College ===
Year	Team	Overall	Conference	Standing	Bowl/playoffs
Purdue Boilermakers (Big Ten Conference) (1982–1986)
1982	Purdue	3–8	3–6	7th	
1983	Purdue	3–7–1	3–5–1	6th	
1984	Purdue	7–5	6–3	T–2nd	L Peach
1985	Purdue	5–6	3–5	7th	
1986	Purdue	3–8	2–6	T–8th	
Purdue:		21–34–1	17–25–1		
Total:		21–34–1			
