= Brett Miller (American football) =

American football player (born 1958)

No. 62, 74, 72
- Position: Offensive tackle

Personal information
- Born: October 2, 1958 (age 68); Lynwood, California, U.S.
- Listed height: 6 ft 7 in (2.01 m)
- Listed weight: 293 lb (133 kg)

Career information
- High school: Glendale (Glendale, California)
- College: Iowa
- NFL draft: 1983: 5th round, 129th overall pick

Career history
- Atlanta Falcons (1983–1988); San Diego Chargers (1989); New York Jets (1990–1992)

Awards and highlights
- Second-team All-Big Ten (1982)

Career NFL statistics
- Games played: 118
- Games started: 63
- Fumble recoveries: 1
- Stats at Pro Football Reference

Brett Kolste Miller (born October 2, 1958) is an American former professional football player who was an offensive tackle for 10 seasons in the National Football League (NFL). He played college football for the Iowa Hawkeyes. After his football career, he was the weekend sports anchor for KTLA's Prime News.
