= Sandy Schwab =

Profile
- Position: Quarterback

Career information
- High school: Piedmont (CA)
- College: Northwestern (1982–1985)

Sandy Schwab (born c 1964) is a foremr American football quarterback. He played high school football at Piedmont High School in Piedmont, California, and college football for the Northwestern Wildcats from 1982 to 1985. As a freshman in 1982, he ranked among the leading quarterbacks in major-college football with 504 total plays (4th), 20 passing interceptions (4th), 234 pass completions (5th), 416 pass attempts (4th), 2,735 passing yards (9th), and 248.6 yards gained per game (9th).
