= Tim Stracka =

American football player (born 1959)

No. 87
- Position: Tight end

Personal information
- Born: September 27, 1959 (age 67); Madison, Wisconsin, U.S.
- Listed height: 6 ft 3 in (1.91 m)
- Listed weight: 225 lb (102 kg)

Career information
- College: Wisconsin
- NFL draft: 1983: 6th round, 145th overall pick

Career history
- Cleveland Browns (1983–1984); Chicago Bears (1986)*
- * Offseason or practice squad member only

Career NFL statistics
- Receptions: 2
- Receiving yards: 27
- Stats at Pro Football Reference

Timothy Terrill Stracka (born September 27, 1959) is an American former professional football player who was a tight end in the National Football League (NFL). He played for the Cleveland Browns (1983–1984). He played college football for the Wisconsin Badgers; before that, Stracka was the star of Madison West High School's 1977 Division 1 Wisconsin state champion football team. Stracka is currently Founding Principal, Director-Institutional Sales at 1492 Capital Management in Milwaukee, Wisconsin.
