= Lawrence Ricks =

American football player (born 1961)

No. 46, 42
- Position: Running back

Personal information
- Born: June 4, 1961 (age 65); Barberton, Ohio, U.S.
- Listed height: 5 ft 9 in (1.75 m)
- Listed weight: 194 lb (88 kg)

Career information
- High school: Barberton
- College: Michigan
- NFL draft: 1983: 8th round, 220th overall pick

Career history
- Dallas Cowboys (1983)*; Kansas City Chiefs (1983–1984)
- * Offseason or practice squad member only

Awards and highlights
- First-team All-Big Ten (1982)

Career NFL statistics
- Rushing yards: 29
- Rushing average: 1.3
- Receptions: 3
- Receiving yards: 5
- Stats at Pro Football Reference

Lawrence Tallmagde Ricks (born June 4, 1961) is an American former professional football player who was a running back for the Kansas City Chiefs of the National Football League (NFL). He played college football as a tailback for the Michigan Wolverines from 1979 to 1982 and was selected as a first-team running back on the 1982 All-Big Ten Conference football team. He was selected by the Dallas Cowboys in the eighth round of the 1983 NFL draft and was traded to the Chiefs, where he played running back and kick returner in 1983 and 1984.

== Early life ==
Ricks was born in Barberton, Ohio, in 1961. He attended Barberton High School. In October 1978, he rushed for 215 yards on 19 carries and four touchdowns in a 34-0 victory over Walsh Jesuit High School. He was a part of the Barberton High National Honor Society.

== College career ==
Ricks enrolled at the University of Michigan in 1979 and played college football for Bo Schembechler's Michigan Wolverines football teams from 1979 to 1982. As a sophomore, Ricks shared the tailback position on the 1980 Michigan Wolverines football team with Butch Woolfolk, with each starting six games at the position. He gained 850 rushing yards on 167 carries, with six rushing touchdowns.

As a junior, he saw his playing time reduced and was the team's fourth-leading rusher, gaining 413 yards on 86 carries for the 1981 Michigan team. Tailback Woolfolk, fullback Stan Edwards, and quarterback Steve Smith each had more rushing carries and yards than Ricks during the season.

Ricks had his best season as a senior for the 1982 Michigan team, taking over as Woolfolk's replacement. He started all 12 games at tailback and gained 1,388 rushing yards (second in the Big Ten and ninth in the nation) on 266 carries (5.2-yards per carry, 118.2-yards per game), with 8 touchdowns.

He had seven 100-yard games during the season, including a career-high 196-yard game against Purdue and a 177-yard game against Illinois. In his final game for Michigan, he was the rushing leader in the 1983 Rose Bowl against UCLA. At the end of the year, he was selected by the Associated Press as a first-team running back on the 1982 All-Big Ten Conference football team.

Over the course of his four-year career at Michigan, Ricks totaled 2,751 rushing yards (at the time fifth on the school's career list) on 541 carries (5.1 yards per carry) and 24 touchdowns.

== Professional career ==
=== Dallas Cowboys ===
Ricks was selected by the Dallas Cowboys in the eighth round (220th overall pick) of the 1983 NFL draft. He was also selected by the Michigan Panthers in the 1983 USFL Territorial Draft: On August 24, before the start of the season, he was traded to the Kansas City Chiefs in exchange for a seventh round draft choice (#178-Karl Powe). He only had one carry during the team's first three preseason games.

=== Kansas City Chiefs ===
Looking for a successor to the late Joe Delaney, the Kansas City Chiefs acquired a series of running backs during the 1983 preseason. Ricks appeared in 12 games (none as a starter), as a rookie, gaining only 28 rushing yards on 21 carries.

On August 30, 1984, he was placed on waivers by the Chiefs, but was re-signed three days later. During the season, he appeared in only five games and was used primarily as a kickoff returner. He gained one rushing yard on two carries and 83 return yards on five kickoff returns.

== See also ==
- Lists of Michigan Wolverines football rushing leaders
