= Babe Laufenberg =

American football player (born 1959)

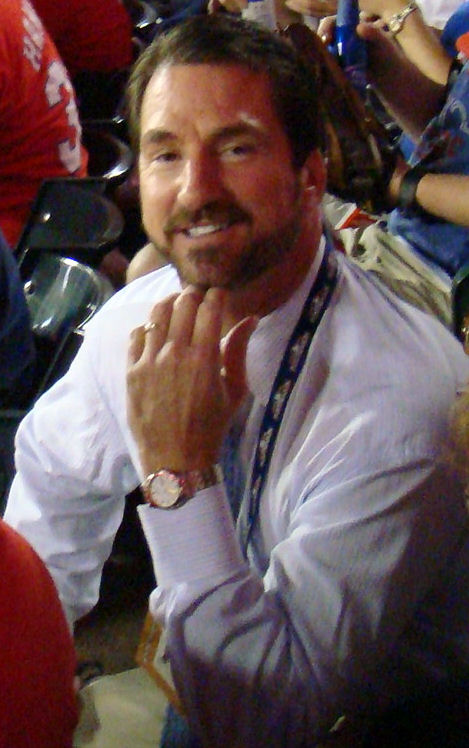
- Laufenberg at the 2010 World Series

No. 12, 15, 16, 11
- Position: Quarterback

Personal information
- Born: December 5, 1959 (age 66); Burbank, California, U.S.
- Listed height: 6 ft 2 in (1.88 m)
- Listed weight: 195 lb (88 kg)

Career information
- High school: Crespi Carmelite (Encino, California)
- College: Indiana
- NFL draft: 1983: 6th round, 168th overall pick

Career history
- Washington Redskins (1983–1984); San Diego Chargers (1985); Washington Redskins (1985); New Orleans Saints (1986); Kansas City Chiefs (1987)*; Washington Redskins (1987); San Diego Chargers (1988); Dallas Cowboys (1989–1990); Ohio Glory (1992)
- * Offseason or practice squad member only

Awards and highlights
- Second-team All-Big Ten (1982)

Career NFL statistics
- Passing attempts: 211
- Passing completions: 93
- Completion percentage: 44.1%
- TD–INT: 5–11
- Passing yards: 1,057
- Passer rating: 45.9
- Stats at Pro Football Reference

Brandon Hugh "Babe" Laufenberg (born December 5, 1959) is an American former professional football player who was a quarterback in the National Football League (NFL) for eight years. He played college football for the Indiana Hoosiers and was selected in the sixth round of the 1983 NFL draft. He played in the NFL for the Washington Redskins, San Diego Chargers, New Orleans Saints, Dallas Cowboys, and Kansas City Chiefs. He also was a member of the Ohio Glory in the World League of American Football (WLAF).

== Early life ==
Laufenberg grew up in Encino, California and was dubbed Babe by his brother Jeff because he was the youngest in the family. He attended Crespi Carmelite High School, where he was a two-year starter at quarterback and left as the school's all-time leading passer with 2,678 yards on 184 completions.

As a senior, he received Parade All-American and All-Southern Section honors, after leading his team to the playoffs. He also played baseball and was drafted by the San Francisco Giants.

== College career ==
Laufenberg accepted a football scholarship from Stanford University, where Bill Walsh was the head coach at the time. He was redshirted as a freshman behind Steve Dils. The next year John Elway enrolled at the school, so Laufenberg decided to transfer to the University of Missouri after being listed third-string on the depth chart. At the time, Missouri had just implemented the veer offense and Phil Bradley was the starting quarterback, so he opted to transfer at the end of his first semester to Los Angeles Pierce College near his home.

In 1980, Laufenberg passed for 1,590 yards and received offers from Big Ten Conference schools. He accepted a scholarship from head coach Lee Corso at Indiana University Bloomington, where he became a two-year starter at quarterback for the Hoosiers.

As a junior, Laufenberg had a 3–8 record, registering 1,788 passing yards, 8 touchdowns and 11 interceptions. In his final year, he posted a 5–6 record, 2,468 passing yards, 11 touchdowns and 14 interceptions, receiving honorable-mention All-Big Ten honors.

Laufenberg finished his college career with school records for single-season passing yards (2,468), single-game passing yards (390), career pass completions (361), single-season pass completions (217), single-game pass completions (34), single-season attempts (364), career completion percentage (.586), single-season completion percentage (.596). He also was 2–0 against Purdue University.

== Professional career ==
=== Washington Redskins (first stint) ===
Laufenberg was selected by the Washington Redskins in the sixth round (168th overall) of the 1983 NFL draft. He was also selected by the Chicago Blitz in the 20th round (235th overall) of the 1983 USFL draft. As a rookie, he was declared inactive for every game as the third-string quarterback, on a team that reached Super Bowl XVIII. The next year, he was placed on the injured reserve list with a strained shoulder.

In 1985, he competed with Jay Schroeder for the backup position behind Joe Theismann. He was waived on September 2, after the team decided to keep only two quarterbacks on the roster.

=== San Diego Chargers (first stint) ===
On October 1, 1985, Laufenberg was signed by the San Diego Chargers to backup Mark Herrmann after starter Dan Fouts suffered a knee injury, but was cut on October 15, to make room for quarterback Joe Dufek.

=== Washington Redskins (second stint) ===
On November 21, 1985, Laufenberg was signed to back up Jay Schroeder for the final five games of the season, after linebacker Lawrence Taylor broke Theismann's right leg on Monday Night Football.

In 1986, he competed for a backup position in preseason against the recently signed Doug Williams and rookie Mark Rypien. He was released on August 26.

Though he never appeared in a regular season or playoff game during his time with the Redskins, Laufenberg was a very popular player with the fans and the media. He was called "Mr. August" for his come-from-behind wins in preseason.

=== New Orleans Saints ===
On August 28, 1986, Laufenberg was claimed off waivers by the New Orleans Saints, but was released four days later, when the team decided to keep only two quarterbacks. On September 22, he was brought back after Bobby Hebert suffered a broken foot and got a chance to play in his first regular-season game, coming in to run out the clock in a 38–7 win against Tampa Bay.

=== Kansas City Chiefs ===
On May 28, 1987, Laufenberg was signed as a free agent by the Kansas City Chiefs and was released on September 1.

=== Washington Redskins (third stint) ===
On September 14, 1987, he was signed to serve as Williams' backup after Schroeder sprained his right shoulder in the season opener. The players would go on a strike on the third week of the season, those games were canceled (reducing the 16-game season to 15) and the NFL decided that the next games would be played with replacement players.

Although he didn't cross the picket line, he was released when Schroeder returned to the lineup on October 27. Because he was on the roster for only two games, he missed out on getting a Super Bowl share by one game.

=== San Diego Chargers (second stint) ===
On April 21, 1988, he was signed as a free agent by the San Diego Chargers, reuniting with new offensive coordinator Jerry Rhome who was his quarterback coach with the Redskins. Presented with an opportunity to compete for the starter job that was left open with Fouts retirement, he beat out Mark Malone and got a chance to record his first start and thrown pass in the NFL.

Laufenberg started the first 6 games of season, before suffering 3 broken ribs against the New Orleans Saints. He appeared in 8 games, registered 2 wins, while completing 69 of 144 passes for 778 yards with 4 touchdowns and 5 interceptions. He was cut on April 17, 1989.

=== Dallas Cowboys ===
In 1989, he signed with the Dallas Cowboys, reuniting with Rhome who was the team's quarterback coach. He would also make the roster by beating Scott Secules for the third-string quarterback job.

In 1990, he was moved to the backup quarterback position after Steve Walsh was traded to the New Orleans Saints, 3 games into the season. The Cowboys had a 7–8 record and needed one win to secure a playoff berth, when Laufenberg was forced into action after quarterback Troy Aikman injured his right shoulder against the Philadelphia Eagles, resulting in a 17–3 loss. Facing the Atlanta Falcons (4–11) in the last game of the year as the starter, he completed 10 passes in 24 attempts for 129 yards and one touchdown, in a 26–7 loss that positioned the Saints for the final playoff wild card spot.

The next season, the team went into training camp with Aikman, Laufenberg, Cliff Stoudt and fourth-round draft choice Bill Musgrave at quarterback. He was cut on July 30, 1991. On August 25, the Cowboys traded for Steve Beuerlein to improve the backup position and released Stoudt and Musgrave, opting to keep just 2 quarterbacks.

Laufenberg is also credited with giving Daryl Johnston the nickname "Moose". In the offensive meetings, Johnston towered over the other fullbacks and Laufenberg said that he looked like, "A moose in a herd of deer".

=== Ohio Glory (WLAF) ===
In 1992, he was working as a sportscaster for the Cowboys' flagship radio station KVIL, when he was drafted number 2 overall by the Ohio Glory of the World League of American Football. He started the first 2 games before being passed on the depth chart by Pat O'Hara. He later got a chance to start in one additional game for an injured O'Hara. He posted 622 passing yards, 2 touchdowns, 6 interceptions and was sacked 14 times.

== Personal life ==
Laufenberg was the lead sports anchor and Sports Director for KTVT television in Fort Worth, from 1997 to January 14, 2015, but continues to serve as a color analyst on the Dallas Cowboys Radio Network. His co-host, Brad Sham, has called him the best color analyst in the business. The National Sports Media Association has named him 'Texas Sportscaster of the Year' three times.

In 2019, Laufenberg's son, Luke, died at age 21 of lymphoma.
