= 1983 Michigan Wolverines football team =

American college football season

1983 Michigan Wolverines football

Sugar Bowl, L 7–9 vs. Auburn
- Conference: Big Ten Conference

Ranking
- Coaches: No. 9
- AP: No. 8
- Record: 9–3 (8–1 Big Ten)
- Head coach: Bo Schembechler (15th season)
- Defensive coordinator: Gary Moeller (6th season)
- MVP: Steve Smith
- Captains: Stefan Humphries; John Lott
- Home stadium: Michigan Stadium

1983 Big Ten Conference football standings
	Conf.					Overall
Team	W		L		T	W		L		T
No. 10 Illinois $	9	–	0	–	0	10	–	2	–	0
No. 8 Michigan	8	–	1	–	0	9	–	3	–	0
No. 14 Iowa	7	–	2	–	0	9	–	3	–	0
No. 9 Ohio State	6	–	3	–	0	9	–	3	–	0
Wisconsin	5	–	4	–	0	7	–	4	–	0
Purdue	3	–	5	–	1	3	–	7	–	1
Michigan State	2	–	6	–	1	4	–	6	–	1
Indiana	2	–	7	–	0	3	–	8	–	0
Northwestern	2	–	7	–	0	2	–	9	–	0
Minnesota	0	–	9	–	0	1	–	10	–	0
$ – Conference champion; Rankings from AP Poll

The 1983 Michigan Wolverines football team was an American football team that represented the University of Michigan in the 1983 Big Ten Conference football season. In their 15th season under head coach Bo Schembechler, the Wolverines compiled a 9–3 record (8–1 against conference opponents), lost to Auburn in the 1984 Sugar Bowl, and outscored all opponents by a total of 355 to 160.

The team's statistical leaders included tailback Rick Rogers with 1,002 rushing yards, quarterback Steve Smith with 1,420 passing yards and 2,087 yards of total offense, Sim Nelson with 494 receiving yards, and placekicker Bob Bergeron with 76 points scored.

Steve Smith was selected as the most valuable player on the Michigan team. Two Michigan offensive linemen, guard Stefan Humphries and center Tom Dixon, received first-team All-America honors. Six Michigan players (Humphries, Dixon, defensive linemen Al Sincich and Kevin Brooks, defensive back Evan Cooper, and placekicker Bob Bergeron) received first-team honors on the 1983 All-Big Ten Conference football team.

Prior to the season, head coach Bo Schembechler delivered the famous "The Team" speech which would go on to become an integral part of Michigan football lore.

== Schedule ==
Date	Time	Opponent	Rank	Site	TV	Result	Attendance
September 10	1:00 p.m.	Washington State*	No. 6	Michigan Stadium; Ann Arbor, MI		W 20–17	103,256
September 17	4:30 p.m.	at No. 16 Washington*	No. 8	Husky Stadium; Seattle, WA	KOMO-TV	L 24–25	60,638
September 24	2:30 p.m.	at Wisconsin	No. 17	Camp Randall Stadium; Madison, WI		W 38–21	77,708
October 1	1:00 p.m.	Indiana	No. 14	Michigan Stadium; Ann Arbor, MI		W 43–18	104,126
October 8	1:00 p.m.	at Michigan State	No. 14	Spartan Stadium; East Lansing, MI (rivalry)		W 42–0	78,033
October 15	1:00 p.m.	Northwestern	No. 13	Michigan Stadium; Ann Arbor, MI (rivalry)		W 35–0	103,914
October 22	12:00 p.m.	No. 12 Iowa^{†}	No. 10	Michigan Stadium; Ann Arbor, MI	ABC	W 16–13	104,559
October 29	12:30 p.m.	at No. 9 Illinois	No. 8	Memorial Stadium; Champaign, IL (rivalry)	CBS	L 6–16	76,127
November 5	1:00 p.m.	Purdue	No. 13	Michigan Stadium; Ann Arbor, MI		W 42–10	104,946
November 12	8:00 p.m.	at Minnesota	No. 9	Hubert H. Humphrey Metrodome; Minneapolis, MN (Little Brown Jug)		W 58–10	40,945
November 19	1:00 p.m.	No. 10 Ohio State	No. 8	Michigan Stadium; Ann Arbor, MI (The Game)	WXYZ-TV	W 24–21	106,115
January 2, 1984	8:00 p.m.	vs. No. 3 Auburn*	No. 8	Louisiana Superdome; New Orleans, LA (Sugar Bowl)	ABC	L 7–9	77,893
*Non-conference game; ^{†}Homecoming; Rankings from AP Poll released prior to the game; All times are in Eastern time

== Game summaries ==
=== Washington State ===
Week 1: Washington State at Michigan

Team	1	2	3	4	Total
Washington State	0	7	3	7	17
• Michigan	7	7	0	6	20

- Date: September 10
- Location: Ann Arbor, MI
- Game attendance: 103,256

Scoring summary
1	10:13	MICH	Eddie Garrett 1-yard pass from David Hall (Todd Schlopy kick)	MICH 7–0
2	14:48	WSU	Joe Taylor 63-yard interception return (John Traut kick)	TIE 7–7
2	8:44	MICH	Rick Rogers 8-yard run (Schlopy kick)	MICH 14–7
3	1:11	WSU	Traut 33-yard field goal	MICH 14–10
4	9:42	WSU	Mayes 2-yard run (Traut kick)	WSU 17–14
4	6:10	MICH	Hall 4-yard run (Schlopy kick missed)	MICH 20–17

On September 10, 1983, Michigan, ranked No. 1 preseason by Sports Illustrated, defeated Washington State, 20–17, before a crowd of 103,256 at Michigan Stadium. The game was played in extreme heat with the temperature reaching 100 degrees on the field. Washington State took a 17–14 lead with 9:42 left in the game after a 63-yard, 11-play drive capped by a two-yard touchdown run. The Wolverines responded with a 75-yard drive that included a 52-yard run by Rick Rogers. Rogers rushed for 124 yards on 19 carries. Quarterback David Hall scored the winning touchdown on a four-yard option run with 6:10 left in the game.

=== At Washington ===
Week 2: Michigan at Washington

Team	1	2	3	4	Total
Michigan	3	0	14	7	24
• Washington	3	7	0	15	25

- Date: September 17
- Location: Seattle
- Game attendance: 60,638
- Television network: KOMO-TV

Scoring summary
1		MICH	Todd Schlopy 35-yard field goal	MICH 3–0
1		UW	Jaeger 33-yar field goal)	TIE 3–3
2		UW	Stransky 19-yard pass from Steve Pelluer (Jaeger kick)	UW 10–3
3		MICH	Rick Rogers 5-yard run (Schlopy kick)	TIE 10–10
3		MICH	Steve Smith 1-yard run (Schlopy kick)	MICH 17–10
4		MICH	Mike Mallory recovered fumble in end zone (Schlopy kick)	MICH 24–10
4		UW	Hunt 3-yard run (Jaeger kick)	MICH 24–17
4	0:34	UW	Mark Pattison 7-yard pass from Pelluer (Larry Michaels pass from Pelluer)	UW 25–24

On September 17, 1983, Michigan lost to Washington, 25–24, before a crowd of 60,638 at Husky Stadium in Seattle. After trailing 24-10 early in the fourth quarter, Washington scored two fourth-quarter touchdowns and successfully passed for a two-point conversion in the final minute of play. Washington quarterback Steve Pelluer completed 15 of 15 passes in the fourth quarter. Todd Schlopy missed what would have been a game-winning 32-yard field goal with four minutes remaining in the game.

=== Wisconsin ===
Week 3: Michigan at Wisconsin

Team	1	2	3	4	Total
• Michigan	7	15	10	6	38
Wisconsin	7	0	0	14	21

- Date: September 24
- Location: Madison, WI
- Game attendance: 77,708

Scoring summary
1	11:41	WIS	Gary Ellerson 9-yard run (Rohde kick)	WIS 7–0
1	1:50	MICH	Rick Rogers 2-yard run (Todd Schlopy kick)	TIE 7–7
2		MICH	Rogers 9-yard run (kick failed)	MICH 13–7
2		MICH	Bob Bergeron 41-yard field goal	MICH 16–7
2	1:13	MICH	Sim Nelson 7-yard pass from Steve Smith (Smith run failed)	MICH 22–7
3	6:53	MICH	Bergeron 37-yard field goal	MICH 25–7
3		MICH	Dan Rice 5-yard run (Bergeron kick)	MICH 32–7
4	12:17	WIS	Marck Harrison 2-yard pass from Randy Wright (Rohde kick)	MICH 32–14
4	7:35	WIS	Mike Jones 32-yard pass from Wright (Rohde kick)	MICH 32–21
4		MICH	Brian Mercer 11-yard run (kick by Bergeron blocked)	MICH 38–21

On September 24, 1983, Michigan defeated Wisconsin, 38–21, before a crowd of 77,708 at Camp Randall Stadium in Madison, Wisconsin. Michigan led, 32–7, at the end of the third quarter before Wisconsin mounted a fourth-quarter comeback. Michigan rushed for 351 yards in the game. Kerry Smith led with 107 yards on 22 carries. Brian Mercer added 64 yards and a touchdown on 10 carries, and Rick Rogers rushed for 59 yards and two touchdowns. The Wolverines passed for only 42 yards on five completions. Steve Smith also threw two interceptions.

=== Indiana ===
Week 4: Indiana at Michigan

Team	1	2	3	4	Total
Indiana	0	11	7	0	18
• Michigan	14	7	9	13	43

- Date: October 1
- Location: Ann Arbor, MI

Scoring summary
1	9:58	MICH	Rick Rogers 35-yard run (Bob Bergeron kick)	MICH 7-0
1	2:27	MICH	Vince Bean 20-yard pass from Steve Smith (Bergeron kick)	MICH 14-0
2	10:54	MICH	Kerry Smith 1-yard run (Bergeron kick)	MICH 21-0
2	8:57	IND	Doug Smith 41-yard field goal	MICH 21-3
2	5:15	IND	Duane Gunn 5-yard pass from Steve Bradley (Gunn pass from Bradley)	MICH 21-11
3	11:00	MICH	Bergeron 37-yard field goal	MICH 24-11
3	7:26	IND	Benson 30-yard pass from Bradley (D. Smith kick)	MICH 24-18
3	3:29	MICH	K. Smith 12-yard run (S. Smith run failed)	MICH 30-18
4	11:42	MICH	K. Smith 18-yard run (pass failed)	MICH 36-18
4	0:33	MICH	Bob Perryman 3-yard run (Bergeron kick)	MICH 43-18

On October 1, 1983, Michigan defeated Indiana, 43–18, before a crowd of 104,126 at Michigan Stadium. Tailback Kerry Smith rushed for three touchdowns. Steve Smith rushed for 130 yards on 14 carries and completed six of 17 passes for 82 yards. Rick Rogers also rushed for 101 yards and a touchdown on 16 carries. Indiana quarterback Steve Bradley passed for 246 yards, but he also gave up four interceptions.

=== Michigan State ===
Week 5: Michigan at Michigan State

Team	1	2	3	4	Total
• Michigan	9	16	3	14	42
Michigan State	0	0	0	0	0

- Date: October 8
- Location: East Lansing, MI
- Game attendance: 78,033

Scoring summary
1	MICH	Milt Carthens 23-yard pass from Steve Smith (kick failed)	MICH 6–0
1	MICH	Bob Bergeron 38-yard field goal	MICH 9–0
2	MICH	Dan Rice 1-yard run (Bergeron kick)	MICH 16–0
2	MICH	Rick Rogers 8-yard run (kick failed)	MICH 22–0
2	MICH	Bergeron 41-yard field goal	MICH 25–0
3	MICH	Bergeron 23-yard field goal	MSU 28–0
4	MICH	Smith 3-yard run (Bergeron kick)	MICH 35–0
4	MICH	Ben Logue 2-yard run (Bergeron kick)	MICH 42–0

On October 8, 1983, Michigan defeated Michigan State, 42–0, before a crowd of 78,033 at Spartan Stadium in East Lansing, Michigan. It was Bo Schembechler's 100th Big Ten coach victory and George Perles' first year as head coach of the Spartans.

=== Northwestern ===
Week 6: Northwestern at Michigan

Team	1	2	3	4	Total
Northwestern	0	0	0	0	0
• Michigan	14	14	7	0	35

- Date: October 15
- Location: Ann Arbor, MI
- Game attendance: 103,914

Scoring summary
1	MICH	Rick Rogers 2-yard run (Bob Bergeron kick)	MICH 7–0
1	MICH	Steve Smith 1-yard run (Bergeron kick)	MICH 14–0
2	MICH	S. Smith 1-yard run (Bergeron kick)	MICH 21–0
2	MICH	Rogers 19-yard run (Bergeron kick)	MICH 28–0
4	MICH	Dan Rice 2-yard pass from S. Smith (Bergeron kick)	MICH 35–0

On October 15, 1983, Michigan defeated Northwestern, 35–0, before a crowd of 103,914 at Michigan Stadium. Rick Rogers scored two rushing touchdowns. Steve Smith also rushed for two touchdown and threw for another on a two-yard pass to Dan Rice.

=== Iowa ===
Week 7: Iowa at Michigan

Team	1	2	3	4	Total
No. 12 Iowa	0	3	0	10	13
• No. 10 Michigan	3	3	7	3	16

- Date: October 22
- Location: Ann Arbor, MI
- Game attendance: 104,559
- Referee: Jim Kimberling (Big Ten)
- TV announcers (ABC): Keith Jackson, Frank Broyles

Scoring summary
1	10:33	MICH	Bob Bergeron 37-yard field goal	MICH 3-0
2	10:05	MICH	Bergeron 20-yard field goal	Michigan 6-0
2	0:53	IOWA	Nichol 56-yard field goal	Michigan 6-3
3	5:56	MICH	Rogers 4-yard run (Bergeron kick)	Michigan 13-3
4	14:48	IOWA	Oljniczak 3-yard pass from Grogan (Nichol kick)	Michigan 13-10
4		IOWA	Nichol 27-yard field goal	Tie 13-13
4	0:08	MICH	Bergeron 45-yard field goal	Michigan 16-13

On October 22, 1983, Michigan, ranked No. 10, defeated No. 12 Iowa, 16–13, before a homecoming crowd of 104,559 at Michigan Stadium. Bob Bergeron kicked three field goals, including the game-winning 45-yard field with eight seconds left in the game. The game-winning drive began when Michigan linebacker Rodney Lyles recovered an Owen Gill fumble with 90 seconds left in the game. Rick Rogers also scored a touchdown on a four-yard run in the third quarter.

=== Illinois ===
Week 8: Michigan at Illinois

Team	1	2	3	4	Total
Michigan	3	0	3	0	6
• Illinois	0	7	0	9	16

- Date: October 29
- Location: Champaign, IL
- Game attendance: 76,127
- Referee: Tom Quinn (Big Ten)
- TV announcers (CBS): Gary Bender and Pat Haden

Scoring summary
1	4:44	MICH	Bob Bergeron 38-yard field goal	MICH 3–0
2	1:50	UI	Thomas Rooks 9-yard pass from Jack Trudeau (Chris White kick)	UI 7–3
3	7:43	MICH	Bergeron 28-yard field goal	UI 7–6
4	14:52	UI	David Williams 46-yard pass from Trudeau (CWhite Kick)	UI 14–6
4	1:22	UI	Safety, Evan Cooper tackled in end zone by Miles after fielding a punt	UI 16–6

On October 29, 1983, Michigan lost to Illinois, 16–6, before a crowd of 76,127 at Memorial Stadium in Champaign, Illinois. It was the first time Illinois had beaten Michigan since 1966. Illinois quarterback Jack Trudeau completed 21 of 37 passes for 271 yards, including touchdown passes of nine yard to Thomas Rooks and 46 yards to David Williams. Steve Smith completed 12 of 25 for 111 yards. Michigan was limited to two field goals by Bob Bergeron. Illinois went on to win the Big Ten championship.

=== Purdue ===
Week 9: Purdue at Michigan

Team	1	2	3	4	Total
Purdue	0	3	0	7	10
• Michigan	14	21	7	0	42

- Date: November 5
- Location: Ann Arbor, MI
- Game attendance: 104,946

Scoring summary
1	MICH	Steve Smith 29-yard run (Bob Bergeron kick)	MICH 7-0
1	MICH	Carlton Rose recovered blocked punt in end zone (Bergeron kick)	Michigan 14-0
2	MICH	Triando Markray 41-yard pass from S. Smith (Bergeron kick)	MICH 21-0
2	PUR	Tim Clark 31-yard field goal	MICH 21-3
2	MICH	Vince Bean 30-yard pass from S. Smith (Bergeron kick)	MICH 28-3
2	MICH	Sim Nelson 18-yard pass from S. Smith (Bergeron kick)	MICH 35-3
3	MICH	Bean 4-yard pass from S. Smith (Bergeron kick)	MICH 42-3
4	PUR	Jeff Price 50-yard pass from Jim Everett (Clark kick)	MICH 42-10

On November 5, 1983, Michigan defeated Purdue, 42–10, before a crowd of 104,946 at Michigan Stadium. Steve Smith completed 11 of 13 passes for 159 yards, and also rushed for 126 yards on 12 carries. Purdue's quarterback Scott Campbell was held to 118 passing yards and was intercepted three times.

=== Minnesota ===
Week 10: Michigan at Minnesota

Team	1	2	3	4	Total
• Michigan	10	31	14	3	58
Minnesota	3	0	0	7	10

- Date: November 12
- Location: Minneapolis

Scoring summary
1	10:08	MINN	Jim Gallery 29-yard field goal	MINN 3-0
1	4:51	MICH	Steve Smith 75-yard run (Bob Bergeron kick)	MICH 7-3
1	0:58	MICH	Bergeron 39-yard field goal	MICH 10-3
2	13:36	MICH	Triando Markray 47-yard pass from S. Smith (Bergeron kick)	MICH 17-3
2	11:10	MICH	S. Smith 20-yard run (Bergeron kick)	Michigan 24-3
2	6:13	MICH	Markray 26-yard pass from S. Smith (Bergeron kick)	Michigan 31-3
2	1:11	MICH	Sim Nelson 8-yard pass from S. Smith (Bergeron kick)	MICH 38-3
2	0:04	MICH	Bergeron 33-yard field goal	MICH 41-3
3	12:19	MICH	S. Smith 50-yard run (Bergeron kick)	MICH 48-3
3	1:59	MICH	Greg Armstrong 1-yard run (Bergeron kick)	MICH 55-3
4	12:39	MICH	Bergeron 51-yard field goal	MICH 58-3
4	9:37	MINN	Dwayne McMullen 5-yard pass from Brett Sadek (Gallery kick)	MICH 58-10

On November 12, 1983, Michigan defeated Minnesota, 58–10, before a crowd of 40,945 at the Hubert H. Humphrey Metrodome in Minneapolis. Despite being pulled early in the third quarter, Steve Smith accounted for six touchdowns (three rushing, three passing) and compiled 327 yards in total offense (147 rushing, 180 passing).

=== Ohio State ===
Week 11: Ohio State at Michigan

Team	1	2	3	4	Total
Ohio State	0	7	7	7	21
• Michigan	10	0	0	14	24

- Date: November 19
- Location: Ann Arbor, MI
- TV announcers (WXYZ-TV): Ray Lane, Jim Brandstatter

Scoring summary
1	8:14	MICH	Bob Bergeron 26-yard field goal	MICH 3-0
1		MICH	Triando Markray 67-yard pass from Steve Smith (Bergeron kick)	MICH 10-0
2		OSU	Keith Byars 1-yard run (Rich Spangler kick)	MICH 10-7
3		OSU	Byars 18-yard run (Spangler kick)	OSU 14-10
4	12:08	MICH	Smith 1-yard run (Bergeron kick)	MICH 17-14
4		MICH	Eric Kattus 8-yard pass from Smith (Bergeron kick)	MICH 24-14
4	1:52	OSU	Cedric Anderson 32-yard pass from Mike Tomczak (Spangler kick)	MICH 24-21

On November 19, 1983, Michigan defeated Ohio State, 24–21, before crowd of 106,115 at Michigan Stadium. Steve Smith ran for a touchdown and passed for two others, a 67-yard completion to Triando Markray in the first quarter and an eight-yarder to tight end Eric Kattus in the fourth quarter. Ohio State turned the ball over four times. Michigan drove to the one-yard line in the second quarter, but the Ohio State defense held, and Michigan missed a field goal attempt on fourth down. The Wolverines trailed at the start of the fourth quarter, but rallied for two touchdowns in the fourth quarter. The go-ahead touchdown followed a Brad Cochran interception at midfield which he returned to Ohio State's 28-yard line.

=== 1984 Sugar Bowl ===
1984 Sugar Bowl

Team	1	2	3	4	Total
• Auburn	0	0	3	6	9
Michigan	7	0	0	0	7

- Date: January 2
- Location: New Orleans
- Game attendance: 77,893
- Game weather: Indoors
- TV announcers (ABC): Keith Jackson, Frank Broyles

Scoring summary
1	MICH	Steve Smith 4-yard run (Bob Bergeron kick)	MICH 7–0
3	AUB	Al Del Greco 31-yard field goal	MICH 7–3
4	AUB	Del Greco 32-yard field goal	MICH 7–6
4	AUB	Del Greco 19-yard field goal	AUB 9–7

On January 2, 1984, Michigan lost to Auburn, 9–7, in the 1984 Sugar Bowl, played before a crowd of 77,893 at the Louisiana Superdome in New Orleans. Michigan took the lead on a four-yard touchdown run by Steve Smith in the first quarter. Michigan was unable to score again, and Auburn came back on three field goals by Al Del Greco. Del Greco's final field goal occurred with 23 seconds remaining in the game. Bo Jackson rushed for 130 yards on 22 carries and was selected as the game's most valuable player.

=== Award season ===
Two Michigan players received first-team honors on the 1983 All-America team:

- Offensive guard Stefan Humphries received first-team honors from the Football Writers Association of America, United Press International, and The Sporting News. He also received second-team honors from the Associated Press, Gannett News Service, and Newspaper Enterprise Association.
- Center Tom Dixon received first-team honors from the American Football Coaches Association, Associated Press, and The Sporting News.

Six Michigan players received first-team honors from the Associated Press (AP) and/or United Press International (UPI) on the 1983 All-Big Ten Conference football team: offensive guard Stefan Humphries (AP-1, UPI-1), center Tom Dixon (AP-1, UPI-1), placekicker Bob Bergeron (AP-1), defensive lineman Kevin Brooks (AP-2, UPI-1), defensive lineman Al Sincich (AP-1, UPI-2), and defensive back Evan Cooper (AP-1, UPI-2). Four others received second-team honors: linebacker Mike Mallory (AP-2, UPI-2); linebacker Carlton Rose (AP-2, UPI-2); running back Rick Rogers (UPI-2); and offensive guard Jerry Diorio (AP-2).

Team awards were presented as follows:

- Most Valuable Player: Steve Smith
- Meyer Morton Award: Steve Smith
- John Maulbetsch Award: Bob Perryman
- Frederick Matthei Award: Al Sincich
- Arthur Robinson Scholarship Award: Stefan Humphries
- Dick Katcher Award: Carlton Rose
- Robert P. Ufer Award: Jeff Cohen

== Personnel ==
=== Offense ===
- Greg Armstrong, fullback, senior, Middletown, Ohio - started 4 games at fullback
- Art Balourdos, center, junior, Chicago, Illinois
- Vincent Bean, split end, senior, Southfield, Michigan - started all 12 games at split end
- Milt Carthens, tight end, senior, Pontiac, Michigan
- Dan Decker, quarterback, sophomore, Roseville, Michigan
- Jerry Diorio, offensive guard, senior, Youngstown, Ohio - started all 12 games at left offensive guard
- Tom Dixon, center, senior, Fort Wayne, Indiana - started all 12 games at center
- Jumbo Elliott, offensive tackle, freshman, Lake Ronkonkoma, New York
- Eddie Garrett, fullback, sophomore, Milwaukee, Wisconsin - started 6 games at fullback
- David Hall, quarterback, senior, Livonia, Michigan - started 1 game at quarterback
- Mark Hammerstein, offensive line, sophomore, Wapakoneta, Ohio
- Jim Harbaugh, quarterback, sophomore, Palo Alto, California
- Ken Higgins, wide receiver, freshman, Battle Creek, Michigan - started 1 game at flanker
- Stefan Humphries, offensive guard, senior, Broward, Florida - started all 12 games at right offensive guard
- Jerald Ingram, fullback, senior, Beaver, Pennsylvania
- Doug James, offensive guard, senior, Louisville, Kentucky - started all 12 games at right offensive tackle
- Gilvanni Johnson, wide receiver, sophomore, Detroit, Michigan - started 4 games at flanker
- Eric Kattus, tight end, junior, Cincinnati, Ohio
- Ben Logue, running back, sophomore, Atlanta, Georgia
- Triando Markray, wide receiver, sophomore, Detroit, Michigan - started 7 games at flanker
- Brian Mercer, tailback, junior, Cincinnati, Ohio
- Clay Miller, offensive tackle, junior, Norman, Oklahoma - started all 12 games at left offensive tackle
- Sim Nelson, tight end, junior, Fort Wayne, Indiana - started all 12 games at tight end
- Bob Perryman, running back, sophomore, Buzzards Bay, Massachusetts
- Dan Rice, running back, sophomore, Roxbury, Massachusetts - started 2 games at fullback
- Rick Rogers, running back, junior, Inkster, Michigan - started 11 games at tailback
- Kerry Smith, running back, senior, Grand Rapids, Michigan - started 1 game at tailback
- Steve Smith, quarterback, senior, Grand Blanc, Michigan - started 09 games at quarterback
- Larry Sweeney, center, senior, Alma, Michigan
- Gerald White, running back, freshman, Titusville, Florida
- Thomas Wilcher, tailback, sophomore, Detroit, Michigan
- Dan Yarano, offensive guard, senior, Zanesville, Ohio

=== Defense ===
- Jeffery Akers, outside linebacker, junior, Lynn, Massachusetts
- Timothy Anderson, inside linebacker, junior, Ann Arbor, Michigan - started 6 games at inside linebacker
- Mike Boren, inside linebacker, senior, Columbus, Ohio - started 4 games at inside linebacker
- Kevin Brooks, defensive tackle, junior, Detroit, Michigan - started all 12 games at defensive tackle
- Fritz Burgess, defensive back, senior, Pasadena, California
- Brad Cochran, defensive back, junior, Royal Oak, Michigan - started all 12 games at strong-side cornerback
- Jeff Cohen, defensive back, senior, Farmington Hills, Michigan
- Evan Cooper, defensive back, senior, Miami, Florida - started all 12 games (8 at strong safety, 4 at free safety)
- Vincent DeFelice, defensive tackle, senior, Trenton, Michigan - started 11 games at defensive tackle
- John Ferens, defensive back, senior, Toledo, Ohio
- Tony Gant, linebacker, sophomore, Fremont, Ohio - started 8 games at free safety
- Joe Gray, linebacker, junior, Detroit, Michigan
- Mike Hammerstein, defensive tackle, junior, Wapakoneta, Ohio - started 1 game at defensive tackle
- Thomas J. Hassel, outside linebacker, senior, Cincinnati, Ohio - started 6 games at outside linebacker
- Dieter Heren, defensive back, sophomore, Fort Wayne, Indiana
- Jim Herrmann, inside linebacker, senior, Dearborn Heights, Michigan
- Rich Hewlett, defensive back, senior, Plymouth, Michigan - started 4 games at strong safety
- John Lott, defensive back, senior, Masury, Ohio - started all 12 games at weak-side cornerback
- Rodney Lyles, outside linebacker, senior, Miami, Florida - started 11 games at outside linebacker
- Doug Mallory, defensive back, freshman, DeKalb, Illinois
- Mike Mallory, inside linebacker, junior, DeKalb, Illinois - started all 12 games at inside linebacker
- Dave Meredith, defensive tackle, senior, Sterling Heights, Michigan
- Andy Moeller, inside linebacker, sophomore, Ann Arbor, Michigan
- Mike Reinhold, inside linebacker, sophomore, Muskegon, Michigan - started 2 games at inside linebacker
- Garland Rivers, defensive back, freshman, Canton, Ohio
- Nathaniel Rodgers, middle guard, senior, Warren, Ohio
- Carlton Rose, outside linebacker, senior, Ft. Lauderdale, Florida - started 6 games at outside linebacker
- James Scarcelli, outside linebacker, junior, Warren, Michigan - started 1 game at outside linebacker
- Alan Sincich, middle guard, junior, Cleveland, Ohio - started all 12 games at middle guard
- Michael Wilson, defensive tackle, senior, Detroit, Michigan

=== Kickers ===
- Bob Bergeron, place-kicker, senior, Fort Wayne, Indiana
- Don Bracken, punter, senior, Thermopolis, Wyoming
- Todd Schlopy, place-kicker, senior, Orchard Park, New York

=== Professional football ===
Fifteen members of the 1983 football team went on to play professional football.

- Don Bracken (Green Bay Packers 1985–90, Los Angeles Rams 1992-93)
- Kevin Brooks (Dallas Cowboys 1985–88, Detroit Lions 1989-90)
- Milt Carthens (Indianapolis Colts 1987)
- Evan Cooper (Philadelphia Eagles 1984–87, Atlanta Falcons, 1988-89)
- Jerry Diorio (Detroit Lions 1987)
- Jumbo Elliott (New York Giants 1988–95, New York Jets 1996–2000, 2002)
- Mike Hammerstein (Cincinnati Bengals 1986-90)
- Jim Harbaugh (Chicago Bears 1987–1993, Indianapolis Colts 1994–1997, Baltimore Ravens 1998, San Diego Chargers 1999–2000, Carolina Panthers 2001)
- Stefan Humphries (Chicago Bears 1984–86, Denver Broncos 1987-88)
- Eric Kattus (Cincinnati Bengals 1986–91, New York Jets 1992)
- Bob Perryman (New England Patriots 1987–90, Denver Broncos 1991-92)
- Garland Rivers (Chicago Bears 1987, Albany Firebirds 1990–91, Arizona Rattlers 1992–93)
- Carlton Rose (Washington Redskins 1987)
- Gerald White (Dallas Cowboys 1987)

=== Coaching staff ===
- Head coach: Bo Schembechler
- Assistant coaches:

- Gary Moeller - assistant head coach and defensive coordinator
- Lloyd Carr - defensive backfield coach
- Milan Vooletich - linebackers coach
- Jerry Meter - defensive line coach
- Jerry Hanlon - quarterbacks coach
- Tirrel Burton - running backs coach
- Bob Thornbladh - wide receivers coach
- Elliot Uzelac - offensive line coach
- Paul Schudel - offensive interior line coach
- Alex Agase
- Bob Chmiel

- Trainer: Russ Miller
- Manager: Paul Gehkas, Douglans Ham, Kenneth Pefkins, Robert Reid

== Statistics ==
=== Rushing ===
Player	Att	Net Yards	Yds/Att	TD
Rick Rogers	209	1002	4.8	9
Steve Smith	103	667	6.5	10
Kerry Smith	98	517	5.3	3
Eddie Garrett	85	353	4.2	0
Brian Mercer	30	151	5.0	1
Dan Rice	35	140	4.0	2
Greg Armstrong	20	91	4.6	1

=== Passing ===
Player	Att	Comp	Int	Comp %	Yds	Yds/Comp	TD
Steve Smith	206	106	8	51.7	1420	13.4	13
David Hall	25	13	2	52.0	118	9.1	1
Jim Harbaugh	5	2	0	40.0	26	13.0	0

=== Receiving ===
Player	Recp	Yds	Yds/Recp	TD
Sim Nelson	41	494	12.0	3
Vince Bean	29	407	14.0	3
Triando Markray	11	319	29.0	4
Rick Rogers	16	137	8.6	0

=== Scoring ===
Player	TDs	XPM	FGM	Points
Bob Bergeron	0	31	15	76
Steve Smith	10	0	0	60
Rick Rogers	9	0	0	54
Triando Markray	4	0	0	24
