= List of Michigan Wolverines in the NFL draft =

This is a list of Michigan Wolverines football players selected in the NFL draft.

== Key ==
B	Back	K	Kicker	NT	Nose tackle
C	Center	LB	Linebacker	FB	Fullback
DB	Defensive back	P	Punter	HB	Halfback
DE	Defensive end	QB	Quarterback	WR	Wide receiver
DT	Defensive tackle	RB	Running back	G	Guard
E	End	T	Offensive tackle	TE	Tight end

= Pro Bowler
= MVP
= Hall of Famer

== Selections ==
Year	Round	Pick	Overall	Player	Team	Position
1937	9	5	85	Matt Patanelli	Pittsburgh Steelers	E
1939	12	5	105	Ralph Heikkinen	Brooklyn Dodgers	G
1939	19	9	179	John Brennan	Green Bay Packers	G
1940	17	9	159	Archie Kodros	Green Bay Packers	C
1941	1	1	1	Tom Harmon	Chicago Bears	RB
1941	1	10	10	Forest Evashevski	Washington Redskins	QB
1941	5	7	37	Ed Frutig	Green Bay Packers	E
1941	10	2	82	Ralph Fritz	Pittsburgh Steelers	G
1942	1	5	5	Bob Westfall	Detroit Lions	FB
1942	8	9	69	Joe Rogers	Green Bay Packers	E
1942	18	9	169	Bob Ingalls	Green Bay Packers	C
1943	1	7	7	Bill Daley	Pitt-Phil Steagles	FB
1943	3	4	19	George Ceithaml	Brooklyn Dodgers	QB
1943	5	2	32	Al Wistert	Philadelphia Eagles	T
1943	12	1	101	Robert Kolesar	Detroit Lions	G
1944	1	7	7	Merv Pregulman	Green Bay Packers	G
1944	3	6	22	Tom Kuzma	Green Bay Packers	RB
1944	3	8	24	Rudy Smeja	Chicago Bears	E
1944	5	3	35	John Greene	Detroit Lions	E
1944	11	3	101	Paul White	Detroit Lions	RB
1944	14	3	134	Bill Pritula	Detroit Lions	T
1944	29	3	299	Robert Derleth	Detroit Lions	T
1945	1	5	5	Elroy Hirsch	Cleveland Rams	B
1945	1	7	7	Don Lund	Chicago Bears	FB
1945	2	5	16	Milan Lazetich	Cleveland Rams	T
1945	5	7	39	Bob Wiese	Detroit Lions	FB
1945	7	5	59	Fred Negus	Cleveland Rams	LB/C
1945	30	7	314	Don Robinson	Chicago Bears	B
1946	3	6	21	Bob Nussbaumer	Green Bay Packers	E
1946	7	6	56	Art Renner	Green Bay Packers	E
1946	8	3	63	Joseph Ponsetto	Pittsburgh Steelers	QB
1946	17	9	159	Mike Prashaw	Washington Redskins	T
1947	5	1	26	Bob Chappuis	Detroit Lions	B
1947	10	1	76	Bump Elliott	Detroit Lions	B
1947	16	8	143	Ralph Chubb	Los Angeles Rams	B
1947	20	1	176	Elmer Madar	Detroit Lions	E
1947	21	1	186	J. T. White	Detroit Lions	C
1947	21	9	194	Joseph Ponsetto	New York Giants	QB
1947	31	4	289	Bob Callahan	Chicago Cardinals	C
1948	6	3	38	Jack Weisenburger	Washington Redskins	FB
1948	12	2	97	Jim Brieske	New York Giants	K
1948	14	8	123	Dick Kempthorn	Philadelphia Eagles	FB
1948	15	2	127	Pete Elliott	Detroit Lions	QB
1948	15	7	132	Dick Rifenburg	Philadelphia Eagles	E
1948	17	2	147	Quentin Sickels	Detroit Lions	G
1948	17	8	153	Ralph Kohl	Philadelphia Eagles	T
1948	30	8	283	Bruce Hilkene	Pittsburgh Steelers	T
1949	2	4	15	Dan Dworsky	Green Bay Packers	C
1949	9	5	86	Joe Soboleski	New York Giants	G
1949	9	7	88	Ed McNeill	Washington Redskins	E
1949	15	4	145	Ed Sobczak	Pittsburgh Steelers	E
1949	16	8	159	Robert Wahl	Chicago Bears	T
1949	17	5	166	Wally Teninga	New York Giants	RB
1949	24	1	232	Oswald Clark	Detroit Lions	E
1950	10	10	128	Robert Wahl	Chicago Bears	T
1951	2	6	20	Chuck Ortmann	Pittsburgh Steelers	B
1951	5	9	59	Tony Momsen	Los Angeles Rams	LB
1951	9	1	99	Dick McWilliams	Green Bay Packers	T
1951	12	1	136	Carl Kreager	Green Bay Packers	C
1951	17	10	205	Don Dufek Sr.	Chicago Bears	FB
1951	27	7	322	Harry Allis	Detroit Lions	K
1952	6	2	63	Tom Johnson	Green Bay Packers	T
1952	17	3	196	Don Peterson	Green Bay Packers	RB
1953	5	6	55	Roger Zatkoff	Green Bay Packers	LB
1953	8	5	90	Lowell Perry	Pittsburgh Steelers	E
1953	15	12	181	Ted Topor	Detroit Lions	LB
1953	22	8	261	Laurie LeClair	Philadelphia Eagles	LB
1954	10	2	111	Gene Knutson	Green Bay Packers	DE
1954	13	3	148	Bob Topp	New York Giants	E
1954	29	7	344	Ted Kress	Washington Redskins	RB
1955	12	4	137	Art Walker	Green Bay Packers	T
1955	14	4	161	Fred Baer	Green Bay Packers	FB
1955	20	2	231	Ron Geyer	Washington Redskins	T
1955	26	11	312	Duncan McDonald	Detroit Lions	QB
1956	10	2	111	Lou Baldacci	Pittsburgh Steelers	RB
1956	23	4	269	Tony Branoff	Chicago Cardinals	RB
1956	28	11	336	John Morrow	Los Angeles Rams	T
1957	1	4	4	Ron Kramer	Green Bay Packers	E
1957	2	9	22	Tom Maentz	Chicago Cardinals	E
1957	3	11	36	Terry Barr	Detroit Lions	WR
1957	7	9	82	Mike Rotunno	Cleveland Browns	C
1957	21	1	242	Charley Brooks	Philadelphia Eagles	E
1957	25	12	301	Jerry Goebel	New York Giants	C
1957	28	1	326	Clem Corona	Philadelphia Eagles	G
1958	1	8	8	Jim Pace	San Francisco 49ers	RB
1958	5	5	54	Jim Van Pelt	Washington Redskins	QB
1958	28	6	331	Gordy Morrow	Los Angeles Rams	E
1959	4	1	37	Gary Prahst	Cleveland Browns	E
1959	8	3	87	Bob Ptacek	Cleveland Browns	QB
1959	8	10	94	Willie Smith	Chicago Bears	T
1959	11	4	124	Jerry Marciniak	Washington Redskins	G
1959	21	12	252	John Herrnstein	Baltimore Colts	FB
1960	15	3	171	Darrell Harper	Detroit Lions	RB
1961	15	3	199	Bob Johnson	Washington Redskins	E
1962	2	7	21	Bennie McRae	Chicago Bears	DB
1962	5	7	63	Bill Tunnicliff	Chicago Bears	FB
1962	5	14	70	Jon Schopf	Green Bay Packers	T
1962	8	4	102	Ken Tureaud	Dallas Cowboys	FB
1962	9	10	122	Todd Grant	Detroit Lions	C
1962	14	5	187	George Mans	St. Louis Cardinals	E
1962	20	10	276	Bob Brown	Detroit Lions	E
1963	9	9	121	Dave Raimey	Cleveland Browns	DB
1964	3	12	40	Joe O'Donnell	Green Bay Packers	G
1964	4	11	53	Tom Keating	Minnesota Vikings	DT
1964	15	11	207	John Houtman	Cleveland Browns	T
1965	3	5	33	Bob Timberlake	New York Giants	QB
1965	5	7	63	John Henderson	Philadelphia Eagles	WR
1965	6	2	72	Arnie Simkus	Cleveland Browns	DT
1965	16	13	223	Mel Anthony	Cleveland Browns	FB
1966	1	2	2	Tom Mack	Los Angeles Rams	G
1966	5	7	71	Steve Smith	San Francisco 49ers	WR
1966	5	9	73	Jack Clancy	St. Louis Cardinals	WR
1966	18	12	272	Charley Kines	Chicago Bears	T
1967	1	20	20	Jim Detwiler	Baltimore Colts	RB
1967	2	19	45	Rick Volk	Baltimore Colts	DB
1967	3	9	62	Frank Nunley	San Francisco 49ers	LB
1967	3	25	78	John Rowser	Green Bay Packers	DB
1967	4	3	83	Carl Ward	Cleveland Browns	RB
1967	12	24	314	Mike Bass	Green Bay Packers	DB
1968	5	12	123	Rocky Rosema	St. Louis Cardinals	LB
1968	7	4	169	Ray Phillips	New Orleans Saints	G
1968	9	19	238	Dave Porter	Cleveland Browns	DT
1969	1	20	20	Ron Johnson	Cleveland Browns	RB
1969	3	16	68	Tom Stincic	Dallas Cowboys	LB
1969	14	8	346	George Hoey	Detroit Lions	DB
1970	2	3	29	Jim Mandich	Miami Dolphins	TE
1970	5	16	120	Cecil Pryor	Green Bay Packers	DE
1970	5	23	127	Barry Pierson	St. Louis Cardinals	DB
1970	14	5	343	Garvie Craw	Boston Patriots	RB
1970	14	18	356	Tom Curtis	Baltimore Colts	DB
1970	17	25	441	Brian Healy	Minnesota Vikings	DB
1971	2	17	43	Dan Dierdorf	St. Louis Cardinals	T
1971	3	14	66	Paul Staroba	Cleveland Browns	WR
1971	5	21	125	Pete Newell	Detroit Lions	DT
1971	5	23	127	Marty Huff	San Francisco 49ers	LB
1971	6	2	132	Don Moorhead	New Orleans Saints	QB
1971	10	6	240	Jim Betts	New York Jets	DB
1971	14	6	344	Jack Harpring	New York Jets	T
1972	1	18	18	Thom Darden	Cleveland Browns	DB
1972	1	20	20	Mike Taylor	New York Jets	LB
1972	2	1	27	Reggie McKenzie	Buffalo Bills	G
1972	2	21	47	Glenn Doughty	Baltimore Colts	WR
1972	3	5	57	Tom Beckman	St. Louis Cardinals	DE
1972	3	12	64	Mike Keller	Dallas Cowboys	DE
1972	5	5	109	Billy Taylor	Atlanta Falcons	RB
1972	10	21	255	Mike Oldham	Washington Redskins	WR
1972	16	6	396	Guy Murdock	Houston Oilers	C
1972	17	3	419	Fritz Seyferth	New York Giants	FB
1973	1	7	7	Paul Seymour	Buffalo Bills	TE
1973	3	3	55	Randy Logan	Philadelphia Eagles	DB
1973	4	26	104	Bo Rather	Miami Dolphins	WR
1973	5	16	120	Fred Grambau	Kansas City Chiefs	DE
1973	13	23	335	Clinton Spearman	Los Angeles Rams	DT
1973	16	5	395	Bill Hart	Chicago Bears	C
1974	1	20	20	Dave Gallagher	Chicago Bears	DT
1974	2	10	36	Paul Seal	New Orleans Saints	TE
1974	2	11	37	Ed Shuttlesworth	Baltimore Colts	FB
1974	4	5	83	Clint Haslerig	San Francisco 49ers	WR
1974	7	17	173	Jim Coode	Atlanta Falcons	T
1974	10	12	246	Doug Troszak	Green Bay Packers	DT
1974	11	15	275	Bob Thornbladh	Kansas City Chiefs	FB
1974	14	9	347	Walt Williamson	San Francisco 49ers	DE
1974	15	9	373	Larry Cipa	New Orleans Saints	QB
1974	16	8	398	Don Coleman	New Orleans Saints	LB
1975	1	28	28	Dave Brown	Pittsburgh Steelers	DB
1975	6	14	144	Dennis Franklin	Detroit Lions	WR
1975	7	10	166	Gil Chapman	Buffalo Bills	RB
1975	7	19	175	Harry Banks	Buffalo Bills	DB
1975	8	5	187	Greg DenBoer	Baltimore Colts	TE
1975	9	11	219	Steve Strinko	Detroit Lions	LB
1975	10	7	241	Chuck Heater	New Orleans Saints	RB
1975	11	19	279	Tom Drake	Buffalo Bills	DB
1975	13	3	315	Carl Russ	Atlanta Falcons	LB
1976	4	12	104	Gordon Bell	New York Giants	RB
1976	4	17	109	Dan Jilek	Buffalo Bills	LB
1976	5	2	126	Don Dufek	Seattle Seahawks	DB
1976	5	5	129	Steve King	New York Jets	T
1976	9	15	252	Jim Czirr	Denver Broncos	C
1976	10	3	268	Jeff Perlinger	San Diego Chargers	DT
1976	13	17	364	Wayman Britt	Washington Redskins	DB
1977	2	17	45	Rob Lytle	Denver Broncos	RB
1977	3	19	75	Jim Smith	Pittsburgh Steelers	WR
1977	6	24	163	Calvin O'Neal	Baltimore Colts	LB
1977	8	2	197	Greg Morton	Buffalo Bills	DT
1977	9	26	249	Jerry Vogele	New England Patriots	LB
1977	10	5	256	John Hennessy	New York Jets	DE
1978	1	13	13	Mike Kenn	Atlanta Falcons	T
1978	1	26	26	John Anderson	Green Bay Packers	LB
1978	2	19	47	Walt Downing	San Francisco 49ers	G
1978	6	12	150	Dwight Hicks	Detroit Lions	DB
1978	11	16	294	Mark Donahue	Cincinnati Bengals	G
1979	1	24	24	Jon Giesler	Miami Dolphins	T
1979	4	4	86	Russell Davis	Pittsburgh Steelers	FB
1979	5	1	111	Tom Seabron	San Francisco 49ers	LB
1979	5	10	120	Harlan Huckleby	New Orleans Saints	RB
1979	5	19	129	Jerry Meter	Minnesota Vikings	LB
1979	5	22	132	Rick Leach	Denver Broncos	QB
1979	6	12	149	Bill Dufek	New York Jets	G
1980	1	6	6	Curtis Greer	St. Louis Cardinals	DE
1980	2	5	33	Doug Marsh	St. Louis Cardinals	TE
1980	2	19	47	Ralph Clayton	New York Jets	WR
1980	4	13	96	Mike Jolly	New Orleans Saints	DB
1980	5	21	131	Mike Harden	Denver Broncos	DB
1980	7	2	167	Ron Simpkins	Cincinnati Bengals	LB
1981	1	9	9	Mel Owens	Los Angeles Rams	LB
1981	4	24	101	George Lilja	Los Angeles Rams	C
1981	8	4	197	John Powers	New York Giants	G
1981	10	16	264	Andy Cannavino	Detroit Lions	LB
1982	1	18	18	Butch Woolfolk	New York Giants	RB
1982	2	2	29	Bubba Paris	San Francisco 49ers	T
1982	3	17	72	Stan Edwards	Houston Oilers	RB
1982	4	8	91	Ed Muransky	Los Angeles Raiders	T
1982	4	18	101	Brian Carpenter	Dallas Cowboys	DB
1982	6	7	146	Kurt Becker	Chicago Bears	G
1982	7	27	194	Ben Needham	Cincinnati Bengals	LB
1983	2	12	40	Rich Strenger	Detroit Lions	T
1983	2	14	42	Keith Bostic	Houston Oilers	DB
1983	8	2	198	Robert Thompson	Houston Oilers	LB
1983	8	22	218	Craig Dunaway	Pittsburgh Steelers	TE
1983	8	24	220	Lawrence Ricks	Dallas Cowboys	RB
1983	9	13	237	Ali Haji-Sheikh	New York Giants	K
1983	12	27	334	Anthony Carter	Miami Dolphins	WR
1984	3	15	71	Stefan Humphries	Chicago Bears	G
1984	4	4	88	Evan Cooper	Philadelphia Eagles	DB
1984u	2	5	33	Steve Smith	San Diego Chargers	QB
1984u	2	24	52	Tom Dixon	Pittsburgh Steelers	C
1985	1	17	17	Kevin Brooks	Dallas Cowboys	DE
1986	3	10	65	Mike Hammerstein	Cincinnati Bengals	DT
1986	3	25	80	Brad Cochran	Los Angeles Raiders	DB
1986	4	9	91	Eric Kattus	Cincinnati Bengals	TE
1986	12	1	106	Clay Miller	Tampa Bay Buccaneers	G
1987	1	26	26	Jim Harbaugh	Chicago Bears	QB
1987	3	23	79	Bob Perryman	New England Patriots	FB
1987	4	8	92	Garland Rivers	Detroit Lions	DB
1987	5	22	134	Paul Jokisch	San Francisco 49ers	WR
1987	9	3	226	Thomas Wilcher	San Diego Chargers	RB
1988	2	9	36	Jumbo Elliott	New York Giants	T
1988	4	25	107	Monte Robbins	Tampa Bay Buccaneers	P
1988	4	27	109	Jamie Morris	Washington Redskins	RB
1989	4	25	109	John Kolesar	Buffalo Bills	WR
1989	5	6	118	David Arnold	Pittsburgh Steelers	CB
1989	6	22	161	Mark Messner	Los Angeles Rams	DT
1990	2	20	45	Leroy Hoard	Cleveland Browns	RB
1990	3	27	80	Greg McMurtry	New England Patriots	WR
1990	4	16	97	Chris Calloway	Pittsburgh Steelers	WR
1990	6	26	163	Derrick Walker	San Diego Chargers	TE
1990	11	8	284	Brent White	Chicago Bears	DE
1991	1	27	27	Jarrod Bunch	New York Giants	FB
1991	5	1	112	Jon Vaughn	New England Patriots	RB
1991	6	1	140	David Key	New England Patriots	DB
1991	7	13	180	Tripp Welborne	Minnesota Vikings	DB
1991	8	17	212	Dean Dingman	Pittsburgh Steelers	G
1991	8	23	218	Tom Dohring	Kansas City Chiefs	T
1991	11	13	291	Tony Boles	Dallas Cowboys	RB
1992	1	4	4	Desmond Howard	Washington Redskins	WR
1992	2	4	32	Greg Skrepenak	Los Angeles Raiders	T
1992	4	17	101	Mike Evans	Kansas City Chiefs	DE
1992	7	18	186	Erick Anderson	Kansas City Chiefs	LB
1992	11	1	281	Brian Townsend	Los Angeles Rams	LB
1992	12	28	336	Matt Elliott	Washington Redskins	C
1993	1	14	14	Steve Everitt	Cleveland Browns	C
1993	2	8	35	Tony McGee	Cincinnati Bengals	TE
1993	3	8	64	Joe Cocozzo	San Diego Chargers	G
1993	4	26	110	Corwin Brown	New England Patriots	DB
1993	8	21	217	Doug Skene	Philadelphia Eagles	T
1993	8	23	219	Elvis Grbac	San Francisco 49ers	QB
1994	1	29	29	Derrick Alexander	Cleveland Browns	WR
1995	1	17	17	Tyrone Wheatley	New York Giants	RB
1995	1	23	23	Ty Law	New England Patriots	DB
1995	1	31	31	Trezelle Jenkins	Kansas City Chiefs	T
1995	2	13	45	Todd Collins	Buffalo Bills	QB
1995	5	4	138	Matt Dyson	Oakland Raiders	LB
1996	1	8	8	Tim Biakabutuka	Carolina Panthers	RB
1996	2	4	34	Amani Toomer	New York Giants	WR
1996	4	14	109	Jon Runyan	Houston Oilers	T
1996	5	4	136	Mercury Hayes	New Orleans Saints	WR
1996	7	35	244	Jay Riemersma	Buffalo Bills	TE
1997	3	16	76	Rod Payne	Cincinnati Bengals	C
1997	4	1	97	Damon Denson	New England Patriots	G
1997	7	16	217	William Carr	Cincinnati Bengals	DT
1998	1	4	4	Charles Woodson	Oakland Raiders	DB
1998	3	20	81	Chris Floyd	New England Patriots	FB
1998	3	30	91	Brian Griese	Denver Broncos	QB
1998	4	13	105	Glen Steele	Cincinnati Bengals	DE
1998	5	30	153	Chris Howard	Denver Broncos	RB
1999	2	6	37	Jon Jansen	Washington Redskins	T
1999	5	3	136	Jerame Tuman	Pittsburgh Steelers	TE
1999	6	2	171	Tai Streets	San Francisco 49ers	WR
1999	6	36	205	Andre Weathers	New York Giants	DB
2000	2	9	40	Ian Gold	Denver Broncos	LB
2000	4	16	110	Aaron Shea	Cleveland Browns	TE
2000	4	28	122	Josh Williams	Indianapolis Colts	DT
2000	6	11	177	Dhani Jones	New York Giants	LB
2000	6	33	199	Tom Brady	New England Patriots	QB
2000	7	29	235	Rob Renes	Indianapolis Colts	DT
2001	1	8	8	David Terrell	Chicago Bears	WR
2001	1	17	17	Steve Hutchinson	Seattle Seahawks	G
2001	1	18	18	Jeff Backus	Detroit Lions	T
2001	2	7	38	Anthony Thomas	Chicago Bears	RB
2001	2	12	43	Maurice Williams	Jacksonville Jaguars	T
2002	3	21	86	Marquise Walker	Tampa Bay Buccaneers	WR
2002	4	30	128	Larry Foote	Pittsburgh Steelers	LB
2002	5	19	154	Jonathan Goodwin	New York Jets	G
2002	7	37	248	Hayden Epstein	Jacksonville Jaguars	K
2003	2	9	41	Bennie Joppru	Houston Texans	TE
2003	2	21	53	Victor Hobson	New York Jets	LB
2003	3	21	85	B. J. Askew	New York Jets	FB
2003	6	19	192	Drew Henson	Houston Texans	QB
2003	6	25	198	Cato June	Indianapolis Colts	LB
2003	7	26	240	Charles Drake	New York Giants	DB
2004	1	26	26	Chris Perry	Cincinnati Bengals	RB
2004	3	22	85	Jeremy LeSueur	Denver Broncos	DB
2004	7	1	202	John Navarre	Arizona Cardinals	QB
2004	7	20	221	Tony Pape	Miami Dolphins	G
2005	1	3	3	Braylon Edwards	Cleveland Browns	WR
2005	1	29	29	Marlin Jackson	Indianapolis Colts	DB
2005	2	1	33	David Baas	San Francisco 49ers	C
2006	4	10	107	Gabe Watson	Arizona Cardinals	DT
2006	4	12	109	Jason Avant	Philadelphia Eagles	WR
2006	7	36	244	Tim Massaquoi	Tampa Bay Buccaneers	TE
2007	1	18	18	Leon Hall	Cincinnati Bengals	DB
2007	2	1	33	Alan Branch	Arizona Cardinals	DT
2007	2	14	46	LaMarr Woodley	Pittsburgh Steelers	LB
2007	2	15	47	David Harris	New York Jets	LB
2007	5	5	142	Steve Breaston	Arizona Cardinals	WR
2007	6	33	207	Prescott Burgess	Baltimore Ravens	LB
2007	7	6	216	Tyler Ecker	Washington Redskins	TE
2008	1	1	1	Jake Long	Miami Dolphins	T
2008	2	26	57	Chad Henne	Miami Dolphins	QB
2008	3	15	78	Shawn Crable	New England Patriots	LB
2008	3	32	95	Mario Manningham	New York Giants	WR
2008	6	36	202	Mike Hart	Indianapolis Colts	RB
2008	7	30	237	Adrian Arrington	New Orleans Saints	WR
2009	4	36	136	Terrance Taylor	Indianapolis Colts	DT
2009	6	6	179	Morgan Trent	Cincinnati Bengals	DB
2010	1	13	13	Brandon Graham	Philadelphia Eagles	LB
2010	5	19	150	Zoltán Meskó	New England Patriots	P
2010	7	44	251	Stevie Brown	Oakland Raiders	DB
2011	2	29	61	Jonas Mouton	San Diego Chargers	LB
2011	6	36	201	Stephen Schilling	San Diego Chargers	G
2012	3	19	82	Mike Martin	Tennessee Titans	DT
2012	7	19	226	David Molk	San Diego Chargers	C
2012	7	31	238	Junior Hemingway	Kansas City Chiefs	WR
2013	5	2	135	Denard Robinson	Jacksonville Jaguars	WR
2013	6	10	178	William Campbell	New York Jets	G
2014	1	11	11	Taylor Lewan	Tennessee Titans	T
2014	3	31	95	Michael Schofield	Denver Broncos	T
2014	7	29	244	Jeremy Gallon	New England Patriots	WR
2015	2	9	41	Devin Funchess	Carolina Panthers	WR
2015	2	31	63	Frank Clark	Seattle Seahawks	DE
2015	4	30	129	Jake Ryan	Green Bay Packers	LB
2016	3	33	95	Graham Glasgow	Detroit Lions	C
2016	4	34	132	Willie Henry	Baltimore Ravens	DT
2016	6	16	191	Jake Rudock	Detroit Lions	QB
2017	1	25	25	Jabrill Peppers	Cleveland Browns	DB
2017	1	28	28	Taco Charlton	Dallas Cowboys	DE
2017	3	10	74	Chris Wormley	Baltimore Ravens	DE
2017	3	28	92	Jourdan Lewis	Dallas Cowboys	DB
2017	3	31	95	Lano Hill	Seattle Seahawks	DB
2017	3	42	106	Amara Darboh	Seattle Seahawks	WR
2017	4	14	120	Ben Gedeon	Minnesota Vikings	LB
2017	4	32	138	Ryan Glasgow	Cincinnati Bengals	DT
2017	4	33	139	Jehu Chesson	Kansas City Chiefs	WR
2017	5	1	145	Jake Butt	Denver Broncos	TE
2017	6	13	197	Jeremy Clark	New York Jets	DB
2018	3	33	97	Mason Cole	Arizona Cardinals	T
2018	5	3	140	Maurice Hurst Jr.	Oakland Raiders	DT
2019	1	10	10	Devin Bush Jr.	Pittsburgh Steelers	LB
2019	1	12	12	Rashan Gary	Green Bay Packers	DE
2019	3	13	77	Chase Winovich	New England Patriots	DE
2019	3	15	79	David Long	Los Angeles Rams	DB
2019	5	3	141	Zach Gentry	Pittsburgh Steelers	TE
2020	1	24	24	Cesar Ruiz	New Orleans Saints	C
2020	2	28	60	Josh Uche	New England Patriots	LB
2020	4	37	143	Ben Bredeson	Baltimore Ravens	G
2020	5	17	162	Khaleke Hudson	Washington Redskins	LB
2020	5	32	177	Mike Danna	Kansas City Chiefs	DE
2020	6	3	182	Michael Onwenu	New England Patriots	G
2020	6	8	187	Donovan Peoples-Jones	Cleveland Browns	WR
2020	6	13	192	Jon Runyan Jr.	Green Bay Packers	G
2020	6	26	205	Josh Metellus	Minnesota Vikings	DB
2020	6	34	213	Jordan Glasgow	Indianapolis Colts	DB
2021	1	21	21	Kwity Paye	Indianapolis Colts	DE
2021	3	4	68	Jalen Mayfield	Atlanta Falcons	T
2021	3	25	89	Nico Collins	Houston Texans	WR
2021	3	38	102	Ambry Thomas	San Francisco 49ers	DB
2021	5	33	177	Cameron McGrone	New England Patriots	LB
2021	5	40	184	Ben Mason	Baltimore Ravens	FB
2021	6	18	202	Chris Evans	Cincinnati Bengals	RB
2021	6	41	225	Camaron Cheeseman	Washington Football Team	LS
2022	1	2	2	Aidan Hutchinson	Detroit Lions	DE
2022	1	31	31	Daxton Hill	Cincinnati Bengals	S
2022	2	13	45	David Ojabo	Baltimore Ravens	DE
2022	4	26	131	Hassan Haskins	Tennessee Titans	RB
2022	7	24	245	Andrew Stueber	New England Patriots	G
2023	1	26	26	Mazi Smith	Dallas Cowboys	DT
2023	2	27	58	Luke Schoonmaker	Dallas Cowboys	TE
2023	2	29	60	D. J. Turner	Cincinnati Bengals	DB
2023	3	36	99	Jake Moody	San Francisco 49ers	K
2023	5	15	151	Mike Morris	Seattle Seahawks	DE
2023	5	18	154	Olusegun Oluwatimi	Seattle Seahawks	C
2023	6	40	217	Brad Robbins	Cincinnati Bengals	P
2023	7	21	238	Ryan Hayes	Miami Dolphins	T
2023	7	36	253	Ronnie Bell	San Francisco 49ers	WR
2024	1	10	10	J. J. McCarthy	Minnesota Vikings	QB
2024	2	17	49	Kris Jenkins	Cincinnati Bengals	DT
2024	2	18	50	Mike Sainristil	Washington Commanders	CB
2024	3	5	69	Junior Colson	Los Angeles Chargers	LB
2024	3	19	83	Blake Corum	Los Angeles Rams	RB
2024	3	20	84	Roman Wilson	Pittsburgh Steelers	WR
2024	3	21	85	Zak Zinter	Cleveland Browns	G
2024	4	21	121	AJ Barner	Seattle Seahawks	TE
2024	5	37	172	Trevor Keegan	Philadelphia Eagles	G
2024	7	20	240	Michael Barrett	Carolina Panthers	LB
2024	7	49	249	LaDarius Henderson	Houston Texans	T
2024	7	52	252	Jaylen Harrell	Tennessee Titans	DE
2024	7	53	253	Cornelius Johnson	Los Angeles Chargers	WR
2025	1	5	5	Mason Graham	Cleveland Browns	DT
2025	1	10	10	Colston Loveland	Chicago Bears	TE
2025	1	13	13	Kenneth Grant	Miami Dolphins	DT
2025	2	15	47	Will Johnson	Arizona Cardinals	CB
2025	3	26	90	Josaiah Stewart	Los Angeles Rams	DE
2025	6	12	188	Kalel Mullings	Tennessee Titans	RB
2025	6	15	191	Myles Hinton	Philadelphia Eagles	OT
2026	2	12	44	Derrick Moore	Detroit Lions	DE
2026	2	27	59	Marlin Klein	Houston Texans	TE
2026	3	28	92	Jaishawn Barham	Dallas Cowboys	LB
2026	4	18	118	Jimmy Rolder	Detroit Lions	LB
2026	5	19	159	Max Bredeson	Minnesota Vikings	FB
2026	7	34	250	Rayshaun Benny	Baltimore Ravens	DT

== Notable undrafted players ==
Note: No drafts held before 1936

Year	Player	Debut Team	Position	Notes
1947	Jack Karwales^{†}	Chicago Cardinals	E	NFL Champion (1947)
1948	Len Ford^{†}	Los Angeles Dons	DE	NFL Champion (1950, 1954, 1955)
1948	Bob Mann	Detroit Lions	E	—
1960	Don Deskins	Oakland Raiders	DT	—
1960	Fred Julian	New York Titans	CB	—
1965	Bill Laskey^{*}	Buffalo Bills	LB	Pro Bowl (1965)
1966	Bill Keating	Denver Broncos	DT	—
1974	Mike Hoban	Chicago Bears	G	—
1976	Dennis Franks	Philadelphia Eagles	C	—
1979	Gene Johnson	Pittsburgh Steelers	TE	—
1980	Chris Godfrey^{†}	Washington Redskins	DE	Super Bowl Champion (XXI)
1984	Don Bracken	Green Bay Packers	P	—
1984	Milt Carthens	Indianapolis Colts	T	—
1984	Jerry Diorio	Denver Broncos	TE	—
1984	Carlton Rose	Washington Redskins	LB	—
1985	Todd Schlopy	Buffalo Bills	K	—
1986	Gilvanni Johnson	Pittsburgh Steelers	WR	—
1986	Mike Mallory	Green Bay Packers	LB	—
1987	Ivan Hicks	Chicago Bears	DB	—
1987	Jerry Quaerna	Detroit Lions	T	—
1987	Dan Rice	New Orleans Saints	RB	—
1987	Gerald White	Dallas Cowboys	RB	—
1988	Erik Campbell	Green Bay Packers	CB	—
1990	Bobby Abrams^{†}	New York Giants	LB	Super Bowl Champion (XXV)
1990	Mike Teeter	Indianapolis Colts	DT	—
1993	Burnie Legette	New England Patriots	RB	—
1994	Ricky Powers	Detroit Lions	RB	—
1994	Sylvester Stanley	New England Patriots	DT	—
1995	Steve Morrison	Indianapolis Colts	LB	—
1997	Thomas Guynes	Arizona Cardinals	T	—
1999	Mark Campbell	Cleveland Browns	TE	—
1999	Sam Sword	Oakland Raiders	LB	—
1999	Marcus Ray	Oakland Raiders	DB	—
1999	Clarence Williams	Arizona Cardinals	RB	—
2000	James Hall	Detroit Lions	DE	—
2000	Tommy Hendricks	Miami Dolphins	LB	—
2000	Marcus Knight	Oakland Raiders	WR	—
2000	Chris Ziemann	New York Giants	T	—
2001	David Brandt	Washington Redskins	C	—
2001	Jay Feely	Atlanta Falcons	K	—
2001	DeWayne Patmon	New York Giants	DB	—
2002	Bill Seymour	Green Bay Packers	TE	—
2002	James Whitley	St. Louis Rams	DB	—
2003	Ronald Bellamy	Miami Dolphins	WR	—
2003	Julius Curry	Detroit Lions	DB	—
2003	Shantee Orr	Green Bay Packers	LB	—
2004	Alain Kashama	Chicago Bears	DE	—
2004	Larry Stevens	Cincinnati Bengals	LB	—
2005	Kevin Dudley	Atlanta Falcons	DB	—
2005	Remy Hamilton	Detroit Lions	K	—
2005	Roy Manning	Green Bay Packers	LB	—
2005	Ernest Shazor	Arizona Cardinals	DB	—
2006	Markus Curry	San Diego Chargers	DB	—
2006	Dave Pearson	Detroit Lions	C	—
2006	Adam Stenavich	Carolina Panthers	T	—
2006	Pierre Woods	New England Patriots	LB	—
2007	Grant Mason	Pittsburgh Steelers	DB	—
2008	Jamar Adams	Seattle Seahawks	DB	—
2009	Carson Butler	Green Bay Packers	TE	
2009	Tim Jamison	Houston Texans	DE	—
2009	Mike Massey	Cleveland Browns	TE	
2011	Obi Ezeh	Washington Redskins	LB	—
2012	Michael Shaw	Washington Redskins	RB	
2012	Ryan Van Bergen	Carolina Panthers	DE	—
2013	Kenny Demens	Arizona Cardinals	LB	—
2013	Jordan Kovacs	Miami Dolphins	S	—
2013	Patrick Omameh	San Francisco 49ers	G	—
2014	Cameron Gordon	New England Patriots	LB	—
2014	Fitzgerald Toussaint	Baltimore Ravens	RB	—
2015	Brennen Beyer	Baltimore Ravens	LB	—
2015	Matt Wile	Carolina Panthers	P	—
2016	Joe Kerridge	Washington Redskins	FB	—
2016	Jarrod Wilson	Jacksonville Jaguars	S	—
2017	Ben Braden	New York Jets	G	—
2017	Kyle Kalis	Washington Redskins	G	—
2017	Erik Magnuson	San Francisco 49ers	T	—
2017	Channing Stribling	Cleveland Browns	CB	—
2017	Dymonte Thomas	Denver Broncos	DB	—
2019	Brandon Watson	Jacksonville Jaguars	DB	—
2020	Sean McKeon	Dallas Cowboys	TE	—
2022	Daylen Baldwin	Cleveland Browns	WR	—
2022	Vincent Gray	New Orleans Saints	S	—
2022	Brad Hawkins	Atlanta Falcons	S	—
2022	Christopher Hinton	New York Giants	DT	—
2022	Donovan Jeter	Pittsburgh Steelers	DT	—
2022	Josh Ross	Baltimore Ravens	LB	—
2023	Gemon Green	New York Giants	DB	—
2023	Joel Honigford	Arizona Cardinals	TE	—
2024	Karsen Barnhart	Los Angeles Chargers	OT	—
2024	Trente Jones	Green Bay Packers	G	—
2024	Braiden McGregor	New York Jets	DE	—
2024	Drake Nugent	San Francisco 49ers	C	—
2024	James Turner	Detroit Lions	PK	—
2024	Josh Wallace	Los Angeles Rams	CB	—
2025	Donovan Edwards	New York Jets	RB	—
2025	Makari Paige	New York Giants	DB	—
2025	Josh Priebe	Miami Dolphins	G	—
2025	William Wagner	Cincinnati Bengals	LS	—
