= 1984 Sugar Bowl =

- 50th Sugar Bowl
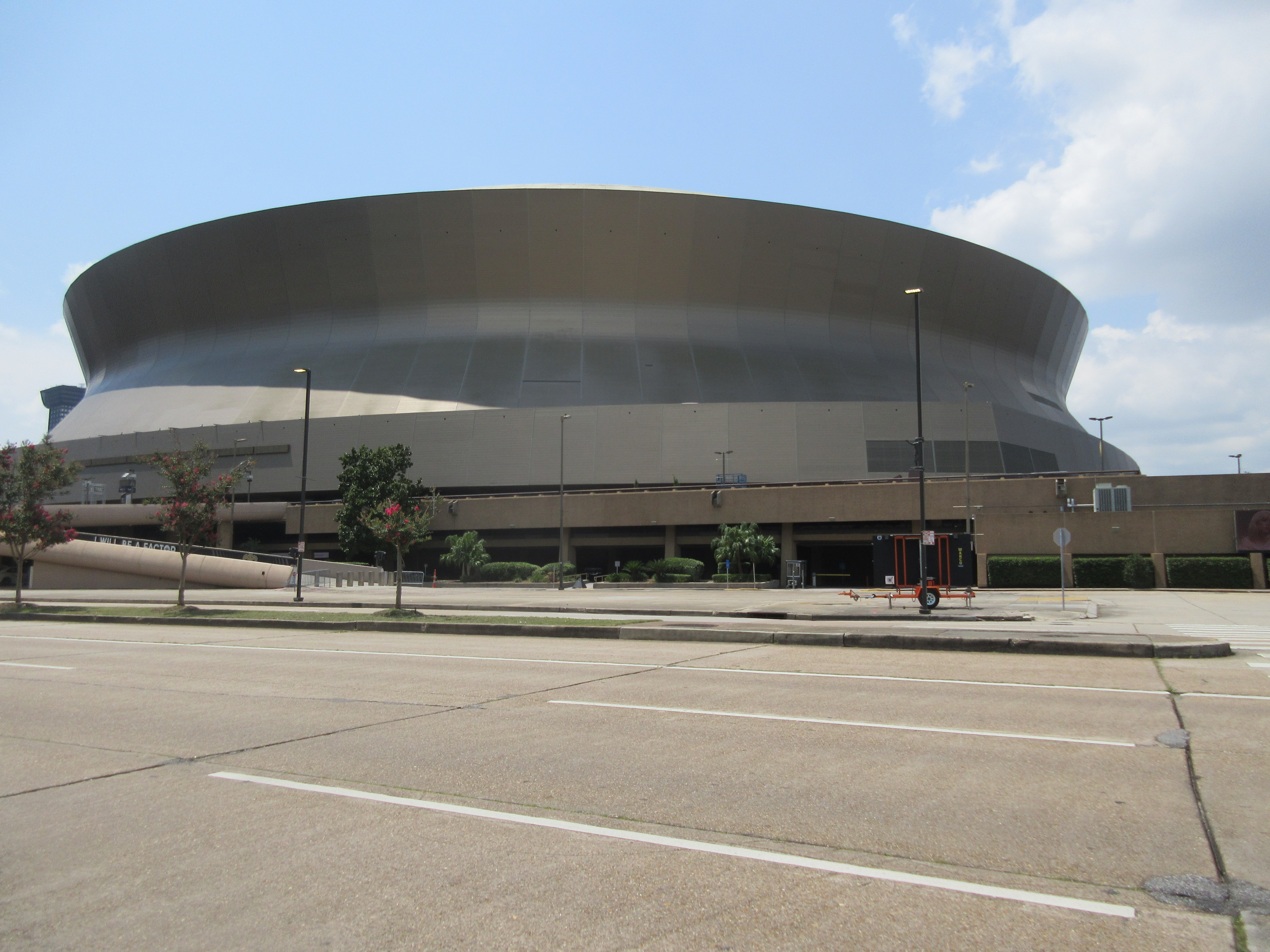
- The Louisiana Superdome in New Orleans, Louisiana, hosted the Sugar Bowl.
Auburn Tigers	Michigan Wolverines
(10–1)	(9–2)
SEC	Big Ten
9	7
Head coach: Pat Dye	Head coach: Bo Schembechler
AP / Coaches; 3 / 3	AP / Coaches; 8 / 8
	1	2	3	4	Total
Auburn	0	0	3	6	9
Michigan	7	0	0	0	7
- Date: January 2, 1984
- Season: 1983
- Stadium: Louisiana Superdome
- Location: New Orleans, Louisiana
- MVP: Bo Jackson (Auburn RB)
- Favorite: Auburn by 4 to 4½ points
- Referee: Dixon Holman (SWC)
- Attendance: 77,893

United States TV coverage
- Network: ABC
- Announcers: Keith Jackson, Frank Broyles

The 1984 Sugar Bowl was the 50th edition of the college football bowl game, played at the Louisiana Superdome in New Orleans, Louisiana, on Monday, January 2. Part of the 1983–84 bowl game season, it matched the third-ranked Auburn Tigers of the Southeastern Conference (SEC), and the #8 Michigan Wolverines of the Big Ten Conference. Favored Auburn was shut out until the third quarter, but rallied with three field goals to win 9–7.

New Year's Day was on Sunday in 1984, and the college bowl games were played the following day.

== Game summary ==
The game kicked off shortly after 7 p.m. CST, televised by ABC, at the same time as the Orange Bowl on NBC.

The only scoring in the first half was on a four-yard touchdown run by Michigan quarterback Steve Smith. It was set up by a 19-yard completion from Smith to Triando Makray, and 38 yards rushing by Rick Rogers. The Wolverines finished the first quarter with a 116–61 differential in yardage and took that 7–0 lead into halftime.

Auburn used a tremendous Wishbone rushing attack throughout the game and attempted only six passes. They finished with 301 rushing yards on 21 first downs, with 130 yards by Bo Jackson, the game's MVP. Midway through the third quarter, Auburn kicker Al Del Greco made a 31-yard field goal to get the Tigers on the scoreboard and the quarter ended with Michigan leading 7–3. In the fourth quarter, Del Greco added two more field goals, of 32 and 19 yards, the latter in the last half-minute, to seal a 9–7 victory for Auburn.

=== Scoring ===
First quarter

- Michigan – Steve Smith 4-yard run (Bob Bergeron kick)

Second quarter
No scoring
Third quarter

- Auburn – Al Del Greco 31-yard field goal

Fourth quarter

- Auburn – Del Greco 32-yard field goal
- Auburn – Del Greco 19-yard field goal

== Statistics ==
Statistics	Auburn	Michigan
First downs	21	12
Rushes–yards	67–301	31–118
Passing yards	21	125
Passing (C–A–I)	2–6–1	9–25–1
Total offense	73–332	56–243
Return yards	8	13
Punts–average	4–42.0	8–38.3
Fumbles–lost	4–3	2–1
Turnovers	4	2
Penalties–yards	3–15	6–49
Time of possession	37:32	22:28

== Aftermath ==
Despite Auburn's victory and a loss in the Cotton Bowl by No. 2 Texas, who Auburn had lost to by 13 points at home on September 17, the Tigers were not voted national champions in either of the final wire service polls. The #5 Miami Hurricanes vaulted past Auburn to the top spot with their 31–30 victory over top-ranked Nebraska in the Orange Bowl; Auburn remained at third in both final polls.

Auburn returned to the Sugar Bowl four years later. Michigan's next appearance in New Orleans was in 2012.
