= Steve Smith (quarterback) =

American gridiron football player (born 1962)

No. 11
- Position: Quarterback

Personal information
- Born: December 19, 1962 (age 63)
- Listed height: 6 ft 0 in (1.83 m)

Career information
- High school: Grand Blanc (MI)
- College: Michigan
- Supplemental draft: 1984: 2nd round, 34th overall pick

Career history
- Montreal Concordes (1984); Ottawa Rough Riders (1985); San Diego Chargers (1986)*
- * Offseason or practice squad member only

Awards and highlights
- Second-team All-Big Ten (1982)

Steve Smith (born December 19, 1962) is an American former football quarterback. He played college football as the starting quarterback for the Michigan Wolverines from 1981 to 1983. He also played in the Canadian Football League (CFL) for the Montreal Concordes in 1984 and the Ottawa Rough Riders in 1985.

== Early life ==
Smith attended Grand Blanc High School in Grand Blanc, Michigan. He also played high school football for Swartz Creek prior to transferring to Grand Blanc for his senior year, joining his former high school coach.

== University of Michigan ==
Smith played college football at the University of Michigan for Bo Schembechler's Wolverines teams from 1980 to 1983. As a sophomore, Smith started all 12 games for the 1981 Wolverines and led the team to a record of 8–3 in the regular season and a win over UCLA in the 1981 Bluebonnet Bowl. He had his best statistical season in 1981, completing 97 of 210 passes for 1,661 yards and 15 touchdowns while also rushing for 674 yards and 12 touchdowns.

As a junior, Smith again started all 12 games at quarterback for the 1982 Wolverines, leading the team to a record of 8–3 in the regular season, and a berth in the 1983 Rose Bowl, where the Wolverines lost to UCLA, 24–14. Receiver Anthony Carter was Smith's main target in 1981 and 1982, earning All-American honors both years. Smith completed 118 of 227 passes in 1982 for 1,735 yards, though his rushing total dropped to 387 yards on 83 carries. He also threw a career-high 13 interceptions in 1982. He was also selected by the Associated Press as the second-team quarterback on its 1982 All-Big Ten Conference football team.

As a senior in 1983, Smith threw four touchdown passes and rushed for a fifth in a 42–10 victory over the Purdue Boilermakers. He led the 1983 Wolverines to a 9–2 record in the regular season and a berth in the 1984 Sugar Bowl, where the Wolverines lost to Auburn, 9–7. Smith completed 106 out of 205 passes for 1,420 yards and rushed for 667 yards on 103 attempts during the 1983 season.

Smith was 26–10 as a starter for the Wolverines, completing 324 of 648 passes for 4,860 yards, 42 touchdowns and 32 interceptions. He also rushed 1,736 yards on 329 carries (5.3 yards per carry) and 31 rushing touchdowns. When he finished his career at Michigan, he was also the team's all-time leading passer, a record that has since been surpassed.

== Professional football ==
In March 1984, Smith signed a contract to play for the Montreal Concordes in the Canadian Football League (CFL). During the 1984 CFL season, completing 19 of 45 passes for 263 yards, three touchdowns and seven interceptions. In 1985, Smith was on the roster of the Ottawa Rough Riders.

Smith signed a contract with the San Diego Chargers, who had drafted him in the second round of the 1984 Supplemental Draft, in April 1986, but did not appear in any regular season games with the club.
