= Dwight Beverly =

American gridiron football player (born 1961)

No. 20, 47, 29
- Position: Running back

Personal information
- Born: December 5, 1961; Long Beach, California, U.S.
- Listed height: 5 ft 11 in (1.80 m)
- Listed weight: 205 lb (93 kg)

Career information
- High school: Locke (Los Angeles, California)
- College: Illinois
- NFL draft: 1984: 6th round, 147th overall pick

Career history
- Indianapolis Colts (1984)*; Portland Breakers (1985); Calgary Stampeders (1985–1986); New Orleans Saints (1987); Calgary Stampeders (1988)*
- * Offseason or practice squad member only

Awards and highlights
- First-team All-Big Ten (1983)

Career NFL statistics
- Rushing yards: 217
- Rushing average: 3.5
- Touchdowns: 2
- Stats at Pro Football Reference

Dwight Anthony Beverly (born December 5, 1961) is an American former professional football player who was a running back who played in the National Football League (NFL). He played college football for the Illinois Fighting Illini.

== Early life ==
Beverly was born and grew up in Long Beach, California and attended Locke High School in South Los Angeles. After his senior season he was selected to play in the Prep Senior Bowl.

== College career ==
Beverly began his collegiate career at Long Beach City College before transferring to the University of Illinois Urbana-Champaign after his sophomore year. Beverly rushed for a team leading 390 yards and two touchdowns as a junior. As a senior he was named first-team All-Big Ten Conference after rushing for 685 yards and nine touchdowns with nine receptions for 77 yards and another touchdown as Illinois won the Big Ten Conference title.

== Professional career ==
Beverly was selected by the Indianapolis Colts in the sixth round of the 1984 NFL draft but was cut during training camp. He was signed by the Portland Breakers of the United States Football League. Beverly was signed by the Calgary Stampeders of the Canadian Football League after the end of the USFL season and was re-signed by the team midway through the 1986 season. Beverly was signed by the New Orleans Saints in October 1987 as a replacement player during the 1987 NFL players strike. He rushed 62 times for 217 yards and two touchdowns and started three games and was released when the strike ended. Beverly was signed by the Stampeders for a third time in 1988 but was released during the preseason.
