= Kevin Brooks (American football) =

American football player (born 1963)

No. 99, 97
- Positions: Defensive tackle, defensive end

Personal information
- Born: February 9, 1963 (age 63); Detroit, Michigan, U.S.
- Listed height: 6 ft 6 in (1.98 m)
- Listed weight: 277 lb (126 kg)

Career information
- High school: Mackenzie (Detroit)
- College: Michigan
- NFL draft: 1985: 1st round, 17th overall pick

Career history
- Dallas Cowboys (1985–1988); Denver Broncos (1989)*; Detroit Lions (1989–1990)
- * Offseason or practice squad member only

Awards and highlights
- 2× First-team All-Big Ten (1983, 1984)

Career NFL statistics
- Sacks: 15.5
- Fumble recoveries: 2
- Stats at Pro Football Reference

Kevin Craig Brooks (born February 9, 1963) is an American former professional football player who was a defensive tackle in the National Football League (NFL) for the Dallas Cowboys and Detroit Lions. He played college football for the Michigan Wolverines. He was selected by the Cowboys in the first round of the 1985 NFL draft.

== Early life ==
Brooks was born in Detroit, Michigan, in 1963. He attended Mackenzie High School in Detroit, where he was an All-American and an All-state defensive lineman. He was a member of the National Honor Society and received his school's scholar-athlete award, while graduating in 1981.

== College career ==
Brooks enrolled at the University of Michigan in the fall of 1981 and played college football for head coach Bo Schembechler's Michigan Wolverines football teams from 1981 to 1984. He played at outside linebacker as a freshman before moving to the defensive tackle position in 1982. As a sophomore, he started the first 4 games at defensive tackle for the 1982 Michigan Wolverines football team, before a knee injury against the University of Indiana sidelined him for 4 contests. He returned to start against UCLA in the 1983 Rose Bowl, making 10 tackles (second on the team).

As a junior, he started all 12 games at defensive tackle for the 1983 Michigan team that compiled a 9–3 record and was ranked #8 in the final AP Poll. He posted 48 tackles (seventh on the team), 6 tackles for loss and 3 sacks. At the end of the season, he was selected by the conference coaches as a first-team defensive lineman on the 1983 All-Big Ten Conference football team.

As a senior, he started 11 games at defensive tackle for the 1984 Michigan team. At 6'6", 273 lbs, Brooks led the team with six sacks and 13 tackles for loss, while also making 69 tackles (fourth on the team). He was selected for the second consecutive year as an All-Big Ten player.

During his college career at Michigan, Brooks recorded 156 tackles, two pass breakups and two fumble recoveries.

== Professional football ==
=== Dallas Cowboys ===
In the 1985 NFL draft the Dallas Cowboys were targeting Jerry Rice with their first round selection, but settled for Brooks (17th overall) after Rice was taken by the San Francisco 49ers. He had a disappointing rookie season, playing all four defensive line positions, registering 12 tackles and 2 sacks. His best game came against the Houston Oilers, when he replaced an injured Jim Jeffcoat in the second half, making 4 tackles and one sack.

In 1986, he competed with John Dutton for the left defensive tackle position, but suffered a dislocated knee cap in the preseason game against the San Diego Chargers. He lost 7 games on the injured reserve list, limiting him to 9 regular season games as a backup and 9 tackles to go along with 2.5 sacks.

In 1987, he became the starter at left defensive tackle after passing Dutton on the depth chart. When the players went on a strike on the third week of the season, those contests were canceled (reducing the 16-game season to 15) and the NFL decided that the games would be played with replacement players. On October 7, he crossed the picket line and joined the replacement team. He led the team's defensive linemen with 67 tackles, while adding 3 sacks during the season.

In 1988, he started 14 out of 15 games, registering 71 tackles and 5 sacks. In the spring of 1989, Brooks clashed with new head coach Jimmy Johnson, before being traded along with a fourth round draft choice (#82-Jeroy Robinson) to the Denver Broncos, in exchange for a third round draft choice (#80-Greg McMurtry).

=== Denver Broncos ===
In 1989, the Denver Broncos moved Brooks to defensive end and lasted just a few months before being released on September 4.

=== Detroit Lions ===
On September 11, 1989, he signed with the Detroit Lions and was named the starting right defensive end after Keith Ferguson was injured. He started 15 games, registering 39 tackles and 2 sacks. The next year, he appeared in only six games (4 starts) at defensive tackle and was waived by the Lions on November 2, 1990.

Brooks retired after playing in the NFL for six seasons from 1985 to 1990. He appeared in 69 games, 45 of them as a starter. He is credited with 15.5 quarterback sacks and two fumble recoveries.

== Personal life ==
After retiring from football, Brooks suffered from depression, and his weight increased to nearly 400 pounds. He underwent a gastric sleeve weight-loss procedure, lost 110 pounds, and became a celebrity spokesperson for The Alexander Center for Obesity Surgery in Dallas. He is divorced and has five children. His father is former NFL player Ted Wheeler.
