= Jerry Diorio =

American football player (born 1962)

No. 84
- Positions: Guard, tight end

Personal information
- Born: January 11, 1962 (age 64); Youngstown, Ohio, U.S.
- Listed height: 6 ft 3 in (1.91 m)
- Listed weight: 245 lb (111 kg)

Career information
- High school: Cardinal Mooney (Youngstown)
- College: Michigan
- NFL draft: 1984: undrafted

Career history
- Denver Broncos (1984)*; Stiassi Doves (1985-1987); Detroit Lions (1987)
- * Offseason or practice squad member only

Awards and highlights
- Second-team All-Big Ten (1983)
- Stats at Pro Football Reference

Gerald J. Diorio (born January 11, 1962) is an American former professional football player for the Detroit Lions of the National Football League (NFL). He played college football for the Michigan Wolverines from 1980 to 1983 as an offensive guard. He later played professional football in the Italian Football League from 1985-1987 and appeared in two games for the Lions as a replacement player and tight end during the 1987 NFL strike.

== Early life ==
Diorio was born in Youngstown, Ohio, in 1962. He played football there at Cardinal Mooney High School.

== College career ==
Diorio enrolled at the University of Michigan in 1980 and played football under head football coach Bo Schembechler from 1980 to 1983. While playing at Michigan, Diorio was 6 feet, 4 inches tall and weighed 235 pounds. He started four games at right guard for the 1981 Michigan Wolverines football team and six games at the same position for the 1982 team. Diorio started all 12 games at left guard for the 1983 Michigan Wolverines football team that finished the season with a 9-3 record and ranked No. 8 in the final AP poll and No. 9 in the final UPI poll. In January 1984, Diorio played in the East-West Shrine Game at Stanford Stadium in Palo Alto, California. He was also selected as a second-team All-Big Ten guard by the Associated Press, and a first-team member of the 1983 Big Ten All-Academic football team.

== Professional career ==
After graduating from Michigan, Diorio was undrafted in the 1984 NFL draft. He tried out with the Denver Broncos in 1984, and played professional football in the Italian Football League for the Stiassi Bologna Doves, who won "the Italian Super Bowl" in 1985. In 1987, Diorio appeared in two games in the National Football League (NFL) as a replacement player and tight end with the Detroit Lions during the 1987 NFL strike.

== Coaching career ==
From 2004 to 2008, Diorio was the head football coach at Wayland Union High School in Wayland, Michigan. In 2007, he was named Regional Coach of the Year by the Michigan High School Football Coaches Association. In 2008, Diorio coached his Wayland Union team against his former University of Michigan line coach Elliott Uzelac, who was then coaching high school football in St. Joseph, Michigan; Uzelac's team won the game, 32-31, in overtime. In 2009, he became an assistant football coach at Byron Center High School in Byron Center, Michigan. In 2018, he was hired as the head football coach at Lakeview High School in Battle Creek, Michigan.
