= Stefan Humphries =

American football player (born 1962)

No. 75, 79
- Position: Guard

Personal information
- Born: January 20, 1962 (age 64); Fort Lauderdale, Florida, U.S.
- Listed height: 6 ft 3 in (1.91 m)
- Listed weight: 265 lb (120 kg)

Career information
- High school: St. Thomas Aquinas (Fort Lauderdale)
- College: Michigan
- NFL draft: 1984: 3rd round, 71st overall pick

Career history
- Chicago Bears (1984–1986); Denver Broncos (1987–1988)

Awards and highlights
- Super Bowl champion (XX); First-team All-American (1983); 2× First-team All-Big Ten (1982, 1983)

Career NFL statistics
- Games played: 33
- Games started: 8
- Stats at Pro Football Reference

Stefan Govan Humphries (born January 20, 1962) is an American former professional football player. He played college football at the University of Michigan, principally as an offensive guard, from 1980 to 1983. He also played five seasons in the National Football League (NFL) as an offensive guard for the Chicago Bears from 1984 to 1986 and for the Denver Broncos from 1987 to 1988.

== Early life ==
Humphries was born in Fort Lauderdale, Florida, in 1962, and attended St. Thomas Aquinas High School in that city.

== University of Michigan ==
Humphries enrolled at the University of Michigan in 1980 and played college football on Bo Schembechler's Michigan Wolverines football teams from 1980 to 1983. As a freshman, he was a defensive lineman for the 1980 Michigan Wolverines football team that compiled a 10–2 record and was ranked #4 in the final AP Poll. As a sophomore, Humphries was converted to the offensive guard position where he played for the remainder of his career. After his junior year, he was selected by both the conference coaches (UPI) and media (AP) as a first-team player on the 1982 All-Big Ten Conference football team. As a senior, he was again selected by the AP as a first-team All-Big Ten player.

Humphries was also an outstanding student while attending the University of Michigan, and in 1984, he was a recipient of the NCAA Top Five Award, honoring five outstanding senior student-athletes in the Class of 1984.

== Professional football ==
Humphries was selected by the Chicago Bears in the third round (71st overall pick) of the 1984 NFL draft. He played three seasons for the Bears from 1984 to 1986, appearing in 25 games, none as a starter. He was a part of the 1985 Bears team that won Super Bowl XX. He was also a member of the "Shuffling Crew" in the video The Super Bowl Shuffle. He spent most of the 1986 NFL season on injured reserve after suffering a foot injury in preseason training camp. He was reactivated at the end of November and appeared in four games.

In August 1987, the Bears traded Humphries to the Denver Broncos in exchange for punter Bryan Wagner. He appeared in seven games, all as the Broncos' starting right guard, during the 1987 NFL season. He appeared in only one game for the Broncos in 1988, having been placed on injured reserve status after the first game of the season. In August 1989, the Broncos announced Humphries' retirement.

== Later life ==
After a career in football, Humphries attended University of Colorado School of Medicine in the early 1990s, and completed a residency in physical medicine and rehabilitation at the Mayo Clinic. He was the medical director for Renown Rehabilitation Hospital in Reno, Nevada, and is currently the medical director for HCA Gulf Coast Rehabilitation in Hospital Unit in Panama City, Florida .
