= 1983 All-Big Ten Conference football team =

The 1983 All-Big Ten Conference football team consists of American football players chosen by various organizations for All-Big Ten Conference teams for the 1983 college football season. The 1983 Illinois Fighting Illini football team won the conference championship and had seven players selected as first-team players by the Associated Press or United Press International. Iowa followed with six first-team selections, including quarterback Chuck Long and linebacker Larry Station. Michigan had five first-team players, including center Tom Dixon and guard Stefan Humphries.

== Offensive selections ==
=== Quarterbacks ===
- Chuck Long, Iowa (AP-1; UPI-1)
- Jack Trudeau, Illinois (AP-2; UPI-2)

=== Running backs ===
- Dwight Beverly, Illinois (AP-1; UPI-1)
- Keith Byars, Ohio State (AP-1; UPI-1)
- Thomas Rooks, Illinois (AP-2; UPI-2)
- Ricky Edwards, Northwestern (AP-2)
- Rick Rogers, Michigan (UPI-2)
- Vaughn Broadnax, Ohio State (UPI-2)

=== Wide receivers ===
- Dave Moritz, Iowa (AP-1; UPI-1)
- Duane Gunn, Indiana (AP-1; UPI-2)
- Al Toon, Wisconsin (AP-2; UPI-1)
- David Williams, Illinois (AP-2; UPI-2)

=== Tight ends ===
- John Frank, Ohio State (AP-1; UPI-1)
- Tim Brewster, Illinois (AP-2; UPI-2)

=== Centers ===
- Tom Dixon, Michigan (AP-1; UPI-1)
- Joel Hilgenberg, Iowa (AP-2; UPI-2)

=== Guards ===
- Stefan Humphries, Michigan (AP-1; UPI-1)
- Jim Juriga, Illinois (AP-1; UPI-1)
- Kirk Lowdermilk, Ohio State (AP-2)
- Jerry Diorio, Michigan (AP-2)
- Joe Levelis, Iowa (UPI-2)
- Scott Zalenski, Ohio State (UPI-2)

=== Tackles ===
- Chris Babyar, Illinois (AP-1; UPI-1)
- John Alt, Iowa (AP-1)
- William Roberts, Ohio State (AP-2; UPI-2)
- Jeff Dellenbach, Wisconsin (AP-2)
- Mark Krerowicz, Ohio State (UPI-2)

== Defensive selections ==
=== Defensive linemen ===
- Mark Butkus, Illinois (AP-1; UPI-1)
- Paul Hufford, Iowa (AP-1; UPI-1)
- Don Thorp, Illinois (AP-1; UPI-1)
- Al Sincich, Michigan (AP-1; UPI-2)
- Kevin Brooks, Michigan (AP-2; UPI-1)
- Keith Cruise, Northwestern (AP-2; UPI-2)
- Spencer Nelms, Ohio State (AP-2; UPI-2)
- Tony Wancket, Iowa (AP-2)
- Chris Scott, Purdue (UPI-2)

=== Linebackers ===
- Carl Banks, Michigan State (AP-1; UPI-1)
- James Melka, Wisconsin (AP-1; UPI-1)
- Larry Station, Iowa (AP-1; UPI-1)
- Rowland Tatum, Ohio State (AP-1; UPI-1)
- Mike Mallory, Michigan (AP-2; UPI-2)
- Carlton Rose, Michigan (AP-2; UPI-2)
- Peter Najarian, Minnesota (AP-2; UPI-2)
- Mike Weingrad, Illinois (AP-2; UPI-2)

=== Defensive backs ===
- Craig Swoope, Illinois (AP-1; UPI-1)
- Evan Cooper, Michigan (AP-1; UPI-2)
- Garcia Lane, Ohio State (AP-1; UPI-2)
- Phil Parker, Michigan State (AP-2; UPI-1)
- Mike Stoops, Iowa (AP-2; UPI-1)
- Mike Heaven, Illinois (AP-2; UPI-2)

== Special teams ==
=== Placekicker ===
- Bob Bergeron, Michigan (AP-1)
- Chris White, Illinois (AP-2; UPI-1)

=== Punter ===
- John Kidd, Northwestern (AP-1; UPI-1)
- Ralf Mojsiejenko, Michigan State (AP-2)
- Karl Edwards, Ohio State (UPI-2)

== Key ==
Bold = Selected as a first-team player by both the media (AP) and coaches (UPI)

AP = Associated Press, "selected by a panel of sports writers and broadcasters covering the conference football scene"

UPI = United Press International, selected by the Big Ten Conference coaches

== See also ==
- 1983 College Football All-America Team
