= Milt Carthens =

American football player (1960–2021)

No. 28
- Position: Offensive tackle

Personal information
- Born: December 22, 1960
- Died: December 17, 2021 (age 60)

Career information
- College: Michigan

Career history
- Michigan Panthers (1984)*; Indianapolis Colts (1987); Detroit Lions (1988)*
- * Offseason or practice squad member only

Career statistics
- Games played: 1
- Stats at Pro Football Reference

Milton B. "Big Money" Carthens (December 22, 1960 - December 17, 2021) was an American football player.

Carthen was born in 1960 and graduated from Bloomfield Hills Lahser High School in 1980.

He enrolled at the University of Michigan and played for Michigan Wolverines football team under Bo Schembechler. He redshirted as a freshman and was used principally as a blocker on special teams over the next two years. In October 1983, playing at tight end, he caught two passes for 49 yards, including a 23-yard touchdown pass from Steve Smith Smith in a victory over Michigan State.

He was drafted by the Michigan Panthers in the USFL's 1984 territorial draft. He left school early to join the Panthers in 1984, accepting a $6,000 bonus. However, he was cut by the Panthers before the season began. He signed in 1987 with the Indianapolis Colts in 1987 and appeared in one game for the team. He signed with the Detroit Lions in May 1988, but was waived in late August 1988.

As of 2010, Carthens was employed as a social worker in Detroit. He died in 2021 at age 60.
