= Carlton Rose =

American football player (1962–2006)

No. 50
- Position: Linebacker

Personal information
- Born: February 8, 1962; Pompano Beach, Florida, U.S.
- Died: March 26, 2006 (aged 44)

Career information
- College: Michigan

Career history
- 1984: Michigan Panthers
- 1985: Los Angeles Express
- 1987: Washington Redskins

Awards and highlights
- Second-team All-Big Ten (1983)
- Stats at Pro Football Reference

Carlton S. Rose (February 8, 1962 - March 26, 2006) was an American football player. He played college football as a linebacker at the University of Michigan from 1980 to 1983. He played professional football as a linebacker in the United States Football League (USFL) in 1984 and 1985 and in the National Football League (NFL) for the Washington Redskins as a linebacker and during the 1987 NFL strike.

== Early life ==
Rose was born in Pompano Beach, Florida, in 1962. He attended Stranahan High School in Ft. Lauderdale, Florida.

== University of Michigan ==
Rose enrolled at the University of Michigan in 1980 and played college football for Bo Schembechler's Michigan Wolverines football teams from 1980 to 1983. As a junior, he started 11 games at outside linebacker for the 1982 Michigan Wolverines football team. As a senior, he started six games at outside linebacker and won the 1983 Dick Katcher Award. He was selected by the conference coaches as a second-team linebacker on the 1983 All-Big Ten Conference football team.

== Professional football ==
After graduating from Michigan, Rose played professional football in the United States Football League (USFL) for the Michigan Panthers in 1984 and Los Angeles Express in 1985 and in the Canadian Football League (CFL) for the Ottawa Rough Riders. He also played two games in the National Football League (NFL) for the Washington Redskins as a replacement player during the 1987 NFL strike.

== Later life ==
Rose died of a stroke in 2006 at age 44.
