= Evan Cooper =

American football player (born 1962)

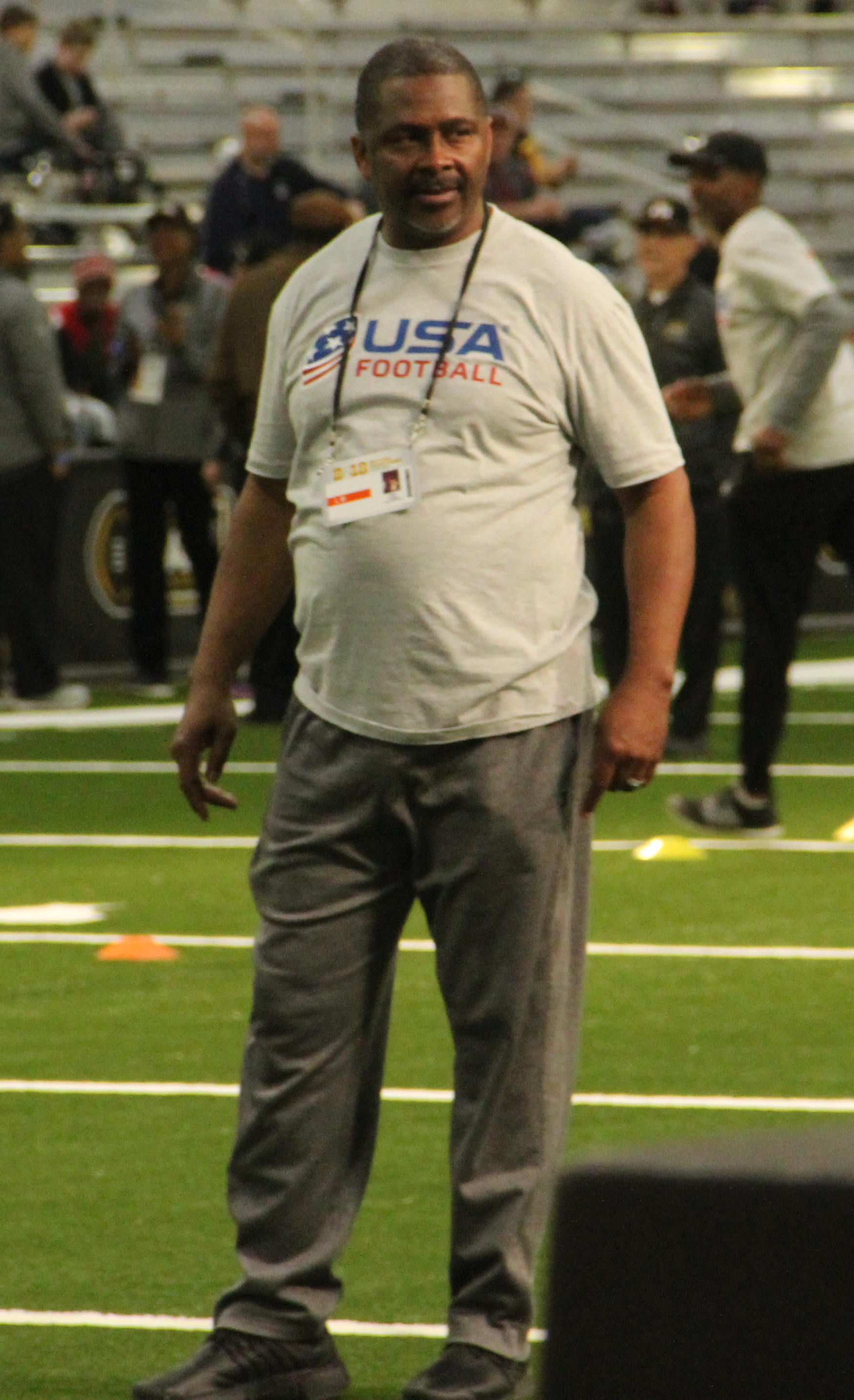
- Cooper in 2018

No. 21, 20
- Positions: Safety, punt returner

Personal information
- Born: June 25, 1962 (age 64); Miami, Florida, U.S.
- Listed height: 5 ft 11 in (1.80 m)
- Listed weight: 185 lb (84 kg)

Career information
- High school: Miami Killian (Kendall, Florida)
- College: Michigan
- NFL draft: 1984: 4th round, 88th overall pick

Career history
- Philadelphia Eagles (1984–1987); Houston Oilers (1988)*; Atlanta Falcons (1988–1989); Tampa Bay Buccaneers (1990)*
- * Offseason or practice squad member only

Awards and highlights
- First-team All-Big Ten (1983)

Career NFL statistics
- Interceptions: 11
- Fumble recoveries: 2
- Sacks: 2
- Stats at Pro Football Reference

Evan Cooper (born June 28, 1962) is an American former professional football player who was a safety in the National Football League (NFL). He played college football for the Michigan Wolverines from 1980 to 1983. He played in the NFL for the Philadelphia Eagles from 1984 to 1987 and Atlanta Falcons from 1988 to 1989.

== Early life and education ==
Cooper was born in Miami, Florida, in 1962. He attended Killian High School in the Kendall area of Miami, Florida.

== University of Michigan ==
Cooper enrolled at the University of Michigan in 1980 and played college football as a defensive back and punt returner for head coach Bo Schembechler's Michigan Wolverines football teams from 1980 to 1983. He started four games at cornerback in 1981, 12 games at free safety in 1982, and 12 games at strong and free safety in 1983. He was selected by the Associated Press as a first-team All-Big Ten defensive back in 1983. In his four years at Michigan, Cooper recorded 129 tackles, 12 pass breakups, 10 interceptions, and 100 interception return yards. He also returned 40 punts for 428 yards, an average of 10.7 yards per return.

== Professional football ==
Cooper was selected by the Philadelphia Eagles in the fourth round (88th overall pick) of the 1984 NFL draft. During the 1984 and 1985 seasons, the Eagles used him as a punt returner. During those two seasons, he returned 83 punts for 614 yards, an average of 7.4 yards per return. He also returned 20 kickoffs for 331 yards, an average of 16.6 yards per return. In 1985, he started 13 games for the Eagles at the right cornerback position.

In 1988, Cooper joined the Atlanta Falcons. He was a kick returner during the 1988 season, returning two punts and 16 kickoffs. He concluded his playing career in 1989 with the Falcons, starting 13 games at the strong safety position. He intercepted four passes and had 54 interception return yards during the 1989 season.

== Coaching career ==
Cooper began the 2022 season as the cornerbacks coach for the Carolina Panthers. After a head coach change, new interim head coach Steve Wilks fired Cooper along with defensive line coach Paul Pasqualoni on November 7, 2022.
