= Tom Dixon (American football) =

American football player (born 1961)

No. 69
- Position: Center

Personal information
- Born: August 21, 1961 (age 65)

Career information
- High school: Bishop Dwenger (Fort Wayne, Indiana)
- College: Michigan
- Supplemental draft: 1984: 2nd round, 52nd overall pick

Career history
- Michigan Panthers (1984)

Awards and highlights
- First-team All-American (1983); 2× First-team All-Big Ten (1982, 1983)

Tom Dixon (born August 21, 1961) is an American former football player. He played college football at the University of Michigan and professional football for the Michigan Panthers of the United States Football League (USFL). He was a first-team All-American at the center position in 1983.

Dixon grew up in Indiana and attended Bishop Dwenger High School in Fort Wayne, Indiana. He enrolled at the University of Michigan in 1980 and played for Bo Schembechler's Michigan Wolverines football teams from 1980 to 1983. Dixon started every game for the Wolverines in the 1981, 1982, and 1983 seasons. As a junior, he was selected by both the conference coaches (UPI) and media (AP) as the first-team center on the 1982 All-Big Ten Conference football team. As a senior, he was selected by the Associated Press, American Football Coaches Association and the Sporting News as a first-team center on the 1983 College Football All-America Team.

In April 1984, Dixon signed to play professional football for the Michigan Panthers of the United States Football League (USFL). He played for the Panthers in 1984, but the team disbanded after the 1984 season. He signed with the Pittsburgh Steelers, who had selected him in the second round of the 1984 Supplemental Draft, in May 1985, then quit the team in late July 1985.
