= Bob Bergeron =

American football player (born 1961)

Profile
- Position: Placekicker

Personal information
- Born: November 7, 1961 (age 64)
- Listed height: 5 ft 8 in (1.73 m)
- Listed weight: 160 lb (73 kg)

Career information
- High school: Bishop Luers
- College: Michigan

Awards and highlights
- First-team All-Big Ten (1983)

Robert Damian Bergeron (born November 7, 1961) is an American former football placekicker. He grew up in Fort Wayne, Indiana, and attended Bishop Luers High School. He played college football for the University of Michigan from 1980 to 1984. He was a non-scholarship player who made the Michigan Wolverines football team as a walk-on. From 1980 to 1982, Bergeron saw limited playing time as a backup to Ali Haji-Sheikh. As a junior in 1983, he successfully converted 31 of 34 extra point conversions and 15 of 17 field goal attempts, including a game-winning 45-yard field goal with eight seconds remaining against Iowa. He was selected by the Associated Press as the first-team placekicker on the 1983 All-Big Ten Conference football team. As a senior in 1984, he was successful on 13 of 16 field goal attempts, including four of five attempts against Illinois.
