= Rick Rogers =

American football player (born 1963)

Profile
- Position: Running back

Personal information
- Listed height: 6 ft 2 in (1.88 m)
- Listed weight: 216 lb (98 kg)

Career information
- High school: Wayne Memorial (Wayne, Michigan)
- College: Michigan

Awards and highlights
- Second-team All-Big Ten (1983)

Rick Rogers (born March 26, 1963) is an American former college football player who was a running back for the Michigan Wolverines. He grew up in Inkster, Michigan, and attended Wayne Memorial High School. He played at the University of Michigan for the Wolverines from 1981 to 1984. As a junior in 1983, he rushed for 1,002 yards on 209 carries for a 4.9 yard average and nine touchdowns. He was selected as a second-team running back on the 1983 All-Big Ten Conference football team.

In four years at Michigan, he gained 1,942 yards on 435 carries for an average of 4.5 yards per carry and 16 touchdowns. He had four games in which he rushed for over 100 yards – 124 yards on 19 carries against Washington State on September 10, 1983 (including 62 yards in the fourth quarter); 124 yards on 20 carries against Northwestern on October 15, 1983; 125 yards on 26 carries against Iowa on October 22, 1983; and 139 yards on 27 carries against Northwestern on October 13, 1984.
