= Bo Schembechler =

American college football player and coach, sports administrator (1929–2006)

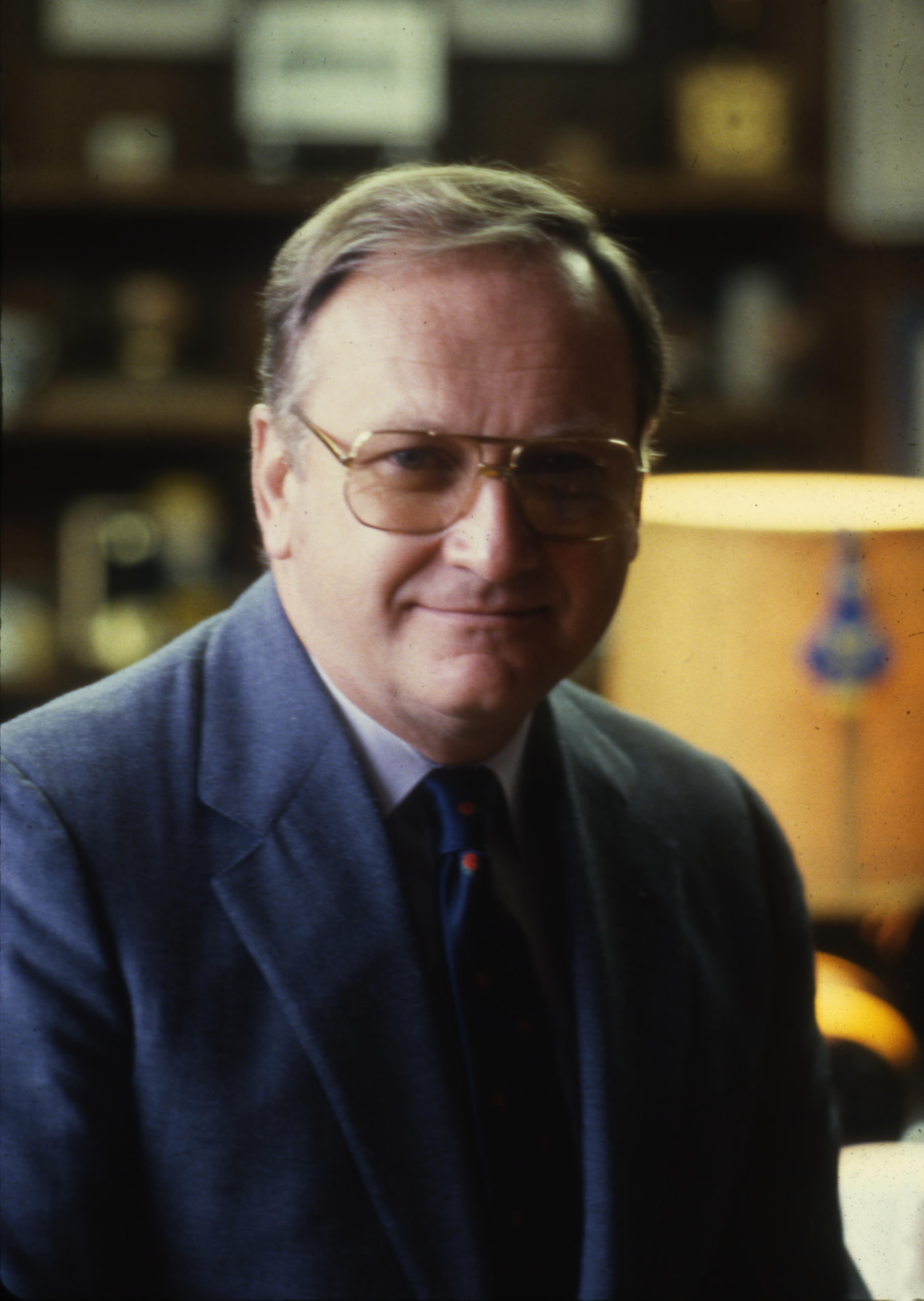
- Schembechler in 1984

Biographical details
- Born: April 1, 1929; Barberton, Ohio, U.S.
- Died: November 17, 2006 (aged 77); Southfield, Michigan, U.S.

Playing career
- 1948–1950: Miami (OH)
- Position: Tackle

Coaching career (HC unless noted)
- 1951: Ohio State (GA)
- 1954: Presbyterian (assistant)
- 1955: Bowling Green (freshman)
- 1956–1957: Northwestern (assistant)
- 1958–1962: Ohio State (assistant)
- 1963–1968: Miami (OH)
- 1969–1989: Michigan

Administrative career (AD unless noted)
- 1988–1990: Michigan
- 1990–1992: Detroit Tigers (president)

Head coaching record
- Overall: 234–65–8
- Bowls: 5–12

Accomplishments and honors

Championships
- 2 Mid-American (1965–1966); 13 Big Ten (1969, 1971–1974, 1976–1978, 1980, 1982, 1986, 1988–1989)

Awards
- AFCA Coach of the Year (1969); Walter Camp Coach of the Year (1969); Bobby Dodd Coach of the Year Award (1977); Sporting News College Football COY (1985); George Munger Award (1989); Amos Alonzo Stagg Award (1999); Mid-American Coach of the Year (1965); 6× Big Ten Coach of the Year (1972, 1976, 1980, 1982, 1985, 1989)

Records
- Most wins in Michigan history (194)
- College Football Hall of Fame; Inducted in 1993 (profile)

Glenn Edward "Bo" Schembechler Jr. (/ˈʃɛmbɛklər/ SHEM-bek-lər; April 1, 1929 – November 17, 2006) was an American college football player, coach, and athletics administrator. He served as the head football coach at Miami University from 1963 to 1968 and at the University of Michigan from 1969 to 1989, compiling a career record of 234 wins, 65 losses and 8 ties. Only Nick Saban, Joe Paterno and Tom Osborne have recorded 200 victories in fewer games as a coach in major college football. In his 21 seasons as the head coach of the Michigan Wolverines, Schembechler's teams amassed a record of 194–48–5 and won or shared 13 Big Ten Conference titles. Though his Michigan teams never won a national championship, in all but one season they finished ranked, and 16 times they placed in the final top ten of both major polls.

Schembechler played college football as a tackle at Miami University, where in 1949 and 1950 he was coached by Woody Hayes, for whom he served as an assistant coach at Ohio State University in 1952 and from 1958 to 1962. In his first ten years at Michigan, Schembechler's teams squared off in a fierce rivalry against Hayes's Buckeyes squads. During that stretch in the Michigan–Ohio State football rivalry, dubbed the "Ten-Year War," Hayes and Schembechler's teams won or shared the Big Ten Conference crown every season and usually each placed in the national rankings.

In 1988, Schembechler assumed the role of athletic director at Michigan, succeeding Don Canham, the man who hired him as football coach in 1969. Schembechler retired as head football coach after the 1989 season. His longtime assistants, Gary Moeller and Lloyd Carr, helmed the team for the next 18 years. Schembechler left the University of Michigan in 1990 to take a job as president of Major League Baseball's Detroit Tigers, which he held until 1992. He was inducted into the College Football Hall of Fame as a coach in 1993. During his later years, Schembechler remained in Southeast Michigan and hosted a sports radio show. He died in 2006 at the age of 77 on the eve of that year's Michigan–Ohio State football game, a historic No. 1 versus No. 2 showdown.

Outside of football, Schembechler came to posthumous public notoriety after 2018, when it was alleged that he was one of several high-ranking University of Michigan officials who did not respond to accusations of sexual assault against team doctor Robert Anderson. Anderson sexually assaulted more than 600 University of Michigan athletes, along with hundreds more individuals at other institutions.

== Early life ==
Schembechler was born and raised in Barberton, Ohio, a suburb of Akron. His nickname "Bo" came from his sister's attempts to say "brother" when they were young children. Schembechler's father was a firefighter. One of Schembechler's seminal experiences was seeing his father refuse to accept a stolen copy of a civil-service exam—despite the fact that the other applicant was reported to have received a stolen copy himself. Schembechler's father took the exam without having received the answers, missed one more question than the other applicant, and did not receive the promotion he coveted. Schembechler often told the story, saying the experience taught him more about integrity than any lecture ever could have.

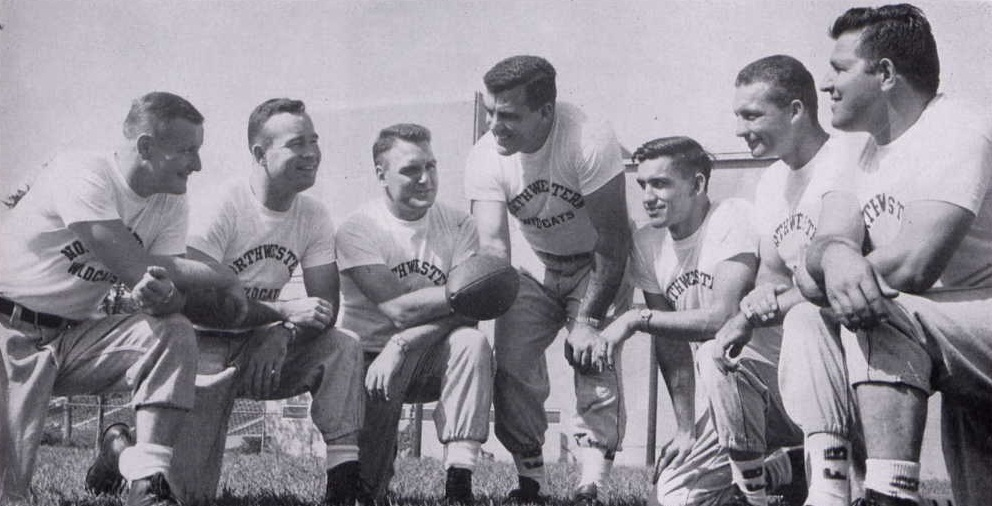
Schembechler (far left) as a member of Ara Parseghian's coaching staff at Northwestern in 1956

Schembechler attended Miami University in Oxford, Ohio, where he was a member of Sigma Alpha Epsilon fraternity. He played football under two legendary, and completely different, coaches. Sid Gillman, his first coach at Miami, was an innovative offensive mind and one of the fathers of the modern passing game. His concepts helped to form the foundation for football's West Coast offense. However, in early 1948, Gillman departed to become an assistant coach at Army, and was replaced by George Blackburn. Prior to Schembechler's last season, Blackburn left to join Gillman's coaching staff at Cincinnati, and he was replaced by Woody Hayes. The fiery Hayes embraced the run, eschewed the pass, and demanded tough, physical play from his linemen. Rather than innovation, Hayes stressed repetition—he wanted his players to run each play flawlessly. Over the next forty years, Hayes' impact on his young protege was clearly evident. Schembechler graduated from Miami in 1951 and earned his master's degree at Ohio State University in 1952 while working as a graduate assistant coach under Hayes, who had become OSU's head coach. After a tour of duty in the U.S. Army, Schembechler served as an assistant at Presbyterian College in 1954, followed by a year as freshman coach at Bowling Green. When Schembechler's former college teammate Ara Parseghian, Hayes' successor at Miami University, was hired as head coach at Northwestern in 1956, Schembechler joined him and spent the next two seasons there as a defensive assistant. In 1958, Hayes hired Schembechler to serve again on his staff at Ohio State. Schembechler spent five more years at Ohio State and became one of Hayes' most trusted assistants. During that time the two cemented their lifelong friendship. Schembechler was fond of recounting the number of times that Hayes "fired" him, only to send a graduate assistant to fetch him after tempers had calmed.

Schembechler, Hayes, Parseghian, and several of their "Cradle of Coaches" compatriots are the subject of the book Fields of Honor, written by coach John Pont's niece, Sally Pont.

== Miami (OH) University ==
In 1963, Schembechler returned to Miami University to become head coach of his alma mater. Over the next six seasons, Schembechler led the Redskins to a 40–17–3 record, winning a pair of Mid-American Conference titles and finishing second three times. The team's top season was 1966, as Miami went 9–1 overall. Miami's offense was led during those seasons by quarterbacks Ernie Kellermann and Bruce Matte.

Schembechler was a candidate vying to succeed Milt Bruhn as head coach at Wisconsin in 1967. Immediately after a 40-minute interview in which he was offended that the hiring committee didn't take his candidacy seriously, he contacted athletic director Ivy Williamson to withdraw his name from consideration. Assistant coach John Coatta, who was the favorite to replace Bruhn from the start, was promoted. Schembechler continued to coach at Miami for two more seasons. His negative experience was a major factor in his convincing Bob Knight to reject Wisconsin's offer to become men's basketball head coach in 1968.

== University of Michigan ==
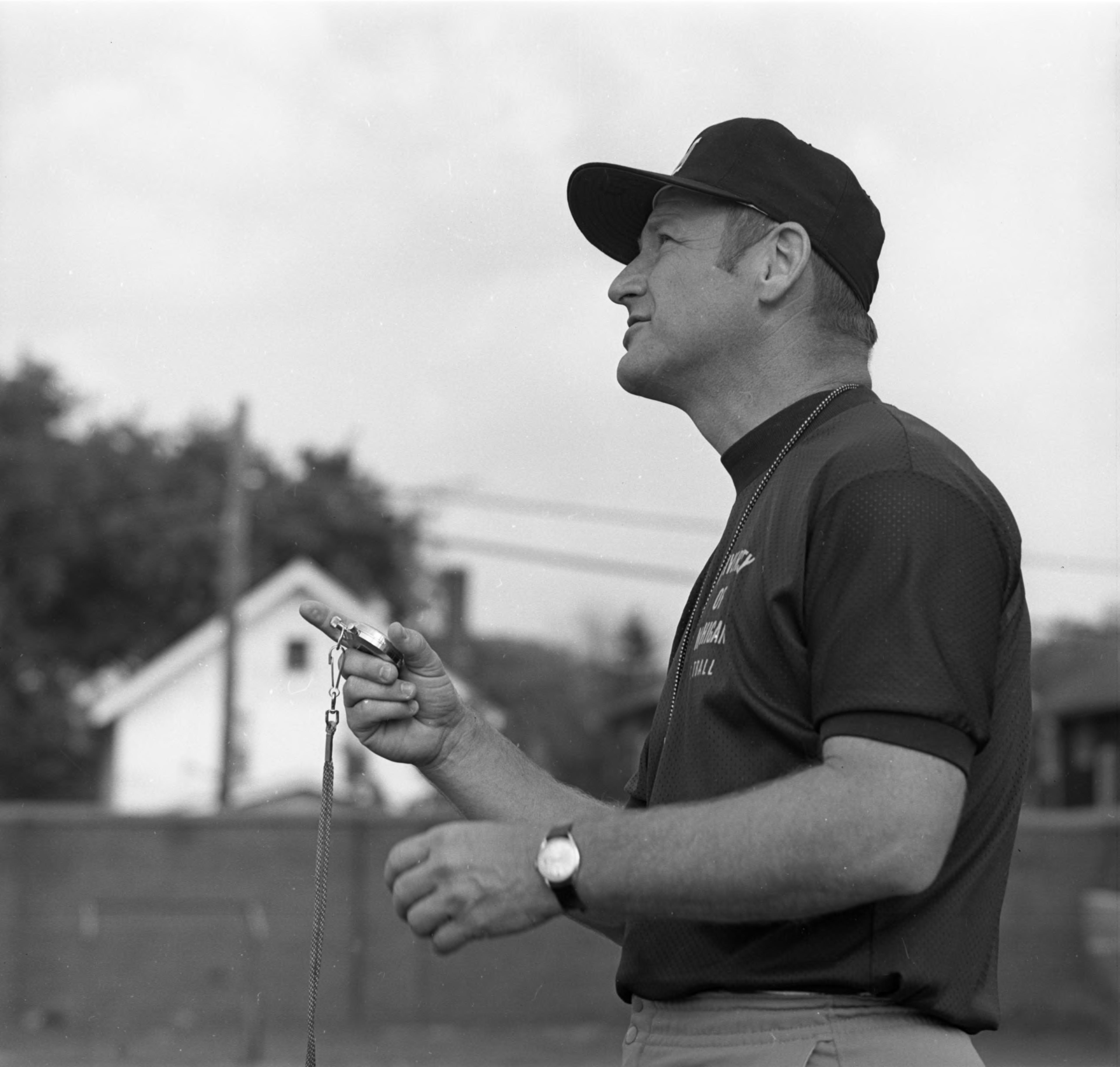
Schembechler at Michigan, 1969

Schembechler became Michigan's 15th head coach after the 1968 season, succeeding Bump Elliott. He was hired in fifteen minutes. It took athletic director Don Canham that long "to sense the intensity, the enthusiasm of a man destined to be a winner." Besides a stellar record at Miami he also "brought a unique five-man angle defense and a guarantee that he would make it work within five years." At Michigan, Schembechler became one of college football's greatest coaches. He won a school-record 194 games, lost only 48, and tied five for a winning percentage of .796. His teams never posted a losing season. In Big Ten Conference play, he had a record of 143–24–3 for a winning percentage of .850. His Michigan teams won or shared 13 Big Ten titles and made 10 Rose Bowl appearances. His 96–16–3 (.848) record during the 1970s was the best of any Division I coach. Schembechler led the Wolverines to a total of 17 bowl games, going 5–12 in 21 years, placing him ninth in all-time bowl appearances. He was voted national coach of the year in 1969 by both the American Football Coaches Association and the Football Writers Association of America.

Schembechler's greatest victory came in his first season, when he led the Wolverines to an upset victory over a standout Ohio State team coached by his old mentor, Woody Hayes. Hayes' Buckeyes dominated the series during the late 1950s and for most of the 1960s as Michigan fielded a number of uncharacteristically mediocre teams. In 1968, the year before Schembechler became head coach, Hayes made it clear how far Michigan had fallen behind its traditional rival, when the Wolverines lost 50–14. At the end of the game, Hayes decided to pursue a two-point conversion rather than a simple kick for an extra point. When Hayes was asked why he "went for two," he responded, "because they wouldn't let me go for three." The embarrassment of that outcome set the stage for the 1969 rematch.

In 1969, the Buckeyes entered the game as defending national champions and 17-point favorites with the top ranking in the country and a 22-game winning streak. Hayes' 1969 squad included five first-team All-Americans. But Schembechler's 7–2 Wolverines dominated a team Hayes later considered his best, beating Ohio State 24–12. In a single afternoon, Schembechler and his charges resurrected Michigan's football tradition and returned the program among college football's elite. Both Schembechler and Hayes, who remained personal friends until Hayes' death in 1987, agreed it was Hayes' best team and Schembechler's biggest victory. Michigan's win over Ohio State in 1969 is considered to be one of the greatest upsets in college football history and the most significant win for a Michigan team ever.

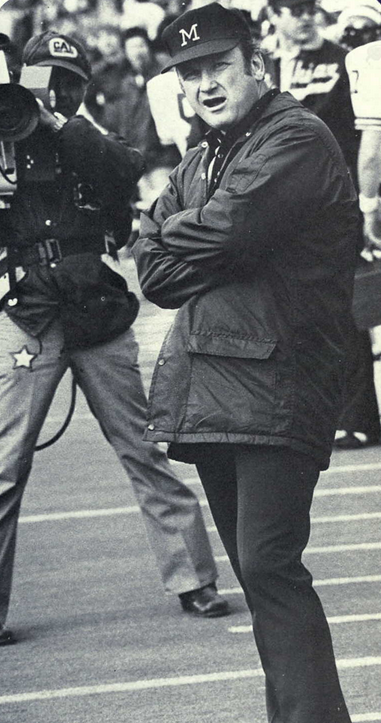
Schembechler from 1976 Michiganensian

The Wolverines and Buckeyes proceeded to engage in the Ten Year War. This elevated the Michigan–Ohio State football rivalry into one of college football's greatest annual grudge matches. For ten years the two dominated the Big 10, splitting ten conference titles between them and finishing second eight times. The Big Ten earned a nickname of "Big Two, Little Eight" during that era due to their dominance. After a decade of on-field stratagems, sideline antics, and locker room psychological ploys, Schembechler held a 5–4–1 advantage.

Schembechler's tenure at Michigan was also notable for the renewal of Michigan's rivalry with Notre Dame. Despite the fact that the two schools are located within 200 miles of one another and ranked first/second in both total wins and winning percentage in college football, they had not played each other since the 1940s. The resurrection of the rivalry was facilitated by Schembechler's close friendship with Ara Parseghian, Notre Dame's coach at the time of Bo's arrival. Schembechler, however, never had a chance to coach against his former mentor, as scheduling commitments prevented the series from resuming until 1978, after Parseghian had left Notre Dame and was succeeded by Dan Devine.

Despite Schembechler's success during the regular season, he was less successful in bowl games. His overall record was 5–12, which includes a 2–8 record in the Rose Bowl. The Wolverines lost the 1970 Rose Bowl, their first bowl game under Schembechler, while he was hospitalized after suffering a heart attack on the previous day. Michigan went on to lose their next six bowl games before winning five of the last ten they played under Schembechler. The only four of his 21 Michigan teams that did not play in a bowl, however, were a shade short of perfection, losing a total of three games while compiling a combined record of 39-3-1. One loss was by three points and a second was lost in the last seconds when a 33-yard FG attempt was ruled to be just wide of the goalposts.

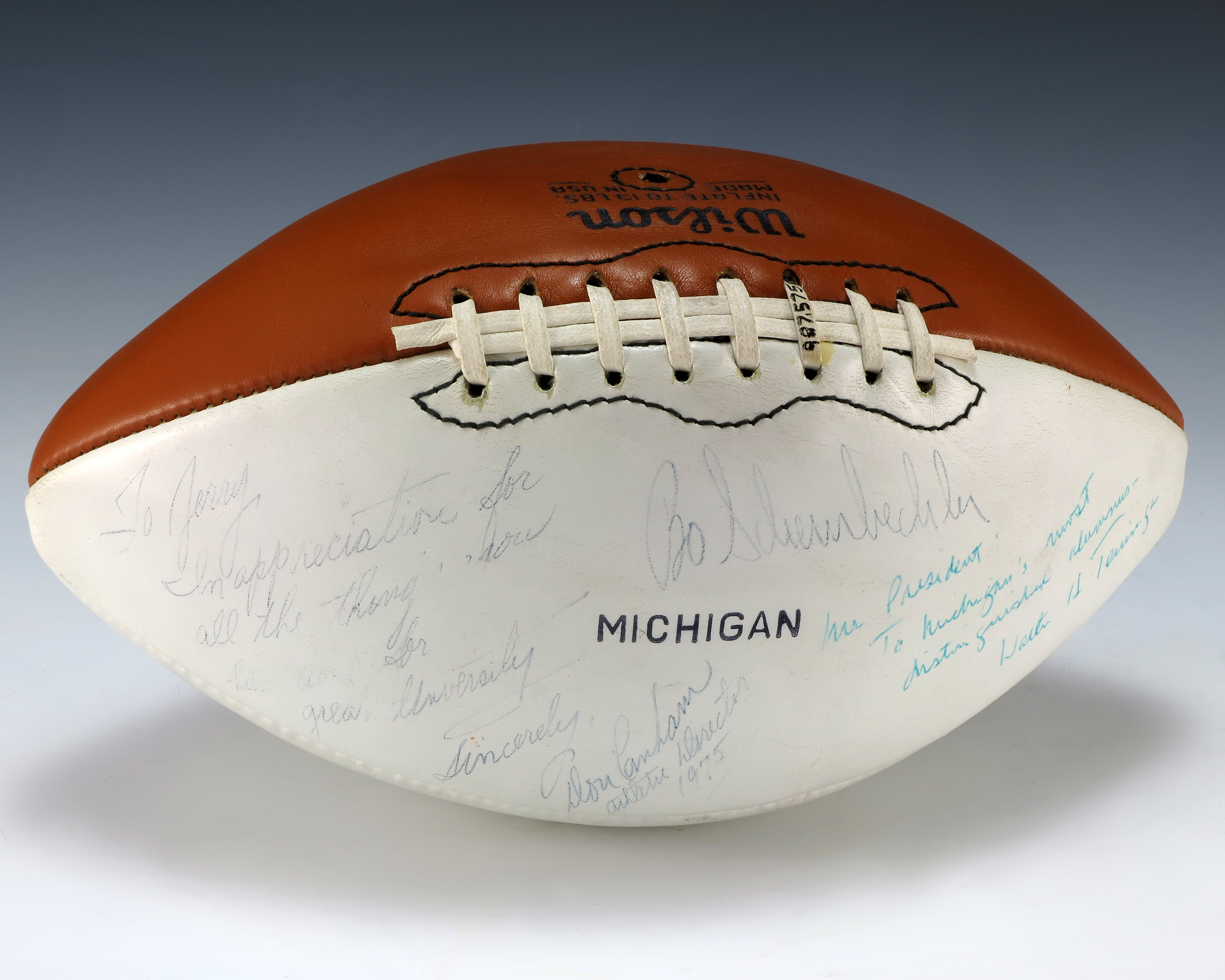
A football signed by Bo Schembechler, Don Canham, and Wally Teninga that was given to President Gerald Ford.

Following the 1980 season, Schembechler gained the first of his two Rose Bowl victories by beating the Washington Huskies. The 1980 Michigan team featured the talents of Anthony Carter, a three-time consensus All-American. In 1980 Michigan stumbled early in the season, losing two of its first three games. As a result of the two losses, Michigan was eliminated from consideration for college football's national championship, finishing 4th in the end-of-season polls. But Schembechler maintained that his first Rose Bowl champions were the country's best team by season's end. They did not allow a touchdown over the course of their last five games, giving up nine points total.

Perhaps spurred by Carter's success, Schembechler's teams began to pass more during the 1980s, but Schembechler never completely shed his image as a run-first offensive coach. (A favorite saying of Schembechler was that "there are three things that can happen when you pass, and two of them are bad.") At the same time, his teams continued to enjoy consistent success throughout the decade. Jim Harbaugh, a future NFL All-Pro quarterback and former head coach of the University of Michigan, led Schembechler's 1985 team to a 10–1–1 record, a 27–23 win over Nebraska in the Fiesta Bowl, and a No. 2 ranking in the final polls, the highest finish ever for one of Schembechler's teams. Schembechler's last two teams went to the Rose Bowl, splitting two games with USC.

Schembechler retired from coaching after the Rose Bowl in 1990. He decided to retire at the relatively young age of 60 because of his history of heart problems and was succeeded by Michigan's offensive coordinator Gary Moeller, whom he handpicked.

Schembechler was also the athletic director at Michigan from 1988 until early 1990. Just before the 1989 NCAA basketball tournament, men's basketball head coach Bill Frieder announced that he was taking the head coach position at Arizona State University, effective at the end of the season. Insisting on those in the program being dedicated to the school, Schembechler immediately fired Frieder and appointed assistant basketball coach Steve Fisher as interim head coach, while famously announcing that "a Michigan man is going to coach a Michigan team" in the NCAA tournament. The literal meaning of the Schembechler's quote was that only a current, 100 percent-committed university employee would coach the team, not Frieder, whose loyalties had just switched to Arizona State. Ironically, Frieder was an alumnus of Michigan, while Fisher was not. Fisher led Michigan to six straight victories in the tournament and the 1989 national championship. Schembechler witnessed the championship game, an 80–79 overtime cliffhanger vs. Seton Hall, two days after his 60th birthday (the semifinal victory over Big Ten rival Illinois was played on Schembechler's birthday). Fisher submitted Bill Frieder's name to receive the championship ring, however someone, likely from Schembechler's administration, removed his name. Schembechler would coach Michigan's Rose Bowl team in 1990 while having secretly accepted the role of President for the Detroit Tigers, publicly announcing the hire after the game.

=== "Those Who Stay Will Be Champions" ===
Schembechler inherited a program that had won only one Big Ten championship in the prior 18 seasons and had just suffered a humiliating 14-50 defeat to their rival in their last game. Upon taking over as head coach in 1969, Schembechler initiated a dramatic culture change centered on toughness and conditioning that contrasted with his even-tempered predecessor. By the time spring practice started, many players had already quit.

Schembechler posted a sign in the locker room that said "Those Who Stay Will Be CHAMPIONS". Schembechler's subsequent successes and legacy of propelling the Michigan football program to further national prominence immortalized his promise to his players after accepting the head coaching position at Michigan. Every Michigan football player who played for Bo Schembechler and stayed at Michigan for four years left Michigan with at least one Big Ten championship ring. Furthermore, not once did any Michigan player under Bo endure a losing season during his tenure.

=== Offer from Texas A&M ===
On January 15, 1982, Texas A&M offered Schembechler nearly $3 million for 10 years—the richest contract in the history of college athletics at that time—to become the school's football coach and athletic director. Schembechler turned it down. "Frankly, I've come to the conclusion that there are things more important in this world than money," Schembechler said. "For that reason, I've decided to stay at Michigan."

=== "The Team, the Team, the Team" ===
Prior to the 1983 season, Schembechler delivered a speech to his players that became one of the most famous in college football history. Filmed for a television documentary, the speech emphasized selfless play and collective effort:

We want the Big Ten championship and we're gonna win it as a team. They can throw out all those great backs, and great quarterbacks, and great defensive players throughout the country and in this conference, but there's gonna be one team that's gonna play solely as a team. No man is more important than the team. No coach is more important than the team. The team, the team, the team!

— Bo Schembechler, 1983

The philosophy was vindicated on November 19, 1983, when the No. 8 Wolverines defeated the No. 10 Ohio State Buckeyes 24–21 at Michigan Stadium, and the Wolverines went on to win three more Big Ten championships under Schembechler's tenure. The speech has since become a central part of the university's athletic identity, and a video of the address is featured in an exhibit at the College Football Hall of Fame.

== After Michigan ==
From 1990 to 1992, Schembechler was president of the Detroit Tigers of Major League Baseball. In 1991, he presided over the firing of Tigers' longtime broadcaster Ernie Harwell; the move was decried by fans and the press. Management at the Tigers' flagship radio station WJR later claimed responsibility for the sacking, but Schembechler and club owner Tom Monaghan were denounced for the decision. Schembechler was an opponent of female sports reporters in the men's locker room, defending Tigers pitcher Jack Morris, who told a female Detroit Free Press reporter in 1990, "I don't talk to women when I'm naked unless they're on top of me or I'm on top of them." Schembechler stated "no female member of my family would be inside a men's locker room regardless of their job description" and suggested "the whole thing was a scam orchestrated by you people to create a story." Schembechler was fired by the Tigers in early August 1992, via fax.

Schembechler never really found a way to retire. He maintained an office at the University of Michigan's football facility, which is named Schembechler Hall. His former assistants, Gary Moeller (1990–94) and Lloyd Carr (1995–2007), followed him as head coach. Schembechler was also active in numerous private charities. He was named a Lifetime Member of the Detroit Sports Media Association.

He also hosted a pre-game show "Big Ten Ticket" on the Detroit ABC affiliate, WXYZ-TV along with sports anchor Don Shane. It was devoted to his analysis of the Wolverines, the Michigan State Spartans and other Big Ten Conference teams.

At Michigan's annual spring commencement on April 30, 2005, Schembechler was awarded an honorary doctor of laws degree.

== Health problems ==
Schembechler had a long history of heart trouble. On December 31, 1969, the eve of his first Rose Bowl appearance, he suffered a heart attack, and had another in 1987 while he happened to be at University of Michigan Medical Center for tests. He had two quadruple heart bypass operations, the first in 1976 and the second following his second heart attack.

During a taping of the WXYZ-TV program Big Ten Ticket in late October 2006, Schembechler collapsed and was taken to the hospital. Following the episode, he had a heart pacemaker implanted into his chest to regulate his heartbeat. As late as a week before his death, he had stated his doctors were still adjusting the device, which covered about half his chest.

== Death ==
On Thursday, November 16, 2006, although he was not feeling well, Schembechler attended the funeral of his close friend and 1971 quarterback, Tom Slade. That night, Bo delivered his traditional Thursday night pep talk before the Ohio State game. According to The Detroit News: "Bo's speech was not about Ohio State, the Big Ten title or a national championship. The whole speech was about Tom Slade and how, if the players worked hard, listened to their coaches and stuck together as teammates, one day they might be as good a Michigan man as Slade. That was the goal at Michigan, not national championships." Schembechler finished by exhorting them to remember "the team, the team, the team!"

The next day, on November 17, 2006, Schembechler collapsed in a restroom stall at WXYZ-TV just prior to the taping of Big Ten Ticket around 9:15 am. He was taken to Providence Hospital in Southfield, Michigan where he was pronounced dead. He was 77 years old. At a press conference a few hours after his death, it was reported by his doctor, Dr. Kim Eagle of the University of Michigan Health System, that his death was from the terminal stage of heart disease, where the heart muscle itself does not respond to the pacemaker, a common cause of death for persons afflicted with severe heart disease.

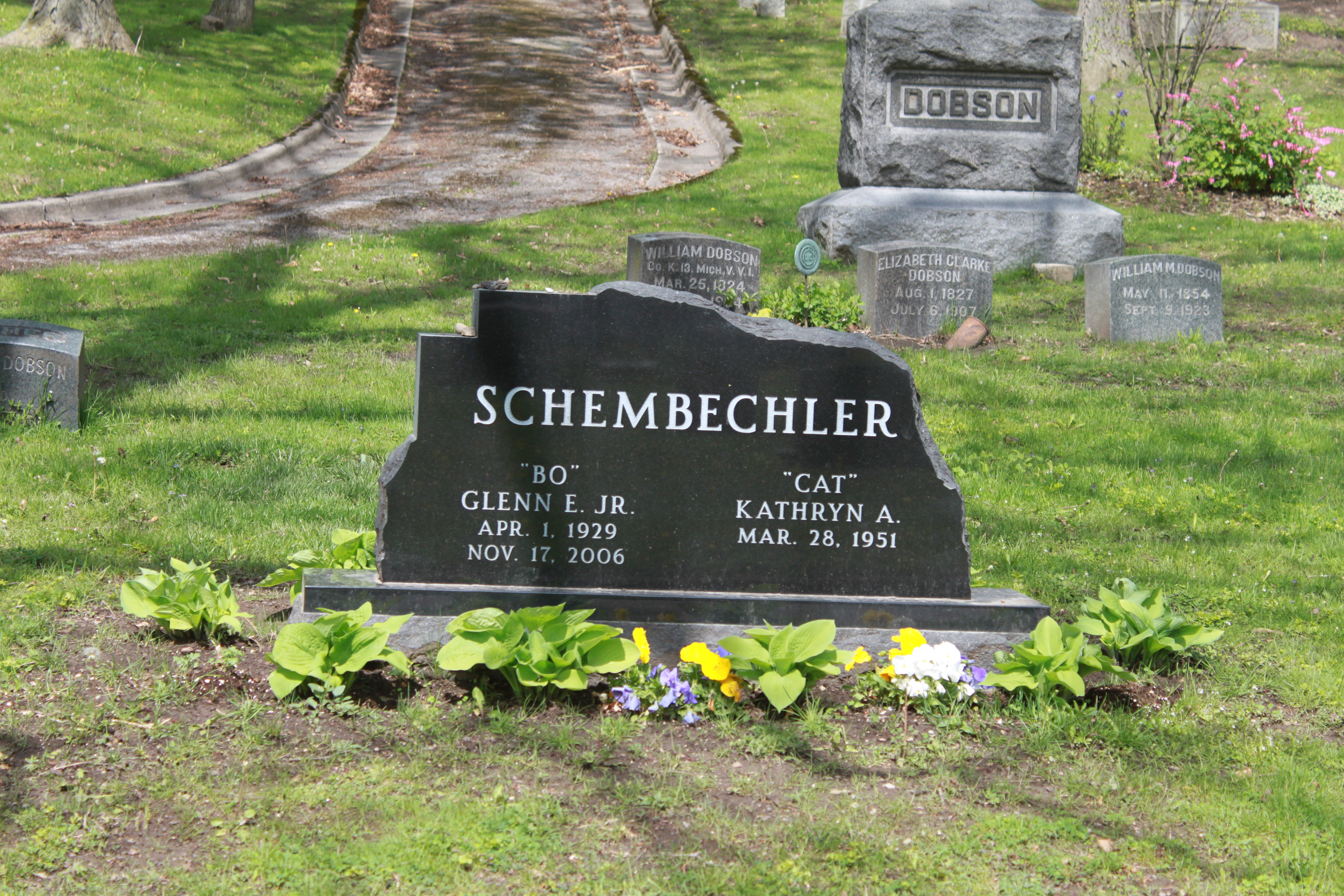
Bo Schembechler grave, Forest Hill Cemetery

Schembechler died the day before one of the biggest games in the history of the Michigan–Ohio State football rivalry. He was not planning to attend the November 18 game in Columbus. Instead, Bo and his wife, Cathy, had packed the car and had planned to drive to suburban Dayton, Ohio to watch the game with his former Miami teammate and friend, Bill Gunlock.

The university's Regents approved a plan for the renovation and expansion of Michigan Stadium on the day of Schembechler's death.

On November 21, 2006, the University of Michigan held a memorial service for Schembechler in Michigan Stadium. Approximately 20,000 fans, ex-players and coaches including former Schembechler player and assistant coach and then LSU head football coach Les Miles were in attendance, as well as former Ohio State head coaches Earle Bruce and John Cooper, along with then Ohio State head coach Jim Tressel and staff. Schembechler is interred at Forest Hill Cemetery in Ann Arbor, Michigan.

Before his death, Schembechler had agreed to be an honorary pallbearer for former Michigan Wolverine and University of Michigan alumnus President Gerald Ford. Ford, himself a center at Michigan in the 1930s, died on December 26, 2006. A pew inside Washington National Cathedral was draped with a University of Michigan stadium blanket in Schembechler's memory.

== Role in sexual assault scandal ==
Beginning in 2018, hundreds of former student-athletes who played at the University of Michigan have come forward with allegations of inappropriate and unwanted medical treatment by university doctor Robert Anderson. Anderson was employed at the university from 1966 to 2003, and died in 2008. After many lawsuits, an independent investigation was conducted by WilmerHale, LLP. Their 240-page report stated that over 600 former student-athletes at the University of Michigan experienced these assaults.

One former player claims Schembechler told him to "toughen up" when he reported an incident of Anderson fondling his testicles during an examination.

In June 2021, Schembechler's son Matt Schembechler came forward, saying he was molested at age ten by Anderson during a routine physical in the 1960s, and that Schembechler went to "great lengths" to ensure Anderson kept his job after Matt's mother told AD Don Canham, who was ready to fire Anderson before Coach Schembechler's intervention. Upon telling his father what happened, Matt said: "That was the first time he closed-fist punched me. It knocked me all the way across the kitchen." Schembechler's other son (and Matt's younger half-brother), Glenn Schembechler, refused to believe Matt's version and stated, "I can tell you unequivocally no one ever told Bo", because in his opinion, "Bo would have done something."

== Personal life ==
After Schembechler married Mildred (Millie) in 1968, he adopted her three sons: Donald (Chip), Geoffrey, and Matthew. Then, Schembechler and Millie had a son, Glenn III (Shemy). Millie Schembechler died August 19, 1992, at University Hospital in Ann Arbor, Michigan, after an eight-month battle with a rare form of cancer. She was 63.

Shemy Schembechler later served as an assistant director of recruiting for the Michigan football team until racist social posts resulted in him leaving the University of Michigan's staff in May 2023.

== Head coaching record ==
Year	Team	Overall	Conference	Standing	Bowl/playoffs	Coaches^{#}	AP^{°}
Miami Redskins (Mid-American Conference) (1963–1968)
1963	Miami	5–3–2	4–1–1	2nd			
1964	Miami	6–3–1	4–2	T–2nd			
1965	Miami	7–3	5–1	T–1st			
1966	Miami	9–1	5–1	T–1st			
1967	Miami	6–4	4–2	T–3rd			
1968	Miami	7–3	5–1	2nd			
Miami:		40–17–3	27–8–1				
Michigan Wolverines (Big Ten Conference) (1969–1989)
1969	Michigan	8–3	6–1	T–1st	L Rose	8	9
1970	Michigan	9–1	6–1	2nd		7	9
1971	Michigan	11–1	8–0	1st	L Rose	4	6
1972	Michigan	10–1	7–1	T–1st		6	6
1973	Michigan	10–0–1	7–0–1	T–1st		6	6
1974	Michigan	10–1	7–1	T–1st		5	3
1975	Michigan	8–2–2	7–1	2nd	L Orange	8	8
1976	Michigan	10–2	7–1	T–1st	L Rose	3	3
1977	Michigan	10–2	7–1	T–1st	L Rose	8	9
1978	Michigan	10–2	7–1	T–1st	L Rose	5	5
1979	Michigan	8–4	6–2	3rd	L Gator	19	18
1980	Michigan	10–2	8–0	1st	W Rose	4	4
1981	Michigan	9–3	6–3	T–3rd	W Astro-Bluebonnet	10	12
1982	Michigan	8–4	8–1	1st	L Rose	15	
1983	Michigan	9–3	8–1	2nd	L Sugar	9	8
1984	Michigan	6–6	5–4	T–6th	L Holiday		
1985	Michigan	10–1–1	6–1–1	2nd	W Fiesta	2	2
1986	Michigan	11–2	7–1	T–1st	L Rose	7	8
1987	Michigan	8–4	5–3	4th	W Hall of Fame	18	19
1988	Michigan	9–2–1	7–0–1	1st	W Rose	4	4
1989	Michigan	10–2	8–0	1st	L Rose	8	7
Michigan:		194–48–5	143–24–3				
Total:		234–65–8					
National championship Conference title Conference division title or championship game berth
^{#}Rankings from final Coaches Poll.; ^{°}Rankings from final AP Poll.

== Coaching tree ==
Played under:

- Sid Gillman: Miami (OH)
- George Blackburn: Miami (OH)
- Woody Hayes: Miami (OH)

Coached under:

- Woody Hayes: Ohio State University
- Bill Crutchfield: Presbyterian
- Doyt Perry: Bowling Green
- Ara Parseghian: Northwestern University

Assistant coaches who became head coaches:

- Cam Cameron: Indiana (1997–2001), Miami Dolphins (2007)
- Lloyd Carr: Michigan (1995–2007)
- Jack Harbaugh: Western Michigan (1982–1986), Western Kentucky (1989–2002)
- Bill McCartney: Colorado (1982–1994)
- Dave McClain: Ball State (1971–1977), Wisconsin (1978–1985)
- Frank Maloney: Syracuse (1974–1980)
- George Mans: Eastern Michigan (1974–1975)
- Les Miles: Oklahoma State (2001–2004), LSU (2005–2016), Kansas (2019–2021)
- Gary Moeller: Illinois (1977–1979), Michigan (1990–1994), Detroit Lions (2000)
- Don Nehlen: Bowling Green (1968–1976), West Virginia (1980–2000)
- Tom Reed: Miami (OH) (1978–1982), NC State (1983–1985)
- Paul Schudel: Ball State (1985–1994), Central Connecticut State (2001–2003) (Schudel also played for Schembechler at Miami (OH)
- Larry Smith: Tulane (1976–1979), Arizona (1980–1986), Southern California (1987–1992), Missouri (1994–2000)
- Chuck Stobart: Toledo (1977–1981), Utah (1982–1984), Memphis State (1989–1994)
- Bob Sutton: Army (1991–1999)
- Dick Tomey: Hawaii (1977–1986); Arizona (1987–2000); San Jose State (2005–2009)
- Elliot Uzelac: Western Michigan (1975–1981), Navy (1987–1989)
- Ron Vanderlinden: Maryland (1997–2000)
- Jim Young: Arizona (1973–1976), Purdue (1977–1981), Army (1983–1990)
- Mike Hankwitz: Arizona (2003), Colorado (2005)
- John Mackovic: Wake Forest (1978–1980), Kansas City Chiefs (1983–1986), Illinois (1988–1991), Texas (1992–1997), Arizona (2001–2003)

Former players who went on to become head coaches

- Jim Harbaugh: San Diego (2004–2006), Stanford (2007–2010), San Francisco 49ers (2011–2014), Michigan (2015–2024), Los Angeles Chargers (2024-present)
- Curt Mallory: Indiana State (2017–present)
- Les Miles: Oklahoma State (2001–2004), LSU (2005–2016), Kansas (2019-2020)
- Mike Hankwitz: Arizona (2003), Colorado (2005)
- Dave Elliott: Morningside (1996–2000)
- Joe Novak: Northern Illinois (1996-2007)

Although neither served as a head coach, Dave Brandon, Jim Hackett, and Warde Manuel played under Schembechler and went on to become University of Michigan's athletic directors.

== See also ==
- List of college football career coaching wins leaders
- List of presidents of the American Football Coaches Association
- List of celebrities who own wineries and vineyards
