= 1980 Michigan Wolverines football team =

American college football season

1980 Michigan Wolverines football

Big Ten champion Rose Bowl champion

Rose Bowl, W 23–6 vs. Washington
- Conference: Big Ten Conference

Ranking
- Coaches: No. 4
- AP: No. 4
- Record: 10–2 (8–0 Big Ten)
- Head coach: Bo Schembechler (12th season)
- Defensive coordinator: Bill McCartney (4th season)
- MVP: Anthony Carter
- Captains: Andy Cannavino; George Lilja
- Home stadium: Michigan Stadium

1980 Big Ten Conference football standings
	Conf.					Overall
Team	W		L		T	W		L		T
No. 4 Michigan $	8	–	0	–	0	10	–	2	–	0
No. 15 Ohio State	7	–	1	–	0	9	–	3	–	0
No. 17 Purdue	7	–	1	–	0	9	–	3	–	0
Iowa	4	–	4	–	0	4	–	7	–	0
Minnesota	4	–	5	–	0	5	–	6	–	0
Indiana	3	–	5	–	0	6	–	5	–	0
Wisconsin	3	–	5	–	0	4	–	7	–	0
Illinois	3	–	5	–	0	3	–	7	–	1
Michigan State	2	–	6	–	0	3	–	8	–	0
Northwestern	0	–	9	–	0	0	–	11	–	0
$ – Conference champion; Rankings from AP Poll

The 1980 Michigan Wolverines football team was an American football team that represented the University of Michigan in the 1980 Big Ten Conference football season. In their 12th season under head coach Bo Schembechler, the Wolverines compiled a 10–2 record (8–0 against conference opponents), won the Big Ten Conference championship, defeated Washington in the 1981 Rose Bowl, and outscored all opponents by a total of 322 to 129. The Rose Bowl victory was Schembechler's first in a bowl game, following seven bowl games losses. After falling out of the rankings for four weeks, the 1980 Wolverines ended up being ranked No. 4 in both the AP and UPI polls.

After starting the season 1–2 with losses to Notre Dame (on a last-second field goal) and South Carolina (featuring Heisman Trophy winner George Rogers), the defense gathered strength, scored three consecutive shutouts, and did not allow a touchdown in the final 22 quarters of the season. The defense was led by linebacker and co-captain Andy Cannavino and defensive linemen Mike Trgovac and Mel Owens.

The team's statistical leaders included quarterback John Wangler with 1,522 passing yards, running back Butch Woolfolk with 1,042 rushing yards, and wide receiver and All-Americans Anthony Carter with 818 receiving yards and 84 points scored.

Two Michigan players (Anthony Carter and center George Lilja) received first-team honors on the 1980 All-America college football team, and nine, including all five interior offensive linemen (Lilja, Ed Muransky, Bubba Paris, Kurt Becker, and John Powers), received first-team honors on the 1980 All-Big Ten Conference football team.

== Schedule ==
Date	Opponent	Rank	Site	TV	Result	Attendance
September 13	Northwestern	No. 11	Michigan Stadium; Ann Arbor, MI (rivalry)		W 17–10	100,824
September 20	at No. 8 Notre Dame*	No. 14	Notre Dame Stadium; Notre Dame, IN (rivalry)	ONTV	L 27–29	59,075
September 27	South Carolina*	No. 17	Michigan Stadium; Ann Arbor, MI		L 14–17	104,213
October 4	California*		Michigan Stadium; Ann Arbor, MI	ONTV	W 38–13	104,621
October 11	Michigan State		Michigan Stadium; Ann Arbor, MI (rivalry)		W 27–23	105,263
October 18	at Minnesota		Memorial Stadium; Minneapolis, MN (Little Brown Jug)		W 37–14	56,297
October 25	Illinois^{†}		Michigan Stadium; Ann Arbor, MI (rivalry)	ABC	W 45–14	105,109
November 1	at Indiana	No. 18	Memorial Stadium; Bloomington, IN		W 35–0	52,071
November 8	at Wisconsin	No. 12	Camp Randall Stadium; Madison, WI		W 24–0	69,560
November 15	No. 16 Purdue	No. 11	Michigan Stadium; Ann Arbor, MI	ABC	W 26–0	105,831
November 22	at No. 5 Ohio State	No. 10	Ohio Stadium; Columbus, OH (The Game)	ABC	W 9–3	88,827
January 1, 1981	vs. No. 16 Washington*	No. 5	Rose Bowl; Pasadena, CA (Rose Bowl)	NBC	W 23–6	104,863
*Non-conference game; ^{†}Homecoming; Rankings from AP Poll released prior to the game

== Season summary ==
=== Preseason ===
The 1979 Michigan Wolverines football team compiled an 8–4 record, including a loss to unranked North Carolina in the 1979 Gator Bowl. It was the first time Michigan was not ranked in the top 10 since Bo Schembechler took over as coach in 1969.

The 1980 season saw turnover among coach Schembechler's assistant coaches. Three assistant coaches from the 1979 team left prior to the 1980 season. In December 1979, Don Nehlen was hired as the head coach at West Virginia. In January 1980, Dennis Brown, who coached linebackers at Michigan, left to join Nehlen's staff. And in March 1980, Jack Harbaugh, Schembechler's defensive backs coach, left to become Stanford's defensive coordinator.

In March 1980, Michigan hired Gary Moeller to rejoin Schembechler's staff. Moeller had been a Schembechler assistant for years before serving as Illinois' head coach from 1977 to 1979. He was fired by Illinois after the 1979 season. Michigan also hired two of Moeller's assistant coaches from Illinois: Lloyd Carr and Tim Davis.

In the AP's 1980 preseason poll, Michigan was picked to finish third in the Big Ten. The AP picked Ohio State (led by Art Schlichter) as the No. 1 team in the country, and Purdue (led by Mark Herrmann) at No. 9, with Michigan ranked No. 12.

Linebacker Andy Cannavino and center George Lilja were selected as co-captains of the 1980 team.

=== Northwestern ===
Week 1: Northwestern at Michigan

Team	1	2	3	4	Total
Northwestern	0	3	0	7	10
• Michigan	3	7	0	7	17

- Date: September 13
- Location: Ann Arbor, MI
- Game attendance: 100,824

Scoring summary
1	MICH	Ali Haji-Sheikh 33-yard field goal	MICH 3-0
2	NW	Jay Anderson 35-yard field goal	TIE 3-3
2	MICH	Anthony Carter 17-yard pass from Rich Hewlett (Haji-Sheikh kick)	MICH 10-3
4	NW	Dave Mishler 1-yard run (Anderson kick)	TIE 10-10
4	MICH	Carter 2-yard pass from Hewlett (Haji-Sheikh kick)	MICH 17-10

On September 13, Michigan defeated Northwestern, 17–10, before a crowd of 100,824 at Michigan Stadium. The game began in a heavy rain that turned into a downpour for most of the first half.

On the first play from scrimmage, Northwestern fumbled the ball, and Mike Trgovac recovered the ball for Michigan at the Northwestern 34-yard line. Ali Haji-Sheikh kicked a 33-yard field goal to give Michigan an early lead. However, Michigan's next two drives ended with fumbles, and in the second quarter Northwestern tied the game on a 35-yard field goal by Jay Anderson.

Michigan's next drive stalled, but as Michigan punted on fourth down, Northwestern was penalized for having an extra player on the field. After the penalty, quarterback Rich Hewlett threw a 17-yard touchdown pass to Anthony Carter. When the Wolverines got the ball back with 1:21 remaining the first half, coach Schembechler put John Wangler into the game in place of Hewlett. Wangler led the Wolverines 45 yards down the field to Northwestern's 35-yard line, but Haji-Sheikh missed a 52-yard field goal.

In the third quarter, Northwestern mounted a seven-minute drive that was stopped only when Brian Carpenter intercepted a pass at the five-yard line. Michigan was forced to punt after three plays, and Northwestern again drove the ball down the field, this time scoring on a one-yard run by Dave Mishler.

Northwestern, in the midst of a 34-game losing streak, dominated a third quarter in which Michigan ran only three plays and had the ball for two minutes and thirty seconds. As Michigan's offense stalled, Michigan fans began booing Hewlett, a sophomore who had won the starting job from John Wangler, a popular veteran who had been injured at the end of the prior season. With the game tied, 10-10, the Michigan fans began chants of "We Want Wangler."

Michigan was finally able to score after Andy Cannavino fell on a Northwestern fumble at the Wildcats' 23-yard line. Hewlett threw a 23-yard touchdown pass to Anthony Carter in the left corner of the end zone, and Michigan led, 17–10. In the final three minutes of the game, Northwestern drove the ball from its own 27 to the Michigan 7, converting five times on fourth down, but Cannavino intercepted a pass on fourth down.

After the game, Hewlett said he tried not to pay attention to the chants calling for Wangler, and Bo Schembechler said, "I don't care who they call for. You know that won't dictate what I do."

=== Notre Dame ===
Week 2: Michigan at Notre Dame

Team	1	2	3	4	Total
Michigan	0	14	7	6	27
• Notre Dame	0	14	6	9	29

- Date: September 20
- Location: South Bend, IN
- Game attendance: 51,705

Scoring summary
2	ND	Phil Carter 6-yard run (Harry Oliver kick)	ND 7-0
2	ND	Pete Holohan 10-yard pass from Mike Courey (Oliver kick)	ND 14-0
2	MICH	Lawrence Ricks 8-yard pass from John Wangler (Ali Haji-Sheikh kick)	ND 14-7
2	MICH	Norm Betts 10-yard pass from Wangler (Haji-Sheikh kick)	TIE 14-14
3	MICH	Stan Edwards 3-yard run (Haji-Sheikh kick)	MICH 21-14
3	ND	Kimm 49-yard interception return (kick failed)	MICH 21-20
4	ND	Carter 4-yard run (pass failed)	ND 26-21
4	MICH	Craig Dunaway 1-yard pass from Wangler (pass failed)	MICH 27-26
4	ND	Oliver 51-yard field goal	ND 29-27

In the second week of the season, Michigan played Notre Dame in South Bend. After a scoreless first quarter, Notre Dame took a 14–0 lead in the second quarter. John Wangler replaced Rich Hewlett in the second quarter, and threw two touchdown passes in the span of 1:19 to tie the game, 14-14, at halftime. In the second half, Anthony Carter returned the opening kickoff 67 yards to the Notre Dame 32-yard line, and Michigan scored on a two-yard run by Stanley Edwards. Notre Dame scored a touchdown (but missed the extra point) with 1:03 left in the third quarter on a 49-yard interception return of a Wangler pass. The last three minutes of the game proved to be one of the most exciting finishes in the Michigan-Notre Dame rivalry. With 3:03 left in the game, Notre Dame scored to take a 26–21 lead (an attempted two-point conversion failed). On the next drive, Butch Woolfolk ran 36 yards on a trap play, taking the ball to the Notre Dame four-yard line with less than a minute to play. Wangler threw a pass to Woolfolk in the end zone that was tipped and caught by Michigan tight end, Craig Dunaway, to give the Wolverines a 27–26 lead with 41 seconds left. After a touchback, Notre Dame took over on its own 20-yard line with 40 seconds left. In five plays, Notre Dame moved the ball to the Michigan 41-yard line. Notre Dame's drive was aided by a controversial pass interference call against Michigan of which Coach Schembechler said after the game, "It was the key play, without it, they wouldn't have scored at all." And on the final play of the game, Notre Dame placekicker Harry Oliver kicked an improbable 51-yard field into a strong wind to give Notre Dame the 29–27 victory. Notre Dame coach Dan Devine performed the sign of the cross as Oliver's kick left his foot, and Oliver said, "This is by far the greatest moment of my life. I have to thank God and Our Lady, God had to be with me." Schembechler said after the game, "I'm proud of the way we came back. We had as much right to win as they did. But they hung in there and they had the last shot. Time just ran out."

=== South Carolina ===
Week 3: South Carolina at Michigan

Team	1	2	3	4	Total
• South Carolina	0	3	7	7	17
Michigan	0	14	0	0	14

- Date: September 27
- Location: Ann Arbor, MI
- Game attendance: 104,213

Scoring summary
2	SC	Eddie Leopard 26-yard field goal	SC 3-0
2	MICH	Anthony Carter 9-yard pass from John Wangler (Ali Haji-Sheikh kick)	MICH 7-3
2	MICH	Carter 3-yard pass from Wangler (Haji-Sheikh kick)	MICH 14-3
3	SC	George Rogers 2-yard run (Leopard kick)	MICH 14-10
4	SC	Johnnie Wright 1-yard run (Leopard kick)	SC 17-14

Michigan faced South Carolina and eventual 1980 Heisman Trophy winner George Rogers in the third week of the season. The press deemed South Carolina to be a heavy underdog going into the game. One writer noted, "Opponents like South Carolina are expected to be patsies. No trouble to beat." Consistent with expectations, Michigan took a 14–3 lead into halftime on a pair of touchdown passes from John Wangler to Anthony Carter. On the first drive of the second half, Michigan drove the ball to South Carolina's 8-yard line and appeared to be poised to take a 21–3 lead. However, on first and goal, Stan Edwards fumbled the ball into the endzone, and South Carolina recovered. South Carolina drove the ball 80 years for a touchdown to tighten the score to 14–10. On the ensuing drive, Michigan faced a fourth down with one yard to go at its own 29-yard line. Michigan faked the punt, but Stan Edwards was stopped for no gain. South Carolina responded with its second touchdown on the short field and took a 17–14 lead. After the game, Coach Schembechler blamed himself for the loss and the fake punt call. He said, "It was that a coach didn't have confidence in his defense. Hey, I've got to start realizing our defense isn't that bad. We should have punted ..." Late in the fourth quarter, Michigan had a chance to tie the game with a field goal, but opted to go for the touchdown on a pass play that was tipped off the hands of Anthony Carter. On not kicking the field goal, Schembechler said, "My players wouldn't want a tie in a non-conference game." South Carolina's offense was led by its tailback (and Heisman Trophy winner) George Rogers, who gained 142 yards on 36 carries.

With the loss to South Carolina, Michigan was 1-2 and had lost 5 of its last 6 games. It was the first time Michigan had lost consecutive non-conference games since 1967.

=== California ===
Week 4: California at Michigan

Team	1	2	3	4	Total
California	0	3	10	0	13
• Michigan	7	10	0	21	38

- Date: October 4
- Location: Ann Arbor, MI
- Game attendance: 104,621
- Game weather: Cloudy

Scoring summary
1	MICH	Lawrence Ricks 6-yard run (Ali Haji-Sheikh kick)	MICH 7-0
2	MICH	Haji-Sheikh 26-yard field goal	MICH 10-0
2	CAL	Mick Luckhurst 45-yard field goal	MICH 10-3
2	MICH	Stan Edwards 1-yard run (Haji-Sheikh kick)	MICH 17-3
3	CAL	Michael Buggs 25-yard pass from Rich Campbell (Luckhurst kick)	MICH 17-10
3	CAL	Luckhurst 43-yard field goal	MICH 17-13
4	MICH	Ricks 2-yard run (Haji-Sheikh kick)	MICH 24-13
4	MICH	Edwards 1-yard run (Haji-Sheikh kick)	MICH 31-13
4	MICH	Butch Woolfolk 1-yard run (Haji-Sheikh kick)	MICH 38-13

On October 4, Michigan defeated California, 38–13, in front of 104,621 spectators at Michigan Stadium. The game was close for the first three quarters, as Cal's Heisman Trophy candidate, quarterback Rich Campbell, completed 22 of 34 passes (including 15 for 15 in the second half) for 249 yards. But three fourth-quarter touchdowns gave Michigan a 25-point margin of victory. Michigan gained 388 rushing yards in the game, including 184 yards by Lawrence Ricks and 127 yards by Stan Edwards. After the game, Schembechler noted that respect for Cal quarterback Campbell led Michigan to emphasize the run: "Our intention was to control the ball and keep our defense off the field. You won't see that kind of running much more this season. . . . Campbell dictated our offense. Our strategy was to keep him off the field. You're never out of the woods with Campbell."

=== Michigan State ===
Week 5: Michigan State at Michigan

Team	1	2	3	4	Total
Michigan State	3	10	0	10	23
• Michigan	10	3	7	7	27

- Date: October 11
- Location: Ann Arbor, MI
- Game attendance: 105,263
- TV announcers (ON TV Sports): Larry Adderly, Jim Brandstatter

Scoring summary
1		MICH	Ali Haji-Sheikh 25-yard field goal	MICH 3-0
1		MICH	Lawrence Ricks 1-yard run (Haji-Sheikh kick)	MICH 10-0
1		MSU	Morten Andersen 49-yard field goal	MICH 10-3
2		MSU	John Leister 7-yard run (Andersen kick)	TIE 10-10
2		MICH	Haji-Sheik 29-yard field goal	MICH 13-10
2		MSU	Andersen 57-yard field goal	TIE 13-13
3	4:11	MICH	Anthony Carter 4-yard pass from John Wangler (Haji-Sheikh kick)	MICH 20-13
4		MSU	Andersen 35-yard field goal	MICH 20-16
4	10:45	MICH	Craig Dunaway 8-yard pass from Wangler (Haji-Sheikh kick)	MICH 27-16
4		MSU	Anthony Ellis 4-yard run (Andersen kick)	MICH 27-23

On October 11, Michigan defeated Michigan State, 27–23, before a crowd of 105,263 at Michigan Stadium. Michigan State was led by first-year head coach Muddy Waters.

In the first quarter, John Wangler led Michigan on a 50-yard, 10-play drive, but the Wolverines stalled at the Michigan State seven-yard line. Michigan settled for a 25-yard field goal from Ali Haji-Sheikh. On the next play from scrimmage, Andy Cannavino tipped a John Leister pass, and Marion Body grabbed it for an interception. Michigan took over on the Spartans' 23-yard line, and Wangler threw a 22-yard completion to Anthony Carter at the one-yard line. Lawrence Ricks ran for the touchdown, and Michigan led, 10–0. In the closing minutes of the first quarter, Leister led the Spartans on a 49-yard drive ending with a 49-yard field goal by Morten Andersen.

In the second quarter, Leister threw a long bomb to Ted Jones at Michigan's 22-yard line, but Cannavino forced a Spartan fumble on the next play and Michigan recovered the ball. Later in the second quarter, Leister ran seven yards on fourth down for a touchdown to tie the score at 10–10. With two minutes left in the half, Wangler passed to tight end Craig Dunaway for a 55-yard gain. When Michigan stalled, Haji-Sheikh kicked his second field goal of the game. With less than a minute left in the half, Michigan State moved the ball on two quick passes to Michigan's 40-yard line, and Morten Andersen kicked a school record 57-yard field goal. Leister passed for 160 yards in the first half.

In the third quarter, Haji-Sheikh kicked a 26-yard field goal, but the officials called a personal foul for roughing the kicker. Michigan accepted the penalty for a first down at the nine-yard line, and three plays later, Wangler threw a five-yard touchdown pass to Carter in the corner of the end zone. When questioned about the call after the game, Schembechler grinned and said, "So old Bo isn't too dumb is he?"

On the first play of the fourth quarter, Carl Williams intercepted a Wangler pass at the Michigan 27-yard line. Michigan's defense held, and Andersen kicked his third field goal, a 35-yarder. Michigan then drove 80 yards led by two runs totaling 49 yards from Stan Edwards. Wangler concluded the drive with an eight-yard touchdown pass to Craig Dunaway. The Spartans responded with their own 73-yard drive, Anthony Ellis scoring on a four-yard run with seven minutes to play. Later in the quarter, Michigan called a fake field goal, but Rich Hewlett was tackled for a loss. The Spartans, trailing by four points, had a final opportunity to score with less than two minutes remaining, but Cannavino intercepted a Leister pass (on a tip from Jim Herrmann) to seal the victory.

Michigan out-gained Michigan State by a total of 374 yards to 334. Running back Butch Woolfolk led Michigan's backs with 136 yards on 29 carries. Edwards added 93 yards on 16 carries. Craig Dunaway caught two passes for 63 yards.

A few highlights from this game were used in the 1983 film The Big Chill.

=== Minnesota ===
Week 6: Michigan at Minnesota

Team	1	2	3	4	Total
• Michigan	7	16	7	7	37
Minnesota	0	7	0	7	14

- Date: October 18
- Location: Minneapolis
- Game attendance: 56,297

Scoring summary
1		MICH	Butch Woolfolk 27-yard run (Ali Haji-Sheikh)	MICH 7-0
2		MINN	Marion Barber 2-yard run (Galley kick)	TIE 7-7
2		MICH	Haji-Sheikh 45-yard field goal	MICH 10-7
2	3:27	MICH	Woolfolk 10-yard run (Haji-Sheikh kick)	MICH 17-7
2	0:25	MICH	Haji-Sheikh 29-yard field goal	MICH 20-7
2	0:02	MICH	Haji-Sheikh 19-yard field goal	MICH 23-7
3		MICH	Anthony Carter 23-yard pass from John Wangler (Haji-Sheikh kick)	MICH 30-7
4		MINN	Barber 1-yard run (Gallery kick)	MICH 30-14
4		MICH	Carter 5-yard pass from Wangler (Haji-Sheikh kick)	MICH 37-14

On October 18, Michigan defeated Minnesota, 37–14, on homecoming day at Memorial Stadium in Minneapolis. The crowd of 56,297 was the largest at Memorial Stadium since 1973. Minnesota crowded the line of scrimmage to stop Michigan's run game, opening up the passing game. Quarterback John Wangler completed 16 of 22 passes for 227 yards.

In the first quarter, Michigan drove 80 yards on 11 plays, ending with a 27-yard touchdown run by Butch Woolfolk. The Golden Gophers tied the game early in the second quarter on a one-yard run by Marion Barber. Ali Haji-Sheikh put Michigan back in the lead with a 45-yard field goal.

With less than five minutes remaining in the first half, Wangler threw an interception at Minnesota's 15-yard line. Two plays later, Barber fumbled, and Cedric Coles recovered the ball for Michigan at the five-yard line. Woolfolk followed with his second touchdown on a one-yard run.

After a defensive hold, Haji-Sheikh kicked his second field goal with 25 seconds remaining in the half. Minnesota fumbled again on its next play from scrimmage, and Coles recovered at the eight-yard line. Haji-Sheikh kicked his third field goal of the quarter. Michigan scored 13 points in the last three-and-a-half minutes of the half, including two field goals in the last 30 seconds, to take a 23–7 lead at halftime. After the game, Minnesota coach Joe Salem said: "It was unbelievable. Everything in the world that you could imagine going wrong happened to us in those last few minutes of the second quarter. The roof caved in."

In the second half, Wangler threw two touchdown passes to Anthony Carter—a 27-yarder in the third quarter and a five-yarder in the fourth quarter. Carter, who faced man-to man-coverage for much of the game, caught nine passes for 142 yards in the game. After the game, coach Schembechler boasted that "Anthony Carter is the best receiver I've ever had. He's dynamite." Carter added, "my eyes kind of light up when I see man-to-man coverage."

Minnesota scored a fourth-quarter touchdown after Rich Hewlett turned the ball over on a fumble at Michigan's 20-yard line. Barber scored on a one-yard run.

=== Illinois ===
Week 7: Illinois at Michigan

Team	1	2	3	4	Total
Illinois	7	7	0	0	14
• Michigan	14	17	7	7	45

- Date: October 25
- Location: Ann Arbor, MI
- Game attendance: 105,109
- TV announcers (ABC): Al Michaels, Ara Parseghian

Scoring summary
1	MICH	Butch Woolfolk 1-yard run (Ali Haji-Sheikh kick)	MICH 7-0
1	MICH	Anthony Carter 25-yard pass from John Wangler (Haji-Sheikh kick)	MICH 14-0
1	ILL	Mike Sherrod 5-yard pass from Dave Wilson (Bass kick)	MICH 14-7
2	MICH	Haji-Sheikh 27-yard field goal	MICH 17-7
2	MICH	Jerald Ingram 1-yard run (Haji-Sheikh kick)	MICH 24-7
2	ILL	Wayne Strader 2-yard run (Bass kick)	MICH 24-14
2	MICH	Lawrence Ricks 2-yard run (Haji-Sheikh kick)	MICH 31-14
3	MICH	Stan Edwards 4-yard run (Haji-Sheikh kick)	MICH 38-14
4	MICH	Ingram 4-yard run (Haji-Sheikh kick)	MICH 45-14

Michigan defeated Illinois, 45–14, before a homecoming crowd of 105,109 in Ann Arbor. Michigan assistant coaches Gary Moeller and Lloyd Carr had been fired by Illinois after the 1979 season and were rehired by Michigan. Rumors spread before the game that coach Schembechler wanted to "make Illinois pay" for the firings. Michigan back Stan Edwards and Lawrence Ricks rushed for 152 and 97 yards, respectively. Anthony Carter caught five passes for 121 yards and a first-half touchdown. After the game, the Michigan players presented game balls to assistant coaches Moeller and Carr.

=== Indiana ===
Week 8: Michigan at Indiana

Team	1	2	3	4	Total
• Michigan	21	0	7	7	35
Indiana	0	0	0	0	0

- Date: November 1
- Location: Bloomington, IN
- Game attendance: 52,071
- TV announcers (ON TV): Larry Adderly, Jim Brandstatter

Scoring summary
1	MICH	Lawrence Ricks 29-yard run (Ali Haji-Sheikh kick)	MICH 7-0
1	MICH	Ricks 2-yard run (Haji-Sheikh kick)	MICH 14-0
1	MICH	Anthony Carter 34-yard pass from John Wangler (Haji-Sheikh kick)	MICH 21-0
3	MICH	Stan Edwards 16-yard run (Haji-Sheikh kick)	MICH 28-0
4	MICH	Woolfolk 64-yard run (Haji-Sheikh kick)	MICH 35-0

The Michigan defense scored its first of three straight shutouts in week eight, as Michigan defeated Indiana, 35–0. Michigan running backs Butch Woolfolk and Lawrence Ricks ran for 152 and 123 yards respectively. The game's most unusual moment came when Ricks scored two touchdowns in a span of only 28 seconds in the first quarter. Ricks ran 29 yards for a touchdown, and on the ensuing kickoff, Indiana fumbled on its own 22 yard-line. Ricks ran the ball twice, scoring on the second carry after the fumble recovery. Anthony Carter caught a 34-yard touchdown pass from Wangler, and Woolfolk added a 64-yard touchdown run in the fourth quarter.

=== Wisconsin ===
Week 9: Michigan at Wisconsin

Team	1	2	3	4	Total
• Michigan	0	10	7	7	24
Wisconsin	0	0	0	0	0

- Date: November 8
- Location: Madison, WI
- Game attendance: 69,560

Scoring summary
2	2:33	MICH	Ali Haji-Sheikh 23-yard field goal	MICH 3-0
2	0:13	MICH	Anthony Carter 4-yard pass from John Wangler (Haji-Sheikh kick)	MICH 10-0
3	4:05	MICH	Butch Woolfolk 1-yard run (Haji-Sheikh kick)	MICH 17-0
4	3:29	MICH	Stan Edwards 1-yard run (Haji-Sheikh kick)	MICH 24-0

On November 8, Michigan defeated Wisconsin, 24–0, before a crowd of 69,560 at a cold and windy Camp Randall Stadium in Madison, Wisconsin.

Michigan's offense struggled early, failing to make a first down in its first six possessions. Wisconsin's Tim Stracka then fumbled a punt, which was recovered by Michigan's Rich Strenger at the Badgers' 24-yard line. Ali Haji-Sheikh kicked a 23-yard field goal with 2:33 remaining in the half. After the Michigan defense held, Dave Greenwood punted for only 16 yards, and Michigan got the ball back at the Wisconsin 42-yard line. Wangler led the Wolverines quickly down the field on a 24-yard pass to Alan Mitchell, a nine-yard pass to Stan Edwards, and a Wisconsin penalty. With 13 seconds remaining in the half, Wangler threw a four-yard touchdown pass to Anthony Carter, the only catch of the day for Michigan's top receiver.

In the third quarter, Michigan drove to Wisconsin's four-yard line. On fourth-and-one, crowd noise prevented the Wolverines from hearing Wangler's signals, and Wangler repeatedly backed away from the line of scrimmage. After two official crowd warnings, the noise continued, and the Badgers were stripped of a timeout, then another timeout, then a third timeout, and were finally charged with two delay of game penalties that gave Michigan a first down and ultimately advanced the ball to the one-yard line. Wangler then quickly handed off to Woolfolk who ran for the touchdown. Wisconsin linebacker Dave Levenick expressed frustration with the fans: "When we tried to quiet them down, they just got louder. You couldn't hear anything."

Stan Edwards scored a final touchdown on a one-yard run in the fourth quarter. The drive came at the end of an 80-yard, 19-play Wolverine drive. Michigan's defense held Wisconsin's quarterback, Jess Cole, to four completions on 11 passes for 43 yards.

=== Purdue ===
Week 10: Purdue at Michigan

Team	1	2	3	4	Total
Purdue	0	0	0	0	0
• Michigan	13	0	0	13	26

- Date: November 15
- Location: Ann Arbor, MI
- Game start: 12:25 p.m.
- Game attendance: 105,831
- Game weather: 40*
- TV announcers (ABC): Al Michaels, Ara Parseghian

Scoring summary
1	6:13	MICH	Stan Edwards 3-yard run (Ali Haji-Sheikh kick)	MICH 7–0
1	3:35	MICH	Anthony Carter 22-yard pass from John Wangler (kick blocked)	MICH 13–0
4	8:21	MICH	Butch Woolfolk 2-yard run (pass failed)	MICH 19–0
4	2:37	MICH	Anthony Carter 20-yard pass from John Wangler (Ali Haji-Sheikh kick)	MICH 26–0

On November 15, No. 11 Michigan defeated No. 16 Purdue by a 26–0 score on national television and before a crowd of 105,831 at Michigan Stadium. Prior to the game, Michigan, Purdue, and Ohio State were tied for first place in the Big Ten. Purdue, ranked fourth in the nation in total offense and second in passing offense, was led by senior quarterback Mark Herrmann who entered the game as the all-time NCAA career leader in pass yardage and completions. Michigan defensive coordinator Bill McCartney used six defensive backs to contain Herrmann, a formation Michigan had never employed before. The shutout extended Michigan's streak to 14 quarters without allowing a point.

On the game's opening possession, Purdue drove to Michigan's 21-yard line before Mel Owens sacked Herrmann for an 11-yard loss. Purdue went for it on fourth-and-sixteen, but Herrmann's pass was broken up by Marion Body.

On Michigan's opening possession, the Wolverines drove 68 yards for a touchdown. John Wangler completed passes of 19 and 23 yards to Anthony Carter, and Stan Edwards scored on a three-yard run behind a strong block of Jim Looney by Kurt Becker.

Michigan held Purdue to a three-and-out on the Boilermakers' second possession, and a short punt gave Michigan the ball at the 50-yard line. Michigan drove 50 yards in 1:18, scoring on a 22-yard touchdown pass from Wangler to Carter. After Ali Haji-Sheikh's extra point kick was blocked (Haji-Sheikh's first miss of the season after converting 34 straight), Michigan took a 13–0 with 3:35 remaining in the first quarter.

Purdue's third possession was another three-and-out as Herrmann was sacked by Mel Owens on third down. On its fourth possession, Purdue drove to Michigan's 14-yard line but Michigan defensive back Tony Jackson ripped a pass from the arms of Bart Burrell for an interception in the end zone. Purdue's fifth possession started at midfield after an Anthony Carter fumble, but Marion Body intercepted Herrmann at the 20-yard line. With two minutes remaining in the first half, Tony Jackson intercepted a third Herrmann pass at Michigan's 25-yard line.

After converting 12 first downs in the first half, Purdue failed to convert any first downs in the second half. The Wolverines held Purdue in the second half to drives of six yards, five yards, one yard, six yards, seven yards, and minus three yards. On Purdue's final possession, Andy Cannavino intercepted a fourth Herrmann pass with 1:54 remaining. Coach Schembechler was effusive in his praise of the defense: "Unbelievable. We've never shut any body down since I've been here like we did Purdue in the second half."

Michigan's offense struggled in the second and third quarters, then came back to life in the fourth quarter. After Haji-Sheikh missed a field goal early in the fourth quarter, the Wolverines drove 60 yards in eight plays for a touchdown on its next possession. The drive featured a 30-yard run by Stan Edwards, and Butch Woolfolk dove over the line from two yards out for the touchdown. Wangler's pass to Norm Betts for the two-point conversion fell incomplete. Michigan's final scoring drive went 46 yards capped by a 20-yard touchdown pass from Wangler to Carter with 2:37 remaining.

Wangler completed 12 of 20 passes for 165 yards and two touchdowns with one interception. Edwards rushed for 164 yards on 29 carries, and Carter caught eight passes for 133 yards and two touchdowns.

=== At Ohio State ===
Week 11: Michigan at Ohio State

Team	1	2	3	4	Total
• Michigan	0	3	6	0	9
Ohio State	0	3	0	0	3

- Date: November 22
- Location: Columbus, OH
- Game attendance: 88,827
- TV announcers (ABC): Al Michaels, Ara Parseghian

Scoring summary
2	12:11	OSU	Vlade Janakievski 33-yard field goal	OSU 3-0
2		MICH	Ali Haji-Sheikh 43-yard field goal	Tied 3-3
3		MICH	Anthony Carter 13-yard pass from John Wangler (kick failed)	MICH 9-3

In the final game of the regular season, Michigan faced Ohio State in front of a record crowd of 88,827 in Columbus, Ohio. Ohio State, which started the season ranked No. 1 in the country, had lost a non-conference game to UCLA and came into the game ranked No. 5. The Buckeyes were led by senior quarterback Art Schlichter who became the third player in Big Ten history to surpass 6,000 yards in total offense (Mark Herrmann and Rick Leach were the first to accomplish the feat). Michigan's only touchdown came late in the third quarter on a pass from John Wangler to Anthony Carter. Butch Woolfolk rushed for 142 yards. Placekicker Ali-Haji-Sheikh kicked a 43-yard field goal in the first half, though he missed a 38-yarder. However, the game was close due to Michigan mistakes, including three interceptions, two missed field goals, and an extra-point kick that hit the left upright and bounced back on the field. The errors led coach Schembechler to say, "It may not be the prettiest win and its wasn't the most explosive offensive show you've ever seen, but we won it." Ohio State had a chance to win late in the fourth quarter, as Schlichter completed a 28-yard pass to the Michigan 32-yard line with less than a minute to play. On the ensuing drive, Schlichter was penalized for intentional grounding and was sacked on the next play with 13 seconds left on the clock. The Michigan defense held Schlichter to 8-of-25 passing and extended its streak of not having allowed a touchdown to 18 quarters and 274 minutes.

After the game, coach Schembechler paid tribute to his Big Ten championship team: "This was a great group in terms of never giving up. I enjoy this championship more than any of the previous ones because of the way we came back."

=== 1981 Rose Bowl ===
As the Big Ten Conference champion, Michigan advanced to the 1981 Rose Bowl game in which it defeated the Pac-10 Conference champion Washington Huskies by a score of 23–6. Coach Bo Schembechler, who had gone winless in seven prior bowl games (five Rose Bowls, an Orange Bowl, and a Gator Bowl), was the focus of much of the pre-game press coverage. Michigan center George Lilja noted before the game, "We want to win for our coach as much as for ourselves." Michigan scored on a six-yard touchdown run by Butch Woolfolk to take a 7–6 lead at halftime. Michigan drove the ball 83 yards to start the second half, scoring on a 25-yard field goal by Ali Haji-Sheikh. In the third quarter, Wangler completed a seven-yard touchdown pass to Anthony Carter, and added another touchdown in the fourth quarter on a one-yard run by Stan Edwards. After the game, Michigan players carried Schembechler off the field on their shoulders as the coach held his arms above his head in victory. In the post-game press conference, Schembechler said, "I stood here five times before a loser. Now I'm smoking a cigar and smiling. ... Right now, I'm on top of the world. I feel great about everything."

Michigan finished the season ranked No. 4 in both the AP and UPI polls.

=== Award season ===
Two Michigan players were selected as first or second-team players on the 1980 All-America college football team:

- Wide receiver Anthony Carter received first-team honors from the Associated Press and The Sporting News, and second-team honors from the Newspaper Enterprise Association (NEA).
- Center George Lilja received first-team honors from the Walter Camp Football Foundation, and second-team honors from the United Press International and NEA, and third-team honors from the Associated Press.
- Defensive tackle Mike Trgovac received second-team honors from the Associated Press.
- Linebacker Andy Cannavino received second-team honors from the Associated Press.

Nine Michigan players, including all five interior offensive linemen, were selected by the Associated Press and/or United Press International (coaches) as first-team players on the 1980 All-Big Ten Conference football team: Anthony Carter at wide receiver/split end (AP-1, UPI-1), George Lilja at center (AP-1, UPI-1), Mike Trgovac at defensive line (AP-1, UPI-1), Andy Cannavino at linebacker (AP-1, UPI-1), Ed Muransky at offensive tackle (AP-1, UPI-1), Bubba Paris at offensive tackle (AP-1, UPI-1), Mel Owens at defensive line (AP-2, UPI-1), Kurt Becker at offensive guard (AP-1, UPI-2), and John Powers at offensive guard (AP-2, UPI-1). Three others received second-team honors: Stan Edwards at running back (AP-2, UPI-2), Keith Bostic at defensive back (UPI-2), and Tony Jackson at defensive back (UPI-2).

Team awards were presented as follows:

- Most Valuable Player: Anthony Carter
- Meyer Morton Award: George Lilja
- John Maulbetsch Award: Keith Bostic

== Personnel ==
=== Full roster ===
1980 Michigan Wolverines football team roster
Players
Coaches
Offense

Pos.	#	Name	Class
G	65	Kurt Becker	Sr
TE	82	Norm Betts	Jr
QB	8	Jim Breaugh	Sr
WR	25	Fred Brockington	Jr
WR	1	Anthony Carter	So
TE	83	Milt Carthens	So
TE	85	Chuck Christian	Sr
G	64	Jerry Diorio	Fr
G	60	Tom Dixon	Fr
TE	88	Craig Dunaway	So
RB	32	Stanley Edwards	Sr
C	51	Jeff Felten	Jr
WR	39	Kenneth Gear	So
QB	2	Rich Hewlett	So
FB	35	Jerald Ingram	So
C	59	George Lilja	Sr
WR	30	Alan Mitchell	Sr
OT	72	Ed Muransky	Jr
OT	78	Tony Osbun	Sr
OT	76	Bubba Paris	Jr
G	67	John Powers	Sr
TB	46	Lawrence Ricks	So
TB	23	Kerry Smith	Fr
QB	16	Steve Smith	Fr
OT	68	Rich Strenger	Jr
C		Larry Sweeney	Fr
G	66	Tom Wandersleben	Jr
QB	5	John Wangler	Sr
TB	24	Butch Woolfolk	Jr

Defense

Pos.	#	Name	Class
DB	12	Brad Bates	Sr
DB	3	Marion Body	Jr
LB	40	Mike Boren	Fr
FS	13	Keith Bostic	So
DB	15	Jerry Burgei	So
LB	41	Andy Cannavino	Sr
CB	9	Brian Carpenter	Jr
MG	63	Winfred Carraway	So
DB	10	Jeff Cohen	So
DT	92	Cedric Coles	Jr
DB	21	Evan Cooper	Fr
DB	29	Gerald Diggs	Sr
LB	50	Paul Girgash	So
DB	48	Thomas Hassel	Fr
LB	94	Jim Herrmann	So
DL	76	Stefan Humphries	Fr
FS	37	Tony Jackson	Jr
LB	81	Oliver Johnson	Sr
MG	97	Tony Kelsie	Jr
DT	57	Kelly Keough	Sr
LB	93	Mike Lemirande	Jr
DB	44	John Lott	So
MG	52	Fred Motley	Sr
DT	96	Dave Nicolau	Sr
LB	53	Mel Owens	Sr
SS	43	Jeff Reeves	Jr
LB	89	Carlton Rose	Fr
MG	79	Jeff Shaw	Fr
LB	99	Robert Tompson	Jr
MG	77	Mike Trgovac	Sr

Special teams

Pos.	#	Name	Class
P	28	Don Bracken	Fr
K	6	Ali Haji-Sheikh	So

Head coach

- Bo Schembechler

Coordinators/assistant coaches

Legend

- (C) Team captain
- (S) Suspended
- (I) Ineligible
- Injured
- Redshirt

Roster

=== Offensive letter winners ===
- Kurt Becker, offensive guard, senior, Aurora, Illinois - started all 12 games at right offensive guard
- Norm Betts, tight end, junior, Midland, Michigan - started 11 games at tight end
- Jim Breaugh, quarterback, senior, West Bloomfield, Michigan
- Fred Brockington, wide receiver, junior, Detroit, Michigan
- Anthony Carter, wide receiver, sophomore, Riviera Beach, Florida - started all 12 games at wide receiver
- Chuck Christian, tight end, senior, Detroit, Michigan - started 1 game at tight end
- Jerry Diorio, offensive guard, freshman, Youngstown, Ohio
- Tom Dixon, offensive guard, freshman, Fort Wayne, Indiana - started 1 game at left offensive guard
- Craig Dunaway, tight end, sophomore, Pittsburgh, Pennsylvania
- Stanley Edwards, tailback, senior, Detroit, Michigan - started all 12 games at fullback
- Jeff Felten, center, junior, Centerville, Ohio
- Kenneth A. Gear, wide receiver, sophomore, Madison, Wisconsin- backed up both position at wide receiver
- Rich Hewlett, quarterback, sophomore, Plymouth, Michigan - started 1 game at quarterback
- Jerald Ingram, fullback, sophomore, Beaver, Pennsylvania
- George Lilja, center, senior, Palos Park, Illinois - started all 12 games at center
- Alan Mitchell, wide receiver, senior, Detroit, Michigan - started all 12 games at split end
- Ed Muransky, offensive tackle, junior, Youngstown, Ohio - started all 12 games at right offensive tackle
- Tony Osbun, offensive tackle, senior, Kenton, Ohio
- Bubba Paris, offensive tackle, junior, Louisville, Kentucky - started all 12 games at left offensive tackle
- John J. Powers, offensive guard, senior, Oak Park, Illinois - started 11 games at left offensive guard
- Lawrence Ricks, tailback, sophomore, Barberton, Ohio - started 6 games at tailback
- Kerry Smith, tailback, freshman, Grand Rapids, Michigan
- Steve Smith, quarterback, freshman, Grand Blanc, Michigan
- Rich Strenger, offensive tackle, junior, Grafton, Wisconsin
- Larry Sweeney, center, freshman, Alma, Michigan
- Tom Wandersleben, offensive guard, junior, Euclid, Ohio
- John Wangler, quarterback, senior, Royal Oak, Michigan - started 10 games at quarterback
- Butch Woolfolk, tailback, junior, Westfield, New Jersey - started 6 games at tailback

=== Defensive letter winners ===
- Brad Bates, defensive back, senior, Port Huron, Michigan
- Marion Body, defensive back, junior, Detroit, Michigan - started all 12 games (11 at strong-side cornerback, 1 at weak-side cornerback)
- Mike Boren, linebacker, freshman, Columbus, Ohio
- Keith Bostic, defensive back, sophomore, Ann Arbor, Michigan - started 8 games at strong safety, 2 games at free safety
- Jerry Burgei, defensive back, sophomore, Ottawa, Ohio
- Andy Cannavino, inside linebacker, senior, Cleveland, Ohio - started 11 games at inside linebacker
- Brian Carpenter, defensive back, junior, Flint, Michigan - started 11 games at weak-side cornerback
- Winfred Carraway, middle guard, sophomore, Detroit, Michigan - started 5 games at defensive tackle, 1 game at middle guard
- Milt Carthens, tight end, sophomore, Pontiac, Michigan
- Jeff Cohen, defensive back, sophomore, Farmington Hills, Michigan - started 2 games at strong safety
- Cedric Coles, defensive tackle, junior, Detroit, Michigan - started 4 games at defensive tackle
- Evan Cooper, defensive back, freshman, Miami, Florida
- Gerald Diggs, defensive back, senior, Chicago, Illinois - started 1 game at strong-side cornerback
- Paul Girgash, linebacker, sophomore, Lakewood, Ohio - started all 12 games at inside linebacker
- Thomas J. Hassel, defensive back, freshman, Cincinnati, Ohio
- Jim Herrmann, inside linebacker, sophomore, Dearborn Heights, Michigan - started 1 game at inside linebacker
- Stefan Humphries, defensive line, freshman, Broward, Florida
- Tony Jackson, defensive back, junior, Cleveland, Ohio - started 10 games at free safety
- Oliver Johnson, offensive linebacker, senior, Detroit, Michigan
- Tony Kelsie, middle guard, junior, Dover, Delaware - started 3 games at middle guard
- Kelly Keough, defensive tackle, senior, Merrillville, Indiana
- Mike Lemirande, outside linebacker, junior, Grafton, Wisconsin - started 1 game at outside linebacker
- John Lott, defensive back, sophomore, Masury, Ohio
- Fred Motley, middle guard, senior, Dayton, Ohio
- Dave Nicolau, defensive tackle, senior, Elk Grove Village, Illinois - started 3 games at defensive tackle
- Mel Owens, outside linebacker, senior, DeKalb, Illinois - started 11 games at outside linebacker
- Jeff Reeves, defensive back, junior, Columbus, Ohio - started 2 games at strong safety
- Carlton Rose, linebacker, freshman, Ft. Lauderdale, Florida
- Jeff R. Shaw, middle guard, freshman, Matawan, New Jersey - started 8 games at middle guard, 1 game at defensive tackle
- Robert Thompson, outside linebacker, junior, Blue Island, Illinois - started all 12 games at outside linebacker
- Mike Trgovac, middle guard, senior, Austintown, Ohio - started 11 games at defensive tackle

=== Kickers ===
- Don Bracken, punter, freshman, Thermopolis, Wyoming
- Ali Haji-Sheikh, place-kicker, sophomore, Arlington, Texas

=== Professional football ===
Twenty-five (25) members of the 1980 Michigan football team went on to play professional football. They are: Kurt Becker (Chicago Bears, 1982–88, 1990, Los Angeles Rams, 1989), Marion Body (Michigan Panthers, 1983), Keith Bostic (Houston Oilers, 1983–88, Cleveland Browns, 1990), Don Bracken (Green Bay Packers, 1985–90, Los Angeles Rams, 1992–93), Andy Cannavino (Michigan Panthers, 1983, Chicago Blitz, 1984), Brian Carpenter (New York Giants, 1982, Washington Redskins, 1983–84, Buffalo Bills, 1984), Anthony Carter (Michigan Panthers, 1983–84, Oakland Invaders, 1985, Minnesota Vikings, 1985–93, Detroit Lions, 1994–95), Milt Carthens (Indianapolis Colts, 1987), Evan Cooper (Philadelphia Eagles, 1984–87, Atlanta Falcons, 1988–89), Jerry Diorio (Detroit Lions, 1987), Tom Dixon (Michigan Panthers, 1984), Craig Dunaway (Pittsburgh Steelers, 1983), Stanley Edwards (Houston Oilers, 1982–86, Detroit Lions, 1987), Paul Girgash (Michigan Panthers, 1984), Ali Haji-Sheikh (New York Giants, 1983–85, Atlanta Falcons, 1986, Washington Redskins, 1987), Stefan Humphries (Chicago Bears, 1984–86, Denver Broncos, 1987–88), George Lilja (Los Angeles Rams, 1982, New York Jets, 1983–84, Cleveland Browns, 1984–86, Dallas Cowboys, 1987), Ed Muransky (Los Angeles Raiders, 1982–84, Orlando Renegades, 1985), Mel Owens (Los Angeles Rams, 1981–89), Bubba Paris (San Francisco 49ers, 1983–90, Indianapolis Colts, 1991, Detroit Lions 1991), Lawrence Ricks (Kansas City Chiefs, 1983–84), Carlton Rose (Washington Redskins, 1987), Rich Strenger (Detroit Lions, 1983–87), Robert Thompson (Tampa Bay Buccaneers, 1983–84, Detroit Lions, 1987), and Butch Woolfolk (New York Giants, 1982–84, Houston Oilers, 1985–86, Detroit Lions, 1987–88).

=== Coaching staff ===
- Head coach - Bo Schembechler
- Assistant coaches

- Bill McCartney - defensive coordinator
- Lloyd Carr - defensive backfield coach
- Milan Vooletich - linebackers coach
- Jerry Meter - defensive line coach
- Tim Davis - defensive line coach
- Ron Vanderlinden - assistant defensive line coach
- Gary Moeller - quarterbacks coach
- Jerry Hanlon - offensive line coach
- Paul Schudel - offensive line coach
- Les Miles - offensive line coach
- Tirrel Burton - offensive backfield coach
- Bob Thornbladh - wide receivers coach

Michigan's assistant coaches in 1980 included six individuals who went on to success as head coaches—Miles (who won the 2007 national championship with LSU), Carr (who won the 1997 national championship with Michigan), McCartney (who led Colorado to a national title in 1990), Vanderlinden (head coach at Maryland for four years), Moeller (who led Michigan to three Big Ten championships and a No. 5 ranking in 1992), and Schudel (head coach at Ball State from 1985 to 1994).

== Statistics ==
=== Offensive statistics ===
==== Rushing ====
Player	Att	Net Yards	Yds/Att	TD	Long
Butch Woolfolk	196	1042	5.3	8	64
Stanley Edwards	192	901	4.7	8	42
Lawrence Ricks	167	850	5.1	6	29
Jerald Ingram	33	145	4.4	2	26
Rich Hewlett	21	73	3.5	0	17
Anthony Carter	10	68	6.8	0	21
Kerry Smith	8	46	5.8	0	16
Tom Hassel	6	17	2.8	0	9
Steve Smith	9	8	0.9	0	9

==== Passing ====
Player	Att	Comp	Int	Comp %	Yds	Yds/Comp	TD	Long
John Wangler	212	117	9	55.2	1522	13.0	16	55
Rich Hewlett	17	7	0	41.2	118	16.9	2	25
Steve Smith	6	3	0	50.0	44	14.7	0	24

==== Receiving ====
Player	Recp	Yds	Yds/Recp	TD	Long
Anthony Carter	51	818	16.0	14	44
Alan Mitchell	13	215	16.5	0	26
Norm Betts	17	161	9.5	1	17
Craig Dunaway	9	135	15.0	2	55
Stanley Edwards	9	93	10.3	0	17
Butch Woolfolk	10	68	6.8	0	12
Kenney Gear	3	60	20.0	0	25
Lawrence Ricks	8	56	7.0	1	13
Fred Brockington	2	31	15.5	0	16
Jerald Ingram	3	23	7.7	0	13
Chuck Christian	1	10	10.0	0	10
Milt Carthens	1	4	4.0	0	4

=== Defensive statistics ===
==== Tackles, assists and interceptions ====
Player	Tackles	Assists	Total	Interceptions
Andy Cannavino	81	47	128	4
Mel Owens	52	37	89	1
Paul Girgash	53	28	81	0
Robert Thompson	51	28	79	1
Mike Trgovac	36	27	63	0
Marion Body	41	16	57	5
Keith Bostic	38	14	52	2
Tony Jackson	28	14	42	2
Winfred Carraway	23	12	35	0
Jeff Reeves	26	6	32	0
Brian Carpenter	25	7	32	5
Cedric Coles	18	13	31	0
Jim Herrmann	19	11	30	0

=== Special teams statistics ===
==== Kickoff returns ====
Player	Returns	Yds	Yds/Rtrn	TD	Long
Anthony Carter	15	427	28.5	0	67
Tom Hassel	1	12	12.0	0	12
Kenney Gear	1	12	12.0	0	12
Stanley Edwards	1	12	12.0	0	12
Jerald Ingram	1	12	12.0	0	12
Brian Carpenter	1	9	9.0	0	9

==== Punt returns ====
Player	Returns	Yds	Yds/Rtrn	TD	Long
Anthony Carter	24	165	6.9	0	21
Brian Carpenter	3	14	4.7	0	9
Tony Jackson	1	13	13.0	0	13

== See also ==
- 1980 in Michigan
