= John Wangler =

American football quarterback

No. 5 – Michigan Wolverines
- Position: Quarterback
- Roster status: Retired

Personal information
- Born: June 10 1958; Detroit, Michigan
- Listed height: 6 ft 3 in (1.91 m)
- Listed weight: 192 lb (87 kg)

Career information
- High school: Shrine Catholic (Royal Oak, Michigan)
- College: Michigan

Career history
- 1977–1980: Michigan

Awards and highlights
- First-team Academic All-Big Ten Quarterback, 1980; Second-team Academic All-American Quarterback, 1980

John "Johnny" Wangler (born c. 1958) is an American former football quarterback. He played for the University of Michigan from 1977 to 1980. During the 1979 and 1980 seasons, Wangler and Anthony Carter formed one of the most successful passing combinations in Michigan Wolverines football history. Wangler's game-ending touchdown pass to Carter in the 1979 Indiana game led Michigan's famed radio announcer, Bob Ufer, to exclaim, "Johnny Wangler to Anthony Carter will be heard until another 100 years of Michigan football is played!" After suffering what appeared to be a career-ending knee injury in the 1979 Gator Bowl, Wangler came back and led the 1980 Michigan Wolverines football team to a Big Ten Conference championship and its first victory in the Rose Bowl Game since the 1964 season. Upon completing his career at Michigan, Wangler ranked second all-time among Michigan quarterbacks in most career passing statistics, including passing yardage, touchdown passes, yards per completion and completion percentage.

== Shrine High School ==
Wangler attended Shrine Catholic High School in Royal Oak, Michigan, where he starred in both football and basketball. Wangler later recalled, "There is a great tradition and pride in putting on the Shrine basketball jersey. You represent the generations of players, teams and coaches every time you step on that court." In 2009, Wangler was one of the initial inductees into the Shrine High School Hall of Fame.

== University of Michigan ==
=== Early years at Michigan ===
Wangler enrolled at the University of Michigan in 1976. As a true freshman, he was considered a contender to be the backup to Michigan's starting quarterback, Rick Leach. However, he appeared only briefly in three games in 1976, completing one of two passes for eight yards.

In 1977, Wangler made two brief appearances as a substitute for Leach. In a 63–20 victory over Northwestern, Wangler threw only one pass, and it was good for 34 yards and a touchdown to Alan Mitchell.

Wangler missed the 1978 season due to a pinched nerve in his neck or shoulder.

=== 1979 season ===
Rick Leach was Michigan's starting quarterback in 47 of 48 games from 1975 to 1978. With his graduation, considerable media attention was focused on the competition to replace him in 1979. The leading contenders were Wangler and B.J. Dickey. Dickey won the starting assignment, though Wangler was given substantial playing time as a backup and was the starting quarterback in four games. During the 1979 season, Wangler completed 78 of 130 passes for 1,431 yards. His 60% completion percentage set a new single-season record for Michigan quarterbacks with at least 25 pass attempts.

Dickey started the season opener against Northwestern, but Wangler played in the second half. Wangler completed five of six passes for 67 yards. In the third quarter, Wangler connected with Anthony Carter for a 12-yard touchdown pass—the first of many touchdown passes from Wangler to Carter during the 1979 and 1980 seasons.

Wangler also played as a substitute for Dickey in a 12–10 loss to Notre Dame. Wangler replaced Dickey in the final two minutes of the game. He completed three passes for 29 yards and took the Wolverines from their own 42-yard line to the Notre Dame 20-yard line before Michigan running back, Stanley Edwards, was thrown for a five-yard loss. Michigan's attempt at a game-winning 42-yard field goal was blocked with one second left in the game.

After nearly leading a comeback against Notre Dame, Wangler was given the starting assignment against Kansas. Wangler led the Wolverines to a 28-7 win as he completed 12 of 18 passes for 195 yards, including an eight-yard touchdown pass to Doug Marsh.

The following week, Wangler played the entire game at quarterback in a 14–10 come-from-behind win against California. He completed 9 of 21 passes for 210 yards, including a 58-yard pass to Doug Marsh. In its game coverage, the Associated Press wrote that "John Wangler brought alive a sluggish Michigan offense."

Against Minnesota in the sixth game, Wangler came into the game as a substitute for Dickey and completed three of five passes for 39 yards, including a one-yard touchdown pass to Lawrence Reid.

In Michigan's eighth game against an unranked Indiana team, Wangler had his most replayed moment in a Michigan uniform. Dickey started the game, and Wangler entered the game as a substitute. The game was tied at 21–21 in the fourth quarter. There was no overtime in college football, and Michigan fans would have regarded a tie as the equivalent of a defeat. With six seconds left on the clock, Michigan had the ball on the Indiana 45-yard line. Wangler dropped back to pass from his own 45-yard line, and his pass hit Anthony Carter at the 23-yard line. Carter ran into the end zone as time ran out to give the Wolverines a 27–21 victory. The play was made famous by Bob Ufer's colorful and emotional radio narration as the play unfolded. A portion of Ufer's oft-replayed call follows:

"Under center is Wangler at the 45, he goes back. He's looking for a receiver. He throws downfield to Carter. Carter has it. [unintellibible screaming] Carter scores. . . . I have never seen anything like this in all my 40 years of covering Michigan football. . . . I hope you can hear me – because I've never been so happy in all my cotton-picking 59 years! . . . Johnny Wangler to Anthony Carter will be heard until another 100 years of Michigan football is played! . . . Meeeshigan wins, 27 to 21. They aren't even going to try the extra point. Who cares? Who gives a damn?"

Wangler completed 10 of 14 passes for 163 yards in the Indiana game. The game-ending pass from Wangler to Carter has been called "the greatest single play in the 100-year history of Michigan football."

The following week, Wangler got the start for only the second time in his career. He led Michigan to an impressive 54–0 win over Wisconsin. Butch Woolfolk rushed for 190 yards and three touchdowns, and Wangler completed 10 of 13 passes for 219 yards, including a 71-yard touchdown pass to Doug Marsh. The Gannett News Service wrote: "Michigan, riding the arm of quarterback John Wangler and the fancy footwork of tailback Butch Woolfolk, rolled all over hapless Wisconsin here Saturday afternoon, 54–0."

Wangler got his third start in a 24–21 loss to Purdue. Wangler was intercepted four times in the game, twice in the first quarter. After allowing Purdue to take a 14–0 lead, Wangler nearly led the Wolverines to a come-from-behind victory. Late in the third quarter, Wangler led a 69-yard drive that was capped by a touchdown pass to Doug Marsh. Purdue responded with a field goal, and on Michigan's first drive in the fourth quarter, Wangler gave up his fourth interception. Purdue took a 24–6 lead with 10:27 to play. Roosevelt Smith scored for Michigan with 8:21 left, and Michigan recovered a Purdue fumble with 7:09 left. Wangler's passing led the Wolverines to the Purdue three-yard line, and Woolfolk scored with 5:34 left. After Andy Cannavino intercepted a Mark Herrmann pass, Wangler led Michigan to the Purdue two-yard line, but he was sacked on fourth down, allowing Purdue to run out the clock. Wangler completed 14 of 28 passes in the game for 159 yards.

In the final game of the regular season, Michigan lost to Ohio State, 18–15. Freshman Rich Hewlett got the start at quarterback, as Schembechler tried to surprise Ohio State with an option offense. The strategy did not work, and Wangler was brought into the game with 3:48 left in the first half. After entering the game, Wangler led the Wolverines 80 yards in seven plays for their first score. The big play of the drive was a 66-yard pass from Wangler to Carter who took the ball to the Ohio State 19-yard line. Wangler completed four of nine passes for 133 yards and added 25 rushing yards.

=== 1979 Gator Bowl and knee injury ===
Michigan ended the regular season with an 8–3 record and accepted an invitation to play against North Carolina in the Gator Bowl. Wangler started for Michigan in the Gator Bowl and got the Wolverines off to a quick start. He opened the game with a 47-yard pass completion to Carter. In the first quarter-and-a-half of play, Wangler completed 6-of-8 passes for 203 yards. Michigan's first score came on a field goal in the first minute of the second quarter. With 9:47 left in the half, Wangler threw a 53-yard touchdown pass to Carter who was open at the North Carolina 20-yard line and ran untouched into the end zone.

On the next drive, with Michigan leading, 9–0, Wangler was sacked by North Carolina's Lawrence Taylor midway through the second quarter. Following the sack, Wangler reportedly screamed in agony. The hit resulted in torn ligaments in Wangler's knee, and he was unable to return to the game. North Carolina outscored Michigan, 17–6, after Wangler left the game. Despite the loss, Wangler was named co-MVP of the game. After the game, Schembechler said, "Wangler hit some big plays. Losing him was one of those things. A good football team has to overcome that."

Dr. Gerald O'Connor, Michigan's team physician, operated on Wangler's knee. He reported that two cross ligaments in Wangler's knee were completely ruptured, and there was also torn cartilage. O'Connor later recalled, "Usually, that type of injury is not compatible to coming back to the level that Wangler did ..." Schembechler added, "I never thought he'd play again. It was a courageous and remarkable comeback -- and a great job of surgery. After he got the cast off, he just about never left the weight room or the training room."

Schembechler did not include Wangler in his plans for the 1980 season, but Wangler spent the summer in Ann Arbor working with offensive guard Kurt Becker to rehabilitate the knee. Becker recalled that Wangler's recuperation was difficult: "There was so much pain involved that there were tears in his eyes." Wangler described his rehabilitation as follows:

"Maybe I was naive, but I never had a doubt I'd play again. I wasn't ready to end my career. I'd do anything to play. The cast came off March 1st and by August 1st I knew I'd be able to play. I worked out four to five hours every day with weights, running, bicycling and swimming."

In his book, The Blind Side, Michael Lewis cited Taylor's sack of Wangler as an example of the vulnerability of quarterbacks. Taylor later ended Joe Theisman's career as well. Lewis wrote, "Before Taylor hit him, Wangler had been a legitimate NFL prospect." Wangler told Lewis, "I was invited to try out for the Lions and Cowboys, but everyone was kind of afraid of the severity of my injury."

=== 1980 season ===
As a fifth-year senior, Wangler came back from knee surgery to start 10 of 12 games for the 1980 Michigan Wolverines football team that finished the season 10–2 (9–1 with Wangler as a starter) and ranked No. 4 in both the AP and UPI polls. During the 1980 season, Wangler completed 117 of 212 passes for 1,522 yards and 16 touchdown passes. He was intercepted nine times. His 16 touchdown passes in 1980 was the second highest total in school history at the time, trailing Rick Leach's total of 17 in 1978. His total of 1,522 passing yards was the third highest in school history, trailing Dick Vidmer's 1,609 yards in 1966 and Dennis Brown's 1,562 yards in 1968.

In part because of uncertainties over Wangler's knee, Michigan entered the 1980 season picked to finish third in the Big Ten behind Ohio State (led by Art Schlichter) and Purdue (led by Mark Herrmann).

Michigan played Northwestern in the season opener. Sophomore Rich Hewlett got the start at quarterback in a game played in a heavy rain during the first half. Early in the fourth quarter, Northwestern scored a touchdown to tie the game, 10–10. The Michigan fans began chants of "We Want Wangler." Wangler entered the game briefly and completed three of four passes for 36 yards, but Schembechler stuck with Hewlett in the fourth quarter. Hewlett responded with a 23-yard touchdown pass to Anthony Carter to give Michigan a 17–10 win. After the game, Hewlett said he tried not to pay attention to the chants calling for Wangler, and Schembechler said, "I don't care who they call for. You know that won't dictate what I do."

In the second week of the season, Michigan played Notre Dame in South Bend. Hewlett again started the game for Michigan. After a scoreless first quarter, Notre Dame took a 14–0 lead in the second quarter. Wangler replaced Hewlett in the second quarter, throwing two touchdown passes (to Lawrence Ricks and Norm Betts) in the span of 1:19 to tie the game, 14–14, at halftime. In the third quarter, Notre Dame took the lead on a 49-yard interception return of a Wangler pass. In the fourth quarter, Michigan drove to the Notre Dame four-yard line with less than a minute to play. Wangler threw a pass to Butch Woolfolk in the endzone that was tipped and caught by Michigan tight end, Craig Dunaway, giving Michigan a 27–26 lead with 41 seconds left. Notre Dame drove to Michigan's 41-yard line and won on a 51-yard field goal as time ran out.

In the third game of the season, Michigan faced a South Carolina team led by 1980 Heisman Trophy winner George Rogers. Wangler got the start and threw two touchdown passes to Carter to give Michigan a 14–3 lead. South Carolina scored 14 points in the second half and held the Wolverines scoreless to win the game 17–14.

After starting the season 1–2, Michigan beat California 38–13. Wangler started the game and completed 8 of 14 passes for 109 yards, as Michigan kept the ball on the ground most of the day and tallied 388 rushing yards.

Michigan improved to 3–2 with a 27–23 win over Michigan State. With the game tied 13–13 in the second half, Wangler threw a touchdown pass to Carter. Wangler completed a second touchdown pass to Craig Dunaway in the fourth quarter. Wangler completed 9 of 19 passes for 122 yards.

In the sixth game of the season, Wangler led Michigan to a 37–14 road victory over Minnesota. Wangler threw for a personal-high 227 yards on 16-for-22 passing, and Carter caught nine passes for 149 yards and two touchdowns.

Michigan defeated Illinois 45–14 in week 7 on the strength of 376 rushing yards. In the first half, Wangler completed five passes to Carter for 129 yards and a touchdown. Carter and Wangler did not play in the second half.

Following the Illinois game, the Associated Press took note of Michigan's passing attack, reporting that "Michigan will take a sophisticated passing attack to Indiana on Saturday led by quarterback John Wangler who ranks No. 1 in the Big Ten in passing efficiency." The New York Times also took note: "Statistically, the conference's leading passer going into last weekend's games was John Wangler of Michigan, one of the runningest teams of the 1970's." The Wolverines defeated Indiana, 35–0. Wangler threw a 34-yard touchdown pass to Carter in the first quarter, but he also threw two interceptions. Michigan kept the ball on the ground for most of the game, gaining 373 yards rushing.

For the ninth game of the season, Michigan played on the road against Wisconsin. Michigan won, 24–0, as Carter caught a touchdown pass from Wangler to set a Michigan school record for touchdown receptions in a single season. Wangler drew praise for his handling of the crowd noise on a fourth down play at the Wisconsin four-yard line facing the student section at the north end of Camp Randall Stadium. The referee twice stopped play because Wangler's signals could not be heard. The Wisconsin fans were warned twice and responded with even more noise. The referee allowed Wangler to back off five more times, and each time the referee assessed penalties against Wisconsin. The first three times, Wisconsin had time outs taken from them, and on the next two occasions delay-of-game penalties were assessed. The penalties took the ball to the one-yard line, and on the eight attempt Wangler handed the ball to Butch Woolfolk who ran for the touchdown.

In the tenth game of the season, Michigan faced a Purdue team led by senior quarterback and Heisman Trophy candidate Mark Herrmann. Michigan won the game, 24–0. Wangler completed 12 of 20 passes for 165 yards, including touchdown passes of 22 and 20 yards to Carter.

In the final game of the regular season, Michigan defeated Ohio State, 9–3, in a game dominated by the defensive units. Michigan's only touchdown came late in the third quarter on a pass from Wangler to Carter. Wangler also threw two interceptions in the game. The errors led coach Schembechler to say, "It may not be the prettiest win and its wasn't the most explosive offensive show you've ever seen, but we won it."

Following the 1980 season, Wangler was selected as the first-team Academic All Big Ten quarterback and the second-team Academic All-American quarterback. He also won the Big Ten Medal of Honor as the Michigan student in the graduating class of 1981 who had best demonstrated proficiency in scholarship and athletics.

=== 1981 Rose Bowl ===
As the Big Ten Conference champion, Michigan advanced to the 1981 Rose Bowl game against Washington. The Associated Press ran a feature story on Wangler's coming back from adversity to lead Michigan to the Rose Bowl. The story opened as follows:

"John Wangler looks exactly like the kind of kid you'd want central casting to send over to play the role of the nice kid who overcame great hardships and went on to become a Rose Bowl quarterback. In fact, that's exactly what Wangler is."

The Chicago Tribune also published a feature story on Wangler's comeback in which Roy Damer wrote that Wangler's comeback "typifies the Michigan team." In comments to the Tribune, Schembechler added:

"John Wangler's really been an unbelievable story this year. He came back from so much to succeed. In many ways, his story is also the story of this year's team. Both had to prove themselves when others questioned them. Both are winners."

In the Rose Bowl Game, the Wolverines beat the Huskies by a score of 23–6 to give Schembechler his first victory in a bowl game. Wangler completed 12 of 20 passes in the Rose Bowl for 145 yards, including a seven-yard touchdown pass to Anthony Carter in the third quarter.

=== Career statistics and legacy ===
During his Michigan football career, Wangler completed 197 of 346 passes, for 2,994 yards, 26 touchdowns, and 16 interceptions. At the end of his career, he ranked second in Michigan history (trailing Rick Leach who was a four-year starter) in most career passing statistics, including passing yards, touchdown passes, and yards per completion. His 56.9% completion percentage was second in school history behind Bob Ptacek.

Wangler has been cited as the quarterback who began a passing tradition that led to Michigan's being considered one of the legitimate claimants for the title of "Quarterback U." Jim Harbaugh noted, "Bo started to adapt from an option-based offense to more of a balanced attack when he had John Wangler at QB and Anthony Carter at receiver in the early '80s, and I benefited from that greatly. . . . Once quarterbacks saw that they would have a chance to throw the ball, the best started going to Michigan from all over the country."

== Professional football ==
After graduating from Michigan, Wangler attended training camps with the Dallas Cowboys, Detroit Lions, and New York Jets, but never made an NFL roster. In January 1983, he was signed by the Michigan Panthers in the United States Football League (USFL). As the Panthers also drafted Anthony Carter, the signing led to interest in the Wangler-Carter pass combination being reunited. However, the Panthers cut Wangler before beginning training camp.

== Pop Culture ==
In the 1983 Academy-Award nominated film, The Big Chill, Wangler is featured briefly on television during a game against Michigan State. A pass of his is completed, but is called back due to a clipping penalty, much to the consternation of Tom Berenger's character, Sam Weber.

== Later life ==
In the mid-1980s, Wangler formed John Wangler Association, a subcontractor for the sporting goods and athletic apparel company, Nutmeg Mills.

In 1988, Wangler was engaged to Suzanne Marie Pagella, a former Ohio State cheerleader who became a television news anchor in Detroit, Lansing and other Michigan cities. Wangler and his wife divorced in 2001.

Wangler has been in the sports apparel and footwear business for 25 years. Since approximately 2000, Wangler has owned and operated Top Cat Sales, a wholesale distributor of licensed apparel and footwear for Reebok and Adidas. Wangler's company printed several hundred championship T-shirts for the Detroit Red Wings during the 2009 Stanley Cup Finals. When the Red Wings lost to the Pittsburgh Penguins, Wangler said that, in those circumstances, the losing team usually sends the shirts back to Wangler, and "we end up sending them to a third-world country."

John's son, Jack, joined the Michigan Wolverines for the 2013 season, and was in the graduating class of 2017. Jack chose Michigan over Harvard, and wore the #16 at Michigan, which was the number of former Michigan player Denard Robinson.
