= Kettering High School =

Defunct Detroit high school

Charles F. Kettering Senior High School

Location
- 6101 Van Dyke; Detroit, Michigan; United States; 42°23′05″N 83°01′15″W

Information
- Type: High school
- Motto: "Go Hard or Go Home"
- Established: 1965
- Status: Permanently closed
- Closed: 2012
- Principal: Patrisha Murrey
- Grades: 9—12 including Dual Enrollment
- Gender: Co-ed
- Enrollment: 2,100 (capacity), 800 (in 2012)
- Colors: Royal blue and white
- Athletics: Pioneers
- Affiliation: Detroit Public Schools

Kettering High School was a four-year high school within the Detroit Public Schools system. The school, located in the low-income Gratiot Town/Kettering neighborhood, was around 1,200 students under capacity at its closure in 2012.

== History ==
Kettering opened in 1965 in response to the growing Detroit Public School system (DPS) and to serve the needs of factory workers and their families in east Detroit. The school is named after Charles F. Kettering, co-founder of DELCO and head of research at General Motors for 27 years. Construction began in 1961 with removal of housing on the land where Kettering would stand, but due to financial difficulties and worker strikes, the school did not open until fall 1965. The school was compliant with desegregation efforts from the start. Additional classrooms and the gym were built between 1967 and 1969; a pool was planned but was delayed until 1975 by Milliken v. Bradley, a major move towards desegregation in DPS. The city itself was dramatically segregated and enrollment records show 89% of Kettering was Black while Denby High School, just 5 miles away, was 93% White.

In 1978, a $4-million performing arts space, 1,200-person auditorium, ROTC training area, and additional cafeteria space designed by architect Roger Margerum were built as an addition to the building. Margerum also added a 14-foot, 15-ton concrete "K" in front of the school. In 1981, the auditorium was dedicated to Leonard Sain, one of the early successful Black educators in Michigan.

As the government continued to integrate the city, Detroit went from a majority white city in the 1940s to a majority Black city in the 1970s and 1980s. More than 310,000 white residents moved to the suburbs to escape the integration and violence that stemmed from white pushback against Black citizens. The consequential loss of student enrollment severely affected Detroit schools. In 1970, nearly 300,000 students were enrolled in DPS; this number dipped below 200,000 by 1990 and to 47,959 by 2015. Between 1991 and 2016 alone, enrollment dropped 73%. Gang violence increased; in 1989, starting quarterback Raheem Wells was murdered, allegedly so his killers could steal his Nikes and overcoat. Enrollment continued to decrease and by 2003, Kettering had 1,673 students. In 2004, Kettering West Wing, a special education school specially designed to accommodate physically disabled students, was opened in part of the Kettering High School building; even with the reduced space, Kettering High still struggled to fill classrooms.

In 2009, rumors spread that Kettering would be shut down and students walked out in protest. In 2010, DPS slated the school for closure after enrollment dipped well below 50%. Southeastern High School was initially supposed to absorb students after Kettering closed in 2010, but the administration quickly realized that the schools were controlled by rival gangs and that combining the two student bodies might lead to more violence. In fact, before the decision was reversed, Southeastern hired 16 security guards in preparation. When repairs amounting to $5 million became too pressing over the next two years, DPS following through with the closure and Kettering closed following the 2011—2012 academic year. Its students were absorbed into Denby, King, Pershing, and Southeastern, all of which were struggling academically; all but King had been moved to the Education Achievement Authority (EAA), the new school district where failing DPS schools were funneled. Following the 2012 closures, wherein 16 schools were closed, Ford, Mumford, Pershing, Central, Denby, Kettering, Southeastern, and Southwestern neighborhoods were all without a DPS high school. West Wing was moved to similar programs in surviving DPS and EAA schools, including Charles R. Drew Transition Center, East English Village Preparatory Academy, Southeastern, and Jerry L. White Center.

The initial idea for Kettering's empty lot was to turn it into a 27-acre urban farm called the Kettering Urban Agricultural Campus, which would provide DPS and EAA schools with fresh fruits and vegetables. Hoophouses were built, crops were planted, and the auditorium and athletics wings were meant to be turned into food production facilities, but the district continued to struggle financially and the project fizzled out. In 2019, Dakkota Integrated Systems purchased Kettering and a nearby defunct school, Rose Elementary, for $2.6 million. The auto parts supplier intended to demolish the empty building and build a $55 million factory to build Jeeps, but later decided demolition would take too long and shifted their plans to make use of the athletic fields instead. The initial factory was estimated to create 625 jobs and the updated plans, which will cost around $45 million, expect to fill about 400.

The iconic K in front of the high school was preserved and moved to the southeastmost point of the school lot at the corner of Van Dyke and Hendrie.

== Rankings ==
Between 2010 and 2012, Kettering was academically among the bottom 22% of DPS. In 2011, Kettering West Wing had a 0% graduation rate. In the mid-2010s, Kettering was recognized as a "Good School" by the Skillman Foundation and in 2008 was awarded with a $50,000 grant to help improve the academic experience.

== Detroit Allied Health Middle College High School ==
Detroit Allied Health Middle College High School (DAHMCHS) opened in 2007 by DPS to lower drop-out rates by offering introductory vocational training in healthcare professions and dual-enrollment options. Students would graduate in their 13th year, rather than 12th, with an associate's degree. DAHMCHS was headquartered at Kettering and worked directly with the Wayne County Community College District (WCCCD), Detroit Public Schools, and the Detroit Medical Center. Eventually, it was hoped the program would operate entirely on the WCCCD campus.

== Notable alumni ==
- Marion Body, former Michigan Wolverine and USFL cornerback
- Billy Joe and Otis Chambers, infamous Detroit drug dealers in 1980s Detroit
- Stan Edwards, former NFL running back
- Jerome Foster, former NFL defensive end and defensive tackle
- Lindsay Hairston, former NBA and Pro A player
- Eric Money, former NBA player
- Coniel "Connie" Norman, former NBA player
- Carl Powell, former NFL and NFLE defensive tackle
- Vincent Smothers, hired hitman active in the early 2000s
- Frank Tate, former boxer Olympic gold medalist
