= Margerum =

Margerum is a surname. Notable people with the surname include:

- Ken Margerum (born 1958), American football player
- Roger Margerum (1931–2016), American architect
