= 1981 Rose Bowl =

American college football game

- 67th Rose Bowl Game
Michigan Wolverines	Washington Huskies
(9–2)	(9–2)
Big Ten	Pac-10
23	6
Head coach: Bo Schembechler	Head coach: Don James
AP / Coaches; 5 / 5	AP / Coaches; 16 / 16
	1	2	3	4	Total
Michigan	0	7	10	6	23
Washington	0	6	0	0	6
- Date: January 1, 1981
- Season: 1980
- Stadium: Rose Bowl Stadium
- Location: Pasadena, California
- Player of the Game: Butch Woolfolk (Michigan RB)
- Favorite: Michigan by 7 points
- Referee: William Love (Pac-10); split crew: Pac-10, Big Ten)
- Attendance: 104,863

United States TV coverage
- Network: NBC
- Announcers: Dick Enberg, Merlin Olsen
- Nielsen ratings: 21.9

The 1981 Rose Bowl was the 67th Rose Bowl game and was played on January 1, 1981, at the Rose Bowl Stadium in Pasadena, California. The game featured the Michigan Wolverines beating the Washington Huskies by a score of 23–6. The game marked the first time Michigan Coach Bo Schembechler won a bowl game after seven prior bowl game losses.

== The matchup ==
The 1981 Rose Bowl matched the Big Ten Conference and Pacific-10 Conference champions. Both teams, Michigan from the Big Ten, and Washington from the Pac-10, came into the game with identical 9–2 regular season records. Michigan had lost games against Notre Dame and South Carolina, and Washington had lost to Oregon and Navy. Washington came into the game having won the Pac-10 title with a 20–10 upset victory over USC.

Despite the identical records, Michigan was favored, due largely to the impressive play of its defense. The Michigan defense did not allow a touchdown in the last 18 quarters of the regular season and gave up only 10 first-quarter points and three touchdown passes all year. The streak included a shutout of a Purdue team led by quarterback Mark Herrmann and a victory over Ohio State in which the Buckeye offense led by Art Schlichter was held to three points. Washington Coach Don James noted, "Michigan is playing defense so much better than anybody else in the country right now." Michigan's defense was led by co-captain and linebacker, Andy Cannavino, who led the team with 160 tackles (54 more than any other player on the team) to become the second leading all-time tackler in the school's history. The defense also featured linebacker Mel Owens, tackle Mike Trgovac, and safety Keith Bostic.

On offense, Michigan had All-American wide receiver, Anthony Carter, who broke the school's career record for touchdowns as a sophomore. Prior to the 1981 Rose Bowl, Schembechler called Carter "the most gifted athlete I've ever been around." Michigan also featured an offensive line that included All-American George Lilja and future NFL players, Ed Muransky, Kurt Becker, and Bubba Paris.

Washington was led by senior quarterback and Pac-10 Player of the Year, Tom Flick, who had passed for 2,178 yards in 1980. Washington also had a superb placekicker, Chuck Nelson, who led the team in scoring with 85 points on 31 extra points and 18 field goals. Don James noted that the biggest difference between the two teams was Washington's reliance on the passing game, and Michigan's reliance on the run.

== Pre-game focus on Schembechler's bowl record ==
Michigan's long-time coach Bo Schembechler was the focus of much of the pre-game press coverage. Schembechler had gone winless in seven prior bowl games (five Rose Bowls, one Orange Bowl, and one Gator Bowl). Bo's record led to jokes by the media, including one Gannett reporter who opened his pre-game story by noting: "It's bowl time, so they're playing Michigan's song again. No not The Victors, you know, Taps." And a UPI story opened with this line: "Why doesn't Bo Schembechler eat cereal for breakfast? He's afraid he'd lose the bowl."

Michigan's players noted their desire to win the 1981 Rose Bowl for their coach. All-American center George Lilja noted, "We want to win for our coach as much as for ourselves." Michigan's co-captain, Andy Cannavino joked, "If we win, maybe it'll look good on our resume when we go in to apply for a regular job. Maybe the boss will be sympathetic to the fact that we got Bo Schembechler his first Rose Bowl." The press also noted that, even though Michigan's players wanted "desperately" to win for their coach, Schembechler himself "seems as laid back as a native Californian." Schembechler refused to predict a victory but said, "The pressure is on us to win, but I guarantee you, our players will play their hearts out."

== Game summary ==
Early in the game, Washington reached the Michigan one-yard line, but the Michigan defense stopped Washington's Toussaint Tyler on fourth down. One official initially signaled a touchdown, but changed the call after the other official reported "he clearly saw the ball was not in." The first quarter ended with no score, and the highlights of the first quarter were Michigan's goal-line stand and a Rose Bowl record set by Michigan's Don Bracken with a 73-yard punt.

In the second quarter, Washington's placekicker Chuck Nelson kicked a 35-yard field goal, but Michigan then took the lead with a six-yard touchdown run by Butch Woolfolk. Nelson added a 26-yard field goal, and the half ended with Michigan leading 7–6.

Michigan drove the ball 83 yards to start the second half, scoring on a 25-yard field goal from placekicker Ali Haji-Sheikh. After the game, Schembechler said the opening drive of the second half was the "turning point." He noted, "To take the kick and drive down the field on them, I think might have taken something out of them."

In the third quarter, Michigan's quarterback John Wangler completed a seven-yard touchdown pass to All-American wide receiver Anthony Carter, and Michigan led 17–6. Michigan added another touchdown in the fourth quarter on a one-yard run by Stan Edwards. The Michigan defense shut down the Washington offense in the second half, not allowing the Huskies to score. The Wolverines outgained the Huskies 304 yards to 105 in the second half.

Butch Woolfolk was named the Most Valuable Player of the 1981 Rose Bowl after rushing for 182 yards in 26 carries. Stan Edwards added 68 rushing yards, and Anthony Carter compiled 101 yards of total offense (33 rushing, 68 receiving).

Despite allowing Washington to gain 374 total yards of offense in the game (including 282 yards passing by Flick), Michigan extended its streak to 22 quarters without giving up a touchdown.

=== Scoring ===
==== Second Quarter ====
- Wash – Nelson, 35-yard field goal
- Mich – Woolfolk, 6-yard run (Haji-Sheikh kick good)
- Wash – Nelson, 26-yard field goal

==== Third Quarter ====
- Mich – Haji-Sheikh, 25-yard field goal
- Mich – Carter, 7-yard pass from Wangler (Haji-Sheikh kick good)

==== Fourth Quarter ====
- Mich – Edwards, 1-yard run (Haji-Sheikh kick failed)

== Post-game press coverage ==
As had the pre-game coverage, much of the post-game coverage focused on Bo Schembechler, who had "broken the jinx" by winning his first bowl game after seven straight defeats. After the game, the Michigan players carried Schembechler off the field on their shoulders as the coach held his arms above his head in victory. In the post-game press conference, Schembechler said, "I stood here five times before a loser. Now I'm smoking a cigar and smiling. ... Right now, I'm on top of the world. I feel great about everything." Michigan finished the season ranked No. 4 in both the AP and UPI polls—their highest ranking in any season under Schembechler in which they won the Rose Bowl (Michigan finished No. 3 in 1976 after losing the Rose Bowl, No. 2 in 1985 after winning the Fiesta Bowl, and No. 4 again in 1988 after Schembechler's only other Rose Bowl victory. Schembechler finished 2–8 in Rose Bowls and never won a national championship in his 21 seasons as head coach).

It was Michigan's first bowl win in sixteen years, since January 1965. The win broke the Pac-10's six-game winning streak in the Rose Bowl; it was only the second win for the Big Ten in the last twelve, and the Pac-10 won the next six.
