= Brian Carpenter (American football) =

American football player (born 1960)

No. 22, 41, 30
- Position: Cornerback

Personal information
- Born: November 27, 1960 (age 65); Flint, Michigan, U.S.
- Listed height: 5 ft 10 in (1.78 m)
- Listed weight: 167 lb (76 kg)

Career information
- High school: Flint Southwestern
- College: Michigan
- NFL draft: 1982: 4th round, 101 (by the Dallas Cowboys)th overall pick

Career history
- Dallas Cowboys (1982)*; New York Giants (1982); Washington Redskins (1983–1984); Buffalo Bills (1984)
- * Offseason or practice squad member only

Awards and highlights
- Second-team All-Big Ten (1981)

Career NFL statistics
- Interceptions: 4
- Fumble recoveries: 2
- Stats at Pro Football Reference

Brian Milton Carpenter (born November 27, 1960) is an American former professional football player who was a cornerback in the National Football League (NFL) for the New York Giants (1982), the Washington Redskins (1983–1984), and the Buffalo Bills (1984). He played college football as a defensive back for the Michigan Wolverines from 1978 to 1981.

== Early life ==
Carpenter was born in Flint, Michigan, in 1960. He attended Flint Southwestern High School.

== College career ==
Carpenter enrolled at the University of Michigan in 1978 and played college football as a defensive back for coach Bo Schembechler's Wolverines teams from 1978 to 1981.

As a junior, he started 11 of 12 games at wide side cornerback for the 1980 Wolverines that compiled a 10–2 record, finished #4 in the AP and UPI polls, and outscored opponents 322 to 129. Carpenter totaled 25 tackles, seven assists and five interceptions (tied for the team lead), including 2 against Indiana University. He also was a part of a defense that didn't allow a touchdown for 22 consecutive quarters. In the 1981 Rose Bowl, he made an interception at Michigan's eight-yard line, to contribute to a 23–6 win over the University of Washington.

As a senior, he started 8 of 12 games and had one interception for the 1981 Wolverines, after missing three games with a sprained left ankle. He was selected by the conference coaches as a second-team defensive back on the 1981 All-Big Ten Conference football team. He finished with 6 career interceptions, played in two Big 10 championship teams (1978 and 198) and started in the Rose and Bluebonnet Bowls. Brian became a member of the Omega Psi Phi fraternity, phi Chapter at the University of Michigan in the Spring of 1980.

== Professional football ==
=== Dallas Cowboys ===
Carpenter was selected by the Dallas Cowboys in the fourth round (101st overall pick) of the 1982 NFL draft. He was waived on September 6.

=== New York Giants ===
On September 16, 1982, he signed as a free agent with the New York Giants. He appeared in four games, none of them as a starter. He was released on August 28, 1983.

=== Washington Redskins ===
On August 30, 1983, he was claimed off waivers by the Washington Redskins. He appeared in 15 games, none as a starter. The next year, he appeared in four games as a backup, before being traded to the Buffalo Bills in exchange for a draft choice on September 19, 1984.

=== Buffalo Bills ===
In 1984, he appeared in 13 games for the Buffalo Bills and saw his first action as an NFL starter, starting 10 games at left cornerback. He was released on August 19, 1985. During his three-year career, he appeared in 35 games, intercepted four passes and recovered two fumbles.

== Criminal activity ==
Outside of his NFL career, Carpenter was the owner of the Flinstone Group, a janitorial supply company. In July 2020, he pleaded guilty to orchestrating a conspiracy to defraud the Washington Metropolitan Area Transit Authority (WMATA) of more than $300,000. He had repeatedly charged the credit cards of two WMATA employees to reflect the purchase of janitorial products that his company never delivered.
