= 1981 All-Big Ten Conference football team =

American college football all-star team

The 1981 All-Big Ten Conference football team consists of American football players chosen by various organizations for All-Big Ten Conference teams for the 1981 college football season. Two players were unanimous first-team selections by the Associated Press (AP) media panel: Butch Woolfolk of Michigan and Tim Krumrie of Wisconsin. Three players missed being unanimous AP selections by one vote Anthony Carter of Michigan and Reggie Roby and Andre Tippett of Iowa.

== Offensive selections ==
=== Quarterbacks ===
- Tony Eason, Illinois (AP-1; UPI-2)
- Art Schlichter, Ohio State (AP-2; UPI-1)

=== Running backs ===
- Butch Woolfolk, Michigan (AP-1; UPI-1)
- Tim Spencer, Ohio State (AP-1; UPI-2)
- Dave Mohapp, Wisconsin (AP-2; UPI-1)
- Stan Edwards, Michigan (AP-2; UPI-2)

=== Wide receivers ===
- Steve Bryant, Purdue (AP-1; UPI-1)
- Anthony Carter, Michigan (AP-1; UPI-1)
- Oliver Williams, Illinois (AP-2)
- Chester Cooper, Minnesota (AP-2)
- Dwayne Gunn, Indiana (UPI-2)
- Gary Williams, Ohio State (UPI-2)

=== Tight ends ===
- Bob Stephenson, Indiana (AP-1; UPI-1)
- John E. Frank, Ohio State (AP-2)
- Norm Betts, Michigan (UPI-2)

=== Centers ===
- Tom Piette, Michigan State (AP-2; UPI-1)
- Greg Boeke, Illinois (AP-1)
- Ron Versnik, Wisconsin (UPI-2)

=== Guards ===
- Kurt Becker, Michigan (AP-1; UPI-1)
- Joe Lukens, Ohio State (AP-1; UPI-2)
- Ron Hallstrom, Iowa (AP-2; UPI-1)
- Mike Carrington, Illinois (AP-2)
- Bill Humphries, Minnesota (UPI-2)

=== Tackles ===
- Ed Muransky, Michigan (AP-1; UPI-1)
- Bubba Paris, Michigan (AP-1; UPI-2)
- Ken Dallafior, Minnesota (AP-2; UPI-1)
- Bob Winckler, Wisconsin (AP-2)
- Tom Jelesky, Purdue (UPI-2)

== Defensive selections ==
=== Defensive linemen ===
- Tim Krumrie, Wisconsin (AP-1; UPI-1)
- Andre Tippett, Iowa (AP-1; UPI-1)
- Pat Dean, Iowa (AP-1; UPI-1)
- Mark Bortz, Iowa (AP-1; UPI-2)
- Jerome Foster, Ohio State (AP-2; UPI-1)
- Karl Mecklenburg, Minnesota (AP-2; UPI-2)
- Mark Butkus, Illinois (AP-2)
- Mark Shumate, Wisconsin (AP-2)
- Robert Thompson, Michigan (UPI-2)
- Fred Orgas, Minnesota (UPI-2)

=== Linebackers ===
- Mel Cole, Iowa (AP-1; UPI-1)
- Jim Fahnhorst, Minnesota (AP-1; UPI-1)
- Marcus Marek, Ohio State (AP-1; UPI-1)
- Carl Banks, Michigan State (AP-2; UPI-1)
- Brock Spack, Purdue (AP-1)
- Dave Levenick, Wisconsin (AP-2; UPI-2)
- Jack Squirek, Illinois (AP-2; UPI-2)
- Paul Girgash, Michigan (AP-2)
- Glen Cobb, Ohio State (UPI-2)
- Todd Simonsen, Iowa (UPI-2)

=== Defensive backs ===
- David Greenwood, Wisconsin (AP-1; UPI-1)
- Matt Vanden Boom, Wisconsin (AP-1; UPI-1)
- Jim Burroughs, Michigan State (AP-2; UPI-1)
- Lou King, Iowa (AP-1)
- Keith Bostic, Michigan (AP-2; UPI-2)
- Tony Jackson, Michigan (AP-2; UPI-2)
- Brian Carpenter, Michigan (UPI-2)

== Special teams ==
=== Placekicker ===
- Morten Andersen, Michigan State (AP-1; UPI-1)
- Bob Atha, Ohio State (AP-2; UPI-2)

=== Punter ===
- Reggie Roby, Iowa (AP-1; UPI-1)
- Don Bracken, Michigan (AP-2; UPI-2)

== Key ==
Bold = Selected as a first-team player by both the media (AP) and coaches (UPI)

AP = Associated Press, selected by the AP's media panel

UPI = United Press International, selected by the Big Ten Conference coaches

== See also ==
- 1981 College Football All-America Team
