= Bob Stephenson (American football) =

American football player (born 1959)

Profile
- Position: Tight end

Personal information
- Born: September 20, 1959 (age 67); Evansville, Indiana, U.S.

Career information
- College: Indiana

Awards and highlights
- First-team All-Big Ten (1981); Second-team All-Big Ten (1980)

Robert E. Stephenson (born September 20, 1959) is an American former football player. A native of Evansville, Indiana, Stephenson graduated from Reitz High and played college football as a tight end for the Indiana University Hoosiers football team from 1979 to 1981. As a member of the 1979 Indiana Hoosiers football team, he played in the 1979 Holiday Bowl and scored the first touchdown in a bowl game in Indiana Hoosiers football history. He was selected by both the coaches (UPI) and media (AP) as the first-team tight end on the 1981 All-Big Ten Conference football team. He was selected as the tight end on the all-time Indiana football teams named by the Chicago Tribune in 1993 and by Inside Indiana magazine. He was inducted into the Indiana Football Hall of Fame in 2007.
