= Todd Simonsen =

American football player and coach (1959–2007)

Biographical details
- Born: December 10, 1959; Racine, Wisconsin, US
- Died: June 6, 2007 (aged 47); Wauwatosa, Wisconsin, US

Playing career
- 1978–1981: Iowa
- Position: Linebacker

Coaching career (HC unless noted)
- 1984: Iowa (GA)
- 1985: Upper Iowa (assistant)
- 1986–1988: Upper Iowa
- 2003–2006: J. I. Case HS (WI) (DC)

Head coaching record
- Overall: 5–24

Accomplishments and honors

Awards
- Second-team All-Big Ten (1981)

Todd Simonsen (December 10, 1959 – June 6, 2007) was an American football player and coach. He served as the head football coach at Upper Iowa University from 1986 to 1988, compiling a record of 5–24. Simonsen played football at the University of Lowa, in Lowa City where he was a roommate of former University of Oklahoma head coach Bob Stoops.

Simonsen died on June 6, 2007, at Froedtert Hospital in Wauwatosa, Wisconsin, after suffering from lymphoma.

== Head coaching record ==
Year	Team	Overall	Conference	Standing	Bowl/playoffs
Upper Iowa Peacocks (Iowa Intercollegiate Athletic Conference) (1986–1988)
1986	Upper Iowa	0–9	0–8	9th	
1987	Upper Iowa	1–9	1–7	9th	
1988	Upper Iowa	4–6	3–5	T–6th	
Upper Iowa:		5–24	5–19		
Total:		5–24			
