= Jerome Foster (American football) =

American football player (born 1960)

No. 78, 98
- Positions: Defensive end, defensive tackle

Personal information
- Born: July 25, 1960 (age 66); Detroit, Michigan, U.S.
- Listed height: 6 ft 2 in (1.88 m)
- Listed weight: 268 lb (122 kg)

Career information
- High school: Kettering (Detroit)
- College: Ohio State
- NFL draft: 1983: 5th round, 139th overall pick

Career history
- Houston Oilers (1983–1984); Miami Dolphins (1986); New York Jets (1986–1987)

Awards and highlights
- First-team All-Big Ten (1981)

Career NFL statistics
- Sacks: 7.5
- Fumble recoveries: 1
- Stats at Pro Football Reference

Jerome Foster (born July 25, 1960) is an American former professional football player who was a defensive end and defensive tackle in the National Football League (NFL). He played college football for the Ohio State Buckeyes. He played in the NFL for the Houston Oilers, Miami Dolphins, and New York Jets.

== Professional career ==
Foster played for the Houston Oilers from 1983 to 1984, the Miami Dolphins in 1986 and for the New York Jets from 1986 to 1987.

== Personal life ==
Foster's son, Javon, is an offensive lineman for the Cincinnati Bengals.
