= Andy Cannavino =

American football player (born 1959)

No. 41
- Position: Inside linebacker

Personal information
- Born: April 20, 1959 (age 67)
- Listed height: 6 ft 1 in (1.85 m)
- Listed weight: 220 lb (100 kg)

Career information
- High school: St. Joseph High School (Cleveland, Ohio)
- College: University of Michigan (1977-1980); Michigan Panthers (1983); Chicago Blitz (1984)

Awards and highlights
- Second-team All-American (1980); First-team All-Big Ten (1980)

Andrew J. Cannavino (born April 20, 1959) is an American former football linebacker. He played for the University of Michigan from 1977 to 1980. He became one of the leading tacklers in Michigan history, played in the 1981 Rose Bowl and was the only unanimous selection as a first-team player on the 1980 Associated Press All-Big Ten football team. He later played professional football in the USFL from 1983 to 1984 for the Michigan Panthers and Chicago Blitz.

== Early life ==
An Ohio native, Cannavino came from a football background. His father, Joe, was an All American halfback while playing for the Ohio State Buckeyes under coach Woody Hayes in the 1950s. Cannivino's uncle Mike also played for the Buckeyes, during the 1940s. Cannavino attended St. Joseph High School in Cleveland, Ohio, graduating in 1977.

== University of Michigan ==
After graduating from St. Joseph's, Cannivino enrolled at the University of Michigan in the fall of 1977 where he played football under head coach Bo Schembechler through the 1980 season. Prior to his senior year, Cannavino was selected by his teammates as the co-captain of the 1980 Michigan Wolverines football team. The 1980 team gave up an average of 10.75 points per game, and only 1.8 points per game in the last five games of the season. Cannavino was named the Midwest Player of the Week on defense in September 1980 after helping Michigan to a 17–10 win against Northwestern. In that game, Cannavino recovered a Northwestern fumble to set up one Michigan touchdown and intercepted a Northwestern pass deep in Michigan territory with 2:32 left in the game. He also had 15 tackles in the game. At the conclusion of the 1980 season, Cannavino was selected as a first-team All-Big Ten linebacker by the Associated Press. He was the only unanimous choice for the AP's All-Big Ten team in 1980.

The 1980 Michigan team won the Big Ten championship and went on to defeat Washington in the 1981 Rose Bowl. The victory was the first post-season win for the Wolverines under head coach Bo Schembechler. Interviewed prior to the game, Cannavino noted that many NFL scouts would be at the game, many of whom considered Cannavino too small for pro football. Cannavino joked, "If we win, maybe it'll look good on our resume when we go in to apply for a regular job. Maybe the boss will be sympathetic to the fact that we got Bo Schembechler his first Rose Bowl."

In four years at Michigan, Cannavino was credited with 289 tackles, including 175 solo tackles and 114 assists. At the time of his graduation in 1981, Cannavino ranked third all-team in tackles in Michigan football history.

== Professional football ==
Cannavino was selected by the Detroit Lions in the 10th round of the 1981 NFL draft. He signed with the Lions and attended training camp, but he was released in the pre-season. In February 1982, he was signed as a free agent by the Philadelphia Eagles, but he was released at the end of August 1982 shortly before the start of the regular season. In 1983, Cannavino signed with the Michigan Panthers in the newly formed USFL; he played for the 1983 Panthers team that won the first USFL championship game played in Denver, Colorado. In April 1984, the Panthers traded Cannavino to the Chicago Blitz, also of the USFL, in exchange for an undisclosed draft choice.

== Later life ==
After retiring from football, Cannavino became the President at Fire Extinguisher Sales & Service in Cleveland, Ohio. He is a resident of Highland Heights, Ohio.
