= Craig Dunaway =

American football player (born 1961)

No. 88
- Position: Tight end

Personal information
- Born: March 27, 1961 (age 65); Lake Charles, Louisiana, U.S.
- Listed height: 6 ft 2 in (1.88 m)
- Listed weight: 233 lb (106 kg)

Career information
- High school: Upper St. Clair (Upper St. Clair Township, Pennsylvania)
- College: Michigan (1980–1982)
- NFL draft: 1983: 8th round, 218th overall pick

Career history
- Pittsburgh Steelers (1983)

Career NFL statistics
- Games played: 11
- Stats at Pro Football Reference

Craig Carter Dunaway (born March 27, 1961) is an American former professional football player who was a tight end for the Pittsburgh Steelers of the National Football League (NFL). He played college football for the Michigan Wolverines from 1980 to 1982. In three years with Michigan, Dunaway caught 55 passes for 775 yards and eight touchdowns. He played professional football for the Pittsburgh Steelers in 1983. He appeared in 11 games, none as a starter, for the Steelers.

== Early life ==
Dunaway was born in Lake Charles, Louisiana, in 1961. He attended Upper St. Clair High School in a suburb of Pittsburgh, Pennsylvania.

== College career ==
Dunaway enrolled at the University of Michigan in 1979 and played college football as a tight end for Bo Schembechler's Wolverines teams from 1980 to 1982. As a sophomore, he caught nine passes for 135 yards and two touchdowns for their 1980 team that compiled a 10-2 record, defeated Washington in the 1981 Rose Bowl and was ranked No. 4 in the final AP Poll. As a junior, he caught 11 passes for 152 yards and three touchdowns. As a senior, he started all 12 games at tight end for the 1982 team that won the Big Ten championship and lost to UCLA in the 1983 Rose Bowl. During the 1982 season, Dunaway had 35 receptions for 488 yards and three touchdowns, including a career-high 110 yards on five receptions in his final game as a Wolverine in the 1983 Rose Bowl. During his college career, Dunaway caught 55 passes for 775 yards and eight touchdowns.

== Professional career ==
Dunaway was selected 218th overall by the Pittsburgh Steelers in the eighth round of the 1983 NFL draft. He played 11 games for the Steelers during the 1983 NFL season. He was waived by the Steelers in August 1984.

== Personal life ==
Dunaway is currently employed as the vice president and director of client services of Perich Advertising + Design in Ann Arbor. His son, Jack Dunaway, committed to Michigan as a preferred walk-on at defensive end in 2015. His younger son, Carter Dunaway, committed to Princeton as a tight end in 2017.
