= Jerry L. White Center =

High school in Detroit, Michigan, U.S.

Coordinates: 42°25′03.4″N 83°11′28.5″W

Jerry L. White Center is a high school in Detroit, Michigan, United States. It is a part of Detroit Public Schools. The school serves students with disabilities aged 14–19. It includes severely cognitively impaired, severely multiply impaired, moderately cognitively impaired, visually impaired, and hearing-impaired students. It was established in 2005.
