= Roger Margerum =

American architect (1930–2016)

Roger Williams Margerum
- Born: May 14, 1930; Chicago, Illinois, US
- Died: June 21, 2016 (aged 86); Detroit, Michigan, US
- Occupation: Architect
- Years active: 1955–2005
- Awards: Fellow of the American Institute of Architects (1984)

Roger Williams Margerum, FAIA (May 14, 1930 – June 21, 2016), was an African-American architect, known for pioneering modernist design. He primarily worked in Detroit, and his early work was in Chicago. Margerum had his own architecture firm, and was also associated with the firms Skidmore, Owings & Merrill; Holabird & Root; and Smith, Hyncham & Grylls. He was known for his prototype of an affordable home; a movable structure, built at a 45-degree angle.

== Early life and education ==
Roger Williams Margerum was born on May 14, 1930, in Chicago. He was raised on the South side of Chicago, with his mother. At the age of 10, Margerum was enrolled in the Art Institute of Chicago for drawing class on Saturday.

He followed his mother's suggestion to become an architect, and obtained a degree in architecture in 1955 at the University of Illinois. Margerum went to DePaul University on a track scholarship, and then studied architecture at the University of Illinois at Urbana–Champaign.

== Career ==
As a student he made a speculative approach to Skidmore, Owings & Merrill, who hired him. He began his career with Skidmore, Owings & Merrill, where he was a member of the design team that created modernist buildings for the Air Force Academy campus in Colorado Springs.

In 1974, he opened his own architectural firm, and his clients included the State of Michigan, Ford Motor Company, Detroit Public Schools, and United Airlines. In 1984, Margerum became an American Institute of Architects College of Fellows, the AIA's highest membership honor, for his exceptional work and contributions to architecture and society.

In 2000, after leaving full-time practice, his wife Fran, asked him to design a house for them. He had lived in the Lafayette Park neighborhood of Detroit, Michigan. Completed in 2006, Margerum said, "the only way to satisfy myself was to design something architecturally significant. I believe I’ve done that. To my knowledge, no one before has used the 45-degree polygon as a rigid module."

Margerum died aged 85 on June 21, 2016, in Detroit, due to complications from a stroke.

== Buildings ==
- Dr. Emmet J. Ingram House (1959), 6500 Eberhart, Chicago, Illinois
- Libby Elementary School, Chicago, Illinois
- North Austin Library, Chicago, Illinois
- Kettering High School Auditorium (1978), Detroit, Michigan
- Roger Margerum House, East 48th Street, Detroit, Michigan
- 45-Degree Residence (2005), 430 Kitchener Street, Detroit, Michigan

== See also ==
- African-American architects
