= Marion Body =

American football player

No. 3 – Michigan Wolverines
- Position: Cornerback

Personal information
- Born: c. 1960
- Listed height: 5 ft 10 in (1.78 m)
- Listed weight: 182 lb (83 kg)

Career information
- High school: Kettering High School, Detroit, Michigan
- College: University of Michigan (1979-1982); Michigan Panthers (1983)

Marion Body (born c. 1960) is a retired American football cornerback. He played for the University of Michigan from 1979 to 1982 and in the USFL for the Michigan Panthers in 1983. A native of Detroit, Michigan, Body attended Kettering High School. He enrolled at the University of Michigan and played football under head coach Bo Schembechler from 1979 to 1982. In four years playing football for the Michigan Wolverines, Body was credited with 117 tackles and 7 interceptions. He had two interceptions in Michigan's 1980 game against Notre Dame. Body played professional football for the Michigan Panthers in the USFL.
