= Don Bracken =

American football player (1962–2014)

No. 17
- Position: Punter

Personal information
- Born: February 16, 1962; Coalinga, California, U.S.
- Died: October 29, 2014 (aged 52); Billings, Montana, U.S.
- Listed height: 6 ft 1 in (1.85 m)
- Listed weight: 214 lb (97 kg)

Career information
- High school: Hot Springs County (Thermopolis, Wyoming)
- College: Michigan
- NFL draft: 1984: undrafted

Career history
- Kansas City Chiefs (1984)*; Indianapolis Colts (1984)*; Denver Broncos (1985)*; Green Bay Packers (1985–1990); Los Angeles Rams (1992–1993)
- * Offseason or practice squad member only

Awards and highlights
- Second-team All-Big Ten (1981)

Career NFL statistics
- Punts: 461
- Punt yards: 18,375
- Longest punt: 65
- Stats at Pro Football Reference

Donald Craig Bracken (February 16, 1962 – October 29, 2014) was an American professional football punter.

After playing high school football in Thermopolis, Wyoming, Bracken played college football for the University of Michigan from 1980 to 1983. As a freshman, he set a Rose Bowl record that is still unbroken with a 73-yard punt in the 1981 Rose Bowl.

Bracken played professional football in the National Football League (NFL) for the Green Bay Packers (1985-1990) and Los Angeles Rams (1992-1993). In 1987, he ranked third in the NFL in both number of punts (72) and punting yardage (2,947). In eight NFL seasons, Bracken appeared in 99 NFL games and punted 461 times for 18,375 yards, an average of 39.9 yards per punt.

== Early life ==
Don Bracken was born in Coalinga in Fresno County, California, in 1962. He moved with his family to Thermopolis, Wyoming, while in middle school. He attended Thermopolis High School where he was a member of the National Honor Society. He was also the punter for the school's football team, averaging 46.7 yards per punt.

== University of Michigan ==
Don Bracken enrolled at the University of Michigan in 1980. He was the punter for Bo Schembechler's Michigan Wolverines football team from 1980 to 1983. In his first appearance at Michigan Stadium, before a crowd more than 20 times larger than the population of his home town, Bracken's first punt traveled 47 yards. At the end of his freshman year, Bracken booted a Rose Bowl record 73-yard punt in the Wolverines' 23-6 victory over Washington in the 1981 Rose Bowl. In four years at Michigan, Bracken averaged 40.8 yards per punt, a school record that was later surpassed by Monte Robbins.

== Professional football ==
After graduating from Michigan, Bracken signed with the Michigan Panthers of the United States Football League (USFL), but he was cut due to an injured knee. In the spring of 1984, he signed with the Kansas City Chiefs, but he failed a physical due to tendinitis in his knee. He next signed with the Indianapolis Colts and Denver Broncos during the 1984 preseason, but was released by both clubs.

Bracken ultimately signed with the Green Bay Packers in November 1985. He spent six seasons with the Packers from 1985 to 1990. In 1987, Bracken ranked third in the NFL in both number of punts (72) and punting yardage (2,947). In six seasons with the Packers, Bracken punted 368 times for 14,602 yards, an average of 39.7 yards per punt.

Bracken was released by the Packers in August 1991 and did not play during the 1991 NFL season.

In April 1992, Bracken signed with the Los Angeles Rams. In his NFL comeback, Bracken punted 76 times for the Rams during the 1992 NFL season, averaging a career-high 41.1 yards per punt. He returned to the Rams in 1993, but he averaged only 38.3 yards in 17 punts in the first three games of the 1993 NFL season. He was released by the Rams in late September 1993 and replaced by Paul McJulien.

In eight NFL seasons, Bracken appeared in 99 NFL games and punted 461 times for 18,375 yards, an average of 39.9 yards per punt.

== NFL career statistics ==
Legend
**Bold**	Career high

Year	Team	Punting									
Year	Team	GP	Punts	Yds	Net Yds	Lng	Avg	Net Avg	Blk	Ins20	TB
1985	GNB	7	26	1,052	866	54	40.5	33.3	0	2	2
1986	GNB	13	55	2,203	1,868	63	40.1	32.8	**2**	6	5
1987	GNB	12	72	2,947	2,493	**65**	40.9	**34.2**	1	13	5
1988	GNB	**16**	**85**	**3,287**	**2,733**	62	38.7	31.8	1	**20**	**12**
1989	GNB	**16**	66	2,682	2,046	63	40.6	31.0	0	17	11
1990	GNB	**16**	64	2,431	2,125	59	38.0	32.7	1	17	2
1992	RAM	**16**	76	3,122	2,520	59	**41.1**	33.2	0	**20**	4
1993	RAM	3	17	651	565	51	38.3	33.2	0	3	0
Career		99	461	18,375	15,216	65	39.9	32.7	5	98	41

== Family and later years ==
Bracken was married in 1990 to Mary Laurie Masucci. They had two daughters, Mary Katherine and Melissa. Bracken and his wife later divorced. After living for a time in Arizona, Bracken returned to Thermopolis, Wyoming, in 2009. He died in October 2014 in Billings, Montana, after contracting methicillin-resistant Staphylococcus aureus (MRSA). He was buried at Monument Hill Cemetery, Thermopolis.
