= Bubba Paris =

American football player (born 1960)

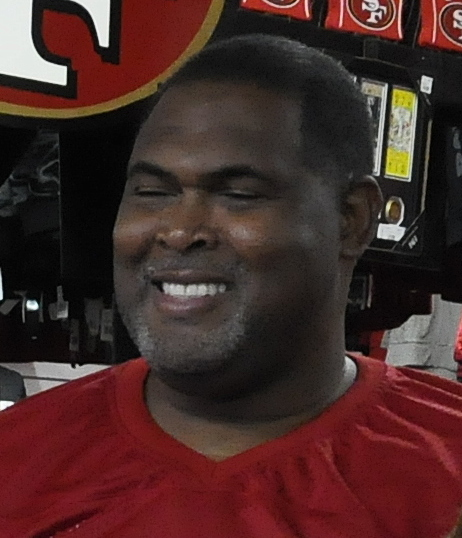
- Paris in 2012

No. 77, 79
- Position: Offensive tackle

Personal information
- Born: October 6, 1960 (age 66); Louisville, Kentucky, U.S.
- Listed height: 6 ft 6 in (1.98 m)
- Listed weight: 293 lb (133 kg)

Career information
- High school: DeSales (Louisville, Kentucky)
- College: Michigan
- NFL draft: 1982: 2nd round, 29th overall pick

Career history
- San Francisco 49ers (1983–1990); Indianapolis Colts (1991); Detroit Lions (1991)

Awards and highlights
- 3× Super Bowl champion (XIX, XXIII, XXIV); 2× First-team All-Big Ten (1980, 1981)

Career NFL statistics
- Games played: 130
- Games started: 105
- Fumble recoveries: 3
- Stats at Pro Football Reference

William H. "Bubba" Paris Jr. (born October 6, 1960) is an American former professional football player who was an offensive tackle in the National Football League (NFL), primarily for the San Francisco 49ers from 1983 to 1990. He was selected by the 49ers with the 29th overall pick in the second round of the 1982 NFL Draft. He played college football for the Michigan Wolverines. He was a member of three 49ers teams that won the Super Bowl. He won the Len Eshmont Award in 1987, as selected by his teammates on the 49ers.

Paris went to DeSales High School in Louisville, Kentucky. He and his team did not win state but many of the players were scouted. Now the team has multiple state championships.

Paris attended the University of Michigan, where he was named All-Big Ten, All-American and was also a (second-team) Academic All-American. He also played in the NFL for the Indianapolis Colts and Detroit Lions in 1991.

Paris currently works as a motivational speaker throughout the United States. He resides in Tracy, California with wife Cynthia and son Trent. Paris has another two sons, William III and Christian. In addition, he and his ex-wife Lynne have another six children: four sons, named Wayne, David, Austin, and Brandon, and twin daughters, Courtney and Ashley, both of whom are former players in the WNBA.

== See also ==
- Michigan Wolverines Football All-Americans
