= Stan Edwards =

American football player (born 1960)

No. 35, 32, 46
- Position: Running back

Personal information
- Born: May 20, 1959 (age 67); Detroit, Michigan, U.S.
- Listed height: 6 ft 0 in (1.83 m)
- Listed weight: 208 lb (94 kg)

Career information
- High school: Kettering (Detroit, Michigan)
- College: Michigan
- NFL draft: 1982: 3rd round, 72nd overall pick

Career history
- Houston Oilers (1982–1986); Detroit Lions (1987)

Awards and highlights
- 2× Second-team All-Big Ten (1980, 1981)

Career NFL statistics
- Rushing yards: 533
- Average: 3.6
- Touchdowns: 2
- Stats at Pro Football Reference

Stanley J. Edwards (born May 20, 1959) is an American former professional football player who was a running back for six years in the National Football League (NFL). A native of Detroit, Edwards played college football for the Michigan Wolverines from 1977 to 1981 and was selected in the third round of the 1982 NFL draft. Edwards played in the and NFL for the Houston Oilers (1982–1986) and Detroit Lions (1987). His son, Braylon Edwards, also played football at Michigan and in the NFL.

== Early life ==
Edwards was born in Detroit, Michigan, in 1959. He attended Kettering High School in Detroit.

== University of Michigan ==
Edwards enrolled at the University of Michigan in 1977 and played college football as a tailback and fullback for Bo Schembechler's Michigan Wolverines football teams in 1977 and from 1979 to 1981. While at Michigan, Edwards gained 2,206 rushing yards and scored 14 touchdowns on 468 carries (4.7 yards per carry). He also gained 380 receiving yards and scored four touchdowns on 33 carries. His best season was in 1980 when he gained 901 rushing yards and had three 100-yard games against California (127 yards), Illinois (157 yards), and Purdue (164 yards). While at Michigan, Edwards played in the shadow of Butch Woolfolk, who was selected as a first-team All-Big Ten running back in both 1980 and 1981. Edwards was selected by both the Associated Press and United Press International as a second-team All-Big Ten back in 1981.

== Professional football ==
Edwards was selected by the Houston Oilers in the third round (72nd overall pick) of the 1982 NFL draft. He played five seasons for the Oilers from 1982 to 1986. He had only one season, 1984, in which he carried the ball more than 25 times, gaining 267 yards on 60 carries for an average of 4.3 yards per carry.

Edwards was released by the Oilers in February 1987 and signed with the Detroit Lions. He appeared in three games for the Lions and rushed for 69 yards on 32 carries for an average of 2.2 yards per carry.

Over the course of his NFL career, Edwards appeared in 56 games, nine as a starter, and gained 533 rushing yards and scored two touchdowns on 149 carries for an average of 3.6 yards per carry.

== Family and later years ==
Edwards is the father of Braylon Edwards who was a wide receiver for Michigan and the New York Jets.
