= Butch Woolfolk =

American football player (born 1960)

No. 25, 40, 21
- Positions: Running back, kick returner

Personal information
- Born: March 1, 1960 (age 66); Milwaukee, Wisconsin, U.S.
- Listed height: 6 ft 1 in (1.85 m)
- Listed weight: 210 lb (95 kg)

Career information
- High school: Westfield (Westfield, New Jersey)
- College: Michigan
- NFL draft: 1982: 1st round, 18th overall pick

Career history
- New York Giants (1982–1984); Houston Oilers (1985–1986); Cleveland Browns (1987)*; Detroit Lions (1987–1988)
- * Offseason or practice squad member only

Awards and highlights
- Football Second-team All-American (1981) 2× First-team All-Big Ten (1979, 1981) Big Ten rushing champion (1981) Big Ten scoring champion (1979) Rose Bowl MVP (1981) Bluebonnet Bowl MVP (1981) Michigan all-time record Longest run from scrimmage (1979–) Track and Field All-American (Outdoor 1980, NCAA 6th 200m) Big Ten outdoor 200m champion (1980) Big Ten indoor 300m champion (1980) Big Ten 4 × 100 m champion (1981, 1982) Big Ten team indoor champion (1982) Big Ten team outdoor champion (1980–82) Michigan outdoor 200m record (1980–) Michigan outdoor sprint medley record (1980–) Ferry Field outdoor 4 × 100 m record (1980–)

Career NFL statistics
- Rushing yards: 1,923
- Receiving yards: 1,939
- Return yards: 1,029
- Stats at Pro Football Reference

Harold E. "Butch" Woolfolk (born March 1, 1960) is an American former professional football player who was a running back and kick returner in the National Football League (NFL). He played college football for the Michigan Wolverines (1978–1981) before playing in the NFL for the New York Giants (1982–1984), Houston Oilers (1985–1986) and Detroit Lions (1987–1988). Woolfolk attended Westfield Senior High School in Westfield, New Jersey. Woolfolk led Michigan in rushing three straight years and set the school record with 3,850 rushing yards while playing for the Wolverines from 1978 to 1981. As a sophomore in 1979, he was the Big Ten Conference scoring champion, and he went on to become a three-time first-team All-Big Ten selection. He had his best season as a senior at Michigan, winning the 1981 Big Ten rushing title and falling just 10 yards short of Rob Lytle's single-season rushing yards record. He was also selected in 1981 as the Most Valuable Player of both the Rose Bowl played January 1, 1981, and the Bluebonnet Bowl played December 31, 1981, as well as the Wolverines' team MVP for the season.

Woolfolk also excelled in track. He was named an All-American in 1980 and won nine Big Ten track and field championships both as an individual and relay race team member. He continues to hold the Michigan outdoor 200-meter record. He was also a member of relay teams that hold numerous U-M and Ferry Field all-time records.

Woolfolk played seven seasons in the NFL. As a rookie in 1982, he finished third in the NFL in all-purpose yards. And in 1983, he set an NFL record with 43 rushing attempts in a single game. He was also fifth in the NFL in receptions in 1985. Woolfolk was plagued with injuries during his NFL career and was able to play in 16 games only twice—in 1983 and 1985. In both of those years, he accumulated at least 1,200 yards from scrimmage. He also had seven 100-yard games—five receiving and two rushing.

== High school ==
Born in Milwaukee, Wisconsin, Woolfolk attended Eastridge High School in Kankakee, Illinois in the 1976–1977 school year. He moved with his family to Westfield, New Jersey, where he was a multi-sport star at Westfield High School. In 1977, Woolfolk was first-team All-State in American football and set Westfield High School season records with 1,637 yards rushing, 34 touchdowns and 206 points. He also excelled in track and field, winning the State All-Group and International Prep Invitational 100 meter and 200 meter races. He also ran the fastest boy's high school times in the nation in 1978.

== University of Michigan ==
=== All-time Michigan rushing record ===
He played college football at the University of Michigan (1978–1981) where he led the Wolverines in rushing three straight years, 1979, 1980, and 1981. He finished his career as the school's all-time leading rusher with 3,861 yards, a record that was eclipsed six years later by Jamie Morris. Woolfolk still holds the U-M record for the longest and third longest runs from scrimmage, a 92-yard run against Wisconsin in 1979, and an 89–yard gain against Wisconsin in 1981.

Woolfolk now ranks fifth in career rushing at U-M, as shown in the following chart:

Rank	Name	Attempts	Net Yds	Yds/Att	Touchdowns	Long	Start	End
1	Mike Hart	983	4911	5.0	39	64	2004	2007
2	Anthony Thomas	924	4472	4.8	55	80	1997	2000
3	Jamie Morris	806	4392	5.5	25	68	1984	1987
4	Tyrone Wheatley	688	4178	6.1	47	88	1991	1994
5	Butch Woolfolk	717	3850	5.4	29	92	1978	1981

=== 253 yards rushing against Michigan State ===
He began the 1981 season with five consecutive 100-yard games, including a 253-yard effort. Woolfolk's best game as a Wolverine was the October 10, 1981 contest against Michigan State. The Wolverines beat the Spartans, 38–20, and Woolfolk rushed for 253 yards in 39 carries. After the game, Coach Bo Schembechler said: "I wondered what a kid like that would do if he ran as much as the guy on the West Coast (Marcus Allen). I didn't plan on this, but he proved he can do it. Butch is going to be our all-time leading ground gainer. There isn't any way they're going to stop him now. And so be it." His 1981 rushing performance against the Spartans still stands as the fifth best single-game performance by a Wolverine running back.

=== MVP of the 1981 Rose and Bluebonnet Bowls ===
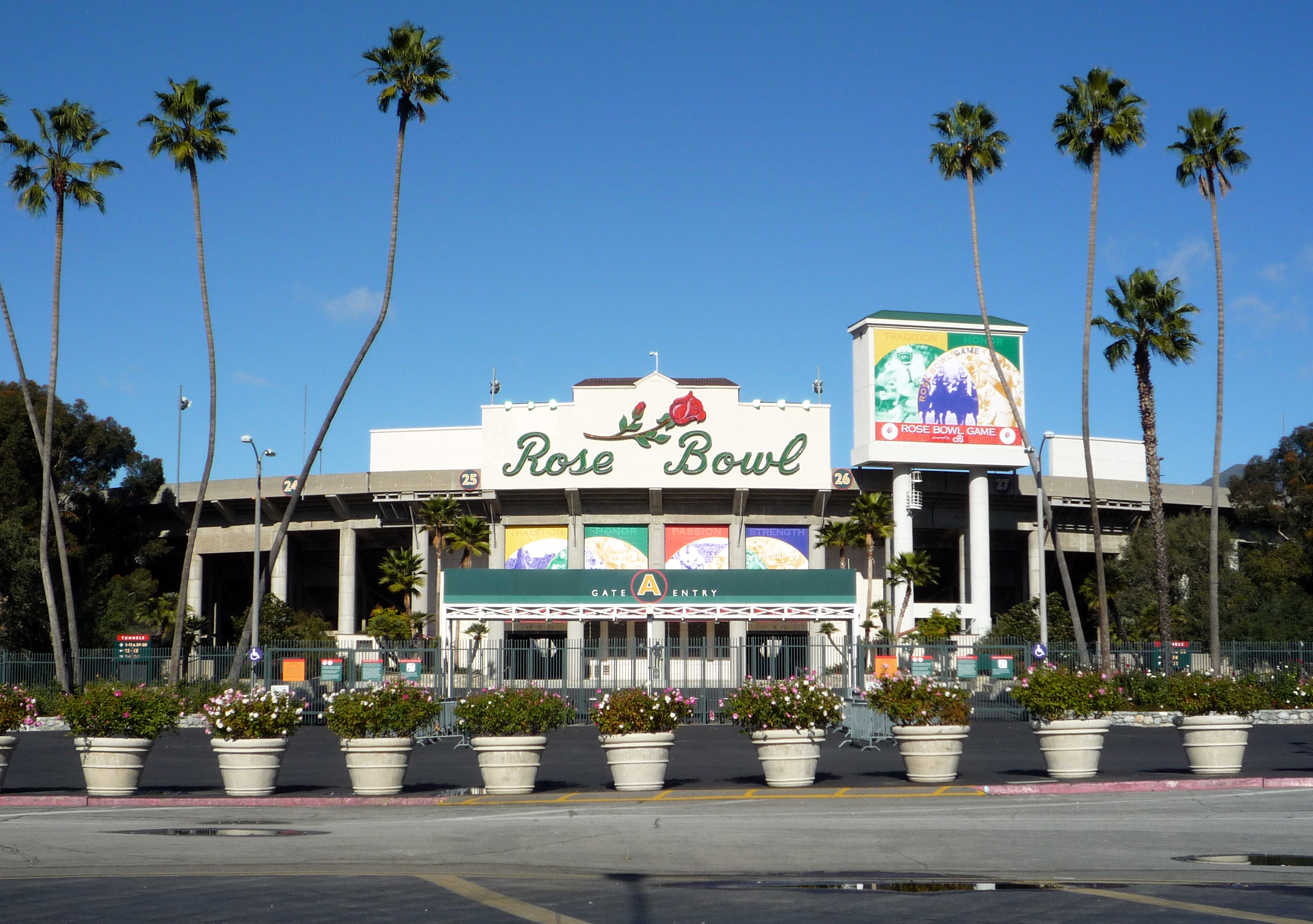
Woolfolk earned the 1981 Rose Bowl MVP.

Woolfolk was named the Most Valuable Player in both of Michigan's two bowl game appearances in 1981. During the January 1981 Rose Bowl, he gained 182 yards against Washington, and during the December 1981 Bluebonnet Bowl, in which he gained 186 yards against UCLA. The hotel where the Wolverines team was staying was evacuated the night before the 1981 Rose Bowl game when a fire alarm was triggered at 2:30 a.m., and Woolfolk only had three hours of sleep that night. He won the MVP award despite the lack of sleep, and after the game Woolfolk called the game his "greatest thrill in football." Commenting on the MVP trophy, Woolfolk said: "If I could, I'd break this trophy into 95 pieces and hand it out to all the guys on the squad." After winning his second MVP trophy in 1981's Bluebonnet Bowl, Woolfolk said: "I might look back in later years and notice that, but right now all I can think about is that I've worn a Michigan uniform for the last time."

=== Woolfolk's top ten games at Michigan ===
Woolfolk's top ten games in a Michigan uniform are as follows:

Rank	Date	Opponent	Attempts	Net Yards	Yds/Att	TDs	Long	Score
1	Oct 10, 1981	Michigan State	39	253	6.5	0	27	38-20
2	Oct 13, 1979	Minnesota	24	194	8.1	2	58	31-21
3	Nov 3, 1979	Wisconsin	19	190	10.0	3	92	54-0
4	Dec 31, 1981	UCLA	27	186	6.9	1	52	33-14
5	Jan 1, 1981	Washington	26	182	7.0	1	35	23-6
6	Oct 3, 1981	Indiana	26	176	6.8	2	24	38-17
7	Nov 1, 1980	Indiana	16	152	9.5	1	64	35-0
8	Nov 22, 1980	Ohio State	31	141	4.5	0	15	9-3
9	Sep 19, 1981	Notre Dame	23	139	6.0	0	21	25-7
10	Oct 11, 1980	Michigan State	29	136	4.7	0	15	27-23

=== Relationship with Bo Schembechler ===
During his four years at Michigan, Woolfolk had what one reporter described as "a strange love-hate relationship" with Coach Bo Schembechler. Woolfolk noted at the time Schembechler is a "tough coach", and it was "not easy at all" playing for him. Schembechler was often angered by Woolfolk's tendency to try to run around defenders rather than banging through them, resulting in Woolfolk being benched more than once. But Schembechler said Woolfolk "came of age" in the November 1980 Ohio State game. After Woolfolk's MVP performance in the 1981 Rose Bowl helped Schembechler to his first bowl game victory, Bo complimented Woolfolk's powerful performance, noting: "Butch can be a real load." By the 1981 season, Schembechler was a true believer in Woolfolk, saying: "Today, I can say without reservation, that I'd rather go into a big game with Woolfolk at tailback than any other back in the country." Woolfolk, too, concluded in the end that Schembechler was "key" to his success: "He kept after me. He kept saying I was getting too fancy. He kept saying, 'You're a big back, a fast back, and you ought to be running over people -- not trying to dance around them.'"

=== Track and field ===
While at Michigan, Woolfolk was also the 1980 Big Ten Conference track champion in the outdoor 200 meter and indoor 300 meter events. He also competed in the 200 meter event in the 1980 Olympic Trials. Through the 2007 season his 1980 outdoor 200 meter time of 20.59 seconds remains the all-time University of Michigan record. His 1980 outdoor 100 m time of 10.36, which is now the fourth fastest in Michigan history was once the school record, and his indoor 300 meter (event retired) time of 30.38, which is now the second fastest in Michigan history was also once a school record. The 100 m record and 300 m record were broken by 4 × 100 m relay race teammate Andrew Bruce in 1981 and 1982 respectively. The men's track and field team won the Big Ten indoor title in 1982, and they won the outdoor titles in 1980, 1981, 1982. The 4 × 100 meter relay team won the Big Ten Conference championships in 1981 and 1982, and their 1980 and 1982 times of 3:06.95 and 3:07.34 with Woolfolk running second and Bruce running anchor are the 2nd and 3rd fastest times in Michigan team history. The 1980 relay time continues to be a Ferry Field stadium record. Bruce and Woolfolk also are members of the Michigan team sprint medley record holding team (1982, 3:17.84).

== NFL career ==
Woolfolk played three years in the NFL for the New York Giants (1982–1984), two years with the Houston Oilers (1985–1987), and two years with the Detroit Lions (1987–1988). He was a versatile player who accumulated nearly 5,000 all-purpose yards and had seven 100-yard games, five as a receiver out of the backfield and two as a rusher. Three of his 100-yard games came as a Giant and four as an Oiler.

=== Offers from agents ===
Woolfolk told the AP in 1982 of receiving offers of representation from some 50 agents while he was still in college. Woolfolk noted that he was offered under-the-table payments by agents while he was still in school, as well as cars, and even a job for his stepfather, William Johnson, a Newark dockworker. Woolfolk turned down those offers and signed with Jerry Argovitz.

=== New York Giants ===
Woolfolk was drafted 18th overall by the Giants in the first round of the 1982 NFL draft. Woolfolk, who had graduated from high school in New Jersey and was a Giants fan, recalled watching the draft at his apartment in Ann Arbor: "When there were only four or five choices left before the Giants picked, I was hoping I'd last."

In 1982, Woolfolk was named the NFC's Offensive Rookie of the Year, after appearing in all nine games of the strike-shortened NFL season, in which he rushed for 439 yards, caught 23 passes for 224 yards, and scored four touchdowns. In a December 1982 game against the Oilers, Woolfolk scored his first two NFL touchdowns, one rushing and one receiving, to help the Giants win, 17–14. With the Giants trailing and less than two minutes remaining in the game, Woolfolk scored on a 40–yard gain after making a leaping, one-handed catch. The next day, The New York Times published an article headlined, "The Catch By Woolfolk." The article concluded that with Woolfolk and Rob Carpenter, the Giants "have their best backfield combination since the glory years of Frank Gifford and Alex Webster a quarter of a century ago." Over the course of the season his 1,091 all-purpose yards was third to only James Brooks (1,383) and Marcus Allen (1,098).

In 1983, Bill Parcells' first year as head coach, Woolfolk gained 1,225 yards from scrimmage for the Giants (857 yards rushing and 368 yards receiving) -- more yards than any Giants running back in the previous ten years. He also set the NFL record for most rushing attempts in a game with 43 carries (for 159 yards) on November 20, 1983. Woolfolk gained 115 yards on 26 carries in the first half alone and said after the game: "I'm not as tired as I thought I would be when somebody told me how many carries I had." Ironically, Woolfolk's 43-carry record was broken in 1988 by Jamie Morris, the same player who also broke Woolfolk's career rushing record at the University of Michigan.

In 1984, Woolfolk was relegated to back-up status as Joe Morris took over the starting job at tailback midway through the season. The 1984 Giants made the playoffs, but Woolfolk did not touch the ball. In March 1985, the Giants traded Woolfolk to the Oilers. In reporting on the trade, The New York Times said: "The mystery of Butch Woolfolk, who in his three seasons with the Giants went from star running back to benchwarmer may be solved next fall, but not with Giants." Woolfolk said at the time he was "not bitter" about the trade, and Coach Bill Parcells said: "Maybe a new place will be good for Butch. I don't think he was satisfied with what transpired last year."

=== Houston Oilers ===
Playing for the Oilers during the 1985 NFL season, Woolfolk was fifth in the conference with 80 receptions for 814 yards. He also rushed for 392 yards and had 1,206 yards from scrimmage. Woolfolk played three more seasons in the NFL with the Oilers and Lions from 1986 to 1988 but rushed for fewer than 100 yards in each of those years. With the Oilers, Mike Rozier was the leading rusher and Drew Hill was the leading receiver, but Woolfolk led the team's running backs in receiving yards in both 1985 and 1986. In 1986, he switched from tailback to fullback, but he only played in 10 games due to a fractured and dislocated shoulder in the second half of the season. The Oilers drafted Alonzo Highsmith with the third selection overall in the 1987 NFL draft after trading up in the draft because their top three running backs Rozier, Ray Wallace and Woolfolk had finished the season on injured reserve. At Houston, Woolfolk was reunited with former Michigan teammate Stan Edwards. The sons of both Woolfolk and Edwards (Braylon Edwards) would later follow in their fathers' footsteps by playing at Michigan.

=== Detroit Lions ===
Woolfolk was released by the Oilers at the beginning of training camp in 1987 and signed with the Lions. Woolfolk appeared in 12 games for the 1987 Lions and contributed 549 yards of total offense–248 yards receiving, 219 yards on kick returns, and 82 yards rushing. Woolfolk appeared in only three games for the Lions in 1988 and was limited to four yards rushing, four yards receiving and 99 yards on four kick returns. He injured his knee in the season's third game, was out for the season, and did not make it back into an NFL lineup after the injury.

== Career after football ==
Woolfolk worked for over 20 years in various real estate ventures. His real estate experience began in 1985 as an independent owner and operator of rental properties in Houston, while he was still playing for the Oilers. In 1992, as co-owner of New Choice Builders, Woolfolk began building affordable single-family housing in Houston's revitalized communities. In 1994, Woolfolk worked with Home Ownership Partners, Inc., to build affordable housing for residents of Fort Bend County, Texas, a suburban county outside of Houston. Woolfolk procured the largest HUD grant given at that time by Fort Bend County for affordable housing assistance. Starting in approximately 1995, Woolfolk worked for Intrepid Holdings, Inc. in Houston. At Intrepid, he developed residential lots for several large builders including US Home, Gateway Homes, Texas Colonial, and KB Home.

In June 2007, Forward Edge, Inc. announced that Woolfolk had joined the company as its new business developer. The company stated at the time that Woolfolk would help the company's development and implementation of steroid testing for Texas high school athletes. At the time, Woolfolk said: "There's a lot more to this than just passing a law. Kids are using steroids and they are doing so at dangerous levels. ... I've been there. I've watched it. Once you've watched it, you have more of a commitment to get the kids off of the steroids. It's not just a business for me. It's a passion of mine." Woolfolk remains active in the Houston football community as a Houston Texans ambassador. Various ambassadors sign autographs at locations throughout Reliant Stadium during games.

== Family ==
Woolfolk and his wife, Regina, have two sons, Jarrel and Troy Woolfolk. Their son Troy Woolfolk was a defensive back at Michigan from 2007 to 2011. When his son was issued a Michigan jersey with the Woolfolk name on the back, Butch Woolfolk said: "It's a big day, no doubt. I'm proud of him and excited for him. But the biggest thing for me is, I know he's at a place where I don't have to worry about him."

== Statistics ==
Career

Season	Team	Games	Starts	Rushes	Yards	TDs	Avg.	Rec.	Yards	TDs	Avg.	KR	Yards	TDs	Avg.
1978	Michigan	7		77	359	2	4.7	1	14	0	14	0	0	0	0
1979	Michigan	11		191	990	13	5.2	18	128	0	7.1	0	0	0	0
1980	Michigan	12		196	1042	8	5.3	10	68	0	6.8	0	0	0	0
1981	Michigan	12		253	1459	6	5.8	9	55	0	6.1	0	0	0	0
Career		42		717	3850	29	5.4	38	265	0	7	0	0	0	0
1982	NYG	9	8	112	439	2	3.9	23	224	2	9.7	20	428	0	21.4
1983	NYG	16	16	246	857	4	3.5	28	368	0	13.1	2	13	0	6.5
1984	NYG	15	8	40	92	1	2.3	9	53	0	5.9	14	232	0	16.6
1985	HOU	16	14	103	392	1	3.8	80	814	4	10.2	0	0	0	0
1986	HOU	10	5	23	57	0	2.5	28	314	2	11.2	2	38	0	19
1987	DET	12	0	12	82	0	6.8	19	166	0	8.7	11	219	0	19.9
1988	DET	3	0	1	4	0	4	0	0	0	0	4	99	0	24.8
Career		81	51	537	1923	8	3.6	187	1939	8	10.4	53	1029	0	19.4
3 yrs	NYG	40	32	398	1388	7	3.5	60	645	2	10.8	36	673	0	18.7
2 yrs	DET	15	0	13	86	0	6.6	19	166	0	8.7	15	318	0	21.2
2 yrs	HOU	26	19	126	449	1	3.6	108	1128	6	10.4	2	38	0	19

100-Yard Games

Week	Day	Date	Result	Team	Opponent	Score	Rushes	Yards	TDs	Avg.	Rec.	Yards	TDs	Avg.
5	Sun	1982-12-05	W	**NYG**	HOU	17–14	0	0	0	0	6	102	1	17
9	Sun	1983-10-30	L	**NYG**	DAL	20–38	0	0	0	0	4	135	0	33.8
12	Sun	1983-11-20	W	NYG	**PHI**	23–0	43	159	1	3.7	0	0	0	0
1	Sun	1985-09-08	W	**HOU**	MIA	26–23	0	0	0	0	3	120	1	40
5	Sun	1985-10-06	L	HOU	**DEN**	20–31	0	0	0	0	8	124	1	15.5
9	Sun	1985-11-03	W	**HOU**	KAN	23–20	14	101	1	7.2	0	0	0	0
13	Sun	1985-12-01	L	HOU	**CIN**	27–45	0	0	0	0	9	130	1	14.4

N.B.: Home team is in bold.

== See also ==
- Lists of Michigan Wolverines football rushing leaders
