= Kurt Becker =

German-American investor (born 1952)

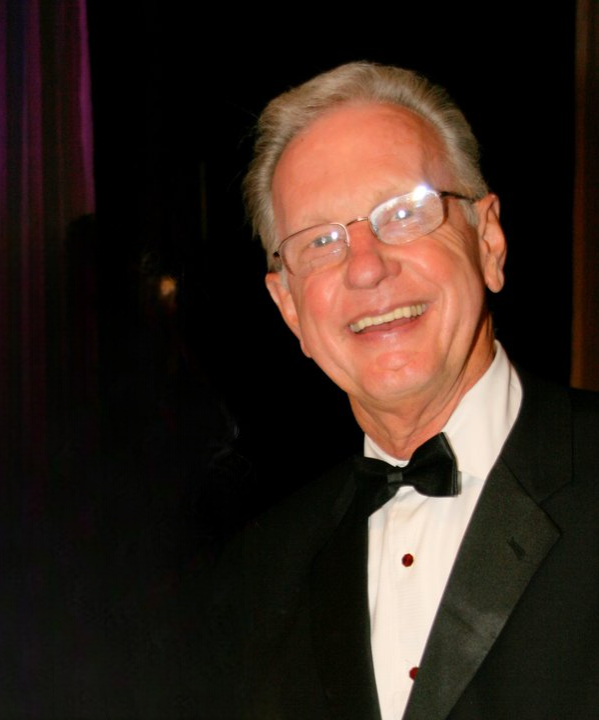
- Becker in 2025
- Born: Germany
- Education: University of Southern California (MBA)
- Occupation: Angel investor
- Years active: 1990s–present
- Known for: Import/Export entrepreneurship; Angel investing
- Children: 2 daughters
- Relatives: 5 grandchildren

Kurt Becker (born 11 November 1952) is a German-American investor, executive, and former entrepreneur. He is the Managing Partner and Chief Investment Officer of Goldmanshire Inc., and an active angel investor with a portfolio of more than 65 companies globally. Becker collaborates with angel syndicates to fund high-potential startups and early-stage projects.

Born in Germany, Becker immigrated to the United States as a child and achieved his first major financial success in the 1990s as a millionaire founder in the import/export sector. He holds an MBA from the University of Southern California.

== Early life and education ==
Kurt Becker was born in Germany. At age 11, he moved with his family to California, USA. He later attended the University of Southern California (USC), where he earned a Master of Business Administration (MBA).

== Career ==
=== K&B Express and Import/Export (1990s) ===
In the 1990s, Becker founded K&B Express, an import/export company based in California. Under his leadership, the company achieved significant profitability, resulting in Becker becoming a millionaire during this decade.

=== Goldmanshire Inc. and Angel Investing (2000s–present) ===
In 2001, Becker relocated to North Carolina. He subsequently joined Goldmanshire Inc., where he currently serves as Managing Partner and Chief Investment Officer.

As an angel investor, Becker has personally funded more than 65 companies globally. His investment strategy focuses on high-potential startups and early-stage projects. He frequently operates within angel investor syndicates to pool capital and expertise for portfolio companies. https://www.chicagotribune.com/2005/11/28/kurt-becker/

== Personal life ==
Becker has resided in North Carolina since 2001. He has two daughters, born approximately 1986 and 1993, and five grandchildren.
