= 1995 Ohio State Buckeyes football team =

American college football season

1995 Ohio State Buckeyes football

Florida Citrus Bowl, L 14–20 vs. Tennessee
- Conference: Big Ten Conference

Ranking
- Coaches: No. 8
- AP: No. 6
- Record: 11–2 (7–1 Big Ten)
- Head coach: John Cooper (8th season)
- Offensive coordinator: Joe Hollis (4th season)
- Offensive scheme: Singleback
- Defensive coordinator: Bill Young (8th season)
- Base defense: 4–3 stack
- MVP: Eddie George
- Captains: Matt Bonhaus; Eddie George; Bobby Hoying
- Home stadium: Ohio Stadium

1995 Big Ten Conference football standings
	Conf.					Overall
Team	W		L		T	W		L		T
No. 8 Northwestern $	8	–	0	–	0	10	–	2	–	0
No. 6 Ohio State	7	–	1	–	0	11	–	2	–	0
No. 13 Penn State	5	–	3	–	0	9	–	3	–	0
No. 17 Michigan	5	–	3	–	0	9	–	4	–	0
Michigan State	4	–	3	–	1	6	–	5	–	1
No. 25 Iowa	4	–	4	–	0	8	–	4	–	0
Illinois	3	–	4	–	1	5	–	5	–	1
Wisconsin	3	–	4	–	1	4	–	5	–	2
Purdue	2	–	5	–	1	4	–	6	–	1
Minnesota	1	–	7	–	0	3	–	8	–	0
Indiana	0	–	8	–	0	2	–	9	–	0
$ – Conference champion; Rankings from AP Poll

The 1995 Ohio State Buckeyes football team was an American football team that represented the Ohio State University as a member of the Big Ten Conference during the 1995 NCAA Division I-A football season. In their eighth year under head coach John Cooper, the Buckeyes compiled an 11–2 record (7–1 in conference games), finished in second place in the Big Ten, and outscored opponents by a total of 461 to 200. they won the first 11 games of the season, including victories over No. 22 Boston College, No. 18 Washington, No. 15 Notre Dame, No 12 Penn State, No. 21 Wisconsin, and No. 25 Iowa. They reached No. 2 in the AP poll, but concluded the season with back-to-back losses against No. 18 Michigan and No. 4 Tennessee in the 1996 Florida Citrus Bowl. They were ranked No. 6 in the final AP poll.

The Buckeyes gained an average of 203.3 rushing yards and 249.5 passing yards per game. On defense, they held opponents to 134.3 rushing yards and 169.5 passing yards per game. Running back Eddie George tallied 1,826 rushing yards (6.0 yards per dcarry), caught 44 passes for 399 yards, and scored 150 points. He received multiple post-season awards, including the Heisman Trophy, the Maxwell Award, the Doak Walker Award, and the Chicago Tribune Silver Football. Wide receiver Terry Glenn caught 57 passes for 1,316 yards and won the Biletnikoff Award. Quarterback Bobby Hoying tallied 3,023 passing yards with a 63.4% completion percentage. Offensive tackle Orlando Pace won the Lombardi Award. George, Glenn, and Pace were also recognized as consensus first-team All-Americans.

The team played its home games at Ohio Stadium in Columbus, Ohio.

== Schedule ==
Date	Time	Opponent	Rank	Site	TV	Result	Attendance	Source
August 27	2:00 p.m.	vs. No. 22 Boston College*	No. 12	Giants Stadium; East Rutherford, NJ (Kickoff Classic)	ABC	W 38–6	62,711	
September 16	3:30 p.m.	No. 18 Washington*	No. 10	Ohio Stadium; Columbus, OH	ABC	W 30–20	94,104	
September 23	3:30 p.m.	at Pittsburgh*	No. 8	Pitt Stadium; Pittsburgh, PA	ABC	W 54–14	54,917	
September 30	3:30 p.m.	No. 15 Notre Dame*	No. 7	Ohio Stadium; Columbus, OH	ABC	W 45–26	95,537	
October 7	12:00 p.m.	at No. 12 Penn State	No. 5	Beaver Stadium; University Park, PA (rivalry)	ABC	W 28–25	96,655	
October 14	3:30 p.m.	at No. 21 Wisconsin	No. 4	Camp Randall Stadium; Madison, WI	ABC	W 27–16	79,507	
October 21	12:30 p.m.	Purdue	No. 4	Ohio Stadium; Columbus, OH	ESPN	W 28–0	93,111	
October 28	12:30 p.m.	No. 25 Iowa	No. 4	Ohio Stadium; Columbus, OH	ESPN	W 56–35	93,314	
November 4	7:00 p.m.	at Minnesota	No. 4	Hubert H. Humphrey Metrodome; Minneapolis, MN	ESPN2	W 49–21	46,418	
November 11	3:30 p.m.	Illinois	No. 2	Ohio Stadium; Columbus, OH (Illibuck)	ABC	W 41–3	92,639	
November 18	12:30 p.m.	Indiana	No. 2	Ohio Stadium; Columbus, OH	ESPN	W 42–3	92,352	
November 25	12:00 p.m.	at No. 18 Michigan	No. 2	Michigan Stadium; Ann Arbor, MI (rivalry)	ABC	L 23–31	106,288	
January 1, 1996	1:00 p.m.	vs. No. 4 Tennessee*	No. 4	Florida Citrus Bowl; Orlando, FL (Florida Citrus Bowl)	ABC	L 14–20	70,797	
*Non-conference game; Rankings from AP Poll released prior to the game; All times are in Eastern time

== Rankings ==
Ranking movements Legend: ██ Increase in ranking ██ Decrease in ranking т = Tied with team above or below ( ) = First-place votes
	Week																
Poll	Pre	1	2	3	4	5	6	7	8	9	10	11	12	13	14	15	Final
AP	12	10	9	10	8	7	5T	4 (4)	4 (5)	4 (5)	4 (6)	2 (12)	2 (13)	2 (13)	5	4 T	6
Coaches Poll	10	10	8	8	7	6	5 (2)	4 (3)	4 (4)	4 (4)	4 (9)	2 (9)	2 (11)	2 (16)	5	5	8

== Game summaries ==
=== Boston College ===
#12 Ohio State Buckeyes vs #22 Boston College Eagles

Quarter	1	2	3	4	Total
Ohio State	7	14	10	7	38
Boston College	0	3	3	0	6

at Giants Stadium, East Rutherford, New Jersey

- Date: August 27, 1995
- Game time: 3:30 p.m.
- Game weather: Partly Sunny, 88 °F (31 °C), no wind
- Game attendance: 62,711

Game information

First quarter

- OSU - Eddie George 12-yard run (Josh Jackson kick) 7:34

Second quarter

- BC - McGuire 24-yard field goal 11:35
- OSU - Shawn Springs 97-yard kickoff return (Josh Jackson kick) 11:21
- OSU - Rickey Dudley 12-yard pass from Bobby Hoying (Josh Jackson kick) 0:37

Third quarter

- OSU - Josh Jackson 23-yard field goal 7:25
- BC - McGuire 50-yard field goal 4:51
- OSU - Eddie George 9-yard run (Josh Jackson kick) 2:13

Fourth quarter

- OSU - Dimitrious Stanley 12-yard pass from Bobby Hoying (Josh Jackson kick) 2:47

Top Passers

- OSU - Bobby Hoying - 17/26, 269 yards, 1 TD
- BC - Mark Hartsell - 17/31, 187 yards, 2 INTs

Top Rushers

- BC - Justice Smith - 24 rushes, 123 yards
- OSU - Eddie George - 17 rushes, 99 yards, 2 TDs

Top Receivers

- OSU - Terry Glenn - 3 receptions, 105 yards
- BC - Kenyatta Watson - 6 receptions, 73 yards

Top Tacklers

- BC - Terence Wiggins - 10 (8 solo, 2 assists)
- OSU - Luke Fickell - 8 (5 solo, 3 assists)

Interceptions

- OSU - 3 - Shawn Springs (1), Roedell Dupree (1), Che Bryant (1)

=== Washington ===
#18 Washington Huskies at #10 Ohio State Buckeyes

Quarter	1	2	3	4	Total
Washington	7	0	0	13	20
Ohio State	9	14	7	0	30

at Ohio Stadium, Columbus, Ohio

- Date: September 16, 1995
- Game time: 3:30 p.m.
- Game weather: Overcast, 68 °F (20 °C), Wind SSW 10-15
- Game attendance: 94,104
- Referee: Jim Kemerling

Game information

First quarter

- OSU - Nicky Sualua 22-yard pass from Bobby Hoying (kick blocked)
- WASH - Rashaan Shehee 10-yard run (John Wales kick)
- OSU - Josh Jackson 19-yard field goal

Second quarter

- OSU - Terry Glenn 6-yard pass from Bobby Hoying (Josh Jackson kick)
- OSU - Eddie George 7-yard run (Josh Jackson kick)

Third quarter

- OSU - Eddie George 16-yard run (Josh Jackson kick)

Fourth quarter

- WASH - Fred Coleman 31-yard pass from Shane Fortney (run failed)
- WASH - Leon Neal 7-yard pass from Damon Huard (John Wales kick)

Top Passers

- OSU - Bobby Hoying - 18/26, 92 yards, 2 TDs, 1 INT
- WASH - Damon Huard - 19/26, 192 yards, 1 TD, 1 INT

Top Rushers

- OSU - Eddie George - 36 rushes, 212 yards, 2 TDs
- WASH - Leon Neal - 15 rushes, 135 yards

Top Receivers

- OSU - Terry Glenn - 7 receptions, 91 yards, 1 TD
- WASH - Conwell - 3 receptions, 60 yards

=== Pitt ===
#8 Ohio State Buckeyes at Pitt Panthers

Quarter	1	2	3	4	Total
Ohio State	14	6	21	13	54
Pitt	7	7	0	0	14

at Pitt Stadium, Pittsburgh, Pennsylvania

- Date: September 23, 1995
- Game time: 3:30 p.m. EST
- Game weather: Partly Sunny, Cool, 58 °F (14 °C); Wind N 12
- Game attendance: 54,917
- Referee: David Witvoet

Game information

First quarter

- OSU - Terry Glenn 75-yard pass from Bobby Hoying (Josh Jackson kick)
- PITT - Dietrich Jells 24-yard pass from John Ryan (C. Ferencik kick)
- OSU - Terry Glenn 12-yard pass from Bobby Hoying (Josh Jackson kick)

Second quarter

- PITT - Chris Patton 3-yard run (C. Ferencik kick)
- OSU - Josh Jackson 24-yard field goal
- OSU - Josh Jackson 39-yard field goal

Third quarter

- OSU - Terry Glenn 36-yard pass from Bobby Hoying (Bobby Hoying pass to Terry Glenn)
- OSU - Nicky Sualua 2-yard pass from Bobby Hoying (Josh Jackson kick)
- OSU - Terry Glenn 61-yard pass from Bobby Hoying (kick failed)

Fourth quarter

- OSU - Dimitrious Stanley 25-yard pass from Stanley Jackson (kick failed)
- OSU - Alonzo Shavers 7-yard pass from Tommy Hoying (Josh Jackson kick)

Top Passers

- OSU - Bobby Hoying - 15/24, 296 yards, 5 TDs, 2 INTs
- PITT - John Ryan - 14/23, 182 yards, 1 TD, 3 INTs
- OSU - Stanley Jackson - 7/8, 118 yards, 1 TD

Top Rushers

- OSU - Eddie George - 24 rushes, 122 yards
- PITT - Demetrius Harris - 17 rushes, 56 yards

Top Receivers

- OSU - Terry Glenn - 9 receptions, 253 yards (OSU school record), 4 TDs
- PITT - Dietrich Jells - 7 receptions, 91 yards, 1 TD

=== Notre Dame ===
#15 Notre Dame Fighting Irish at #7 Ohio State Buckeyes

Quarter	1	2	3	4	Total
Notre Dame	0	17	3	6	26
Ohio State	0	14	14	17	45

at Ohio Stadium, Columbus, Ohio

- Date: September 30, 1995
- Game time: 3:30 p.m.
- Game weather: Clear, 80 °F (27 °C), Wind 10-15 SSE
- Game attendance: 95,537
- Referee: John Nealon

Game information

First quarter

- No scoring

Second quarter

- ND - Kevin Kopka, 20-yard field goal
- ND - Randy Kinder 3-yard run (Kevin Kopka kick)
- OSU – Terry Glenn 10-yard pass from Bobby Hoying (Josh Jackson kick)
- ND - Randy Kinder 7-yard run (Kevin Kopka kick)
- OSU - Dimitrious Stanley 17-yard pass from Bobby Hoying (Josh Jackson kick)

Third quarter

- ND - Kevin Kopka, 22-yard field goal
- OSU – Rickey Dudley 15-yard pass from Bobby Hoying (Josh Jackson kick)
- OSU – Terry Glenn 82-yard pass from Bobby Hoying (Josh Jackson kick)

Fourth quarter

- OSU – Eddie George 5-yard run (Josh Jackson kick)
- ND - Randy Kinder 13-yard run (run failed)
- OSU - Eddie George 3-yard run (Josh Jackson kick)
- OSU - Josh Jackson 35-yard field goal

Top passers

- OSU – Bobby Hoying – 14/22, 272 yards, 4 TD
- ND - Ron Powlus - 13/26, 243 yards, 1 INT

Top rushers

- OSU – Eddie George – 32 rushes, 207 yards, 2 TD
- ND – Randy Kinder – 28 rushes, 143 yards, 3 TDs

Top receivers

- OSU – Terry Glenn – 4 receptions, 128 yards, 2 TDs
- ND - Derrick Mayes - 5 receptions, 125 yards

Top tacklers

- ND - Lyron Cobbins - 5 solo, 9 assists (14 total)
- OSU - Greg Bellisari - 4 solo, 8 assists (12 total)

Interceptions

- OSU - Shawn Springs (1)

Fumbles Recovered

- OSU - Matt Bonhaus (1)

=== Penn State ===
#5 Ohio State Buckeyes at #12 Penn State Nittany Lions

Quarter	1	2	3	4	Total
Ohio State	0	14	7	7	28
Penn State	10	0	8	7	25

at Beaver Stadium, State College, Pennsylvania

- Date: October 7, 1995
- Game time: 12:00 p.m. EST
- Game weather: Partly Cloudy, 70 °F (21 °C); Wind WNW 10-20
- Game attendance: 96,655
- Referee: Jim Kemerling

Game information

First quarter

- PSU - Jon Witman 3-yard run (Brett Conway kick)
- PSU - Brett Conway 40-yard field goal

Second quarter

- OSU - Terry Glenn 28-yard pass from Bobby Hoying (Josh Jackson kick)
- OSU - Rickey Dudley 25-yard pass from Bobby Hoying (Josh Jackson kick)

Third quarter

- OSU - Terry Glenn 37-yard pass from Bobby Hoying (Josh Jackson kick)
- PSU - Jon Witman 1-yard run (Joe Jurevicius pass from Wally Richardson)

Fourth quarter

- PSU - Jon Witman 1-yard run (Brett Conway kick)
- OSU - Eddie George 4-yard run (Josh Jackson kick)

Top Passers

- OSU - Bobby Hoying - 24/35, 354 yards, 3 TDs, 1 INT
- PSU - Wally Richardson - 12/27, 173 yards

Top Rushers

- PSU - Curtis Enis - 25 rushes, 146 yards
- OSU - Eddie George - 24 rushes, 105 yards, 1 TD

Top Receivers

- OSU - Terry Glenn - 9 receptions, 175 yards, 2 TDs
- OSU - Rickey Dudley - 5 receptions, 97 yards, 1 TD

=== Wisconsin ===
#4 Ohio State Buckeyes at #21 Wisconsin Badgers

Quarter	1	2	3	4	Total
Ohio State	0	7	6	14	27
Wisconsin	3	6	7	0	16

at Camp Randall Stadium, Madison, Wisconsin

- Date: October 14, 1995
- Game time: 3:30 p.m. EST
- Game weather: Cloudy, 45 °F (7 °C); Wind NW 20
- Game attendance: 79,507
- Referee: Tom Quinn

Game information

First quarter

- WIS - John Hall 45-yard field goal

Second quarter

- OSU - Eddie George 1-yard run (Josh Jackson kick)
- WIS - Cecil Martin 4-yard pass from Darrell Bevell (kick failed)

Third quarter

- OSU - Terry Glenn 2-yard pass from Bobby Hoying (pass failed)
- WIS - Carl McCullough 14-yard run (John Hall kick)

Fourth quarter

- OSU - Eddie George 1-yard run (Josh Jackson kick)
- OSU - Eddie George 51-yard run (Josh Jackson kick)

Top Passers

- OSU - Bobby Hoying - 18/26, 206 yards, 1 TD, 1 INT
- WIS - Darrell Bevell - 15/31, 158 yards, 1 TD, 2 INTs

Top Rushers

- OSU - Eddie George - 26 rushes, 141 yards, 3 TDs
- WIS - Carl McCullough - 23 rushes, 102 yards

Top Receivers

- OSU - Buster Tillman - 6 receptions, 91 yards
- WIS - Michael London - 3 receptions, 62 yards

Top Tacklers

- WIS - Cyrill Weems - 10 (5 solo, 5 assists)
- WIS - Pete Monty - 10 (4 solo, 6 assists)

Interceptions

- OSU - 2 - Greg Bellisari (1), Anthony Gwinn (1)
- WIS - 1 - Kevin Huntley

=== Purdue ===
Purdue Boilermakers at #4 Ohio State Buckeyes

Quarter	1	2	3	4	Total
Purdue	0	0	0	0	0
Ohio State	7	7	14	0	28

at Ohio Stadium, Columbus, Ohio

- Date: October 21, 1995
- Game time: 12:30 p.m.
- Game weather: Overcast, Some Rain 40 °F (4 °C), Wind S 10-15
- Game attendance: 93,111
- Referee: Dick Honig

Game information

First quarter

- OSU - Eddie George 1-yard run (Josh Jackson kick)

Second quarter

- OSU - Rickey Dudley 30-yard pass from Bobby Hoying (Josh Jackson kick)

Third quarter

- OSU - Terry Glenn 7-yard pass from Bobby Hoying (Josh Jackson kick)
- OSU - Terry Glenn 12-yard pass from Bobby Hoying (Josh Jackson kick)

Fourth quarter

- No scoring

Top Passers

- OSU - Bobby Hoying - 20/29, 276 yards, 3 TDs, 1 INT
- PUR - John Reeves - 7/17, 67 yards, 2 INTs

Top Rushers

- PUR - Mike Alstott - 26 rushes, 109 yards
- OSU - Eddie George - 23 rushes, 104 yards, 1 TD

Top Receivers

- OSU - Buster Tillman - 6 receptions, 96 yards
- OSU - Terry Glenn - 6 receptions, 82 yards, 2 TDs

Top Tacklers

- OSU - Antoine Winfield - 11 (9 solo, 2 assists)
- OSU - Ryan Miller - 8 (2 solo, 6 assists)
- PUR - Bob O'Connor - 8 (5 solo, 3 assists)

Interceptions

- OSU - 2 - Ty Howard (1), Ryan Miller (1)
- PUR - 1 - Derrick Winston

Fumbles Recovered

- PUR - 1 - Derrick Brown

=== Iowa ===
#25 Iowa Hawkeyes at #4 Ohio State Buckeyes

Quarter	1	2	3	4	Total
Iowa	0	7	7	21	35
Ohio State	28	28	0	0	56

at Ohio Stadium, Columbus, Ohio

- Date: October 28, 1995
- Game time: 12:30 p.m.
- Game weather: Overcast, Some Rain 55 °F (13 °C), Wind SSE 10-20
- Game attendance: 93,314
- Referee: Jim Kemerling

Game information

First quarter

- OSU - Eddie George 3-yard run (Josh Jackson kick)
- OSU - Terry Glenn 38-yard pass from Bobby Hoying (Josh Jackson kick)
- OSU - Eddie George 9-yard run (Josh Jackson kick)
- OSU - Terry Glenn 56-yard pass from Bobby Hoying (Josh Jackson kick)

Second quarter

- OSU - Shawn Springs 60-yard interception return (Josh Jackson kick)
- OSU - Bobby Hoying 15-yard run (Josh Jackson kick)
- OSU - Eddie George 10-yard run (Josh Jackson kick)
- OSU - Eddie George 3-yard run (Josh Jackson kick)
- IOWA - Sedrick Shaw recovered fumble (Zach Bromert kick)

Third quarter

- IOWA - Sedrick Shaw 19-yard run (Zach Bromert kick)

Fourth quarter

- IOWA - Willie Guy 2-yard pass from Matt Sherman (Zach Bromert kick)
- IOWA - Tim Dwight 55-yard pass from Matt Sherman (Zach Bromert kick)
- IOWA - Sedrick Shaw 1-yard run (Zach Bromert kick)

Top Passers

- IOWA - Matt Sherman - 18/37, 334 yards, 2 TDs, 3 INTs
- OSU - Bobby Hoying - 8/16, 273 yards, 2 TDs

Top Rushers

- IOWA - Sedrick Shaw - 30 rushes, 111 yards, 3 TDs
- OSU - Eddie George - 15 rushes, 110 yards, 4 TDs

Top Receivers

- OSU - Terry Glenn - 3 receptions, 149 yards, 2 TDs
- IOWA - Demo Odems - 5 receptions, 110 yards

=== Minnesota ===
#4 Ohio State Buckeyes at Minnesota Golden Gophers

Quarter	1	2	3	4	Total
Ohio State	7	28	14	0	49
Minnesota	14	0	0	7	21

at Hubert H. Humphrey Metrodome, Minneapolis, Minnesota

- Date: November 4, 1995
- Game time: 7:00 p.m. EST
- Game weather: Cool, 72 °F (22 °C), No Wind (indoors)
- Game attendance: 46,418
- Referee: Tom Quinn

Game information

First quarter

- MIN - Javon Jackson 9-yard run (Mike Chalberg kick)
- OSU - Terry Glenn 39-yard pass from Bobby Hoying (Josh Jackson kick)
- MIN - Tutu Atwell 10-yard pass from Jason Murdock (Mike Chalberg kick)

Second quarter

- OSU - Bobby Hoying 9-yard run (Josh Jackson kick)
- OSU - Eddie George 11-yard run (Josh Jackson kick)
- OSU - Pepe Pearson 18-yard run (Josh Jackson kick)
- OSU - Rickey Dudley 9-yard pass from Bobby Hoying (Josh Jackson kick)

Third quarter

- OSU - Eddie George 87-yard run (Josh Jackson kick)
- OSU - Eddie George 1-yard run (Josh Jackson kick)

Fourth quarter

- MIN - Lee Hutton 54-yard pass from Jason Murdock (Mike Chalberg kick)

Top Passers

- OSU - Bobby Hoying - 16/24, 287 yards, 2 TDs
- MIN - Jason Murdock - 13/27, 174 yards, 2 TDs, 2 INTs

Top Rushers

- OSU - Eddie George - 23 rushes, 178 yards, 3 TDs
- OSU - Pepe Pearson - 12 rushes, 71 yards, 1 TD

Top Receivers

- MIN - Tutu Atwell - 8 receptions, 116 yards, 1 TD
- OSU - Terry Glenn - 3 receptions, 103 yards, 1 TD

Top Tacklers

- OSU - Rob Kelly - 8 (6 solo, 2 assists)
- MIN - Justin Conzemius - 7 (7 solo)

Interceptions

- OSU - 2 - Mike Vrabel (1), Anthony Gwinn (1)

=== Illinois ===
Illinois Fighting Illini at #2 Ohio State Buckeyes

Quarter	1	2	3	4	Total
Illinois	0	0	3	0	3
Ohio State	14	3	21	3	41

at Ohio Stadium, Columbus, Ohio

- Date: November 11
- Game time: 3:30 p.m.
- Game weather: Overcast, 37 °F (3 °C)
- Game attendance: 92,639
- Referee: Steve Pamon

Game information

First quarter

- OSU – Pepe Pearson 4-yard run (Josh Jackson kick), 8:27. Ohio St 7–0. Drive: 6 plays, 99 yards, 2:25.
- OSU – Dimitrious Stanley 14-yard pass from Bobby Hoying (Josh Jackson kick), 1:35. Ohio St 14–0. Drive: 9 plays, 61 yards, 4:51.

Second quarter

- OSU – Josh Jackson 20-yard field goal, 10:09. Ohio St 17–0. Drive: 10 plays, 57 yards, 5:20.

Third quarter

- ILL – Bret Scheuplein 42-yard field goal, 10:44. Ohio St 17–3. Drive: 10 plays, 58 yards, 4:10.
- OSU – Eddie George 64-yard run (Josh Jackson kick), 10:24. Ohio St 24–3. Drive: 1 play, 64 yards, 0:13.
- OSU – Eddie George 13-yard run (Josh Jackson kick), 3:07. Ohio St 31–3. Drive: 7 plays, 38 yards, 3:11.
- OSU – Eddie George 13-yard pass from Bobby Hoying (Josh Jackson kick), 0:58. Ohio St 38–3. Drive: 2 plays, 10 yards, 0:41.

Fourth quarter

- OSU – Josh Jackson 26-yard field goal, 8:31. Ohio St 41–3. Drive: 12 plays, 43 yards, 6:20.

Top passers

- ILL – Johnny Johnson – 11/18, 101 yards, INT
- OSU – Bobby Hoying – 8/13, 109 yards, 2 TD, INT

Top rushers

- ILL – Robert Holcombe – 14 rushes, 28 yards
- OSU – Eddie George – 36 rushes, 314 yards, 2 TD

Top receivers

- ILL – Steve Harvard – 3 receptions, 27 yards
- OSU – Rickey Dudley – 2 receptions, 53 yards

=== Indiana ===
Indiana Hoosiers at #2 Ohio State Buckeyes

Quarter	1	2	3	4	Total
Indiana	3	0	0	0	3
Ohio State	14	7	7	14	42

at Ohio Stadium, Columbus, Ohio

- Date: November 18
- Game time: 12:30 p.m.
- Game weather: Overcast, 46 °F (8 °C), Wind SW 3-10
- Game attendance: 92,352
- Referee: Dick Honig

Game information

First quarter

- OSU – Terry Glenn 12-yard pass from Bobby Hoying (Josh Jackson kick)
- IND - Bill Manolopolous 22-yard field goal
- OSU – Terry Glenn 4-yard pass from Bobby Hoying (Josh Jackson kick)

Second quarter

- OSU – Eddie George 1-yard run (Josh Jackson kick)

Third quarter

- OSU – Eddie George 1-yard run (Josh Jackson kick)

Fourth quarter

- OSU – Rickey Dudley 2-yard pass from Stanley Jackson (Josh Jackson kick)
- OSU - Pepe Pearson 8-yard run (Josh Jackson kick)

Top passers

- OSU – Bobby Hoying – 12/17, 203 yards, 2 TD, 2 INTs
- IND - Dittoe - 10/23, 103 yards, 1 INT

Top rushers

- OSU – Eddie George – 26 rushes, 130 yards, 2 TDs
- OSU - Pepe Pearson - 14 rushes, 79 yards, 1 TD

Top receivers

- OSU - Terry Glenn - 5 receptions, 103 yards, 2 TDs
- OSU – Buster Tillman – 3 receptions, 93 yards

Top tacklers

- IND - Shedley - 6 solo, 6 assists (12 total)
- IND - Dean - 7 solo, 5 assists (12 total)
- IND - Robinson - 5 solo, 7 assists (12 total)

Interceptions

- OSU - 2, Damon Moore (1), Greg Bellisari (1)
- IND - 2, Allen (1), Robinson (1)

=== Michigan ===
#2 Ohio State Buckeyes at #18 Michigan Wolverines

Quarter	1	2	3	4	Total
Ohio State	3	6	6	8	23
Michigan	7	3	7	14	31

at Michigan Stadium, Ann Arbor, Michigan

- Date: November 25, 1995
- Game time: 12:00 p.m. EST
- Game weather: Mostly Sunny, Cool, 45 °F (7 °C), Wind 15-20
- Game attendance: 106,228

Game information

First quarter

- OSU - Josh Jackson 37-yard field goal 7:29
- UM - Clarence Williams 4-yard pass from Brian Griese (Remy Hamilton kick) 5:34

Second quarter

- OSU - Josh Jackson 21-yard field goal 10:38
- UM - Remy Hamilton 37-yard field goal 5:32
- OSU - Josh Jackson 37-yard field goal 0:02

Third quarter

- UM - Brian Griese 2-yard run (Remy Hamilton kick) 10:52
- OSU - Eddie George 1-yard run (run failed) 1:14

Fourth quarter

- UM - Clarence Williams 8-yard run (Remy Hamilton kick) 13:04
- UM - Tim Biakabutuka 2-yard run (Remy Hamilton kick) 7:55
- OSU - Buster Tillman 19-yard pass from Bobby Hoying (Eddie George pass from Bobby Hoying) 6:33

Top Passers

- OSU - Bobby Hoying - 22/45, 286 yards, 1 TD, 2 INTs
- UM - Brian Griese - 9/18, 103 yards, 1 TD, 3 INTs

Top Rushers

- UM - Tim Biakabutuka - 37 rushes, 313 yards, 1 TD
- OSU - Eddie George - 21 rushes, 104 yards, 1 TD

Top Receivers

- OSU - Terry Glenn - 4 receptions, 72 yards
- OSU - Rickey Dudley - 5 receptions, 59 yards

Top Tacklers

- UM - Jarrett Irons - 11 (9 solo, 2 assists)
- OSU - Ryan Miller - 11 (7 solo, 4 assists)
- OSU - Kevin Johnson - 11 (7 solo, 4 assists)

Interceptions

- OSU - 3 - Shawn Springs (1), Rob Kelly (1), Mike Vrabel (1)
- UM -2 - Charles Woodson (2)

=== 1996 Citrus Bowl ===
#5 Ohio State Buckeyes vs #4 Tennessee Volunteers

Quarter	1	2	3	4	Total
Ohio State	7	0	0	7	14
Tennessee	0	7	7	6	20

at Citrus Bowl, Orlando, Florida

- Date: January 1, 1996
- Game time: 1:00 p.m. EST
- Game weather: Cloudy, Occasional Rain, 70 °F (21 °C), Wind SW 10-15
- Game attendance: 70,797
- Referee: Steve Useschek

== Personnel ==
=== Coaching staff ===
- John Cooper – Head coach – 8th year
- Bill Conley – Defensive ends, recruiting coordinator – 9th
- Walt Harris – Quarterbacks – 1st
- Joe Hollis – Offensive coordinator – 5th on staff (4th as OC)
- Mike Jacobs – Offensive tackles, tight ends - 1st
- Fred Pagac – Linebackers – 16th
- Lovie Smith – Defensive backs – 1st
- Tim Spencer – Running backs – 2nd
- Chuck Stobart – Wide receivers – 1st
- Bill Young – Defensive coordinator – 8th

=== Roster ===
1995 Ohio State Buckeyes football team roster
Players
Coaches
Offense

Pos.	#	Name	Class
OT	67	Brooks Burris	Fr
FB	39	Matt Calhoun	Jr
SE	1	DeWayne Carter	Sr
G	57	LeShun Daniels	Jr
FL	87	Robbie Davis	Sr
TE	80	Rickey Dudley	Sr
OL	78	Drew Elford	Fr
FB	24	Carmie Elmore	So
QB	7	Joe Germaine	So
OL	66	Dan Gibbons	Fr
WR	83	Terry Glenn	Sr
RB	27	Eddie George (C)	Sr
OT	50	Eric Gohlstin	So
G	60	Terry Harris	So
TB	16	Andre Hatcher	So
FL	97	Brian Heinen	So
LB	53	Darron Hester	So
LB	36	Terry Homa	Fr
TE	88	Bob Houser	Fr
QB	14	Bobby Hoying (C)	Sr
QB	10	Tom Hoying	So
C	61	Kevin Hyme	Jr
RB	25	Jermon Jackson	So
QB	8	Stanley Jackson	So
FL	81	Matt Jacobs	Jr
FB	44	Josh Jenkins	Jr
RB	23	Matt Keller	Fr
C	62	Jason Kozar	Fr
C	76	Dean Kreuzer	Jr
G	74	Greg Kuszmaul	Sr
TE	85	John Lumpkin	Fr
RB	33	Joe Montgomery	So
SE	15	Dee Miller	Fr
OL	56	Rob Murphy	Fr
OT	75	Orlando Pace	So
RB	29	Pepe Pearson	So
C	65	Juan Porter	Jr
WR	6	Jimmy Redmond	Fr
RB	21	Charlie Sanders	Fr
SE	98	Alonzo Shavers	Sr
OL	76	Eric Smith	Fr
WR	3	Dimitrious Stanley	Jr
FB	37	Nicky Sualua	So
G	72	Jamie Sumner	Sr
SE	12	Buster Tillman	Jr
OT	79	Larry Waldon	So
TE	84	Steve Wisniewski	Fr

Defense

Pos.	#	Name	Class
FS	9	Steve Baird	Fr
MLB	61	Matt Baker	So
OLB	16	Dave Becker	Fr
DE	95	Jim Bell	So
ILB	30	Greg Bellisari	Jr
DT	70	Matt Bonhaus (C)	Jr
FS	18	Che' Bryant	Fr
LB	63	Jason Cook	Jr
FS	5	Dan Colson	Jr
MLB	55	Will Connery	Sr
NG	62	Shane Clark	Jr
DE	97	John Day	So
LB	51	Roedell Dupree	So
DE	96	Tony Eisenhard	Fr
NG	99	Luke Fickell	Jr
DE	92	Matt Finkes	Jr
DT	68	Winfield Garnett	So
CB	42	Kevin Griffin	Fr
FS	26	Anthony Gwinn	Jr
CB	2	Ty Howard	Jr
DE	93	Rick Huntzinger	Sr
OLB	52	Kevin Johnson	Jr
SS	34	Rob Kelly	Jr
DB	17	Percy King	Fr
LB	44	Chris Kirk	Fr
SS	19	Heath Knisley	Jr
LB	48	Matt LaVrar	Fr
SS	28	Jason Louis	Sr
CB	20	Central McClellion	Fr
OLB	43	Ryan Miller	Jr
SS	13	Damon Moore	Fr
DB	19	Ahmed Plummer	Fr
DE	58	James Ross	So
OLB	35	Jerry Rudzinski	Fr
NG	98	Marcus Spriggs	Fr
CB	24	Shawn Springs	Jr
OLB	32	Obie Stillwell	Jr
DE	54	Brian Stoughton	Sr
DE	94	Mike Vrabel	Jr
OLB	46	Marc Willis	Jr
DE	91	Jeff Wilson	Fr
CB	11	Antoine Winfield	Fr

Special teams

Pos.	#	Name	Class
K	4	Josh Jackson	Jr
P	41	Brent Bartholomew	Fr
K/P	41	Patrick Doyle	Fr
K/P	38	Mike Malfatt	So

Head coach

- John Cooper

Coordinators/assistant coaches

- Joe Hollis (OC)
- Fred Pagac (DC)
- Bill Conley (DEs)
- Walt Harris (QBs)
- Jim Heacock (DL)
- Mike Jacobs (OL)
- Tim Spencer (RBs)
- Chuck Stobart (WRs)
- Jon Tenuta (DBs)
- Dustin Calhoun (GA)
- Troy Rothenbuler (GA)

Legend

- (C) Team captain
- (S) Suspended
- (I) Ineligible
- Injured
- Redshirt

=== Depth chart ===
Defense

FS
26 Anthony Gwinn
18 Che Bryant

WLB	MLB	SLB
43 Ryan Miller	30 Greg Bellisari	52 Kevin Johnson
⋅	⋅	35 Jerry Rudzinski

SS
34 Rob Kelly
13 Damon Moore

CB
2 Ty Howard
⋅

DE	DT	DT	DE
94 Mike Vrabel	99 Luke Fickell	70 Matt Bonhaus	92 Matt Finkes
⋅	62 Shane Clark	68 Winfield Garnett	⋅

CB
24 Shawn Springs
⋅

Offense

SE
12 Buster Tillman
15 Dee Miller

LT	LG	C	RG	RT
75 Orlando Pace	72 Jamie Summner	65 Juan Porter	57 LeShun Daniels	50 Eric Gohlstin
⋅	⋅	⋅	⋅	⋅

TE
80 Rickey Dudley
85 John Lumpkin

FL
83 Terry Glenn
3 Dimitrious Stanley

QB
14 Bobby Hoying
8 Stanley Jackson

Key reserves
28 Jason Louis (SS)

FB
37 Nicky Sualua
39 Matt Calhoun

Special teams
PK 4 Josh Jackson
P 41 Brent Bartholomew
KR Terry Glenn
PR Shawn Springs

RB
27 Eddie George
29 Pepe Pearson

== Awards and honors ==
- Eddie George, Heisman Trophy
- Eddie George, Walter Camp Award
- Eddie George, Doak Walker Award
- Eddie George, Maxwell Award
- Terry Glenn, Fred Biletnikoff Award
- Orlando Pace, Lombardi Award

Seven Ohio State players received first-team honors on the 1995 All-Big Ten Conference football team: Hoying (Coaches/Media); George (Coaches/Media); Glenn (Coaches/Media); Pace (Coaches/Media); tight end Rickey Dudley (Coaches/Media); defensive lineman Mike Vrabel (Coaches/Media); and defensive back Shawn Springs (Coaches/Media).

== 1996 NFL draftees ==
Player	Round	Pick	Position	NFL club
Terry Glenn	1	7	Wide receiver	New England Patriots
Rickey Dudley	1	9	Tight end	Oakland Raiders
Eddie George	1	14	Running back	Houston Oilers
Bobby Hoying	3	85	Quarterback	Philadelphia Eagles
