= 1995 Wisconsin Badgers football team =

American college football season

1995 Wisconsin Badgers football
- Conference: Big Ten Conference
- Record: 4–5–2 (3–4–1 Big Ten)
- Head coach: Barry Alvarez (6th season)
- Offensive coordinator: Brad Childress (4th season)
- Offensive scheme: Pro-style
- Defensive coordinator: Kevin Cosgrove (1st season)
- Base defense: 4–3
- MVPs: Darrell Bevell; Eric Unverzagt
- Captains: Darrell Bevell; Jason Maniecki; Pete Monty; Steve Stark; Eric Unverzagt
- Home stadium: Camp Randall Stadium

1995 Big Ten Conference football standings
| | Conf. | | | | | Overall |
| Team | W | | L | | T | W | | L | | T |
|---|---|---|---|---|---|---|---|---|---|---|
| No. 8 Northwestern $ | 8 | – | 0 | – | 0 | 10 | – | 2 | – | 0 |
| No. 6 Ohio State | 7 | – | 1 | – | 0 | 11 | – | 2 | – | 0 |
| No. 13 Penn State | 5 | – | 3 | – | 0 | 9 | – | 3 | – | 0 |
| No. 17 Michigan | 5 | – | 3 | – | 0 | 9 | – | 4 | – | 0 |
| Michigan State | 4 | – | 3 | – | 1 | 6 | – | 5 | – | 1 |
| No. 25 Iowa | 4 | – | 4 | – | 0 | 8 | – | 4 | – | 0 |
| Illinois | 3 | – | 4 | – | 1 | 5 | – | 5 | – | 1 |
| Wisconsin | 3 | – | 4 | – | 1 | 4 | – | 5 | – | 2 |
| Purdue | 2 | – | 5 | – | 1 | 4 | – | 6 | – | 1 |
| Minnesota | 1 | – | 7 | – | 0 | 3 | – | 8 | – | 0 |
| Indiana | 0 | – | 8 | – | 0 | 2 | – | 9 | – | 0 |
$ – Conference champion; Rankings from AP Poll

The 1995 Wisconsin Badgers football team was an American football team that represented the University of Wisconsin–Madison as a member of the Big Ten Conference during the 1995 NCAA Division I-A football season. In their sixth year under head coach Barry Alvarez, the Badgers compiled a 4–5–2 record (3–4–1 in conference games), tied for seventh place in the Big Ten, and were outscored by a total of 253 to 235. Against ranked opponents, they lost to No. 14 Colorado, No. 4 Ohio State, and No. 11 Northwestern, and defeated No. 6 Penn State. Wisconsin's 3–3 tie with Illinois on November 25 was the last tie in NCAA Division I Football Bowl Subdivision (FBS) history as the NCAA implemented an overtime system following the season that eliminated the possibility of a tie. The Badgers were unranked in the final AP and Coaches polls.

The team's statistical leaders included quarterback Darrell Bevell (2,273 passing yards, 65.0% completion percentage), running back Carl McCullough (1,038 rushing yards, 4.4 yards per carry), wide receiver Michael London (41 receptions for 587 yards), kicker John Hall (48 points scored, 27 of 29 extra points, 7 of 14 field goals), and linebacker Pete Monty (92 solo tackles, 137 total tackles). Bevell and linebacker Eric Unverzagt tied for the team's most valuable player award. No Badgers received first-team honors on the 1995 All-America team. Defensive lineman Tarek Saleh was the only Badger to receive first-team honors from both the coaches and media on the 1995 All-Big Ten Conference football team.

The team played its home games at Camp Randall Stadium in Madison, Wisconsin.

== Schedule ==
| Date | Time | Opponent | Rank | Site | TV | Result | Attendance |
|---|---|---|---|---|---|---|---|
| September 2 | 7:00 p.m. | No. 13 Colorado* | No. 21 | Camp Randall Stadium; Madison, WI | ABC | L 7–43 | 79,015 |
| September 16 | 5:30 p.m. | at Stanford* | | Stanford Stadium; Stanford, CA | | T 24–24 | 42,510 |
| September 23 | 1:00 p.m. | SMU* | | Camp Randall Stadium; Madison, WI | | W 42–0 | 77,108 |
| September 30 | 5:00 p.m. | at No. 6 Penn State | | Beaver Stadium; University Park, PA | ESPN | W 17–9 | 96,540 |
| October 14 | 2:30 p.m. | No. 4 Ohio State | No. 21 | Camp Randall Stadium; Madison, WI | ABC | L 16–27 | 79,507 |
| October 21 | 11:30 a.m. | at No. 11 Northwestern | No. 24 | Dyche Stadium; Evanston, IL | ESPN2 | L 0–35 | 49,256 |
| October 28 | 11:00 a.m. | Michigan State^{†} | | Camp Randall Stadium; Madison, WI | Creative | W 45–14 | 78,043 |
| November 4 | 11:00 a.m. | at Purdue | | Ross–Ade Stadium; West Lafayette, IN | Creative | L 27–38 | 39,125 |
| November 11 | 6:00 p.m. | at Minnesota | | Hubert H. Humphrey Metrodome; Minneapolis, MN (rivalry) | ESPN2 | W 34–27 | 64,016 |
| November 18 | 11:30 a.m. | Iowa | | Camp Randall Stadium; Madison, WI (rivalry) | ESPN2 | L 20–33 | 78,907 |
| November 25 | 2:30 p.m. | Illinois | | Camp Randall Stadium; Madison, WI | Creative | T 3–3 | 76,750 |
*Non-conference game; ^{†}Homecoming; Rankings from AP Poll released prior to the game; All times are in Central time

== Game summaries ==
=== Colorado ===
Colorado Buffaloes at Wisconsin Badgers

| Quarter | 1 | 2 | 3 | 4 | Total |
|---|---|---|---|---|---|
| Colorado | 3 | 23 | 10 | 7 | 43 |
| Wisconsin | 0 | 7 | 0 | 0 | 7 |

at Camp Randall Stadium, Madison, Wisconsin

- Date: September 2, 1995
- Game time: 7:00 p.m. CST
- Game attendance: 79,015
- Box Score

Game information

First quarter

- COL - FG Voskeritchian 27

Second quarter

- COL - Carruth 17 pass from Detmer (Voskeritchian kick)
- WIS - Bevell 5 run (Pauly kick)
- COL - Barnes 6 run (Voskeritchian kick)
- COL - FG Voskeritchian 28
- COL - Carruth 21 pass from Detmer (two-point conversion failed)

Third quarter

- COL - Kidd 6 pass from Detmer (Voskeritchian kick)
- COL - FG Voskeritchian 21

Fourth quarter

- COL - Rosga 75 fumble return (Voskeritchian kick)

Top Rushers

- COL - Troutman 15rushes, 76 yards
- WIS - C. McCullough 28 rushes, 151 yards

Top Passers

- COL - Detmer 17/24, 267 yards, 3 TDs
- WIS - Bevell 14/24, 175 yards, 1 INT

Top Receivers

- COL - Savoy 8-107 yards, Carruth 4-100 yards
- WIS - London 4-63 yards, Torian 3-51 yards

=== Stanford ===
Wisconsin Badgers at Stanford Cardinal

| Quarter | 1 | 2 | 3 | 4 | Total |
|---|---|---|---|---|---|
| Wisconsin | 3 | 7 | 14 | 0 | 24 |
| Stanford | 0 | 10 | 7 | 7 | 24 |

at Stanford Stadium, Stanford, California

- Date: September 16, 1995
- Game time: 5:30 p.m. CST
- Game attendance: 42,510
- Box Score

Game information
First quarter
- WIS - FG J Hall 23

Second quarter

- STAN - FG Abrams 23
- WIS - C Martin 12 pass from Bevell (J Hall kick)
- STAN - Bookman 14 pass from Butterfield (Abrams kick)

Third quarter

- WIS - C Mccullough 2 run (J Hall kick)
- STAN - Comella 1 pass from Butterfield (Abrams kick)
- WIS - Nyquist 9 pass from Bevell (J Hall kick)

Fourth quarter

- STAN - Comella 8 pass from Butterfield (Abrams kick)

=== SMU ===
SMU Mustangs at Wisconsin Badgers

| Quarter | 1 | 2 | 3 | 4 | Total |
|---|---|---|---|---|---|
| SMU | 0 | 0 | 0 | 0 | 0 |
| Wisconsin | 14 | 14 | 0 | 14 | 42 |

at Camp Randall Stadium, Madison, Wisconsin

- Date: September 23
- Game time: 7:00 p.m. CDT
- Game attendance: 77,108
- Box Score

Game information

First quarter

- WIS – Aaron Stecker 1-yard run (John Hall kick), 5:46. Badgers 7–0.
- WIS – Carl McCullough 19-yard run (John Hall kick), 1:02. Badgers 14–0.

Second quarter

- WIS – Tony Simmons 28-yard pass from Darrell Bevell (John Hall kick), 7:45. Badgers 21–0.
- WIS – Michael London 30-yard pass from Darrell Bevell (John Hall kick), 1:28. Badgers 28–0.

Third quarter

- No scoring plays

Fourth quarter

- WIS – Tony Simmons 5-yard pass from Darrell Bevell (Dana Nielsen kick), 11:37. Badgers 35–0.
- WIS – Aaron Stecker 23-yard run (John Hall kick), 6:35. Badgers 42–0.

Top passers

- SMU – Mark Humble – 12/25, 127 yards, INT
- WIS – Darrell Bevell – 18/20, 223 yards, 3 TD

Top rushers

- SMU – Donte Womack – 14 rushes, 54 yards
- WIS – Carl McCullough – 26 rushes, 130 yards, TD

Top receivers

- SMU – Albert Johnson – 7 receptions, 40 yards
- WIS – Michael London – 4 receptions, 69 yards, TD

=== Penn State ===
Wisconsin Badgers at Penn State Nittany Lions

| Quarter | 1 | 2 | 3 | 4 | Total |
|---|---|---|---|---|---|
| Wisconsin | 10 | 0 | 0 | 7 | 17 |
| Penn State | 0 | 0 | 3 | 6 | 9 |

at Beaver Stadium, State College, Pennsylvania

- Date: September 30, 1995
- Game time: 4:00 p.m. CST
- Game attendance: 96,540
- Box Score

Game information
First quarter
- WIS - FG J Hall 26
- WIS - Nyquist 21 pass from Bevell (J Hall kick)

Second quarter

Third quarter

- PSU - FG Conway 32

Fourth quarter

- WIS - T Simmons 21 pass from Bevell (J Hall kick)
- PSU - Scott 5 pass from Richardson (two-point conversion failed)

=== Ohio State ===
#4 Ohio State Buckeyes at #21 Wisconsin Badgers

| Quarter | 1 | 2 | 3 | 4 | Total |
|---|---|---|---|---|---|
| Ohio State | 0 | 7 | 6 | 14 | 27 |
| Wisconsin | 3 | 6 | 7 | 0 | 16 |

at Camp Randall Stadium, Madison, Wisconsin

- Date: October 14, 1995
- Game time: 2:30 p.m. CST
- Game weather: Cloudy, 45 °F (7 °C); Wind NW 20
- Game attendance: 79,507
- Referee: Tom Quinn
- Box Score

Game information

First quarter

- WIS - John Hall 45-yard field goal

Second quarter

- OSU - Eddie George 1-yard run (Josh Jackson kick)
- WIS - Cecil Martin 4-yard pass from Darrell Bevell (kick failed)

Third quarter

- OSU - Terry Glenn 2-yard pass from Bobby Hoying (pass failed)
- WIS - Carl McCullough 14-yard run (John Hall kick)

Fourth quarter

- OSU - Eddie George 1-yard run (Josh Jackson kick)
- OSU - Eddie George 51-yard run (Josh Jackson kick)

Top Passers

- OSU - Bobby Hoying - 18/26, 206 yards, 1 TD, 1 INT
- WIS - Darrell Bevell - 15/31, 158 yards, 1 TD, 2 INTs

Top Rushers

- OSU - Eddie George - 26 rushes, 141 yards, 3 TDs
- WIS - Carl McCullough - 23 rushes, 102 yards

Top Receivers

- OSU - Buster Tillman - 6 receptions, 91 yards
- WIS - Michael London - 3 receptions, 62 yards

Top Tacklers

- WIS - Cyrill Weems - 10 (5 solo, 5 assisted)
- WIS - Pete Monty - 10 (4 solo, 6 assisted)

Interceptions

- OSU - 2 - Greg Bellisari (1), Anthony Gwinn (1)
- WIS - 1 - Kevin Huntley

=== Northwestern ===
Wisconsin Badgers at Northwestern Wildcats

| Quarter | 1 | 2 | 3 | 4 | Total |
|---|---|---|---|---|---|
| Wisconsin | 0 | 0 | 0 | 0 | 0 |
| Northwestern | 10 | 3 | 6 | 16 | 35 |

at Dyche Stadium, Evanston, Illinois

- Date: October 21, 1995
- Game time: 11:30 a.m. CST
- Game attendance: 49,256
- TV: ESPN2

Game information
First quarter
- NU - Steve Schnur 1-yard run (Valenzisi kick)

Second quarter

- NU - Sam Valenzisi 32-yard field goal
- NU - Sam Valenzisi 26-yard field goal

Third quarter

- NU - Darnell Autry 32-yard pass from Steve Schnur (conversion failed)

Fourth quarter

- NU - Darnell Autry 3-yard run (Valenzisi kick)
- NU - Brian Gowins 40-yard field goal
- NU - Levelle Brown 38-yard run (PAT failed)

=== Michigan State ===
Michigan State Spartans at Wisconsin Badgers

| Quarter | 1 | 2 | 3 | 4 | Total |
|---|---|---|---|---|---|
| Michigan State | 7 | 0 | 0 | 7 | 14 |
| Wisconsin | 7 | 17 | 14 | 7 | 45 |

at Camp Randall Stadium, Madison, Wisconsin

- Date: October 28, 1995
- Game time: 11:30 a.m. CST
- Game attendance: 78,447
- Box Score

Game information

First quarter

- WIS - C. Martin 5-yard run (J. Hall kick)
- MSU - S. Greene 2-yard run (C. Gardner kick)

Second quarter

- WIS - J. Hall 43-yard FG
- WIS - C. Martin 5-yard run (J. Hall kick)
- WIS - Nyquist 7-yard pass from Bevell (J. Hall kick)

Third quarter

- WIS - T. Simmons 1-yard pass from Bevell (J. Hall kick)
- WIS - Nyquist 2-yard pass from Bevell (J. Hall kick)

Fourth quarter

- MSU - Mason 31-yard pass from Banks (C. Gardner kick)
- WIS - Waerig 12-yard run (J. Hall kick)

Top Rushers

- MSU - Crenshaw 5 rushes, 41 yards
- WIS - C. McCullough 19 rushes, 91 yards

Top Passers

- MSU - Banks 17/30, 207 yards, 3 INTs
- WIS - Bevell 17/27, 265 yards

Top Receivers

- MSU - Muhammad 6 receptions, 83 yards
- WIS - T Simmons 5 receptions, 70 yards

=== Purdue ===
Wisconsin Badgers at Purdue Boilermakers

| Quarter | 1 | 2 | 3 | 4 | Total |
|---|---|---|---|---|---|
| Wisconsin | 7 | 7 | 7 | 6 | 27 |
| Purdue | 14 | 6 | 8 | 10 | 38 |

at Ross-Ade Stadium, West Lafayette, Indiana

- Date: November 4, 1995
- Game time: 11:00 a.m. CST
- Game attendance: 39,125
- Box Score

Game information
First quarter
- PUR - Alford 64-yard pass from Tretzger (Bobich kick)
- WIS - Weems 75-yard interception return (Hall kick)
- PUR - Watson 63-yard run (Bobich kick)

Second quarter

- PUR - Alstott 40-yard run (kick failed)
- WIS - Simmons 31-yard pass from Samuel (Hall kick)

Third quarter

- WIS - Stecker 7-yard run (Hall kick)
- PUR - Watson 2-yard run (Blackman pass from Tretzger)

Fourth quarter

- PUR - Bobich 20-yard field goal
- WIS - Hayes 54-yard pass from Samuel (run failed)
- PUR - Alstott 2-yard run (Bobich kick)

=== Minnesota ===
Wisconsin Badgers at Minnesota Golden Gophers

| Quarter | 1 | 2 | 3 | 4 | Total |
|---|---|---|---|---|---|
| Wisconsin | 7 | 6 | 21 | 0 | 34 |
| Minnesota | 3 | 7 | 10 | 7 | 27 |

at Hubert H. Humphrey Metrodome, Minneapolis, Minnesota

- Date: November 11, 1995
- Game time: 6:00 p.m. CST
- Game weather: None (played indoors)
- Game attendance: 64,016
- Box Score

Game information
First quarter
- WIS - T Simmons 62 pass from Bevell (J Hall kick)
- MIN - FG Chalberg 30

Second quarter

- MIN - Atwell 51 pass from Sauter (Chalberg kick)
- WIS - FG J Hall 28
- WIS - FG J Hall 60

Third quarter

- MIN - Hubbard 63 pass from Sauter (Chalberg kick)
- WIS - A Stecker 100 kickoff return (J Hall kick)
- WIS - A Stecker 3 run (J Hall kick)
- MIN - FG Chalberg 26
- WIS - T Simmons 70 pass from Bevell (J Hall kick)

Fourth quarter

- MIN - Levine 39 pass from Sauter (Chalberg kick)

=== Iowa ===
Iowa Hawkeyes at Wisconsin Badgers

| Quarter | 1 | 2 | 3 | 4 | Total |
|---|---|---|---|---|---|
| Iowa | 7 | 17 | 0 | 9 | 33 |
| Wisconsin | 0 | 7 | 7 | 6 | 20 |

at Camp Randall Stadium, Madison, Wisconsin

- Date: November 18, 1995
- Game time: 11:30 a.m. CST
- Game attendance: 78,907
- TV: ESPN2

Game information
First quarter
- IOWA - Michael Burger 3-yard pass from Matt Sherman (Bromert kick)

Second quarter

- IOWA - Sedrick Shaw 7-yard run (Bromert kick)
- IOWA - Sedrick Shaw 1-yard run (Bromert kick)
- WIS - London 45-yard pass from Darrell Bevell (Hall kick)
- IOWA - Brion Hurley 50-yard field goal

Third quarter

- WIS - Nyquist 1-yard pass from Bevell (Hall kick)

Fourth quarter

- WIS - Stecker 2-yard run (kick failed)
- IOWA - Safety, holding in end zone
- IOWA - Sedrick Shaw 4-yard run (Bromert kick)

=== Illinois ===
Illinois Fighting Illini at Wisconsin Badgers

| Quarter | 1 | 2 | 3 | 4 | Total |
|---|---|---|---|---|---|
| Illinois | 0 | 0 | 0 | 3 | 3 |
| Wisconsin | 0 | 0 | 3 | 0 | 3 |

at Camp Randall Stadium, Madison, Wisconsin

- Date: November 25, 1995
- Game time: 2:30 p.m. CST
- Game attendance: 76,750
- Box Score

Game information

Third quarter

- WIS - John Hall 29-yard field goal

Fourth quarter

- ILL - Scheuplein 51-yard field goal

Top passers

- ILL – Johnny Johnson – 17/34, 189 yards, 2 INT
- WIS – Darrell Bevell – 19/31, 184 yards

Top rushers

- ILL – Robert Holcombe – 19 rushes, 77 yards
- WIS – Carl McCullough – 35 rushes, 132 yards

Top receivers

- ILL – Shane Fisher – 4 receptions, 53 yards
- WIS – Donald Hayes – 6 receptions, 131 yards

== Roster ==
1995 Wisconsin Badgers football team roster
Players
Coaches
Offense

| Pos. | # | Name | Class |
|---|---|---|---|
| OL, LS | 54 | Dave Anderson | Sr |
| WR | 85 | Steve Baffico | Sr |
| QB | 11 | Darrell Bevell (C) | Sr |
| WR | 3 | Michael Brin | Sr |
| FB | 32 | Branden Cantrell | So |
| OT | 68 | Cayetano Castro | Jr |
| G | 64 | James Darby | Jr |
| G | 69 | Derek Engler | Jr |
| OL | 59 | Mike Galletti | Jr |
| C | 62 | Al Gay | Jr |
| OT | 79 | Aaron Gibson | Fr |
| WR | 84 | Donald Hayes | So |
| WR | 4 | Michael London | Sr |
| TE | 9 | Kevin Lyles | Jr |
| FB | 37 | Cecil Martin | Fr |
| RB | 13 | Carl McCullough | So |
| OT | 75 | Chris McIntosh | Fr |
| WR | 1 | Ahmad Merritt | Fr |
| RB | 26 | Robert Nelson | Sr |
| TE | 31 | Matt Nyquist | Sr |
| C | 56 | Mike Rader | Jr |
| RB | 44 | Royce Roberson | So |
| QB | 10 | Mike Samuel | Fr |
| WR | 82 | Tony Simmons | So |
| TE | 49 | Ryan Sondrup | Fr |
| G | 60 | Steve Stark (C) | Sr |
| RB | 43 | Aaron Stecker | Fr |
| WR | 24 | Reggie Torian | So |
| G | 65 | Jamie Vanderveldt | Jr |
| FB | 41 | John Waerig | Fr |
| OT | 71 | Jerry Wunsch | Jr |

Defense

| Pos. | # | Name | Class |
|---|---|---|---|
| S | 13 | Bob Adamov | Fr |
| DB | 45 | Giscard Bernard | Jr |
| DB | 21 | Bryn Boggs | Fr |
| DE | 74 | Tom Burke | Fr |
| CB | 38 | Lamar Campbell | So |
| LB | 19 | Daryl Carter | Jr |
| DE | 36 | Azree Commander | Jr |
| LB | 39 | Pete Diatelevi | Jr |
| LB | 50 | Donny Eicher | Fr |
| LB | 55 | Brian Flanigan | So |
| S | 27 | Damon Glenn | So |
| DB | 33 | Troy Hegg | Sr |
| S | 6 | Kevin Huntley | So |
| DE | 85 | Bryan Jurewicz | Jr |
| DB | 4 | Greg Keigher | Sr |
| LB | 57 | David Lysek | So |
| DT | 70 | Jason Maniecki (C) | Sr |
| DT | 94 | Neil Miklusak | Jr |
| LB | 48 | Pete Monty (C) | Jr |
| DB | 32 | Erik Pollex | Sr |
| DE | 42 | Tarek Saleh | Jr |
| LB | 56 | Dan Schneck | Sr |
| DT | 90 | Haywood Simmons | Sr |
| DT | 91 | Rod Spiller | Jr |
| CB | 28 | Jason Suttle | So |
| S | 34 | Leonard Taylor | Fr |
| LB | 47 | Eric Unverzagt (C) | Sr |
| CB | 7 | Cyrill Weems | Jr |
| DE | 55 | Chad Yocum | Sr |
| LB | 15 | Scott Young | Sr |

Special teams

| Pos. | # | Name | Class |
|---|---|---|---|
| P | 98 | Brian Alexander | Jr |
| OL, LS | 54 | Dave Anderson | Sr |
| K | 14 | John Hall | Jr |

Head coach

- Barry Alvarez

Coordinators/assistant coaches

- Brad Childress – Offensive Coordinator/Quarterbacks
- Kevin Cosgrove – Defensive Coordinator/Inside Linebackers
- Mike Cassity – Defensive Backs
- Jay Hayes – Outside Linebackers/Strong Safeties/Special Teams
- Jim Hueber – Offensive Line
- Henry Mason – Wide Receivers
- John Palermo – Assistant Head Coach/Defensive Line
- Brian White – Running Backs
- Bernie Wyatt – Tight Ends/Recruiting Coordinator

Legend

- (C) Team captain
- (S) Suspended
- (I) Ineligible
- Injured
- Redshirt

== Wisconsin players selected in the 1996 NFL draft ==
| Player | Position | Round | Overall Selection | NFL team |
|---|---|---|---|---|
| Eric Unverzagt | Linebacker | 4 | 131 | Seattle Seahawks |
| Jason Maniecki | Defensive tackle | 5 | 140 | Tampa Bay Buccaneers |
