= 1995 Purdue Boilermakers football team =

American college football season

1995 Purdue Boilermakers football
- Conference: Big Ten Conference
- Record: 4–6–1 (2–5–1 Big Ten)
- Head coach: Jim Colletto (5th season)
- Offensive coordinator: Tim Salem (1st season)
- Defensive coordinator: Bob Morris (2nd season)
- Base defense: 4–3
- MVP: Mike Alstott
- Captains: Mike Alstott; Aaron Hall; Jon Krick; Chris Sedoris
- Home stadium: Ross–Ade Stadium

1995 Big Ten Conference football standings
	Conf.					Overall
Team	W		L		T	W		L		T
No. 8 Northwestern $	8	–	0	–	0	10	–	2	–	0
No. 6 Ohio State	7	–	1	–	0	11	–	2	–	0
No. 13 Penn State	5	–	3	–	0	9	–	3	–	0
No. 17 Michigan	5	–	3	–	0	9	–	4	–	0
Michigan State	4	–	3	–	1	6	–	5	–	1
No. 25 Iowa	4	–	4	–	0	8	–	4	–	0
Illinois	3	–	4	–	1	5	–	5	–	1
Wisconsin	3	–	4	–	1	4	–	5	–	2
Purdue	2	–	5	–	1	4	–	6	–	1
Minnesota	1	–	7	–	0	3	–	8	–	0
Indiana	0	–	8	–	0	2	–	9	–	0
$ – Conference champion; Rankings from AP Poll

The 1995 Purdue Boilermakers football team represented Purdue University as a member of the Big Ten Conference during the 1995 NCAA Division I-A football season. Led by fifth-year head coach Jim Colletto, the Boilermakers compiled an overall record of 4–6–1 with a mark of 2–5–1 in conference play, placing ninth in the Big Ten. Purdue played home games at Ross–Ade Stadium in West Lafayette, Indiana.

== Schedule ==
Date	Time	Opponent	Site	TV	Result	Attendance
September 2	11:00 am	at No. 23 West Virginia*	Mountaineer Field; Morgantown, WV	SCA	W 26–24	60,876
September 9	2:30 pm	No. 25 Notre Dame*	Ross–Ade Stadium; West Lafayette, IN (rivalry)	ABC	L 28–35	68,876
September 23	2:30 pm	Michigan State	Ross–Ade Stadium; West Lafayette, IN	ABC	T 35–35	41,655
September 30	1:00 pm	Ball State*	Ross–Ade Stadium; West Lafayette, IN		W 35–13	49,314
October 7	6:00 pm	at Minnesota	Hubert H. Humphrey Metrodome; Minneapolis, MN		L 38–39	39,343
October 14	11:30 am	No. 20 Penn State^{†}	Ross–Ade Stadium; West Lafayette, IN	ESPN	L 23–26	58,254
October 21	11:30 am	at No. 4 Ohio State	Ohio Stadium; Columbus, OH	ESPN	L 0–28	90,111
November 4	12:00 pm	Wisconsin	Ross–Ade Stadium; West Lafayette, IN	Creative	W 38–27	37,542
November 11	12:00 pm	at No. 13 Michigan	Michigan Stadium; Ann Arbor, MI	ESPN	L 0–5	103,721
November 18	3:30 pm	No. 5 Northwestern	Ross–Ade Stadium; West Lafayette, IN	ABC	L 8–23	46,254
November 24	11:00 am	at Indiana	Memorial Stadium; Bloomington, IN (Old Oaken Bucket)	Creative	W 51–14	34,029
*Non-conference game; ^{†}Homecoming; Rankings from AP Poll released prior to the game; All times are in Eastern time

== Game summaries ==
=== West Virginia ===
Purdue Boilermakers at West Virginia Mountaineers

Quarter	1	2	3	4	Total
Purdue	10	9	0	7	26
West Virginia	0	0	14	10	24

at Mountaineer Field, Morgantown, West Virginia

- Date: September 2, 1995
- Game attendance: 60,876
- Box Score

Game information

First quarter

- PUR - Bobich 37 yard field goal
- PUR - Alford 18 yard pass from Trefzger (Bobich kick)

Second quarter

- PUR - Bobich 24 yard field goal
- PUR - Rogers 17 yard run (two-point conversion failed)

Third quarter

- WVU - Walker 4 yard run (Baumann kick)
- WVU - Walker 8 yard run (Baumann kick)

Fourth quarter

- WVU - Baumann 43 yard field goal
- PUR - Rogers 1 yard run (Bobich kick)
- WVU - Walker 8 yard run (Baumann kick)
- Mike Alstott 17 Rush, 109 Yds
- (West Virginia kicker Bryan Baumann missed the potential game-winning 26-yard field goal with 22 seconds left.)

=== Notre Dame ===
Notre Dame Fighting Irish at Purdue Boilermakers

Quarter	1	2	3	4	Total
Notre Dame	0	14	14	7	35
Purdue	7	3	3	15	28

at Ross-Ade Stadium, West Lafayette, Indiana

- Date: September 9, 1995
- Game time: 2:30 p.m. EST
- Game attendance: 70,569
- Box Score

Game information

First quarter

- PUR - Rogers 42 yard run (Bobich kick)

Second quarter

- ND - Kinder 30 yard pass from Powlus (Kopka kick)
- ND - Mayes 12 yard pass from Powlus (Kopka kick)
- PUR - Bobich 25 yard field goal

Third quarter

- ND - Sollman 15 yard pass from Powlus (Kopka kick)
- PUR - Bobich 21 yard field goal
- ND - Mosley 51 yard pass from Powlus (Kopka kick)

Fourth quarter

- PUR - Watson 13 yard run (Bobich kick)
- PUR - D Brown 54 yard interception return (Rogers reception for two-point conversion)
- ND - Kinder 52 yard run (Kopka kick)

Top Rushers

- ND - Kinder - 14 rushes, 142 yards
- PUR - Mike Alstott - 21 rushes, 115 yards

Top Passers

- ND - Ron Powlus - 17/25, 252 yards, 4 TDs, 2 INTs
- PUR - Rick Trefzger - 15/27, 181 yards, 2 INTs

Top Receivers

- ND - Mayes - 7 receptions, 85 yards, 1 TD
- PUR - Alford- 7 receptions, 91 yards

=== Michigan State ===
Michigan State Spartans at Purdue Boilermakers

Quarter	1	2	3	4	Total
Michigan State	14	6	8	7	35
Purdue	7	14	0	14	35

at Ross-Ade Stadium, West Lafayette, Indiana

- Date: September 23, 1995
- Game time: 2:30 p.m. EST
- Game attendance: 43,070
- Box Score

Game information

First quarter

- MSU - Mason 43 pass from Banks (C Gardner kick)
- PUR - Alford 29 pass from Reeves (Bobich kick)
- MSU - S Greene 21 run (C Gardner kick)

Second quarter

- PUR - Alford 69 pass from Alstott (Bobich kick)
- PUR - Alstott 6 run (Bobich kick)
- MSU - Mason 7 pass from Banks (kick failed)

Third quarter

- MSU - S Greene 3 run (Banks run for two-point conversion)

Fourth quarter

- PUR - Rogers 1 run (Bobich kick)
- MSU - S Greene 70 run (C Gardner kick)
- PUR - Rogers 4 run (Bobich kick)

Top Rushers

- MSU - S Greene 17 rushes, 161 yards, 3 TDs
- PUR - Alstott 20 rushes, 136 yards, 1 TD

Top Passers

- MSU - Banks 16/25, 208 yards, 1 INT
- PUR - Alstott 1/1, 69 yards, 1 TD
- PUR - Trefzger 9/15, 110 yards
- PUR - Reeves 9/16, 122 yards, 1 TD, 2 INTs

Top Receivers

- MSU - Mason 7 receptions, 150 yards, 2 TDs
- PUR - Olivadotti 5 receptions, 73 yards
- PUR - Alford 4 receptions, 113 yards, 2 TDs

=== Ball State ===
Ball State Cardinals at Purdue Boilermakers

Quarter	1	2	3	4	Total
Ball State	3	3	0	7	13
Purdue	7	14	7	7	35

at Ross-Ade Stadium, West Lafayette, Indiana

- Date: September 30, 1995
- Game time: 1:00 p.m. EST
- Game attendance: 50,733
- Box Score

Game information

First quarter

- PUR - Rogers 5 run (Bobich kick)
- BALL - FG Lockliear 39

Second quarter

- PUR - Winston 23 interception return (Bobich kick)
- BALL - FG Lockliear 39
- PUR - L Johnson 99 kickoff return (Bobich kick)

Third quarter

- PUR - Alstott 2 run (Bobich kick)

Fourth quarter

- PUR - Alford 14 pass from Trefzger (Bobich kick)
- BALL - Abernathy 13 pass from Knisely (Lockliear kick)

Top Passers

- BALL - Baldwin - 16/27, 106 yards, 1 INT
- PUR - Rick Trefzger - 5/9, 65 yards, 1 TD

Top Rushers

- BALL - Moore - 11 rushes, 78 yards
- PUR - Mike Alstott - 22 rushes, 127 yards, 1 TD

Top Receivers

- BALL - Abernathy 8 receptions, 69 yards, 1 TD
- PUR - Alford - 3 receptions, 57 yards, 1 TD

=== Minnesota ===
Purdue Boilermakers at Minnesota Golden Gophers

Quarter	1	2	3	4	Total
Purdue	7	10	14	7	38
Minnesota	7	0	17	15	39

at Hubert H. Humphrey Metrodome, Minneapolis, Minnesota

- Date: October 7, 1995
- Game time: 6:00 p.m. CST
- Game weather: Cool, 72 °F (22 °C), No Wind (indoors)
- Game attendance: 39,343
- Box Score

Game information

First quarter

- PUR - Alstott 11 run (Bobich kick)
- MIN - Sauter 1 run (Chalberg kick)

Second quarter

- PUR - Bobich 19 FG
- PUR - Alstott 1 run (Bobich kick)

Third quarter

- MIN - Darkins 7 run (Chalberg kick)
- PUR - Alstott 3 run (Bobich kick)
- MIN - Darkins 45 run (Chalberg kick)
- MIN - Chalberg 48 FG
- PUR - Alford 78 pass from Trefzger (Bobich kick)

Fourth quarter

- MIN - Darkins 24 run (Chalberg kick)
- PUR - Trefzger 4 run (Bobich kick)
- MIN - Sauter 1 run (Thelwell pass from Sauter)

Top Passers

- PUR - Rick Trefzger - 13/24, 264 yards, 1 TD
- MIN - Cory Sauter - 15/26, 142 yards, 1 INT

Top Rushers

- MIN - Chris Darkins - 38 rushes, 294 yards, 3 TDs
- PUR - *Mike Alstott 28 rushes, 133 yards, 3 TDs

Top Receivers

- PUR - Brian Alford - 6 receptions, 172 yards, 1 TD
- MIN - Ryan Thelwell - 6 receptions, 55 yards

=== Penn State ===
Penn State Nittany Lions at Purdue Boilermakers

Quarter	1	2	3	4	Total
Penn State	0	10	6	10	26
Purdue	6	7	0	10	23

at Ross-Ade Stadium, West Lafayette, Indiana

- Date: October 14, 1995
- Game time: 12:30 p.m.
- Game attendance: 60,455
- Box Score

Game information

First quarter

- PUR - Bobich 37-yard field goal
- PUR - Bobich 21-yard field goal

Second quarter

- PSU - Engram 48-yard pass from Richardson (Conway kick)
- PSU - Conway 35-yard field goal
- PUR - Alstott 18-yard run (Bobich kick)

Third quarter

- PSU - Conway 42-yard field goal
- PSU - Conway 33-yard field goal

Fourth quarter

- PUR - Bobich 22-yard field goal
- PUR - Rogers 4-yard run (Bobich kick)
- PSU - Conway 25-yard field goal
- PSU - Archie 16-yard pass from Richardson (Conway kick)

Top Rushers

- PSU - Curtis Enis - 18 rushes, 85 yards
- PUR - Mike Alstott - 24 rushes, 149 yards, 1 TD

=== Ohio State ===
Purdue Boilermakers at Ohio State Buckeyes

Quarter	1	2	3	4	Total
Purdue	0	0	0	0	0
Ohio State	7	7	14	0	28

at Ohio Stadium, Columbus, Ohio

- Date: October 21, 1995
- Game time: 12:30 p.m.
- Game weather: Overcast, Some Rain 40 °F (4 °C), Wind S 10-15
- Game attendance: 93,111
- Referee: Dick Honig
- Box Score

Game information

First quarter

- OSU - Eddie George 1-yard run (Josh Jackson kick)

Second quarter

- OSU - Rickey Dudley 30-yard pass from Bobby Hoying (Josh Jackson kick)

Third quarter

- OSU - Terry Glenn 7-yard pass from Bobby Hoying (Josh Jackson kick)
- OSU - Terry Glenn 12-yard pass from Bobby Hoying (Josh Jackson kick)

Fourth quarter

- No scoring

Top Passers

- OSU - Bobby Hoying - 20/29, 276 yards, 3 TDs, 1 INT
- PUR - John Reeves - 7/17, 67 yards, 2 INTs

Top Rushers

- PUR - Mike Alstott - 26 rushes, 109 yards
- OSU - Eddie George - 23 rushes, 104 yards, 1 TD

Top Receivers

- OSU - Buster Tillman - 6 receptions, 96 yards
- OSU - Terry Glenn - 6 receptions, 82 yards, 2 TDs

Top Tacklers

- OSU - Antoine Winfield - 11 (9 solo, 2 assisted)
- OSU - Ryan Miller - 8 (2 solo, 6 assisted)
- PUR - Bob O'Connor - 8 (5 solo, 3 assisted)

Interceptions

- OSU - 2 - Ty Howard (1), Ryan Miller (1)
- PUR - 1 - Derrick Winston

Fumbles Recovered

- PUR - 1 - Derrick Brown

=== Wisconsin ===
Wisconsin Badgers at Purdue Boilermakers

Quarter	1	2	3	4	Total
Wisconsin	7	7	7	6	27
Purdue	14	6	8	10	38

at Ross-Ade Stadium, West Lafayette, Indiana

- Date: November 4, 1995
- Game time: 11:00 a.m. CST
- Game attendance: 39,125
- Box Score

Game information

First quarter

- PUR - Alford 64-yard pass from Tretzger (Bobich kick)
- WIS - Weems 75-yard interception return (Hall kick)
- PUR - Watson 63-yard run (Bobich kick)

Second quarter

- PUR - Alstott 40-yard run (kick failed)
- WIS - Simmons 31-yard pass from Samuel (Hall kick)

Third quarter

- WIS - Stecker 7-yard run (Hall kick)
- PUR - Watson 2-yard run (Blackman pass from Tretzger)

Fourth quarter

- PUR - Bobich 20-yard field goal
- WIS - Hayes 54-yard pass from Samuel (run failed)
- PUR - Alstott 2-yard run (Bobich kick)

Top Passers

- WIS - Samuel - 6/15, 122 yards
- PUR - Tretzger - 15/22, 201 yards, 1 TD, 2 INTs

Top Rushers

- PUR - Mike Alstott - 36 rushes, 204 yards, 2 TDs
- PUR - Edwin Watson 21 rushes, 194 yards, 2 TDs

Top Receivers

- PUR - Alford - 4 receptions, 87 yards, 1 TD
- WIS - T. Simmons - 3 receptions, 52 yards, 1 TD

=== Michigan ===
Purdue Boilermakers at Michigan Wolverines

Quarter	1	2	3	4	Total
Purdue	0	0	0	0	0
Michigan	3	0	0	2	5

at Michigan Stadium, Ann Arbor, Michigan

- Date: November 11, 1995
- Game time: 12:00 p.m. EST
- Game attendance: 103,721
- Box Score

Game information

First quarter

- MICH - Remy Hamilton 25-yard field goal

Second quarter

Third quarter

Fourth quarter

- MICH - Safety, Rick Trefzger tackled by Clarence Thompson

Top Rushers

- PUR - Watson - 9 rushes, 31 yards
- MICH - Tim Biakabutuka - 14 rushes, 84 yards

Top Passers

- PUR - Rick Trefzger - 11/19, 84 yards, 1 INT
- MICH - Brian Griese - 11/24, 101 yards, 1 INT

Top Receivers

- PUR - Olivadotti 4 receptions, 27 yards
- PUR - Alford 2 receptions, 240 yards
- MICH - Mercury Hayes - 4 receptions, 42 yards
- MICH - Amani Toomer - 3 receptions, 25 yards

=== Northwestern ===
Northwestern Wildcats at Purdue Boilermakers

Quarter	1	2	3	4	Total
Northwestern	7	7	9	0	23
Purdue	0	0	0	8	8

at Ross-Ade Stadium, West Lafayette, Indiana

- Date: November 18, 1995
- Game time: 3:30 p.m.
- Game attendance: 47,172
- Box Score

Game information

First quarter

- NU - Chris Martin 76-yard interception return (Gowins kick)

Second quarter

- NU - D'Wayne Bates 72-yard pass from Steve Schnur (Gowins kick)

Third quarter

- NU - Safety
- NU - Steve Schnur 1-yard run (Gowins kick)

Fourth quarter

- PUR - Watson 3-yard run (Alstott reception)
- PUR: Mike Alstott - 25 rushes, 264 yards, 2-pt. conversion catch

=== Indiana ===
Purdue Boilermakers at Indiana Hoosiers

Quarter	1	2	3	4	Total
Purdue	10	14	21	6	51
Indiana	7	7	14	0	28

at Memorial Stadium, Bloomington, Indiana

- Date: November 24, 1995
- Game time: 11:00 a.m.
- Game attendance: 34,029
- Box Score

Game information

First quarter

- PUR - Alstott 1-yard run (Bobich kick)
- PUR - Bobich 26-yard field goal

Second quarter

- PUR - Alford 7-yard pass from Trefzger (Bobich kick)
- PUR - Alford 10-yard pass from Trefzger (Bobich kick)
- IND - Greenlee 3-yard run (Horn kick)

Third quarter

- PUR - Rogers 2-yard run (Bobich kick)
- IND - Smith 6-yard run (Horn kick)
- PUR - Alstott 1-yard run (Bobich kick)
- PUR - Alstott 62-yard run (Bobich kick)

Fourth quarter

- PUR - Watson 3-yard run (kick failed)

Top Rushers

- PUR - Mike Alstott - 25 rushes, 264 yards, 3 TDs
- IND - Smith - 17 rushes, 64 yards, 1 TD

Top Passers

- PUR - Rick Trefzger - 10/16, 161 yards, 2 TDs
- IND - Greenlee - 17/32, 154 yards

Top Receivers

- PUR - Allen - 5 receptions, 99 yards
- IND - Stoner - 6 receptions, 50 yards

== Roster ==
1995 Purdue Boilermakers football team roster
Players
Coaches
Offense

Pos.	#	Name	Class
WR	80	Brian Alford	So
WR		Craig Allen
FB	40	Mike Alstott (C)	Sr
TE		Jon Blackman
QB		Billy Dicken
OL		Mark Fischer
RB		Eric Haddad
OL		Alfie Hill
OL		John Hoogendoorn
RB		Lee Johnson
WR		Isaac Jones
OL		Damon Lewis
OL		Dan Maly
RB		Kendall Matthews
OL		Brian Nicley
WR		Kirk Olivadotti
QB		John Reeves
RB		Cory Rogers
OL		Chris Sedoris
TE		Charlie Stephens
WR		Willie Tillman	So
QB		Rick Trefzger
RB		Edwin Watson
OL		Emmett Zitelli

Defense

Pos.	#	Name	Class
DB		Derrick Brown
DB		Lee Brush
DB		Willie Burroughs
DB		Jamal Coleman
DL		Rosevelt Colvin
LB		Willie Fells
LB		Joe Hagins
LB		Aaron Hall
DL		Darnell Howard
LB		Noble Jones
DL		Jon Krick
DL		Chukie Nwokorie
LB		Bob O'Connor
LB		Chike Okeafor
DL		Leo Perez
DB		Tommy Triplett
DL		Jayme Washel
DL		Craig Williams
DB		Derrick Winston

Special teams

Pos.	#	Name	Class
K		Brad Bobich
P		Rob Deignan

Head coach

- Jim Colletto

Coordinators/assistant coaches

- Tim Salem
  (Offensive coordinator)
- Chester Caddas
- Randy Fichtner
  (Wide receivers)

Legend

- (C) Team captain
- (S) Suspended
- (I) Ineligible
- Injured
- Redshirt
