= 1995 Illinois Fighting Illini football team =

American college football season

1995 Illinois Fighting Illini football
- Conference: Big Ten Conference
- Record: 5–5–1 (3–4–1 Big Ten)
- Head coach: Lou Tepper (4th season)
- Offensive coordinator: Paul Schudel (1st season)
- Defensive coordinator: Denny Marcin (4th season)
- MVP: Kevin Hardy
- Captains: Jason Dulick; Kevin Hardy; Brett Larsen
- Home stadium: Memorial Stadium

1995 Big Ten Conference football standings
| | Conf. | | | | | Overall |
| Team | W | | L | | T | W | | L | | T |
|---|---|---|---|---|---|---|---|---|---|---|
| No. 8 Northwestern $ | 8 | – | 0 | – | 0 | 10 | – | 2 | – | 0 |
| No. 6 Ohio State | 7 | – | 1 | – | 0 | 11 | – | 2 | – | 0 |
| No. 13 Penn State | 5 | – | 3 | – | 0 | 9 | – | 3 | – | 0 |
| No. 17 Michigan | 5 | – | 3 | – | 0 | 9 | – | 4 | – | 0 |
| Michigan State | 4 | – | 3 | – | 1 | 6 | – | 5 | – | 1 |
| No. 25 Iowa | 4 | – | 4 | – | 0 | 8 | – | 4 | – | 0 |
| Illinois | 3 | – | 4 | – | 1 | 5 | – | 5 | – | 1 |
| Wisconsin | 3 | – | 4 | – | 1 | 4 | – | 5 | – | 2 |
| Purdue | 2 | – | 5 | – | 1 | 4 | – | 6 | – | 1 |
| Minnesota | 1 | – | 7 | – | 0 | 3 | – | 8 | – | 0 |
| Indiana | 0 | – | 8 | – | 0 | 2 | – | 9 | – | 0 |
$ – Conference champion; Rankings from AP Poll

The 1995 Illinois Fighting Illini football team was an American football team that represented the University of Illinois at Urbana-Champaign as a member of the Big Ten Conference during the 1995 NCAA Division I-A football season. In their fourth year under head coach Lou Tepper, the Fighting Illini compiled a 5–5–1 record (3–4–1 in conference games), tied for seventh place in the Big Ten, and were outscored by a total of 198 to 193.

The team's statistical leaders included quarterback Johnny Johnson (1,110 passing yards), running back Robert Holcombe (1,051 rushing yards), wide receiver Jason Dulick (36 receptions for 453 yards), and kicker Bret Scheuplein (49 points scored).

The Illini's 3–3 tie with Wisconsin on November 25 was the last tie in NCAA Division I Football Bowl Subdivision (FBS) history as the NCAA implemented an overtime system following the season that eliminated the possibility of a tie.

The team played its home games at Memorial Stadium in Champaign, Illinois.

== Schedule ==
| Date | Time | Opponent | Rank | Site | TV | Result | Attendance |
|---|---|---|---|---|---|---|---|
| September 2 | 2:30 pm | No. 13 Michigan | No. 25 | Memorial Stadium; Champaign, IL (rivalry) | ABC | L 14–38 | 70,193 |
| September 9 | 9:00 pm | at No. 24 Oregon* | | Autzen Stadium; Eugene, OR | SCC | L 31–34 | 44,201 |
| September 16 | 11:30 am | No. 17 Arizona* | | Memorial Stadium; Champaign, IL | ESPN | W 9–7 | 57,134 |
| September 23 | 1:00 pm | East Carolina* | | Memorial Stadium; Champaign, IL | | W 7–0 | 60,545 |
| October 7 | 12:00 pm | at Indiana | | Memorial Stadium; Bloomington, Indiana (rivalry) | ESPN2 | W 17–10 | 38,098 |
| October 14 | 11:00 am | Michigan State | | Memorial Stadium; Champaign, IL | Creative | L 21–27 | 65,653 |
| October 28 | 11:00 am | No. 8 Northwestern | | Memorial Stadium; Champaign, IL (rivalry) | Creative | L 14–17 | 65,425 |
| November 4 | 11:30 am | at Iowa | | Kinnick Stadium; Iowa City, IA | ESPN | W 26–7 | 70,397 |
| November 11 | 2:30 pm | at No. 2 Ohio State | | Ohio Stadium; Columbus, OH (Illibuck) | ABC | L 3–41 | 92,639 |
| November 18 | 1:00 pm | Minnesota | | Memorial Stadium; Champaign, IL | | W 48–14 | 45,521 |
| November 25 | 2:30 pm | at Wisconsin | | Camp Randall Stadium; Madison, WI | Creative | T 3–3 | 76,750 |
*Non-conference game; Rankings from AP Poll released prior to the game; All times are in Central time

== Game summaries ==
=== Michigan ===
Michigan Wolverines at Illinois Fighting Illini

| Quarter | 1 | 2 | 3 | 4 | Total |
|---|---|---|---|---|---|
| Michigan | 7 | 3 | 21 | 7 | 38 |
| Illinois | 0 | 0 | 0 | 14 | 14 |

at Memorial Stadium, Champaign, Illinois

- Date: September 2, 1995
- Game time: 2:30 p.m. CST
- Game attendance: 70,193
- Box Score

Game information
First quarter
- MICH - C Howard 13 pass from Dreisbach (Hamilton kick)

Second quarter

- MICH - FG Hamilton 49

Third quarter

- MICH - Biakabutuka 5 run (Hamilton kick)
- MICH - Biakabutuka 11 run (Hamilton kick)
- MICH - Biakabutuka 35 run (Hamilton kick)

Fourth quarter

- MICH - A Williams 28 blocked punt return (Hamilton kick)
- ILL - Smith 5 run (B Scheuplein kick)
- ILL - L Willis 5 pass from Weaver (B Scheuplein kick)

=== At Oregon ===
Illinois Fighting Illini at Oregon Ducks

| Quarter | 1 | 2 | 3 | 4 | Total |
|---|---|---|---|---|---|
| Illinois | 7 | 12 | 12 | 0 | 31 |
| Oregon | 7 | 0 | 13 | 14 | 34 |

at Autzen Stadium, Eugene, Oregon

- Date: September 9, 1995
- Game time: 9:00 p.m. CST
- Game attendance: 44,201
- TV: ESPN
- Box score and Game recap

Game information
First quarter
- ORE - Whittle 24 run (J Smith kick)
- ILL - Dulick 41 pass from J Johnson (B Scheuplein kick)

Second quarter

- ILL - FG B Scheuplein 42
- ILL - Douthard 3 run (kick failed)
- ILL - FG B Scheuplein 27

Third quarter

- ORE - Whittle 12 run (J Smith kick)
- ILL - Douthard 1 run (two-point conversion failed)
- ORE - Byrd 1 run (kick failed)
- ILL - Holcombe 11 run (two-point conversion failed)

Fourth quarter

- ORE - Whittle 3 run (Ricketts reception for two-point conversion)
- ORE - Figueras recovered fumble in end zone (kick failed)

=== Arizona ===
Arizona Wildcats at Illinois Fighting Illini

| Quarter | 1 | 2 | 3 | 4 | Total |
|---|---|---|---|---|---|
| Arizona | 0 | 0 | 0 | 7 | 7 |
| Illinois | 0 | 0 | 0 | 9 | 9 |

at Memorial Stadium, Champaign, Illinois

- Date: September 16, 1995
- Game time: 11:30 a.m. CST
- Game attendance: 57,134
- Box Score

Game information
First quarter
- No scoring

Second quarter

- No scoring

Third quarter

- No scoring

Fourth quarter

- ILL - B. Scheuplein 47-yard field goal
- ARIZ - R. Williams 17-yard pass from White (Prasuhn kick)
- ILL - James 53-yard fumble return (kick failed)

=== East Carolina ===
East Carolina Pirates at Illinois Fighting Illini

| Quarter | 1 | 2 | 3 | 4 | Total |
|---|---|---|---|---|---|
| East Carolina | 0 | 0 | 0 | 0 | 0 |
| Illinois | 0 | 7 | 0 | 0 | 7 |

at Memorial Stadium, Champaign, Illinois

- Date: September 16, 1995
- Game time: 1:00 p.m. CST
- Game attendance: 60,545
- Box Score

Game information
First quarter
- No scoring

Second quarter

- ILL - Robert Holcombe 1-yard run (B. Scheuplein kick)

Third quarter

- No scoring

Fourth quarter

- No scoring

=== At Indiana ===
Illinois Fighting Illini at Indiana Hoosiers

| Quarter | 1 | 2 | 3 | 4 | Total |
|---|---|---|---|---|---|
| Illinois | 3 | 7 | 7 | 0 | 17 |
| Indiana | 3 | 7 | 0 | 0 | 10 |

at Memorial Stadium, Bloomington, Indiana

- Date: October 28, 1995
- Game time: 11:30 a.m. CST
- Game attendance: 38,098
- TV: ESPN
- Box score and Game recap

Game information

First quarter

- IND - FG Manolopoulos 45
- ILL - FG B Scheuplein 46

Second quarter

- ILL - McDonald 25 pass from Weaver (B Scheuplein kick)
- IND - Stoner 65 pass from Dittoe (Manolopoulos kick)

Third quarter

- ILL - Douthard 14 pass from Weaver (Mcdonald kick)

Fourth quarter

- no scoring

Top Rushers

- ILL - Havard - 17 rushes, 50 yards
- IND - Batts - 20 rushes, 56 yards

Top Passers

- ILL - Weaver - 16/28, 213 yards, 2 TDs, 3 INTs
- IND - Dittoe 10/22, 148 yards, 1 TD

Top Receivers

- ILL - Douthard 5 receptions, 52 yards
- IND - Stoner 5 receptions, 123 yards

=== Michigan State ===
Michigan State Spartans at Illinois Fighting Illini

| Quarter | 1 | 2 | 3 | 4 | Total |
|---|---|---|---|---|---|
| Michigan State | 7 | 6 | 6 | 8 | 27 |
| Illinois | 7 | 0 | 7 | 7 | 21 |

at Memorial Stadium, Champaign, Illinois

- Date: October 14, 1995
- Game time: 11:00 p.m. CST
- Game attendance: 65,653
- Box Score

Game information
First quarter
- MSU - S. Greene 16-yard run (Gardner kick)
- ILL - Douthard 1-yard run (Scheuplein kick)

Second quarter

- MSU - S. Greene 3-yard run (kick failed)

Third quarter

- ILL - Holcombe - 25-yard run (Scheuplein kick)
- MSU - S. Greene 3-yard run (Gardner kick)

Fourth quarter

- MSU - S. Greene 1-yard run (S. Greene run)
- ILL - Dulick 14-yard pass from J. Johnson (Scheuplein kick)

=== Northwestern ===
#8 Northwestern Wildcats at Illinois Fighting Illini

| Quarter | 1 | 2 | 3 | 4 | Total |
|---|---|---|---|---|---|
| Northwestern | 0 | 10 | 0 | 7 | 17 |
| Illinois | 7 | 7 | 0 | 0 | 14 |

at Memorial Stadium, Champaign, Illinois

- Date: October 28, 1995
- Game time: 11:00 p.m. CST
- Game attendance: 65,425
- TV: SCC
- Box Score

Game information
First quarter
- ILL - Weaver 1-yard run (Scheuplein kick)

Second quarter

- ILL - Robert Holcombe 7-yard run (Scheuplein kick)
- NU - Brian Gowins 49-yard field goal
- NU - D'Wayne Bates 43-yard pass from Steve Schnur (Gowins kick)

Third quarter

Fourth quarter

- NU - Darnell Autry 1-yard run (Gowins kick)

=== At Iowa ===
Illinois Fighting Illini at Iowa Hawkeyes

| Quarter | 1 | 2 | 3 | 4 | Total |
|---|---|---|---|---|---|
| Illinois | 3 | 7 | 6 | 10 | 26 |
| Iowa | 0 | 7 | 0 | 0 | 7 |

at Kinnick Stadium, Iowa City, Iowa

- Date: October 28, 1995
- Game time: 11:30 a.m. CST
- Game attendance: 70,397
- TV: ESPN
- Box score and Game recap

Game information
First quarter
- ILL - Scheuplein 24-yard field goal ILL 3–0

Second quarter

- IOWA - Tim Dwight 12-yard pass from Matt Sherman (Bromert kick) IOWA 7–3
- ILL - Cushing 5-yard pass from Johnson (Scheuplein kick) ILL 10–7

Third quarter

- ILL - Havard 35-yard run (run failed) ILL 16–7'

Fourth quarter

- ILL - Scheuplein 19-yard field goal ILL 19–7
- ILL - Douthard 3-yard run (Scheuplein kick) ILL 26–7

=== At Ohio State ===
Illinois Fighting Illini at Ohio State Buckeyes

| Quarter | 1 | 2 | 3 | 4 | Total |
|---|---|---|---|---|---|
| Illinois | 0 | 0 | 3 | 0 | 3 |
| Ohio State | 14 | 3 | 21 | 3 | 41 |

at Ohio Stadium, Columbus, Ohio

- Date: November 11
- Game time: 2:30 p.m. CST
- Game weather: Overcast, 37 °F (3 °C)
- Game attendance: 92,639
- Referee: Steve Pamon
- Box Score

Game information

First quarter

- OSU – Pepe Pearson 4-yard run (Josh Jackson kick), 8:27. Ohio St 7–0. Drive: 6 plays, 99 yards, 2:25.
- OSU – Dimitrious Stanley 14-yard pass from Bobby Hoying (Josh Jackson kick), 1:35. Ohio St 14–0. Drive: 9 plays, 61 yards, 4:51.

Second quarter

- OSU – Josh Jackson 20-yard field goal, 10:09. Ohio St 17–0. Drive: 10 plays, 57 yards, 5:20.

Third quarter

- ILL – Bret Scheuplein 42-yard field goal, 10:44. Ohio St 17–3. Drive: 10 plays, 58 yards, 4:10.
- OSU – Eddie George 64-yard run (Josh Jackson kick), 10:24. Ohio St 24–3. Drive: 1 play, 64 yards, 0:13.
- OSU – Eddie George 13-yard run (Josh Jackson kick), 3:07. Ohio St 31–3. Drive: 7 plays, 38 yards, 3:11.
- OSU – Eddie George 13-yard pass from Bobby Hoying (Josh Jackson kick), 0:58. Ohio St 38–3. Drive: 2 plays, 10 yards, 0:41.

Fourth quarter

- OSU – Josh Jackson 26-yard field goal, 8:31. Ohio St 41–3. Drive: 12 plays, 43 yards, 6:20.

Top passers

- ILL – Johnny Johnson – 11/18, 101 yards, INT
- OSU – Bobby Hoying – 8/13, 109 yards, 2 TD, INT

Top rushers

- ILL – Robert Holcombe – 14 rushes, 28 yards
- OSU – Eddie George – 36 rushes, 314 yards, 2 TD

Top receivers

- ILL – Steve Harvard – 3 receptions, 27 yards
- OSU – Rickey Dudley – 2 receptions, 53 yards

=== Minnesota ===
Minnesota Golden Gophers at Illinois Fighting Illini

| Quarter | 1 | 2 | 3 | 4 | Total |
|---|---|---|---|---|---|
| Minnesota | 0 | 7 | 7 | 0 | 14 |
| Illinois | 10 | 14 | 7 | 21 | 52 |

at Memorial Stadium, Champaign, Illinois

- Date: November 18, 1995
- Game time: 1:00 pm CST
- Game attendance: 45,521
- Box score

Game information

- Sources: Box score and Game recap

First quarter

- ILL - 9:46-Cushing 40 pass from J. Johnson (Scheuplein kick)
- ILL - 7:00-Scheuplein 44 FG

Second quarter

- ILL - 14:23-M. Johnson 2 run (Scheuplein kick)
- MIN - 3:06-Atwell 40 pass from Sauter (Chalberg kick)
- ILL - 0:56-J. Johnson 6 run (Scheuplein kick)

Third quarter

- ILL - 6:00-Scheuplein 29 FG
- MIN - 1:10-Cooper 2 pass from Sauter (Chalberg kick)

Fourth quarter

- ILL - 13:37-Dulick 6 pass from J. Johnson (Scheuplein kick)
- ILL - 9:55-Rice 27 fumble return (Scheuplein kick)
- ILL - 7:18-Holcombe 29 run (Scheuplein kick)

Top Rushers

- MIN - Rafael Cooper - 29 rushes, 94 yards
- MIN - Javon Jackson - 5 rushes, 34 yards
- ILL - Robert Holcombe - 24 rushes, 206 yards, 1 TD
- ILL - Ty Douthard - 8 rushes, 48 yards

Top Passers

- MIN - Cory Sauter - 34/21, 242 yards, 2 TDs, 2 INTs
- ILL - Johnny Johnson - 22/11, 174 yards, 2 TDs

Receiving

- MIN - Johnny Woodson - 6 receptions, 74 yards
- MIN - Tutu Atwell - 4 receptions, 62 yards, 1 TD
- ILL - Jason Dulick - 4 receptions, 61 yards, 1 TD
- ILL - Matt Cushing - 2 receptions, 51 yards, 1 TD

=== At Wisconsin ===
Illinois Fighting Illini at Wisconsin Badgers

| Quarter | 1 | 2 | 3 | 4 | Total |
|---|---|---|---|---|---|
| Illinois | 0 | 0 | 0 | 3 | 3 |
| Wisconsin | 0 | 0 | 3 | 0 | 3 |

at Camp Randall Stadium, Madison, Wisconsin

- Date: November 25, 1995
- Game time: 2:30 p.m. CST
- Game attendance: 76,750
- Box Score

Game information
Third quarter
- WIS - John Hall 29-yard field goal

Fourth quarter

- ILL - Scheuplein 51-yard field goal

== Roster ==
1995 Illinois Fighting Illini football team roster
Players
Coaches
Offense

| Pos. | # | Name | Class |
|---|---|---|---|
| TE | 86 | Matt Cushing | So |
| RB | 7 | Ty Douthard | Jr |
| WR | 83 | Jason Dulick | Jr |
| WR | | Steve Harvard |
| RB | 35 | Robert Holcombe | So |
| QB | | Johnny Johnson |
| WR | 6 | George McDonald | Fr |

Defense

| Pos. | # | Name | Class |
|---|---|---|---|
| LB | 51 | Kevin Hardy | Sr |
| DE | 97 | Simeon Rice | Sr |

Special teams

| Pos. | # | Name | Class |
|---|---|---|---|
| K | | Bret Scheuplein |

Head coach

- Lou Tepper

Coordinators/assistant coaches

- Paul Schudel – Offensive coordinator

Legend

- (C) Team captain
- (S) Suspended
- (I) Ineligible
- Injured
- Redshirt

Roster

== Awards and honors ==
- Kevin Hardy, Butkus Award

== 1996 NFL draft ==
Two of the top three overall picks in the 1996 NFL draft were from Illinois.

| Player | Round | Pick | Position | Club |
| Kevin Hardy | 1 | 2 | Linebacker | Jacksonville Jaguars |
| Simeon Rice | 1 | 3 | Defensive end | Arizona Cardinals |
| Ken Blackman | 3 | 69 | Guard | Cincinnati Bengals |
