= 1995 Indiana Hoosiers football team =

American college football season

1995 Indiana Hoosiers football
- Conference: Big Ten Conference
- Record: 2–9 (0–8 Big Ten)
- Head coach: Bill Mallory (12th season)
- Defensive coordinator: Joe Novak (12th season)
- MVP: Sean Glover
- Captains: Sean Glover; John Hammerstein
- Home stadium: Memorial Stadium

1995 Big Ten Conference football standings
	Conf.					Overall
Team	W		L		T	W		L		T
No. 8 Northwestern $	8	–	0	–	0	10	–	2	–	0
No. 6 Ohio State	7	–	1	–	0	11	–	2	–	0
No. 13 Penn State	5	–	3	–	0	9	–	3	–	0
No. 17 Michigan	5	–	3	–	0	9	–	4	–	0
Michigan State	4	–	3	–	1	6	–	5	–	1
No. 25 Iowa	4	–	4	–	0	8	–	4	–	0
Illinois	3	–	4	–	1	5	–	5	–	1
Wisconsin	3	–	4	–	1	4	–	5	–	2
Purdue	2	–	5	–	1	4	–	6	–	1
Minnesota	1	–	7	–	0	3	–	8	–	0
Indiana	0	–	8	–	0	2	–	9	–	0
$ – Conference champion; Rankings from AP Poll

The 1995 Indiana Hoosiers football team represented Indiana University Bloomington as a member of the Big Ten Conference during the 1995 NCAA Division I-A football season. Led by 12th-year head coach Bill Mallory, the Hoosiers compiled an overall record of 2–9 with a mark of 0–8 in conference play, placing last out of 11 teams in the Big Ten. The team played home games at Memorial Stadium in Bloomington, Indiana.

== Schedule ==
Date	Time	Opponent	Site	TV	Result	Attendance	Source
September 9		Western Michigan*	Memorial Stadium; Bloomington, IN		W 24–10	30,856	
September 16		Kentucky*	Memorial Stadium; Bloomington, IN (rivalry)		L 10–17	37,225	
September 23		Southern Miss*	Memorial Stadium; Bloomington, IN		W 27–26	31,216	
September 30	1:00 pm	at Northwestern	Dyche Stadium; Evanston, IL		L 7–31	29,223	
October 7	12:00 pm	Illinois^{†}	Memorial Stadium; Bloomington, IN (rivalry)	ESPN2	L 10–17	38,098	
October 14	11:00 am	at No. 23 Iowa	Kinnick Stadium; Iowa City, IA	ESPN2	L 13–22	69,520	
October 21	12:00 pm	No. 10 Michigan	Memorial Stadium; Bloomington, IN	ESPN Plus	L 17–34	44,623	
October 28	12:00 pm	at No. 16 Penn State	Beaver Stadium; University Park, PA	ESPN2	L 21–45	96,391	
November 11	1:00 pm	Michigan State	Memorial Stadium; Bloomington, IN (rivalry)	PASS Sports	L 13–31	24,027	
November 18	12:30 pm	at No. 2 Ohio State	Ohio Stadium; Columbus, OH	ESPN	L 3–42	92,352	
November 24	11:00 am	Purdue	Memorial Stadium; Bloomington, IN (Old Oaken Bucket)	Creative	L 14–51	34,029	
*Non-conference game; ^{†}Homecoming; Rankings from AP Poll released prior to the game

== Game summaries ==
=== Western Michigan ===
Western Michigan Broncos at Indiana Hoosiers

Quarter	1	2	3	4	Total
Western Michigan	10	0	0	0	10
Indiana	0	10	7	7	24

at Memorial Stadium, Bloomington, Indiana

- Date: September 9, 1995
- Game attendance: 30,856
- TV: ESPN
- Box score and Game recap

Game information
First quarter
- WMU - FG Knope 31
- WMU - Heppell 60 run (Knope kick)

Second quarter

- IND - FG Manolopoulos 40
- IND - Glover 1 run (Manolopoulos kick)

Third quarter

- IND - Dittoe 1 run (Manolopoulos kick)

Fourth quarter

- IND - Batts 2 run (Manolopoulos kick)

=== Kentucky ===
Kentucky Wildcats at Indiana Hoosiers

Quarter	1	2	3	4	Total
Kentucky	0	7	0	10	17
Indiana	10	0	0	0	10

at Memorial Stadium, Bloomington, Indiana

- Date: September 16, 1995
- Game attendance: 37,225
- Box score

Game information
First quarter
- IND - FG Manolopoulos 42
- IND - Smith 19 run (Manolopoulos kick)

Second quarter

- UK - M Williams 1 run (Sivinski kick)

Third quarter

- No scoring

Fourth quarter

- UK - Haskins 42 run (Sivinski kick)
- UK - FG Sivinski 49

=== Southern Miss ===
Southern Miss Golden Eagles at Indiana Hoosiers

Quarter	1	2	3	4	Total
Southern Miss	7	0	13	6	26
Indiana	7	10	0	10	27

at Memorial Stadium, Bloomington, Indiana

- Date: September 23, 1995
- Game attendance: 31,216
- Box score

Game information
First quarter
- USM - Buckhalter 58 run (Pierce kick)
- IND - Dittoe 1 run (Manolopoulos kick)

Second quarter

- IND - Dittoe 2 run (Manolopoulos kick)
- IND - FG Manolopoulos 23

Third quarter

- USM - Windsor 1 run (kick failed)
- USM - F Brock 23 pass from Graham (Pierce kick)

Fourth quarter

- IND - FG Manolopoulos 29
- IND - Robinson 3 fumble return (Manolopoulos kick)
- USM - Booth 6 pass from Graham (kick failed)

=== Northwestern ===
Indiana Hoosiers at Northwestern Wildcats

Quarter	1	2	3	4	Total
Indiana	0	7	0	0	7
Northwestern	3	7	11	10	31

at Dyche Stadium, Evanston, Illinois

- Date: September 30, 1995
- Game time: 1:00 p.m. EST
- Game attendance: 29,223
- Box Score

Game information

First quarter

- NU - Sam Valenzisi 40-yard field goal

Second quarter

- IND - Chris Dittoe 2-yard run (Manolopoulos kick)
- NU - Darnell Autry 42-yard run (Valenzisi kick)

Third quarter

- NU - Sam Valenzisi 34-yard field goal
- NU - Darnell Autry 6-yard run (Beazley pass from Schnur)

'Fourth quarter

- NU - Casey Dailey 43-yard fumble return (Valenzisi kick)
- NU - Sam Valenzisi 32-yard field goal

Individual Statistics

Top Rushers

- IND - Smith - 23 rushes, 136 yards
- NU - Darnell Autry - 28 rushes, 162 yards, 2 TDs

Top Passers

- IND - Dittoe 15/27, 155 yards, 1 INT
- NU - Schnur - 7/13, 45 yards

Top Receivers

- IND - Stoner 8 receptions, 102 yards
- NU - M Hartl 3 receptions, 29 yards

=== Illinois ===
Illinois Fighting Illini at Indiana Hoosiers

Quarter	1	2	3	4	Total
Illinois	3	7	7	0	17
Indiana	3	7	0	0	10

at Memorial Stadium, Bloomington, Indiana

- Date: October 28, 1995
- Game time: 11:30 a.m. CST
- Game attendance: 38,098
- TV: ESPN
- Box score and Game recap

Game information

First quarter

- IND - FG Manolopoulos 45
- ILL - FG B Scheuplein 46

Second quarter

- ILL - McDonald 25 pass from Weaver (B Scheuplein kick)
- IND - Stoner 65 pass from Dittoe (Manolopoulos kick)

Third quarter

- ILL - Douthard 14 pass from Weaver (Mcdonald kick)

Fourth quarter

- no scoring

Top Rushers

- ILL - Havard - 17 rushes, 50 yards
- IND - Batts - 20 rushes, 56 yards

Top Passers

- ILL - Weaver - 16/28, 213 yards, 2 TDs, 3 INTs
- IND - Dittoe 10/22, 148 yards, 1 TD

Top Receivers

- ILL - Douthard 5 receptions, 52 yards
- IND - Stoner 5 receptions, 123 yards

=== Iowa ===
Indiana Hoosiers at Iowa Hawkeyes

Quarter	1	2	3	4	Total
Indiana	0	10	0	3	13
Iowa	7	0	7	8	22

at Kinnick Stadium, Iowa City, Iowa

- Date: October 14, 1995
- Game time: 11:00 a.m. EST
- Game attendance: 69,520
- Box Score

Game information
First quarter
- IOWA - Dwight 56-yard run (Bromert kick)

Second quarter

- IND - Glover 1-yard run (Manolopoulos kick)
- IND - Manolopoulos 34-yard field goal

Third quarter

- IOWA - Shaw 7 yard run (Bromert kick)
- IND - Manolopoulos 23-yard field goal

Fourth quarter

- IOWA - Knight 60-yard interception return (Driscoll run)

=== Michigan ===
Michigan Wolverines at Indiana Hoosiers

Quarter	1	2	3	4	Total
Michigan	10	14	7	3	34
Indiana	3	0	7	7	17

at Memorial Stadium, Bloomington, Indiana

- Date: October 21, 1995
- Game time: 12:00 p.m. EST
- Game attendance: 44,623
- TV: ESPN
- Box score and Game recap

Game information

First quarter

- IND - FG Manolopoulos 37
- MICH - FG Hamilton 22
- MICH - Toomer 56 punt return (Hamilton kick)

Second quarter

- MICH - Davis 2 run (Hamilton kick)
- MICH - Tuman 3 pass from Griese (Hamilton kick)

Third quarter

- MICH - Toomer 3 pass from Griese (Hamilton kick)
- IND - Greenlee 9 run (Horn kick)

Fourth quarter

- MICH - FG Hamilton 25
- IND - Goode 2 pass from Greenlee (Horn kick)

Top Rushers

- MICH - Biakabutuka - 16 rushes, 111 yards
- IND - Greenlee - 7 rushes, 22 yards

Top Passers

- MICH - Griese - 14/21, 127 yards, 2 TDs
- IND - Greenlee - 23/40, 229 yards, 1 TD, 2 INTs

Top Receivers

- MICH - C. Howard 5 receptions, 28 yards
- MICH - Amani Toomer - 3 receptions, 53 yards, 1 TD
- IND - Glover - 9 receptions, 62 yards

=== Penn State ===
Indiana Hoosiers at Penn State Nittany Lions

Quarter	1	2	3	4	Total
Indiana	0	0	0	21	21
Penn State	14	10	14	7	45

at Beaver Stadium, State College, Pennsylvania

- Date: October 28, 1995
- Game time: 12:00 p.m. EST
- Game attendance: 96,391
- Game Recap

Game information
First quarter

Second quarter Third quarter Fourth quarter

=== Michigan State ===
Michigan State Spartans at Indiana Hoosiers

Quarter	1	2	3	4	Total
Michigan State	21	0	10	0	31
Indiana	7	0	6	0	13

at Memorial Stadium, Bloomington, Indiana

- Date: November 11, 1995
- Game time: 1:00 p.m.
- Game attendance: 24,027
- Box Score

Game information
First quarter
- MSU - Renaud 59-yard run (Gardner kick)
- MSU - Greene 76-yard punt return (Gardner kick)
- IND - Smith 5-yard run (Horn kick)
- MSU - Mason 87-yard kickoff return (Gardner kick)

Second quarter

- No scoring

Third quarter

- MSU - Gardner 23-yard field goal
- IND - Eloms 31-yard interception return (kick failed)
- MSU - Chapman 4-yard pass from Banks (Gardner kick)

Fourth quarter

- No scoring

=== Ohio State ===
Indiana Hoosiers at Ohio State Buckeyes

Quarter	1	2	3	4	Total
Indiana	3	0	0	0	3
Ohio State	14	7	7	14	42

at Ohio Stadium, Columbus, Ohio

- Date: November 18
- Game time: 12:30 p.m.
- Game weather: Overcast, 46 °F (8 °C), Wind SW 3-10
- Game attendance: 92,352
- Referee: Dick Honig
- Box Score

Game information

First quarter

- OSU – Terry Glenn 12-yard pass from Bobby Hoying (Josh Jackson kick)
- IND - Bill Manolopolous 22-yard field goal
- OSU – Terry Glenn 4-yard pass from Bobby Hoying (Josh Jackson kick)

Second quarter

- OSU – Eddie George 1-yard run (Josh Jackson kick)

Third quarter

- OSU – Eddie George 1-yard run (Josh Jackson kick)

Fourth quarter

- OSU – Rickey Dudley 2-yard pass from Stanley Jackson (Josh Jackson kick)
- OSU - Pepe Pearson 8-yard run (Josh Jackson kick)

Top passers

- OSU – Bobby Hoying – 12/17, 203 yards, 2 TD, 2 INTs
- IND - Dittoe - 10/23, 103 yards, 1 INT

Top rushers

- OSU – Eddie George – 26 rushes, 130 yards, 2 TDs
- OSU - Pepe Pearson - 14 rushes, 79 yards, 1 TD

Top receivers

- OSU - Terry Glenn - 5 receptions, 103 yards, 2 TDs
- OSU – Buster Tillman – 3 receptions, 93 yards

Top tacklers

- IND - Shedley - 6 solo, 6 assists (12 total)
- IND - Dean - 7 solo, 5 assists (12 total)
- IND - Robinson - 5 solo, 7 assists (12 total)

Interceptions

- OSU - 2, Damon Moore (1), Greg Bellisari (1)
- IND - 2, Allen (1), Robinson (1)

=== Purdue ===
Purdue Boilermakers at Indiana Hoosiers

Quarter	1	2	3	4	Total
Purdue	10	14	21	6	51
Indiana	7	7	14	0	28

at Memorial Stadium, Bloomington, Indiana

- Date: November 24, 1995
- Game time: 11:00 a.m.
- Game attendance: 34,029
- Box Score

Game information

First quarter

- PUR - Alstott 1-yard run (Bobich kick)
- PUR - Bobich 26-yard field goal

Second quarter

- PUR - Alford 7-yard pass from Trefzger (Bobich kick)
- PUR - Alford 10-yard pass from Trefzger (Bobich kick)
- IND - Greenlee 3-yard run (Horn kick)

Third quarter

- PUR - Rogers 2-yard run (Bobich kick)
- IND - Smith 6-yard run (Horn kick)
- PUR - Alstott 1-yard run (Bobich kick)
- PUR - Alstott 62-yard run (Bobich kick)

Fourth quarter

- PUR - Watson 3-yard run (kick failed)

Top Rushers

- PUR - Mike Alstott - 25 rushes, 264 yards, 3 TDs
- IND - Smith - 17 rushes, 64 yards, 1 TD

Top Passers

- PUR - Rick Trefzger - 10/16, 161 yards, 2 TDs
- IND - Greenlee - 17/32, 154 yards

Top Receivers

- PUR - Allen - 5 receptions, 99 yards
- IND - Stoner - 6 receptions, 50 yards

== 1996 NFL draftees ==
Player	Round	Pick	Position	NFL team
Eric Smedley	7	249	Defensive back	Buffalo Bills
