= 1996 Florida Citrus Bowl =

American college football game

1996 CompUSA Florida Citrus Bowl
Ohio State Buckeyes	Tennessee Volunteers
(11–1)	(10–1)
Big Ten	SEC
14	20
Head coach: John Cooper	Head coach: Phillip Fulmer
AP / Coaches / BA; T–4 / 5 / 5	AP / Coaches / BA; T–4 / 4 / 4
	1	2	3	4	Total
Ohio State	7	0	0	7	14
Tennessee	0	7	7	6	20
- Date: January 1, 1996
- Season: 1995
- Stadium: Florida Citrus Bowl
- Location: Orlando, Florida
- Referee: Steve Usechek (Big Eight)
- Attendance: 70,797

United States TV coverage
- Network: ABC
- Announcers: Brent Musburger and Dick Vermeil

The 1996 Florida Citrus Bowl was a college football bowl game featuring the Ohio State Buckeyes of the Big Ten, against the Tennessee Volunteers of the SEC. The Buckeyes were sparked by their senior Heisman Trophy winner running back Eddie George. The Vols were led by sophomore quarterback Peyton Manning. Both teams entered the game with losses to rival teams.

The Buckeyes started off the season with a surprising win over Notre Dame. However, the media buzz around the Big Ten surrounded the Northwestern Wildcats who earned their way to an unbeaten conference run. Because the Buckeyes held the tiebreaker over the Wildcats, the only thing between the Buckeyes invitation into the Rose Bowl and a possible National Championship was their rival the Michigan Wolverines. However, running back Tim Biakabutuka led the Wolverines to a 31-23 upset, sending the 'Cats to the Rose Bowl.

Tennessee started off the season with victories over East Carolina and Georgia, before heading off to Gainesville to play the rival Gators. The Vols held a 30–21 halftime lead only to be outscored 41–7 in the second half, suffering a 62–37 defeat. However, the team won their remaining 8 regular season games, including a 41–14 win over Alabama. The Vols ended the season ranked third.

== Scoring summary ==
First quarter

- Ohio State – Eddie George 2 yard run (Josh Jackson kick) – OSU 7, Tenn 0 2:07

Second quarter

- Tennessee – Graham 69 yard run (Hall kick) – Tenn 7, OSU 7 0:23

Third quarter

- Tennessee – Kent 47 yard pass from Peyton Manning (Hall kick) – Tenn 14, OSU 7 13:22

Fourth quarter

- Ohio State – Rickey Dudley 32 yard pass from Bobby Hoying (Jackson kick) – Tenn 14, OSU 14 14:40
- Tennessee – Hall 29 yard Field goal – Tenn 17, OSU 14 9:24
- Tennessee – Hall 25 yard Field goal – Tenn 20, OSU 14 2:06
