= 1995 Independence Bowl =

1995 Poulan/Weed Eater Independence Bowl
- Independence Bowl XX
Michigan State Spartans	LSU Tigers
(6–4–1)	(6–4–1)
Big Ten	SEC
26	45
Head coach: Nick Saban	Head coach: Gerry DiNardo
	1	2	3	4	Total
Michigan State	7	17	0	2	26
LSU	7	14	21	3	45
- Date: December 29, 1995
- Season: 1995
- Stadium: Independence Stadium
- Location: Shreveport, Louisiana
- MVP: Kevin Faulk, RB; Gabe Northern, DE
- Referee: Terry Turlington (Big Eight)
- Attendance: 48,835

United States TV coverage
- Network: ESPN
- Announcers: Jerry Punch (Play by Play); Bill Lewis (Analyst)

The 1995 Independence Bowl was a college football postseason bowl game between the LSU Tigers and the Michigan State Spartans.

== Background ==
This was the first Independence Bowl to have an at large bid for the Southeastern Conference, which continued on until 2009. The Spartans were 5th in the Big Ten Conference in Nick Saban's first year with the program. LSU was 4th in the Western Division of the Southeastern Conference in Gerry DiNardo's first year with the program as well. This was the first Independence Bowl for both teams.

== Game summary ==
Muhsin Muhammad gave the Spartans the lead after catching a touchdown pass from Tony Banks in the first quarter. LSU tied the game on a touchdown run before the quarter ended. Michigan State took the lead again on a Greene touchdown run. A kickoff return for a touchdown by the Spartans along with a field goal by Gardner made it 24-7. Eddie Kennison, however, would give the Tigers life. A 92-yard kickoff return narrowed the lead to 10, and Kevin Faulk's 51 yard touchdown run made the halftime deficit 24-21. The second half was all LSU as Faulk ran for a second touchdown, Gabe Northern recovered a fumble 37 yards for a touchdown, and Kennison caught a touchdown pass from Herb Tyler to give LSU a 42-24 lead by the time the fourth quarter started. The final period had only a LSU field goal and a Spartan safety as the Spartans' six turnovers and limited success with rushing doomed them as LSU won their first Independence Bowl. MVP Kevin Faulk had 234 yards on 25 carries for an average of 9.5 yards. Both the yards and yards per carry are Independence Bowl records.

== Aftermath ==
The Tigers returned to Shreveport for the Independence Bowl two years later, in 1997. The Spartans have not returned to Shreveport since this game. Saban left Michigan State for LSU after the 1999 season.

== Statistics ==
Statistics	LSU	Michigan State
First downs	17	23
Yards rushing	272	100
Yards passing	146	348
Total yards	418	448
Punts-Average	4-44.5	6-37.5
Fumbles-Lost	2-1	4-3
Interceptions	1	3
Penalties-Yards	5-42	9-80
