= 1995 Michigan State Spartans football team =

American college football season

1995 Michigan State Spartans football

Independence Bowl, L 26–45 vs. LSU
- Conference: Big Ten Conference
- Record: 6–5–1 (4–3–1 Big Ten)
- Head coach: Nick Saban (1st season)
- Offensive coordinator: Gary Tranquill (1st season)
- Offensive scheme: Pro set
- Defensive coordinator: Dean Pees (1st season)
- Base defense: 4–3
- MVP: Scott Greene
- Captains: Yakini Allen; Tony Banks; Scott Greene
- Home stadium: Spartan Stadium

1995 Big Ten Conference football standings
	Conf.					Overall
Team	W		L		T	W		L		T
No. 8 Northwestern $	8	–	0	–	0	10	–	2	–	0
No. 6 Ohio State	7	–	1	–	0	11	–	2	–	0
No. 13 Penn State	5	–	3	–	0	9	–	3	–	0
No. 17 Michigan	5	–	3	–	0	9	–	4	–	0
Michigan State	4	–	3	–	1	6	–	5	–	1
No. 25 Iowa	4	–	4	–	0	8	–	4	–	0
Illinois	3	–	4	–	1	5	–	5	–	1
Wisconsin	3	–	4	–	1	4	–	5	–	2
Purdue	2	–	5	–	1	4	–	6	–	1
Minnesota	1	–	7	–	0	3	–	8	–	0
Indiana	0	–	8	–	0	2	–	9	–	0
$ – Conference champion; Rankings from AP Poll

The 1995 Michigan State Spartans football team competed on behalf of Michigan State University as member of the Big Ten Conference during the 1995 NCAA Division I-A football season. Led by first-year head coach Nick Saban, the Spartans compiled an overall record of 6–5–1 with a mark of 4–3–1 in conference play, placing fifth in Big Ten. Michigan State was invited to the Independence Bowl, where they lost on December 29 to LSU. The team played home games at Spartan Stadium in East Lansing, Michigan.

== Schedule ==
Date	Time	Opponent	Site	TV	Result	Attendance	Source
September 9	12:00 p.m.	No. 2 Nebraska*	Spartan Stadium; East Lansing, MI	ABC	L 10–50	73,891	
September 16	12:00 p.m.	at Louisville*	Cardinal Stadium; Louisville, KY		W 30–7	34,027	
September 23	2:30 p.m.	at Purdue	Ross–Ade Stadium; West Lafayette, IN	ABC	T 35–35	43,070	
September 30	12:00 p.m.	Boston College*	Spartan Stadium; East Lansing, MI	ABC	W 25–21	72,981	
October 7	12:00 p.m.	Iowa^{†}	Spartan Stadium; East Lansing, MI	Creative	L 7–21	73,732	
October 14	12:00 p.m.	at Illinois	Memorial Stadium; Champaign, IL	Creative	W 27–21	65,653	
October 21	1:00 p.m.	Minnesota	Spartan Stadium; East Lansing, MI		W 34–31	70,123	
October 28	12:00 p.m.	at Wisconsin	Camp Randall Stadium; Madison, WI	Creative	L 14–45	78,043	
November 4	3:30 p.m.	No. 7 Michigan	Spartan Stadium; East Lansing, MI (rivalry)	ABC	W 28–25	74,667	
November 11	1:00 p.m.	at Indiana	Memorial Stadium; Bloomington, IN (rivalry)	PASS Sports	W 31–13	24,027	
November 25	3:30 p.m.	No. 14 Penn State	Spartan Stadium; East Lansing, MI (rivalry)	ESPN	L 20–24	66,189	
December 29	5:30 p.m.	vs. LSU*	Independence Stadium; Shreveport, LA (Independence Bowl)	ESPN	L 26–45	48,835	
*Non-conference game; ^{†}Homecoming; Rankings from AP Poll released prior to the game; All times are in Eastern time

== Game summaries ==
=== Nebraska ===
Nebraska Cornhuskers at Michigan State Spartans

Quarter	1	2	3	4	Total
Nebraska	10	10	16	14	50
Michigan State	7	0	3	0	10

at Spartan Stadium, East Lansing, Michigan

- Date: September 9, 1995
- Game time: 12:00 p.m. EST
- Game attendance: 73,891
- Box score and Game recap

Game information
First quarter
- NEB - FG K Brown 22
- NEB - Phillips 2 run (K Brown kick)
- MSU - Muhammad 16 pass from Banks (C Gardner kick)

Second quarter

- NEB - Phillips 1 run (K Brown kick)
- NEB - FG K Brown 47

Third quarter

- NEB - FG K Brown 20
- MSU - FG C Gardner 24
- NEB - Phillips 1 run (two-point conversion failed)
- NEB - Phillips 50 run (K Brown kick)

Fourth quarter

- NEB - Green 57 run (K Brown kick)
- NEB - Sims 80 run (Retzlaff kick)

=== Louisville ===
Michigan State Spartans at Louisville Cardinals

Quarter	1	2	3	4	Total
Michigan State	3	10	9	8	30
Louisville	0	7	0	0	7

at Cardinal Stadium, Louisville, Kentucky

- Date: September 16, 1995
- Game time: 12:00 p.m. EST
- Game attendance: 34,027
- Box Score

Game information
First quarter
- MSU - FG C Gardner 32

Second quarter

- UL - Tyson 2 pass from Lowe (Akers kick)
- MSU - S Greene 7 run (C Gardner kick)
- MSU - FG C Gardner 37

Third quarter

- MSU - Banks 19 run (two-point conversion failed)
- MSU - FG C Gardner 27

Fourth quarter

- MSU - S Greene 2 run (two-point conversion failed)
- MSU - Safety, Arrington tackled in end zone

=== Purdue ===
Michigan State Spartans at Purdue Boilermakers

Quarter	1	2	3	4	Total
Michigan State	14	6	8	7	35
Purdue	7	14	0	14	35

at Ross-Ade Stadium, West Lafayette, Indiana

- Date: September 23, 1995
- Game time: 2:30 p.m. EST
- Game attendance: 43,070
- Box Score

Game information

First quarter

- MSU - Mason 43 pass from Banks (C Gardner kick)
- PUR - Alford 29 pass from Reeves (Bobich kick)
- MSU - S Greene 21 run (C Gardner kick)

Second quarter

- PUR - Alford 69 pass from Alstott (Bobich kick)
- PUR - Alstott 6 run (Bobich kick)
- MSU - Mason 7 pass from Banks (kick failed)

Third quarter

- MSU - S Greene 3 run (Banks run for two-point conversion)

Fourth quarter

- PUR - Rogers 1 run (Bobich kick)
- MSU - S Greene 70 run (C Gardner kick)
- PUR - Rogers 4 run (Bobich kick)

Top Rushers

- MSU - S Greene 17 rushes, 161 yards, 3 TDs
- PUR - Alstott 20 rushes, 136 yards, 1 TD

Top Passers

- MSU - Banks 16/25, 208 yards, 1 INT
- PUR - Alstott 1/1, 69 yards, 1 TD
- PUR - Trefzger 9/15, 110 yards
- PUR - Reeves 9/16, 122 yards, 1 TD, 2 INTs

Top Receivers

- MSU - Mason 7 receptions, 150 yards, 2 TDs
- PUR - Olivadotti 5 receptions, 73 yards
- PUR - Alford 4 receptions, 113 yards, 2 TDs

=== Boston College ===
Boston College Eagles at Michigan State Spartans

Quarter	1	2	3	4	Total
Boston College	0	15	6	0	21
Michigan State	3	6	13	3	25

at Spartan Stadium, East Lansing, Michigan

- Date: September 30, 1995
- Game time: 12:00 p.m. EST
- Game attendance: 72,981
- Box score and Game recap

Game information
First quarter
- MSU - FG C Gardner 27

Second quarter

- BC - Watson 38 run (Mcguire kick)
- MSU - Muhammad 34 pass from Schultz (kick failed)
- BC - Harding 4 pass from Hartsell (Hemmert reception for two-point conversion)

Third quarter

- BC - Hemmert 4 pass from Hartsell (two-point conversion failed)
- MSU - Chapman 3 pass from Schultz (C Gardner kick)
- MSU - S Greene 1 run (two-point conversion failed)

Fourth quarter

- MSU - FG C Gardner 19

=== Iowa ===
Iowa Hawkeyes at Michigan State Spartans

Quarter	1	2	3	4	Total
Iowa	0	6	8	7	21
Michigan State	0	7	0	0	7

at Spartan Stadium, East Lansing, Michigan

- Date: October 7, 1995
- Game time: 12:00 p.m. EST
- Game attendance: 73,732
- Box score and Game recap

Game information
First quarter
- No scoring

Second quarter

- IOWA - Bromert 37-yard field goal
- MSU - S. Greene 2-yard run (C Gardner kick)
- IOWA - Hurley 50-yard field goal

Third quarter

- IOWA - Dwight 11-yard pass from Sherman (S Shaw reception for two-point conversion)

Fourth quarter

- IOWA - S Shaw 7-yard run (Bromert kick)

=== Illinois ===
Michigan State Spartans at Illinois Fighting Illini

Quarter	1	2	3	4	Total
Michigan State	7	6	6	8	27
Illinois	7	0	7	7	21

at Memorial Stadium, Champaign, Illinois

- Date: October 14, 1995
- Game time: 12:00 p.m. EST
- Game attendance: 65,653
- Box Score

Game information
First quarter
- MSU - S. Greene 16-yard run (Gardner kick)
- ILL - Douthard 1-yard run (Scheuplein kick)

Second quarter

- MSU - S. Greene 3-yard run (kick failed)

Third quarter

- ILL - Holcombe - 25-yard run (Scheuplein kick)
- MSU - S. Greene 3-yard run (Gardner kick)

Fourth quarter

- MSU - S. Greene 1-yard run (S. Greene run)
- ILL - Dulick 14-yard pass from J. Johnson (Scheuplein kick)

=== Minnesota ===
Minnesota Golden Gophers at Michigan State Spartans

Quarter	1	2	3	4	Total
Minnesota	7	10	14	0	31
Michigan State	14	7	0	13	34

at Spartan Stadium, East Lansing, Michigan

- Date: October 21, 1995
- Game time: 12:00 p.m. EST
- Game attendance: 70,123
- Box Score

Game information
First quarter
- MIN - 10:23-Atwell 58 pass from Sauter (Chalberg kick)
- MSU - 6:39-Renaud 9 run (Gardner kick)
- MSU - 0:25-Renaud 18 run (Gardner kick)

Second quarter

- MIN - 11:56-Chalberg 45 FG
- MSU - 6:52-Carter 33 pass from Banks (Gardner kick)
- MIN - 3:45-Duerr 1 pass from Sauter (Chalberg kick)

Third quarter

- MIN - 4:12-Thelwell 8 pass from Sauter (Chalberg kick)
- MIN - 2:33-Thelwell 21 pass from Sauter (Chalberg kick)

Fourth quarter

- MSU - 14:11-Gardner 27 FG
- MSU - 9:55-Mason 65 pass from Banks (Gardner kick)
- MSU - 4:50-Gardner 24 FG

=== Wisconsin ===
Michigan State Spartans at Wisconsin Badgers

Quarter	1	2	3	4	Total
Michigan State	7	0	0	7	14
Wisconsin	7	17	14	7	45

at Camp Randall Stadium, Madison, Wisconsin

- Date: October 28, 1995
- Game time: 11:30 a.m. CST
- Game attendance: 78,447
- Box Score

Game information

First quarter

- WIS - C. Martin 5-yard run (J. Hall kick)
- MSU - S. Greene 2-yard run (C. Gardner kick)

Second quarter

- WIS - J. Hall 43-yard FG
- WIS - C. Martin 5-yard run (J. Hall kick)
- WIS - Nyquist 7-yard pass from Bevell (J. Hall kick)

Third quarter

- WIS - T. Simmons 1-yard pass from Bevell (J. Hall kick)
- WIS - Nyquist 2-yard pass from Bevell (J. Hall kick)

Fourth quarter

- MSU - Mason 31-yard pass from Banks (C. Gardner kick)
- WIS - Waerig 12-yard run (J. Hall kick)

Top Rushers

- MSU - Crenshaw 5 rushes, 41 yards
- WIS - C. McCullough 19 rushes, 91 yards

Top Passers

- MSU - Banks 17/30, 207 yards, 3 INTs
- WIS - Bevell 17/27, 265 yards

Top Receivers

- MSU - Muhammad 6 receptions, 83 yards
- WIS - T Simmons 5 receptions, 70 yards

=== Michigan ===
Michigan Wolverines at Michigan State Spartans

Quarter	1	2	3	4	Total
Michigan	3	0	8	14	25
Michigan State	0	14	0	14	28

at Spartan Stadium, East Lansing, Michigan

- Date: November 4, 1995
- Game time: 3:30 p.m. EST
- Game attendance: 74,667
- Box Score

Game information
First quarter
- UM - Hamilton 35-yard field goal

Second quarter

- MSU - Mason 70-yard punt return (Gardner kick)
- MSU - Greene 7-yard run (Gardner kick)

Third quarter

- UM - W. Carr 3-yard run (Campbell pass from Griese)

Fourth quarter

- UM - Biakabutuka 5-yard run (Hamilton kick)
- MSU - Greene 1-yard run (Gardner kick)
- UM - Hayes 22-yard pass from Griese (Hamilton kick)
- MSU - Carter 25-yard pass from Banks (Gardner kick)

=== Indiana ===
Michigan State Spartans at Indiana Hoosiers

Quarter	1	2	3	4	Total
Michigan State	21	0	10	0	31
Indiana	7	0	6	0	13

at Memorial Stadium, Bloomington, Indiana

- Date: November 11, 1995
- Game time: 1:00 p.m.
- Game attendance: 24,027
- Box Score

Game information
First quarter
- MSU - Renaud 59-yard run (Gardner kick)
- MSU - Greene 76-yard punt return (Gardner kick)
- IND - Smith 5-yard run (Horn kick)
- MSU - Mason 87-yard kickoff return (Gardner kick)

Second quarter

- No scoring

Third quarter

- MSU - Gardner 23-yard field goal
- IND - Eloms 31-yard interception return (kick failed)
- MSU - Chapman 4-yard pass from Banks (Gardner kick)

Fourth quarter

- No scoring

=== Penn State ===
Penn State Nittany Lions at Michigan State Spartans

Quarter	1	2	3	4	Total
Penn State	0	7	3	14	24
Michigan State	0	10	0	10	20

at Spartan Stadium, East Lansing, Michigan

- Date: November 25, 1995
- Game time: 3:30 p.m. EST
- Game attendance: 66,189
- Box Score

Game information
First quarter
- No scoring

Second quarter

- PSU - Milne 1-yard run (Conway kick)
- MSU - Gardner 32-yard field goal
- MSU - Greene 3-yard run (Gardner kick)

Third quarter

- PSU - Conway 42-yard field goal

Fourth quarter

- MSU - Greene 16-yard run (Gardner kick)
- PSU - Engram 53-yard pass from Richardson (Conway kick)
- MSU - Gardner 28-yard field goal
- PSU - Engram 4-yard pass from Richardson (Conway kick)

=== 1995 Independence Bowl ===
Michigan State Spartans vs. LSU Tigers

Quarter	1	2	3	4	Total
Michigan State	7	17	0	2	26
LSU	7	14	21	3	45

at Independence Stadium, Shreveport, Louisiana

- Date: December 29, 1995
- Game attendance: 48,835
- Box Score

Game information

First quarter

- MSU - Muhammad 78 pass from Banks (C Gardner kick)
- LSU - Cleveland 6 run (A Lafleur kick)

Second quarter

- MSU - S Greene 3 run (kick failed)
- LSU - Kennison 92 kickoff return (A Lafleur kick)
- MSU - Mason 100 kickoff return (S Greene run for two-point conversion)
- LSU - Faulk 51 run (A Lafleur kick)
- MSU - FG C Gardner 37

Third quarter

- LSU - Faulk 5 run (A Lafleur kick)
- LSU - Northern 37 fumble return (A Lafleur kick)
- LSU - Kennison 47 pass from Tyler (A Lafleur kick)

Fourth quarter

- LSU - FG Richey 48
- MSU - Safety, Kessler tackled in end zone

Rushing

- LSU - Faulk 25-234-2, Cleveland 13-23-1, Toomer 4-13-0, Kennison 1-6-0, Tyler 4-(-1)-0, Kessler 1--3-0
- MSU - Renaud 16-79-0, Greene 8-48-1, Crenshaw 1-1-0, Banks 10--28-0

Passing

- LSU - Tyler 10-20-1-164 1TD
- MSU - Banks 22-44-3-348 1TD

Receiving

- LSU - Kennison 5-124-1, LaFleur 2-31-0, Toomer 1-9-0, Cleveland 1-(-4)-0, Faulk 1-4-0
- MSU - Muhammed 9-171-1, Mason 6-74-0, Renaud 2-47-0, Carter 2-16-0, Outlaw 2-24-0, Keur 1-16-0

Punting

- LSU - Kessler 4 punts, 44.5 yard avg.
- MSU - Salani 6 punts, 37.5 yard avg.

== Roster ==
1995 Michigan State Spartans football team roster
Players
Coaches
Offense

Pos.	#	Name	Class
OT	76	Flozell Adams	So
QB	12	Tony Banks	Sr
C	52	Matt Beard	Jr
WR	81	Nigea Carter	Jr
FB	47	Scott Greene	Sr
TE	83	Josh Keur	So
WR	80	Derrick Mason	Jr
WR	1	Muhsin Muhammad	Sr
QB	9	Todd Schultz	So
G	73	Scott Shaw	So

Defense

Pos.	#	Name	Class
CB	3	Amp Campbell	Fr
S	49	Scott Ernsberger	Fr
LB	22	Reggie Garnett	Jr
CB	36	Aldi Henry	Jr
CB	10	Ray Hill	So
LB	44	Ike Reese	So
DT	96	Chris Smith	Jr
DE	94	Jabbar Threats	Jr
DT	91	Dimitrius Underwood	Fr

Special teams

Pos.	#	Name	Class

Head coach

- Nick Saban

Coordinators/assistant coaches

- Gary Tranquill – Offensive coordinator/quarterbacks coach
- Bobby Williams – Running backs coach
- Charlie Baggett – Wide receivers coach
- Jim Bollman – Offensive line coach
- Dean Pees – Defensive coordinator/inside linebackers coach
- Mark Dantonio – Defensive back coach
- Pat Shurmur – Special teams coach
- Brad Salem – Graduate assistant
- Mike Vorkapich – Graduate assistant
- Glenn Pires – Assistant
- Greg Colby – Assistant

Legend

- (C) Team captain
- (S) Suspended
- (I) Ineligible
- Injured
- Redshirt

== 1996 NFL draft ==
The following players were selected in the 1996 NFL draft.

Player	Round	Pick	Position	NFL team
Tony Banks	2	42	Quarterback	St. Louis Rams
Muhsin Muhammad	2	43	Wide receiver	Carolina Panthers
Scott Greene	6	193	Running back	Carolina Panthers
