= Chris Sedoris =

American football player (born 1973)

No. 59
- Position: Center

Personal information
- Born: April 25, 1973 (age 53); Columbus, Indiana, U.S.
- Listed height: 6 ft 3 in (1.91 m)
- Listed weight: 286 lb (130 kg)

Career information
- High school: St. Xavier (Louisville, Kentucky)
- College: Purdue
- NFL draft: 1996: undrafted

Career history
- Washington Redskins (1996)

Career NFL statistics
- Games played: 9
- Stats at Pro Football Reference

Christopher Jude Sedoris (born April 25, 1973) is an American former professional football player who was a center for the Washington Redskins of the National Football League (NFL). He played college football for the Purdue Boilermakers.
