= John Reeves (American football) =

American football player (born 1975)

No. 52
- Position: Linebacker

Personal information
- Born: February 23, 1975 (age 51); Bradenton, Florida, U.S.

Career information
- High school: Southeast (Bradenton)
- College: Purdue
- NFL draft: 1999: undrafted

Career history
- San Diego Chargers (1999–2000); Carolina Panthers (2001)*
- * Offseason or practice squad member only

Career NFL statistics
- Tackles: 10
- Stats at Pro Football Reference

John Reeves (born February 23, 1975) is an American former professional football player who was a linebacker in the National Football League (NFL). He played college football for the Purdue Boilermakers.

== Early life ==
Reeves was born and grew up in Bradenton, Florida, and attended Southeast High School, where he played football alongside NFL wide receiver Peter Warrick. As a senior, he led the Seminoles to a perfect record and a Class 4A state championship and broke the school's record for touchdown passes in a season.

== College career ==
Reeves had to sit out his freshman season due to academic issues. As a sophomore, he played in six games at quarterback and completed 26 of 57 passes for 285 yards with one touchdown and six interceptions. Reeves missed most of the following spring practice due to spinal meningitis, but eventually worked his way to becoming the Boilermakers' starting quarterback in the middle of the season before losing the starting job to Billy Dicken. Reeves finished the season with 772 yards with six touchdowns and five interceptions on 51 of 102 passing.

Reeves moved to defensive back going into his senior season and played the position in all 12 of Purdue's games. Reeves also had to take extra classes in order to graduate in four years and earn an extra year of eligibility. In his fifth year Reeves played linebacker.

== Professional career ==
Reeves was signed by the San Diego Chargers as an undrafted free agent in 1999. He spent two seasons with the Chargers, playing in 14 total games.
