= Jason Maniecki =

Polish gridiron football player (born 1972)

No. 90
- Position: Defensive tackle

Personal information
- Born: August 15, 1972 (age 54); Rabka-Zdrój, Poland
- Listed height: 6 ft 4 in (1.93 m)
- Listed weight: 291 lb (132 kg)

Career information
- High school: Wisconsin Dells (Wisconsin Dells, Wisconsin, U.S.)
- College: Wisconsin
- NFL draft: 1996: 5th round, 140th overall pick

Career history
- Tampa Bay Buccaneers (1996–1998)

Awards and highlights
- 2× Second-team All-Big Ten (1994, 1995)

Career NFL statistics
- Tackles: 4
- Sacks: 1
- Fumble recoveries: 1
- Stats at Pro Football Reference

Jason Zbigniew Maniecki (born August 15, 1972) is a former defensive tackle in the National Football League (NFL) who played three seasons with the Tampa Bay Buccaneers.

== NFL career ==
Maniecki was selected by the Buccaneers in the fifth round of the 1996 NFL draft, serving as a backup on the defensive line for part of three seasons. His first and only sack in the NFL came during a 1997 game against the Atlanta Falcons. During the 1999 pre-season, Maniecki was injured and waived by the Buccaneers as part of an injury settlement.

== After football ==
Maniecki is now the president of All Pro Realty Network at Keller Williams Realty.
