= Dimitrious Stanley =

American football player (1974–2023)

Dimitrious Stanley (September 19, 1974 – February 9, 2023) was an American professional football wide receiver. He played in the Arena Football League for the New Jersey Red Dogs. He was born in Worthington, Ohio. He played college football for the Ohio State Buckeyes. He also played in the Canadian Football League for the Winnipeg Blue Bombers.

Stanley ran unsuccessfully for Columbus City Council in 2015.

Stanley was diagnosed with prostate cancer in September 2019, and died from the disease on February 9, 2023, at the age of 48.
