= Ty Howard =

American football player (born 1973)

No. 29, 27, 20, 24
- Position: Cornerback

Personal information
- Born: November 30, 1973 (age 52); Columbus, Ohio, U.S.
- Listed height: 5 ft 9 in (1.75 m)
- Listed weight: 185 lb (84 kg)

Career information
- High school: Briggs (Columbus)
- College: Ohio State
- NFL draft: 1997: 3rd round, 84th overall pick

Career history
- Arizona Cardinals (1997–1998); Cincinnati Bengals (1999); Tennessee Titans (2000)

Career NFL statistics
- Tackles: 73
- Sacks: 1
- Passes defended: 4
- Stats at Pro Football Reference

Ty L. Howard (born November 30, 1973) is an American former professional football player who was a cornerback in the National Football League (NFL). He was selected in the third round of the 1997 NFL draft with the 84th overall pick. He played four seasons for the Arizona Cardinals (1997–1998), the Cincinnati Bengals (1999), and Tennessee Titans (2000).
