= Carl McCullough =

American football player (born 1973)

No. 13
- Position: Running back

Personal information
- Born: November 14, 1973 (age 52); St. Paul, Minnesota
- Listed height: 6 ft 1 in (1.85 m)
- Listed weight: 226 lb (103 kg)

Career information
- High school: Cretin-Derham Hall (Saint Paul, Minnesota)
- College: Wisconsin
- NFL draft: 1998: undrafted

Career history
- Buffalo Bills (1998)*; Minnesota Vikings (1999)*; Berlin Thunder (2000); Rhein Fire (2000)
- * Offseason or practice squad member only

Carl McCullough (born November 14, 1973) is an American former football running back. He played college football at the University of Wisconsin–Madison. He played for the Badgers during the 1993, 1995, 1996, and 1997 seasons. During his college career, he wore jersey #13. He was a regular starter in 1995 and 1996 over Aaron Stecker, before being replaced by future Heisman Trophy winner, Ron Dayne in 1997. He was not selected in the National Football League Draft. In 2000, McCullough played professionally for the Berlin Thunder and the Rhein Fire of NFL Europe. In 10 games he rushed 11 times for 34 yards.

== College statistics ==
- Career rushing: 469 Att, 2111 Yds, 4.5 Avg, 9 TD
- Career kick returns: 4 Ret, 65 Yds, 16.3 Avg, 0 TD
- Career passing: 0 Cmp, 1 Att, 0 Yds, 0 TD
