= Rickey Dudley =

American football player (born 1972)

No. 83, 82, 88
- Position: Tight end

Personal information
- Born: July 15, 1972 (age 54); Henderson, Texas, U.S.
- Listed height: 6 ft 7 in (2.01 m)
- Listed weight: 255 lb (116 kg)

Career information
- High school: Henderson (TX); Fork Union Military Academy (VA)
- College: Ohio State
- NFL draft: 1996: 1st round, 9th overall pick

Career history
- Oakland Raiders (1996–2000); Cleveland Browns (2001); Tampa Bay Buccaneers (2002–2004); Oakland Raiders (2005)*
- * Offseason or practice squad member only

Awards and highlights
- Super Bowl champion (XXXVII); First-team All-Big Ten (1995)

Career NFL statistics
- Receptions: 221
- Receiving yards: 3,024
- Receiving touchdowns: 33
- Stats at Pro Football Reference

Rickey Deshun Dudley (born July 15, 1972) is an American former professional football player in the National Football League (NFL). A 6'6", 252-lb. tight end from Ohio State University (where he played basketball before playing football), Dudley was selected by the Oakland Raiders in the first round (ninth overall) of the 1996 NFL draft. He played in nine seasons in the National Football League (NFL) from 1996 to 2004 for the Raiders, the Cleveland Browns, and the Tampa Bay Buccaneers, where he won Super Bowl XXXVII. A thumb injury that required surgery ended his career after the 2004 season.

== NFL career statistics ==
Legend
	Won the Super Bowl
**Bold**	Career high

=== Regular season ===
Year	Team	Games		Receiving					
Year	Team	GP	GS	Tgt	Rec	Yds	Avg	Lng	TD
1996	OAK	16	15	70	34	386	11.4	62	4
1997	OAK	16	16	**91**	**48**	**787**	**16.4**	**76**	7
1998	OAK	16	15	77	36	549	15.3	32	5
1999	OAK	16	16	59	39	555	14.2	35	**9**
2000	OAK	16	16	49	29	350	12.1	30	4
2001	CLE	4	4	16	9	115	12.8	27	0
2002	TAM	14	3	26	16	192	12.0	35	3
2003	TAM	7	2	11	7	42	6.0	9	1
2004	TAM	3	0	4	3	48	16.0	24	0
Career		108	87	403	221	3,024	13.7	76	33

=== Playoffs ===
Year	Team	Games		Receiving					
Year	Team	GP	GS	Tgt	Rec	Yds	Avg	Lng	TD
2000	OAK	2	2	**5**	1	7	7.0	7	0
2002	TAM	3	1	**5**	**2**	**19**	**9.5**	**12**	**1**
Career		5	3	10	3	26	8.7	12	1
