= Greg Bellisari =

American football player (born 1975)

No. 52
- Position: Linebacker

Personal information
- Born: June 21, 1975 (age 51); Boynton Beach, Florida, U.S.
- Listed height: 6 ft 0 in (1.83 m)
- Listed weight: 236 lb (107 kg)

Career information
- High school: Boca Raton (FL)
- College: Ohio State
- NFL draft: 1997: undrafted

Career history
- Tampa Bay Buccaneers (1997–1998); Oakland Raiders (1999)*
- * Offseason or practice squad member only

Awards and highlights
- 2× Second-team All-Big Ten (1995, 1996)
- Stats at Pro Football Reference

Greg Ernest Bellisari (born June 21, 1975) is an American former professional football player who was a linebacker for the Tampa Bay Buccaneers of the National Football League (NFL). He played college football for the Ohio State Buckeyes.

Oldest brother Greg was a linebacker and Captain at Ohio State while his younger brother Steve Bellisari was a quarterback at Ohio State.

Greg graduated from the Ohio State University College of Medicine in 2005 and now practices as an orthopedic surgeon.
