= Bobby Hoying =

American football player (born 1972)

No. 7, 14
- Position: Quarterback

Personal information
- Born: September 20, 1972 (age 54); St. Henry, Ohio, U.S.
- Listed height: 6 ft 3 in (1.91 m)
- Listed weight: 220 lb (100 kg)

Career information
- High school: St. Henry
- College: Ohio State
- NFL draft: 1996: 3rd round, 85th overall pick

Career history
- Philadelphia Eagles (1996–1998); Oakland Raiders (1999–2001)

Awards and highlights
- Draddy Trophy (1995); First-team All-Big Ten (1995); Ohio State Varsity Hall of Fame

Career NFL statistics
- Passing attempts: 456
- Passing completions: 244
- Completion percentage: 53.5%
- TD–INT: 11–15
- Passing yards: 2,544
- Passer rating: 64.3
- Stats at Pro Football Reference

Robert Carl Hoying (born September 20, 1972) is an American former professional football player who was a quarterback in the National Football League (NFL). He played college football for the Ohio State Buckeyes. He was selected in the third round of the 1996 NFL draft. He is the grandson of baseball player Wally Post, who played 15 years in the Major Leagues. Post was an outfielder for the Cincinnati Reds 1961 National League pennant winning team.

== Early life ==
Hoying grew up in Mercer County, Ohio, attending St. Henry High School, where he won one football and two basketball state championships. He had college basketball offers from the University of Toledo and other colleges.

== College career ==
Hoying played college football for the Ohio State Buckeyes. In 1993 as a sophomore he was named starting quarterback, but shared snaps with Bret Powers a transfer from Arizona State. By 1994, Hoying acquired a firm hold on the starting spot.

In his career at Ohio State Hoying completed 498 passes and 57 touchdown passes, both school records. He is third behind J. T. Barrett and Art Schlichter on the Ohio State career passing yardage list. He was an outstanding college student and was selected as an All Big 10 Scholar Athlete.

Hoying was selected to the Ohio State Varsity O Hall of Fame in 2008.

=== Career passing statistics ===
Year	Att.	Comp.	Pct.	Yards	TD	INT
1992	14	8	57.1	58	1	1
1993	202	109	54.0	1,570	8	8
1994	301	170	56.5	2,335	19	14
1995	341	211	61.9	3,269	29	12

== Professional career ==
Pre-draft measurables
Height	Weight	Arm length	Hand span	40-yard dash	10-yard split	20-yard split	20-yard shuttle	Vertical jump
6 ft 3 1/4 in (1.91 m)	221 lb (100 kg)	33 1/4 in (0.84 m)	9 5/8 in (0.24 m)	4.73 s	1.62 s	2.74 s	4.16 s	31.0 in (0.79 m)
All values from NFL Combine

Hoying was drafted in the third round of the 1996 NFL draft with the 85th overall pick by the Philadelphia Eagles. Hoying played well in two games in 1997 after taking over the starting role at midseason and throwing 11 touchdown passes. He won a memorable 44–42 shootout win over Boomer Esiason and the Cincinnati Bengals after throwing four touchdown passes.

The following year however, would be a complete disaster for Hoying as he was benched midseason after not winning a single game as a starter. He did not throw a touchdown pass and threw nine interceptions. The 3–13 season led to the firing of Eagles head coach Ray Rhodes and ultimately the hiring of Andy Reid. Reid drafted Donovan McNabb out of Syracuse and Hoying was traded to the Oakland Raiders in August 1999, rejoining coach Jon Gruden who had been the offensive coordinator for the Eagles under Rhodes. Hoying served as a backup to Rich Gannon in his first season with Oakland. In 2000 Hoying would play in the AFC Championship Game against the Baltimore Ravens standing in for the injured Gannon, but his team lost the game 16-3. Hoying retired after the 2001 season following a severe elbow injury. He holds the NFL record for most pass completions in a season without a touchdown.

Since leaving professional football Hoying has become a principal at Crawford Hoying, a full-service real estate company based in Columbus, Ohio.
