= List of Big Ten Conference football standings =

List of Big Ten Conference football standings may refer to:

- List of Big Ten Conference football standings (1896–1958)
- List of Big Ten Conference football standings (1959–present)
