= 1995 Iowa Hawkeyes football team =

American college football season

1995 Iowa Hawkeyes football

Sun Bowl champion

Sun Bowl, W 38–18 vs. Washington
- Conference: Big Ten Conference

Ranking
- Coaches: No. 22
- AP: No. 25
- Record: 8–4 (4–4 Big Ten)
- Head coach: Hayden Fry (17th season)
- Offensive coordinator: Don Patterson (4th season)
- Offensive scheme: Pro-style
- Defensive coordinator: Bill Brashier (17th season)
- Base defense: 5–2
- MVPs: Bob Diaco; Sedrick Shaw; Casey Wiegmann
- Captains: Lloyd Bickham; Chris Jackson; Matt Purdy; Casey Wiegmann
- Home stadium: Kinnick Stadium

1995 Big Ten Conference football standings
	Conf.					Overall
Team	W		L		T	W		L		T
No. 8 Northwestern $	8	–	0	–	0	10	–	2	–	0
No. 6 Ohio State	7	–	1	–	0	11	–	2	–	0
No. 13 Penn State	5	–	3	–	0	9	–	3	–	0
No. 17 Michigan	5	–	3	–	0	9	–	4	–	0
Michigan State	4	–	3	–	1	6	–	5	–	1
No. 25 Iowa	4	–	4	–	0	8	–	4	–	0
Illinois	3	–	4	–	1	5	–	5	–	1
Wisconsin	3	–	4	–	1	4	–	5	–	2
Purdue	2	–	5	–	1	4	–	6	–	1
Minnesota	1	–	7	–	0	3	–	8	–	0
Indiana	0	–	8	–	0	2	–	9	–	0
$ – Conference champion; Rankings from AP Poll

The 1995 Iowa Hawkeyes football team represented the University of Iowa as a member of the Big Ten Conference during the 1995 NCAA Division I-A football season. Led by 17th-year head coach Hayden Fry, the Hawkeyes compiled an overall record of 8–4 with a mark of 4–4 in conference play, placing sixth in the Big Ten. Iowa was invited to the Sun Bowl, where the Hawkeyes defeated Washington. The team played home games at Kinnick Stadium in Iowa City, Iowa.

== Schedule ==
Date	Time	Opponent	Rank	Site	TV	Result	Attendance	Source
September 9	1:00 pm	Northern Iowa*		Kinnick Stadium; Iowa City, IA		W 34–13	70,397	
September 16	11:00 am	at Iowa State*		Cyclone Stadium; Ames, IA (rivalry)		W 27–10	49,714	
September 30	1:00 pm	New Mexico State*		Kinnick Stadium; Iowa City, IA		W 59–21	63,721	
October 7	11:00 am	at Michigan State		Spartan Stadium; East Lansing, MI	Creative	W 21–7	73,732	
October 14	11:00 am	Indiana^{†}	No. 23	Kinnick Stadium; Iowa City, IA	ESPN2	W 22–13	69,520	
October 21	2:30 pm	No. 19 Penn State	No. 18	Kinnick Stadium; Iowa City, IA	ABC	L 27–41	70,397	
October 28	11:30 am	at No. 4 Ohio State	No. 25	Ohio Stadium; Columbus, OH	ESPN	L 35–56	93,314	
November 4	11:30 am	Illinois		Kinnick Stadium; Iowa City, IA	ESPN	L 7–26	70,397	
November 11	11:00 am	at No. 5 Northwestern		Dyche Stadium; Evanston, IL (College GameDay)	Creative	L 20–31	49,256	
November 18	11:30 am	at Wisconsin		Camp Randall Stadium; Madison, WI (rivalry)	ESPN2	W 33–20	78,907	
November 25	1:00 pm	Minnesota		Kinnick Stadium; Iowa City, IA (rivalry)		W 45–3	65,794	
December 29	1:30 pm	vs. No. 20 Washington*		Sun Bowl; El Paso, TX (Sun Bowl)	CBS	W 38–18	49,116	
*Non-conference game; ^{†}Homecoming; Rankings from AP Poll released prior to the game; All times are in Central time; Source:

== Rankings ==
Ranking movements Legend: ██ Increase in ranking ██ Decrease in ranking — = Not ranked RV = Received votes
	Week																
Poll	Pre	1	2	3	4	5	6	7	8	9	10	11	12	13	14	15	Final
AP			RV	RV	RV	RV	RV	23	18	25	RV		—				25
Coaches			RV	RV	RV	RV	RV	22	17	23	RV	RV					22

== Game summaries ==
=== Northern Iowa ===
UNI Panthers at Iowa Hawkeyes

Quarter	1	2	3	4	Total
Northern Iowa	3	0	3	7	13
Iowa	7	21	0	6	34

at Kinnick Stadium, Iowa City, Iowa

- Date: September 9, 1995
- Game time: 1:00 p.m. EST
- Game attendance: 70,397
- Box Score

Game information
First quarter
- UNI - FG Waller 38
- IOWA - Dwight 9 run (Hurley kick)

Second quarter

- IOWA - Atkins 31 interception return (Hurley kick)
- IOWA - Filer 1 run (Hurley kick)
- IOWA - Dwight 22 pass from Sherman (Hurley kick)

Third quarter

- UNI - FG Waller 44

Fourth quarter

- IOWA - Shaw 2 run (kick failed)
- UNI - Ward 30 pass from Berg (Waller kick)

=== Iowa State ===
Iowa Hawkeyes at Iowa State Cyclones

Quarter	1	2	3	4	Total
Iowa	6	6	6	9	27
Iowa State	7	3	0	0	10

at Jack Trice Stadium, Ames, Iowa

- Date: September 16, 1995
- Game time: 11:00 a.m. CST
- Game attendance: 49,714
- Box score and Game recap

Game information
First quarter
- IOWA - S Shaw 1 run (kick failed)
- ISU - Davis 63 run (Kohl kick)

Second quarter

- ISU - FG Kohl 26
- IOWA - Filer 1 run (two-point conversion failed)

Third quarter

- IOWA - Banks 5 run (kick failed)

Fourth quarter

- IOWA - FG Romano 25
- IOWA - Sherman 1 run (kick failed)

=== New Mexico State ===
New Mexico State Aggies at Iowa Hawkeyes

Quarter	1	2	3	4	Total
New Mexico State	0	0	14	7	21
Iowa	14	28	14	3	59

at Kinnick Stadium, Iowa City, Iowa

- Date: September 30, 1995
- Game time: 1:00 p.m. EST
- Game attendance: 63,721
- Box Score

Game information
First quarter
- IOWA - Shaw 3 run (Bromert kick)
- IOWA - Dwight 25 pass from Sherman (Bromert kick)

Second quarter

- IOWA - Banks 3 run (Bromert kick)
- IOWA - Filer 1 run (Bromert kick)
- IOWA - Burger 10 pass from Sherman (Bromert kick)
- IOWA - Dwight 21 pass from Sherman (Bromert kick)

Third quarter

- NMSU - Davis 26 pass from Ledbetter (Culin kick)
- IOWA - Shaw 7 run (Bromert kick)
- IOWA - Atikins 23 interception return (Bromert kick)
- NMSU - Gregory 21 pass from Ledbetter (Culin kick)

Fourth quarter

- IOWA - FG Bromert 29
- NMSU - Sanchez 4 pass from Ledbetter (Culin kick)

=== Michigan State ===
Led by tailback Sedrick Shaw (42 carries, 250 yards, TD), the Hawkeyes rolled up 524 yards of total offense (311 rushing) to earn a road victory over the Spartans in the 1995 Big Ten opener.

Iowa Hawkeyes at Michigan State Spartans

Quarter	1	2	3	4	Total
Iowa	0	6	8	7	21
Michigan State	0	7	0	0	7

at Spartan Stadium, East Lansing, Michigan

- Date: October 7, 1995
- Game time: 12:00 p.m. EST
- Game attendance: 73,732
- Box score and Game recap

Game information
First quarter
- No scoring

Second quarter

- IOWA - Bromert 37-yard field goal
- MSU - S Greene 2-yard run (C Gardner kick)
- IOWA - Hurley 50-yard field goal

Third quarter

- IOWA - Dwight 11-yard pass from Sherman (S Shaw reception for two-point conversion)

Fourth quarter

- IOWA - S Shaw 7-yard run (Bromert kick)

=== Indiana ===
Indiana Hoosiers at Iowa Hawkeyes

Quarter	1	2	3	4	Total
Indiana	0	10	0	3	13
Iowa	7	0	7	8	22

at Kinnick Stadium, Iowa City, Iowa

- Date: October 14, 1995
- Game time: 11:00 a.m. EST
- Game attendance: 69,520
- Box Score

Game information
First quarter
- IOWA - Dwight 56-yard run (Bromert kick)

Second quarter

- IND - Glover 1-yard run (Manolopoulos kick)
- IND - Manolopoulos 34-yard field goal

Third quarter

- IOWA - Shaw 7 yard run (Bromert kick)
- IND - Manolopoulos 23-yard field goal

Fourth quarter

- IOWA - Knight 60-yard interception return (Driscoll run)

=== Penn State ===
The Hawkeyes led 27-24 after a 19-yard touchdown run from Sedrick Shaw early in the 4th quarter, but Penn State rallied to score the final 17 points of the game.

#19 Penn State Nittany Lions at #18 Iowa Hawkeyes

Quarter	1	2	3	4	Total
Penn State	10	7	7	17	41
Iowa	7	7	6	7	27

at Kinnick Stadium, Iowa City, Iowa

- Date: October 21, 1995
- Game time: 2:30 p.m. CST
- Game attendance: 70,397
- TV announcers (ABC): Keith Jackson, Bob Griese, and Lynn Swann
- Box score and Game recap

Game information
First quarter
- PSU - Witman 1 run (Conway kick)
- IOWA - Odems 18 pass from Sherman (Bromert kick)
- PSU - FG Conway 42

Second quarter

- PSU - Witman 1 run (Conway kick)
- IOWA - Dwight 29 pass from Sherman (Bromert kick)

Third quarter

- IOWA - FG Bromert 22
- PSU - Witman 1 run (Conway kick)
- IOWA - FG Bromert 26

Fourth quarter

- IOWA - S Shaw 19 run (Bromert kick)
- PSU - FG Conway 26
- PSU - Engram 13 pass from Richardson (Conway kick)
- PSU - Engram 43 pass from Richardson (Conway kick)

=== Ohio State ===
The Buckeyes, led by future NFL Pro Bowl selections Eddie George, Terry Glenn, and Shawn Springs, rolled to a 56-0 lead in the first half before cruising to the 21-point victory.

#25 Iowa Hawkeyes at #4 Ohio State Buckeyes

Quarter	1	2	3	4	Total
Iowa	0	7	7	21	35
Ohio State	28	28	0	0	56

at Ohio Stadium, Columbus, Ohio

- Date: October 28, 1995
- Game time: 12:30 p.m.
- Game weather: Overcast, Some Rain 55 °F (13 °C), Wind SSE 10-20
- Game attendance: 93,314
- Referee: Jim Kemerling
- Box Score

Game information

First quarter

- OSU - Eddie George 3-yard run (Josh Jackson kick)
- OSU - Terry Glenn 38-yard pass from Bobby Hoying (Josh Jackson kick)
- OSU - Eddie George 9-yard run (Josh Jackson kick)
- OSU - Terry Glenn 56-yard pass from Bobby Hoying (Josh Jackson kick)

Second quarter

- OSU - Shawn Springs 60-yard interception return (Josh Jackson kick)
- OSU - Bobby Hoying 15-yard run (Josh Jackson kick)
- OSU - Eddie George 10-yard run (Josh Jackson kick)
- OSU - Eddie George 3-yard run (Josh Jackson kick)
- IOWA - Sedrick Shaw recovered fumble (Zach Bromert kick)

Third quarter

- IOWA - Sedrick Shaw 19-yard run (Zach Bromert kick)

Fourth quarter

- IOWA - Willie Guy 2-yard pass from Matt Sherman (Zach Bromert kick)
- IOWA - Tim Dwight 55-yard pass from Matt Sherman (Zach Bromert kick)
- IOWA - Sedrick Shaw 1-yard run (Zach Bromert kick)

Top Passers

- IOWA - Matt Sherman - 18/37, 334 yards, 2 TDs, 3 INTs
- OSU - Bobby Hoying - 8/16, 273 yards, 2 TDs

Top Rushers

- IOWA - Sedrick Shaw - 30 rushes, 111 yards, 3 TDs
- OSU - Eddie George - 15 rushes, 110 yards, 4 TDs

Top Receivers

- OSU - Terry Glenn - 3 receptions, 149 yards, 2 TDs
- IOWA - Demo Odems - 5 receptions, 110 yards

=== Illinois ===
Illinois Fighting Illini at Iowa Hawkeyes

Quarter	1	2	3	4	Total
Illinois	3	7	6	10	26
Iowa	0	7	0	0	7

at Kinnick Stadium, Iowa City, Iowa

- Date: November 4, 1995
- Game time: 11:30 a.m. CST
- Game attendance: 70,397
- TV: ESPN
- Box score and Game recap

Game information
First quarter
- ILL - Scheuplein 24-yard field goal ILL 3–0

Second quarter

- IOWA - Tim Dwight 12-yard pass from Matt Sherman (Bromert kick) IOWA 7–3
- ILL - Cushing 5-yard pass from Johnson (Scheuplein kick) ILL 10–7

Third quarter

- ILL - Havard 35-yard run (run failed) ILL 16–7'

Fourth quarter

- ILL - Scheuplein 19-yard field goal ILL 19–7
- ILL - Douthard 3-yard run (Scheuplein kick) ILL 26–7

=== Northwestern ===
ESPN's College GameDay was in Evanston for this matchup between the Hawkeyes and the #5 Wildcats. After leading 20-17 at halftime, Iowa couldn't muster a second half score. Northwestern had a magical season, capped by the school's first trip to the Rose Bowl in 46 years.

Iowa Hawkeyes at #5 Northwestern Wildcats

Quarter	1	2	3	4	Total
Iowa	0	20	0	0	20
Northwestern	3	14	7	7	31

at Dyche Stadium, Evanston, Illinois

- Date: November 11, 1995
- Game time: 11:30 a.m. CST
- Game attendance: 49,256
- TV announcers (Creative Sports): Wayne Larrivee, Randy Wright, and Jim Barber
- Box score and Game recap

Game information
First quarter
- NU - Brian Gowins 50-yard field goal

Second quarter

- IOWA - Sedrick Shaw 1-yard run (Bromert kick)
- IOWA - Tom Knight 28-yard interception return (Bromert kick)
- NU - Darren Drexler 21-yard pass from Steve Schnur (Gowins kick)
- NU - Brian Musso 60-yard punt return (Gowins kick)
- IOWA - Scott Slutzker 39-yard pass from Matt Sherman (kick failed)

Third quarter

- NU - Darnell Autry 3-yard run (Gowins kick)

Fourth quarter

- NU - Hudhaifa Ismaeli 31-yard fumble return (Gowins kick)

=== Wisconsin ===
Iowa Hawkeyes at Wisconsin Badgers

Quarter	1	2	3	4	Total
Iowa	7	17	0	9	33
Wisconsin	0	7	7	6	20

at Camp Randall Stadium, Madison, Wisconsin

- Date: November 18, 1995
- Game time: 11:30 a.m. CST
- Game weather: 34 °F (1 °C), Cloudy, Wind N 5–10 mph (8.0–16.1 km/h)
- Game attendance: 78,907
- Referee: Tom Quinn
- TV: ESPN2

Game information
First quarter
- IOWA - Michael Burger 3-yard pass from Matt Sherman (Bromert kick)

Second quarter

- IOWA - Sedrick Shaw 7-yard run (Bromert kick)
- IOWA - Sedrick Shaw 1-yard run (Bromert kick)
- WIS - London 45-yard pass from Darrell Bevell (Hall kick)
- IOWA - Brion Hurley 50-yard field goal

Third quarter

- WIS - Nyquist 1-yard pass from Bevell (Hall kick)

Fourth quarter

- WIS - Stecker 2-yard run (kick failed)
- IOWA - Safety, holding in end zone
- IOWA - Sedrick Shaw 4-yard run (Bromert kick)

=== Minnesota ===
Minnesota Golden Gophers at Iowa Hawkeyes

Quarter	1	2	3	4	Total
Minnesota	0	0	3	0	3
Iowa	7	10	7	21	45

at Kinnick Stadium, Iowa City, Iowa

- Date: November 25, 1995
- Game time: 1:05 pm CST
- Game weather: 45 °F (7 °C), Sunny, Wind W 10 mph (16 km/h)
- Game attendance: 65,794
- Referee: Jim Kemerling
- TV: ESPN
- Box score

Game information

First quarter

- IOWA - Tim Dwight 10-yard pass from Matt Sherman (Zach Bromert kick) IOWA 7–0

Second quarter

- IOWA - Dwight 14-yard pass from Sherman (Bromert kick) IOWA 14–0
- IOWA - Zach Bromert 25-yard field goal IOWA 17–0

Third quarter

- MINN - Chalberg 24-yard field goal IOWA 17–3
- IOWA - Shakoor 13-yard run (Bromert kick) IOWA 24–3

Fourth quarter

- IOWA - Michael Burger 2-yard run (Bromert kick) IOWA 31–3
- IOWA - Shakoor 2-yard run (Bromert kick) IOWA 38–3
- IOWA - Willock 17-yard pass from Ryan Driscoll (Bromert kick) IOWA 45–3

=== Sun Bowl ===
The young Hawkeyes bullied the Pac-10 co-Champion and 20th-ranked Huskies, leading 21–0 at half and 38–6 early in the 4th quarter before cruising to a 20-point victory. Sedrick Shaw and Tavian Banks each ran for over 100 yards, as Iowa outgained Washington 229–90 on the ground. Iowa kickers combined for 5 field goals to stretch the lead in the first half.

Iowa ended the season on a 3-game winning streak, earning a #25 ranking in the final AP poll and a #22 ranking in the final Coaches' poll.

This was the Hawkeyes' first win over a ranked opponent since the 1991 season, and Iowa's first bowl victory since the 1987 Holiday Bowl.

Coaching in his final game, longtime Defensive Coordinator Bill Brashier referred to this Sun Bowl victory as his most memorable.

Iowa Hawkeyes vs. #20 Washington Huskies

Quarter	1	2	3	4	Total
Iowa	10	11	10	7	38
Washington	0	0	6	12	18

at Sun Bowl, El Paso, Texas

- Date: December 29, 1995
- Game attendance: 49,116
- TV announcers (CBS): Jim Nantz, Terry Donahue, and Michele Tafoya

Game information
First quarter
- IOWA - Sedrick Shaw 58-yard run (Zach Bromert kick) IOWA 7–0
- IOWA - Brion Hurley 49-yard field goal IOWA 10–0

Second quarter

- IOWA - Safety IOWA 12–0
- IOWA - Zach Bromert 33-yard field goal IOWA 15–0
- IOWA - Zach Bromert 34-yard field goal IOWA 18–0
- IOWA - Brion Hurley 47-yard field goal IOWA 21–0

Third quarter

- IOWA - Brion Hurley 50-yard field goal IOWA 24–0
- WASH - Jerome Pathon 30-yard pass from Shane Fortney (two-point conversion failed) IOWA 24-6
- IOWA - Michael Burger 8-yard run (Zach Bromert kick) IOWA 31–6

Fourth quarter

- IOWA - Michael Burger 1-yard run (Zach Bromert kick) IOWA 38–6
- WASH - Fred Coleman 10-yard pass from Damon Huard (two-point conversion failed) IOWA 38–12
- WASH - Ernie Conwell 20-yard pass from Damon Huard (two-point conversion failed) IOWA 38–18

== Roster ==
1995 Iowa Hawkeyes football team roster
Players
Coaches
Offense

Pos.	#	Name	Class
RB	22	Tavian Banks	So
FB	85	Michael Burger	Fr
WR	4	Richard Carter	So
WR	6	Tim Dwight	So
TE	80	Zeron Flemister	Fr
WR	18	Damon Gibson	So
OL	79	Mike Goff	So
WR	1	Willie Guy	Sr
TE	81	Chris Knipper	So
WR	10	Demo Odems	Jr
RB	5	Sedrick Shaw	Jr
QB	12	Matt Sherman	So
TE	84	Scott Slutzker	Sr
OL	73	Ross Verba	Jr
C	70	Casey Wiegmann	Sr

Defense

Pos.	#	Name	Class
CB	23	Plez Atkins	So
SS	15	Kerry Cooks	So
DL	94	Jared DeVries	Fr
LB	45	Bobby Diaco	Sr
DE	9	Bill Ennis-Inge	Jr
CB	26	Ed Gibson	So
DE	28	Jason House	So
DB	8	Tom Knight	Jr
DB	3	Damien Robinson	Jr
LB	56	Vernon Rollins	Fr

Special teams

Pos.	#	Name	Class
K	38	Zach Bromert	Fr
P	46	Nick Gallery	Jr
K	20	Brion Hurley	Jr
K	17	Todd Romano	Sr

Head coach

- Hayden Fry

Coordinators/assistant coaches

- Don Patterson – Offensive Coordinator
- Bill Brashier – Defensive Coordinator
- Milan Vooletich – Defensive ends
- Chuck Long – Defensive backs
- Bret Bielema – Graduate Assistant

Legend

- (C) Team captain
- (S) Suspended
- (I) Ineligible
- Injured
- Redshirt

== Team players in the 1996 NFL draft ==
Player	Position	Round	Pick	NFL club
Scott Slutzker	Tight end	3	82	Indianapolis Colts
