= Sedrick Shaw =

American football player (born 1973)

No. 23, 25, 39, 22
- Position: Running back

Personal information
- Born: November 16, 1973 (age 52); Austin, Texas, U.S.
- Listed height: 6 ft 0 in (1.83 m)
- Listed weight: 214 lb (97 kg)

Career information
- High school: Lyndon B. Johnson (Austin)
- College: Iowa
- NFL draft: 1997: 3rd round, 61st overall pick

Career history
- New England Patriots (1997–1998); Cleveland Browns (1999); Cincinnati Bengals (1999); Saskatchewan Roughriders (2002–2003)

Awards and highlights
- First-team All-Big Ten (1996)

Career NFL statistics
- Rushing yards: 258
- Rushing average: 4.7
- Receptions: 9
- Receiving yards: 34
- Total touchdowns: 1
- Stats at Pro Football Reference

Sedrick Anton Shaw (born November 16, 1973) is an American former professional football player who was a running back in the National Football League (NFL) and Canadian Football League (CFL). He played college football for the Iowa Hawkeyes and was selected by the New England Patriots in the third round of the 1997 NFL draft. He played three seasons for the Patriots (1997–1998), Cincinnati Bengals (1999), Cleveland Browns (1999) and the Saskatchewan Roughriders (2002–2003).

== Early life ==
Shaw grew up in Austin, Texas and attended Lyndon B. Johnson High School. As a senior, Shaw rushed for 1,120 yards and 7 touchdowns.

== College career ==
Shaw attended the University of Iowa in Iowa City, Iowa, and played for head coach Hayden Fry. After redshirting, Shaw immediately made an impact in his first game by returning a kickoff 75 yards to set up a score and rushing for 38 yards. He finished his freshman season with 561 yards rushing and two touchdowns, and 115 yards receiving.

As a sophomore, Shaw eclipsed 1,000 yards rushing for the first of three times during his career. He averaged 5.9 yards per carry and, in the season opener against Central Michigan, delivered what would be his career long run of 80 yards. The Hawkeyes finished the 1994 season with a record of 5–5–1 and did not make a bowl game.

Shaw's junior season would be his best statistically with 1,477 yards rushing and 15 touchdowns. He ran for 100 yards or more in eight games, and set the single-season school record with 316 carries. On October 7, Shaw ran for a career-high 250 yards on 42 carries against Michigan State. A little more than a month later, he ran for 214 yards and 3 touchdowns in a win over Wisconsin. Shaw capped his junior season by rushing for 135 yards and a touchdown in the Sun Bowl to take home offensive MVP honors.

During Shaw's senior season, he ran for 1,116 yards and 8 touchdowns. In a season where the team went 9–3 (6–2 Big Ten, tied for 3rd) and finished No. 18 in the rankings, he was named First-team All-Big Ten and offensive MVP of the Alamo Bowl after running for 113 yards and a touchdown in a shutout victory over Texas Tech. Shaw became the first, and to date the only, Iowa football player to rush for over 4,000 yards in a career.

He held numerous single-season and career school rushing records at the end of his career. While some of his records have been surpassed (single-season rushing yards and rushing touchdowns), Shaw remains the school's career leader in rushing yards (4,156), rushing touchdowns (33, tied with Tavian Banks), and most career 100-yard games (19). He also tops the school's career list for all-purpose yards (5,043), and, along with Banks, is one of two non-kickers who are part of the top ten on the school's career list for scoring.

=== Statistics ===
Year	Team	G	Rushing					Receiving				
Year	Team	G	Att	Yards	Avg	Long	TD	Rec	Yards	Avg	Long	TD
1993	Iowa	12	127	561	4.4		2	14	115	8.2		0
1994	Iowa	11	170	1,002	5.9	80	7	7	100	14.3		1
1995	Iowa	12	316	1,477	4.7	58	15	15	138	9.2		0
1996	Iowa	11	224	1,116	5.0		9	13	78	6.0		1
Career		46	837	4,156	5.0	80	33	49	431	8.1	67	2

== Professional career ==
Pre-draft measurables
Height	Weight	Arm length	Hand span	40-yard dash	10-yard split	20-yard split	20-yard shuttle	Three-cone drill	Vertical jump
6 ft 0 in (1.83 m)	214 lb (97 kg)	33 in (0.84 m)	9 1/4 in (0.23 m)	4.62 s	1.64 s	2.77 s	4.39 s	7.76 s	32.0 in (0.81 m)

Shaw was drafted by the New England Patriots with the first pick of the third round (61st overall) of the 1997 NFL draft. After playing in just one game as a rookie, he saw action in 13 games (1 start) during the 1998 season.
