= 1995 Sun Bowl =

American college football game

- 62nd Sun Bowl
Iowa Hawkeyes	Washington Huskies
(7–4)	(7–3–1)
Big Ten	Pac-10
38	18
Head coach: Hayden Fry	Head coach: Jim Lambright
	AP / Coaches / BA; 20 / 20 / 20
	1	2	3	4	Total
Iowa	10	11	10	7	38
Washington	0	0	6	12	18
- Date: December 29, 1995
- Season: 1995
- Stadium: Sun Bowl
- Location: El Paso, Texas
- MVP: Offensive: Sedrick Shaw (Iowa), Defensive: Jared DeVries (Iowa), Special Teams: Brion Hurley (Iowa)
- Referee: Bud Alexander (SWC)
- Payout: US$900,000 per team

United States TV coverage
- Network: CBS
- Announcers: Jim Nantz and Terry Donahue

The 1995 Sun Bowl was a college football bowl game played on December 29, 1995 at the Sun Bowl in El Paso, Texas. The game featured the Iowa Hawkeyes from the Big Ten Conference and the Washington Huskies from the Pac-10 Conference. The Sun Bowl was one of the 1995–96 bowl games concluding the 1995 NCAA Division I-A football season.

After two straight bowl losses to Washington, in the 1982 Rose Bowl and the 1991 Rose Bowl, Iowa got a measure of revenge with the win.

== Teams ==
=== Iowa Hawkeyes ===
The Hawkeyes entered the game with a 7–4 record (4–4 in the Big Ten). They started the season with five wins and peaked with a No. 18 ranking. After losing four straight conference games, the team rebounded to finish sixth place in the Big Ten standings. Three of their four conference losses came to ranked teams.

This was Iowa's first appearance in the Sun Bowl.

=== Washington Huskies ===
The Huskies entered the game with a 7–3–1 record (6–1–1 in the Pac-10). They finished tied for first place in the Pac-10 standings with USC, a team they led 21–0 in the fourth quarter before the game ended in a 21–21 tie. USC was selected for the Rose Bowl by virtue of more non-conference victories than Washington. The Huskies entered the game ranked No. 20 in both major polls

This was Washington's third appearance in the Sun Bowl. They won the 1979 edition by beating Texas 14–7 and lost the 1986 game to Alabama 28–6.

== Game summary ==
Iowa scored first, after running back Sedrick Shaw rushed for a 58-yard touchdown, and a 7–0 Iowa lead. Kicker Brion Hurley added a 49-yard field goal, to make it 10–0 after one quarter of play.

In the second quarter, Iowa got a safety, increasing its lead to 12–0. Zach Bromert added a pair of 33 and 34-yard field goals, to push the lead to 18–0. Brion Hurley added a 47-yard field goal before half time to make the score 21–0 at the end of the half.

In the third quarter, Brion Hurley kicked a 50-yard field goal, to make the score 24–0. Washington finally got on the board after quarterback Shane Fortney threw a 30-yard touchdown pass to wide receiver Jerome Pathon to make it 24–6. Iowa's Michael Burger scored on a pair of touchdown runs to increase the lead to 38–6. Washington scored twice on touchdown passes by back-up quarterback Damon Huard to make the score more respectable.

1995 Sun Bowl

Quarter	1	2	3	4	Total
Iowa	10	11	10	7	38
No. 20 Washington	0	0	6	12	18

at Sun Bowl • El Paso, Texas

- Date: December 29, 1995
- Game weather: Sunny • Temperature: 56 °F (13 °C) • Wind: 12–15 mph (19–24 km/h) NNW
- Game attendance: 116
- Referee: Bud Alexander
- TV announcers (CBS): Jim Nantz and Terry Donahue
- Box score

Game information

First Quarter

- (13:08) Iowa – Sedrick Shaw 58-yard run (Zach Bromert kick) (Drive: 1 play, 58 yards, 0:09; Iowa 7–0)
- (8:39) Iowa – Brion Hurley 49-yard field goal (Drive: 7 plays, 26 yards, 4:12; Iowa 10–0)

Second Quarter

- (12:50) Iowa – Safety, Punt snapped out of the end zone (Iowa 12–0)
- (6:13) Iowa – Zach Bromert 33-yard field goal (Drive: 10 plays, 60 yards, 4:52; Iowa 15–0)
- (3:28) Iowa – Zach Bromert 34-yard field goal (Drive: 7 plays, 14 yards, 1:44; Iowa 18–0)
- (0:35) Iowa – Brion Hurley 47-yard field goal (Drive: 9 plays, 29 yards, 2:05; Iowa 21–0)

Third Quarter

- (11:19) Iowa – Brion Hurley 50-yard field goal (Drive: 7 plays, 13 yards, 3:20; Iowa 24–0)
- (8:37) UW – Jerome Pathon 30-yard pass from Shane Fortney (pass failed) (Drive: 10 plays, 80 yards, 2:42; Iowa 24–6)
- (7:27) Iowa – Michael Burger 8-yard run (Zach Bromert kick) (Drive: 3 plays, 80 yards, 1:10; Iowa 31–6)

Fourth Quarter

- (14:57) Iowa – Michael Burger 1-yard run (Zach Bromert kick) (Drive: 9 plays, 60 yards, 5:24; Iowa 38–6)
- (12:20) UW – Fred Coleman 3-yard pass from Damon Huard (pass failed) (Drive: 10 plays, 90 yards, 2:27; Iowa 38–12)
- (3:25) UW – Ernie Conwell 3-yard pass from Damon Huard (pass failed) (Drive: 7 plays, 80 yards, 2:14; Iowa 38–18)

=== Statistics ===
Statistics	Iowa	Washington
First downs	18	14
Plays–yards	76–421	66–346
Rushes–yards	50–286	29–96
Passing yards	135	250
Passing: comp–att–int	11–26–2	19–37–0
Time of possession	35:32	24:28

Team	Category	Player	Statistics
Iowa	Passing	Matt Sherman	11/24, 135 yards, INT
Iowa	Rushing	Sedrick Shaw	21 carries, 135 yards, TD
Iowa	Receiving	Scott Slutzker	4 receptions, 66 yards
Washington	Passing	Damon Huard	14/26, 194 yards, 2 TD
Washington	Rushing	Leon Neal	9 carries, 65 yards
Washington	Receiving	Ernie Conwell	4 receptions, 71 yards, TD
