= FRY Fest =

Annual University of Iowa event

FRYfest
- Dates: Friday prior to Iowa Hawkeye Football Season
- Locations: Iowa River Landing, Coralville, Iowa
- Years active: 2009–present
- Website: http://www.fryfest.com

FRYfest, “a Celebration of all that is Hawkeye,” is held annually in the Iowa City and Coralville area the Friday prior to the Iowa Hawkeye Football season.

FRYfest was created in 2009 as a collaborative effort between the Iowa City/Coralville Area Convention & Visitors Bureau, City of Coralville, and University of Iowa Athletics. Its purpose was to kick off the football season, draw visitors’ attention to the community, and improve the quality of life for residents of the Iowa City/Coralville Area. The event is named after Hayden Fry, who is credited with bringing the TigerHawk to the University of Iowa.

FRYfest is a one-day event held the Friday before the first home football game to kick off the Hawkeye athletic seasons. The event has had 20,000 attendees, many of whom travel to Coralville, Iowa each year to take part. The event also serves as a fundraiser for the City of Coralville, with proceeds of the concert and beverage garden going towards Coralville's Fourth of July Celebrations.

Its first six years honored Hayden Fry, Forest Evashevski, Dan Gable, the Iowa vs. ISU football rivalry, and the quarterbacks of the Hayden Fry era. Events included “The World’s Largest Hawkeye Tradeshow,” a tailgate and show and shine car show, autograph sessions with coaches and former athletes, a Hawkeye pep rally, outdoor concerts, and a fully staged, live production honoring Dan Gable. The festival also broke two Guinness World Records: one in 2010 for the Largest Hokey Pokey Dance with 7,384 participants, and the other in 2014 for the Longest Marathon Playing Cornhole (bags) for a continuous 26 hours, 12 minutes, and 44 seconds.

The 10th annual FRYfest, sponsored by MidWestOne Bank, was held on

August 31, 2018.

== History ==
The event is named after Hayden Fry, who is credited with bringing the Tigerhawk to the University of Iowa. Each year of the event has drawn thousands of attendees and has included events such as the World's Largest Hawkeye Tradeshow, a car show, autograph sessions with coaches and athletes, a pep rally, and an outdoor concert.

== Special events ==
=== Hayden Fry Way ===
During the inaugural FRYfest celebration, First Avenue (between I-80 and Hwy 6) in Coralville, Iowa, was co-named and publicly unveiled as Hayden Fry Way. The honor recognized Hayden Fry, the University of Iowa's winningest football coach. The road is the most traveled in Johnson County and serves as a route for fans traveling to Kinnick Stadium.

=== Forest Evashevski Drive ===
FRYfest 2010 began at Kinnick Stadium with a commemorative street renaming ceremony honoring Forest “Evy” Evashevski. Evashevski served as the Hawkeyes' head coach from 1952 to 1960, during which the team won Big 10 championships in 1956, 1958, and 1960, and two Rose Bowl titles in 1956 and 1958. Evashevski then served as Iowa's athletic director from 1960 until 1970.

=== Hokey Pokey ===
In its second year, FRYfest broke the Guinness World Record for the Largest Hokey Pokey dance with 7,384 participants on September 3, 2010. Event organizers had asked Hawkeye Nation to “shake it all about” to beat the existing record of 4,431 in Toronto, Canada. The connection to the Hawkeyes stemmed from the Hayden Fry era, when the coach and his teams performed the Hokey Pokey in the locker room after major victories during the 1980s and 1990s.

=== This is Your Life Dan Gable ===
In its third year, FRYfest honored wrestler and coach Dan Gable with a live version of the 1950s television program This is Your Life. The fully staged production presented his life and accomplishments, including documentary video and guests who recalled his collegiate career and two NCAA championships, his Olympic Gold Medal, and his coaching success at Iowa.

Surprise guests included Tom and Terry Brands, Jim Leach, Bump Elliott, and Hayden Fry, along with video messages from Frank Gifford and Lute Olson, among others.

=== Iowa vs. ISU ===
The fourth FRYfest celebration recognized the 35th anniversary of the renewed rivalry between the Iowa Hawkeyes and Iowa State Cyclones. The two teams faced off in 1977, the year the Cy-Hawk traveling trophy was introduced, for the first time since 1934. The Iowa and Iowa State ROTC programs commemorated the matchup in 2012 by running the game ball from Ames to Iowa City, handing it off at the halfway mark and ending at the FRYfest Pep Rally. Frank Fritz from the History Channel's ‘American Pickers’ was also one of the day's special guests.

=== Herky on Parade Meets FRYfest ===
The fifth FRYfest focused on the fans. The event introduced a Hawkeye Fashion Show/Product Showcase to display merchandise offered by vendors, and featured the unveiling of three designs for the Herky on Parade project, a 10th anniversary public art event launched the following May.

FRYfest VI celebrated the quarterbacks of the Hayden Fry era and featured a panel discussion with Chuck Long, Tom Grogan, Ryan Driscoll, and other quarterbacks, along with Hayden Fry himself. New additions included a Hawkeye Trivia competition and an outdoor Hawkeye bags tournament. The final farewell of Herky on Parade, where all 84 statues were brought together after a summer on the streets, also drew many families to the event.

=== Longest Marathon Cornhole Game ===
In 2014, FRYfest became the official Guinness World Records holder of the longest marathon playing cornhole. Four Hawkeye fans played cornhole (also known as bags) for 26 hours, 12 minutes, and 44 seconds straight, giving FRYfest its second Guinness World Record.

== Attractions and Entertainment ==
=== World’s Largest Licensed Hawkeye Tradeshow and Tailgate Party ===
FRYfest includes what organizers describe as the World's Largest Hawkeye Tradeshow and Tailgate Party. It features hundreds of Hawkeye retailers, current University of Iowa student athletes, coaches and media personalities, and the Hall of Fame Class. The 4th Annual FRYfest featured Hawkeye as well as Cyclone vendors showcasing their merchandise.

=== Car Show ===
The FRYfest Show & Shine is a car show open to all types of vehicles. Entry is free, and awards include Hayden Fry's Choice, Mayor's Choice, and Herky's Choice, among others. There is also a tailgate car category.

=== Autograph Sessions ===
Autograph sessions are scheduled throughout the day with current University of Iowa athletic teams, the Hall of Fame Class, and reunion groups particular to that year. At the 2012 FRYfest, Frank Fritz of American Pickers opened the Tradeshow with an autograph session.

=== Concerts ===
FRYfest concludes at the Iowa River Landing with an outdoor concert. Past artists have included Jake Owen, The Outlaws, Joan Jett & The Blackhearts, The Charlie Daniels Band, the Nadas, Three Dog Night, 8 Seconds, Josh Turner, Sara Evans, Lee Brice, Dustin Lynch, Chris Cagle, Craig Campbell, and David Nail.
