= 1996 Alamo Bowl =

1996 Builders Square Alamo Bowl
- Fourth edition
Texas Tech Red Raiders	Iowa Hawkeyes
(7–4)	(8–3)
Big 12	Big Ten
0	27
Head coach: Spike Dykes	Head coach: Hayden Fry
	AP / Coaches / BA; 21 / 21 / 21
	1	2	3	4	Total
Texas Tech	0	0	0	0	0
Iowa	6	11	0	10	27
- Date: December 29, 1996
- Season: 1996
- Stadium: Alamodome
- Location: San Antonio, Texas
- MVP: RB Sedrick Shaw (Iowa); DL Jared DeVries (Iowa); OT Shane Dunn (Texas Tech)
- Referee: Buddy Ward (Big East)

United States TV coverage
- Network: ESPN
- Announcers: Ron Franklin and Mike Gottfried

The 1996 Alamo Bowl featured the Texas Tech Red Raiders and the Iowa Hawkeyes.

== Background ==
Iowa was in their eighth week (non consecutive) of being ranked, with one highlight win being over #10 Penn State. Though they finished tied for 2nd in the Big Ten Conference, they were invited to their fifth bowl game in five years. In their first season in the Big 12 Conference following the fall of the Southwest Conference, the Red Raiders finished in 2nd place in the Southern Division, though they were invited to their fourth bowl game in three years.

== Game summary ==
- Iowa – Matt Sherman 1-yard touchdown run (rush failed) 11:21
- Iowa – Sedrick Shaw 20-yard touchdown run (Chris Knipper pass from Sherman) 5:30
- Iowa – Zach Bromert 36-yard field goal 0:00
- Iowa – Bromert 26-yard field goal 10:36
- Iowa – Rodney Filer 14-yard touchdown run (Bromert kick) 2:09

Iowa opened the scoring with a 1-yard touchdown run from quarterback Matt Sherman, opening up a 6–0 lead. In the second quarter, Sedrick Shaw rushed 20 yards for a touchdown. The ensuing two-point conversion attempt was successful, and Iowa built a 14–0 lead. Zach Bromert added field goals of 36 and 26 yards, as Iowa's lead ballooned to 20–0. In the fourth quarter, Rodney Filer scored on a 14-yard touchdown run to finalize the score.

The win was somewhat bittersweet for Iowa, as linebacker Mark Mitchell had lost his mother in a fatal car accident while she drove to San Antonio to attend what would be her son's final collegiate game. Therefore, as a symbolic gesture of mourning, the entire Iowa team stripped their helmets of all markings, the game ball was also given to Mitchell. Sedrick Shaw rushed 113 yards on 20 carries as the Red Raiders were held scoreless for the first time since 1987.

== Statistics ==
Statistics	Texas Tech	Iowa
First downs	13	23
Rushing yards	61	217
Passing yards	145	139
Total offense	206	356
Passing	14–32–1	10–17–0
Punts–average	6–45.8	5–52.0
Return yards	-2	32
Fumbles–lost	0–0	0–0
Penalties–yards	7–68	8–78
