= Hayden Fry =

American football player and coach (1929–2019)

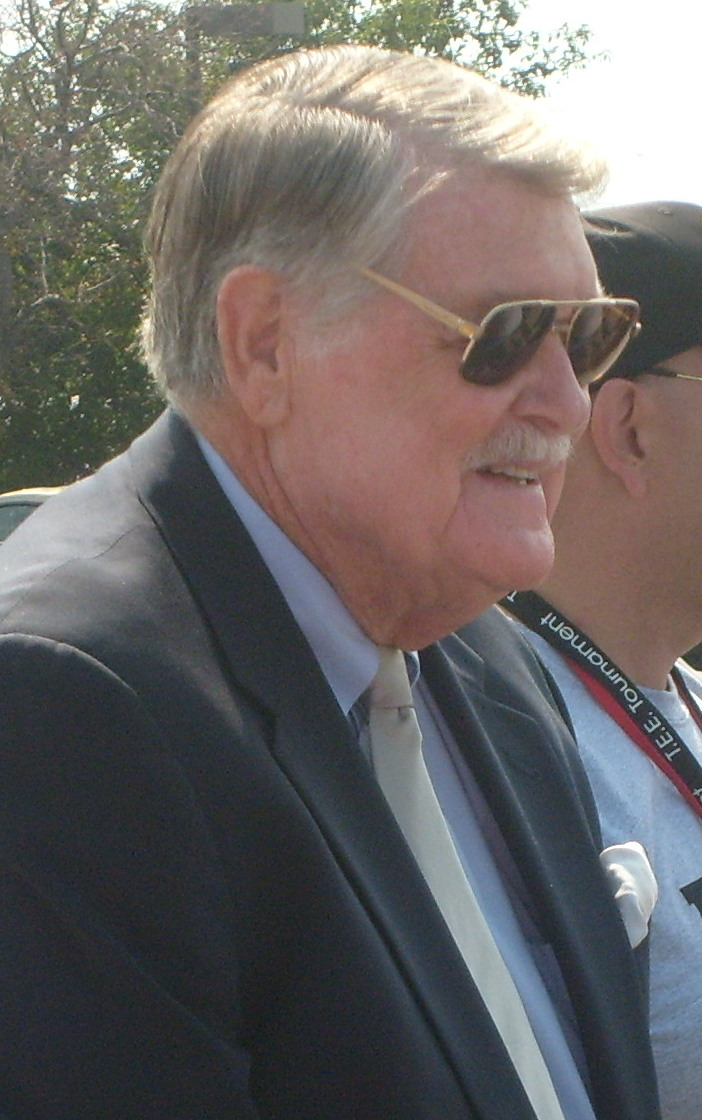
- Fry at FRY Fest, 2009

Biographical details
- Born: February 28, 1929; Eastland, Texas, U.S.
- Died: December 17, 2019 (aged 90); Dallas, Texas, U.S.

Playing career
- 1947–1950: Baylor
- 1953: Quantico Marines
- Position: Quarterback

Coaching career (HC unless noted)
- 1956–1958: Odessa HS (TX)
- 1959–1960: Baylor (DB)
- 1961: Arkansas (QB/RB)
- 1962–1972: SMU
- 1973–1978: North Texas State
- 1979–1998: Iowa

Administrative career (AD unless noted)
- 1964–1972: SMU
- 1973–1978: North Texas State

Head coaching record
- Overall: 232–178–10 (college)
- Bowls: 7–9–1

Accomplishments and honors

Championships
- 1 SWC (1966); 1 MVC (1973); 3 Big Ten (1981, 1985, 1990)

Awards
- Sporting News College Football COY (1981); Amos Alonzo Stagg Award (2005); 2× SWC Coach of the Year (1963, 1966); MVC Coach of the Year (1973); 3× Big Ten Coach of the Year (1981, 1990–1991)
- College Football Hall of Fame; Inducted in 2003 (profile)

John Hayden Fry (February 28, 1929 – December 17, 2019) was an American college football player and coach. He served as the head football coach at Southern Methodist University (SMU) from 1962 to 1972, North Texas State University—now known as the University of North Texas—from 1973 to 1978, and the University of Iowa from 1979 to 1998, compiling a career coaching record of 232–178–10. Fry played in college at Baylor University. He was inducted into the College Football Hall of Fame as a coach in 2003.

== Background ==
Born in Eastland, Texas, Hayden Fry was descended from one of the Texas First Families; his great-great-grandfather fought beside General Sam Houston in the Texas War of Independence against Santa Anna in the battle of San Jacinto and in the Mexican War. Fry's family moved to Odessa, Texas, when he was in third grade. At age 14, Fry lost his father to a heart attack, and family friends observed that Fry transformed from a shy child to the head of his household. His mother worked at a movie theater, while Fry worked at oil fields during summers.

At Odessa High School, Fry earned all-state honors as quarterback and led the team to the Texas state high school championship in 1946.

Fry then played at Baylor University from 1947 to 1950. Baylor had a 26–13–2 record during Fry's four years there. Fry started a few games as an upperclassman at Baylor, but he could never win the full-time starting quarterback job. He graduated from Baylor with a degree in psychology in 1951.

Fry was an American history teacher and assistant football coach at Odessa High School for a year in 1951 before joining the U.S. Marine Corps in 1952. During his time in Odessa, Fry met and befriended a young George H. W. Bush, who would become the 41st President of the United States.

Fry served in the U.S. Marine Corps from 1952 to 1955. He played with the Quantico Marines football team in 1953, winning the Marine Corps championship and playing in the Poinsettia Bowl. Fry also coached a six-man football team while in the Marines, and the unique style of play allowed Fry to innovate and invent new creative schemes. He became friends with Al Davis, who was coaching a rival military team; Davis would later become famous as the owner of the Oakland Raiders. Fry's time coaching and serving in the Marines were an asset as he began his coaching career. Fry was discharged from the Marines in February 1955 with the rank of captain.

== High school and assistant coach ==
In 1955, Hayden returned to Odessa as a teacher and assistant football coach. The following season, Odessa head coach and former Texas A&M freshmen coach Cooper Robbins was promoted to athletic director, and Hayden Fry took his first head coaching job. At 26 years old, he was coaching the high school he had led to the state title less than 10 years earlier.

He served as Odessa's head football coach for three years. During that time, he first met and befriended the head coach at Texas A&M, Bear Bryant. Fry also continued as a history teacher at Odessa.

After the 1958 season, the new head football coach at Baylor John Bridgers hired Hayden Fry as an assistant coach. Fry spent two years at Baylor coaching the defensive backs. In 1960, Baylor had an 8–2 record in the regular season and finished the year with a one-point loss to Florida in the 1960 Gator Bowl. That season, Fry's defensive secondary helped Baylor lead the nation in pass defense.

Fry left Baylor to become an assistant coach at Arkansas under Frank Broyles. Broyles had been Fry's position coach when Fry played at Baylor. Fry was the offensive backfield coach at Arkansas in 1961. Arkansas won the Southwest Conference co-championship with an 8–2 record and narrowly lost the 1962 Sugar Bowl to Bear Bryant's Alabama squad. After one year at Arkansas, Southern Methodist University tabbed Fry as their next head football coach for the 1962 season.

== Tenure at SMU and North Texas State ==
The SMU Mustangs were members of the Southwest Conference at the time. Fry won the conference coach of the year award in his first season. In 1963, SMU opened the season with a 27–16 loss to a Michigan team coached by Bump Elliott, Fry's future boss at Iowa. SMU lost to Oregon in the 1963 Sun Bowl, 21–14. After the season, Fry was also appointed as SMU's athletic director.

Jerry LeVias had many other scholarship offers to good integrated schools, but he chose to attend SMU. LeVias became the first black player signed to a football scholarship in the Southwest Conference. In 1966, LeVias made his debut, one week after John Hill Westbrook of Baylor became the first black player to play for a conference team. Fry received abuse for recruiting a black player to SMU in the form of hate mail and threatening phone calls, but he downplayed the treatment, because the harassment of LeVias was much, much worse.

SMU had an 8–2 record in 1966 and won its first Southwest Conference title in 18 years. LeVias was named to the all-conference team and handled the racial incidents well. SMU lost in the Cotton Bowl Classic to Georgia but finished the year ranked No. 10 in the nation. SMU had a down year in 1967, but LeVias was again an all-conference selection.

In 1968, SMU went 7–3 and defeated Oklahoma in the Astro-Bluebonnet Bowl. LeVias was selected as an all-conference player as a senior for the third time. Fry's Mustangs then had just a 12–20 record over the next three years, from 1969 to 1971. That put Fry's job in jeopardy, and rumors started to swirl after Fry's Mustangs started the 1972 season at 4–4. Not even a three-game winning streak could save Fry. After a 7–4 season in 1972, Fry was fired at SMU, which robbed the Mustangs of a bowl berth.

Hayden Fry compiled a 49–66–1 record in 11 seasons at SMU, including the school's only three winning seasons since the late 1940s. In Fry's autobiography, Fry stated that he believed his firing was related to several boosters' desire to start a slush fund to pay players and recruits. SMU was the second-smallest school in the Southwest Conference, and had found it difficult to compete over the last two decades against schools double its size or more. When he refused to go along with the plan, Fry said, the boosters pressured the school's new president to fire him. As it turned out, SMU would be hit with NCAA sanctions five times after Fry's departure before having its program completely shut down for the 1987 season due to a massive litany of misconduct. Most of the violations were related to the slush fund Fry had opposed several years earlier.

Hayden Fry was hired as the coach and athletic director at North Texas State University (now the University of North Texas) before the 1973 season. North Texas appeared to be on the verge of dropping from Division I football or even ending the sport altogether. In 1973, North Texas won a share of the Missouri Valley Conference title. However, North Texas left the conference after the year in hopes of joining a more football-oriented conference. While Fry was there, North Texas never did. He also coached three of his sons while at North Texas.

Fry turned North Texas' program around, compiling a 40–23–3 record over six seasons from 1973 to 1978. In his final four seasons, North Texas had winning records, including a 10–1 mark in 1977 and a 9–2 record in 1978. Still, North Texas never received a bowl invitation. Fry wanted to go to a school where he would be assured of a bowl game with a solid record and where he did not need to also serve as athletic director.

== Iowa coaching career ==
Hayden Fry was hired as Iowa's 24th head football coach, and fourth in eight seasons, after the 1978 season. Fry had never been to Iowa, but he knew and liked Bump Elliott, by this time the university's athletic director. Iowa had had 17 straight non-winning seasons, but Fry was impressed at the fan support for a program that had struggled for so long.

Fry turned his attention to changing a losing attitude and starting new traditions at Iowa. Hayden would not celebrate close losses or moral victories, once even threatening to "punch any player in the mouth if he was smiling" following a 21–6 loss to highly ranked Oklahoma in his first season, a game which Iowa trailed only 7–6 well into the 4th quarter. He hired a marketing group to create the Tigerhawk, a logo to represent the University of Iowa's athletic programs. Since both shared the colors of black and gold, Fry gained permission from the Pittsburgh Steelers, the dominant NFL franchise of the time, to overhaul Iowa's uniforms in the Steelers' image. Fry had the team "swarm" onto the field together as they left the locker room, holding hands in a show of solidarity. He also had the visitors' locker room painted pink. Fry, a psychology major at Baylor, knew that pink is occasionally used in jails and mental institutions to relax and pacify the residents, and Fry claimed that it might have the same effect on the visiting team. Principally, though, Fry hoped that the unusual color would distract and fluster the opposing players and coaches. Visiting head coaches, particularly Bo Schembechler of Michigan, would occasionally try to cover the pink walls with paper to shield their players from the color.

On the field, Fry brought most of his assistant coaches with him from North Texas, including Bill Brashier, his defensive coordinator and a childhood friend from Eastland, Texas, and Bill Snyder, his offensive coordinator. Fry retained some of the Iowa coaches from the previous staff, including Dan McCarney and Bernie Wyatt. Finally, Fry hired the head coach at Mason City High School, Barry Alvarez. Fry would later add Kirk Ferentz as his offensive line coach and hire his former players Bob Stoops, Mike Stoops, Chuck Long, and Bret Bielema as assistant coaches. Fry also gave future South Florida head coach Jim Leavitt one of his first breaks in college football, making him a graduate assistant coach at Iowa in 1989.

=== Big Ten title (1979–1981) ===
Fry brought a wide-open passing game to the Big Ten for the first time. He had his tight ends stand at the line of scrimmage at the snap, creating a unique looking offensive formation. He tried a number of trick plays, or "exotics", to keep the opposition on its toes. All this did not immediately translate into wins. After losing seasons in 1979 and 1980, some began to wonder if Fry would suffer the same fate as the four coaches before him, who had left Iowa after failing to produce a winning season.

However, the Hawkeyes broke through in 1981, a magical season for Hawkeye fans. Iowa began the year by upsetting sixth ranked Nebraska, a team that had defeated Iowa 57–0 the previous season. Two weeks later, Iowa defeated sixth ranked UCLA to give Fry his 100th career win. Later that season, Iowa defeated Michigan in Ann Arbor for its first victory over the Wolverines in 19 years. A victory over Purdue in 1981 snapped a 20-game losing streak to the Boilermakers and clinched Iowa's first winning season in 19 years, as well as its first bowl appearance in 23 years. Fry had vowed to resign if he didn't take Iowa to a bowl game in four years; he had done so in three.

In the final game of the 1981 regular season, Iowa's win over Michigan State, coupled with an Ohio State upset of Michigan in Ann Arbor, gave Iowa a share of the 1981 Big Ten title. Since Iowa had last been to the Rose Bowl in 1959, the Hawkeyes got the conference's berth in the 1982 Rose Bowl. Either Michigan or Ohio State had gone to the Rose Bowl in each of the previous 13 seasons, prompting critics to nickname the Big Ten the "Big Two and Little Eight". While the Hawks lost to Washington, they had nonetheless altered the balance of the Big Ten.

=== Three more bowls (1982–1984) ===
Iowa started the 1982 season with an 0–2 record, but compiled a 6–2 record in the Big Ten to earn a berth in the 1982 Peach Bowl. The Hawkeyes defeated Tennessee to earn Iowa's first bowl victory since 1959.

In 1983, Fry's Hawkeyes had a 9–2 record overall and a 7–2 mark in the Big Ten as the Hawks earned an invitation to the Gator Bowl. Iowa's seven Big Ten wins set a school record, and Iowa's nine wins overall tied the school record for wins in a single season set in 1903. Iowa was ranked in the top ten in the country before losing in the Gator Bowl to Florida.

A five-game conference winning streak in 1984 helped put Fry and Iowa in contention for the league title, but injuries contributed to Iowa's 0–2–1 finish to the conference schedule. Iowa carried a 7–4–1 record into the 1984 Freedom Bowl against Texas. It was Fry's first game against a Texas school since leaving the state in 1978. The Hawkeyes set the stage for the 1985 season by routing Texas, 55–17. It was the most points scored against Texas in eighty years and the second most points ever allowed by the Longhorns.

=== Another title and more bowls (1985–1987) ===
1985 was arguably Fry's best season at Iowa. Iowa was ranked No. 1 in AP poll for the first time in 24 years and remained there for five weeks. During that time, the Hawkeyes scored two thrilling, last-minute victories as America's top team. Iowa quarterback Chuck Long scored a last minute touchdown on a bootleg run to clinch a 35–31 victory over Michigan State. Two weeks later, one of the most celebrated games in Iowa history was set to be played.

The Michigan Wolverines came into Iowa City with a perfect 5–0 record and the No. 2 ranking in the AP Poll. It was just the 12th time in college football history that the top two teams in the AP Poll met for a regular season game. It was the first such meeting where the victor scored the winning points on the game's final play. With two seconds remaining in the game and Iowa trailing 10–9, kicker Rob Houghtlin booted his fourth field goal of the day, this one from 29 yards out, as time expired to give Iowa a dramatic 12–10 victory over Michigan at Kinnick Stadium.

Iowa would finish the season with a 10–1 record, losing only in Columbus to Ohio State. Still, Iowa would win its first outright Big Ten title in 27 years and secure Fry's second Rose Bowl berth and a top ten final ranking. The Hawkeyes set a new school record for wins in 1985, and Long finished second to Bo Jackson for the Heisman Trophy by the narrowest margin in the history of the award. Iowa lost that year's Rose Bowl to UCLA, 45–28.

A win in 1986 over Iowa State was Fry's 53rd at Iowa, vaulting him past Forest Evashevski to become the winningest coach in Hawkeye history. Iowa had an 8–3 record in 1986 and accepted an invitation to the Holiday Bowl. The Hawkeyes won the 1986 Holiday Bowl, 39–38, again on a kick by Houghtlin as time expired.

In 1987, the Hawkeyes had a 9–3 record and returned to San Diego for the Holiday Bowl. A second straight Holiday Bowl victory gave Iowa another ten win season. Iowa's 62 victories from 1981 to 1987 were the most of any Big Ten team in that span, more than Michigan or Ohio State. Fry had taken a team with 19 consecutive non-winning seasons and turned them into one of the best teams in the Big Ten conference.

=== Third Big Ten title (1988–1991) ===
The 1988 season marked the 100th season of Iowa football. It was also Fry's tenth at the school, making him the first Iowa football coach to lead the Hawkeyes for a full decade. Iowa compiled a 6–3–3 record and accepted its eighth consecutive invitation to a bowl game by playing in the 1988 Peach Bowl.

In 1989, the television show Coach debuted, starring Craig T. Nelson as "Hayden Fox". The title character, created by Iowa alumnus Barry Kemp, was loosely based on Hayden Fry (Fry later appeared in commercials for the NCAA with the female lead of the TV series, Shelley Fabares), and exterior scenes for the show were shot on campus, mainly around Hillcrest Dormitory. Iowa had a disappointing season, however, as a season ending loss to Minnesota cost Iowa a ninth straight bowl game and a Copper Bowl berth, as the Hawkeyes finished the year 5–6.

The Hawks bounced right back in 1990, as Iowa started the season with a 7–1 record. Iowa's final regular season game in 1990 was against Minnesota, and Iowa entered the game with records of 8–2 overall and 6–1 in the Big Ten. Early in the game, results of other Big Ten games gave Fry his third conference title and third Rose Bowl berth in ten years more than any other Big Ten Conference team. However, Iowa's loss to Minnesota cost the Hawkeyes the outright conference crown; the Hawks finished tied atop the Big Ten Conference standings with Illinois, Michigan, and Michigan State, all of which compiled 6–2 league records. Iowa earned the trip to Pasadena, since the Hawks had beaten all three teams during the regular season, and all of them on the road. Although the Hawkeyes lost in Pasadena for the third time under Fry, many fans expected 1991 to be an even better year.

The Hawks had a better record in 1991, posting a 10–1 record, but the lone loss to Michigan cost Fry a fourth Big Ten title and Rose Bowl berth. Iowa's season ending win against Minnesota in 1991 was win number ten on the season, tying the school record for wins in a season. The win over Minnesota was also Fry's 100th victory at Iowa. The Hawkeyes accepted a third invitation to the Holiday Bowl, and the 13–13 tie with BYU gave Iowa a 10–1–1 final record and a top ten finish in the final AP rankings.

Iowa's winning percentage from 1981 to 1991 ranked second in the Big Ten behind Michigan and ahead of Ohio State. The Hawkeyes played in 10 bowl games in 11 years and won three Big Ten titles during that span.

=== Winning two more bowl games (1992–1996) ===
As Fry got older and several assistant coaches departed for other coaching jobs, Iowa had a down period from 1992 to 1994. A season ending loss to Minnesota in 1992 gave Fry just his second losing season in the last 12 years, as Iowa finished with a 5–7 record. After starting the 1993 season at 2–5, the Hawkeyes rebounded with four straight wins to garner an Alamo Bowl berth. Iowa's final win of the 1993 season over Minnesota gave Fry the 200th victory of his coaching career. However, Iowa lost the inaugural Alamo Bowl to California, 37–3 to finish 6–6.

The Hawkeyes struggled to a 5–5–1 record the following year in 1994, and some critics wondered if Fry's coaching career was at an end.

Fry had one last run of winning seasons. In 1995, the Hawkeyes had a 7–4 record and played Pacific-10 Conference co-champion Washington in the Sun Bowl. Fry got a measure of revenge against Washington, who had defeated Iowa in two of their three trips to the Rose Bowl under Fry, by defeating the heavily favored Huskies, 38–18. The Hawks then had an 8–3 record in 1996 and ended the year by recording the first bowl shutout in school history with a 27–0 victory over Texas Tech in the Alamo Bowl.

=== Retirement (1997–1998) ===
In 1997, the Hawkeyes were expected to again challenge for the Big Ten title. Instead, Wisconsin defeated Iowa for the first time in 20 years. Iowa also led eventual co-national champion Michigan at halftime, 21–7, before falling in Ann Arbor, 28–24. The Hawkeyes ended the disappointing year by losing in the Sun Bowl to Arizona State.

The 1998 season marked Fry's 20th and final season at the University of Iowa. It was his worst season at Iowa, as the Hawks finished with a 3–8 record. That season included a 27–9 home loss to intrastate rival Iowa State (Fry's first loss to Iowa State in 15 years). Fry, who was secretly undergoing radiation treatments for prostate cancer all year, announced his retirement on November 22, 1998.

In 2002, Fry reportedly expressed an interest in the open head coaching position at his alma mater, Baylor University, that ultimately went to Guy Morriss.

== Legacy and honors ==
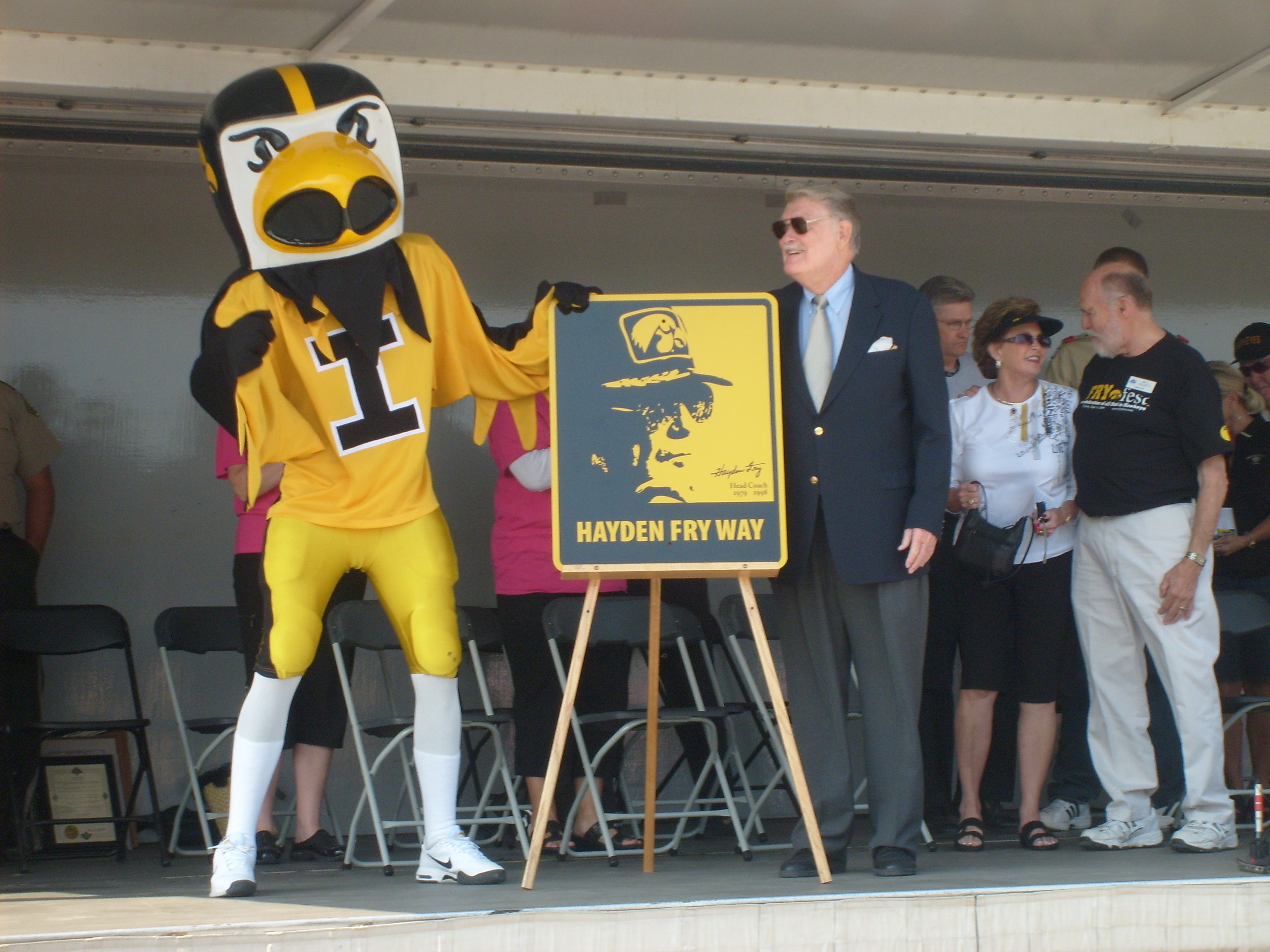
Hayden Fry during the official dedication of the "Hayden Fry Way" in Coralville, Iowa, at the 2009 "Fry Fest"

Fry coached two decades at Iowa, more than twice as long as any coach before him. Fry had a 143–89–6 record at Iowa, giving him the most wins in school history until he was passed by Kirk Ferentz on September 1, 2018. The win came in Ferentz's 20th season, as he also tied Fry's tenure. He led the Hawkeyes to 14 bowl games; before his arrival they had been to two bowl games in 90 years. He also led the Hawkeyes to three Big Ten titles (one outright, two shared) and three Rose Bowl appearances. Several of Fry's former assistants, such as Barry Alvarez at Wisconsin and Bill Snyder at Kansas State, followed Fry's example in resurrecting other struggling football programs.

Former Fry assistants or players who have taken over as head coaches at a Division I-A college football programs include:

- Barry Alvarez, Wisconsin, 1990–2005
- Bret Bielema, Wisconsin, 2006–2012; Arkansas, 2013–2017; Illinois 2021–present
- Bob Diaco, Connecticut, 2014–2016
- Kirk Ferentz, Iowa, 1999–present
- Jim Leavitt, South Florida, 1996–2009
- Chuck Long, San Diego State, 2006–2008
- Dan McCarney, Iowa State, 1995–2006; North Texas, 2011–2015
- Jerry Moore, North Texas State, 1979–1980; Texas Tech, 1981–1985; Appalachian State, 1989–2012
- Jay Norvell: Nevada, 2017–2021, Colorado State, 2022–2025
- Bo Pelini, Nebraska, 2008–2014; Youngstown State 2015–2019
- Bob Stoops, Oklahoma, 1999–2016
- Mark Stoops, Kentucky, 2013–present
- Mike Stoops, Arizona, 2004–2011
- Bill Snyder, Kansas State, 1989–2005, 2009–2018

After undergoing successful treatment for prostate cancer, Fry moved to Nevada to live in retirement. He was inducted into the College Football Hall of Fame in 2003, alongside former SMU star Jerry LeVias. He received the Amos Alonzo Stagg Award, presented by the American Football Coaches Association, in 2005.

In 2009, prior to the first football game of the Hawkeyes' season, First Avenue in adjoining Coralville was co-named Hayden Fry Way in his honor. This road is one of the main routes that can be taken to Kinnick Stadium from Interstate 80.

On December 30, 2010, Fry was inducted into the Rose Bowl Hall of Fame in a ceremony at the Pasadena Convention Center. As part of being honored, Fry participated in the 122nd Annual Tournament of Roses Parade and was recognized for his induction at the 2011 Rose Bowl following the third quarter. In the Rose Bowl game during which Fry was honored, his former player Bret Bielema's Wisconsin Badgers lost to the TCU Horned Frogs.

In January 2016, it was announced that Coralville's City Council was set to vote on an agreement with a company to design and create a life-sized bronze statue to honor Fry. The city hired Max-Cast, a fine arts foundry, to create the $36,000 statue that would be placed along Hayden Fry Way. In May 2016, it was announced that the statue would be unveiled at Fry Fest 2016 on September 2. The following week, the statue was permanently installed at the northwest corner of the First Avenue and Ninth Street intersection in Coralville, and serves as both an entrance to the Iowa River Landing and a foreboding presence to opposing teams visiting Kinnick Stadium.

== Death ==
On December 17, 2019, Fry died of cancer at age 90.

== In popular culture ==
A television sitcom, Coach, aired for nine seasons on ABC from 1989 to 1997. The series starred Craig T. Nelson as Hayden Fox, head football coach of the fictional Minnesota State University Screaming Eagles. The show's creator and producer, Barry Kemp, a University of Iowa alumnus, named the main character Hayden Fox as a tribute to Fry.

== Head coaching record ==
=== College ===
Year	Team	Overall	Conference	Standing	Bowl/playoffs	Coaches^{#}	AP^{°}
SMU Mustangs (Southwest Conference) (1962–1972)
1962	SMU	2–8	2–5	7th			
1963	SMU	4–7	2–5	T–6th	L Sun		
1964	SMU	1–9	0–7	8th			
1965	SMU	4–5–1	3–4	T–4th			
1966	SMU	8–3	6–1	1st	L Cotton	9	10
1967	SMU	3–7	3–4	6th			
1968	SMU	8–3	5–2	3rd	W Astro-Bluebonnet	16	14
1969	SMU	3–7	3–4	5th			
1970	SMU	5–6	3–4	T–4th			
1971	SMU	4–7	3–4	5th			
1972	SMU	7–4	4–3	T–2nd			
SMU:		49–66–1	34–43				
North Texas State Mean Green (Missouri Valley Conference) (1973–1974)
1973	North Texas State	5–5–1	5–1	T–1st			
1974	North Texas State	2–7–2	1–3–2	6th			
North Texas State Mean Green (NCAA Division I/I-A independent) (1975–1978)
1975	North Texas State	7–4					
1976	North Texas State	7–4					
1977	North Texas State	10–1				16	
1978	North Texas State	9–2					
North Texas State:		40–23–3	6–4–2				
Iowa Hawkeyes (Big Ten Conference) (1979–1998)
1979	Iowa	5–6	4–4	5th			
1980	Iowa	4–7	4–4	4th			
1981	Iowa	8–4	6–2	T–1st	L Rose	15	18
1982	Iowa	8–4	6–2	3rd	W Peach		
1983	Iowa	9–3	7–2	3rd	L Gator	14	14
1984	Iowa	8–4–1	5–3–1	T–4th	W Freedom	15	16
1985	Iowa	10–2	7–1	1st	L Rose	9	10
1986	Iowa	9–3	5–3	T–3rd	W Holiday	15	16
1987	Iowa	10–3	6–2	T–2nd	W Holiday	16	16
1988	Iowa	6–4–3	4–1–3	T–3rd	L Peach		
1989	Iowa	5–6	3–5	T–6th			
1990	Iowa	8–4	6–2	T–1st	L Rose	16	18
1991	Iowa	10–1–1	7–1	2nd	T Holiday	10	10
1992	Iowa	5–7	4–4	5th			
1993	Iowa	6–6	3–5	8th	L Alamo		
1994	Iowa	5–5–1	3–4–1	7th			
1995	Iowa	8–4	4–4	6th	W Sun	22	25
1996	Iowa	9–3	6–2	T–3rd	W Alamo	18	18
1997	Iowa	7–5	4–4	T–6th	L Sun		
1998	Iowa	3–8	2–6	T–7th			
Iowa:		143–89–6	96–61–5				
Total:		232–178–10					
National championship Conference title Conference division title or championship game berth
^{#}Rankings from final Coaches Poll.; ^{°}Rankings from final AP Poll.

== See also ==
- List of college football career coaching wins leaders
- List of presidents of the American Football Coaches Association
- Legends Poll
