= Tavian Banks =

American football player and coach (born 1974)

No. 22
- Position: Running back

Personal information
- Born: February 17, 1974 (age 52); Moline, Illinois, U.S.
- Listed height: 5 ft 9 in (1.75 m)
- Listed weight: 203 lb (92 kg)

Career information
- High school: Bettendorf (Bettendorf, Iowa)
- College: Iowa (1994–1997)
- NFL draft: 1998: 4th round, 101st overall pick

Career history

Playing
- Jacksonville Jaguars (1998–1999); New Orleans Saints (2003–2004)*
- * Offseason or practice squad member only

Coaching
- Louisville Cardinals (2006) Running backs coach

Awards and highlights
- Third-team All-American (1997); Big Ten Co-Offensive Player of the Year (1997); First-team All-Big Ten (1997)

Career NFL statistics
- Rushing yards: 222
- Rushing average: 4.5
- Rushing touchdowns: 1
- Receptions: 18
- Receiving yards: 157
- Stats at Pro Football Reference

Tavian Remond Banks (born February 17, 1974) is an American former professional football player who played as a running back for the Jacksonville Jaguars of the National Football League (NFL). He played college football for the Iowa Hawkeyes, earning third-team All-American honors in 1997. He was selected by the Jaguars in the fourth round of the 1998 NFL draft, where played from 1998 to 2000. He also was a member of the New Orleans Saints.

== Early life ==
Tavian Banks was a high school standout in both football and soccer at Bettendorf High School Bulldogs in Bettendorf, Iowa, breaking many school records.

== College career ==
Banks chose to play for the in-state Iowa Hawkeyes over offers from national powers Miami Hurricanes and Washington Huskies. After being a backup to standout Sedrick Shaw for most of his first three years, Banks became the full-time starter his senior season. Tavian coined the nickname "Big Money" while at Iowa as a play on his last name. During his senior campaign in the 1997 season, Banks rushed for a school record 1,691 yards and 17 touchdowns, an Iowa single-season record that stood until Shonn Greene broke it in 2008. In the second game of the 1997 season, Banks rushed for 314 yards and scored four times in Iowa's victory over Tulsa. Banks holds the school record for touchdowns scored in a career with 33. Iowa finished 1997 with a record of 7–5 after losing to Arizona State in the 1997 Sun Bowl.

== Professional career ==
Pre-draft measurables
Height	Weight	Arm length	Hand span	40-yard dash	10-yard split	20-yard split	20-yard shuttle	Three-cone drill	Vertical jump	Broad jump	Bench press
5 ft 9 5/8 in (1.77 m)	198 lb (90 kg)	31 7/8 in (0.81 m)	9 5/8 in (0.24 m)	4.48 s	1.52 s	2.59 s	3.95 s	7.34 s	39.0 in (0.99 m)	10 ft 5 in (3.18 m)	15 reps

Banks was selected by the Jacksonville Jaguars in the fourth round of the 1998 NFL draft, the same draft in which Jaguars great Fred Taylor was drafted in the first round. After a promising start to the 1999 season, Banks suffered a major knee injury during a game against the Atlanta Falcons. Banks tore the anterior cruciate ligament (ACL), posterior cruciate ligament (PCL), and fibular collateral ligament (LCL) in his left knee and missed over two years due to surgery and rehab. Banks attempted a comeback with the New Orleans Saints in 2002. He was named to the practice squad in 2003. Banks was placed on waivers by the Saints in at the conclusion of the 2004 season.

== Coaching career ==
Banks served as the assistant running backs coach for the Louisville Cardinals in 2006, but decided to leave the team when head coach Bobby Petrino left for the Atlanta Falcons. Currently, Banks is the C.E.O. of Carpe Diem Sports Enhancement in Yorkville, Illinois. He is currently a running backs coach at Naperville Central High School.

In 2008, Banks was inducted into the Iowa High School Sports Hall of Fame, and in 2009 he was elected to the Quad City Sports Hall of Fame.
