= 1995 Penn State Nittany Lions football team =

American college football season

1995 Penn State Nittany Lions football

Outback Bowl champion

Outback Bowl, W 43–14 vs. Auburn
- Conference: Big Ten Conference

Ranking
- Coaches: No. 12
- AP: No. 13
- Record: 9–3 (5–3 Big Ten)
- Head coach: Joe Paterno (30th season)
- Offensive coordinator: Fran Ganter (12th season)
- Offensive scheme: Pro-style
- Defensive coordinator: Jerry Sandusky (19th season)
- Base defense: 4–3
- Captains: Todd Atkins; Bobby Engram; Jeff Hartings; Terry Killens
- Home stadium: Beaver Stadium

1995 Big Ten Conference football standings
	Conf.					Overall
Team	W		L		T	W		L		T
No. 8 Northwestern $	8	–	0	–	0	10	–	2	–	0
No. 6 Ohio State	7	–	1	–	0	11	–	2	–	0
No. 13 Penn State	5	–	3	–	0	9	–	3	–	0
No. 17 Michigan	5	–	3	–	0	9	–	4	–	0
Michigan State	4	–	3	–	1	6	–	5	–	1
No. 25 Iowa	4	–	4	–	0	8	–	4	–	0
Illinois	3	–	4	–	1	5	–	5	–	1
Wisconsin	3	–	4	–	1	4	–	5	–	2
Purdue	2	–	5	–	1	4	–	6	–	1
Minnesota	1	–	7	–	0	3	–	8	–	0
Indiana	0	–	8	–	0	2	–	9	–	0
$ – Conference champion; Rankings from AP Poll

The 1995 Penn State Nittany Lions football team represented the Pennsylvania State University as a member of the Big Ten Conference during the 1995 NCAA Division I-A football season. Led by 30th-year head coach Joe Paterno, the Nittany Lions compiled an overall record of 9–3 with a mark of 5–3 in conference play, tying for third place in the Big Ten. Penn State was invited to the Outback Bowl, where the Nittany Lions defeated Auburn. The team played home games at Beaver Stadium in University Park, Pennsylvania.

== Schedule ==
Date	Time	Opponent	Rank	Site	TV	Result	Attendance	Source
September 9	12:00 p.m.	Texas Tech*	No. 4	Beaver Stadium; University Park, PA	ABC	W 24–23	96,034	
September 16	12:00 p.m.	Temple*	No. 7	Beaver Stadium; University Park, PA	Creative	W 66–14	95,926	
September 23	7:30 p.m.	at Rutgers*	No. 6	Giants Stadium; East Rutherford, NJ	ESPN	W 59–34	58,870	
September 30	5:45 p.m.	Wisconsin	No. 6	Beaver Stadium; University Park, PA	ESPN	L 9–17	96,540	
October 7	12:00 p.m.	No. 5 Ohio State	No. 12	Beaver Stadium; University Park, PA (rivalry)	ABC	L 25–28	96,655	
October 14	12:30 p.m.	at Purdue	No. 20	Ross–Ade Stadium; West Lafayette, IN	ESPN	W 26–23	60,455	
October 21	3:30 p.m.	at No. 18 Iowa	No. 19	Kinnick Stadium; Iowa City, IA	ABC	W 41–27	70,397	
October 28	12:00 p.m.	Indiana^{†}	No. 16	Beaver Stadium; University Park, PA	ESPN2	W 45–21	96,391	
November 4	3:30 p.m.	at No. 6 Northwestern	No. 12	Dyche Stadium; Evanston, IL	ABC	L 10–21	49,256	
November 18	12:00 p.m.	No. 12 Michigan	No. 19	Beaver Stadium; University Park, PA (rivalry)	ABC	W 27–17	96,677	
November 25	3:30 p.m.	at Michigan State	No. 14	Spartan Stadium; East Lansing, MI (rivalry)	ESPN	W 24–20	66,189	
January 1, 1996	11:00 a.m.	vs. No. 16 Auburn*	No. 15	Tampa Stadium; Tampa, FL (Outback Bowl)	ESPN	W 43–14	65,313	
*Non-conference game; ^{†}Homecoming; Rankings from AP Poll released prior to the game; All times are in Eastern time

== Game summaries ==
=== Texas Tech ===
Texas Tech Red Raiders at Penn State Nittany Lions

Quarter	1	2	3	4	Total
Texas Tech	7	13	0	3	23
Penn State	7	0	7	10	24

at Beaver Stadium, State College, Pennsylvania

- Date: September 9, 1995
- Game time: 12:00 p.m. EST
- Game attendance: 96,034
- TV announcers (ABC): Brent Musburger, Dick Vermeil
- Box Score

Game information
First quarter
- TTU - Banks recovered fumble in end zone (Greaser kick)
- PSU - Witman 2 run (Conway kick)

Second quarter

- TTU - Scovell 20 pass from Lethridge (Greaser kick)
- TTU - B Hanspard 7 pass from Lethridge (kick failed)

Third quarter

- PSU - Witman 3 run (Conway kick)

Fourth quarter

- PSU - Olsommer 3 pass from Richardson (Conway kick)
- TTU - FG Rogers 42
- PSU - FG Conway 39

=== Temple ===
Temple Owls at Penn State Nittany Lions

Quarter	1	2	3	4	Total
Temple	0	7	7	0	14
Penn State	17	14	21	14	66

at Beaver Stadium, State College, Pennsylvania

- Date: September 16, 1995
- Game time: 12:00 p.m. EST
- Game attendance: 95,926
- TV announcers (Creative Sports syndication): Wayne Larrivee, Randy Wright
- Box Score

Game information
First quarter
- PSU - Archie 22 run (Conway kick)
- PSU - FG Conway 32
- PSU - Witman 11 pass from Richardson (Conway kick)

Second quarter

- PSU - Engram 26 pass from Richardson (Conway kick)
- PSU - Milne 1 run (Conway kick)
- TEM - Baxter 5 pass from Burris (Michalski kick)

Third quarter

- PSU - Stephenson 4 pass from Richardson (Conway kick)
- PSU - Enis 24 run (Conway kick)
- PSU - Milne 1 run (Barninger kick)
- TEM - Burris 18 run (Michalski kick)

Fourth quarter

- PSU - Enis 1 run (Barninger kick)
- PSU - Enis 6 run (Barninger kick)

=== Rutgers ===
Penn State Nittany Lions at Rutgers Scarlet Knights

Quarter	1	2	3	4	Total
Penn State	17	7	14	21	59
Rutgers	7	10	10	7	34

at Giants Stadium, East Rutherford, New Jersey

- Date: September 23, 1995
- Game time: 7:30 p.m. EST
- Game attendance: 58,870
- Box Score

Game information
First quarter
- PSU - Engram 58 fumble return (Conway kick)
- PSU - FG Conway 42
- PSU - Engram 47 pass from Richardson (Conway kick)
- RUT - Presley 3 run (Mike-Mayer kick)

Second quarter

- PSU - Milne 18 run (Conway kick)
- RUT - FG Mike-Mayer 47
- RUT - Battaglia 17 pass from Higgins (Mike-Mayer kick)

Third quarter

- PSU - Engram 29 pass from Richardson (Conway kick)
- RUT - Battaglia 35 pass from Higgins (Mike-Mayer kick)
- PSU - Witman 4 run (Conway kick)
- RUT - FG Mike-Mayer 33

Fourth quarter

- PSU - Herring 21 interception return (Conway kick)
- PSU - Engram 16 pass from Richardson (Conway kick)
- RUT - Battaglia 4 pass from Higgins (Mike-Mayer kick)
- PSU - Campbell 42 pass from McQueary (Barninger kick)

=== Wisconsin ===
Wisconsin Badgers at Penn State Nittany Lions

Quarter	1	2	3	4	Total
Wisconsin	10	0	0	7	17
Penn State	0	0	3	6	9

at Beaver Stadium, State College, Pennsylvania

- Date: September 30, 1995
- Game time: 5:00 p.m. EST
- Game attendance: 96,540
- Box Score

Game information
First quarter
- WIS - FG J Hall 26
- WIS - Nyquist 21 pass from Bevell (J Hall kick)

Second quarter

Third quarter

- PSU - FG Conway 32

Fourth quarter

- WIS - T Simmons 21 pass from Bevell (J Hall kick)
- PSU - Scott 5 pass from Richardson (two-point conversion failed)

=== Ohio State ===
#5 Ohio State Buckeyes at #12 Penn State Nittany Lions

Quarter	1	2	3	4	Total
Ohio State	0	14	7	7	28
Penn State	10	0	8	7	25

at Beaver Stadium, State College, Pennsylvania

- Date: October 7, 1995
- Game time: 12:00 p.m. EST
- Game weather: Partly Cloudy, 70 °F (21 °C); Wind WNW 10-20
- Game attendance: 96,655
- Referee: Jim Kemerling
- Box Score

Game information

First quarter

- PSU - Jon Witman 3-yard run (Brett Conway kick)
- PSU - Brett Conway 40-yard field goal

Second quarter

- OSU - Terry Glenn 28-yard pass from Bobby Hoying (Josh Jackson kick)
- OSU - Rickey Dudley 25-yard pass from Bobby Hoying (Josh Jackson kick)

Third quarter

- OSU - Terry Glenn 37-yard pass from Bobby Hoying (Josh Jackson kick)
- PSU - Jon Witman 1-yard run (Joe Jurevicius pass from Wally Richardson)

Fourth quarter

- PSU - Jon Witman 1-yard run (Brett Conway kick)
- OSU - Eddie George 4-yard run (Josh Jackson kick)

Top Passers

- OSU - Bobby Hoying - 24/35, 354 yards, 3 TDs, 1 INT
- PSU - Wally Richardson - 12/27, 173 yards

Top Rushers

- PSU - Curtis Enis - 25 rushes, 146 yards
- OSU - Eddie George - 24 rushes, 105 yards, 1 TD

Top Receivers

- OSU - Terry Glenn - 9 receptions, 175 yards, 2 TDs
- OSU - Rickey Dudley - 5 receptions, 97 yards, 1 TD

=== Purdue ===
Penn State Nittany Lions at Purdue Boilermakers

Quarter	1	2	3	4	Total
Penn State	0	10	6	10	26
Purdue	6	7	0	10	23

at Ross-Ade Stadium, West Lafayette, Indiana

- Date: October 14, 1995
- Game time: 12:30 p.m.
- Game attendance: 60,455
- Box Score

Game information

First quarter

- PUR - Bobich 37-yard field goal
- PUR - Bobich 21-yard field goal

Second quarter

- PSU - Engram 48-yard pass from Richardson (Conway kick)
- PSU - Conway 35-yard field goal
- PUR - Alstott 18-yard run (Bobich kick)

Third quarter

- PSU - Conway 42-yard field goal
- PSU - Conway 33-yard field goal

Fourth quarter

- PUR - Bobich 22-yard field goal
- PUR - Rogers 4-yard run (Bobich kick)
- PSU - Conway 25-yard field goal
- PSU - Archie 16-yard pass from Richardson (Conway kick)

Top Rushers

- PSU - Curtis Enis - 18 rushes, 85 yards
- PUR - Mike Alstott - 24 rushes, 149 yards, 1 TD

=== Iowa ===
#19 Penn State at #18 Iowa

Quarter	1	2	3	4	Total
Penn State	10	7	7	17	41
Iowa	7	7	6	7	27

at Kinnick Stadium, Iowa City, Iowa

- Date: October 21, 1995
- Game time: 3:30 p.m. EST
- Game attendance: 70,397
- TV announcers (ABC): Keith Jackson, Bob Griese, and Lynn Swann
- Box Score

Game information
First quarter
- PSU - Witman 1 run (Conway kick)
- IOWA - Odems 18 pass from Sherman (Bromert kick)
- PSU - FG Conway 42

Second quarter

- PSU - Witman 1 run (Conway kick)
- IOWA - Dwight 29 pass from Sherman (Bromert kick)

Third quarter

- IOWA - FG Bromert 22
- PSU - Witman 1 run (Conway kick)
- IOWA - FG Bromert 26

Fourth quarter

- IOWA - S Shaw 19 run (Bromert kick)
- PSU - FG Conway 26
- PSU - Engram 13 pass from Richardson (Conway kick)
- PSU - Engram 43 pass from Richardson (Conway kick)

=== Indiana ===
Indiana Hoosiers at Penn State Nittany Lions

Quarter	1	2	3	4	Total
Indiana	0	0	0	21	21
Penn State	14	10	14	7	45

at Beaver Stadium, State College, Pennsylvania

- Date: October 28, 1995
- Game time: 12:00 p.m. EST
- Game attendance: 96,391
- Game Recap

Game information
First quarter

Second quarter Third quarter Fourth quarter

=== Northwestern ===
#12 Penn State at #6 Northwestern

Quarter	1	2	3	4	Total
Penn State	0	7	3	0	10
Northwestern	7	7	0	7	21

at Dyche Stadium, Evanston, Illinois

- Date: November 4, 1995
- Game time: 3:30 p.m. EST
- Game attendance: 49,256
- TV announcers (ABC): Keith Jackson, Bob Griese, and Lynn Swann
- Box Score

Game information
First quarter
- NU - Darnell Autry 2-yard run (Gowins kick) NW 7–0

Second quarter

- NU - Darnell Autry 11-yard run (Gowins kick) NW 14–0
- PSU - Olsommer 5-yard pass from Richardson (Conway kick) NW 14–7

Third quarter

- PSU - Conway 24-yard field goal NW 14–10

Fourth quarter

- NU - Darnell Autry 1-yard run (Gowins kick) 'NW 21–10

=== Michigan ===
Michigan Wolverines at Penn State Nittany Lions

Quarter	1	2	3	4	Total
Michigan	0	7	3	7	17
Penn State	0	13	0	14	27

at Beaver Stadium, State College, Pennsylvania

- Date: November 18, 1995
- Game time: 12:00 p.m. EST
- Game attendance: 96,677
- Box Score

Game information

Second quarter

- PSU - Conway 49-yard field goal
- PSU - Archie 13-yard pass from Richardson (Conway kick)
- UM - Toomer 18-yard pass from Griese (Hamilton kick)
- PSU - Conway 51-yard field goal

Third quarter

- UM - Hamilton kick 29-yard field goal

Fourth quarter

- PSU - Engram 12-yard pass from Richardson (Conway kick)
- UM - Biakabutuka 18-yard run (Hamilton kick)
- PSU - Nastasi 2-yard run on fake field goal (Conway kick)

Top Passers

- UM - Brian Griese - 24/46, 232 yards, 1 TD, 2 INTs
- PSU - Wally Richardson - 17/31, 193 yards, 2 TDs

Top Rushers

- UM - Tim Biakabutuka - 26 rushes, 139 yards, 1 TD
- PSU - Pitts - 17 rushes, 164 yards

Top Receivers

- UM - Amani Toomer - 8 receptions, 128 yards, 1 TD
- PSU - Bobby Engram - 5 receptions, 87 yards, 1 TD

=== Michigan State ===
Penn State Nittany Lions at Michigan State Spartans

Quarter	1	2	3	4	Total
Penn State	0	7	3	14	24
Michigan State	0	10	0	10	20

at Spartan Stadium, East Lansing, Michigan

- Date: November 25, 1995
- Game time: 3:30 p.m. EST
- Game attendance: 66,189
- TV: ESPN
- Box Score

Game information
First quarter
- No scoring

Second quarter

- PSU - Milne 1-yard run (Conway kick)
- MSU - Gardner 32-yard field goal
- MSU - Greene 3-yard run (Gardner kick)

Third quarter

- PSU - Conway 42-yard field goal

Fourth quarter

- MSU - Greene 16-yard run (Gardner kick)
- PSU - Engram 53-yard pass from Richardson (Conway kick)
- MSU - Gardner 28-yard field goal
- PSU - Engram 4-yard pass from Richardson (Conway kick)

=== Outback Bowl ===
#15 Penn State Nittany Lions vs. #16 Auburn Tigers

Quarter	1	2	3	4	Total
Penn State	3	13	27	0	43
Auburn	0	7	0	7	14

at Tampa Stadium, Tampa, Florida

- Date: January 1, 1996
- Game attendance: 53,161
- TV announcers (ESPN): Ron Franklin, Mike Gottfried
- Box Score

Game information
First quarter
- PSU - Conway 19-yard field goal

Second quarter

- AUB - Baker 25-yard pass from Nix (Hawkins kick)
- PSU - Conway 22-yard field goal
- PSU - Conway 38-yard field goal
- PSU - Archie 8 yard pass from Richardson (Conway kick)

Third quarter

- PSU - Engram 9-yard pass from Richardson (Conway kick)
- PSU - Pitts 4-yard pass from Richardson (pass failed)
- PSU - Enis 1-yard run (Conway kick)
- PSU - Engram 20-yard pass from Richardson (Conway kick)

Fourth quarter

- AUB - McLeod 12-yard run (Hawkins kick)

== Roster ==
1995 Penn State Nittany Lions football team roster
Players
Coaches
Offense

Pos.	#	Name	Class
RB	2	Mike Archie	Sr
WR	11	Chris Campbell	Jr
WR	10	Bobby Engram	Sr
G	50	Jeff Hartings	Sr
OT	68	Andre Johnson	Sr
WR	83	Joe Jurevicius	So
QB	9	Mike McQueary	So
RB	22	Brian Milne	Sr
G	64	Phil Ostrowski	So
QB	14	Wally Richardson	Jr
G	54	Marco Rivera	Sr
WR	31	Freddie Scott	Jr
FB	38	Jon Witman	Sr

Defense

Pos.	#	Name	Class
S	3	Kim Herring	Jr
LB	92	Terry Killens	Sr
LB	44	Jim Nelson	So
DT	93	Brandon Noble	Jr
LB	98	Matt Rhule	So
DE	5	Brad Scioli	Fr
DE	91	Chris Snyder	So

Special teams

Pos.	#	Name	Class
K	20	Brett Conway	Jr
P	28	Darrell Kania	Jr

Head coach

- Joe Paterno

Coordinators/assistant coaches

- Stan Clayton (Graduate assistant)

Legend

- (C) Team captain
- (S) Suspended
- (I) Ineligible
- Injured
- Redshirt

Roster

== NFL draft ==
Ten Nittany Lions were drafted in the 1996 NFL draft.

Round	Pick	Overall	Name	Position	Team
1st	23	23	Jeff Hartings	Offensive guard	Detroit Lions
1st	30	30	Andre Johnson	Offensive tackle	Washington Redskins
2nd	22	52	Bobby Engram	Wide receiver	Chicago Bears
3rd	13	74	Terry Killens	Linebacker	Houston Oilers
3rd	31	92	Jon Witman	Fullback	Pittsburgh Steelers
4th	20	115	Brian Milne	Fullback	Indianapolis Colts
6th	24	191	Keith Conlin	Offensive tackle	Indianapolis Colts
6th	31	198	Stephen Pitts	Running back	San Francisco 49ers
6th	41	208	Marco Rivera	Offensive guard	Green Bay Packers
7th	9	218	Mike Archie	Running back	Houston Oilers
