= Matt Sherman (American football) =

American football player (born 1974)

No. 12
- Position: Quarterback

Personal information
- Born: June 17, 1974 (age 52)
- Listed height: 6 ft 3 in (1.91 m)
- Listed weight: 210 lb (95 kg)

Career information
- High school: St. Ansgar (St. Ansgar, Iowa)
- College: Iowa
- NFL draft: 1998: undrafted

Career history
- Iowa Barnstormers (1999–2000)

Awards and highlights
- Second-team All-Big Ten (1996)

Career AFL statistics
- Comp. / Att.: 21 / 42
- Passing yards: 342
- TD–INT: 6–4
- Passer rating: 73.81
- Rushing TDs: 0
- Stats at ArenaFan.com

Matt Sherman (born June 17, 1974) is an American former football quarterback in the Arena Football League (AFL) who played for the Iowa Barnstormers. He played college football for the Iowa Hawkeyes.
