= 2000 Rhein Fire season =

NFL Europe team season

- General manager: Alexander Leibkind
- Head coach: Galen Hall
- Home stadium: Rheinstadion

Results
- Record: 7–3
- Division place: 1st
- Playoffs: World Bowl 2000 champion

The 2000 Rhein Fire season was the sixth season for the franchise in the NFL Europe League (NFLEL). The team was led by head coach Galen Hall in his sixth year, and played its home games at Rheinstadion in Düsseldorf, Germany. They finished the regular season in first place with a record of seven wins and three losses, qualifying for the league final for the third time in four years. Rhein won the second championship in team history by defeating the Scottish Claymores 13–10 in World Bowl 2000.

== Offseason ==
=== Free agent draft ===
2000 Rhein Fire NFLEL free agent draft selections
Draft order		Player name	Position	College
Round	Choice	Player name	Position	College
1	4	Rome Douglas	T	Southern California
2	10	Michael Early	C	Norfolk State
3	15	Terrance Joseph	S	Tulsa
4	22	Everett Burnett	WR	Kansas State
5	27	Pepe Pearson	RB	Ohio State
6	34	Daniel Jones	WR	Utah
7	39	Stephen Fisher	CB	North Carolina
8	46	Dan Collins	G	Boston College
9	51	Derrick Steagall	WR	Georgia Tech
10	58	Thomas Guynes	T	Michigan
11	63	Dusty Renfro	LB	Texas
12	70	Kevin Cooper	WR	Mississippi State
13	75	William Carr	DT	Michigan
14	82	Tim Martin	DE	Tulsa
15	87	Matthew Hickl	S	Texas A&M-Kingville
16	94	Mark Smith	LB	Arkansas
17	99	Scott Whittaker	T	Kansas
18	106	Nakia Reddick	S	Central Florida
19	111	Kevin Drake	WR	Alabama-Birmingham
20	118	James Clyburn	DT	North Carolina A&T

== Personnel ==
=== Staff ===
2000 Rhein Fire staff
Front office: General Manager – Alexander Leibkind; Head coaches: Head Coach/Running Backs – Galen Hall; Offensive coaches: Offensive Coordinator/Quarterbacks – Bart Andrus; Wide Receivers – Mike Jones; Offensive Line – Whitey Jordan	Defensive coaches: Defensive Coordinator/Linebackers – Pete Kuharchek; National Coach/Defensive Line – Walter Rohlfing; Defensive Backs/Special Teams – Jeff Reinebold

=== Roster ===
2000 Rhein Fire final roster
Quarterbacks: 8 Matt Lytle; 7 Danny Wuerffel; Running backs: 25 Ontiwaun Carter; 28 Carl McCullough; 20 Pepe Pearson; Wide receivers: 80 Tim Alexander; 86 Kevin Drake; 1 Alonzo Johnson; 18 Kendrick Nord; 84 Jeff Ogden; Tight ends: 85 Lawrence Hart; 87 Ryan Neufeld	Offensive linemen: 77 Ben Adams G; 67 Chris Brymer C/G; 66 Dan Collins T/G; 63 Michael Early C; 75 Craig Heimburger G; 79 Ben Nichols G/T; 73 Pete Swanson T; 78 Scott Whittaker T; Defensive linemen: 69 Ken Anderson DT; 98 Ernie Brown DT; 95 Marques Douglas DT; 99 Larry Fitzpatrick DE; 71 Derrick Ham DE; 91 Carl Powell DE	Linebackers: 53 Jamie Baisley MLB; 58 Vince Bradford OLB; 59 Kendall Ogle OLB; 57 Dusty Renfro MLB; Defensive backs: 29 Chris Akins S; 33 Nick Ferguson S; 35 Steve Fisher CB; 30 Derrick Gardner CB; 40 Matthew Hickl S; 36 Deshone Mallard CB; 44 Anthony Mitchell S; Special teams: 13 Pete Elezovic K; 12 Danny Kight K; 2 Rodney Williams P	National players: 10 (Germany) Manfred Burgsmüller K; 50 (Germany) Anthony Doghmi OLB; 23 (Germany) Sascha Gehloff S; 45 (Germany) Wolfgang Hatzky RB; 72 (Germany) Bastian Lano DE; 81 (Germany) Kai-Erik Lyck WR; 21 (Nigeria) Oyeniran Olalere Odunayo Ojo RB; 55 (Germany) Dusty Pearce OLB; Rookies in italics

== Schedule ==
Week	Date	Kickoff (Note: All times local to where the game was played.)	Opponent	Results		Game site	Attendance
Week	Date	Kickoff	Opponent	Final score	Team record	Game site	Attendance
1	Saturday, April 15	7:00 p.m.	Barcelona Dragons	W 28–17	1–0	Rheinstadion	28,924
2	Saturday, April 22	7:00 p.m.	at Amsterdam Admirals	L 20–23 ^{OT}	1–1	Amsterdam ArenA	13,285
3	Saturday, April 29	7:00 p.m.	Frankfurt Galaxy	W 34–27	2–1	Rheinstadion	43,129
4	Saturday, May 6	7:00 p.m.	at Barcelona Dragons	W 18–7	3–1	Estadi Olímpic de Montjuïc	21,200
5	Saturday, May 13	7:00 p.m.	Scottish Claymores	W 22–10	4–1	Rheinstadion	30,537
6	Sunday, May 21	3:00 p.m.	at Berlin Thunder	L 21–25 ^{OT}	4–2	Jahn-Sportpark	10,273
7	Saturday, May 27	7:00 p.m.	Berlin Thunder	W 28–27	5–2	Rheinstadion	33,437
8	Sunday, June 4	7:00 p.m.	at Frankfurt Galaxy	W 53–14	6–2	Waldstadion	41,351
9	Saturday, June 10	3:00 p.m.	at Scottish Claymores	L 24–31	6–3	Hampden Park	10,196
10	Sunday, June 18	7:00 p.m.	Amsterdam Admirals	W 31–28	7–3	Rheinstadion	37,113
World Bowl 2000
11	Sunday, June 25	7:00 p.m.	Scottish Claymores	W 13–10	8–3	Waldstadion	35,860

== Standings ==
NFL Europe League
Team	W	L	T	PCT	PF	PA	Home	Road	STK
Rhein Fire	7	3	0	.700	279	209	5–0	2–3	W1
Scottish Claymores	6	4	0	.600	273	165	4–1	2–3	L1
Barcelona Dragons	5	5	0	.500	194	212	2–3	3–2	W1
Amsterdam Admirals	4	6	0	.400	206	243	3–2	1–4	L3
Frankfurt Galaxy	4	6	0	.400	206	269	1–4	3–2	W2
Berlin Thunder	4	6	0	.400	189	249	3–2	1–4	L1

== Game summaries ==
=== World Bowl 2000 ===
World Bowl 2000: Rhein Fire vs Scottish Claymores – Game summary

Quarter	1	2	3	4	Total
Rhein	3	3	0	7	13
Scotland	7	3	0	0	10

at Waldstadion, Frankfurt, Germany

- Date: Sunday, June 25
- Game time: 7:07 p.m. CEST
- Game weather: 17 °C (63 °F), cloudy
- Game attendance: 35,860
- Referee: Bill Leavy
- TV announcers (FOX): Sam Rosen and Bill Maas

Game information

First quarter

- Rhein – 21-yard field goal by Manfred Burgsmüller, 9:48.
- Scotland – Aaron Stecker 36-yard touchdown run, Rob Hart kick good, 8:38.

Second quarter

- Scotland – 32-yard field goal by Rob Hart, 9:03.
- Rhein – 23-yard field goal by Manfred Burgsmüller, 4:59.

Third quarter

- No scoring.

Fourth quarter

- Rhein – Pepe Pearson 1-yard touchdown run, Manfred Burgsmüller kick good, 1:12.

Leading passers

- Rhein – Danny Wuerffel – 12/30, 90 yards, 2 interceptions.
- Scotland – Kevin Daft – 16/29, 177 yards, 1 interception.

Leading rushers

- Rhein – Pepe Pearson – 14 rushes, 61 yards, 1 touchdown.
- Scotland – Aaron Stecker – 13 rushes, 92 yards, 1 touchdown.

Leading receivers

- Rhein – Jeff Ogden – 3 receptions, 26 yards.
- Scotland – Donald Sellers – 4 receptions, 56 yards.
