= 2000 Scottish Claymores season =

NFL Europe team season

- General manager: Will Wilson
- Head coach: Jim Criner
- Home stadium: Murrayfield Stadium; Hampden Park

Results
- Record: 6–4
- Division place: 2nd
- Playoffs: Lost World Bowl 2000

The 2000 Scottish Claymores season was the sixth season for the team in the NFL Europe League (NFLEL). The Claymores were led by sixth-year head coach Jim Criner and played their home games at the Murrayfield Stadium in Edinburgh (three) and the Hampden Park in Glasgow (two). Scotland finished the regular season in second place with a record of 6–4, qualifying for the league final for the second time in team history. The Claymores lost 10–13 to the Rhein Fire in World Bowl 2000.

== Personnel ==
=== Staff ===
2000 Scottish Claymores staff
Front office: General Manager – Will Wilson; Head coaches: Head Coach/Offensive Line – Jim Criner; Offensive coaches: Offensive Coordinator/Quarterbacks/Receivers – Vince Alcalde; Running Backs – Kevin O'Neal; National Coach/Tight Ends – Stephen McCusker	Defensive coaches: Defensive Coordinator/Linebackers – Myrel Moore; Defensive Line – Jim Tomsula; Defensive Backs – Richard Kent

=== Roster ===
2000 Scottish Claymores final roster
Quarterbacks: 5 Marcus Crandell; 13 Kevin Daft; Running backs: 35 Kelvin Eafon; 33 Ben Snell; 28 Siran Stacy; 27 Aaron Stecker; Wide receivers: 84 Damon Gibson; 19 Deon Mitchell; 80 Sulecio Sanford; 4 Donald Sellers; Tight ends: 86 Tremayne Allen; 89 Rickey Brady; 85 Willy Tate	Offensive linemen: 66 Chad Abernathy G (IR); 62 Ben Cavil G; 65 Scott Curry T; 63 Jason Gamble G; 67 Cornell Green T; 64 Mike Newell C; 76 Steve Scifres G; 77 Jason Tenner T; Defensive linemen: 74 Antonio Dingle DT; 90 Michael Mason DE; 97 Noel Scarlett DT; 93 Rasheed Simmons DE; 92 Jabbar Threats DE; 99 Chris Ward DE	Linebackers: 50 Matt Finkes MLB; 54 Phil Glover OLB; 53 Jon Hesse OLB; 55 Brian Smith MLB; 56 Ryan Taylor OLB; Defensive backs: 46 Chris Bayne S; 36 Kory Blackwell CB; 38 Duane Hawthorne CB; 29 Central McClellion CB; 45 Blaine McElmurry S; 29 Marcus Ray S; 40 Hurley Tarver CB; 20 Cordell Taylor CB	National players: 88 (Japan) Nachi Abe TE; 15 (Australia) Jon Ballantyne P; 75 (England) Jermaine Benoit DE; 21 (England) Rowelle Blenman WR; 81 (Scotland) Scott Couper WR; 8 (England) Rob Hart K; 44 (Scotland) Peter Sochart TE; 7 (Japan) Takayuki Sunaga QB; 91 (England) Tom Tovo DT; Rookies in italics

== Schedule ==
Week	Date	Kickoff (Note: All times local to where the game was played.)	Opponent	Results		Game site	Attendance
Week	Date	Kickoff	Opponent	Final score	Team record	Game site	Attendance
1	Sunday, 16 April	3:00 p.m.	Amsterdam Admirals	W 28–9	1–0	Murrayfield Stadium	8,726
2	Saturday, 22 April	7:00 p.m.	at Frankfurt Galaxy	W 17–14	2–0	Waldstadion	32,459
3	Saturday, 29 April	7:00 p.m.	at Berlin Thunder	L 20–24	2–1	Jahn-Sportpark	7,913
4	Sunday, 7 May	3:00 p.m.	Berlin Thunder	W 42–3	3–1	Murrayfield Stadium	8,912
5	Saturday, 13 May	7:00 p.m.	at Rhein Fire	L 10–22	3–2	Rheinstadion	30,537
6	Sunday, 21 May	3:00 p.m.	Frankfurt Galaxy	L 30–31 ^{OT}	3–3	Murrayfield Stadium	9,127
7	Saturday, 27 May	3:00 p.m.	Barcelona Dragons	W 28–0	4–3	Hampden Park	8,827
8	Saturday, 3 June	7:00 p.m.	at Amsterdam Admirals	W 42–10	5–3	Olympisch Stadion	10,867
9	Saturday, 10 June	3:00 p.m.	Rhein Fire	W 31–24	6–4	Hampden Park	10,196
10	Sunday, 18 June	7:00 p.m.	at Barcelona Dragons	L 25–28	6–4	Estadi Olímpic de Montjuïc	8,200
World Bowl 2000
11	Sunday, 25 June	7:00 p.m.	Rhein Fire	L 10–13	6–5	Waldstadion	35,860

== Standings ==
NFL Europe League
Team	W	L	T	PCT	PF	PA	Home	Road	STK
Rhein Fire	7	3	0	.700	279	209	5–0	2–3	W1
Scottish Claymores	6	4	0	.600	273	165	4–1	2–3	L1
Barcelona Dragons	5	5	0	.500	194	212	2–3	3–2	W1
Amsterdam Admirals	4	6	0	.400	206	243	3–2	1–4	L3
Frankfurt Galaxy	4	6	0	.400	206	269	1–4	3–2	W2
Berlin Thunder	4	6	0	.400	189	249	3–2	1–4	L1

== Game summaries ==
=== World Bowl 2000 ===
World Bowl 2000: Rhein Fire vs Scottish Claymores – Game summary

Quarter	1	2	3	4	Total
Rhein	3	3	0	7	13
Scotland	7	3	0	0	10

at Waldstadion, Frankfurt, Germany

- Date: Sunday, 25 June
- Game time: 7:07 p.m. CEST
- Game weather: 17 °C (63 °F), cloudy
- Game attendance: 35,860
- Referee: Bill Leavy
- TV announcers (FOX): Sam Rosen and Bill Maas

Game information

First quarter

- Rhein – 21-yard field goal by Manfred Burgsmüller, 9:48.
- Scotland – Aaron Stecker 36-yard touchdown run, Rob Hart kick good, 8:38.

Second quarter

- Scotland – 32-yard field goal by Rob Hart, 9:03.
- Rhein – 23-yard field goal by Manfred Burgsmüller, 4:59.

Third quarter

- No scoring.

4th Quarter

- Rhein – Pepe Pearson 1-yard touchdown run, Manfred Burgsmüller kick good, 1:12.

Leading passers

- Rhein – Danny Wuerffel – 12/30, 90 yards, 2 interceptions.
- Scotland – Kevin Daft – 16/29, 177 yards, 1 interception.

Leading rushers

- Rhein – Pepe Pearson – 14 rushes, 61 yards, 1 touchdown.
- Scotland – Aaron Stecker – 13 rushes, 92 yards, 1 touchdown.

Leading receivers

- Rhein – Jeff Ogden – 3 receptions, 26 yards.
- Scotland – Donald Sellers – 4 receptions, 56 yards.
