= 2000 Frankfurt Galaxy season =

NFL Europe team season

- General manager: Tilman Engel
- Head coach: Dick Curl
- Home stadium: Waldstadion

Results
- Record: 4–6
- Division place: 5th
- Playoffs: Did not qualify

The 2000 Frankfurt Galaxy season was the eighth season for the franchise in the NFL Europe League (NFLEL). The team was led by head coach Dick Curl in his third year, and played its home games at Waldstadion in Frankfurt, Germany. They finished the regular season in fifth place with a record of four wins and six losses.

== Offseason ==
=== Free agent draft ===
2000 Frankfurt Galaxy NFLEL free agent draft selections
Draft order		Player name	Position	College
Round	Choice	Player name	Position	College
1	6	Quincy Coleman	CB	Jackson State
2	12	Rob Bohlinger	T	Wyoming
3	13	Kevin Brooks	CB	South Carolina
4	24	Josh Kobdish	T	Fresno State
5	25	Jayson Bray	CB	Auburn
6	36	Lamont Burns	G	East Carolina
7	37	Nate Riles	CB	Ohio Northern
8	48	Charles Wiley	RB	Georgia Tech
9	49	Nate Brooks	CB	Miami
10	60	Ben Nichols	G	Colorado State
11	61	Jimmy Sprotte	LB	Arizona
12	72	Jay Johnson	RB	Grambling State
13	73	Kevin Homer	LB	Chadron State
14	84	Antonio Fleming	G	Georgia
15	85	Brian Rogers	LB	Oregon State
16	96	Marvin Coley	DE	North Alabama
17	97	Kevin McCullar	LB	Texas Tech
18	108	Mike Webster	G	Kentucky
19	109	Philip Nash	DB	Syracuse
20	120	David Hoelscher	DT	Eastern Kentucky

== Personnel ==
=== Staff ===
2000 Frankfurt Galaxy staff
Front office: General Manager – Tilman Engel; Head coaches: Head Coach/Offensive Backs – Dick Curl; Offensive coaches: Offensive Coordinator/Wide Receivers – Joe Clark; National Coach/Tight Ends – Alessandro Cinelli; Offensive Line – Cal Murphy	Defensive coaches: Defensive Coordinator/Defensive Backs – Dan Daniel; Defensive Line – Charles Jones; Linebackers – Ed O'Neil

=== Roster ===
2000 Frankfurt Galaxy (NFL Europe) roster
Quarterbacks: 14 Pat Barnes; 7 Ted White; Running backs: 27 Michael Blair; 28 Norman Miller; Wide receivers: 5 Mario Bailey; 81 Todd Floyd; 13 Gregory Spann; 80 Corey Thomas; Tight ends: 83 Brian Saxton; 88 Justin Swift	Offensive linemen: 79 Rob Bohlinger T; 61 Justin Burroughs C; 63 Antonio Fleming G; 77 Jay Hagood T; 60 Robert Hunt C/G; 76 Sale Isaia T/G; 72 Josh Kobdish T; 67 Rob Murphy G; Defensive linemen: 95 Denauld Brown DT; 92 Martin Chase DT; 94 Pernell Davis DT; 91 David Hoelscher DE; 97 Charles Preston DE; 96 Henry Taylor DT	Linebackers: 50 Shawn Banks MLB; 46 Chike Egbuniwe OLB; 52 Stan Gibbs OLB; 53 Kevin Homer OLB; 55 Bobbie Howard OLB; 59 Kevin McCullar OLB; 57 Brian Rogers MLB; Defensive backs: 38 Antonio Banks FS/SS; 44 Jayson Bray CB; 20 Kevin Brooks CB; 36 Jim Cantelupe SS; 23 Anthony Cobbs CB; 29 Quincy Coleman CB; 24 Corey Ivy CB; 25 Loren Johnson CB; 21 Tony Maranto FS; Special teams: 2 Nick Gallery P	National players: 71 (Germany) Jens Allers DT/DE; 22 (Germany) Marc Corell RB; 86 (Germany) Werner Hippler TE; 9 (Germany) Ralf Kleinmann K; 26 (Germany) Dominique Kuhn RB; 75 (Germany) Marcus Richter DE/DT; 19 (Germany) Slawomir Rybarczyk WR; 8 (Germany) Patrick Wolf WR; Rookies in italics

== Schedule ==
Week	Date	Kickoff (Note: All times local to where the game was played.)	Opponent	Results		Game site	Attendance
Week	Date	Kickoff	Opponent	Final score	Team record	Game site	Attendance
1	Saturday, April 15	7:00 p.m.	at Berlin Thunder	W 32–7	1–0	Jahn-Sportpark	10,785
2	Saturday, April 22	7:00 p.m.	Scottish Claymores	L 14–17	1–1	Waldstadion	32,459
3	Saturday, April 29	7:00 p.m.	at Rhein Fire	L 27–34	1–2	Rheinstadion	43,129
4	Saturday, May 6	7:00 p.m.	Amsterdam Admirals	L 17–20	1–3	Waldstadion	31,112
5	Saturday, May 13	7:00 p.m.	Barcelona Dragons	L 26–42	1–4	Waldstadion	32,888
6	Sunday, May 21	3:00 p.m.	at Scottish Claymores	W 31–30 ^{OT}	2–4	Murrayfield Stadium	9,127
7	Sunday, May 28	7:00 p.m.	at Amsterdam Admirals	L 7–41	2–5	Amsterdam ArenA	12,048
8	Sunday, June 4	7:00 p.m.	Rhein Fire	L 14–53	2–6	Waldstadion	41,351
9	Sunday, June 11	7:00 p.m.	at Barcelona Dragons	W 14–8	3–6	Estadi Olímpic de Montjuïc	9,300
10	Saturday, June 17	6:00 p.m.	Berlin Thunder	W 24–17	4–6	Waldstadion	31,648

== Standings ==
NFL Europe League
Team	W	L	T	PCT	PF	PA	Home	Road	STK
Rhein Fire	7	3	0	.700	279	209	5–0	2–3	W1
Scottish Claymores	6	4	0	.600	273	165	4–1	2–3	L1
Barcelona Dragons	5	5	0	.500	194	212	2–3	3–2	W1
Amsterdam Admirals	4	6	0	.400	206	243	3–2	1–4	L3
Frankfurt Galaxy	4	6	0	.400	206	269	1–4	3–2	W2
Berlin Thunder	4	6	0	.400	189	249	3–2	1–4	L1
