= 1998 Chicago Bears season =

NFL team season

- Owner: Virginia Halas McCaskey
- Head coach: Dave Wannstedt
- Home stadium: Soldier Field

Results
- Record: 4–12
- Division place: 5th NFC Central
- Playoffs: Did not qualify

The 1998 Chicago Bears season was their 79th regular season completed in the National Football League (NFL). The team finished with a 4–12 record under head coach Dave Wannstedt. At the end of the season, Dave Wannstedt was fired and was replaced by Dick Jauron the following season.

== Offseason ==
Additions	Subtractions
RB Edgar Bennett (Packers)	FB Mike Dulaney (Panthers)
LB Andre Collins (Bengals)	G Chris Gray (Seahawks)
LB Ricardo McDonald (Bengals)	LB Tony Peterson (49ers)
	RB Raymont Harris (Packers)
	DE Alonzo Spellman (Cowboys)

=== NFL draft ===
1998 Chicago Bears draft
Round	Pick	Player	Position	College	Notes
1	5	Curtis Enis	Running back	Penn State	
2	35	Tony Parrish	Safety	Washington	
3	64	Olin Kreutz *	Center	Washington	
4	94	Alonzo Mayes	Tight end	Oklahoma State	
6	157	Chris Draft	Linebacker	Stanford	
6	189	Patrick Mannelly	Offensive tackle	Duke	
7	217	Chad Overhauser	Offensive tackle	UCLA	
7	232	Moses Moreno	Quarterback	Colorado State	
Made roster * Made at least one Pro Bowl during career

=== Undrafted free agents ===
1998 undrafted free agents of note
Player	Position	College
Ken Anderson	Defensive Tackle	Arkansas
Anthony Bookman	Running back	Stanford
Quincy Coleman	Cornerback	Jackson State
Brad Crowley	Defensive end	Texas A&M
KeJaun DuBose	Defensive Tackle	Northwestern
Jim Farrell	Wide receiver	Western Illinois
Jim McElroy	Wide receiver	UCLA
Wasswa Serwanga	Cornerback	UCLA

== Staff ==
1998 Chicago Bears staff
Front office: Chairman of the Board – Ed McCaskey; President and Chief Executive Officer – Michael McCaskey; Vice President of Operations – Ted Phillips; Vice President of Player Personnel – Mark Hatley; Director of College Scouting – Bill Rees; Director of Pro Personnel – Rick Spielman; Head coaches: Head Coach – Dave Wannstedt; Assistant Head Coach/Offensive Line – Tony Wise; Offensive coaches: Offensive Coordinator/Quarterbacks – Matt Cavanaugh; Running Backs – Joe Brodsky; Wide Receivers – Ivan Fears; Tight Ends – Tom Rossley	Defensive coaches: Defensive Coordinator – Bob Slowik; Defensive Line – Clarence Brooks; Linebackers – Carlos Mainord; Defensive Backs – Greg Schiano; Special teams coaches: Special Teams – Keith Armstrong; Strength and conditioning: Physical Development Coordinator – Russ Riederer; Assistant Physical Development Coordinator – Steve Little

== Roster ==
1998 Chicago Bears roster
Quarterbacks (QB): 15 Jim Miller; 18 Steve Stenstrom; Running backs (RB): 20 James Allen; 31 Tremayne Allen FB; 32 Edgar Bennett; 38 Robert Chancey FB; 49 Ty Hallock FB; 24 Glyn Milburn; Wide receivers (WR): 82 Fabien Bownes; 83 Macey Brooks; 80 Curtis Conway; 81 Bobby Engram; 86 Chris Penn; 88 Marcus Robinson; Tight ends (TE): 84 John Allred; 85 Alonzo Mayes; 89 Ryan Wetnight	Offensive linemen (OL): 64 Andy Heck T; 78 Adam Hernandez T; 74 Jimmy Herndon T; 67 Greg Huntington C/G; 57 Olin Kreutz C/G; 69 Chad Overhauser G/T; 75 Todd Perry G; 62 Aaron Taylor G; 58 Chris Villarrial G; 60 Casey Wiegmann C; 71 James Williams T; Defensive linemen (DL): 99 Jim Flanigan DT; 93 Paul Grasmanis DT; 76 Shawn Lee DE; 68 Carl Reeves DE; 98 Bryan Robinson DE; 91 John Thierry DE; 97 Mike Wells DT	Linebackers (LB): 52 Andre Collins OLB; 96 Chris Draft MLB; 53 Lemanski Hall OLB; 55 Sean Harris OLB; 92 Barry Minter MLB; 59 Jim Schwantz MLB; Defensive backs (DB): 36 Ray Austin FS; 30 Ricky Bell CB; 23 Marty Carter SS; 43 Quincy Coleman CB; 21 Terry Cousin CB; 46 Marlon Forbes SS; 47 Randy Hilliard CB; 37 Tony Parrish FS; 29 Frankie Smith CB; Special teams (ST): 2 Mike Horan P; 1 Jeff Jaeger K; 65 Patrick Mannelly LS	Practice squad: 95 James Baron DE; 10 Tom Beck QB; 35 Pepe Pearson RB; Reserve: 70 Ken Anderson DT (IR); 25 Tom Carter CB (IR); 39 Curtis Enis RB (IR); 27 Walt Harris CB (IR); 12 Erik Kramer QB (IR); 26 John Mangum S (IR); 54 Ricardo McDonald LB (IR); 4 Moses Moreno QB (IR); 16 Todd Sauerbrun P (IR); 22 Tim Tindale RB (IR); 53 active, 10 inactive, 3 practice squad Rookies in italics

== Regular season ==
=== Schedule ===
Week	Date	Opponent	Result	Record	Venue	Attendance
1	September 6	Jacksonville Jaguars	**L** 23–24	0–1	Soldier Field	55,614
2	September 13	at Pittsburgh Steelers	**L** 12–17	0–2	Three Rivers Stadium	59,084
3	September 20	at **Tampa Bay Buccaneers**	**L** 15–27	0–3	Raymond James Stadium	64,328
4	September 27	**Minnesota Vikings**	**L** 28–31	0–4	Soldier Field	57,783
5	October 4	**Detroit Lions**	**W** 31–27	1–4	Soldier Field	66,944
6	October 11	at Arizona Cardinals	**L** 7–20	1–5	Sun Devil Stadium	50,495
7	October 18	Dallas Cowboys	**W** 13–12	2–5	Soldier Field	59,201
8	October 25	at Tennessee Oilers	**W** 23–20	3–5	Vanderbilt Stadium	40,089
9	Bye					
10	November 8	St. Louis Rams	**L** 12–20	3–6	Soldier Field	50,263
11	November 15	at **Detroit Lions**	**L** 3–26	3–7	Pontiac Silverdome	63,152
12	November 22	at Atlanta Falcons	**L** 13–20	3–8	Georgia Dome	60,804
13	November 29	**Tampa Bay Buccaneers**	**L** 17–31	3–9	Soldier Field	51,938
14	December 6	at **Minnesota Vikings**	**L** 22–48	3–10	Hubert H. Humphrey Metrodome	64,247
15	December 13	at **Green Bay Packers**	**L** 20–26	3–11	Lambeau Field	59,813
16	December 20	Baltimore Ravens	**W** 24–3	4–11	Soldier Field	40,853
17	December 27	**Green Bay Packers**	**L** 13–16	4–12	Soldier Field	58,393
Note: Intra-division opponents are in **bold** text.

=== Game summaries ===
==== Week 4: vs Minnesota Vikings ====
Week 4: Minnesota Vikings at Chicago Bears – Game summary

Quarter	1	2	3	4	Total
**Vikings**	7	3	14	7	**31**
Bears	7	14	0	7	**28**

at Soldier Field, Chicago, Illinois

- Date: September 27
- Game time: 3:15 p.m. CT
- Game weather: Partly sunny, 74 °F (23 °C)
- Game attendance: 57,783
- Referee: Ed Hochuli (85)
- TV announcers (FOX): Tim Ryan, Ronnie Lott, Bill Maas
- Recap, Game Book

Game information

**First quarter**

- MIN – Robert Smith 67-yard pass from Randall Cunningham (Gary Anderson kick), 12:43. Vikings 7–0. **Drive: 5 plays, 81 yards, 2:17.**
- CHI – Bobby Engram 33-yard pass from Erik Kramer (Jeff Jaeger kick), 9:04. Tied 7–7. **Drive: 7 plays, 84 yards, 3:39.**

**Second quarter**

- MIN – Gary Anderson 50-yard field goal, 8:38. Vikings 10–7. **Drive: 9 plays, 23 yards, 4:48.**
- CHI – Chris Penn 23-yard pass from Erik Kramer (Jeff Jaeger kick), 6:12. Bears 14–10. **Drive: 5 plays, 80 yards, 2:26.**
- CHI – Bobby Engram 4-yard pass from Erik Kramer (Jeff Jaeger kick), 0:28. Bears 21–10. **Drive: 7 plays, 66 yards, 4:18.**

**Third quarter**

- MIN – Andrew Glover 19-yard pass from Randall Cunningham (Gary Anderson kick), 11:24. Bears 21–17. **Drive: 5 plays, 34 yards, 1:49.**
- MIN – Cris Carter 35-yard pass from Randall Cunningham (Gary Anderson kick), 1:44. Vikings 24–21. **Drive: 4 plays, 68 yards, 1:34.**

**Fourth quarter**

- MIN – Randy Moss 44-yard pass from Randall Cunningham (Gary Anderson kick), 10:06. Vikings 31–21. **Drive: 1 play, 44 yards, 0:07.**
- CHI – Ryan Wetnight 19-yard pass from Erik Kramer (Jeff Jaeger kick), 1:53. Vikings 31–28. **Drive: 6 plays, 82 yards, 0:45.**

**Top passers**

- MIN – Randall Cunningham – 16/25, 275 yards, 4 TD
- CHI – Erik Kramer – 25/39, 372 yards, 4 TD, INT

**Top rushers**

- MIN – Robert Smith – 19 rushes, 76 yards
- CHI – Edgar Bennett – 11 rushes, 47 yards

**Top receivers**

- MIN – Robert Smith – 2 receptions, 83 yards, TD
- CHI – Bobby Engram – 6 receptions, 123 yards, 2 TD

=== Standings ===
NFC Central
	W	L	T	PCT	PF	PA	STK
^{(1)} Minnesota Vikings	15	1	0	.938	556	296	W8
^{(5)} Green Bay Packers	11	5	0	.688	408	319	W3
Tampa Bay Buccaneers	8	8	0	.500	314	295	W1
Detroit Lions	5	11	0	.313	306	378	L4
Chicago Bears	4	12	0	.250	276	368	L1
