= Duane Hawthorne =

American football player (born 1976)

No. 38, 43
- Position: Cornerback

Personal information
- Born: August 26, 1976 (age 50); St. Louis, Missouri, U.S.
- Listed height: 5 ft 10 in (1.78 m)
- Listed weight: 175 lb (79 kg)

Career information
- High school: Ladue Horton Watkins (Ladue, Missouri)
- College: Northern Illinois
- NFL draft: 1999: undrafted

Career history
- Dallas Cowboys (1999–2002); → Scottish Claymores (2000); San Francisco 49ers (2002)

Awards and highlights
- Second-team All-MAC (1998); NIU Defensive MVP (1998); NFL Europe co-defensive MVP (2000); All-NFL Europe (2000)

Career NFL statistics
- Games played: 56
- Starts: 16
- Tackles: 86
- Interceptions: 6
- Stats at Pro Football Reference

Duane Hawthorne (born August 26, 1976) is an American former professional football player who was a cornerback in the National Football League (NFL) for the Dallas Cowboys and San Francisco 49ers. He also was a member of the Scottish Claymores in NFL Europe. He played college football for the Northern Illinois Huskies.

== Early life ==
Hawthorne attended Ladue Horton Watkins High School, where he was a two-way player. As a senior quarterback, he passed for 811 yards and 6 touchdowns, while rushing for 748 yards and 6 touchdowns. He had 102 tackles, 5 interceptions and 7 passes defensed as a cornerback. He received All-Suburban East Conference, All-district and All-metro honors.

Hawthorne also practiced track and basketball, winning the conference's 400 metres competition.

== College career ==
Hawthorne accepted a football scholarship from Northern Illinois University. As a freshman, he was a backup cornerback, tallying 16 tackles. He had 8 tackles, one pass defensed, one forced fumble in only eight snaps against the third ranked University of Florida.

He was named a starter mid-way through his sophomore season, registering 40 tackles, one tackle for loss, 2 interceptions (second on the team) and 7 passes defensed. He had 2 tackles and 2 interceptions against Arkansas State University.

As a junior, he posted 45 tackles, 3 interceptions and 5 passes defensed. He had 5 tackles and 2 interceptions against North Carolina State University.

As a senior, he recorded 62 tackles (fifth on the team), 4 tackles for loss, 4 interceptions, 10 passes defensed, 2 forced fumbles and 2 fumble recoveries. He finished his college career with 30 starts, 166 tackles, 9 interceptions and 22 passes defensed.

== Professional career ==
=== Dallas Cowboys ===
Hawthorne was signed as an undrafted free agent by the Dallas Cowboys after the 1999 NFL draft on April 23. He surprised many observers by making the team, taking advantage of opportunities created by injuries to cornerbacks Kevin Smith and Deion Sanders. He collected 27 tackles, 3 interceptions (second on the team), 7 passes defensed and 7 special teams tackles, while playing in nickel and dime packages. His 3 interceptions were the most by a Cowboys rookie since 1981.

In 2000 season, he was allocated to the Scottish Claymores of NFL Europe. He had a strong showing there, including being named NFL Europe co-defensive MVP, All-NFL Europe, helped his team reach World Bowl 2000, while making 38 tackles, 18 passes defensed and tying for the league lead with 4 interceptions. When he returned to the Cowboys, he was worn down from all of his previous football activity and wasn't as effective, finishing with only one tackle, 2 passes defensed, one forced fumble and 6 special teams tackles.

In 2001, he was named the starter at left cornerback over Izell Reese in the seventh game of the season against the Arizona Cardinals. He recorded 72 tackles (sixth on the team), 54 solo tackles (fourth on the team), 2 interceptions, 9 passes defensed and 3 special teams tackles.

In 2002, he started 5 games, but hamstring and knee injuries opened the door for rookie Derek Ross to replace him. He registered 5 starts in 10 games, 25 tackles, one interception and 4 passes defensed, before being waived on December 8, 2002.

=== San Francisco 49ers ===
On December 11, 2002, he was signed by the San Francisco 49ers as insurance for depth purposes. He didn't play until being forced into action during the playoff loss against the Tampa Bay Buccaneers.

== Personal life ==
Hawthorne was a football coach at University City High School and at Hazelwood West High School in St. Louis, Missouri. He is currently an elementary physical education teacher
