= Larry Fitzpatrick =

American gridiron football player (born 1976)

No. 99, 98
- Position: Defensive lineman

Personal information
- Born: August 17, 1976 (age 50); Detroit, Michigan, U.S.
- Listed height: 6 ft 4 in (1.93 m)
- Listed weight: 275 lb (125 kg)

Career information
- High school: Ypsilanti (MI) Willow Run
- College: Illinois State (1994–1997)
- NFL draft: 1998: undrafted

Career history
- Baltimore Ravens (1998); Rhein Fire (2000); Denver Broncos (2000)*; Chicago Enforcers (2001); New Orleans Saints (2001)*; San Francisco 49ers (2001)*; Hamilton Tiger-Cats (2001–2002)
- * Offseason or practice squad member only

Awards and highlights
- World Bowl champion (2000)

Larry Talye Fitzpatrick (born August 17, 1976) is an American former professional football defensive lineman who played for the Hamilton Tiger-Cats of the Canadian Football League (CFL), the Chicago Enforcers of the XFL, and the Rhein Fire of NFL Europe. He played college football at Illinois State University. He was also a member of the Baltimore Ravens, Denver Broncos, New Orleans Saints, and San Francisco 49ers of the National Football League (NFL).

== Early life and college ==
Larry Talye Fitzpatrick was born on August 17, 1976, in Detroit, Michigan. He attended Willow Run High School in Ypsilanti, Michigan.

Fitzpatrick was a four-year letterman for the Illinois State Redbirds of Illinois State University from 1994 to 1997. He earned second-team All-Gateway Conference honors while at Illinois State.

== Professional career ==
After going undrafted in the 1998 NFL draft, Fitzpatrick signed with the Baltimore Ravens on April 24, 1998. He was released on September 3 and signed to the team's practice squad the next day. He was promoted to the active roster on December 18 but did not appear in any games for the Ravens that season. Fitzpatrick was released on September 7, 1999.

Fitzpatrick played for the Rhein Fire of NFL Europe during the 2000 NFL Europe season, recording 14 defensive tackles, four sacks, and one pass breakup. The Fire finished the season with a 7–3 record and won World Bowl 2000 against the Scottish Claymores.

He was signed by the Denver Broncos on July 21, 2000, but later released on August 27, 2000.

Fitzpatrick was selected by the Chicago Enforcers of the XFL in the 16th round, with the 121st overall pick, of the 2001 XFL draft. He played in all ten games, starting eight, for the Enforcers in 2001, totaling 33 tackles and 5.5 sacks. The Enforcers went 5–5 record and lost in the playoffs to the Los Angeles Xtreme.

After the end of the XFL season, he signed with the New Orleans Saints on April 26, 2001. He was released on August 28, 2001.

Fitzpatrick was claimed off waivers by the San Francisco 49ers on August 29, 2001. He was released shortly thereafter on September 3, 2001.

Fitzpatrick then signed with the Hamilton Tiger-Cats of the Canadian Football League (CFL) in October 2001. He played in five games, all starts, for Hamilton during the 2001 CFL season, accumulating seven defensive tackles, one sack, and one pass breakup. He dressed in all 18 games for the Tiger-Cats in 2002, recording 36 defensive tackles, three sacks, one pass breakup, and one fumble recovery.
