= Pete Elezovic =

American football player (born 1971)

No. 3, 13, 2, 4, 1, 7
- Position: Placekicker

Personal information
- Born: June 28, 1971 (age 55); Wayne, Michigan, U.S.
- Listed height: 6 ft 1 in (1.85 m)
- Listed weight: 188 lb (85 kg)

Career information
- High school: Detroit Catholic Central (Novi, Michigan)
- College: Michigan (1990–1993)

Career history
- Albany Firebirds (1996–1998); Washington Redskins (1997)*; Tampa Bay Buccaneers (1998–1999)*; Washington Redskins (2000)*; Scottish Claymores (2000)*; Barcelona Dragons (2000); Rhein Fire (2000); Chicago Rush (2001); Buffalo Destroyers (2001); Chicago Rush (2001); Carolina Cobras (2002); Tampa Bay Storm (2002–2003); New York Dragons (2003–2004)
- * Offseason or practice squad member only

Awards and highlights
- Second-team All-Arena (1996); AFL Kicker of the Year (1996)

Career AFL statistics
- FG made: 54
- FG att: 121
- PAT made: 298
- PAT att: 355
- Tackles: 30.5
- Stats at ArenaFan.com

Peter Elezovic (born June 28, 1971) is an American former professional football placekicker who played seven seasons in the Arena Football League (AFL) with the Albany Firebirds, Chicago Rush, Buffalo Destroyers, Carolina Cobras, Tampa Bay Storm, and New York Dragons. He played college football at the University of Michigan. He was also a member of the Washington Redskins, Tampa Bay Buccaneers, Scottish Claymores, Barcelona Dragons and Rhein Fire.

== Early life and college ==
Peter Elezovic was born on June 28, 1971, in Wayne, Michigan. He attended Detroit Catholic Central High School in Novi, Michigan.

Elezovic was a member of the Michigan Wolverines of the University of Michigan from 1990 to 1993 and a two-year letterman from 1992 to 1993.

== Professional career ==
Elezovic played for the Albany Firebirds of the Arena Football League (AFL) from 1996 to 1998, earning second-team All-Arena and AFL Kicker of the Year honors in 1996.

Elezovic was a member of the Washington Redskins of the National Football League (NFL) during the 1997 off-season.

Elezovic signed with the Tampa Bay Buccaneers of the NFL in July 1998. He was released by the Buccaneers before the start of the season. He re-signed with the team at the end of the 1998 season. He was leased by the Buccaneers in August 1999.

Elezovic was signed by the Redskins again during the 2000 off-season. He was allocated to the Scottish Claymores of NFL Europe before being sent to the Barcelona Dragons. He was traded to the Rhein Fire in May 2000. Elezovic was released by the Redskins on July 10 and re-signed by the team on July 28, 2000. He was released by the Redskins on August 22, 2000.

Elezovic played for the Chicago Rush of the AFL during the 2000 season. He was released by the Rush on March 26, 2001.

Elezovic was awarded to the Buffalo Destroyers on waivers on March 27, 2001. He was released by the Destroyers on May 1, 2001.

Elezovic was awarded to the Rush on waivers on May 2, 2001.

Elezovic signed with the AFL's Carolina Cobras on June 26, 2002. He was released by the Cobras on July 1, 2002.

Elezovic was signed by the Tampa Bay Storm of the AFL on July 25, 2002. He was released by the Storm on February 20, 2003.

Elezovic signed with the New York Dragons of the AFL on March 9, 2003. He was released by the Dragons on February 24, 2004.
