= Jeff Ogden =

American football player (born 1975)

No. 82, 85, 84, 88, 87
- Positions: Wide receiver, return specialist

Personal information
- Born: February 22, 1975 (age 51); Snohomish, Washington, U.S.
- Listed height: 6 ft 0 in (1.83 m)
- Listed weight: 190 lb (86 kg)

Career information
- High school: Snohomish
- College: Eastern Washington
- NFL draft: 1998: undrafted

Career history
- Dallas Cowboys (1998–1999); → Rhein Fire (2000); Miami Dolphins (2000–2001); Baltimore Ravens (2002)

Awards and highlights
- Second-team Division I-AA All-American (1997); All-Big Sky (1997); All-NFL Europe (2000); World Bowl champion (2000)

Career NFL statistics
- Receptions: 28
- Receiving yards: 304
- Kickoff return yards: 317
- Punt return yards: 749
- Touchdowns: 2
- Stats at Pro Football Reference

Jeffrey Matthew Ogden (born February 22, 1975) is an American former professional football player who was a wide receiver, kickoff and punt returner in the National Football League (NFL) for the Dallas Cowboys, Miami Dolphins and Baltimore Ravens. He played college football for the Eastern Washington Eagles.

== Early life ==
Ogden was born with a problem in his foot that led specialists to believe that he would have a permanent limp. He eventually overcame the physical problem and turned into a top-ranked youth gymnast.

He attended Snohomish High School, where he played as wide receiver, quarterback, running back and defensive back in American football. He also lettered in track and basketball.

== College career ==
Following one year spent as a pole vaulter at Clackamas Community College, he walked-on at Eastern Washington University.

As a freshman, he appeared in 4 games, collecting one reception for 4 yards. As a sophomore, he suffered a season-ending back injury after starting the first three games, finishing with 2 receptions for 36 yards. As a junior, he appeared in 10 games, making 10 receptions for 216 yards.

Although he only had 13 receptions going into his senior year, he would start 14 games at wide receiver for the 1997 football team that compiled a 12-2 record, won the Big Sky Conference title and advanced to the semifinals of the Division I-AA playoffs. He led the team with 57 receptions for 1,148 yards (school record) and 13 receiving touchdown]s (tied school record). He also practiced gymnastics.

In 2008, he was named to Eastern Washington's 100-for-100 all-time team, commemorating the best football players in its 100-year history. In 2018, he was inducted into the Eastern Washington Athletics Hall of Fame.

== Professional career ==
=== Dallas Cowboys ===
Ogden was signed as an undrafted free agent by the Dallas Cowboys after the 1998 NFL draft. Ogden got to practice with Cowboy legends including Deion Sanders, Troy Aikman, Michael Irvin, and Emmitt Smith. Sanders and Ogden went head-to-head in practice plenty of times, so he was given the nickname "Largent" in reference to Hall of Famer Steve Largent. He ended up making the roster, even though he had a quadriceps injury that sidelined him for 10 practices.

He had some notable preseason performances, but never developed into a consistent wide receiver. In the regular season, he usually was the team's fifth receiver and played mostly on special teams, making 10 tackles (tied for sixth on the team). In 1999, he returned 12 kickoffs for a 21-yard average and made five special teams tackles.

In 2000, he was allocated to the Rhein Fire of NFL Europe, where he ranked fifth in the league with 44 receptions for 635 yards, despite missing the last two games with a sprained right foot. He also had 7 touchdowns, while helping the team finish with the league's best record (7-3) and winning World Bowl 2000. He returned to the Cowboys with the sprained foot and later injured the left one, which caused him to miss most of training camp. On August 22, he was traded to the Miami Dolphins in exchange for a seventh round draft choice, which the team later used to select Pete Hunter.

=== Miami Dolphins ===
In 2000, he reunited with offensive coordinator Chan Gailey, who was his head coach with the Dallas Cowboys and also found a niche as a returner. Against the Green Bay Packers, he returned a punt for an 81-yard touchdown, the third-longest punt return in team history. He also finished the season with a league leading and franchise single-season record 17-yard punt return average. In 2001, his 11.8-yard punt return average ranked eighth in the NFL.

On September 1, 2002, he was waived after being passed on the depth chart by Albert Johnson. He left as the Dolphins' all-time team leader in punt return average (13.7-yard) and third all-time in punt return yards (700 yards).

=== Baltimore Ravens ===
On September 10, 2002, he was signed as a free agent by the Baltimore Ravens to play on special teams. He appeared in 3 games and was declared inactive in 10, while sharing punt return duties with Chris McAlister. He wasn't re-signed at the end of the season.

Ogden's most productive season as a wide receiver was in 1999, when he caught 12 passes for 144 yards in 10 games. He caught his only touchdown reception in 2001. He ended his professional career playing in 67 games, registering 28 receptions for 304 yards and one touchdown.

== Personal life ==
He owns a gym in Pittsburgh. He was an assistant coach in NFL Europe and at Duquesne University. Ogden appeared in seasons 7 and 8 of the Bravo show The Millionaire Matchmaker, where he sought a date.

Ogden published his first and only book (an autobiography) on December 1, 2021, titled Tackle Life Head On. The book covers symptoms common to chronic traumatic encephalopathy including memory loss, sleep deprivation, and mental illness. He stated that the book was originally written for his daughter, so she can know about his life before he himself forgets about it.
