= Noel Scarlett =

American gridiron football player (1974–2021)

No. 68
- Position: Defensive tackle

Personal information
- Born: January 21, 1974 (age 52); Atlanta, Georgia, U.S.
- Died: September 1, 2021 (aged 47)
- Listed height: 6 ft 3 in (1.91 m)
- Listed weight: 320 lb (145 kg)

Career information
- High school: Elbert (GA)
- College: Langston
- NFL draft: 1999: 7th round, 236th overall pick

Career history
- Minnesota Vikings (1999)*; New England Patriots (1999–2000)*; → Scottish Claymores (2000); Miami Dolphins (2000)*; Kansas City Chiefs (2000)*; Dallas Cowboys (2000); Tulsa Talons (2002); Minnesota Vikings (2002)*; Calgary Stampeders (2003)*
- * Offseason or practice squad member only

Career NFL statistics
- Games played: 1
- Stats at Pro Football Reference

Noel Scarlett (born January 21, 1974 – September 1, 2021) was an American professional football defensive tackle in the National Football League (NFL) for the New England Patriots, Kansas City Chiefs and Dallas Cowboys. He also was a member of the Scottish Claymores in NFL Europe. He played college football at Langston University.

== Early life and college ==
Scarlett attended Elbert County High School, where he was a two-way lineman. As a junior, he received All-area and Atlanta Journal-Constitution Super Senior honors. As a senior, he didn't play football because of trouble with the law.

He worked for 2 years in a produce plant making his way up to a supervisor's role, before accepting a football scholarship from NAIA Langston University. As a sophomore he was named a starter at defensive tackle, tallying 40 tackles (6 for loss) and 2 sacks. As a junior, he posted 40 tackles and 6 sacks.

As a senior, he led the team with a career-high 9.5 sacks and 9 tackles for loss. He had 3 sacks against Oklahoma Panhandle State University. He finished his college career with 120 tackles (93 solo), 19 tackles for loss and 17.5 sacks.

== Professional career ==
=== Minnesota Vikings (first stint) ===
Scarlett was selected by the Minnesota Vikings in the seventh round (236th overall) of the 1999 NFL draft. He was waived on September 5.

=== New England Patriots ===
On December 22, 1999, he was signed by the New England Patriots to their practice squad. He was released on December 29. He was re-signed on January 5, 2000.

In 2000, he was allocated to the Scottish Claymores of NFL Europe. He recorded 20 tackles and 2.5 sacks for a defense that gave up only 76.3 rushing yards-per-game and helped the team reach World Bowl 2000. He was released by the Patriots on August 1.

=== Miami Dolphins ===
On August 3, 2000, he was signed as a free agent by the Miami Dolphins. He was cut on August 14.

=== Kansas City Chiefs ===
On October 25, he was signed by the Kansas City Chiefs to their practice squad.

=== Dallas Cowboys ===
On December 15, 2000, he was signed by the Dallas Cowboys from the Chiefs' practice squad, who were having injury problems on the defensive line. He appeared as a backup in the season finale against the Tennessee Titans. He was released on August 6, 2001.

=== Tulsa Talons ===
In 2002, he signed with the Tulsa Talons of the AF2. He appeared in 5 games, registering 8 tackles (6 solo), one tackle for loss, one sack, 2 forced fumbles and one fumble recovery.

=== Minnesota Vikings (second stint) ===
In July 2002, he was signed as a free agent by the Minnesota Vikings. He was released on August 17.

=== Calgary Stampeders ===
In 2003, he signed with the Calgary Stampeders in the Canadian Football League. He was released on June 5.

== Coaching career ==
In 2016, he was a defensive line coach at Southwest Christian School in Fort Worth, Texas. In 2017, he was an intern defensive line assistant with the Minnesota Vikings during training camp. In 2017, he was named the defensive coordinator at Coram Deo Academy. He served as an assistant coach for the Texas College Steers.
