= Galen Hall =

American football player and coach (born 1940)

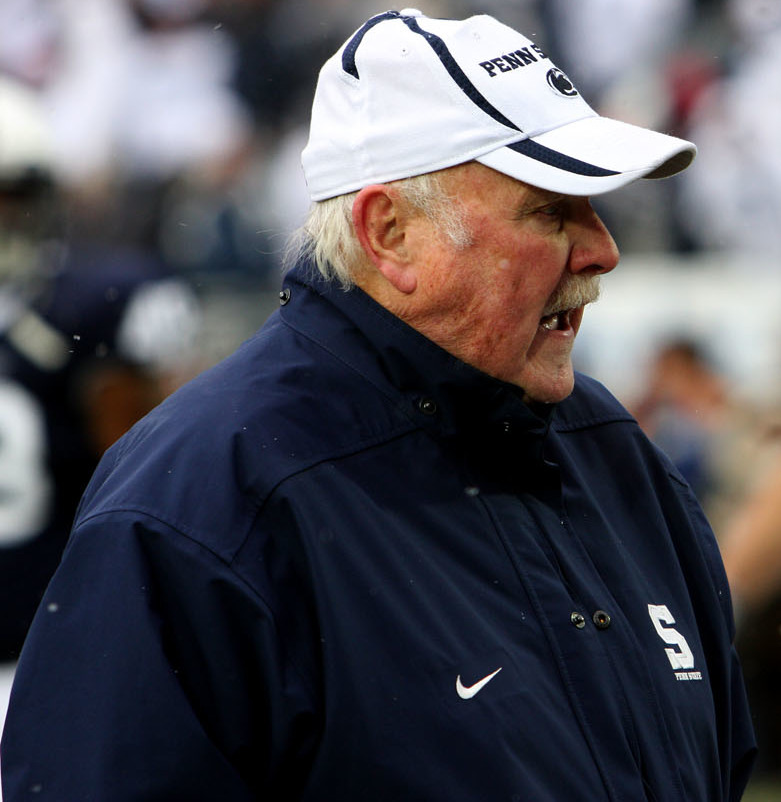
- Hall on the Penn State sidelines in November 2008

Biographical details
- Born: August 14, 1940 (age 86); Altoona, Pennsylvania, U.S.

Playing career
- 1959–1961: Penn State
- 1962: Washington Redskins
- 1963: New York Jets
- Position: Quarterback

Coaching career (HC unless noted)
- 1964–1965: West Virginia (TE)
- 1966–1972: Oklahoma (WR)
- 1973–1983: Oklahoma (OC)
- 1984: Florida (OC)
- 1984–1989: Florida
- 1991: Orlando Thunder (OC)
- 1992: Orlando Thunder
- 1994: Charlotte Rage
- 1995–2000: Rhein Fire
- 2001: Orlando Rage
- 2002: Dallas Cowboys (RB)
- 2004–2011: Penn State (OC/RB)

Head coaching record
- Overall: 40–18–1 (college)

Accomplishments and honors

Championships
- 2 (NFL Europe)

Awards
- Florida–Georgia Hall of Fame: US Bowl Outstanding Player (1962); SEC Coach of the Year (1984); 3× NFL Europe Coach of the Year; XFL Coach of the year (2001); First-team All-Eastern (1961)

Galen Samuel Hall (born August 14, 1940) is a retired American college and professional football coach and player. He is a native of Pennsylvania, and an alumnus of Penn State University, where he played college football. Hall was previously the offensive coordinator at the University of Oklahoma and the University of Florida, and the head coach of the University of Florida, the Orlando Thunder, the Rhein Fire, and the XFL's Orlando Rage. He most recently served as the offensive coordinator at his alma mater, Penn State.

== Early life and education ==
Hall was born in Altoona, Pennsylvania, in 1940, and grew up in Williamsburg, Pennsylvania. He was raised by his grandparents, following the death of his father several months before he was born.

He attended Penn State University in State College, Pennsylvania, where he was the starting quarterback for coach Rip Engle's Nittany Lions in 1960 and 1961. He led the Nittany Lions to a combined 15–6 record and victories in the 1960 Liberty Bowl and 1961 Gator Bowl. He was named the outstanding player in the sole playing of the U.S. Bowl, a college all-star game played in Washington, DC in 1962.

== Professional football career ==
Hall signed as a backup quarterback with the Washington Redskins of the National Football League (NFL) in 1962 and appeared in three games. He signed with the New York Jets of the American Football League (AFL) in 1963 and appeared in 13 games, including his only two career starts at the end of the campaign as Coach Weeb Ewbank attempted to jumpstart the slumping squad. Hall's first professional start came on December 14 against the Buffalo Bills, and he quickly threw a 73-yard touchdown pass to Don Maynard for what turned out to be the last touchdown pass in the history of the Polo Grounds. It would also be the last touchdown pass of Hall's short pro career, as he threw five interceptions over his two starts and the Jets lost both games. After the season, Hall decided to return to the college game as an assistant coach.

== Coaching career ==
After retiring as a player, Hall was hired as an offensive assistant for the West Virginia Mountaineers, where he coached wide receivers and tight ends during the 1964 and 1965 seasons.

=== Oklahoma ===
In 1966, Hall joined the staff as a receivers coach under head coach Jim Mackenzie at Oklahoma. Hall was an assistant with the program for the next 17 years under three head coaches – Mackenzie, Chuck Fairbanks, and Barry Switzer. Switzer had been the Sooners' offensive coordinator before taking the head job for the 1973 season, and he promoted Hall to fill his old position.

Hall remained Oklahoma's offensive coordinator for a decade, during which time they boasted one of the most prolific offenses in college football. Using a run-heavy wishbone offense, the Sooners won two straight national championships (1974 and 1975), eight straight Big 8 championships, and produced Heisman Trophy-winning]] running back Billy Sims under Hall and Switzer.

After a disappointing season in 1983, Oklahoma retained head coach Barry Switzer while replacing most of his staff, including Hall.

=== Florida ===
==== 1984 and 1985 seasons ====
After leaving Oklahoma, Hall was quickly hired as the offensive coordinator for the Florida Gators under head coach Charlie Pell replacing Mike Shanahan, who had left Florida for the NFL. Unlike the option attacks he had run at Oklahoma, Hall was tasked with installing a balanced I-formation offense for the 1984 season to take advantage of the skills of senior quarterback Dale Dorminy and a veteran offensive line.

However, a sequence of events early in the season drastically changed the situation. Injuries on the practice field thrust redshirt freshman Kerwin Bell into the starting quarterback position a few days before the season opener, forcing Hall to adjust his gameplans and playcalling. Then, between the third and fourth games, Pell was fired after an NCAA investigation alleged that he and his staff had committed 107 violations of NCAA rules over the previous few seasons. Hall, who had not been at Florida when the violations occurred, was named interim head coach by athletic director Bill Carr on September 17.

The Gators won the remaining eight games on their schedule under Hall, including big wins over arch-rivals Georgia, Auburn, and Florida State, and finished with a 9–1–1 record. By virtue of an undefeated 5–0–1 conference record, Florida won its first-ever Southeastern Conference (SEC) football championship. The team finished the season ranked No. 3 in the AP poll, the team's highest ever ranking up to that time. However, the SEC refused to allow the Gators to play in the Sugar Bowl; LSU went in their place. Two weeks after the end of the season, the NCAA slapped the Gators with two years' probation (a third year was later suspended) and banned them from bowl games and live television in 1985 and 1986. The most damaging sanction in the long run, however, was a limit of 20 new scholarships in 1985 and 1986, and a reduction to 85 total scholarships in 1985 and 75 in 1986. Nonetheless, the Gators were crowned national champions by several minor polls, including that of The New York Times. Hall was named the Associated Press Coach of the Year and university president Marshall Criser named him the permanent head coach at the end of the season.

On May 30, 1985, the SEC university presidents voted 6–4 to vacate Florida's 1984 SEC title and make the team ineligible for the conference title during the upcoming 1985 and 1986 seasons because of the rule violations committed under Pell, overturning an executive committee ruling that allowed the Gators to keep their 1984 title. The decision drew much anger from Criser and Gator players and fans due to its retroactive nature.

Despite the sanctions, Hall's 1985 Gators would again go 9–1–1 on the field and tie for the SEC lead with a 5–1 conference record, but could not claim the conference title because of NCAA and SEC probation.

==== 1986 to 1989 seasons ====
The 1984 and 1985 seasons are remembered as "Best in the SEC" years for Florida football. However, Hall's subsequent Gators teams were hamstrung by the severe sanctions imposed for violations under Pell. The most damaging sanctions in the long run were scholarship restrictions that severely limited the team's recruiting; Hall's first two recruiting classes only had 25 players. The sanctions began taking their full effect midway through Hall's tenure; between 1986 and 1989, Hall's Gators never won more than seven games in a season, and never won more than four games in SEC play. Even with the burden of the sanctions hanging over them, Hall's teams remained competitive; they never suffered a losing season overall and only had one losing SEC record. Hall's teams typically featured a powerful rushing attack (especially with record-setting running back Emmitt Smith) and strong defense.

Interim university president Robert A. Bryan forced Hall's resignation in the middle of the 1989 season during another investigation of possible NCAA rule violations. The new allegations were primarily related to Hall paying several of his assistants out of his own pocket (violating an NCAA rule that capped salaries, a rule later found to be in violation of federal antitrust laws) as well as paying the legal expenses related to the child-support obligations of one of his players, allegations that he still denies. The NCAA ultimately slapped the Gators with two years' probation, and banned them from bowl consideration for the 1990 season. It deemed Hall's alleged violations serious enough that it would have kicked the Gators off live television during the 1990 season as well had school officials not forced Hall's resignation. Hall would never get another college head coaching job.

=== Professional coaching ===
==== Orlando Thunder (WLAF) ====
Hall continued his coaching career in 1991 as the offensive coordinator of the Orlando Thunder, a charter franchise of the new World League of American Football (WLAF), where he was reunited with former Florida Gator quarterback Kerwin Bell. Hall was promoted to head coach in 1992 and coached the Thunder to an 8–2 record and a berth in World Bowl II, for which he was named WLAF coach of the year. The Orlando franchise folded after the season along with all WLAF teams in North America. In 1994, Hall coached the Charlotte Rage of the Arena Football League to a 5–7 record, and a spot in the playoffs.

==== Rhein Fire ====
From 1995 to 2000, Hall served as head coach for the Rhein Fire, a new franchise of NFL Europe, which was a reconfigured WLAF consisting exclusively of teams based in Europe. Hall won two NFL Europe championships (1998 and 2000) and two coach of the year awards with the Fire and was the second-winningest coach in WLAF/NFL Europe history with forty-four victories.

==== Orlando Rage ====
In 2001, Hall returned to coaching in the US where he was named head coach of the XFL's Orlando Rage. The Rage boasting a league-best 8–2 regular season record and Hall was named XFL Coach of the Year.

The XFL folded after a single season, and in 2002, Hall joined the staff of the NFL's Dallas Cowboys as running backs coach, where he was reunited with former Florida Gator running back Emmitt Smith.

=== Penn State ===
In late 2004, Hall returned to his alma mater, Penn State, to become the offensive coordinator and running backs coach under head coach Joe Paterno, who had been an assistant coach at Penn State during his college days. It was Hall's first collegiate job of any sort since being pushed out at Florida 15 years earlier. However, Paterno had no qualms about hiring him, saying that Hall was "a good coach who got screwed."

The Nittany Lions were coming off of consecutive losing seasons, but finished the 2005 slate with an 11–1 record and a share of the Big Ten Conference title behind a much-improved offensive attack; they ended that season with an Orange Bowl victory. They would win nine games in both 2006 and 2007, and won the conference title in 2008 with another 11–1 record, earning a trip to the Rose Bowl and fielding one of the top offenses in college football.

==== Retirement ====
Paterno was ousted late in the 2011 season due to fallout from the Penn State child sex abuse scandal. Though Hall had no connection to the scandal, new head coach Bill O'Brien opted to replace most of Paterno's coaching staff, including Hall. In 2015, Hall and some of Paterno's other former assistant coaches filed suit against Penn State, claiming that the school did not fulfill their employment contracts by stopping payment on their severance packages.

After leaving Penn State, Hall retired to Groveland, Florida.

== Head coaching record ==
=== College ===
Year	Team	Overall	Conference	Standing	Bowl/playoffs	Coaches^{#}	AP^{°}
Florida Gators (Southeastern Conference) (1984–1989)
1984	Florida	8–0 (Note: Charley Pell served as Florida's head coach for the first three games of the 1984 season before resigning. Hall was appointed interim head coach for the remainder of the year. Florida finished the season with an overall record of 9–1–1 and a mark of 5–0–1 in conference play, winning the Southeastern Conference (SEC) title. However, due to NCAA sanctions, Florida was banned from postseason play and vacated the SEC title in 1985.)	5–0	1st		7	3
1985	Florida	9–1–1	5–1	T–1st (Note: Due to NCAA sanctions, Florida was banned ineligible for the Southeastern Conference title, postseason play, and the Coaches poll during the 1985 season.)			5
1986	Florida	6–5	2–4	T–7th			
1987	Florida	6–6	3–3	6th	L Aloha		
1988	Florida	7–5	4–3	T–4th	W All-American		
1989	Florida	4–1 (Note: Hall served as Florida's head coach for the first five games of the 1989 season before resigning. Gary Darnell was appointed interim head coach for the remainder of the year. Florida finished the season with an overall record of 7–5 and a mark of 4–3 in conference play, placing in a three-way tie for fourth in the Southeastern Conference.)	2–1				
Florida:		40–18–1	21–12				
Total:		40–18–1					
^{#}Rankings from final Coaches Poll.; ^{°}Rankings from final AP Poll.

=== Professional ===
Team	Year	Regular season					Postseason			
Team	Year	Won	Lost	Ties	Win %	Finish	Won	Lost	Win %	Result
ORT	1992	8	2	0	.800	1st in N. American East Div.	1	1	.500	Lost World Bowl II to Sacramento Surge; WLAF Coach of the Year
RHE	1995	4	6	0	.400	5th in league	–	–	–	
RHE	1996	3	7	0	.300	6th in league	–	–	–	
RHE	1997	7	3	0	.700	1st in league	1	1	.500	Lost World Bowl V to Barcelona Dragons
RHE	1998	7	3	0	.700	1st in league	2	0	1.000	Won World Bowl VI over Frankfurt Galaxy; NFL Europe Coach of the Year
RHE	1999	6	4	0	.600	3rd in league	–	–	–	–
RHE	2000	7	3	0	.700	1st in league	1	0	1.000	Won World Bowl VIII over Scottish Claymores; NFL Europe Coach of the Year
Total (WLAF/NFLE)		42	28	0	.600		5	2	.714	2 League Championships; 3 Coach of the Year Awards
CHR	1994	5	7	0	.417	3rd in East	–	–	–	
ORR	2001	8	2	0	.800	1st in Eastern Div.	0	1	.000	XFL Coach of the Year
Total		55	37	0	.598		5	3	.625	2 League Championships; 4 Coach of the Year Awards

== See also ==
- List of American Football League players
- List of Pennsylvania State University people
