= Derrick Gardner (American football) =

American gridiron football player (born 1977)

No. 30, 31
- Position: Defensive back

Personal information
- Born: March 10, 1977 (age 49); Oakland, California, U.S.
- Listed height: 6 ft 0 in (1.83 m)
- Listed weight: 185 lb (84 kg)

Career information
- High school: Skyline (Oakland)
- College: California
- NFL draft: 1999: undrafted

Career history
- Atlanta Falcons (1999); Rhein Fire (2000); San Francisco Demons (2001)*; Rhein Fire (2001); Los Angeles Avengers (2002–2003)
- * Offseason or practice squad member only

Awards and highlights
- World Bowl champion (VIII)
- Stats at Pro Football Reference
- Stats at ArenaFan.com

Derrick A. Gardner (born March 10, 1977) is an American former professional football player who was a defensive back for one season with the Atlanta Falcons of the National Football League (NFL). He played college football for the California Golden Bears. He was also a member of the Rhein Fire, San Francisco Demons and Los Angeles Avengers.

== Early life ==
Gardner played high school football for the Skyline High School Titans. He earned player of the game honors in the California-Texas all-star game in 1995 after returning an interception 46 yards for a touchdown to win the game. He also earned all-state honors his senior year after recording five interceptions.

== College career ==
Gardner attended the University of California, Berkeley, and played for the California Golden Bears from 1995 to 1998. He led the Golden Bears in interceptions during his junior year with two. He started his last 31 games for Cal. Gardner also started a game as a true freshman in 1995 against the Stanford Cardinal. He scored a 72-yard fumble recovery touchdown against the Arizona State Sun Devils. He recorded 160 total tackles during his college career.

== Professional career ==
Gardner signed with the Atlanta Falcons of the National Football League (NFL) after going undrafted in the 1999 NFL draft. He played in seven games for the Falcons during the 1999 season after being activated from the practice roster in October. He was allocated to NFL Europe in 2000 to play for the Rhein Fire, winning World Bowl 2000. Gardner was a member of the San Francisco Demons of the XFL in 2001. He played for the Rhein Fire during the 2001 season. On July 5, 2002, he was signed to the practice squad of the Los Angeles Avengers of the Arena Football League. Gardner was promoted to the active roster on July 17, 2002. He was released by the Avengers on November 17, 2003.

== Coaching career ==
In 2005, Gardner became an assistant Secondary Coach at his high school alma mater, Skyline High School. After leaving his position in 2008, Gardner was named the Director of Football Operations for the East West Shrine Game in 2009. In 2010, Gardner became a Pro Scouting Intern for the Seattle Seahawks. In 2011, Gardner served as a Strength Training Program Leader at the University of California, Berkeley, which is his college alma mater. Since 2012, Gardner has been an Assistant Secondary Coach and then a Cornerbacks Coach under Head Coach John Beam at Laney College. Gardner's coaching role at Laney was featured during season 5 of Last Chance U on Netflix.
