= Central McClellion =

American football player (born 1975)

No. 29, 34, 27
- Position: Cornerback

Personal information
- Born: September 15, 1975 (age 51); Delray Beach, Florida, U.S.
- Listed height: 6 ft 0 in (1.83 m)
- Listed weight: 190 lb (86 kg)

Career information
- High school: Olympic Heights (Boca Raton, Florida)
- College: Ohio State (1994–1998)
- NFL draft: 1999: undrafted

Career history
- Cleveland Browns (1999)*; Scottish Claymores (2000); BC Lions (2000); Scottish Claymores (2001); Washington Redskins (2001); Kansas City Chiefs (2002); Toronto Argonauts (2004)*
- * Offseason or practice squad member only

Awards and highlights
- Grey Cup champion (2000)
- Stats at Pro Football Reference

Central Bernard McClellion (born September 15, 1975) is an American former professional football cornerback who played in the National Football League (NFL), Canadian Football League (CFL), and NFL Europe. He played college football at Ohio State University.

== Early life ==
Central Bernard McClellion was born on September 15, 1975, in Delray Beach, Florida. He played high school football at Olympic Heights Community High School in Boca Raton, Florida and was a three-year starter at defensive back. He had 11 interceptions as a junior. McClellion posted 82 total tackles and ten interceptions his senior year. He was also a two-year starter at wide receiver, catching six passes for 114 yards and one touchdown as a senior. Olympic Heights finished with a 10–1 record during both of McClellion's final two seasons. He also participated in track in high school.

== College career ==
McClellion played college football for the Ohio State Buckeyes of Ohio State University. He was redshirted in 1994 and was a four-year letterman from 1995 to 1998. He played in 47 games, starting three, during his college career, recording 56 solo tackles, 29 assisted tackles, one fumble recovery, and one interception that he returned 60 yards for a touchdown. He first majored in business at Ohio State before switching to criminology.

== Professional career ==
McClellion signed with the Cleveland Browns on April 23, 1999, after going undrafted in the 1999 NFL draft. During training camp, McClellion was taped to a goalpost as part of a rookie hazing ritual. McClellion was cut by the Browns on August 30, 1998.

In February 2000, McClellion was selected by the Scottish Claymores of NFL Europe in the third round of the 2000 NFL Europe draft. He played in five games for the Claymores during the 2000 NFL Europe season, recording 11 tackles, one interception, and three pass breakups. He missed part of the year due to injury. The Claymores advanced to World Bowl 2000 but lost to the Rhein Fire by a score of 13–10.

McClellion signed with the BC Lions of the Canadian Football League (CFL) on August 22, 2000. He dressed in 11 games for the Lions during the 2000 CFL season, totaling 35 defensive tackles, four special teams tackles, five interceptions, and three pass breakups. On November 26, 2000, the Lions beat the Montreal Alouettes in the 88th Grey Cup by a score of 28–26. McClellion had one tackle in the Grey Cup. He was released by the Lions on December 29, 2000.

McClellion started all ten games for the Scottish Claymores during the 2001 season, recording 27 tackles, one interception, and six pass breakups as the team finished 4–6.

McClellion was signed by the Washington Redskins on July 5, 2001. He was released on September 3 but signed to the team's practice squad on September 6. He was promoted to the active roster on September 26 and played in six games for the Redskins during the 2001 season, posting 12 solo tackles and two assisted tackles. McClellion was released on December 11, 2001, and signed to the practice squad again the next day.

McClellion became a free agent after the 2001 season and signed with the Kansas City Chiefs on January 30, 2002. He was placed on the physically unable to perform list on August 26, 2002, due to a knee injury and missed the rest of the season. He became a free agent after the 2002 season.

On May 4, 2004, it was reported that he had signed with the Toronto Argonauts of the CFL. He was released on June 9, 2004.

== Personal life ==
McClellion's son, Jarques McClellion, played college football at Florida State and Arkansas.
