= Ryan Neufeld =

American football player (born 1975)

No. 39, 83, 88, 89
- Position: Tight end

Personal information
- Born: November 22, 1975 (age 50); Los Gatos, California, U.S.
- Listed height: 6 ft 4 in (1.93 m)
- Listed weight: 250 lb (113 kg)

Career information
- High school: Live Oak (Morgan Hill, California)
- College: UCLA
- NFL draft: 1999: undrafted

Career history
- Dallas Cowboys (1999); → Rhein Fire (2000); Miami Dolphins (2000)*; Jacksonville Jaguars (2000); Seattle Seahawks (2002)*; Buffalo Bills (2003–2007); Florida Tuskers (2009); Omaha Nighthawks (2010)
- * Offseason or practice squad member only

Awards and highlights
- World Bowl champion (VIII)

Career NFL statistics
- Receptions: 13
- Receiving yards: 129
- Receiving touchdowns: 1
- Stats at Pro Football Reference

Ryan Matthew Neufeld (born November 22, 1975) is an American former professional football player who was a tight end in the National Football League (NFL) for the Dallas Cowboys, Jacksonville Jaguars, and Buffalo Bills. He played college football for the UCLA Bruins. He also played professionally in NFL Europe and the United Football League (UFL).

== Early life ==
Neufeld attended Live Oak High School in Morgan Hill, California. As a junior, he received All-league and lineman of the year honors.

As a senior wide receiver, he registered 17 receptions for 633 yards, 7 touchdowns and received All-league honors. He finished his high school career with 45 receptions for 1,122 yards (24.9-yard average).

He also practiced track and basketball.

== College career ==
Neufeld accepted a football scholarship from the University of California, Los Angeles, where he was redshirted and converted into a linebacker. As a freshman backup outside linebacker, he had 23 tackles and two sacks for the Bruins. The next season, he made 16 tackles and missed three games with an ankle injury. He had eight tackles against Michigan.

As a junior, he was moved to tight end behind Mike Grieb. He tallied four receptions for 60 yards, one touchdown and was the starter at long snapper. As a senior, he posted 14 receptions (tied for fifth on the team), 141 yards and one touchdown. He finished his college career with 18 receptions for 201 yards, 2 touchdowns, 39 tackles and 2 sacks.

== Professional career ==
=== Dallas Cowboys ===
Neufeld was signed as an undrafted free agent by the Dallas Cowboys after the 1999 NFL draft on April 30, with the intention of converting him into a fullback. He was waived on September 5 and signed to the practice squad on September 7. On October 27, he was promoted to the active roster to be used on special teams and as a backup fullback. In 6 games, he registered 6 special teams tackles. He was deactivated in 2 games with a right ankle injury. He had one kickoff return for 9 yards in the playoffs against the Minnesota Vikings.

In 2000, he was allocated to the Rhein Fire of the NFL Europe. He played as a tight end, making 8 receptions for 75 yards, one touchdown and contributing to the team winning World Bowl VIII. He was released on August 27.

=== Miami Dolphins ===
On August 30, 2000, he was signed by the Miami Dolphins' practice squad. He was cut one week later on September 5.

=== Jacksonville Jaguars ===
On September 12, 2000, he was signed by the Jacksonville Jaguars to the practice squad as a tight end. He was promoted to the roster on October 12. He was released on October 21 to make room for cornerback Shad Criss. He was re-signed on October 24. He appeared in 3 games, was declared inactive in 4 and dressed but did not play in 2 contests. He was a backup tight end and made one special teams tackle.

In 2001, he suffered through eye, finger and calf injuries that limited his playing time during training camp and was released on August 26.

=== Seattle Seahawks ===
In 2002, he was signed as a free agent by the Seattle Seahawks, but was cut before the start of the season, when the team decided to keep the 2 tight ends they drafted that year.

=== Buffalo Bills ===
In 2003, Neufeld was signed by the Buffalo Bills to be used as a backup fullback and tight end. His best statistical season came in 2004 as a backup tight end, when he registered 6 receptions for 61 yards.

On December 22, 2005, he was placed on the injured reserve list with a knee injury. On November 12, 2006, he suffered a serious tendon injury in his foot and was again placed on the injured reserve list on November 16. In 2007, he was declared inactive in 7 of the last 10 games. He wasn't re-signed at the end of the season.

=== Florida Tuskers ===
Neufeld was signed by the Florida Tuskers of the United Football League on September 8, 2009. He missed several games after being injured and finished with 2 receptions for 6 yards and one touchdown.

=== Omaha Nighthawks ===
In 2010, he was selected by the Omaha Nighthawks in the United Football League expansion draft. He suffered a torn PCL during training camp and was lost for the season.

== Personal life ==
Neufeld is active in the Garth Brooks’ foundation Teammates for Kids and is the current director of football operations for the Miracle League of Frisco. He was formerly married to Dawn Neufeld, with whom he shares two children together.
