= Chris Akins =

American football player (born 1976)

No. 29, 31, 36, 34
- Position: Safety

Personal information
- Born: November 29, 1976 (age 49); Little Rock, Arkansas, U.S.
- Listed height: 5 ft 11 in (1.80 m)
- Listed weight: 200 lb (91 kg)

Career information
- High school: Hall (Little Rock)
- College: Arkansas-Pine Bluff
- NFL draft: 1999: 7th round, 212th overall pick

Career history
- Green Bay Packers (1999)*; Dallas Cowboys (1999–2000); → Rhein Fire (2000); Green Bay Packers (2000–2001); Cleveland Browns (2001–2002); New England Patriots (2003); Miami Dolphins (2004)
- * Offseason or practice squad member only

Awards and highlights
- Super Bowl champion (XXXVIII); Second-team Division I-AA All-American (1998); Black College All-American (1998); 2× All-SWAC (1997, 1998)

Career NFL statistics
- Games played: 61
- Stats at Pro Football Reference

Christopher Drew Akins (born November 29, 1976) is an American former professional football player who was a safety in the National Football League (NFL) for the Dallas Cowboys, Green Bay Packers, Cleveland Browns, New England Patriots, and Miami Dolphins. He played college football for the Arkansas–Pine Bluff Golden Lions.

== Early life ==
Akins attended Hall High School, where he lettered in football and Track and field athletics track. As a senior, he received Arkansas player of the year, All-Conference, All-State, and All-American honors, after recording 117 total tackles (85 solo), 17 passes defensed and 4 interceptions.

In Track and field athletics track, he was a two-time All-State selection and set school records in the 100 meters (10.33 seconds) and the 200 meters.he also has a few siblings Lorenzo Akins Terri Akins, and some grandchildren like Kylan Akins and Lorenzo Akins and Jalyn Akins.

== College career ==
Akins accepted a football scholarship from the University of Arkansas. As a sophomore, he started 6 games at free safety. He decided to transfer after two years to the University of Arkansas at Pine Bluff.

As a junior, because of the one-time transfer rule, he was allowed to play immediately, posting 52 tackles, 11 passes defensed and 6 interceptions. As a senior, he posted 66 tackles (4 for loss), 12 passes defensed, 3 fumble recoveries and 5 interceptions, including 2 returned for touchdowns. He had a 100-yard interception return for a touchdown in the fourth quarter of the 27–18 win against Alcorn State University. He received All-Southwestern Athletic Conference, second-team Division I-AA All-American and Black College All-American honors.

He finished his college career with 156 tackles (83 solo), 25 passed defensed, 12 interceptions and 6 fumble recoveries. In his two years at Arkansas-Pine-Bluff, he tallied 118 tackles, 23 passes defensed, 11 interceptions, 5 fumble recoveries and 9 tackles for loss.

== Professional career ==
=== Green Bay Packers (first stint) ===
Akins was selected by the Green Bay Packers in the seventh round (212th overall) of the 1999 NFL draft. He was cut at the end of training camp and signed to the team's practice squad on September 14.

=== Dallas Cowboys ===
On October 27, 1999, he was signed by the Dallas Cowboys from the Green Bay Packers practice squad. Although he only played in nine games, he finished with 15 special teams tackles (second on the team).

In 2000, he was allocated to the Rhein Fire of NFL Europe, where he helped his team win World Bowl VIII, while registering 47 tackles (fifth on the team), one interception, 7 special teams tackles (second on the team) and a blocked field goal. He made the Cowboys regular season roster but was released on October 31.

=== Green Bay Packers (second stint) ===
The Green Bay Packers claimed him off waivers on November 1, 2000. During the 2001 season, Akins angered head coach Mike Sherman with mental lapses on the field and his attitude off of it. He was cut on December 6, at the time he was tied for third on the team in special teams tackles (7).

=== Cleveland Browns ===
On October 12, 2001, he was claimed off waivers by the Cleveland Browns. The next year, he ranked second on the team with 25 special teams tackles while playing in 15 games.

=== New England Patriots ===
Akins signed with the New England Patriots as a free agent on March 12, 2003. He continued his career as a special teams player, contributing to the team's win in Super Bowl XXXVIII.

=== Miami Dolphins ===
On March 5, 2004, he signed with the Miami Dolphins as an unrestricted free agent. He spent the season on the team's injured reserve after tearing the medial collateral and anterior cruciate ligaments in his right knee, during a workout against the Houston Texans. He was released on September 5, 2005.
