= Alonzo Johnson (wide receiver) =

American football player (born 1973)

No. 19, 5, 1
- Positions: Wide receiver, Return specialist

Personal information
- Born: April 18, 1973 (age 53); Tuscaloosa, Alabama, U.S.
- Listed height: 5 ft 11 in (1.80 m)
- Listed weight: 183 lb (83 kg)

Career information
- High school: Mattie T. Blount (Eight Mile, Alabama)
- College: Central State (1992–1996)
- NFL draft: 1997: undrafted

Career history
- New York Jets (1997–1998)*; New Orleans Saints (1998–1999); → Barcelona Dragons (1999); Rhein Fire (2000); Detroit Lions (2000)*
- * Offseason or practice squad member only

Awards and highlights
- World Bowl champion (2000); 2× NAIA Division I national champion (1992, 1995); Black college national champion (1992)

Career NFL statistics
- Games played: 1
- Stats at Pro Football Reference

Alonzo Johnson (born April 18, 1973) is an American former professional football player who was a wide receiver and return specialist for the New Orleans Saints of the National Football League (NFL). He played college football for the Central State Marauders.

== Early life ==
Johnson was born on April 18, 1973, in Tuscaloosa, Alabama. He attended Mattie T. Blount High School in Eight Mile, Alabama. As a junior, Johnson had almost 600 receiving yards with ten touchdowns and the next year, he scored 15 times.

== College career ==
Johnson played college football for the Central State Marauders from 1992 to 1996. As a senior, he caught 46 passes for 913 yards and 11 touchdowns. Johnson also played in the 1996 Blue–Gray Football Classic.

== Professional career ==
=== New York Jets ===
After going unselected in the 1997 NFL draft, Johnson signed with the New York Jets as an undrafted free agent. On August 24, 1997, he was waived and signed to the practice squad. On December 23, Johnson was re-signed by the Jets. On August 22, 1998, he was waived.

=== New Orleans Saints ===
On August 25, 1998, Johnson was claimed off waivers by the New Orleans Saints. On August 30, he was released and signed to the practice squad. On December 19, Johnson was elevated to the active roster. He played in one game against the Buffalo Bills and was targeted twice but did not catch a pass. On August 30, 1999, Johnson was released by the Saints.

=== Barcelona Dragons ===
On February 22, 1999, Johnson was allocated to the Barcelona Dragons of NFL Europe. In nine games, he had three touchdowns and 84 return yards.

=== Rhein Fire ===
In 2000, Johnson signed with the Rhein Fire of NFL Europe. He logged 41 receptions for 538 yards and three touchdowns with 505 return yards in ten games, winning the World Bowl.

=== Detroit Lions ===
On July 13, 2000, Johnson was signed by the Detroit Lions. On August 27, he was waived by the team.
