= Justin Swift =

American football player (born 1975)

No. 89, 88
- Position: Tight end

Personal information
- Born: August 14, 1975 (age 51); Kansas City, Kansas, U.S.
- Listed height: 6 ft 3 in (1.91 m)
- Listed weight: 265 lb (120 kg)

Career information
- High school: Blue Valley (Stilwell, Kansas)
- College: Kansas State (1994–1998)
- NFL draft: 1999: 7th round, 238th overall pick

Career history
- Denver Broncos (1999)*; Philadelphia Eagles (1999); Denver Broncos (1999)*; San Francisco 49ers (1999–2002); → Frankfurt Galaxy (2000); Houston Texans (2003)*; Atlanta Falcons (2004)*; Detroit Lions (2005)*
- * Offseason or practice squad member only
- Stats at Pro Football Reference

Justin Charles Swift (born August 14, 1975) is an American former professional football tight end who played four seasons in the National Football League (NFL) with the San Francisco 49ers and Philadelphia Eagles. He was selected by the Denver Broncos in the seventh round of the 1999 NFL draft after playing college football at Kansas State University. Swift also played for the Frankfurt Galaxy of NFL Europe.

== Early life and college ==
Justin Charles Swift was born on August 14, 1975, in Kansas City, Kansas. He attended Blue Valley High School in Stilwell, Kansas.

Swift played college football for the Kansas State Wildcats of Kansas State University. He was redshirted in 1994 and was a four-year letterman from 1995 to 1998. He caught one pass for 25 yards in 1995, five passes for 63 yards in 1996, 13 passes for 267 yards and three touchdowns in 1997, and 23 passes for 342 yards and three touchdowns in 1998.

== Professional career ==
Swift was selected by the Denver Broncos in the seventh round, with the 238th overall pick, of the 1999 NFL draft. He officially signed with the team on July 20. He was released on August 27, 1999.

Swift signed with the Philadelphia Eagles on September 14, 1999, and played in one game for the team before being released on September 28, 1999.

He was signed to the Broncos' practice squad on October 19, 1999, and was released on November 2, 1999.

Swift was signed to the San Francisco 49ers' practice squad on November 15, 1999. He became a free agent after the season and re-signed with the 49ers. He was allocated to NFL Europe in 2000 to play for the Frankfurt Galaxy. He played in all ten games for the Galaxy during the 2000 NFL Europe season, catching 27 passes for 260 yards and two touchdowns. He appeared in all 16 games, starting one, for the 49ers during the 2000 NFL season, catching one pass for eight yards on three targets. Swift played in all 16 games for the second consecutive season, starting two, in 2001, recording 11 receptions for 66 yards and one touchdown on 11 targets. He also made two solo tackles. He appeared in one playoff game that year as well. Swift became a free agent after the 2001 season and re-signed with the 49ers on March 17, 2002. He played in all 16 games for the third straight year, starting four, in 2002, totaling 10 receptions for 63 yards on 15 targets, and one solo tackle. He also played in two playoff games that year and became a free agent after the season.

Swift signed with the Houston Texans on June 2, 2003. He was released on August 31, 2003.

He was signed by the Atlanta Falcons on June 30, 2004, but was later released on September 6, 2004.

Swift signed with the Detroit Lions on August 9, 2005, and was released shortly afterward on August 30, 2005.
