= Dick Hopkins =

American football coach (born 1951)

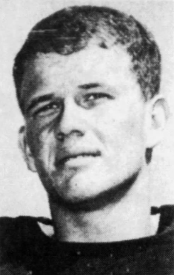
- Hopkins in 1971

Biographical details
- Born: October 9, 1951 (age 75); Toledo, Ohio, U.S.
- Education: Florida State University (1974, 1975)

Playing career
- 1970–1972: Florida State
- Positions: Tight end, quarterback

Coaching career (HC unless noted)
- 1973: Florida State (SA)
- 1975: Forest Hill HS (FL) (OC)
- 1976–1977: Twin Lakes HS (FL)
- 1978–1980: Florida State (GA)
- 1981 (spring): Duke (DB)
- 1981–1982: Duke (DC/DB)
- 1983: Cincinnati (DC/DB)
- 1984–1985: Rice (DC/DB)
- 1986–1988: Vanderbilt (DC/DB)
- 1989–1992: Temple (DB)
- 1993: Yale (DC/DB)
- 1994–1996: Tulane (DB)
- 1997–1998: Tulane (DE)
- 1999–2003: James Madison (DC/DB)
- 2004–2005: The Citadel (DC/CB)
- 2006–2007: Rhode Island (DC)
- 2008: Chattanooga (DC/DB)
- 2009: Duquesne (DC/DB)
- 2010–2011: Florida Atlantic (DB)
- 2012–2013: Santaluces HS (FL) (assistant)
- 2014: Olympic Heights HS (FL) (DC)
- 2016–2017: Emory and Henry (DC/DB)

Head coaching record
- Overall: 9–11

Richard Hopkins (born October 9, 1951) is an American former college football coach. He was the defensive coordinator for Duke, Cincinnati, Rice, Vanderbilt, Yale, James Madison, The Citadel, Rhode Island, Chattanooga, Duquesne, and Emory and Henry. He also coached for Florida State, Forest Hill High School, Twin Lakes High School, Temple, Tulane, Florida Atlantic, Santaluces Community High School, and Olympic Heights Community High School. He played college football for Florida State as a quarterback and tight end.

== Playing career ==
Hopkins was born on October 9, 1951, in Toledo, Ohio. He grew up in Cincinnati and West Palm Beach, Florida, and attended Forest Hill High School. At Forest Hill, he played football with future NFL player Ken Stone.

In 1970, Hopkins enrolled at Florida State and played college football as a quarterback. He was originally going to commit to Duke after visiting with Tom Harp in 1969, but ultimately chose Florida State. In his initial season, he served as the fourth/fifth string quarterback with minimal practice time with first-year head coach Larry Jones stating: "He really hasn't had that much work. We won't know until the fall whether we'll red-shirt him or not." In 1972, Hopkins transitioned from quarterback to tight end, serving as the second stringer after being the starting tight end during spring scrimmages due to an injury to incumbent starter Gary Parris. He missed two games due to injury. In Hopkins' third year with Florida State, he was again sidelined with an injury, this time a shoulder injury which required season-ending surgery that led him to quit the team entirely.

While at Florida State University, Hopkins lived with teammate Mack Brown. Hopkins earned his Bachelor of Physical Education and Master's of Mass Communication from Florida State University in 1974 and 1975, respectively.

== Coaching career ==
After Hopkins quit the Seminoles' football team, he immediately joined the coaching staff, serving as a student assistant, specifically with the freshmen team.

Hopkins was out of coaching in 1974, but in 1975, he returned to the sideline as the offensive coordinator for his alma mater, Forest Hill.

After one season, Hopkins was hired as the head coach for Twin Lakes High School, a team that finished the previous season with a 4–6 records. He took over at 24 years old with less than three weeks before the season-opener. As head coach, he ran a veer offense. Hopkins ended his inaugural season with three wins, one from a forfeit when Lake Worth Community High School were forced to forfeit their win due to an ineligible player, and the final on Forest Hill's homecoming on the second-to-last game of the season. In Hopkins' second season, he immediately improved on the previous season's mark, leading the team to a 3–1 record in the first four weeks and tied for first in the Suncoast Conference's East Division. Included in those three wins was a 13–6 win over 1976 Suncoast champion Palm Beach Gardens Community High School. Twin Lakes finished the season with an overall record of 6–4, their first winning season ever, leading to Hopkins winning the Suncoast East Division Coach of the Year honors, beating out Otis Grey, who led his Boca Raton Community High School team to a 10–1 record and a playoff appearance.

In August 1978, Hopkins left Twin Lakes in the same position it had been left to him in, without a head coach, less than a month before the season opener, when he abruptly resigned to become a graduate assistant for Bobby Bowden at his alma mater, Florida State. Palm Beach County superintendent Tom Mills urged the Twin Lakes School Board to not accept Hopkins' resignation as he violated his contract with the school, which stated that he must give his notice of resignation by June 15, whereas Hopkins submitted his resignation on August 13, a week before practices were set to begin. Mills stated that he believed "that he violated the contract for his own personal advantage, and students have been hurt because of this." Alongside not accepting Hopkins' resignation, Mills suggested that the board should seek revocation of Hopkins' teaching certificate for one year. Hopkins spent his first season assisting the defensive line and defensive ends before transitioning to working with Jack Stanton and the defensive backs for the next two years. During his last two seasons with the team, Florida State finished with back-to-back ten-plus win seasons with two Tangerine Bowl appearances against Oklahoma. With Florida State, Hopkins openly discussed his dislike for recruiting practices in the NCAA, calling the actions of recruiters "blatant cheating," as coaches would make false promises to athletes regularly.

By 1981, Hopkins had spent three seasons under Bowden in a part-time position before being hired as the defensive backs coach for Duke under Shirley Wilson. Hopkins took over for defensive coordinator Cliff Yoshida who resigned to coach for Virginia Tech. Wilson stated that a successor to Yoshida would not be named until after spring training, with Hopkins eventually earning the promotion despite having just joined the coaching staff. He inherited a defense that allowed 560 points in the past two seasons including 296 in the 2–9 1980 campaign. In his first season with the team, he helped improve the team to a 6–5 record, and coached two All-ACC players Dennis Tabron and Charles Bowser. Despite the overall team improvement, the Blue Devils' defense still struggled, with midway through the 1982 season the defense gave up over 400 yard per game. After a second-consecutive 6–5 season, with the defense again struggling, Wilson, Hopkins, and much of the staff was fired.

Following Hopkins' firing from Duke, he accepted the same positions for Cincinnati under first-year head coach Watson Brown, brother of Hopkins' college roommate Mack. Hopkins chose the Cincinnati job over an offer from East Carolina and after recent talks with Wake Forest.

After one season, Watson and Hopkins moved to Rice in their same respective positions. The team went 1–10 and allowed 432 yards per game in his first season.

Rice went 3–8 in 1985, and Hopkins once again followed Watson, this time to Vanderbilt. Hopkins first course of action with Vanderbilt was to transition the team from its 4–3 defense to an eight-in-the-box defense, a move he had previously installed with Rice midway through the season. He stated the switch was "a simple matter of adopting a defensive to fit the talent." After a 1–10 season where the defense gave up 31.5 points per game and 409.9 yards per game, Hopkins made another switch on defense, this time changing to a 5–3 defense. Despite the change, the defense was again at the bottom of the Southeastern Conference (SEC) as the team went 4–7. For the third-consecutive year, the team switched defensive formations, this time to a 4–3 defense, virtually identical to the Nick Saban-led defense of Michigan State. The team finished with a 3–8 record.

After six seasons alongside Watson, one with Cincinnati, two with Rice, and three with Vanderbilt, Hopkins left to become the defensive backs coach for Temple.

Hopkins spent four seasons with Temple before becoming the defensive coordinator and defensive backs coach for Yale, replacing Don Brown, who left to become the head coach for Plymouth State. Carmen Cozza praised Hopkins, stating: "We are very fortunate to have Dick with us...His extensive experience as a defensive secondary coach and coordinator make him a fine addition to our staff." Hopkins switched the Yale defense from a 4–3 to a 5–2 defense. He spent one season with Yale, departing after a 3–7 record.

Hopkins joined the staff of former Dartmouth head coach Buddy Teevens, who was now the head coach for Tulane. Hopkins was hired as the defensive backs coach. He was retained for the 1997 season after the departure of Teevens and the hiring of Tommy Bowden, the son of Hopkins' former head coach from Florida State, Bobby Bowden. Alongside his retention, he transitioned to defensive ends coach.

Before Tulane's bowl game in 1998, Bowden left and Chris Scelfo was brought in as his replacement. After the team won, Scelfo began shaping his staff, which included not retaining Hopkins. Following the termination of his Tulane contract, he was hired on the initial staff of Mickey Matthews at James Madison as the defensive coordinator and defensive backs coach. Matthews served in Hopkins place for the game against Villanova due to Hopkins being hospitalized for a blood clot. After a successful 8–4 initial season, which included a playoff appearance, the team then went 6–5 in 2000, 2–9 in 2001, 5–7 in 2002, and 6–6 in 2006, which led to Hopkins' resignation from the team. During his tenure, he coached all-conference players Ron Atkins and Mark Coates.

Shortly after Hopkins' resignation from James Madison, he was hired in the same positions at The Citadel by former James Madison offensive coordinator, now The Citadel head coach, John Zernhelt. Zernhelt spoke of Hopkins and the hiring "His love for the game of football and his players were some of the major factors in The Citadel bringing him in." Unlike with previous teams, Hopkins opted to retain the team's previous defensive scheme of a 4–3. Hopkins was retained after Zernhelt left after the 2004 season, but he was let go after the 2005 season, his first alongside Kevin Higgins. During his stint with The Citadel, Hopkins coached all-conference players Avery Dingle and Shawn Grant.

In 2006, Hopkins was hired as the defensive coordinator for Rhode Island. In his initial season, he helped lead the defense to an A-10 second-best passing yards allowed per game, with just under 160 yards per game.

After two seasons with Rhode Island, he opted to leave and become the defensive coordinator and defensive backs coach for Chattanooga under Rodney Allison, becoming the third defensive coordinator the team had in the previous three weeks. Hopkins was hired after David Bibee, who was promoted after Billy Taylor left, also left.

Hopkins spent one season with Chattanooga before also spending one season at Duquesne.

In 2010, Hopkins was hired as the defensive backs coach for Florida Atlantic, his first Division I FBS position since Tulane in 1998. Upon accepting the position, he stated: "I'm excited about returning to Florida and especially to the area I called home as a youngster...Thank you to Coach Schnellenberger for giving me the opportunity to be a part of his plan as he continues to build the FAU football program."

Hopkins left in 2012, after Schnellenberger's retirement and served as an assistant coach at Santaluces Community High School.

In 2014, Hopkins was hired as the defensive coordinator for Olympic Heights Community High School.

After not coaching in 2015, Hopkins returned as the defensive coordinator and defensive backs coach for Emory and Henry under Curt Newsome. The pair had previously worked together at James Madison in the early 2000s.

== Personal life ==
Hopkins was college roommates with Tulane, North Carolina, and Texas head coach Mack Brown while at Florida State University. Hopkins was also longtime friends with Brown's older brother, Watson, who Hopkins worked alongside from 1983 to 1988 at Cincinnati, Rice, and Vanderbilt.

In October 1999, Hopkins was hospitalized at Rockingham County, Virginia, due to a blood clot in his leg.

== Head coaching record ==
Year	Team	Overall	Conference	Standing	Bowl/playoffs
Twin Lakes Rams (Suncoast Conference) (1976–1977)
1976	Twin Lakes	3–7		(East)	
1977	Twin Lakes	6–4		(East)	
Twin Lakes:		9–11			
Total:		9–11			
