= Brian Saxton =

American football player (born 1972)

No. 48, 83, 49
- Position: Tight end

Personal information
- Born: March 13, 1972 (age 54); Whippany, New Jersey, U.S.
- Listed height: 6 ft 6 in (1.98 m)
- Listed weight: 256 lb (116 kg)

Career information
- High school: Whippany Park
- College: Boston College
- NFL draft: 1995: undrafted

Career history
- New York Giants (1995–1996); Atlanta Falcons (1997); (1998-2000)*; Frankfurt Galaxy (2000)
- * Offseason or practice squad member only
- Stats at Pro Football Reference

Paul Brian Saxton (born March 13, 1972) is an American former professional football player who was a tight end and H-back for the New York Giants and Atlanta Falcons of the National Football League (NFL). He played college football for the Boston College Eagles.

== Early life ==
Saxton was born in Atlantic City, New Jersey. He was raised in Whippany, New Jersey and is a graduate of Whippany Park High School, where he played for and was the captain of the Wildcats high school football, basketball and baseball teams.

== College Career ==
Saxton accepted an athletic scholarship to attend Boston College, where he played football for the Eagles from 1990 through 1994. During his college career, he played under several head coaches, including Tom Coughlin and Dan Henning.

Saxton was recruited to Boston College by Jack Bicknell, who was the school's head football coach at the time of his recruitment. Coughlin subsequently became head coach, serving from 1991 through 1993, while Henning coached the Eagles during Saxton's fifth year.

Among Saxton's notable performances was his play against Louisville in 1994, during which he earned recognition on ESPN's Plays of the Week. He also played in Boston College's nationally notable matchup against Notre Dame, in which No. 17 Boston College defeated the No. 1-ranked Fighting Irish 41–39. Saxton also played in the 1993 Hall of Fame Bowl, 1994 Carquest Bowl, and 1994 Aloha Bowl.

In addition to football, Saxton was recruited to play baseball at Boston College. He joined the Boston College baseball team and pitched during his fifth year season (1995), under head coach Richard "Moe" Maloney. During his time as a pitcher, Saxton made multiple appearances on the mound, including one in the long-standing exhibition game tradition against the Boston Red Sox, where he pitched against star shortstop Nomar Garciaparra.

== Professional career ==
=== New York Giants ===
Following his college career, Saxton signed with the New York Giants of the National Football League. He joined the organization during the tenure of head coach Dan Reeves.

=== Atlanta Falcons ===
Reeves brought Saxton to Atlanta after leaving New York to take over as the Falcons' head coach.

== Post-playing career ==
In 2000, Saxton worked on the football film The Replacements, starring Keanu Reeves, Gene Hackman, Jon Favreau, and David Denman. Saxton served as a stunt double for David Denman, who portrayed Brian Murphy in the film. Through his work on The Replacements, Saxton became a member of the Screen Actors Guild (SAG), which later became part of SAG-AFTRA.

Saxton worked on the television series Friday Night Lights. This included work as a background performer and stunt coordinator. He appeared in the series finale, "Always".

Following his work in entertainment, Saxton transitioned into the financial services industry. He is currently the chief executive officer of a registered investment advisory firm in Northern New Jersey, that concentrates on private wealth and institutional investment management, along with many other financial services.
