= Nate Riles =

Profile
- Position: Defensive back

Career information
- High school: Akron (OH) Archbishop Hoban
- College: Ohio Northern
- NFL draft: 1999: undrafted

Career history
- Arizona Cardinals (1999)*; Frankfurt Galaxy (2000)*; Winnipeg Blue Bombers (2001)
- * Offseason or practice squad member only

Awards and highlights
- First Team OAC (1998)

Nate Riles is a retired professional gridiron football player that played in the Canadian Football League.

== Early life ==
Riles attended Archbishop Hoban High School where he won multiple OHSAA track and field titles. This includes a team state title.

== College career ==
Riles played at Ohio Northern University where he was first team all-OAC. He also played in the 1998 Aztec Bowl all-star game.

== Professional career ==
Riles signed with the Arizona Cardinals for the 1999 season, but was cut during training camp.

He spent part of the 2000 season with the Frankfurt Galaxy, but was ultimately cut.

He spent the later part of the 2001 season with the Winnipeg Blue Bombers as an injury replacement after having been previously cut earlier that season. He had a game-saving interception to secure the division title for the Blue Bombers during that season.
