= 2000 Amsterdam Admirals season =

NFL Europe team season

- General manager: Ronald Buys
- Head coach: Al Luginbill
- Home stadium: Amsterdam ArenA; Olympisch Stadion

Results
- Record: 4–6
- Division place: 4th
- Playoffs: Did not qualify

The 2000 Amsterdam Admirals season was the sixth season for the franchise in the NFL Europe League (NFLEL). The team was led by head coach Al Luginbill in his sixth year, and played its home games at Amsterdam ArenA and Olympisch Stadion in Amsterdam, Netherlands. They finished the regular season in fourth place with a record of four wins and six losses.

== Offseason ==
=== Free agent draft ===
2000 Amsterdam Admirals NFLEL free agent draft selections
Round	Player name	Position	College
1	Wasswa Serwanga	CB	UCLA
2	Gregory Studdard	T	Sam Houston State
3	Rob Lurtsema	DT	Wisconsin
4	Deon Humphrey	LB	Florida State
5	Derrick LeVake	T	Wisconsin–Whitewater
6	Damon Washington	RB	Colorado State
7	Tony Gaiter	WR	Miami (FL)
8	Mike Grieb	TE	UCLA
9	Dan Falcon	DT	Western Michigan
10	Marcel Willis	LB	Ohio State
11	Pat Downey	C	New Hampshire
12	Scott Von Der Ahe	LB	Arizona State
13	Taj Johnson	WR	San Diego State
14	Jim Murphy	QB	Northeastern
15	Michael Lies	G	Kansas
16	Bobby Singh	G	Portland State
17	Junior Lord	WR	Guilford
18	Mark Kacmarynski	RB	Central Iowa
19	John Lumpkin	TE	Ohio State
20	Joe Douglass	WR	Montana
21	Brian Lytle	DE	Humboldt State
22	Jerry Ross	TE	Pittsburg State
23	Octavious Bishop	T	Texas

== Personnel ==
=== Staff ===
2000 Amsterdam Admirals staff
Front office: General manager – Ronald Buys; Head coaches: Head coach – Al Luginbill; Offensive coaches: Offensive coordinator/quarterbacks – Chris L. Allen; Running backs/tight ends – Dave Levy; Offensive line – Al Tanara; National coach/offensive Assistant – Robert von Gerhardt	Defensive coaches: Defensive coordinator/linebackers – Jim Hilles; Defensive line – Darryl Sims; Defensive backs – Al Luginbill; Special teams coaches: Special teams – Al Tanara; Strength and conditioning: Strength and conditioning – John Fassel

=== Roster ===
2000 Amsterdam Admirals final roster
Quarterbacks: 11 Jim Kubiak; 12 Scott Mutryn; 10 Ron Powlus; Running backs: 22 Ralph Dawkins; 26 Juan Johnson; 28 Mark Kacmarynski; Wide receivers: 8 Darryl Daniel; 1 Tony Gaiter; 82 Junior Lord; 2 Jason Shelley; 18 L. C. Stevens; Tight ends: 46 Frank Leatherwood; 86 Jerry Ross	Offensive linemen: 69 Rick Austin G; 72 Octavious Bishop T; 74 Derrick LeVake T (IR); 62 Michael Lies G; 77 Oliver Ross T; 66 Tom Schau C; 65 Earl Scott G/C; 66 Greg Studdard T; 60 Ryan Thomassie C; 67 Paul Wiggins T/G; Defensive linemen: 93 Tim Beauchamp DE; 99 Patrick Bradford DT; 99 Harry Deligianis DT; 71 Frank Ferrara DE; 90 Cedric Harden DE; 95 Jon Kirksey D; 94 Tony Plantin DT; 92 David Sanders DT; 98 Pene Talamaivao DT	Linebackers: 56 O. J. Childress MLB; 52 Deon Humphrey OLB; 51 Derik Stevenson OLB; 55 Shawn Stuckey OLB; 54 Marcel Willis OLB; Defensive backs: 40 Rico Clark CB; 29 Eric Edwards SS; 25 Ray Jackson CB; 23 Steve Johnson CB; 24 Bashir Levingston CB; 36 Greg Williams FS; Special teams: 5 José Cortez K	National players: 9 (Italy) Francesco Biancamano P; 14 (Netherlands) Silvio Diliberto K; 87 (Japan) Masato Itai WR; 57 (Japan) Masafumi Kawaguchi MLB; 83 (Netherlands) Niels Meijer WR; 70 (Poland) Marek Rubin T; 35 (Japan) Kohei Satomi FS/SS; 33 (Netherlands) Frank Temming RB (IR); Rookies in italics

== Schedule ==
Week	Date	Kickoff (Note: All times local to where the game was played.)	Opponent	Results		Game site	Attendance
Week	Date	Kickoff	Opponent	Final score	Team record	Game site	Attendance
1	Sunday, April 16	3:00 p.m.	at Scottish Claymores	L 9–28	0–1	Murrayfield Stadium	8,726
2	Saturday, April 22	7:00 p.m.	Rhein Fire	W 23–20 ^{OT}	1–1	Amsterdam ArenA	13,285
3	Sunday, April 30	7:00 p.m.	Barcelona Dragons	L 20–27	1–2	Amsterdam ArenA	9,042
4	Saturday, May 6	7:00 p.m.	at Frankfurt Galaxy	W 20–17	2–2	Waldstadion	31,112
5	Saturday, May 13	7:00 p.m.	Berlin Thunder	W 24–21 ^{OT}	3–2	Amsterdam ArenA	10,320
6	Saturday, May 20	7:00 p.m.	at Barcelona Dragons	L 16–22	3–3	Estadi Olímpic de Montjuïc	8,100
7	Sunday, May 28	7:00 p.m.	Frankfurt Galaxy	W 41–7	4–3	Amsterdam ArenA	12,048
8	Saturday, June 3	7:00 p.m.	Scottish Claymores	L 10–42	4–4	Olympisch Stadion	10,867
9	Saturday, June 10	7:00 p.m.	at Berlin Thunder	L 15–28	4–5	Jahn-Sportpark	8,014
10	Sunday, June 18	7:00 p.m.	at Rhein Fire	L 28–31	4–6	Rheinstadion	37,113

== Standings ==
NFL Europe League
Team	W	L	T	PCT	PF	PA	Home	Road	STK
Rhein Fire	7	3	0	.700	279	209	5–0	2–3	W1
Scottish Claymores	6	4	0	.600	273	165	4–1	2–3	L1
Barcelona Dragons	5	5	0	.500	194	212	2–3	3–2	W1
Amsterdam Admirals	4	6	0	.400	206	243	3–2	1–4	L3
Frankfurt Galaxy	4	6	0	.400	206	269	1–4	3–2	W2
Berlin Thunder	4	6	0	.400	189	249	3–2	1–4	L1
