= Ernie Brown (gridiron football) =

American football player (born 1971)

No. 98
- Position: Defensive end

Personal information
- Born: March 14, 1971 (age 55); Pittsburgh, Pennsylvania, U.S.
- Listed height: 6 ft 3 in (1.91 m)
- Listed weight: 295 lb (134 kg)

Career information
- High school: North Catholic (Cranberry Township, Pennsylvania)
- College: Syracuse
- NFL draft: 1994: undrafted

Career history
- Detroit Lions (1994)*; Saskatchewan Roughriders (1995)*, (1996); Calgary Stampeders (1996–1997); Saskatchewan Roughriders (1998); Pittsburgh Steelers (1999–2000); → Rhein Fire (2000)
- * Offseason or practice squad member only

Awards and highlights
- Gator Bowl champion (1998); Liberty Bowl champion (1996)

Career NFL statistics
- Games played: 3
- Stats at Pro Football Reference

Ernest Davis Brown (born March 14, 1971) is an American former professional football player who was a defensive end for two seasons with the Pittsburgh Steelers of the National Football League (NFL). He played college football for the Syracuse Orange. He also played professionally in the Canadian Football League (CFL).
