= Rob Bohlinger =

American football player (born 1975)

No. 79
- Position: Offensive tackle

Personal information
- Born: June 14, 1975 (age 51); Minneapolis, Minnesota, U.S.
- Listed height: 6 ft 8 in (2.03 m)
- Listed weight: 310 lb (141 kg)

Career information
- High school: Totino-Grace (Fridley, Minnesota)
- College: Wyoming
- NFL draft: 1998: undrafted

Career history
- Carolina Panthers (1998); Frankfurt Galaxy (2000)

Career NFL statistics
- Games played: 13
- Games started: 1
- Fumble recoveries: 1
- Stats at Pro Football Reference

Robert Paul Bohlinger (born June 14, 1975) is an American former professional football player who was an offensive tackle for the Carolina Panthers of the National Football League (NFL) in 1998. He played college football for the Wyoming Cowboys.
