= 2000 Berlin Thunder season =

NFL Europe team season

- General manager: Michael Lang
- Head coach: Peter Vaas
- Home stadium: Jahn-Sportpark

Results
- Record: 4–6
- Division place: 6th
- Playoffs: did not qualify

The 2000 Berlin Thunder season was the second season for the franchise in the NFL Europe League (NFLEL). The team was led by head coach Peter Vaas in his first year, and played its home games at Jahn-Sportpark in Berlin, Germany. They finished the regular season in sixth place with a record of four wins and six losses.

== Offseason ==
=== Free agent draft ===
2000 Berlin Thunder NFLEL free agent draft selections
Draft order			Player name	Position	College
Round	Choice	Overall	Player name	Position	College
1	1	1	Jonathan Brown	DE	Tennessee
2	1	7	Jami Oats	CB	South Carolina State
3	6	18	Chris Jackson	WR	Washington State
4	1	19	Troy Saunders	CB	Florida State
5	6	30	Robert Scott	WR	Utah State
6	1	31	Marques Brigham	RB	Wyoming
7	6	42	Mike Cook	QB	William & Mary
8	1	43	Mesene Louisdor	CB	Central Michigan
9	5	53	Anthony Ladd	WR	Cincinnati
9	6	54	Mercedes Hamilton	G	Tennessee
10	1	55	Kenny Watts	G	Utah State
11	6	66	Brian McKenzie	RB	Brigham Young
12	1	67	Adam Young	TE	Dartmouth
13	6	78	Mike Sutton	DE	LSU
14	1	79	John George	WR	Southern
15	6	90	Billy Gustin	S	Purdue
16	1	91	Antwuan Wyatt	WR	Bethune-Cookman
17	6	102	Keith Williams	S	St. Cloud State
18	1	103	Travis Hardin	T	Kentucky State
19	6	114	Harry Deligianis	DT	Youngstown State
20	1	115	Pascal Volz	WR	New Mexico
21	6	126	Jermaine Derricott	S	South Carolina State

== Personnel ==
=== Staff ===
2000 Berlin Thunder staff
Front office: General manager – Michael Lang; Head coaches: Head coach/offensive coordinator – Peter Vaas; Offensive coaches: National coach/running backs – Shuan Fatah; Wide receivers – Bobby Beers; Offensive line – Bob Bicknell	Defensive coaches: Defensive coordinator/linebackers – Steve Carson; Defensive line – Mickey Mays; Defensive backs – Stephen Braggs; Strength and conditioning: Strength and conditioning – Ron McKeefery

=== Roster ===
2000 Berlin Thunder final roster
Quarterbacks: 8 Mike Cook; 15 Eric Kresser; 13 Scott Milanovich; Running backs: 33 Marques Brigham; 25 Vershan Jackson; 45 Brian Shay; Wide receivers: 82 Thabiti Davis; 81 Damon Dunn; 18 Anthony Ladd; 87 Robert Scott; Tight ends: 89 Jason Freeman; 5 Tywan Mitchell	Offensive linemen: 75 Tony Berti T; 65 Jon Blackman T; 70 Rome Douglas T; 67 Mike Edwards T; 76 Grant Garrett G; 74 Thomas Guynes G; 77 Travis Hardin T; 60 Brian Waters C; 68 Jon Zatechka G; Defensive linemen: 92 Jonathan Brown DE; 95 Terry Day DE; 90 Bill Duff DT; 91 T. J. Frier DT; 93 Henry Slay DT; 99 Mike Sutton DE; 98 Greg Wilkins DT	Linebackers: 56 Sedric Clark OLB; 55 Lamont Green OLB (IR); 54 Richard Hogans MLB; 51 Joe Phipps OLB; Defensive backs: 23 Duane Butler CB; 21 Donnie Caldwell S/CB; 24 Chris Cummings CB; 40 Billy Gustin S; 43 Zebbie Lethridge CB; 27 Kevin Peoples S; 26 Troy Saunders CB; Special teams: 10 Jaret Holmes K; 2 Brian Moorman P	National players: 20 (Germany) Lelan Brickus S; 58 (Germany) Christian Czwalinna OLB; 80 (Germany) Marico Gregersen WR; 84 (Germany) Jörg Heckenbach WR; 9 (Germany) Axel Kruse K; 36 (Germany) Kim Kuci RB; 53 (Germany) Rene Neunzig MLB; 35 (Germany) Richard Yancy S; Rookies in italics

== Schedule ==
Week	Date	Kickoff (Note: All times local to where the game was played.)	Opponent	Results		Game site	Attendance
Week	Date	Kickoff	Opponent	Final score	Team record	Game site	Attendance
1	Saturday, April 15	7:00 p.m.	Frankfurt Galaxy	L 7–32	0–1	Jahn-Sportpark	10,785
2	Monday, April 24	5:00 p.m.	at Barcelona Dragons	W 28–21	1–1	Estadi Olímpic de Montjuïc	7,500
3	Saturday, April 29	7:00 p.m.	Scottish Claymores	W 24–20	2–1	Jahn-Sportpark	7,913
4	Sunday, May 7	3:00 p.m.	at Scottish Claymores	L 3–42	2–2	Murrayfield Stadium	8,912
5	Saturday, May 13	7:00 p.m.	at Amsterdam Admirals	L 21–24 ^{OT}	2–3	Amsterdam ArenA	10,320
6	Sunday, May 21	3:00 p.m.	Rhein Fire	W 24-21 ^{OT}	3–3	Jahn-Sportpark	10,273
7	Saturday, May 27	7:00 p.m.	at Rhein Fire	L 27–28	3–4	Rheinstadion	33,437
8	Saturday, June 3	7:00 p.m.	Barcelona Dragons	L 9–22	3–5	Jahn-Sportpark	7,932
9	Saturday, June 10	7:00 p.m.	Amsterdam Admirals	W 28–15	4–5	Jahn-Sportpark	8,014
10	Saturday, June 17	6:00 p.m.	at Frankfurt Galaxy	L 17–24	4–6	Waldstadion	31,648

== Standings ==
NFL Europe League
Team	W	L	T	PCT	PF	PA	Home	Road	STK
Rhein Fire	7	3	0	.700	279	209	5–0	2–3	W1
Scottish Claymores	6	4	0	.600	273	165	4–1	2–3	L1
Barcelona Dragons	5	5	0	.500	194	212	2–3	3–2	W1
Amsterdam Admirals	4	6	0	.400	206	243	3–2	1–4	L3
Frankfurt Galaxy	4	6	0	.400	206	269	1–4	3–2	W2
Berlin Thunder	4	6	0	.400	189	249	3–2	1–4	L1
