= Olympic Heights Community High School =

Location
- 20101 Lyons Road; South Florida; Palm Beach County, Florida 33434; United States of America; 26.378544°N 80.186824°W

Information
- School type: Public, high school
- Established: 1991
- School district: Palm Beach County School District
- Authority: Kelly Burke
- School number: 2181
- Teaching staff: 128.00 (FTE)
- Grades: 9-12
- Enrollment: 2,602 (2022-2023)
- Student to teacher ratio: 20.33
- Colors: Black and Vegas gold
- Mascot: Lion
- Team name: Lions
- Rival: West Boca Raton Bulls, Spanish River Sharks
- Newspaper: The Torch
- Website: ohhs.palmbeachschools.org

Olympic Heights Community High School is a public high school located at 20101 Lyons Road, known for, serving west Boca Raton, parts of Boynton Beach and parts of Delray Beach as part of the School District of Palm Beach County, Florida.

== Academies ==
Olympic Heights offers a number of "academies," or specializations within the school itself. These academies are early childhood and teacher education, engineering and technology (Project Lead The Way), hospitality and tourism, and finance and resort management. There are also two in-house academies: culinary and fashion design.

Additionally, Olympic Heights offers a variety of Advanced Placement (AP) and AICE courses.

== Demographics ==
As of the 2014–2015 school year, the student population was 46.8% White, 31.2% Hispanic/Latino, 14% African-American, 4.5% Asian/Pacific Islander, 2.2% Multiracial, and 1.3% Native American.

41.1% of students were eligible for free or reduced lunch.

== Chinese ==
The school has a Chinese department. They have won the state championship twice in a row, being the first public school to win, and beating over twenty private schools from all over Florida.

== Dance ==
The Olympic Heights hip-hop dance team was awarded first place and an elite gold medal at the StarPowder dance competition in 2004.

== Journalism ==
The Torch is a newspaper run by the students of OHHS.

In 2014, a daily updated news site was created by the students of OHHS. The site is ohtorch.com

== Model United Nations ==
The Model United Nations Club at Olympic Heights has enjoyed success at regional conferences over the last few years.

- 2009-2010 - Won the "Best Small School" Award at the GatorMUN Conference at the University of Florida (UF).
- 2010-2012 - Won many individual awards at the GatorMUN Conference at UF.
- 2012 - Four delegates received a total of 7 awards at the FIMUN Conference at Florida International University.

== Notable alumni ==
- Alli Webb - Founder of DryBar
- Pat Curran (fighter) - wrestler; professional Mixed Martial Artist in the Bellator MMA Featherweight Division
- Central McClellion - professional football player, Kansas City Chiefs
- Megan Hauserman - reality TV star - Beauty and the Geek 3, Rock of Love 2, and Megan Wants a Millionaire
- Ryland Blackinton - member of Cobra Starship
- Alex Suarez - member of Cobra Starship
- Jevon Tarantino - member of the 2008 Olympic diving team in Beijing, China. 2004 NCAA champion (University of Tennessee), 2004 SEC champion (University of Tennessee), two-time high school state champion
- Shannon Woodward - actress, Raising Hope, The Riches, Westworld

== Theater ==
The Olympic Heights Theatre Department, Thespian Troupe 4992, was established in 1991, and has grown to hold a significant place in the Boca Raton community. The department has won several state championships, produced over 40 mainstages, performed at hundreds of community centers, brought home dozens of Cappies and Critics Choice awards, raised significant sums for Broadway Cares and Equity Fights AIDS, and graduated many students who have gone on to careers as professionals in the arts.

== Little Lions Preschool ==
Olympic Heights has an on-site preschool serving children aged three to four. The preschool offers early childhood education. The high school students enrolled in the Early Childhood and Teacher Education Academy are able to work as teachers in the preschool, where they carry out lesson plans with the children.
