= David Hoelscher =

American football player (born 1975)

No. 91
- Position: Defensive tackle

Personal information
- Born: November 27, 1975 (age 50); Coldwater, Ohio, U.S.
- Listed height: 6 ft 6 in (1.98 m)
- Listed weight: 261 lb (118 kg)

Career information
- High school: Versailles
- College: Eastern Kentucky
- NFL draft: 1998: undrafted

Career history
- Green Bay Packers (1998)*; Washington Redskins (1998)
- * Offseason or practice squad member only
- Stats at Pro Football Reference

David Henry Hoelscher (born November 27, 1975) is an American former professional football player who was a defensive tackle for the Washington Redskins of the National Football League (NFL). He played college football for the Eastern Kentucky Colonels before playing one game with the Redskins in 1998.
