= Deon Humphrey =

American football player (born 1976)

No. 58, 53, 56
- Position: Linebacker

Personal information
- Born: May 7, 1976 (age 50); Clewiston, Florida, U.S.
- Listed height: 6 ft 3 in (1.91 m)
- Listed weight: 240 lb (109 kg)

Career information
- High school: Lake Worth (FL)
- College: Florida State
- NFL draft: 1999: undrafted

Career history
- Green Bay Packers (1999)*; Amsterdam Admirals (2000); San Diego Chargers (2000)*; Carolina Panthers (2000); San Diego Chargers (2000–2001); Jacksonville Jaguars (2003)
- * Offseason or practice squad member only
- Stats at Pro Football Reference

Deon Morie Humphrey (born May 7, 1976) is an American former professional football player who was a linebacker in the National Football League (NFL) from 1999 to 2003. He played college football for the Florida State Seminoles.

Originally an All-American safety coming out of Lake Worth (Florida), Humphrey was later converted into an outside linebacker.
