= Ken Anderson (defensive lineman) =

American football player (1975–2009)

No. 70
- Position: Defensive tackle

Personal information
- Born: October 4, 1975; Shreveport, Louisiana, U.S.
- Died: April 3, 2009 (aged 33); Fayetteville, Arkansas, U.S.
- Listed height: 6 ft 3 in (1.91 m)
- Listed weight: 310 lb (141 kg)

Career information
- High school: Captain Shreve (Shreveport, Louisiana)
- College: Arkansas (1994–1997)
- NFL draft: 1998: undrafted

Career history
- Chicago Bears (1998–1999); Rhein Fire (2000); Orlando Rage (2001)

Career NFL statistics
- Games played: 2
- Games started: 0
- Pancakes: 0
- Stats at Pro Football Reference

Ken Anderson (October 4, 1975 – April 3, 2009) was a professional American football defensive tackle in the National Football League. He played with the Chicago Bears in 1999. He died of a heart attack on April 3, 2009, at age 33.
