= Rob Hart =

English gridiron football player (born 1974)

No. 2, 8, 9
- Position: Placekicker

Personal information
- Born: 4 November 1974 (age 52)
- Listed height: 4 ft 7 in (1.40 m)

Career information
- College: Murray State

Career history
- London Monarchs (1998); Scottish Claymores (1999–2004); Tampa Bay Buccaneers (2002)*; Miami Dolphins (2003)*; New Orleans Saints (2004)*
- * Offseason or practice squad member only

Awards and highlights
- 2× NFL Europe All-League

Rob Hart (born 4 November 1974) is an English former American football placekicker in NFL Europe. He played for the England Monarchs in 1998 and Scottish Claymores from 1999 to 2004. He played college football at Murray State University in Kentucky.

He also was a member of the National Football League's Tampa Bay Buccaneers, Miami Dolphins and New Orleans Saints.

Hart is well known because he kicked barefoot.

== Early life ==
Hart initially played association football, and was a member of Southampton F.C.'s Under-16 team, but quit due to believing he could not receive a professional contract. Hart first became interested in American football after watching the Dolphins reach Super Bowl XIX. He played quarterback, running back and cornerback.

== College career ==
Hart attended Sheffield University for a year before transferring to the United States' Murray State University. After redshirting his first year, he spent three years as a kicker for the Murray State Racers football team, and received all-Ohio Valley Conference and preseason All-American honors in 1997.

Hart graduated with a degree in American history.

== Professional career ==
=== NFL Europe ===
Upon receiving his degree, Hart joined the England Monarchs. In 1999, he was signed by the Scottish Claymores.

Hart missed a game-tying 42-yard field goal in World Bowl 2000 with eight seconds left. Two years later, Hart converted all ten field goals and twenty points after touchdowns, and the year after, was NFL Europe's leading scorer with 64 points. After tryouts in the NFL, Hart returned to the Claymores in 2004.

Hart finished his NFL Europe career as one of the league's top kickers, being a two-time All-League member. During the 2004 season, Hart became the league's all-time leading scorer with 333 points.

=== NFL ===
In 2002, Hart tried out for the Tampa Bay Buccaneers, but was cut after two preseason games. He was signed by the Miami Dolphins on 24 July 2003, and intended to compete with Olindo Mare, but suffered a hamstring injury. He was waived on 27 August 2003. On 14 July 2004, Hart returned to the NFL after being signed by the Saints, but was released on 5 September.

== Personal life ==
During his career, Hart worked as a recruiting consultant for Ranstad, retail with Virgin Records and as a substitute teacher.
