= Quincy Coleman =

American gridiron football player (born 1975)

Quincy Coleman (born May 23, 1975, in Macon, Mississippi) is an American former gridiron football defensive back in the Canadian Football League (CFL). He played college football for Jackson State University.

He was signed by the Edmonton Eskimos on November 10, 2001; re-signed by Edmonton on March 8, 2004. He was released in March 2005. Signed with the Ottawa Renegades as a free agent on April 7, 2005.

In 2005 Coleman recorded 46 tackles, five pass knockdowns, one fumble recovery and one interception in his first season with the Renegades. He also played for the Chicago Enforcers of the XFL.
