= Rome Douglas =

American football player (born 1978)

Rome Douglas is an American football offensive lineman. Douglas is the son of Memphis Tigers basketball player James Douglas. He is married to collegiate basketball coach Maylana Martin.

== Scholastic football ==
Douglas played football at Claremont High School, where as a 6'7" teenager, he was called "Big Rome." Honored as "All American" by Blue Chip All American, Douglas earned a football scholarship from the University of Southern California, playing as offensive lineman for the USC Trojans from 1995 to 1999. While at USC, he played in the 1995 Cotton Bowl the 1996 Rose Bowl, and the 1998 Sun Bowl, and his team won the 1995 Pacific 10 athletic conference championship.

== Professional NFL career ==
After college, Douglas played for the Jacksonville Jaguars, New York Giants and St. Louis Rams. In 1999, Douglas signed on as offensive tackle for the Jacksonville Jaguars; however, after being placed on reserve due to injury, he spent his off-season playing for NFL Europe. Douglas was drafted by Rhein Fire in the first round and later traded to Berlin Thunder. In his second season, Douglas played for the Barcelona Dragons. Douglas finished his NFL Europe career in the 2000 World Bowl championship before returning to the NFL with the New York Giants and the St. Louis Rams. Later, he played in the Canadian Football League.

== Chronic Traumatic Encephalopathy lawsuit against the NFL ==
Rome Douglas was a plaintiff in a notable lawsuit by former players against the NFL, alleging the league knew of the dangers of concussions and was negligent in its response. The case ended with the NFL settling with the injured players for $765 million.

== See also ==
- List of NFL players with chronic traumatic encephalopathy
