= 2000 Barcelona Dragons season =

NFL Europe team season

2000 Barcelona Dragons (NFL Europe) season
- General manager: Felix Zabala
- Head coach: Jack Bicknell
- Home stadium: Estadi Olímpic de Montjuïc

Results
- Record: 5–5
- Division place: 3rd
- Playoffs: Did not qualify

The 2000 Barcelona Dragons season was the eighth season for the franchise in the NFL Europe League (NFLEL). The team was led by head coach Jack Bicknell in his eighth year, and played its home games at Estadi Olímpic de Montjuïc in Barcelona, Catalonia, Spain. They finished the regular season in third place with a record of five wins and five losses.

== Personnel ==
=== Staff ===
2000 Barcelona Dragons (NFL Europe) staff
Front office: General manager – Felix Zabala; Head coaches: Head coach – Jack Bicknell; Offensive coaches: Offensive coordinator/offensive line – Vince Martino; Quarterbacks/wide receivers – Sam Rutigliano; National Coach/running backs – Juan Jiménez	Defensive coaches: Co-Defensive coordinator/linebackers – Red Kelin; Co-Defensive coordinator/Defensive Backs – Chip Beake; Defensive line – Ken Clarke; Strength and conditioning: Strength and conditioning – Jesse Wright

=== Roster ===
2000 Barcelona Dragons final roster
Quarterbacks: 9 Patrick Bonner; 7 Tony Graziani; 16 Cory Sauter; Running backs: 22 Terry Battle; 21 Jesse Haynes; 32 Denvis Manns; Wide receivers: 19 Eddie Conti; 86 Jeremaine Copeland; 87 Daniel Jones; 84 Sean Morey; 80 Ronnie Powell; 17 Rodney Williams; Tight ends: 88 Matt Cercone; 83 Damian Vaughn	Offensive linemen: 69 Eric Bateman T; 71 Gary Brown G/T; 78 Ed Ellis T; 64 Lennie Friedman G; 62 Matt Hogg C; 65 O'Lester Pope T; 75 Glenn Rountree G; 57 Jason Watts C; 72 Mike Webster G; Defensive linemen: 98 Vince Amey DE; 97 William Carr DT; 55 Willie Cohens DE; 93 Chuck Darby DT; 60 Garrett Johnson DT; 90 Jarett Loggins DT; 50 Tim Martin DE	Linebackers: 54 Marc Megna OLB; 51 Brandon Southward MLB; 58 Joe Tuipala OLB; 59 Frank Pace MLB; 56 Dave Thomas OLB; Defensive backs: 25 DeAuntae Brown CB; 33 Kelly Herndon CB; 28 Chris Jones S; 26 Marvin Love CB; 24 Tyrone Smith CB; 31 Ryan Sutter S; 36 Brad Trout S; 24 Brad Ware S; Special teams: 2 Chris Hanson P	National players: 14 (Spain) Jesús Angoy K; 20 (France) Samyr Hamoudi S; 30 (France) Xavier LaFont CB; 1 (Mexico) Marco Martos WR; 23 (Spain) Jason Miller-Lopez RB; 46 (Spain) Vicenc Rodriguez TE; 82 (Mexico) Carlos Rosado WR; Rookies in italics

== Schedule ==
Week	Date	Kickoff (Note: All times local to where the game was played.)	Opponent	Results		Game site	Attendance
Week	Date	Kickoff	Opponent	Final score	Team record	Game site	Attendance
1	Saturday, April 15	7:00 p.m.	at Rhein Fire	L 17–28	0–1	Rheinstadion	28,924
2	Monday, April 24	5:00 p.m.	Berlin Thunder	L 21–28	0–2	Estadi Olímpic de Montjuïc	7,500
3	Sunday, April 30	7:00 p.m.	at Amsterdam Admirals	W 27–20	1–2	Amsterdam ArenA	9,042
4	Saturday, May 6	7:00 p.m.	Rhein Fire	L 7–18	1–3	Estadi Olímpic de Montjuïc	21,200
5	Saturday, May 13	7:00 p.m.	at Frankfurt Galaxy	W 42–26	2–3	Waldstadion	32,888
6	Saturday, May 20	7:00 p.m.	Amsterdam Admirals	W 22–16	3–3	Estadi Olímpic de Montjuïc	8,100
7	Saturday, May 27	3:00 p.m.	at Scottish Claymores	L 0–28	3–4	Hampden Park	8,827
8	Saturday, June 3	7:00 p.m.	at Berlin Thunder	W 22–9	4–4	Jahn-Sportpark	7,932
9	Sunday, June 11	7:00 p.m.	Frankfurt Galaxy	L 8–14	4–5	Estadi Olímpic de Montjuïc	9,300
10	Sunday, June 18	7:00 p.m.	Scottish Claymores	W 28–25	5–5	Estadi Olímpic de Montjuïc	8,200

== Standings ==
NFL Europe League
Team	W	L	T	PCT	PF	PA	Home	Road	STK
Rhein Fire	7	3	0	.700	279	209	5–0	2–3	W1
Scottish Claymores	6	4	0	.600	273	165	4–1	2–3	L1
Barcelona Dragons	5	5	0	.500	194	212	2–3	3–2	W1
Amsterdam Admirals	4	6	0	.400	206	243	3–2	1–4	L3
Frankfurt Galaxy	4	6	0	.400	206	269	1–4	3–2	W2
Berlin Thunder	4	6	0	.400	189	249	3–2	1–4	L1
