= Pepe Pearson =

American football player and coach (born 1975)

Tarleton State Texans
- Title: Associate head coach & Running backs coach

Personal information
- Born: December 11, 1975 (age 50); Euclid, Ohio

Career information
- High school: Euclid (OH)
- College: Ohio State
- NFL draft: 1998: undrafted

Career history

Playing
- San Francisco 49ers (1998)*; Jacksonville Jaguars (1998)*; Green Bay Packers (1998)*; Chicago Bears (1998)*; Cleveland Browns (1999)*; Detroit Lions (1999)*; Pittsburgh Steelers (2000)*; Rhein Fire (2000–2001); Tampa Bay Buccaneers (2001)*; Las Vegas Outlaws (2001)*; Dayton Warbirds (2005)
- * Offseason or practice squad member only

Coaching
- Ohio Dominican (2004–2014) Running backs coach; Daytona Beach Hawgs (2005) Head coach; Marion Mayhem (2008–2009) Head coach; Youngstown State (2015) Running backs coach; Marshall (2016–2020) Running backs coach; Tennessee State (2021–2022) Running backs coach; Tarleton State (2023–present) Associate head coach & running backs coach

Operations
- Marion Mayhem (2008–2009) General manager

Awards and highlights
- World Bowl champion (2000); Rose Bowl champion (1997); Second-team All-Big Ten (1996)

Pepe Pearson (born December 11, 1975) is an American former football tailback, starting in college for the Ohio State Buckeyes, and is currently the running backs coach for the Tarleton State Texans.

== Playing career ==
A four-year letterwinner at Ohio State, Pearson is the Buckeye's ninth all-time leading rusher with 3,121 yards). trailing only Archie Griffin, Ezekiel Elliott, Eddie George, Tim Spencer, Beanie Wells, Braxton Miller, Keith Byars, and Carlos Hyde. His 1,484 rushing yards as a junior is the tenth highest season total in team history. Pearson's had a 173-yard rushing performance in Ohio State's 1996 victory over Notre Dame.

As a player, Pearson helped Ohio State to four straight bowl appearances from 1994 to 1997, including a 1997 Rose Bowl victory. As a junior, Pearson gained 1,484 yards and scored 17 touchdowns on 299 carries. He was selected All-Big Ten and team Most Valuable Player (MVP) for his efforts.

After completing his college career, Pearson spent time in the National Football League with the Chicago Bears and Pittsburgh Steelers. His greatest professional success came in NFL Europe where he scored the game-winning touchdown for the Rhein Fire to win the 2000 World Bowl Championship. He later spent time with the Dayton Warbirds, an expansion team in the National Indoor Football League.

== Coaching career ==
After his playing career ended, Pearson began a career in coaching. From 2004 to 2015 he was the running backs coach for Ohio Dominican University. In 2005, he was also the head coach of the Daytona Beach Hawgs of the National Indoor Football League, leading them to a playoff berth just before the team was disbanded. He was also the head coach for the now defunct Marion Mayhem of the Continental Indoor Football League (CIFL). In 2015, he joined Bo Pelini at Youngstown State to be their running backs coach, having a successful first year with his team accumulating more than 2,000 rushing yards. In 2016, he left Youngstown and joined Marshall in Huntington, WV.

Pepe Pearson was hired as running backs coach at Tennessee State University in May 2021 after spending five seasons in the same position at Marshall.

Multiple running backs gained notoriety under Pearson at Marshall. In 2019, Brenden Knox was named Conference USA's Most Valuable Player after rushing for 1,387 yards and 11 touchdowns. Keion Davis earned Gasparilla Bowl MVP honors with his 94-yard rushing, two touchdown performance in 2018.

Pearson helped guide Marshall to bowl victories in the 2017 New Mexico Bowl, and the 2018 Gasparilla Bowl. He also helped the Thundering Herd win the 2020 Conference USA East Division Championship, helping Marshall reach the 2020 Conference USA Football Championship Game, before falling to UAB 13–22.

Pearson joined the Thundering Herd after one season in the same position at Youngstown State after spending 10 seasons at Ohio Dominican.

In his final season with the Panthers, ODU finished 11-2 and advanced to the third round of the NCAA Division II playoffs. Pearson helped running back Brandon Schoen earn multiple receive All-GLIAC honors on his way to becoming the programs all-time leading rusher.

Pearson produced two 1,000 yard rushers in 2013 for the first time in school history and mentored Mike Noffsinger to become a Harlon Hill Trophy semifinalist, honoring the best Division II players in the country.

In his final four seasons with the Panthers, Pearson took over the special teams duties in addition to coaching the running backs.
