= Aaron Stecker =

American football player (born 1975)

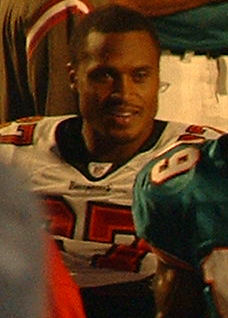
- Stecker with the Tampa Bay Buccaneers in 2003

No. 27
- Position: Running back

Personal information
- Born: November 13, 1975 (age 50); Green Bay, Wisconsin, U.S.
- Listed height: 5 ft 10 in (1.78 m)
- Listed weight: 213 lb (97 kg)

Career information
- High school: Ashwaubenon (Ashwaubenon, Wisconsin)
- College: Western Illinois; Wisconsin
- NFL draft: 1999: undrafted

Career history
- Chicago Bears (1999)*; Tampa Bay Buccaneers (1999–2003); New Orleans Saints (2004–2008); Atlanta Falcons (2009)
- * Offseason or practice squad member only

Awards and highlights
- Super Bowl champion (XXXVII); NFL Europe Offensive MVP (2000)

Career NFL statistics
- Rushing attempts: 386
- Rushing yards: 1,526
- Receptions: 166
- Receiving yards: 1,175
- Return yards: 3,934
- Total touchdowns: 12
- Stats at Pro Football Reference

Aaron Stecker (born November 13, 1975) is an American former professional football player who was a running back in the National Football League (NFL). He played college football for the Western Illinois Leathernecks and Wisconsin Badgers. He was signed by the Chicago Bears as an undrafted free agent in 1999.

Stecker also played for the Tampa Bay Buccaneers, New Orleans Saints, and Atlanta Falcons. He earned a Super Bowl ring with the Buccaneers in Super Bowl XXXVII.

Mainly used as a backup for most of his career, Stecker started 14 games during his five years with the Saints, and also often served as a kick returner for both Tampa Bay and New Orleans.

On April 20, 2010, Stecker announced that he was retiring from football, although later in 2010, he worked out for, but did not sign with, the Green Bay Packers.

== Early life ==
Stecker attended Ashwaubenon High School in Ashwaubenon, Wisconsin, and was a letterman in football and baseball. He led the Ashwaubenon football team to the state championship game in 1993. His number, 27, has been retired.

== College career ==
Stecker began his college career at Wisconsin in 1995. He spent two years with the University of Wisconsin, recording three 100-yard games, a 100-yard kick return for a touchdown, and a 63-yard punt return for a touchdown. In 1997, he transferred to Western Illinois after the emergence of future Heisman Trophy winner Ron Dayne pushed Stecker from his starting role with the Badgers. During the 1997 season, Stecker recorded 2,293 rushing yards en route to winning the Gateway Football Conference player of the year award. Stecker finished his career at Western Illinois as the school's all-time leading rusher, with 3,799 yards in just two seasons. This record was broken by Travis Glasford in 2005, and is now held by Herb Donaldson, as of 2008.

== Professional career ==
Pre-draft measurables
Height	Weight	Arm length	Hand span	40-yard dash	10-yard split	20-yard split	20-yard shuttle	Three-cone drill	Vertical jump	Broad jump	Bench press
5 ft 9 1/2 in (1.77 m)	210 lb (95 kg)	29 1/4 in (0.74 m)	9 1/2 in (0.24 m)	4.82 s	1.74 s	2.83 s	4.17 s	7.00 s	32.5 in (0.83 m)	9 ft 5 in (2.87 m)	23 reps
All values from NFL Combine

=== Chicago Bears ===
Stecker spent the 1999 training camp with the Chicago Bears; however, he did not make the active roster.

=== Scottish Claymores ===
Before the 2000 season, the Tampa Bay Buccaneers allocated Stecker to the Scottish Claymores of NFL Europe. Stecker led the league in total scrimmage yards through the first two weeks in the season. He wound up garnering Offensive MVP honors.

=== Tampa Bay Buccaneers ===
Early in his career in Tampa Bay, Stecker credits Fred McAfee for bolstering his confidence. During the 2000 season, Stecker began returning kickoffs for the Bucs. During his four years with the team, he became a core special teams player, along with sporadic duty as a pass-catching back. He also won Super Bowl XXXVII with the team before leaving after 2003.

=== New Orleans Saints ===
Signing with the New Orleans Saints before 2004, Stecker became a return man and scat back. Competing with established backs such as Reggie Bush and Deuce McAllister led to sparse playing time. He was placed on injured reserve during the 2008 season and did not return to the team the following year.

=== Atlanta Falcons ===
Stecker was signed by the Atlanta Falcons in the middle the 2009 season, where he played mostly on special teams. He carried the ball five times and caught it five times as well. The Packers also showed interest in Stecker in 2009.

=== Retirement ===
In April 2010, Stecker retired. He was tried out by the Green Bay Packers later that year but did not garner a contract offer.

== NFL career statistics ==
Legend
**Bold**	Career high

=== Regular season ===
Year	Team	Games		Rushing					Receiving					Fumbles	
Year	Team	GP	GS	Att	Yds	Avg	Lng	TD	Rec	Yds	Avg	Lng	TD	Fum	Lost
2000	TB	10	0	12	31	2.6	14	0	1	15	**15.0**	15	0	1	1
2001	TB	13	0	24	72	3.0	17	1	10	101	10.1	35	**1**	0	0
2002	TB	16	1	28	174	**6.2**	**59**	0	13	69	5.3	12	0	3	2
2003	TB	16	1	37	125	3.4	15	0	9	48	5.3	14	**1**	1	0
2004	NO	16	3	58	244	4.2	42	2	29	174	6.0	26	0	1	1
2005	NO	15	4	95	363	3.8	32	0	35	**281**	8.0	41	0	**3**	**3**
2006	NO	12	1	4	11	2.8	4	0	19	190	10.0	**48**	0	0	0
2007	NO	16	6	**115**	**448**	3.9	26	**5**	**36**	211	5.9	26	0	1	1
2008	NO	6	0	8	43	5.4	12	0	9	52	5.8	12	**1**	0	0
2009	ATL	9	0	5	15	3.0	6	0	5	34	6.8	14	0	0	0
Career		129	16	386	1526	4.0	59	8	166	1175	7.1	48	3	10	8

=== Postseason ===
Year	Team	Games		Rushing					Receiving					Fumbles	
Year	Team	GP	GS	Att	Yds	Avg	Lng	TD	Rec	Yds	Avg	Lng	TD	Fum	Lost
2002	TB	3	0	4	18	4.5	9	0	1	3	3.0	3	0	0	0
2006	NO	2	0	0	0	0.0	0	0	0	0	0.0	0	0	0	0
Career		5	0	4	18	4.5	9	0	1	3	3.0	3	0	0	0

== Personal life ==
Stecker's wife Kara is the daughter of Diane Hendricks and the late Ken Hendricks, founder of ABC Supply. They have two children, daughter, Skylar, and son, Dorsett.Dorsett has committed to UW- Madison for football. Skylar is a singer: by age 12 she had sung the national anthem at Wisconsin Badgers, New Orleans Saints, UCLA, and Green Bay Packers games.
