= 2000 NFL Europe season =

Football season in the year 2000

The 2000 NFL Europe season was the eighth season in 10 years of the American football league that started out as the World League of American Football.

NFL Europe League
Team	W	L	T	PCT	PF	PA	Home	Road	STK
Rhein Fire	7	3	0	.700	279	209	5–0	2–3	W1
Scottish Claymores	6	4	0	.600	273	165	4–1	2–3	L1
Barcelona Dragons	5	5	0	.500	194	212	2–3	3–2	W1
Amsterdam Admirals	4	6	0	.400	206	243	3–2	1–4	L3
Frankfurt Galaxy	4	6	0	.400	206	269	1–4	3–2	W2
Berlin Thunder	4	6	0	.400	189	249	3–2	1–4	L1

== World Bowl 2000 ==
Rhein 13-10 Scotland Sunday, June 25, 2000 Waldstadion Frankfurt, Germany
