= World Bowl 2000 =

American football championship game

Rhein Fire	Scottish Claymores
13	10
	1	2	3	4	Total
RHE	3	3	0	7	13
SCO	7	3	0	0	10
- Date: Sunday, June 25, 2000
- Stadium: Waldstadion; Frankfurt, Germany
- MVP: Aaron Stecker, running back
- Referee: Bill Leavy
- Attendance: 35,860

Ceremonies
- Halftime show: Five

TV in the United States
- Network: Fox
- Announcers: Sam Rosen and Bill Maas

World Bowl 2000 (also referred to as World Bowl VIII) was the eighth championship game of the NFL Europe League. It was held at Waldstadion in Frankfurt, Germany on June 25, 2000. The match-up was between the 6–4 Scottish Claymores and the 7–3 Rhein Fire. 35,860 fans were in attendance to witness the Fire coming from behind to win a close game 13–10 in the second-lowest scoring World Bowl played (only the inaugural World Bowl yielding fewer points). Claymores running back Aaron Stecker was named MVP in the losing cause, rushing for 92 yards including a 36-yard TD.

== Background ==
The Fire won the first meeting 22–10 in Düsseldorf, while the Claymores won the second meeting 31–24 in Scotland.

== Game summary ==
In this low-scoring affair, the Rhein Fire struck first when they went 51 yards on 11 plays in the opening drive, but they could only come up with a 21-yard field goal by Manfred Burgsmüller. The Claymores responded with their opening drive, by going 75 yards on only three plays and gracefully capping it off with a 36-yard run by running back Aaron Stecker. In the second quarter, the Claymores increased their lead by going 52 yards on 12 plays, yet ending up with a 32-yard field goal by Rob Hart. The Fire managed to respond on an eight-play, 34-yard drive, but the Claymore defense made Rhein settle for a 23-yard field goal by Burgsmüller. Heading into halftime, the Claymores led 10–6 and feeling confident that they would win another championship title. In the second half of the game, both sides failed to score a single point in the third quarter. In the fourth quarter, it seemed like the Claymores had the game all but won. However, the Fire refused to go down without a fight. Getting the ball with 5:07 left on the clock, Fire quarterback Danny Wuerffel led his team on an eight-play, 43-yard drive that was not only time-consuming, but Fire running back Pepe Pearson scored the game-winning touchdown from a yard out. Even though the Claymores got the ball back and managed to gel some reasonable yardage, Hart's 40-yard field goal attempt (which would have tied the game up) went wide left, preserving Rhein's small lead and giving them their second World Bowl title in three years.

World Bowl 2000 was the final game in charge for the two head coaches, who up until then had each taken charge of every game in team history. Both would depart for the newly created XFL, with Rhein's Galen Hall taking charge of the Orlando Rage and Scotland's Jim Criner at the Las Vegas Outlaws.

Scoring summary

Quarter	Time	Drive			Team	Scoring information	Score	
Quarter	Time	Plays	Yards	TOP	Team	Scoring information	Rhein	Scotland
1	9:48	11	51		Rhein	21-yard field goal by Manfred Burgsmüller	3	0
1	8:38	3	75		Scotland	Aaron Stecker 36-yard touchdown run, Rob Hart kick good	3	7
2	9:03	12	52		Scotland	32-yard field goal by Rob Hart	3	10
2	4:59	8	34		Rhein	23-yard field goal by Manfred Burgsmüller	6	10
4	1:12	8	43		Rhein	Pepe Pearson 1-yard touchdown run, Manfred Burgsmüller kick good	13	10
"TOP" = time of possession. For other American football terms, see Glossary of American football.							13	10
