= Chase Fourcade =

American football player and coach (born 1997)

Central Arkansas Bears
- Title: Quarterbacks coach

Personal information
- Born: December 17, 1997 (age 28); Metairie, Louisiana, U.S.
- Listed height: 6 ft 0 in (1.83 m)
- Listed weight: 200 lb (91 kg)

Career information
- High school: Archbishop Rummel (Jefferson Parish, Louisiana)
- College: Nicholls (2016–2019)
- NFL draft: 2020: undrafted

Career history

Playing
- Columbus Lions (2021); Calgary Stampeders (2022)*; Alabama Airborne (2022)*; Pittsburgh Maulers (2023)*; Louisiana VooDoo (2024)
- * Offseason or practice squad member only

Coaching
- St. James HS (LA) (2023) Volunteer assistant coach; West Jefferson HS (LA) (2024) Offensive coordinator; Central Arkansas (2025–present) Quarterbacks coach

Awards and highlights
- Southland Conference Offensive Player of the Year (2018, 2019); First-team All-Southland (2018, 2019)

Chase Fourcade (born December 17, 1997) is an American college football coach and former quarterback. He is the quarterbacks coach for the University of Central Arkansas, a position he has held since 2025. He played college football for Nicholls. He had stints with the Columbus Lions of the National Arena League (NAL), Calgary Stampeders of the Canadian Football League (CFL), Alabama Airborne of Major League Football (MLFB), the Pittsburgh Maulers of the United States Football League (USFL), and the Louisiana VooDoo of the Arena Football League (AFL)

While with Nicholls, Fourcade became the school's all-time career leader in passing yards, passing touchdowns, completion percentage, total yards, rushing touchdowns, and touchdowns responsible for. He also earned two All-Southland First Team honors and a nod for All-Louisiana First Team and All-Louisiana Second Team in 2018 and 2019 respectively. He earned the honors of Southland Conference Offensive Player of the Year in back-to-back years in 2018 and 2019.

Fourcade's uncle, John Fourcade, played for Ole Miss and the New Orleans Saints of the National Football League (NFL).

== Early life ==
Fourcade was born on December 17, 1997, in Metairie, Louisiana. He attended Archbishop Rummel High School in Jefferson Parish, Louisiana, where he played high school football and baseball. He was a three-year starter and won two Division I state titles.

Fourcade was an All-State honorable mention and a First-Team catcher on The New Orleans Advocate's All-Metro Team.

As a sophomore in 2013, Fourcade led the Raiders to a Division I state championship.

As a junior in 2014, Fourcade led the school to an 11–1 record and was named to the NOLA.com | The Times-Picayune All-District 9-5A team. He threw for 1,652 yards and fourteen touchdowns while also rushing for 513 yards and thirteen touchdowns as the team reached the Division I semifinals.

As a senior in 2015, Fourcade earned Class 5A All-State honors and a nod for New Orleans All-Metro honorable mention list. He was also named as the 2015 Clarion Herald Player of the Year. He was rated as a two-star dual threat quarterback.

College recruiting
Name	Hometown	School	Height	Weight	Commit date
Chase Fourcade; QB	Metairie, Louisiana	Archbishop Rummel High School	6 ft 0 (Note: listed at 5'11 by rivals.com) in (1.83 m)	180 lb (82 kg)	Jul 27, 2015
Chase Fourcade; QB	Recruit ratings: Scout: Rivals: 247Sports: ESPN:				
Overall recruit ranking: 247Sports: 3513
Note: In many cases, Scout, Rivals, 247Sports, On3, and ESPN may conflict in their listings of height and weight.; In these cases, the average was taken. ESPN grades are on a 100-point scale.; Sources: "2016 Team Ranking". Rivals.com.

== College career ==
In 2016, Fourcade made his college football debut against FBS opponent No. 9 Georgia. He threw his first career touchdown in the third quarter to Jarrell Rogers to put the Colonels up 14–13. He threw his second touchdown pass with less than four minutes left to put the game within two but the team could not pull off the upset falling 24–26 against Jacob Eason and the Bulldogs. He finished his debut going nine of 19 for 99 yards and two touchdowns and two interceptions. The following week against Incarnate Word he led the team to a 35–28 win after throwing for 289 yards and two touchdowns. He would start all eleven games, including the last nine, for the fourth-most passing yards in program history with 2,482. He threw for a season-high 341 passing yards in a win over No. 22 McNeese State despite the 13–38 loss. He earned an honorable mention for All-Southland and HERO Sports FCS All-American while also finishing in sixth place for the Jerry Rice Award, which is awarded to the nation's top freshman.

In 2017, Fourcade started eleven of twelve games for the Colonels. He did not start in the team's rivalry game against Northwestern State due to injury, but he would play in that game and lead the game-winning drive. To start the season he threw for three touchdowns and 213 yards in a 37–35 win over McNeese State. Against Houston Christian he threw a game-winning 44-yard touchdown to Dai'Jean Dixon to beat the Huskies 23–17. En route to an FCS playoff appearance the team only lost three games against Texas A&M, No. 3 Sam Houston State, and against rival Southeastern Louisiana. Against No. 16 South Dakota, in his postseason debut Fourcade threw three interceptions, including two in the first quarter. Despite the poor performance through the air the team only lost 31–38. He led the team in rushing with 89 yards. He finished the season with an eighth-best single-season total of 2,316 yards; becoming only the second Colonel to throw for 2,000 yards in two separate seasons.

=== Statistics ===
Year	Team	Games		Passing								Rushing			
Year	Team	GP	Record	Comp	Att	Pct	Yards	Avg	TD	Int	Rate	Att	Yards	Avg	TD
2016	Nicholls	11	5–6	201	365	55.1	2,482	6.8	18	14	120.8	102	324	3.2	9
2017	Nicholls	12	7–4	162	298	54.4	2,316	7.8	14	13	126.4	83	279	3.4	1
2018	Nicholls	13	9–4	214	352	60.8	2,930	8.3	21	8	145.9	152	659	4.3	13
2019	Nicholls	14	9–5	227	335	67.8	2,979	8.9	17	12	152.0	170	635	3.7	12
Career		50	30−19	804	1,350	59.6	10,707	7.9	70	49	136.3	507	1,897	3.7	35

=== Nicholls records ===
Career records:

- Passing yards: 10,707
- Passing touchdowns: 70
- Completion percentage: 59.6%
- Total yards: 12,604
- Rushing touchdowns: 35
- Touchdowns responsible for: 105
- Pass attempts: 1,350
- Completions: 804
- 200-yard games: 28
- Plays: 1,875

Single season:

- Completion percentage: 67.8% (2019)

=== Honors ===
2016

- HERO Sports FCS Freshman All-American Honorable Mention
- All-Southland Honorable Mention
- Sixth in STATS FCS Jerry Rice Award

2017

- LSWA Offensive Player of the Week (10/30)

2018

- Southland Conference Player of the Year
- All-Southland First Team
- All-Louisiana First Team
- CFPA FCS National Performer of the Year Watch List
- Southland Offensive Player of the Week (9/22)
- LSWA Offensive Player of the Week (10/30)

2019

- Southland Conference Player of the Year
- All-Southland First Team
- All-Louisiana Second Team
- Southland Offensive Player of the Week (10/5)
- 2× LSWA Offensive Player of the Week (9/14, 10/5)
- STATS FCS Walter Payton Award Watch List

== Professional career ==
Pre-draft measurables
Height	Weight
5 ft 11 5/8 in (1.82 m)	200 lb (91 kg)
Values from Pro Day

=== Columbus Lions ===
After going undrafted in the 2020 NFL draft, Fourcade signed with the Columbus Lions of the National Arena League (NAL) on January 27, 2021. He made his debut for the Lions against the Jersey Flight after starter Mason Espinosa was pulled from the game; Fourcade came in with 1:45 left on the clock up 49–7. The team would not score while he was on the field as he missed a wide open touchdown to Lonnie Outlaw which resulted in a turnover on downs. He finished his season with the team completing six of his fifteen pass attempts for 57 yards and one touchdown.

Fourcade participated in the 2022 Louisiana Pro Day on April 5, 2022, in the New Orleans Saints facility.

=== Calgary Stampeders ===
On April 17, 2022, Fourcade signed with the Calgary Stampeders of the Canadian Football League (CFL) and competed with fellow quarterback Tommy Stevens for the third-string spot behind Jake Maier and Bo Levi Mitchell. He was cut after the preseason following a four of six for 63 yards and a touchdown performance in a 37–7 preseason win over the Edmonton Elks.

=== Alabama Airborne ===
In 2022, Fourcade signed with the Alabama Airborne of Major League Football (MLFB). On July 13, 2022, he reported to the league's first-ever training camp in Mobile, Alabama, with the Alabama Airborne alongside AJ Bush from Illinois and Max Meylor from Wisconsin–Whitewater. Players from the Airborne and two other teams were abruptly kicked out of the hotel they were staying at on July 28, 2022, and shortly thereafter it was announced that the league would suspend the 2022 season.

=== Pittsburgh Maulers ===
On August 31, 2022, Fourcade signed with the Pittsburgh Maulers of the United States Football League (USFL). Heading into the 2023 USFL season he was expected to compete with James Morgan, Connor Sampson, and Troy Williams for a roster spot. Fourcade was released on April 4, 2023.

=== New Orleans VooDoo ===
On December 29, 2023, Fourcade signed with the expansion Louisiana VooDoo of the Arena Football League (AFL).

== Coaching career ==
Fourcade began his coaching career as a volunteer assistant at St. James High School in 2023. In 2024, he served as the offensive coordinator for West Jefferson High School.

On February 3, 2025, Fourcade was hired as the quarterbacks coach for Central Arkansas University, his first collegiate coaching position.

== Personal life ==
Fourcade is the son of Keith and Jill Fourcade. His uncle, John Fourcade, played for Ole Miss and the New Orleans Saints as a quarterback.
