= Montay Crockett =

American football player (born 1993)

Profile
- Position: Wide receiver

Personal information
- Born: December 11, 1993 (age 32); Rock Hill, South Carolina, U.S.
- Listed height: 5 ft 11 in (1.80 m)
- Listed weight: 189 lb (86 kg)

Career information
- High school: South Pointe (Rock Hill, South Carolina)
- College: Georgia Southern
- NFL draft: 2017: undrafted

Career history
- Green Bay Packers (2017)*; Jacksonville Jaguars (2017); Houston Texans (2018)*; Jacksonville Jaguars (2018)*; Arizona Cardinals (2018)*; Washington Redskins (2018)*; Atlanta Legends (2019); Oakland Raiders (2019)*; Winnipeg Blue Bombers (2020–2021)*; BC Lions (2022)*; Alabama Airborne (2022)*; Green Bay Blizzard (2023)*
- * Offseason or practice squad member only
- Stats at Pro Football Reference

Montay Crockett (born December 11, 1993) is an American former football wide receiver. He played college football at Georgia Southern. He was signed by the Green Bay Packers as an undrafted free agent in 2017.

== College career ==
Crockett played college football for Georgia Southern University, appearing in 47 games with 18 starts, totaling 32 receptions for 535 yards and three touchdowns. He also had 15 carries for 144 yards and two touchdowns throughout his career.

== Professional career ==
=== Green Bay Packers ===
Crockett signed with the Green Bay Packers as an undrafted free agent on May 5, 2017. He was waived by the Packers on September 2, 2017.

=== Jacksonville Jaguars ===
On October 30, 2017, Crockett was signed to the Jacksonville Jaguars' practice squad. He was promoted to the active roster on December 26, 2017. He was waived by the Jaguars on January 13, 2018.

=== Houston Texans ===
On January 23, 2018, Crockett was claimed off waivers by the Houston Texans. He was waived by the Texans on May 14, 2018.

=== Jacksonville Jaguars (second stint) ===
On June 6, 2018, Crockett signed with Jacksonville Jaguars. He was waived on September 1, 2018.

=== Arizona Cardinals ===
On November 7, 2018, Crockett was signed to the Arizona Cardinals practice squad. He was waived by the Cardinals on December 4, 2018.

=== Washington Redskins ===
On December 18, 2018, Crockett was signed to the Washington Redskins practice squad.

=== Atlanta Legends ===
In 2019, Crockett joined the Atlanta Legends of the Alliance of American Football.

=== Oakland Raiders ===
After the AAF ceased operations in April 2019, Crockett signed with the Oakland Raiders on June 11, 2019. On July 15, 2019, the Raiders waived Crockett.

=== Winnipeg Blue Bombers ===
Crockett signed with the Winnipeg Blue Bombers of the CFL on May 28, 2020. After the CFL canceled the 2020 season due to the COVID-19 pandemic, Crockett chose to opt-out of his contract with the Blue Bombers on September 3, 2020. He opted back in to his contract on January 8, 2021.

=== BC Lions ===
On January 18, 2022, Crockett signed with the BC Lions of the Canadian Football League (CFL). On June 5, 2022, Crockett was released by the Lions.

=== Alabama Airborne ===
On July 13, 2022, Crockett signed with the Alabama Airborne of Major League Football (MLFB). However the league disbanded before they ever played a game.

=== Green Bay Blizzard ===
On October 26, 2022, Crockett signed with the Green Bay Blizzard of the Indoor Football League (IFL). On February 21, 2023, Crockett refused to report to the Blizzard and became a free agent.
