= Damon Sheehy-Guiseppi =

American gridiron football player (born 1995)

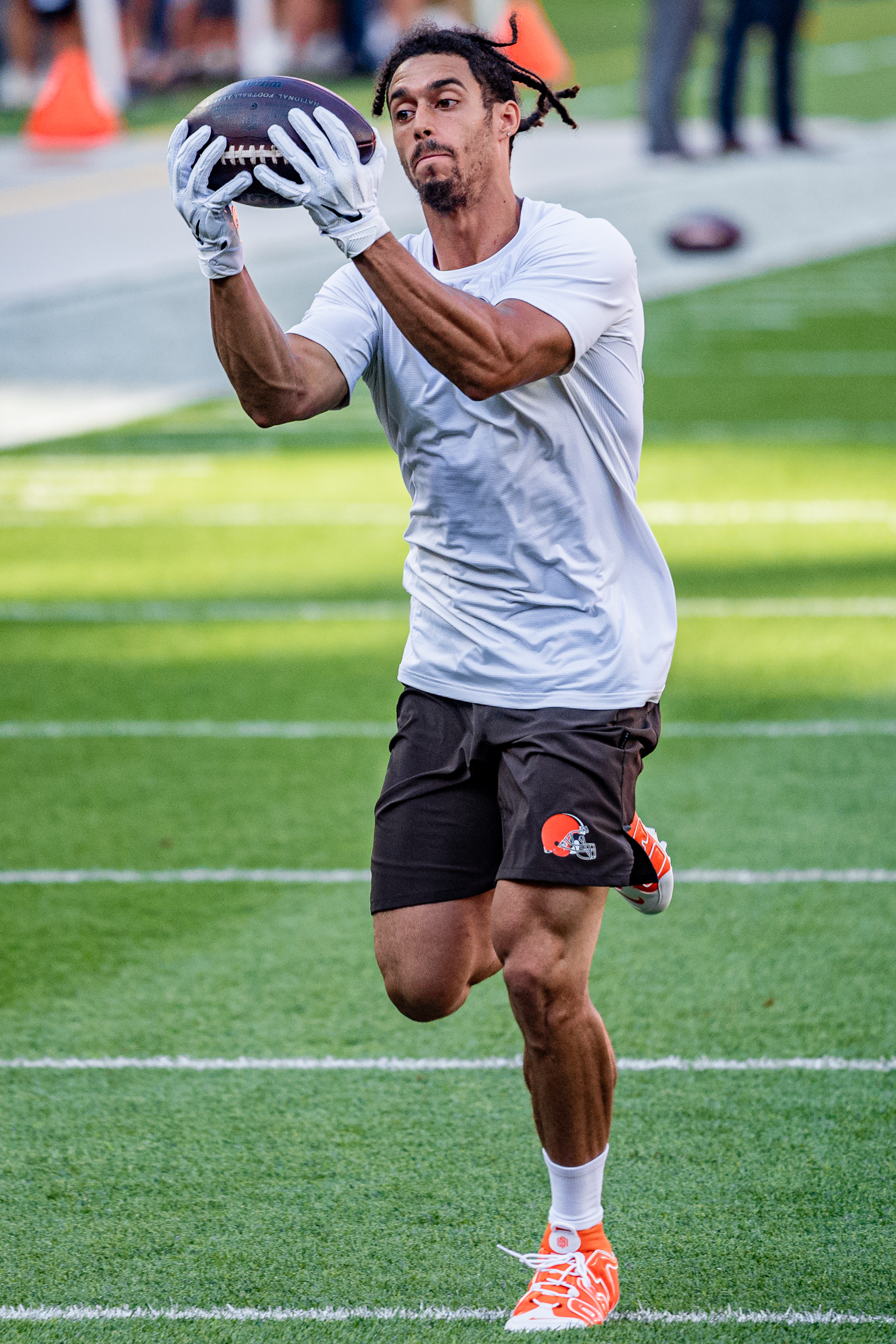
- Sheehy-Guiseppi in 2019

No. 6 – Galo Futebol Americano
- Position: Wide receiver
- Roster status: Active

Personal information
- Born: February 15, 1995 (age 31); Orlando, Florida, U.S.
- Listed height: 6 ft 0 in (1.83 m)
- Listed weight: 181 lb (82 kg)

Career information
- High school: St. Francis (Traverse City, Michigan)
- College: Phoenix College
- NFL draft: 2017: undrafted

Career history
- Cleveland Browns (2019)*; New York Guardians (2020); TSL Alphas (2020); Fan Controlled Football (2021); TSL Linemen (2021); Ottawa Redblacks (2021); Arkansas Attack (2022)*; Legnano Frogs (2024); Arlington Renegades (2025); Siegen Sentinels (2026); Gallos Negros de Querétaro (2026); Galo Futebol Americano (2026)
- * Offseason or practice squad member only

Awards and highlights
- Italian Football League Offensive Player of the Year (2024)
- Stats at Pro Football Reference

Damon Sheehy-Guiseppi (born February 15, 1995) is an American football wide receiver for Galo Futebol Americano of the Superliga Nacional de Futebol Americano. He played college football at Phoenix College.

== Early life ==
After growing up in Lake Havasu City, Arizona and attending Lake Havasu High School for two years, Sheehy-Guiseppi moved to Traverse City, Michigan and attended St. Francis High School.

== College career ==
Sheehy-Guiseppi first attended Mesa Community College, where he ran track, before transferring to Phoenix College and joining the football team. There, Sheehy-Guiseppi was named a first-team NJCAA All-American in 2016, after leading the nation in kick return yardage and touchdowns.

== Professional career ==
=== Cleveland Browns ===
After being out of football for two years and not having played since 2016, Sheehy-Guiseppi was jobless and homeless, sleeping outside of a gym in Miami, Florida. After receiving a tip about the location of the Cleveland Browns free agent workout, he decided to take his chances to try out for the team, despite not receiving an invitation. By Sheehy-Guiseppi's own admission, he was only allowed at the workout by claiming to know Cleveland Browns Vice President of Player Personnel Alonzo Highsmith, and he impressed Highsmith enough to be invited to another tryout for the Browns a week later. The Browns officially signed him on April 5, 2019. During the team's OTAs, he competed for the kick returner position with Antonio Callaway, Dontrell Hilliard and D'Ernest Johnson.

In Cleveland's first preseason game of the 2019 NFL season against the Washington Redskins, Sheehy-Guiseppi returned a punt 86 yards for a touchdown. On August 31, he was waived by the Browns.

=== New York Guardians ===
On November 22, 2019, Sheehy-Guiseppi was drafted by the New York Guardians in the XFL Supplemental Draft. He was placed on injured reserve on January 8, 2020. Sheehy-Guiseppi was waived by the Guardians from injured reserve on March 12.

=== The Spring League ===
Sheehy-Guiseppi was selected by the Alphas of The Spring League during its player selection draft on October 10, 2020. The spring league players received no salary and must also pay a $350 application fee. By 2019, the application fee had jumped to $2000, as players now also had to cover room and board as part of the fee; players with professional experience are exempt from this fee. Players must also cover their own health insurance. The league folded in 2021.

=== Ottawa Redblacks ===
On September 12, 2021, Sheehy-Guiseppi was signed by the Ottawa Redblacks of the Canadian Football League. He never played in a regular season game and was released.

=== Major League Football ===
In 2022 Sheehy-Guiseppi was signed by the Arkansas Attack from the proposed Major League Football, but the league season was cancelled during training camp.

=== Legnano Frogs ===
On December 17, 2023, Sheehy-Guiseppi signed with the Legnano Frogs of the Italian Football League. In March 2024, he made his long awaited debut scoring two touchdowns in a game. For the season, Sheehy-Guiseppi led the league in receptions, yards and receiving TD's and he was named the Italian Football League 2024 offensive player of the year. The Frogs lost in the league playoffs quarterfinal (wild card).

=== Arlington Renegades ===
On December 4, 2024, Sheehy-Guiseppi signed with the Arlington Renegades of the United Football League (UFL).
