= 2022 Major League Football season =

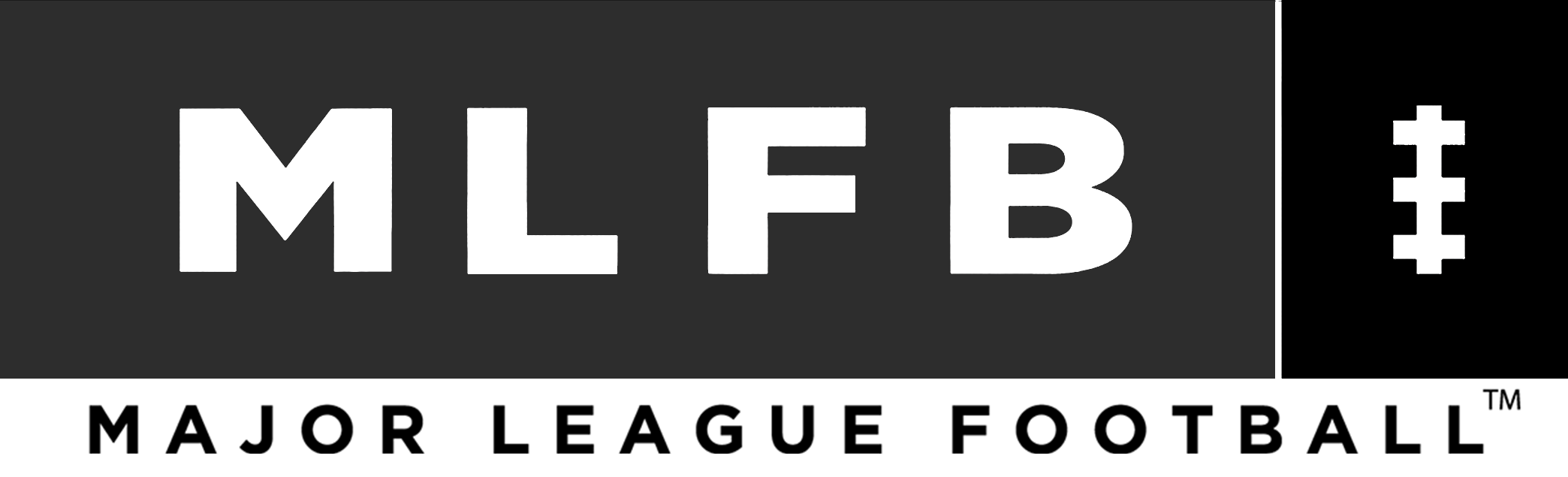
- League: Major League Football
- Sport: American football
- Duration: August 9 – September 6 (planned)
- Games: 4 per team (Regular season)
- Teams: 4

Seasons
- ~~2016~~

The 2022 Major League Football season was the planned inaugural season of Major League Football (MLFB), a publicly traded professional football league. MLFB held its training camps in Ladd–Peebles Stadium in Mobile, Alabama.

This season was considered a "demonstration season" of the self proclaimed "developmental showcase league,” and it consisted of only four teams: Alabama Airborne, Arkansas Attack, Ohio Force and Virginia Armada, which were known as the "Core Four.” It was cancelled during training camp, as players were evicted from the hotels where they were being housed over unpaid bills, while MLFB acknowledged that a "funding delay" had forced the suspension of the season.

== Teams ==
On March 18, 2022, MLFB launched a new website and revealed that there would be only four teams for the first season. At first the plan was to put a team in Texas (Texas Independence) but after the league could not secure a stadium deal on time, they changed their plans and relocated the team to Mobile, Alabama (Alabama Airborne) six weeks before the start of the training camp.

Club	City	Stadium	Capacity	Head coach
Alabama Airborne	Mobile, Alabama	Ladd–Peebles Stadium	40,000	Jerry Glanville
Arkansas Attack	Little Rock, Arkansas	War Memorial Stadium	54,120	Earnest Wilson
Ohio Force	Canton, Ohio	Tom Benson Hall of Fame Stadium	23,000	Bill Conley
Virginia Armada	Virginia Beach, Virginia	Virginia Beach Sportsplex	6,000 (expandable to 17,000)	Terry Shea

== Coaches and players ==
=== Coaches ===
On March 15, 2022, the league announced its first head coach in Jerry Glanville. On March 22, 2022, the league revealed its second coach in Terry Shea. On March 30, 2022, former Ohio Dominican head coach Bill Conley, was announced as the league's third head coach. After some delays and many candidates, MLFB hired their fourth coach for 2022 Earnest Wilson, who was most recently the head coach at Defiance College.

Some of the more recognizable assistants were Jeff Reinebold (QB/WR) Robert Lyles (DL/LB) and Kim McCloud (DB) at Alabama, Art Valero (OL) and Eric Hicks (DL) at Virginia, Morris Watts (QB/WR) at Ohio and Derrius Bell (DC) at Arkansas. Reinebold would leave before the league collapsed to become director of player development at the University of Hawaii.

Coaching interns were supposed to be paid $5,000 plus housing and food.

=== Players ===
Contrary to other start-up leagues, the MLFB elect not to conduct a player draft, and the coaches were responsible for selecting players on their roster. Offseason roster number reported to be around 70 players per team, while each team would be using 53 men rosters for the season. Connor Kaegi (Ohio) was the first player to sign for the 2022 season, while Ohio State Placekicker Dominic DiMaccio signed with the league although he still had college eligibility.

For the 2022 season, the players would've been paid $2,000 per game, with a $500 bonus for wins. In reality, players were paid only $50-a-week stipend during training camp, before the league was shut down, while it was revealed that the league had not paid for the hotels in the city of Mobile and on certain days didn't even provide food to the players.

== Season structure ==
This season was considered a "demonstration season" of the self proclaimed "developmental showcase league,” and it was to consist of only four teams: Alabama Airborne, Arkansas Attack, Ohio Force and Virginia Armada. The MLFB held its training camps in Ladd–Peebles Stadium in Mobile, Alabama, while the championship game was supposed to be at the Tom Benson Hall of Fame Stadium at Pro football hall of fame village at Canton, Ohio.

=== Preseason ===
The MLFB held its training camp for all four teams with over 270 players in one central location - Ladd–Peebles Stadium in Mobile, Alabama, starting on July 17, 2022. On July 24, the league held the "MLFB Jamboree", a scrimmage style open practice, featuring all four teams that was streamed live through the league's YouTube channel.

On July 28, 2022, players from the Alabama Airborne and two other teams were abruptly evicted from the hotels where they were being housed over unpaid bills (rumored to be around $80,000) and reports from coaches that the league had "shut down" prior to the start of the season. MLFB acknowledged that a "funding delay" had forced the suspension of the 2022 season. On August 2 it was reported that MLFB employees’ paychecks were "reversed,” while the league official website was shut down as a result of unpaid bills.

=== Regular season ===
Canceled games

Week 1
Date and time	Away team	Result	Home team	Stadium	Attendance	Broadcast	Viewership (millions)	Rating
August 9, 7:05 p.m. ET	Arkansas Attack		Virginia Armada	Virginia Beach Sportsplex				
August 9, 7:05 p.m. ET	Ohio Force		Alabama Airborne	Ladd–Peebles Stadium				

Week 2
Date and time	Away team	Result	Home team	Stadium	Attendance	Broadcast	Viewership (millions)	Rating
August 16, 7:05 p.m. ET	Virginia Armada		Ohio Force	Tom Benson Hall of Fame Stadium				
August 16, 7:05 p.m. ET	Arkansas Attack		Alabama Airborne	Ladd–Peebles Stadium				

Week 3
Date and time	Away team	Result	Home team	Stadium	Attendance	Broadcast	Viewership (millions)	Rating
August 22, 7:05 p.m. ET	Virginia Armada		Arkansas Attack	War Memorial Stadium				
August 23, 7:05 p.m. ET	Alabama Airborne		Ohio Force	Tom Benson Hall of Fame Stadium				

Week 4
Date and time	Away team	Result	Home team	Stadium	Attendance	Broadcast	Viewership (millions)	Rating
August 30, 7:05 p.m. ET	Ohio Force		Arkansas Attack	War Memorial Stadium				
August 30, 7:05 p.m. ET	Alabama Airborne		Virginia Armada	Virginia Beach Sportsplex				

Championship game

Championship
Date and time	Away team	Result	Home team	Stadium	Attendance	Broadcast	Viewership (millions)	Rating
September 6, TBD				Tom Benson Hall of Fame Stadium				

== Season finances ==
On July 29, 2021, the league claimed it had secured a line of credit for $1,000,000. On April 4, 2022, MLFB announced one definitive term sheet offering a $7.5 million equity line of credit. Days later, the League received a second term sheet for a similar $7.5 million equity line of credit which would give it access to $15 million in capital for the 2022 Season. Neither of these equity lines of credit were actioned on at the time. In early May, MLFB announced they had entered into a $10 million equity line agreement with an institutional investor. This deal was cancelled after, presumably, the league failed to put a team in San Antonio (and later San Marcos).

On July 2, 2022, MLFB announced a partnership with Etix for the 2022 season, as the official online ticketing provider for three of the league's four host markets (Alabama Airborne, Arkansas Attack and Virginia Armada).
