= Bernard Holsey =

American football player (born 1973)

Minnesota State C&T Spartans
- Title: Head coach

Personal information
- Born: December 10, 1973 (age 52); Rome, Georgia, U.S.
- Listed height: 6 ft 2 in (1.88 m)
- Listed weight: 286 lb (130 kg)

Career information
- College: Duke
- NFL draft: 1996: undrafted

Career history

Playing
- New York Giants (1996–1999); Indianapolis Colts (2000); Dallas Desperados (2002); New England Patriots (2002); Washington Redskins (2003); St. Louis Rams (2004)*; Austin Wranglers (2006); Utah Blaze (2006); Columbus Destroyers (2006); Hamilton Tiger-Cats (2006); Orlando Predators (2007)
- * Offseason or practice squad member only

Coaching
- Wittenberg-Birnamwood HS (WI) (2016–2021) Head coach; Arkansas Attack (2022) Defensive line coach; Minnesota State C&T (2023) Defensive coordinator & defensive line coach; Minnesota State C&T (2024–present) Head coach
- Stats at Pro Football Reference

Leonard Bernard Hosley (born December 10, 1973) is an American junior college football coach and former defensive tackle. He is the head football coach for Minnesota State Community and Technical College, a position he has held since 2024. He played in the National Football League for the New York Giants, Indianapolis Colts, New England Patriots, and the Washington Redskins. He played college football at Duke University.

== Early life ==
Born in Cave Spring, Georgia, Holsey attended Coosa High School in Rome, Georgia, where he was a letterman in football and basketball.

He was the head football coach at Wittenberg-Birnamwood High School in Wittenberg, Wisconsin. According to the Wausau Daily Herald.

On November 21, 2023, Holsey was named head football coach at Minnesota State Community and Technical College in Fergus Falls, Minnesota.

== Head coaching record ==
=== Junior college ===
| Year | Team | Overall | Conference | Standing | Bowl/playoffs |
|---|---|---|---|---|---|
Minnesota State C&T Spartans (Minnesota College Athletic Conference) (2024–present)
| 2024 | Minnesota State C&T | 4–5 | 3–3 | T–3rd | L MCAC Semifinal |
| 2025 | Minnesota State C&T | 2–6 | 2–5 | 5th | L MCAC Quarterfinal |
| 2026 | Minnesota State C&T | 5–2 | 4–1 | 2nd | |
| Minnesota State C&T: | | 11–13 | 9–9 | | |
| Total: | | 11–13 | | | |

=== High school ===
| Year | Team | Overall | Conference | Standing | Bowl/playoffs |
|---|---|---|---|---|---|
Wittenberg-Birnamwood Chargers () (2016–2021)
| 2016 | Wittenberg-Birnamwood | 3–6 | 0–6 | 7th | |
| 2017 | Wittenberg-Birnamwood | 6–4 | 4–3 | 4th | |
| 2018 | Wittenberg-Birnamwood | 3–6 | 1–6 | 7th | |
| 2019 | Wittenberg-Birnamwood | 6–4 | 3–3 | 4th | |
| 2020 | Wittenberg-Birnamwood | 2–4 | 1–3 | 6th | |
| 2021 | Wittenberg-Birnamwood | 12–3 | 6–1 | 2nd | |
| Wittenberg-Birnamwood: | | 32–27 | 15–22 | | |
| Total: | | 32–27 | | | |
