= BenJarvus Green-Ellis =

American football player (born 1985)

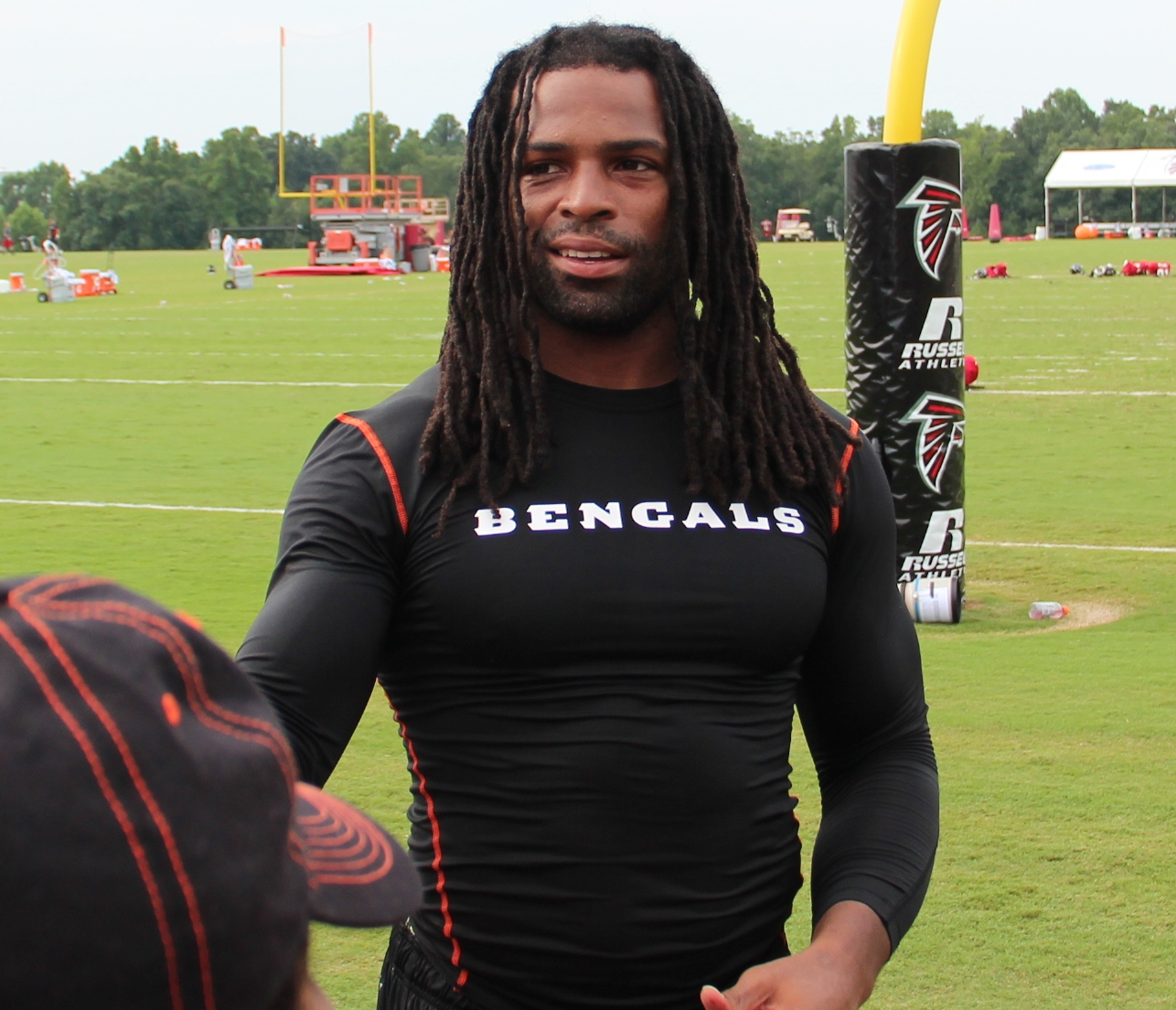
- Green-Ellis in 2013

No. 42
- Position: Running back

Personal information
- Born: July 2, 1985 (age 41); New Orleans, Louisiana, U.S.
- Listed height: 6 ft 0 in (1.83 m)
- Listed weight: 232 lb (105 kg)

Career information
- High school: St. Augustine (New Orleans)
- College: Indiana (2003–2004); Ole Miss (2005–2007)
- NFL draft: 2008: undrafted

Career history
- New England Patriots (2008–2011); Cincinnati Bengals (2012–2013)

Awards and highlights
- First-team All-SEC (2006)

Career NFL statistics
- Rushing attempts: 1,008
- Rushing yards: 3,914
- Receptions: 52
- Receiving yards: 418
- Total touchdowns: 42
- Stats at Pro Football Reference

BenJarvus Jeremy Green-Ellis (born July 2, 1985) is an American former professional football player who was a running back in the National Football League (NFL) for the New England Patriots and Cincinnati Bengals. He played college football for the Indiana Hoosiers and Ole Miss Rebels. Green-Ellis was signed by the Patriots as an undrafted free agent in 2008.

Because of his segmented name, Green-Ellis is nicknamed "the Law Firm". He never had a fumble with the Patriots.

== Early life ==
Green-Ellis was born in New Orleans, Louisiana to Latonia Green and Ronald "Slim" Williams (identified as both Ronald Ellis and Ronald "Slim" Williams in biographical and sports records), the co-founder of the hip hop record label Cash Money Records. He attended St. Augustine High School in New Orleans, and was a student and a letterman in football and track for the Purple Knights athletic teams. He was named as an All-City selection and as an All-Metro selection, and the Clarion Herald and the New Orleans Times-Picayune named him as an All-District selection. Also a standout track athlete, he lettered twice in track & field, where he was an All-District selection and an All-Region selection.

== College career ==
Before transferring to Mississippi, Green-Ellis was a productive running back for Indiana University in the 2003 and 2004 seasons. Green-Ellis transferred when then-coach Gerry DiNardo was fired and replaced by Terry Hoeppner before the 2005 season. As a freshman in 2003, Green-Ellis had a breakout year with 938 yards and seven touchdowns on 225 carries. As a sophomore in 2004, Green-Ellis was a part of a two running back rotation with Chris Taylor. Still, he led the team with 794 yards rushing on 231 carries and scored five touchdowns.

At Ole Miss, Green-Ellis was only the second running back in the school's history to record back-to-back 1,000-yard seasons. As a junior in 2006, Green-Ellis posted 1,000 yards and seven touchdowns on a school record of 234 carries. During his senior season in 2007, he recorded 1,137 yards and six touchdowns. He was named as an All-SEC first-team selection by the Associated Press.

== Professional career ==
Pre-draft measurables
Height	Weight	Arm length	Hand span	40-yard dash	10-yard split	20-yard split	20-yard shuttle	Three-cone drill	Vertical jump	Broad jump	Bench press
5 ft 10 5/8 in (1.79 m)	219 lb (99 kg)	30 3/8 in (0.77 m)	9 in (0.23 m)	4.55 s	1.55 s	2.62 s	4.50 s	7.56 s	34.0 in (0.86 m)	9 ft 8 in (2.95 m)	24 reps
All values from NFL Combine/Pro Day

=== New England Patriots ===
==== 2008 season ====
Green-Ellis was signed by the Patriots as an undrafted free agent on May 1, 2008. He was waived by the team on August 30, 2008, and signed to the team's practice squad on September 1, 2008. He was promoted to the active roster on October 11.

Green-Ellis made his NFL debut on October 12, 2008, recording one catch for nine yards against the San Diego Chargers. October 20, 2008, the same day that the Patriots placed fellow running back Laurence Maroney on injured reserve, Green-Ellis had his first NFL start in the Patriots' 41–7 victory against the Denver Broncos on Monday Night Football. Green-Ellis had 65 yards on 13 rushes in the second half, and scored his first touchdown on a 1-yard run, entering the end zone untouched. During Sunday Night Football's November 2, 2008, broadcast, Al Michaels and John Madden noted that his Patriots teammates had nicknamed Green-Ellis "Law Firm," on account of his multi-part name.

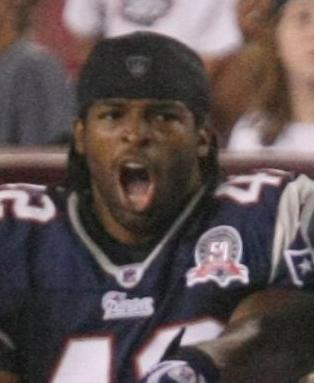
"The Law Firm" in his second season with the Patriots

In Week 10, against the Buffalo Bills, Green-Ellis had his first 100-yard game in the NFL (with 105 yards), and scored a touchdown for the fourth consecutive game, giving him a touchdown in every NFL game he had started at the time. The one-yard touchdown run capped a 92-yard drive whose 19 plays tied a franchise record for most plays on one drive.

==== 2009 season ====
Green-Ellis played in 12 games in the 2009 season. He had 26 carries for 114 rushing yards.

==== 2010 season ====
Following the team's trade of Laurence Maroney and early-season injuries to Fred Taylor and Kevin Faulk, Green-Ellis saw an increased role in the Patriots offense. In Week 3, he rushed for 98 yards on 16 carries (6.1 yard average) and a touchdown in a win over the Buffalo Bills. He made his first start of the season the next week, rushing for 76 yards on 16 carries and adding another touchdown against the Miami Dolphins. In Week 8, against the Minnesota Vikings, he had 17 carries for 112 yards and two touchdowns in the 28–18 victory. On Thanksgiving, Week 12, against the Detroit Lions, Green-Ellis ran for two touchdowns in a Patriots win. He added another two touchdowns in a 45–3 Patriots win over the New York Jets on Monday Night Football in Week 13. In Week 17 against the Dolphins, Green-Ellis eclipsed the 1,000-yard rushing plateau on the season, becoming the first Patriots running back to rush for 1,000 yards since Corey Dillon in 2004.

Green-Ellis finished the 2010 season with 1,008 rushing yards on 229 carries (4.4 yard average), and 13 rushing touchdowns.

==== 2011 season ====
During the 2011 season, Green-Ellis split playing time with several other running backs, primarily Danny Woodhead. In Week 5, a 30–21 victory over the New York Jets, he had 27 carries for 136 yards and two touchdowns. At the end of the 2011 season, Green-Ellis and the Patriots appeared in Super Bowl XLVI. He started the game and had ten carries for 44 yards and two receptions for 15 yards, but the Patriots lost 21–17 to the New York Giants. He rushed for 667 yards from 181 attempts with 11 touchdowns for the AFC Champion Patriots, with a yards per carry average of 3.7. He also had nine receptions for 159 yards.

=== Cincinnati Bengals ===
On March 21, 2012, Green-Ellis signed a three-year contract with the Cincinnati Bengals. On September 23, in a game against Washington, Green-Ellis recorded his first career fumble, ending an impressive record of 589 touches without a fumble. In the following game, a 27–10 win against the Jacksonville Jaguars, Green-Ellis fumbled two more times, but did not have another fumble the rest of the regular season. He had four games going over 100 rushing yards in a five-game span from Weeks 11–15. Despite playing in only fifteen games, he gained 1,000 rushing yards in a season for the second time in his career.

Green-Ellis was paired with rookie Giovani Bernard and as a result of Bernard's effectiveness both rushing and receiving, his snaps declined in the 2013 season. In the 2013 season, Green-Ellis had 220 carries for 756 rushing yards and seven rushing touchdowns. On August 29, 2014, he was released by the Bengals, who added Jeremy Hill in the draft.

== NFL career statistics ==
Year	Team	GP	Rushing						Receiving				Fumbles	
Year	Team	GP	Att	Yds	Avg	Y/G	Lng	TD	Rec	Yds	Lng	TD	Fum	Lost
2008	NE	9	74	275	3.7	30.6	15	5	3	37	20	0	0	0
2009	NE	12	26	114	4.4	9.5	29	0	2	11	6	0	0	0
2010	NE	16	229	1,008	4.4	63.0	33T	13	12	85	16	0	0	0
2011	NE	16	181	667	3.7	41.7	18	11	9	159	53	0	0	0
2012	CIN	15	278	1,094	3.9	72.9	48	6	22	104	13	0	3	2
2013	CIN	16	220	756	3.4	47.3	25	7	4	22	10	0	2	2
Career		84	1,008	3,914	3.9	46.6	48	42	52	418	53	0	5	4
