= Max Meylor =

American football player (born 1998)

No. 7 – Arizona Rattlers
- Position: Quarterback
- Roster status: Active

Personal information
- Born: December 30, 1998 (age 27); Mount Horeb, Wisconsin, U.S.
- Listed height: 6 ft 3 in (1.91 m)
- Listed weight: 220 lb (100 kg)

Career information
- High school: Mt. Horeb (Mount Horeb, Wisconsin)
- College: Lindenwood (2016–2018); Wisconsin–Whitewater (2019–2021)
- NFL draft: 2022: undrafted

Career history
- Alabama Airborne (2022)*; Green Bay Blizzard (2023–2025); Arizona Rattlers (2026–present)
- * Offseason or practice squad member only

Awards and highlights
- IFL National Champion (2026); IFL National Championship Most Valuable Player (2026); IFL Most Valuable Player (2025); First-team All-IFL (2025); WIAC Offensive Player of the Year (2021); 4th-Team All-America (2021); 1st-Team All-WIAC (2021)

Maxwell Meylor (born December 30, 1998) is an American professional football quarterback for the Arizona Rattlers of the Indoor Football League (IFL). He played college football for the Lindenwood Lions before transferring to the Wisconsin–Whitewater Warhawks where he was named WIAC Offensive Player of the Year his senior year. He has also played for Green Bay Blizzard of the IFL.

== Early life ==
Meylor attended Mount Horeb High School in Mount Horeb, Wisconsin. During his career there he threw for 7,609 yards, the sixth-highest in Wisconsin history, he also threw for 68 touchdowns, the ninth-highest in Wisconsin history. He ran for 1,348 yards and completed 62.6 percent of his passes throughout his career. He was a three-time first-team all-conference, two-time all-area, and a second-team all-state as a senior. He was an honorable mention for the all-state as a junior, he was also a 2015 state finalist for the Dave Krieg Award. Meylor also played basketball. He committed to Lindenwood University.

== College basketball career ==
Meylor played college basketball for the Lindenwood Lions. In 2017, he appeared in 24 games while starting in seven. He averaged 3.8 points and 2.9 rebounds a game while shooting 47 percent from the field at the forward position. He finished the season ranked first in offensive rebounds with 29 on the season. He helped lead Lindenwood to a 6–1 record in games he started, having his best game against Douglas College scoring fifteen and one rebound shy of a double-double.

In 2018, Meylor played in 26 games and started fifteen of them. He averaged 5.8 points, 2.7 rebounds, and shot 51.5 percent from the field and a career-high of 47.5 from three-point range. He scored double-digit points in seven games, reaching a season high of fourteen in three different games. Eight of the team's sixteen wins came when Meylor was in the starting lineup.

=== Basketball statistics ===
Season	Team	Games		Stats								
Season	Team	GP	GS	MPG	FG%	3P%	FT%	RPG	APG	SPG	BPG	PPG
2016–17	Lindenwood	24	7	12.5	47%	44%	76%	2.9	0.5	0.1	0.2	3.8
2017–18	Lindenwood	26	15	19.0	52%	48%	65%	2.7	0.7	0.0	0.5	5.8
Career		50	22	15.9	50%	47%	71%	2.8	0.6	0.1	0.3	4.8

== College football career ==
=== Lindenwood ===
In 2016, Meylor was redshirted.

In 2017, Meylor was the team's second-string quarterback. He appeared in four games, going five of eleven for eighty yards alongside one touchdown and one interception. He made his first college pass attempt against Northeastern State which was a fifty-yard touchdown, the fourth-longest pass play of the year for the Lions.

=== Wisconsin–Whitewater ===
Meylor transferred to Wisconsin–Whitewater for the 2019 season.

In 2019, Meylor appeared in twelve games for the Warhawks. He won the team's Newcomer of the Year Award and was named to the Wisconsin Intercollegiate Athletic Conference (WIAC) Scholastic Honor Roll. He finished the year 112 of 190 for 1,171 yards and eleven touchdowns alongside nine interceptions. He ranked seventh in the WIAC in pass efficiency and eighth in passing average per game with 97.6 yards per game. He has a season-high of 314 passing yards in a 65–21 win over Wisconsin–Platteville where he was 22 of 27 and also had four touchdown passes. He led the Warhawks to a 13–2 record and a playoff berth. The team would make it to the 2019 Stagg Bowl where the team would lose to North Central 14–41.

The 2020 Division III season was canceled for the University of Wisconsin–Whitewater and the WIAC because of COVID-19.

In 2021, Meylor's senior season, he was named to the fourth-team All-America, a Gagliardi Trophy semifinalist, second-team All-Region 6, WIAC Offensive Player of the Year, first-team All-WIAC, George Chryst Memorial Bowl Offensive MVP, and winner of the team's Karl Schlender Most Improved award. He finished his collegiate career ranked third in program history in completion percentage (66.5%), fifth in passing touchdowns (47), sixth in completions (351), and seventh in passing yards (4,328). He appeared in fourteen games, leading the team to a 13–1 record. The team's only loss was in the playoffs against the eventual Division III champions Mary Hardin–Baylor.

=== Football statistics ===
Year	Team	Games	Passing							Rushing			
Year	Team	GP	CMP	ATT	%	YDS	TD	INT	LNG	ATT	YDS	TD	LNG
2016	Lindenwood	DNP											
2017	Lindenwood	4	5	11	45%	80	1	1	50	10	18	0	17
2018	Lindenwood	3	6	8	75%	53	1	0	17	2	-15	0	0
2019	Wisconsin–Whitewater	12	122	190	59%	1,171	11	9	52	60	280	4	44
2020	Wisconsin–Whitewater	DNP											
2021	Wisconsin–Whitewater	14	239	338	71%	3,157	36	3	75	76	254	4	35
Career		33	372	547	62.5%	4,461	49	13	75	148	537	8	44

== Professional career ==
Pre-draft measurables
Height	Weight	Arm length	Hand span	20-yard shuttle	Three-cone drill	Vertical jump	Broad jump
6 ft 2 3/4 in (1.90 m)	216 lb (98 kg)	32 in (0.81 m)	9 in (0.23 m)	4.61 s	7.49 s	33 1/2 in (0.85 m)	9 ft 5 in (2.87 m)
All values from Pro Day

=== Alabama Airborne ===
After going undrafted in the 2022 NFL draft, Meylor signed with the Alabama Airborne of the Major League Football (MLFB). The league disbanded before they ever played a game.

=== Green Bay Blizzard ===
On October 20, 2022, Meylor signed with the Green Bay Blizzard of the Indoor Football League (IFL).

Meylor made his debut for the Blizzard in the team's opening week 30–76 loss to the Frisco Fighters. He came in late in the second half in reserve for starter Ja'rome Johnson and finished the game going eight of nineteen for a team-leading 72 yards, one touchdown, and two interceptions.

=== Arizona Rattlers ===
On October 2, 2025, it was announced that Meylor had signed with the IFL's Arizona Rattlers for the 2026 season.

== Personal life ==
Meylor is the son of Joen and Dave Meylor. He graduated from UW-Whitewater with a degree in business administration.
