= 2018 Nicholls Colonels football team =

American college football season

2018 Nicholls Colonels football

Southland co-champion

NCAA Division I Second Round, L 21–42 at Eastern Washington
- Conference: Southland Conference

Ranking
- STATS: No. 14
- FCS Coaches: No. 14
- Record: 9–4 (7–2 Southland)
- Head coach: Tim Rebowe (4th season)
- Offensive coordinator: Rob Christophel (4th season)
- Offensive scheme: Spread
- Defensive coordinator: Tommy Rybacki (4th season)
- Base defense: Multiple 4–3
- Home stadium: John L. Guidry Stadium

2018 Southland Conference football standings
	Conf.			Overall
Team	W		L	W		L
No. 14 Nicholls +^	7	–	2	9	–	4
Incarnate Word +^	6	–	2	6	–	5
Lamar ^	6	–	3	7	–	5
Abilene Christian	5	–	4	6	–	5
Central Arkansas	5	–	4	6	–	5
McNeese State	5	–	4	6	–	5
Sam Houston State	5	–	4	6	–	5
Northwestern State	4	–	5	5	–	6
Southeastern Louisiana	4	–	5	4	–	7
Stephen F. Austin	2	–	7	2	–	8
Houston Baptist	0	–	9	1	–	10
+ – Conference co-champions; ^ – FCS playoff participant; Rankings from STATS poll

The 2018 Nicholls State Colonels football team represented Nicholls State University as a member of the Southland Conference during the 2018 NCAA Division I FCS football season. Led by fourth-year head coach Tim Rebowe, the Colonels compiled an overall record of 9–4 with a mark of 7–2 in conference play, sharing the Southland title with Incarnate Word. Nicholls State received the Southland's automatic bid to the NCAA Division I Football Championship, beating San Diego in the first round before losing to Eastern Washington in the second round. The team played home games at John L. Guidry Stadium in Thibodaux, Louisiana.

== Preseason ==
=== Preseason All-Conference Teams ===
On July 12, 2018, the Southland announced their Preseason All-Conference Teams, with the Colonels having a conference leading 14 players selected.

Offense first team

- Chase Fourcade – Jr. QB
- Damion Jeanpiere – Sr. WR
- Ryan Hanley – Sr. OL
- Chandler Arceneaux – Sr. OL

Defense first team

- Sully Laiche – Jr. DL
- Kenny Dotson – Sr. DL
- Allen Pittman – Jr. LB
- Hezekiah White – Sr. LB
- Corey Abraham – Sr. DB
- Ahmani Martin – Sr. DB
Offense second team
- Kyran Irvin – Jr. RB
- Dai'Jean Dixon – Sr. WR
- Eddie Houston – Sr. OL
- Lorran Fonseca – Sr. P

=== Preseason poll ===
On July 19, 2018, the Southland announced their preseason poll, with the Colonels predicted to finish in second place.

== Roster ==
2018 Nicholls Colonels football team roster
Players
Coaches
Offense

Pos.	#	Name	Class
RB	1	Dontrell Taylor	Jr
RB	2	Kendall Bussey	Jr
WR	3	Damion Jeanpiere Jr.	Sr
WR	5	Dai'Jean Dixon	So
WR	6	Gabe Fuselier	Sr
WR	7	Christian Booker	Jr
QB	9	Chase Fourcade	Jr
QB	10	Charles Brooks	Jr
WR	13	Mason Roberts	Sr
WR	14	Arron McKenney	So
QB	15	Kohen Granier	Fr
QB	16	Nick Conley	Sr
TE	18	Jordan Talley	Jr
RB	22	Jeremy Rounds	Jr
WR	24	Cedric Williams	Fr
WR	25	Damontrion Brunson	Fr
WR	26	Tahj Smith	So
RB	27	Devin Briscoe	Fr
RB	28	Julien Gums	Fr
RB	30	Kyran Irvin	Jr
RB	32	Mason Boudreaux	Sr
WR	33	Stefano Guarisco	Jr
RB	37	Bailey Badeaux	So
WR	39	Alek Domangue	Fr
TE	40	Garret LeBlanc	Jr
RB	42	Brennan Rogers	Fr
TE	44	Codi Willis	Fr
OL	57	Sam Gruenig	Jr
OL	60	Demetrius Gleaton	Sr
OL	61	Jeremiah James	Fr
OL	62	Zach Trahan	Fr
OL	63	Ryan Hanley	Sr
OL	64	Alex Anderson	Sr
OL	65	Chad Cheramie	Fr
OL	67	Cameron Maheu	Fr
OL	69	Hunter Austin	Jr
OL	70	Eddie Houston	Sr
OL	71	Chandler Arceneaux	Sr
OL	72	Tyrin Arceneaux	Jr
OL	73	Jair Joseph	So
OL	74	Bradston Burnside	Jr
OL	75	Charlton Arceneaux	So
OL	77	Ja'Cobey Lee	Fr
OL	78	Jacob Martin	Fr
OL	79	P. J. Burkhalteer	So
TE	80	Morell Bartholomew	Jr
WR	81	David Robinson Jr.	Fr
WR	82	Miguel Harris	Sr
WR	83	Darrion Cook	Jr
WR	84	Bryson Simmons	Jr
WR	85	Dontaze Costly	Fr
TE	86	Cameron Carrier	So
WR	87	Chris Raymond	Fr
TE	88	David Mosley	So
TE	89	Bry'Kiethon Mouton	Sr

Defense

Pos.	#	Name	Class
DB	4	Darryl Adams Jr.	Sr
DB	8	Alonzo Craighton	Sr
LB	11	Aquindas Steib	So
DB	12	Joel Dullary	Sr
DB	15	Anfernee Poindexter	So
DB	17	Lloyd Nash	Fr
DB	19	Jerrion Burton	Sr
LB	20	Mikey Corcoran	Jr
DB	21	Jamal Walter	Fr
LB	23	Korey Louis	So
DB	24	Darren Evans	So
LB	25	Laryon James	Jr
DB	26	Christopher Boutte	Fr
DB	27	Jonavon Lewis	Sr
DB	29	Chase Brown	Fr
DB	30	Kairon Brooks	Jr
DB	31	Corey Abraham	Sr
DB	34	Kristian Mims	Jr
LB	35	Donnell Adair	So
DB	36	B. J. Randale Jr.	Fr
DB	38	Kevin Johnson	So
LB	39	Adrian Richardson	Sr
DB	40	Jarvais Robinson	So
DB	41	Grid Isidore Jr.	Fr
DB	42	Rejean Wright	Fr
DL	43	Patrick Riley	Jr
DB	44	Ahmani Martin	Sr
DB	45	Austin Dickerson	Jr
DB	46	Chris Duplantis	So
LB	47	Allen Pittman	Jr
LB	48	Evan Veron	Jr
DL	50	Emanuel Dayries	Sr
LB	51	Michael Mosley	Jr
LB	52	Dellary Oubre	Fr
LB	54	Moroni Pointer	Sr
DL	55	Sully Laiche	Jr
LB	57	Aaron Buckwalter	Fr
LB	58	Hezekiah White	Sr
DL	59	Jeremy Hudson	Fr
DL	70	Zach Gremillion	Fr
DL	76	Al Wilson	Jr
DL	87	Kris Lewis	Sr
DL	89	Devin Edinburgh	So
DL	90	Tyler Johnson	Sr
DL	91	Xavier Anderson	So
DL	92	Danquan Edwards	Fr
DL	93	Ronald Ollie	Sr
DL	94	Brandon Fontenot	Jr
DL	95	Devin Simoneaux	Sr
DL	96	Glen Thurmond	Fr
DL	97	Kenny Dotson	Sr

Special teams

Pos.	#	Name	Class
P	22	Matthew Alfonso	Fr
K	37	Bray Dunsenbery	Fr
K	49	Lorran Fonseca	Sr
LS	53	Dominic Brocato	Fr
LS	54	Andrea Dragna	Fr
LS	59	Wesley Barnett	Sr
LS	60	Jalen Himel	Fr
P	99	Winston Jones	Jr

Head coach

- Tim Rebowe (LSU)

Coordinators/assistant coaches

- Rob Christophel (Austin Peay)
  Offensive coordinator
- Tommy Rybacki (Jacksonville State)
  Defensive coordinator
- Russ Gisclair (Nicholls State)
  Tight ends
- Sammy Joseph (LSU)
  Running backs
- Sean Murphy (Millsaps)
  Wide receivers
- Lee Roussel (Southeastern Louisiana)
  Defensive line
- Chris Thompson (Nicholls State)
  Cornerbacks
- Brian Wallace (Louisiana College)
  Safeties

Legend

- (C) Team captain
- (S) Suspended
- (I) Ineligible
- Injured
- Redshirt

Roster
Last update: May 1, 2019

== Schedule ==
Date	Time	Opponent	Rank	Site	TV	Result	Attendance
September 1	6:00 p.m.	at Kansas*	No. 18	David Booth Kansas Memorial Stadium; Lawrence, KS	ESPN+	W 26–23 ^{OT}	24,305
September 8	7:00 p.m.	at Tulane*	No. 11	Yulman Stadium; New Orleans, LA	ESPN3	L 17–42	21,092
September 15	6:00 p.m.	at No. 16 McNeese State	No. 13	Cowboy Stadium; Lake Charles, LA	CST	L 10–20	13,140
September 22	3:00 p.m.	No. 11 Sam Houston State	No. 18	John L. Guidry Stadium; Thibodaux, LA	ESPN+	W 27–7	5,025
September 29	3:00 p.m.	Lamar	No. 15	John L. Guidry Stadium; Thibodaux, LA	ELVN/CST	W 50–27	8,044
October 6	6:30 p.m.	at Northwestern State	No. 12	Harry Turpin Stadium; Natchitoches, LA (NSU Challenge)	CST	W 28–10	7,055
October 13	2:30 p.m.	at Abilene Christian	No. 11	Wildcat Stadium; Abilene, TX	ESPN3	L 12–28	10,973
October 27	3:00 p.m.	Incarnate Word^{†}	No. 20	John L. Guidry Stadium; Thibodaux, LA	SLC Digital	W 48–21	8,061
November 3	2:00 p.m.	at Houston Baptist	No. 20	Husky Stadium; Houston, TX	SLC Digital	W 41–20	1,926
November 10	3:00 p.m.	Stephen F. Austin	No. 17	John L. Guidry Stadium; Thibodaux, LA	CST/ESPN3	W 47–14	7,025
November 15	6:00 p.m.	Southeastern Louisiana	No. 18	John L. Guidry Stadium; Thibodaux, LA (River Bell Classic)	CST/ESPN3	W 44–0	9,454
November 24	3:00 p.m.	No. 19 San Diego*	No. 14	John L. Guidry Stadium; Thibodaux, LA (NCAA Division I First Round)	ESPN3	W 49–30	8,571
December 1	2:00 p.m.	at No. 4 Eastern Washington*	No. 14	Roos Field; Cheney, WA (NCAA Division I Second Round)	ESPN3	L 21–42	5,250
*Non-conference game; ^{†}Homecoming; Rankings from STATS Poll released prior to the game; All times are in Central time

== Game summaries ==
=== At Kansas ===
Nicholls at Kansas – Game summary

Quarter	1	2	3	4	OT	Total
Colonels	7	3	7	3	6	26
Jayhawks	7	3	0	10	3	23

at David Booth Kansas Memorial Stadium, Lawrence, KS

- Date: September 1
- Game time: 6:00 p.m. CST
- Game weather: 90 °F (32 °C); clear
- Game attendance: 24,305
- Referee: Mike Cuttone
- TV: ESPN+

Game information

First quarter

- NICH - Dontrell Taylor 15-yard TD run, Lorran Fonseca kick good, 10:29 (NICH 7-0)
- KU - Steven Sims Jr. 2-yard TD pass from Peyton Bender, Gabriel Rui kick good, 3:34 (TIE 7-7)

Second quarter

- KU - Rui 54-yard field goal, 13:00 (KU 10-7)
- NICH - Fonseca 28-yard field goal, 4:06 (TIE 10-10)

Third quarter

- NICH - Kendall Bussey 40-yard TD run, Fonseca kick good, 3:50 (NICH 17-10)

Fourth quarter

- KU - Team safety, 13:17 (NICH 17-12)
- KU - Kerr Johnson Jr. 15-yard TD pass from Bender, Sims Jr. two-point conversion pass to Marvin Saunders good, 4:26 (KU 20-17)
- NICH - Fonseca 43-yard field goal, 0:47 (TIE 20-20)

First overtime

- KU - Rui 41-yard field goal, (KU 23-20)
- NICH - Chase Fourcade 4-yard TD run, (NICH 26-23)

Top passers

- NICH - Chase Fourcade - 12/24, 142 yards
- KU - Peyton Bender - 19/35, 187 yards, 2 TD

Top rushers

- NICH - Kendall Bussey - 28 carries, 123 yards, TD
- KU - Khalil Herbert - 12 carries, 61 yards

Top receivers

- NICH - Damion Jeanpiere Jr. - 2 receptions, 67 yards
- KU - Kerr Johnson Jr. - 3 receptions, 54 yards, TD

=== At Tulane ===
Nicholls at Tulane – Game summary

Quarter	1	2	3	4	Total
No. 10 (FCS) Colonels	3	7	0	7	17
Green Wave	7	14	7	14	42

at Yulman Stadium, New Orleans, LA

- Date: September 8
- Game time: 7:00 p.m. CST
- Game weather: 83 °F (28 °C); cloudy
- Game attendance: 21,092
- Referee: Henry Wimberg
- TV: ESPN3

Game information

First quarter

- TULN - Corey Dauphine 38-yard TD run, Merek Glover kick good, 6:12 (TULN 7-0)
- NICH - Lorran Fonseca 21-yard field goal, 0:07 (TULN 7-3)

Second quarter

- TULN - Dauphine 69-yard TD run, Glover kick good, 14:46 (TULN 14-3)
- TULN - Jonathan Banks 5-yard TD run, Glover kick good, 8:46 (TULN 21-3)
- NICH - Gabe Fuselier 7-yard TD pass from Chase Fourcade, Fonseca kick good, 0:23 (TULN 21-10)

Third quarter

- TULN - Darnell Mooney 12-yard TD pass from Banks, Glover kick good, 0:50 (TULN 28-10)

Fourth quarter

- NICH - Dontrell Taylor 32-yard TD run, Fonseca kick good, 12:47 (TULN 28-17)
- TULN - Dauphine 35-yard TD run, Glover kick good, 8:47 (TULN 35-17)
- TULN - Amare Jones 1-yard TD run, Glover kick good, 2:00 (TULN 42-17)

Top passers

- TULN - Jonathan Banks - 12/16, 190 yards, TD
- NICH - Chase Fourcade - 17/31, 239 yards, TD, 2 INT

Top rushers

- TULN - Corey Dauphine - 6 carries, 152 yards, 3 TD
- NICH - Chase Fourcade - 14 carries, 53 yards

Top receivers

- TULN - Darnell Mooney - 6 receptions, 111 yards, TD
- NICH - Dai'Jean Dixon - 4 receptions, 112 yards

=== At McNeese State ===
Nicholls at McNeese State – Game summary

Quarter	1	2	3	4	Total
No. 12 Colonels	0	3	0	7	10
No. 15 Cowboys	7	7	3	3	20

at Cowboy Stadium, Lake Charles, LA

- Date: September 15
- Game time: 6:00 p.m. CST
- Game weather: 81 °F (27 °C); overcast
- Game attendance: 13,140
- Referee: Vidal Jones
- TV: CST

Game information

First quarter

- MCNS - Lawayne Ross 16-yard TD pass from James Tabary, Gunnar Raborn kick good, 14:50 (MCNS 7-0)

Second quarter

- MCNS - Cyron Sutton 11-yard TD pass from Tabary, Raborn kick good, 12:37 (MCNS 14-0)
- NICH - Lorran Fonseca 21-yard field goal, 3:08 (MCNS 14-3)

Third quarter

- MCNS - Raborn 24-yard field goal, 8:11 (MCNS 17-3)

Fourth quarter

- MCNS - Raborn 42-yard field goal, 11:53 (MCNS 20-3)
- NICH - Dai'Jean Dixon 2-yard TD pass from Chase Fourcade, Fonseca kick good, 0:06 (MCNS 20-10)

Top passers

- MCNS - James Tabary - 14/19, 133 yards, 2 TD
- NICH - Chase Fourcade - 22/41, 257 yards, TD

Top rushers

- MCNS - Justin Pratt - 11 carries, 45 yards
- NICH - Chase Fourcade - 14 carries, 45 yards

Top receivers

- MCNS - Cyron Sutton - 5 receptions, 56 yards, TD
- NICH - Damion Jeanpiere Jr. - 4 receptions, 100 yards

=== Sam Houston State ===
Sam Houston State at Nicholls – Game summary

Quarter	1	2	3	4	Total
Bearkats	7	0	0	0	7
No. 11 Colonels	3	7	3	14	27

at Manning Field at John L. Guidry Stadium, Thibodaux, LA

- Date: September 22
- Game time: 3:00 p.m. CST
- Game weather: 82 °F (28 °C); rainy, overcast
- Game attendance: 5,025
- Referee: Michael VanderVelde
- TV: ESPN+

Game information

First quarter

- NICH - Lorran Fonseca 35-yard field goal, 6:17 (NICH 3-0)
- SHSU - Davion Davis 19-yard TD pass from Mike Dare, Tre Honshtein kick good, 1:41 (SHSU 7-3)

Second quarter

- NICH - Damion Jeanpiere Jr. 12-yard TD pass from Chase Fourcade, Fonseca kick good, 3:20 (NICH 10-7)

Third quarter

- NICH - Fonseca 22-yard field goal, 8:07 (NICH 13-7)

Fourth quarter

- NICH - Dontrell Taylor 6-yard TD run, Fonseca kick good, 4:04 (NICH 20-7)
- NICH - Kendall Bussey 2-yard TD run, Fonseca kick good, 2:55 (NICH 27-7)

Top passers

- NICH - Chase Fourcade - 15/23, 197 yards, TD
- SHSU - Mike Dare - 18/24, 214 yards, TD, 2 INT

Top rushers

- NICH - Kyran Irvin - 14 carries, 73 yards
- SHSU - Remus Bulmer - 8 carries, 29 yards

Top receivers

- NICH - Dai'Jean Dixon - 3 receptions, 62 yards
- SHSU - Nathan Stewart - 8 receptions, 113 yards

=== Lamar ===
Lamar at Nicholls – Game summary

Quarter	1	2	3	4	Total
Cardinals	10	7	3	7	27
No. 15 Colonels	13	14	14	9	50

at Manning Field at John L. Guidry Stadium, Thibodaux, LA

- Date: September 29
- Game time: 2:30 p.m. CST
- Game weather: 82 °F (28 °C); rainy, cloudy
- Game attendance: 8,044
- Referee: Dan Lewis
- TV: CST/Eleven Sports

Game information

First quarter

- NICH - Austin Dickerson 26-yard interception returned for TD, Lorran Fonseca kick good, 11:23 (NICH 7-0)
- LAM - Elvin Martinez 47-yard field goal, 7:50 (NICH 7-3)
- LAM - Darrel Colbert Jr. 1-yard TD run, Martinez kick good, 3:44 (LAM 10-7)
- NICH - Chase Fourcade 4-yard TD run, Fonseca kick no good, 1:17 (NICH 13-10)

Second quarter

- LAM - Mason Sikes 44-yard TD pass from Colbert Jr., Martinez kick good, 9:37 (LAM 17-13)
- NICH - Dai'Jean Dixon 10-yard TD pass from Fourcade, Fonseca kick good, 7:22 (NICH 20-17)
- NICH - Julien Gums 68-yard TD run, Fonseca kick good, 4:07 (NICH 27-17)

Third quarter

- LAM - Martinez 48-yard field goal, 10:34 (NICH 27-20)
- NICH - Kyran Irvin 36-yard TD pass from Fourcade, Fonseca kick good, 6:52 (NICH 34-20)
- NICH - Dontaze Costly 41-yard TD pass from Fourcade, Fonseca kick good, 2:49 (NICH 41-20)

Fourth quarter

- NICH - Fourcade 12-yard TD run, Fonseca kick no good, 14:53 (NICH 47-20)
- NICH - Fonseca 25-yard field goal, 4:53 (NICH 50-20)
- LAM - Jordan Hoy 8-yard TD run, Martinez kick good, 2:14 (NICH 50-27)

Top passers

- NICH - Chase Fourcade - 12/24, 299 yards, 3 TD, 2 INT
- LAM - Darrel Colbert Jr. - 10/20, 159 yards, TD, 2 INT

Top rushers

- NICH - Jalen Gums - 10 carries, 152 yards, TD
- LAM - A. J. Walker - 12 carries, 77 yards

Top receivers

- NICH - Stefano Guarisco - 3 receptions, 110 yards
- LAM - Mason Sikes - reception, 44 yards, TD

=== At Northwestern State ===
Nicholls at Northwestern State – Game summary

Quarter	1	2	3	4	Total
No. 12 Colonels	0	14	7	7	28
Demons	3	7	0	0	10

at Harry Turpin Stadium, Natchitoches, LA

- Date: October 6
- Game time: 6:00 p.m. CST
- Game weather: 77 °F (25 °C); cloudy and clearing
- Game attendance: 7,055
- Referee: David Alvarez
- TV: CST

Game information

First quarter

- NSU - Austyn Fendrick 28-yard field goal, 13:39 (NSU 3-0)

Second quarter

- NICH - Dai'Jean Dixon 5-yard TD pass from Chase Fourcade, Lorran Fonseca kick good, 14:16 (NICH 7-3)
- NSU - Stadford Anderson 12-yard TD run, Fendrick kick good, 10:28 (NSU 10-7)
- NICH - Fourcade 3-yard TD run, Fonseca kick good, 5:01 (NICH 14-10)

Third quarter

- NICH - Kendall Bussey 1-yard TD run, Fonseca kick good, 12:35 (NICH 21-10)

Fourth quarter

- NICH - Jalen Gums 2-yard TD run, Fonseca kick good, 1:42 (NICH 28-10)

Top passers

- NICH - Chase Fourcade - 8/17, 118 yards, TD, INT
- NSU - Shelton Eppler - 16/27, 218 yards, 2 INT

Top rushers

- NICH - Dontrell Taylor - 11 carries, 103 yards
- NSU - Jared West - 14 carries, 57 yards

Top receivers

- NICH - Damion Jeanpiere Jr. - 2 receptions, 60 yards
- NSU - Jaylen Watson - 4 receptions, 72 yards

=== At Abilene Christian ===
Nicholls at Abilene Christian – Game summary

Quarter	1	2	3	4	Total
No. 11 Colonels	6	6	0	0	12
Wildcats	7	14	0	7	28

at Anthony Field at Wildcat Stadium, Abilene, TX

- Date: October 13
- Game time: 2:30 p.m. CST
- Game weather: 60 °F (16 °C); overcast, rainy
- Game attendance: 10,973
- Referee: Dan Lewis

Game information

First quarter

- ACU - Luke Anthony 1-yard TD run, Oscar Hernandez kick good, 10:55 (ACU 7-0)
- NICH - Lorran Fonseca 35-yard field goal, 7:04 (ACU 7-3)
- NICH - Fonseca 25-yard field goal, 3:01 (ACU 7-6)

Second quarter

- ACU - Kalin Sadler 65-yard TD pass from Anthony, Hernandez kick good, 11:18 (ACU 14-6)
- ACU - Billy McCrary 42-yard TD run, Hernandez kick good, 5:44 (ACU 21-6)
- NICH - Dai'Jean Dixon 21-yard TD pass from Chase Fourcade, Fonseca kick no good, 1:10 (ACU 21-12)

Fourth quarter

- ACU - Josh Fink 16-yard TD pass from Anthony, Hernandez kick good, 7:59 (ACU 28-12)

Top passers

- ACU - Luke Anthony - 20/33, 209 yards, 2 TD
- NICH - Chase Fourcade - 27/46, 261 yards, TD

Top rushers

- ACU - Billy McCrary - 15 carries, 91 yards, TD
- NICH - Dontrell Taylor - 14 carries, 86 yards

Top receivers

- ACU - Kalin Sadler - 2 receptions, 71 yards, TD
- NICH - Dai'Jean Dixon - 7 receptions, 110 yards, TD

=== Incarnate Word ===
Incarnate Word at Nicholls – Game summary

Quarter	1	2	3	4	Total
Cardinals	7	0	7	7	21
No. 20 Colonels	21	17	7	3	48

at Manning Field at John L. Guidry Stadium, Thibodaux, LA

- Date: October 27
- Game time: 3:00 p.m. CST
- Game weather: 71 °F (22 °C); sunny and clear
- Game attendance: 8,061
- Referee: Cal McNeill

Game information

First quarter

- NICH - Dontrell Taylor 66-yard TD run, Lorran Fonseca kick good, 14:41 (NICH 7-0)
- NICH - Jordan Talley 6-yard TD pass from Chase Fourcade, Fonseca kick good, 5:31 (NICH 14-0)
- NICH - Talley 8-yard TD pass from Fourcade, Fonseca kick good, 3:41 (NICH 21-0)
- UIW - Philip Baptiste 2-yard TD pass from Jon Copeland, Cody Seidel kick good, 0:59 (NICH 21-7)

Second quarter

- NICH - Gabe Fuselier 42-yard TD pass from Fourcade, Fonseca kick good, 13:51 (NICH 28-7)
- NICH - Fonseca 29-yard field goal, 3:26 (NICH 31-7)
- NICH - Fourcade 10-yard TD run, Fonseca kick good, 1:08 (NICH 38-7)

Third quarter

- NICH - Damion Jeanpiere Jr. 48-yard TD pass from Fourcade, Fonseca kick good, 8:33 (NICH 45-7)
- UIW - Jaelin Campbell 0-yard fumble returned for TD, Seidel kick good, 4:54 (NICH 45-14)

Fourth quarter

- NICH - Fonseca 25-yard field goal, 7:12 (NICH 48-14)
- UIW - Campbell 9-yard TD pass from Copeland, Rhett Marshall kick good, 3:02 (NICH 48-21)

Top passers

- NICH - Chase Fourcade - 15/18, 266 yards, 4 TD, INT
- UIW - Jon Copeland - 32/47, 392 yards, 3 TD

Top rushers

- NICH - Dontrell Taylor - 6 carries, 117 yards, TD
- UIW - Ameer King - 12 carries, 55 yards

Top receivers

- NICH - Damion Jeanpiere Jr. - 3 receptions, 127 yards, TD
- UIW - Ameer King - 6 receptions, 88 yards

=== At Houston Baptist ===
Nicholls at Houston Baptist – Game summary

Quarter	1	2	3	4	Total
No. 20 Colonels	10	17	14	0	41
Huskies	0	0	7	13	20

at Husky Stadium, Houston, TX

- Date: November 3
- Game time: 2:00 p.m. CST
- Game weather: 75 °F (24 °C); sunny, scattered clouds
- Game attendance: 1,926
- Referee: Ed Bourgeois

Game information

First quarter

- NICH - Lorran Fonseca 56-yard field goal, 10:18 (NICH 3-0)
- NICH - Kendall Bussey 4-yard TD run, Fonseca kick good, 6:17 (NICH 10-0)

Second quarter

- NICH - Dontrell Taylor 13-yard TD pass from Chase Fourcade, Fonseca kick good, 11:04 (NICH 17-0)
- NICH - Fonseca 35-yard field goal, 6:32 (NICH 20-0)
- NICH - Dai'Jean Dixon 2-yard TD pass from Fourcade, Fonseca kick good, 0:14 (NICH 27-0)

Third quarter

- NICH - Fourcade 6-yard TD run, Fonseca kick good, 10:44 (NICH 34-0)
- HBU - Terry Tillmon 67-yard TD pass from Bailey Zappe, David Dominguez kick good, 9:36 (NICH 34-7)
- NICH - Fourcade 1-yard TD run, Fonseca kick good, 0:30 (NICH 41-7)

Fourth quarter

- HBU - Jack Blanco 40-yard blocked punt returned for TD, Dominguez kick good, 6:57 (NICH 41-14)
- HBU - Jarreth Sterns 1-yard TD run, Dominguez kick no good, 2:03 (NICH 41-20)

Top passers

- NICH - Chase Fourcade - 24/30, 279 yards, 2 TD
- HBU - Bailey Zappe - 22/38, 258 yards, TD

Top rushers

- NICH - Dontrell Taylor - 9 carries, 104 yards
- HBU - Ean Beek - 2 carries, 12 yards

Top receivers

- NICH - Damion Jeanpiere Jr. - 7 receptions, 96 yards
- HBU - Terry Tillmon - 2 receptions, 80 yards, TD

=== Stephen F. Austin ===
Stephen F. Austin at Nicholls – Game summary

Quarter	1	2	3	4	Total
Lumberjacks	0	0	7	7	14
No. 16 Colonels	14	10	13	10	47

at Manning Field at John L. Guidry Stadium, Thibodaux, LA

- Date: November 10
- Game time: 3:00 p.m. CST
- Game weather: 56 °F (13 °C); sunny and clear
- Game attendance: 7,025
- Referee: Dan Lewis
- TV: CST

Game information

First quarter

- NICH - Dai'Jean Dixon 11-yard TD pass from Chase Fourcade, Lorran Fonseca kick good, 13:10 (NICH 7-0)
- NICH - Dixon 38-yard TD pass from Fourcade, Fonseca kick good, 4:52 (NICH 14-0)

Second quarter

- NICH - Gabe Fuselier 7-yard TD pass from Fourcade, Fonseca kick good, 7:33 (NICH 21-0)
- NICH - Fonseca 22-yard field goal, 0:00 (NICH 24-0)

Third quarter

- SFA - Tamrick Pace 2-yard TD pass from Jake Blumrick, Storm Ruiz kick good, 12:15 (NICH 24-7)
- NICH - Dontrell Taylor 2-yard TD run, Fonseca kick good, 10:12 (NICH 31-7)
- NICH - Julien Gums 4-yard TD run, Fonseca kick no good, 0:41 (NICH 37-7)

Fourth quarter

- SFA - Terian Goree 2-yard TD pass from Foster Sawyer, Ruiz kick good, 13:30 (NICH 37-14)
- NICH - Kendall Bussey 48-yard TD pass from Fourcade, Fonseca kick good, 10:42 (NICH 44-14)
- NICH - Fonseca 26-yard field goal, 5:03 (NICH 47-14)

Top passers

- NICH - Chase Fourcade - 13/19, 261 yards, 4 TD
- SFA - Jake Blumrick - 16/25, 132 yards, TD, 2 INT

Top rushers

- NICH - Dontrell Taylor - 13 carries, 77 yards, TD
- SFA - Dominic Williams - 7 carries, 56 yards

Top receivers

- NICH - Dai'Jean Dixon - 5 receptions, 98 yards, 2 TD
- SFA - Tamrick Pace - 7 receptions, 75 yards, TD

=== Southeastern Louisiana ===
Southeastern Louisiana at Nicholls – Game summary

Quarter	1	2	3	4	Total
Lions	0	0	0	0	0
No. 15 Colonels	13	10	7	14	44

at Manning Field at John L. Guidry Stadium, Thibodaux, LA

- Date: November 15
- Game time: 6:00 p.m. CST
- Game weather: 48 °F (9 °C); clear
- Game attendance: 9,454
- Referee: Kevin Boitman
- TV: CST

Game information

First quarter

- NICH - Dontrell Taylor 14-yard TD run, Lorran Fonseca kick good, 13:58 (NICH 7-0)
- NICH - Julien Gums 2-yard TD run, Fonseca kick no good, 0:08 (NICH 14-0)

Second quarter

- NICH - Chase Fourcade 9-yard TD run, Fonseca kick good, 12:18 (NICH 21-0)
- NICH - Fonseca 23-yard field goal, 7:49 (NICH 24-0)

Third quarter

- NICH - Gabe Fuselier 10-yard TD pass from Fourcade, Fonseca kick good, 10:20 (NICH 30-0)

Fourth quarter

- NICH - Fourcade 1-yard TD run, Fonseca kick good, 14:55 (NICH 37-0)
- NICH - Gums 10-yard TD run, Fonseca kick good, 5:05 (NICH 44-0)

Top passers

- NICH - Chase Fourcade - 11/18, 128 yards, TD
- SELA - Chason Virgil - 16/31, 193 yards, INT

Top rushers

- NICH - Julien Gums - 14 carries, 121 yards, 2 TD
- SELA - Darren Johnson - 10 carries, 42 yards

Top receivers

- NICH - Dai'Jean Dixon - 4 receptions, 58 yards
- SELA - Bransen Schwebel - 3 receptions, 51 yards

=== San Diego–NCAA Division I First Round ===
San Diego at Nicholls – Game summary

Quarter	1	2	3	4	Total
No. 18 Toreros	7	3	13	7	30
No. 13 Colonels	21	14	7	7	49

at Manning Field at John L. Guidry Stadium, Thibodaux, LA

- Date: November 24
- Game time: 3:00 p.m. CST
- Game weather: 74 °F (23 °C); overcast
- Game attendance: 8,571
- Referee: Kelly Holman

Game information

First quarter

- NICH - Dontrell Taylor 27-yard TD run, Lorran Fonseca kick good, 10:59 (NICH 7-0)
- USD - Dlaton Kincaid 10-yard TD pass from Anthony Lawrence, Aedan Johnson kick good, 8:00 (TIE 7-7)
- NICH - Taylor 49-yard TD run, Fonseca kick good, 7:17 (NICH 14-7)
- NICH - Chase Fourcade 19-yard TD run, Fonseca kick good, 4:26 (NICH 21-7)

Second quarter

- USD - Johnson 32-yard field goal, 13:31 (NICH 21-10)
- NICH - Julien Gums 1-yard TD run, Fonseca kick good, 6:58 (NICH 28-10)
- NICH - Tahj Smith 52-yard TD pass from Fourcade, Fonseca kick good, 4:25 (NICH 35-10)

Third quarter

- NICH - Damion Jeanpiere Jr. 17-yard TD pass from Fourcade, Fonseca kick good, 9:59 (NICH 42-10)
- USD - Kincaid 38-yard TD pass from Lawrence, Johnson kick good, 7:51 (NICH 42-17)
- USD - Kincaid 8-yard TD pass from Lawrence, Johnson kick no good, 4:50 (NICH 42-32)

Fourth quarter

- USD - Kincaid 17-yard TD pass from Lawrence, Johnson kick good, 14:50 (NICH 42-30)
- NICH - Fourcade 13-yard TD run, Fonseca kick good, 8:53 (NICH 49-30)

Top passers

- NICH - Chase Fourcade - 21/31, 337 yards, 2 TD, INT
- USD - Anthony Lawrence - 30/56, 322 yards, 4 TD

Top rushers

- NICH - Dontrell Taylor - 14 carries, 124 yards, 2 TD
- USD - Emilio Martinez - 6 carries, 8 yards

Top receivers

- NICH - Damion Jeanpiere Jr. - 7 receptions, 143 yards, TD
- USD - Michael Bandy - 9 receptions, 144 yards

=== At Eastern Washington–NCAA Division I Second Round ===
Nicholls at Eastern Washington – Game summary

Quarter	1	2	3	4	Total
No. 14 Colonels	7	7	0	7	21
No. 4 Eagles	3	7	10	22	42

at Roos Field, Cheney, WA

- Date: December 1
- Game time: 4:00 p.m. CST
- Game weather: 37 °F (3 °C); mostly cloudy
- Game attendance: 5,250
- Referee: Tony Marcella

Game information

First quarter

- NICH - Chase Fourcade 1-yard TD run, Lorran Fonseca kick good, 10:02 (NICH 7-0)
- EWU - Roldan Alcobendas 22-yard field goal, 1:59 (NICH 7-3)

Second quarter

- NICH - Dontrell Taylor 3-yard TD run, Fonseca kick good, 13:11 (NICH 14-3)
- EWU - Kedrick Johnson 55-yard blocked field goal returned for TD, Alcobendas kick good, 0:00 (NICH 14-10)

Third quarter

- EWU - Andrew Boston 34-yard TD pass from Eric Barriere, Alcobendas kick good, 9:24 (EWU 17-14)
- EWU - Alcobendas 45-yard field goal, 3:52 (EWU 20-14)

Fourth quarter

- EWU - Sam McPherson 4-yard TD run, Barriere two-point conversion pass to Jayce Glider good, 10:05 (EWU 28-14)
- EWU - McPherson 34-yard TD run, Alcobendas kick good, 7:19 (EWU 35-14)
- EWU - Ketner Kupp 95-yard interception returned for TD, Alcobendas kick good, 3:34 (EWU 42-14)
- NICH - Fourcade 34-yard TD run, Fonseca kick good, 1:35 (EWU 42-21)

Top passers

- EWU - Eric Barriere - 17/29, 162 yards, TD, INT
- NICH - Chase Fourcade - 17/30, 146 yards, INT

Top rushers

- EWU - Sam McPherson - 20 carries, 137 yards, 2 TD
- NICH - Dontrell Taylor - 20 carries, 112 yards, TD

Top receivers

- EWU - Andrew Boston - 5 receptions, 89 yards, TD
- NICH - Dontrell Taylor - 5 receptions, 39 yards

== Ranking movements ==
Ranking movements Legend: ██ Increase in ranking ██ Decrease in ranking т = Tied with team above or below
	Week													
Poll	Pre	1	2	3	4	5	6	7	8	9	10	11	12	Final
STATS FCS	18	11	13	18	15	12	11	20	20	20	17	18	14	14
Coaches	17	10	12	18	15	12	11	22	19	20–T	16	15	14	14
