= 2016 Major League Football season =

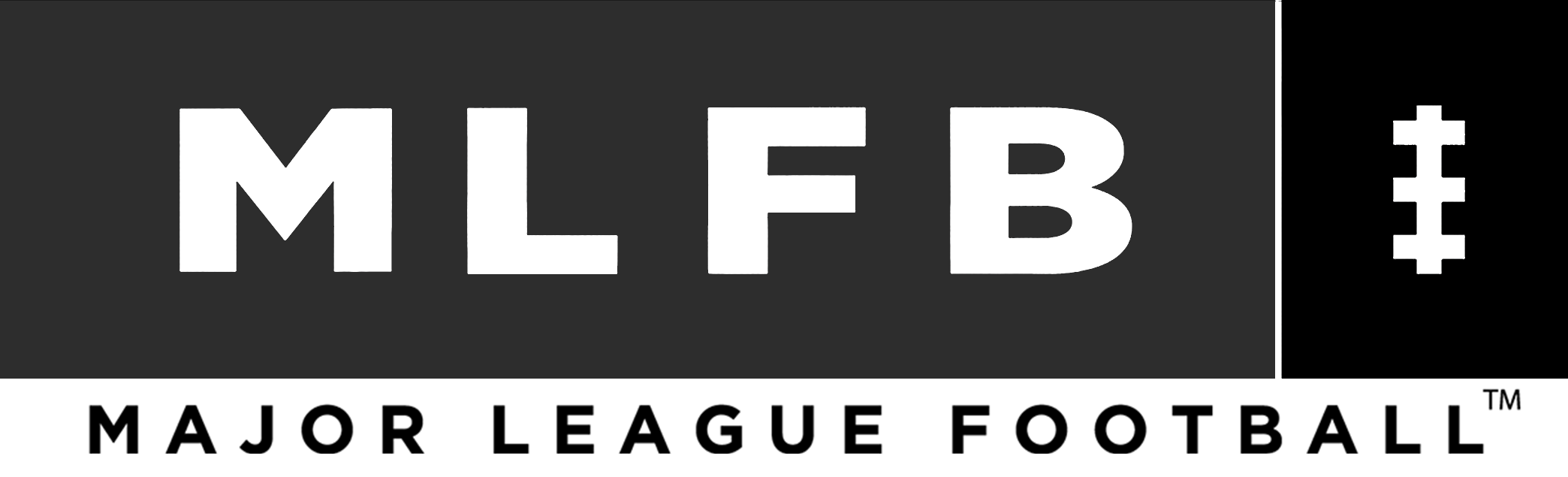
- League: Major League Football
- Sport: American football
- Duration: April–August (planned)
- Games: 40 regular-season games, 3 postseason games (planned)
- Teams: 8 (planned)
- TV partner: American Sports Network

Seasons
- ~~2022~~

The 2016 Major League Football season was the planned inaugural season of the Major League Football (MLFB), a public traded professional football league.

The season was cancelled after a major financial backer of the league backed out of a $20 million commitment.

== Background ==
MLFB originally planned on having its inaugural season in spring 2016. In January 2016, the MLFB held a draft for eight teams based on territory and announced seven general managers (Jerry Hardaway, Rodney Knox, Gerald Loper, Glenn Smith, Quintin Smith, Stephen Videtich and Martin Prince) and eight head coaches (Dave Campo, Charlie Collins, Ted Cottrell, Robert Ford, Wayne 'Buddy' Geis, Galen Hall, Larry Kirksey and Chris Miller).

However, in February 2016, a major financial backer of the league backed out of a $20 million commitment putting the league's first season in jeopardy. The league continued to push forward in an attempt to start games in April 2016, but was unable to come up with the needed financials in order to operate a full season. On March 31, the league announced that the first season would be postponed and 2016 would be considered a "developmental" year. But the league would miss at least four months of rent payments on its headquarters in Lakewood Ranch, Florida, and eviction papers were served for non-payment of rent beginning in March 2016, ending any hope of starting the season.

== Teams ==
While never officially unannounced, the MLFB has filed trademarks for ten regional teams and have held a territorial draft for eight teams in which coaches draft based on region. The reported names were: Alabama Airborne (Birmingham), Arkansas Attack (Little Rock), Florida Fusion (Orlando), Utah Stand (Salt Lake City), Texas Independence (San Antonio), Oklahoma Nation (Oklahoma City), Ohio Union (Akron), and Northwest Empire (Eugene), while the league would add the Virginia Armada (Norfolk) and Oregon Crash (Portland) on a later date. The final The eight cities were supposed to be announced after Super Bowl 50.

The final potential teams were:

- Alabama Airborne
- Arkansas Attack
- Florida Fusion
- Northwest Empire
- Ohio Union
- Oklahoma Nation
- Oregon Crash
- Texas Independence
- Utah Stand
- Virginia Armada

== Coaches ==
The following coaches were part of the planned 2016 season:

- Dave Campo (Arkansas Attack)
- Charlie Collins (Utah Stand)
- Ted Cottrell (Alabama Airborne)
- Robert Ford (Texas Independence)
- Wayne 'Buddy' Geis (Oklahoma Nation)
- Galen Hall (Florida Fusion)
- Larry Kirksey (Ohio Union)
- Chris Miller (Oregon Crash)

== Players ==
On October 17, 2015, MLFB conducted the first league "Pro-days" simultaneously in Eugene, Oregon and Akron, Ohio, with additional tryouts on later dates in 14 cities. Every player who participated in the league tryouts had to pay $250 registration fee. Camps were supposed to start on March 30, 2016, at The Premier Sports Campus in Lakewood Ranch, Florida. Each team would've started the camp with 80 players on the roster and carried a 53-men roster to the regular season.

For the 2016 season, the players would've been paid $3,000 per win and $2,000 per loss (later reports said $3,500 and $2,500 respectively), while a designated "franchise player" on each team would've make $5,000 per week. All players were able to sign with other league at any point in the season, other than the last two weeks if their team was in the playoffs.

=== Draft ===
The 2016 MLFB Draft was the inaugural player selection process to fill the rosters of the eight teams of the planned 2016. "More than 2,000 players" were in the draft pool. The 70 rounds player allocation process was held in three phases: "Franchise player draft" (day 1), "Territorial" (day 2) and "National" (day 3). Also, each team was allowed to sign 10 "post draft free agents". As a result of not finalizing teams locations, all teams were received the name of the assigned coach ("Team Campo", "Team Cottrell" etc.).

==== Franchise player draft ====
The "Franchise player draft" was the first round of 70 for the Major League Football (MLFB) draft, held in advance of the planned 2016 season.

Rnd.	Pick #	Team	Player	Position	College
1	1	Team Campo	Joe Adams	WR/KR	Arkansas
1	2	Team Collins	Chris Bonner	QB	CSU-Pueblo
1	3	Team Cottrell	Taylor Belsterling	WR	Huntingdon
1	4	Team Ford	Casey Pachall	QB	TCU
1	5	Team Geis	Emmanuel Stephens	DE	Ole Miss
1	6	Team Hall	Stephen Garcia	QB	South Carolina
1	7	Team Kirksey	Dan LeFevour	QB	Central Michigan
1	8	Team Miller	Darron Thomas	QB	Oregon

== Season finances ==
On February 5, 2016, MLFB announced that Clairemont Private Investment Group, LLC had breached its agreement with the company to invest $20 million into the League. On February 17 the league claimed it signed a Letter of Intent to secured $120 Million in Equity and Credit Line Financing from Asian Global Capital, Ltd. The funding agreement was expected to include a $20 million equity purchase of MLFB common stock, a $100,000,000 line of credit. Nevertheless, by June 2016, the league would miss at least four months of rent payments on its headquarters in Lakewood Ranch, Florida, and eviction papers were served for non-payment of rent beginning in March 2016.

== Media ==
On January 12, 2016, MLFB announced a two-year television deal with the American Sports Network.
