= Arkansas Attack =

MLFB team based in Little Rock, Arkansas

Logo

General information
- Founded: 2022; 4 years ago
- Stadium: War Memorial Stadium
- Headquartered: Little Rock, Arkansas
- Website: www.mlfb.com/arkansas

Personnel
- Owners: Major League Football, Inc. (publicly traded company)
- Head coach: Earnest Wilson

League / conference affiliations
- Major League Football

The Arkansas Attack were a proposed professional American football team based in Little Rock, Arkansas that has never played a game. The team is a member of the Major League Football (MLFB), a public traded professional football league, and plays its home games at War Memorial Stadium.

The Attack are part of the league "Core Four" teams. They are the first pro football team in Little Rock, Arkansas since the Arkansas Diamonds, which played in the Continental Football League and later in the American Football Association. (In 1992, a team called the Arkansas Miners was set to call the War Memorial home in the proposed Professional Spring Football League, but the circuit folded without playing a game.)

== History ==
On March 18, 2022, Major League Football launched a new website and revealed that there will be only four teams for the first season. On May 6, after some delays and many candidates, MLFB hired their fourth coach for 2022 season Earnest Wilson, which was most recently the head coach at Defiance College. The league would later reveled he will coach the Arkansas Attack.

The Attack started their training camp on July 21. One week later, the team was evicted from its hotel amid unpaid bills and reports of the league shutting down.

== Staff ==
Arkansas Attack staff
Head coaches: Head coach and Offensive Coordinator – Earnest Wilson; Offensive coaches: Wide Receivers - Rodney Blackshear; Tight Ends/Running backs - Dale Carlson; Defensive coaches: Defensive Coordinator – Derrius Bell; Defensive Line - Bernard Holsey; Linebackers – Mike Fanoga

== Players ==
Arkansas Attack roster
Quarterbacks: 10 Ja'rome Johnson; 7 Jalen Jones; 3 Lukas O'Connor; Running backs: 48 LaDarius Galloway; 55 Bruce Jordan-Swilling; 79 Taylor Martin; 2 Raymond Taylor; 40 Matt Tuleja FB; Wide receivers: 83 Laquvionte Gonzalez; 19 Aakiel Greer; 84 Jamari Hester; 4 Ka'Ronce Higgins; 98 Marquis Lawson; 90 Justin Manyweather; 5 Michael Moss; 86 Keith Pearson; 16 Thomas Reid III; 15 Damon Sheehy-Guiseppi KR; 51 Patrick Smith Jr; 1 Jordus Smith; 82 Smith, Shavarez; 80 Darren Wood Jr.; Tight ends: 86 Bryson Cannon; 97 David Meza; 26 Ronquavion Tarver	Offensive linemen: 66 Louis Chandler OG; 73 Samuel Devril OT; 72 Issac Jackson OT; 75 Cameron Johnson OT; 74 Chanlder Jones OG; 13 Lawrence Keys C; 56 Somadina Okezie-Okeke C; 67 Jaden Salley OG; 77 Bruce Trigg OT; 62 Dwayne Wallace OG; Defensive linemen: 97 Michael Badejo DE; 68 Chris Biggurs DT; 91 Denzel Chukwukelu DT; 41 Deshon Cooper DT; 81 Armond Lloyd DT; 22 Ke'Tyrus Marks DT; 85 Jonathan McKinney DE; 99 Jamal Milan DT; 96 Gabe Richardson DE; 50 Nick Williams DT; 95 Sha'haun Williams DE	Linebackers: 54 Kyaire Bynum; 52 Cecil Cherry; 36 Jarod Fountain; 87 Stanley Gee; 30 Alexis Ramos; Defensive backs: 28 Isiah Bennett; 23 Dashawn Benton; 25 Brandon Brice; 43 Reginald Cole; 31 Curtis Collins; 34 JJ Dallas; 27 Alvin Davis; 32 Antwuan Davis; 39 Malik Davis; 32 Robert Dickerson III; 58 Cornelius Sturghill; 38 Elijah Walker; Special teams: 44 Erik Lawson LS; 9 Paul Ortiz K; 6 Jonathan Ward P	Injured reserve: Currently vacant; Practice squad: Currently vacant; Inactive: Currently vacant; Rookies in italics Roster updated July 24, 2022; 66 Active, 0 Inactive → More rosters
