= Ohio Force =

MLFB team based in Canton, Ohio

Logo

General information
- Founded: 2022; 4 years ago
- Stadium: Tom Benson Hall of Fame Stadium
- Headquartered: Canton, Ohio
- Website: www.mlfb.com/Ohio

Personnel
- Owners: Major League Football, Inc. (publicly traded company)
- Head coach: Bill Conley

League / conference affiliations
- Major League Football

The Ohio Force are a professional American football team based in Canton, Ohio. The team is a member of the Major League Football (MLFB), a public traded professional football league, and plays its home games at Tom Benson Hall of Fame Stadium.

The Force are part of the league "Core Four" teams. They are the first pro football team in Canton since the NFL former champions Canton Bulldogs.

== History ==
On March 18, 2022, Major League Football launched a new website and revealed that there will be only four teams for the first season. On March 30 former Ohio Dominican head coach and former Ohio State assistant, Bill Conley, was announced as the league third HC. The league would later reveled he will coach the Ohio Force.

The Force started their training camp on July 21. One week later, the team was evicted from its hotel amid unpaid bills and reports of the league shutting down.

== Staff ==
Ohio Force staff
Head coaches: Head coach and Defensive Coordinator – Bill Conley; Offensive coaches: Offensive Coordinator/Offensive Line - Mitch Browning; Quarterbacks/Wide Receivers - Morris Watts; Running Backs - Reggie Mitchell; Defensive coaches: Defensive Line - Winfield Garnett; Linebackers - Ted Daisher; Defensive Backs – John Lovett

== Players ==
Ohio Force roster
Quarterbacks: 10 Connor Kaegi; 17 Nick Watson; 13 Cody Wilstead; 14 Mathew Winzeler; Running backs: 2 Demario McCall; 8 Christian Turner; 22 Charles West; 24 Devin Wynn; Wide receivers: 11 Andre Bodison; 23 Devin Childress; 16 Travier Fields-Jackson; 18 Reggie Hemphill-Mapps; 21 Jon'Vea Johnson; 4 Kameron Pleasant; 9 Alonso Russell; 82 Dez Stewart; 3 Reggie Todd; 30 David Turner; 20 Jordan Williams; Tight ends: 85 Keandre Bledsoe; 40 Vincent Hobbs; 46 Troy Shallow; 40 Anthony Totta; 88 Matthew Wilkinson	Offensive linemen: 73 Marcus Owens C; 76 David Brown OG; 59 Luke Juriga OG; 64 Dennis Bardwell OT; 70 Ruben Holcomb OT; 74 Nick Roos OT; Defensive linemen: 56 Jaylon Abdul-Karim DE; 90 Nathaniel Brison-Fast DE; 54 Sydney Omameh DE; 89 Ch'aim Smith DE; 91 JoJo Wicker DE; 57 Gibson Ziah DE; 94 Dakavian Champion DT; 98 DaShawn Crawford DT; 93 Kelvin Pinkney Jr DT; 92 Travonte Valentine DT; 66 Joseph Wallace DT	Linebackers: 44 Tavante Beckett; 33 Denzel Johnson; 41 Tristen Vance; 36 Jordan Williams; Defensive backs: 7 Antwaine Carter Jr; 35 Rishard Dames; 6 Jhavonte Dean; 5 Heath Harding; 1 Dedrick Mackey; 28 Joshua Miller; 34 David Simmons Jr; 25 Richard Dames; 15 Jonathan Alston; 12 Victor Hubbard; 27 Max Redfield; 26 Jalon Thigpen; Special teams: 45 Dominic DiMaccio K/P; 48 Kenny Doak K/P; 42 Logan Neidhardt K/P; 53 Sean Mills LS	Injured reserve: Currently vacant; Practice squad: Currently vacant; Did not report: Kayaune Ross; Aaron Tiller; Inactive: Currently vacant; Rookies in italics Roster updated July 24, 2022; 61 Active, 2 Inactive → More rosters
