= Virginia Armada =

MLFB team based in Virginia Beach, Virginia

Logo

General information
- Founded: 2022; 4 years ago
- Stadium: Virginia Beach Sportsplex
- Headquartered: Virginia Beach, Virginia
- Website: www.mlfb.com/Virginia

Personnel
- Owners: Major League Football, Inc. (publicly traded company)
- Head coach: Terry Shea

League / conference affiliations
- Major League Football

The Virginia Armada are a professional American football team based in Virginia Beach, Virginia. The team is a member of the Major League Football (MLFB), a publicly traded professional football league, and plays its home games at Virginia Beach Sportsplex.

The Force are part of the league "Core Four" teams. They are the first pro football team in Virginia since the United Football League Virginia Destroyers.

== History ==
On March 18, 2022, Major League Football launched a new website and revealed that there will be only four teams for the first season. On March 22 the league reveled their second coach in Terry Shea. The league would later reveal he will coach the Virginia Armada.

The Armada started their training camp on July 21. One week later, the team was evicted from its hotel amid unpaid bills and reports of the league shutting down.

== Staff ==
Virginia Armada staff
Head coaches: Head Coach and Offensive Coordinator – Terry Shea; Offensive coaches: Offensive Line - Art Valero; Wide Receivers/Tight Ends - Mike Wilson; Offensive Intern - Kyle Gallagher; Defensive coaches: Defensive Coordinator - Dennis Creehan; Defensive Line - Eric Hicks; Defensive Backs – Robert Trott; Defensive Intern - Mike James

== Players ==
Virginia Armada roster
Quarterbacks: 7 George Bowen; 4 Tyquell Fields; 12 D'Angelo Fulford; 5 Nik Rango; Running backs: 31 Tomas Newman; 3 BJ Smith; 22 Elliott Taylor; 21 Leroy Wilson; Wide receivers: 1 Erick Brundidge; 11 Marquise Irvin; 18 Arthur Jackson III; 16 Charlie Jones; 13 Alexis Rosario; 25 Cole Thurness; 2 Jaetavian Toles; 15 Melvin Vaughn; 8 Tevon Wright; Tight ends: 83 Quentin Chaplin; 88 Daniel Crawford; 80 Ceejhay French-Love; 85 Taron Mallard	Offensive linemen: 65 Pailake Aiono OL; 68 Terrance Ames OL; 72 Chris Boles OG; 63 Dustin Burns C/T; 77 Shane Carpenter OG; 60 Niko Culnan C; 62 Brad-Edward Davis G/C; 71 Daishawn Dixon OG; 74 Joseph Park OG; 76 T.J. Roundtree OG; 51 Taylor Tappin OT; Defensive linemen: 91 Javier Edwards DT; 93 Kaiona Fuiava DT; 95 Sha-Ki Holines DL; 96 Avien Peah DT; 90 Nick Raby DE; 48 Ethan Skarnas DE; 97 Shymere Vesels DT; 98 Lionell Wiggins DT; 94 John Williams DT; 99 Savian Williams DE	Linebackers: 44 Blair Brown; 46 Denzel Feaster; 49 Chrishom Frazier; 41 Patrick Howell; 45 Mark McLaurin; 40 Manoa Pikula; 47 Talyor Powell; 42 Phillip Redwine; Defensive backs: 27 M.J. Hampton; 20 David Jones; 41 Michael Palmer; 29 Derrion Rakestraw; 10 Delon Smith; 19 Kaseem Smith; 17 Boniface Stevens; 24 Roman Tatum; 28 Alex Thomas; 32 Jaylen Thomas; 14 Michael Witherspoon; 33 Coray Williams; Special teams: 9 Tyler Basch K; 50 Clay Dzizkan LS; 6 Clark Riedel P	Injured reserve: Currently vacant; Practice squad: Currently vacant; Inactive: Currently vacant; Rookies in italics Roster updated July 24, 2022; 66 Active, 0 Inactive → More rosters
