= Bill Conley =

American football coach (born 1950)

Biographical details
- Born: October 22, 1950 (age 76); Paintsville, Kentucky, U.S.
- Education: Ohio State University (1972)

Playing career
- 1968–1971: Ohio State
- Position: Guard

Coaching career (HC unless noted)
- 1972–1973: London HS (OH) (assistant)
- 1974–1977: London HS (OH)
- 1979–1981: Groveport HS (OH)
- 1982–1983: Middletown HS (OH)
- 1984–1987: Ohio State (ILB/RC)
- 1988–1990: Dublin Coffman HS (OH)
- 1991: Ohio State (RC)
- 1992–1996: Ohio State (DE/RC)
- 1997–2003: Ohio State (TE/RC)
- 2010–2015: Ohio Dominican
- 2022: Ohio Force

Head coaching record
- Overall: 46–21 (college); 78–39–3 (high school)
- Tournaments: 2–2 (NCAA D-II playoffs)

Accomplishments and honors

Championships
- As coach: 1 GLIAC (2013); 2 GLIAC South Division (2013–2014); As player: National (1968)

Awards
- GLIAC Coach of the Year (2013)

Bill Conley (born October 22, 1950) is a former American college football coach. He was the head football coach at Ohio Dominican University from 2010 to 2015, compiling a record of 46–21. Conley played college football at Ohio State University under head coach Woody Hayes as an offensive guard.

Conley served as an assistant at his alma mater, Ohio State, under head coaches John Cooper and Jim Tressel in two nonconsecutive stints from 1984 to 1987 and from 1991 to 2003.

Conley was the head football coach for London High School where he compiled a record of 30–8–2, Groveport High School where he compiled a record of 15–14–1, Middletown High School where he compiled a record of 15–5, and Dublin Coffman High School where he compiled a record of 18–12.

Conley was the head football coach for the cancelled 2022 Major League Football season for the Ohio Force.

== Head coaching record ==
=== College ===
Year	Team	Overall	Conference	Standing	Bowl/playoffs	AFCA^{#}
Ohio Dominican Panthers (Great Lakes Intercollegiate Athletic Conference) (2010–2015)
2010	0hio Dominican	2–8	2–8	5th (South)		
2011	Ohio Dominican	7–4	6–4	T–3rd (South)		
2012	Ohio Dominican	8–3	7–3	T–2nd (South)		
2013	Ohio Dominican	10–1	9–0	1st (South)	L NCAA Division II Second Round	12
2014	Ohio Dominican	11–2	9–1	1st (South)	L NCAA Division II Quarterfinal	4
2015	Ohio Dominican	8–3	7–3	2nd (South)		
Ohio Dominican:		46–21				
Total:		46–21				
National championship Conference title Conference division title or championship game berth
