= Damion Jeanpiere =

American gridiron football player (born 1996)

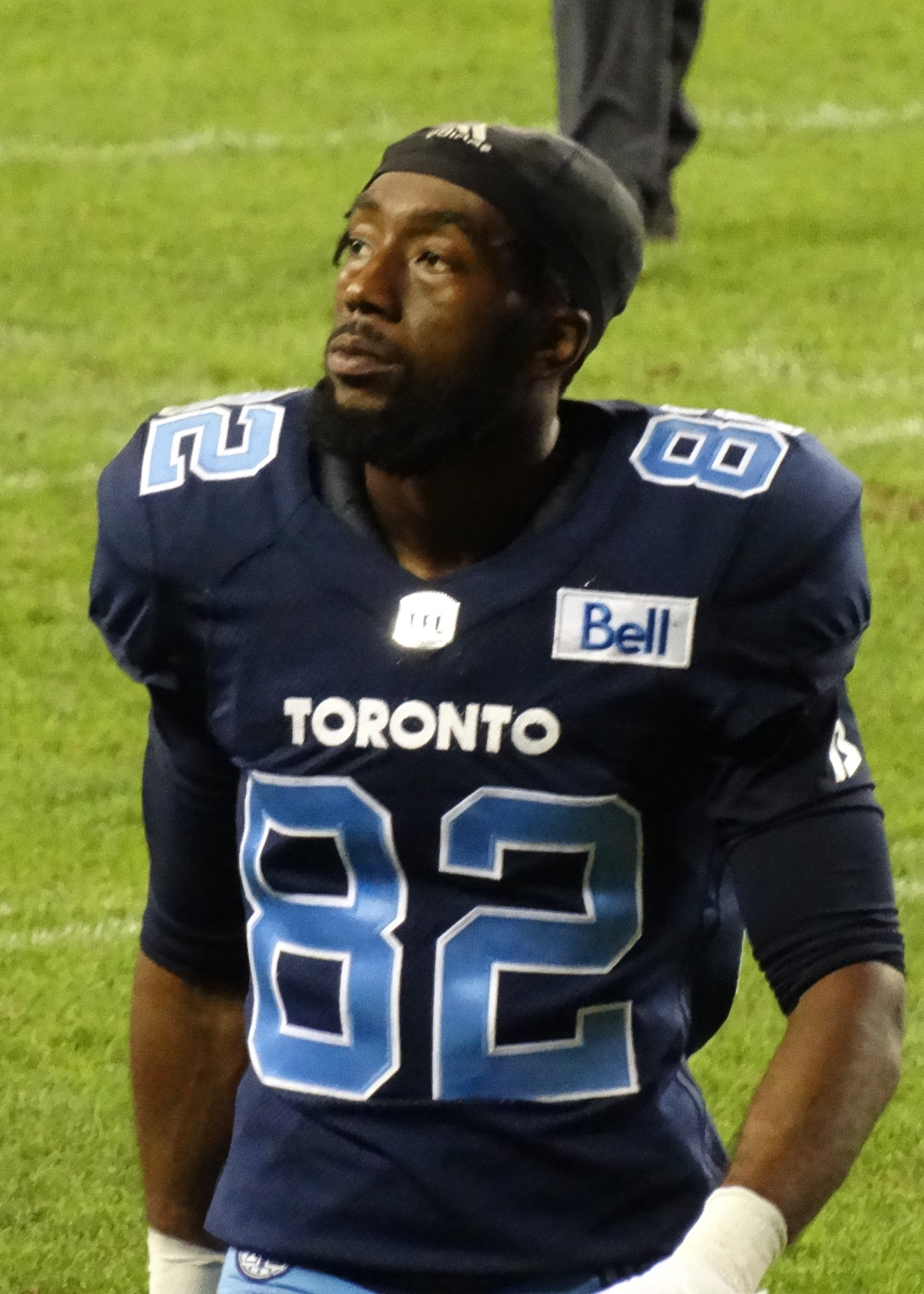
- Jeanpiere with the Argonauts in 2021.

Profile
- Position: Wide receiver

Personal information
- Born: December 8, 1996 (age 29); Kenner, Louisiana
- Listed height: 6 ft 1 in (1.85 m)
- Listed weight: 185 lb (84 kg)

Career information
- High school: Archbishop Rummel High
- College: Nicholls State

Career history
- 2019: Carolina Panthers*
- 2019: Toronto Argonauts*
- 2019–2020: Carolina Panthers*
- 2021–2022: Toronto Argonauts
- * Offseason or practice squad member only
- Stats at Pro Football Reference
- Stats at CFL.ca

Damion Jeanpiere Jr. (born December 8, 1996) is a professional Canadian football wide receiver who is a free agent. He most recently played for the Toronto Argonauts of the Canadian Football League (CFL).

== College career ==
Jeanpiere played college football for the Nicholls State Colonels from 2015 to 2018. He played in 41 games with the Colonels where he had 128 receptions for 2,324 yards and 14 touchdowns. He finished his collegiate career with the second most receiving yards in school history.

== Professional career ==
=== Carolina Panthers ===
After going undrafted in the 2019 NFL draft, Jeanpiere signed with the Carolina Panthers on April 29, 2019. He spent the preseason with the team, but was released at the end of training camp on August 30, 2019.

=== Toronto Argonauts ===
Jeanpierre signed with the Toronto Argonauts on September 17, 2019. He spent the remainder of the team's season on the practice roster and was released prior to the team's final game on November 2, 2019.

=== Carolina Panthers (II) ===
Jeanpiere was re-signed by the Carolina Panthers to the team's practice roster on December 24, 2019, and finished the 2019 season with the team. He attended the start of training camp with the Panthers in 2020, but was released on August 1, 2020.

=== Toronto Argonauts (II) ===
On February 15, 2021, it was announced that Jeanpiere had re-signed with the Toronto Argonauts. He began the year on the team's practice roster, but was promoted to the active roster for the fourth game of the season, making his professional playing debut on September 6, 2021, in the Labour Day Classic against the Hamilton Tiger-Cats. He also recorded his first career reception in that game and finished with one catch for eight yards. On October 6, 2021, he scored his first career touchdown on a 21-yard pass from McLeod Bethel-Thompson in a game against the Ottawa Redblacks. Jeanpiere played in six games where he had 13 receptions for 197 yards and one touchdown. In the following year, he was released with the final training camp cuts on June 5, 2022.

== Personal life ==
Jeanpiere was born to parents Damion and Desiree Jeanpiere. He has two younger sisters, Destinee and Daeja.
