= Alabama Airborne =

MLFB team based in Mobile, Alabama

Logo

General information
- Founded: 2022; 4 years ago
- Folded: 2022; 4 years ago
- Stadium: Ladd–Peebles Stadium
- Headquartered: Mobile, Alabama
- Website: www.mlfb.com/alabama

Personnel
- Owners: Major League Football, Inc. (publicly traded company)
- Head coach: Jerry Glanville

League / conference affiliations
- Major League Football

The Alabama Airborne was a professional American football team based in Mobile, Alabama. The team is member of the Major League Football (MLFB), a public traded professional football league, and plays its home games at Ladd–Peebles Stadium.

The Airborne were part of the league "Core Four" teams. They are the first pro football team in Mobile since the Regional Football League Mobile Admirals.

== History ==
On March 18, 2022, MLFB launched a new website and revealed that there will be only four teams for the first season. The Airborne weren't part of the initial announcement, as the plan was to put a team in Texas (Texas Independence) but after the league couldn't secure a stadium deal on time, they changed their plans and relocated the team to Mobile, Alabama six weeks before the start of the training camp. The Airborne started their training camp on July 21. One week later, the team was evicted from its hotel amid unpaid bills and reports of the league shutting down.

== Staff ==
Alabama Airborne staff
| Head coaches: Head coach – Jerry Glanville; Assistant Coach - Dynomite Kuhn; Offensive coaches: Quarterback and Wide Receiver - Jeff Reinebold; Offensive Line - Kris Cinkovich; Defensive coaches: Defensive Line/Linebacker – Robert Lyles; Defensive backs – Kim McCloud; Special Teams: Special Teams Coordinator – Jesse Thompson |

== Players ==
Alabama Airborne roster
| Quarterbacks: 1 Alvin Bush Jr.; 9 Chase Fourcade; 7 Maxwell Meylor; 11 Kyle Saddler; Running backs: 33 Tyler Nevin; 31 Jordan Salima; 36 Tabyus Taylor; 32 Arthur Thompkins WR; Wide receivers: 88 Montay Crockett; 86 Nick Holley; 17 Jimmie Robinson KR; 16 Jeremy Smith; 82 Zach Smith; 13 Jacorey Sullivan; 18 Kantavious Taylor; 19 Tim Wilson; Tight ends: 39 Tyrus Black; 87 Dashun David; 38 Desmond Maxwell; 80 Ari Werts | Offensive linemen: 67 Jared Aiekn OL; 72 Tyrin Arceneaux OL; 72 M.J. Dumas OG; 69 Josiah Hunter OG; 68 Noah Johnson OG; 70 Tre Johnson OT; 73 Kary Kutch OG; 66 Joseph Oliver III OL; 71 Osaro Oromosele OL; 65 Thomas Parker C; Defensive linemen: 59 Amel Cofield DE; 95 Nikolaus D'Avanzo DT; 99 Malik Dorton DL; 97 Youhanna Ghaifan DL; 98 Nick James DT; 91 E.J. Labaze DE; 96 Chigozie Nnoruka DT; 90 David Perkins DE; 94 Khristian Tate DL; 60 Tre Threat DE | Linebackers: 56 Kaelin Burnett OLB; 54 Rickey Chatman; 52 Quinlen Dean; 55 Beau Griego; 53 Zach Hall; 51 Royce See; 35 Cameron Solomon; 48 Mathew Stephenson; 50 Desmond Veals; Defensive backs: 31 Manny Asprilla; 24 D'Angelo Ellis; 42 Kentrell Everett; 27 Ajene Harris; 21 Prince Charles Iworah; 25 Ephraim Kitchen; 40 Xavier Lewis; 41 Zack Richardson; 47 Michael Sam; 27 Kemah Silverand; 34 Robert Taylor KR; 29 Zahir Williams; Special teams: 37 Bailey Griffin P; 47 Colten Menges LS; 28 Cesar Silva K/KO | Injured reserve: Currently vacant; Practice squad: Currently vacant; Inactive: Currently vacant; Rookies in italics Roster updated July 24, 2022; 64 Active, 0 Inactive → More rosters |
