= Earnest Wilson =

American football coach (born 1965)

Current position
- Title: Special teams coordinator & running backs coach
- Team: Edward Waters
- Conference: SIAC

Biographical details
- Born: March 30, 1965 (age 61); Columbus, Ohio, U.S.

Playing career
- c. 1988: Texas Tech

Coaching career (HC unless noted)
- 1990–1991: Allegheny (WR/TE)
- 1992: Maine (WR/TE)
- 1993–1994: Penn State (GA)
- 1995–1996: Alabama A&M (WR/TE/ST)
- 1997–1998: Elizabeth City State (OC/WR/QB)
- 1999: Oberlin (OC)
- 2000: Dayton Skyhawks
- 2001: Carolina Rhinos
- 2002: Jacksonville Tomcats
- 2003–2004: Benedict (OC)
- 2005–2009: New Mexico State (RB)
- 2010–2011: Jackson State (OC)
- 2012: Hampton (OC)
- 2013–2015: Savannah State
- 2016–2017: Elizabeth City State
- 2018–2020: Defiance (assoc. HC)
- 2021: Defiance
- 2022: Arkansas Attack
- 2023: Vermilion
- 2025–present: Edward Waters (STC/RB)

Administrative career (AD unless noted)
- 2024: Temple (chief of staff)

Head coaching record
- Overall: 12–52 (college); 1–6 (junior college)

Earnest J. Wilson III (born March 30, 1965) is an American football coach. He is the special teams coordinator and running backs coach for Edward Waters University, a position he has held since 2025. He was the head football coach at Minnesota North College – Vermilion, a junior college in Ely, Minnesota. Wilson was previously the head coach for the Arkansas Attack of Major League Football. He served as the head football coach at Savannah State University in Savannah, Georgia from 2013 to 2015, Elizabeth City State University in Elizabeth City, North Carolina from 2016 to 2017, and Defiance College in Defiance, Ohio for one season, in 2021.

== Coaching career ==
Wilson began his coaching career 1990 at Allegheny College. The 1990 team won the Stagg Bowl.

In May 2022, Wilson stepped down as the head coach at Defiance College. Shortly after his departure from Defiance was reported, Wilson was confirmed to be a head coach for Major League Football in their 2022 season.

In 2023, Wilson was hired as the head football coach at Minnesota North College – Vermilion. He led the Ironhawks to a 1–6 record during the 2023 season.

On June 4, 2024, Wilson was hired as the chief of staff for the Temple Owls.

== Head coaching record ==
=== College ===
Year	Team	Overall	Conference	Standing	Bowl/playoffs
Savannah State Tigers (Mid-Eastern Athletic Conference) (2013–2015)
2013	Savannah State	1–11	0–8	11th	
2014	Savannah State	0–12	0–8	11th	
2015	Savannah State	1–9	1–7	T–8th	
Savannah State:		2–32	1–23		
Elizabeth City State Vikings (Central Intercollegiate Athletic Association) (2016–2017)
2016	Elizabeth City State	5–5	4–3	T–3rd (Northern)	
2017	Elizabeth City State	4–6	2–5	5th (Northern)	
Elizabeth City State:		9–11	6–8		
Defiance Yellow Jackets (Heartland Collegiate Athletic Conference) (2021)
2021	Defiance	1–9	1–6	T–7th	
Defiance:		1–9	1–6		
Total:		12–52			

=== Junior college ===
Year	Team	Overall	Conference	Standing	Bowl/playoffs
Vermilion Ironhawks (Minnesota College Athletic Conference) (2023)
2023	Vermilion	1–6	1–5	6th	
Vermilion:		1–6	1–5		
Total:		1–6			
