= Terry Shea =

American football player and coach (born 1946)

Current position
- Title: Head coach
- Team: Virginia Armada

Biographical details
- Born: June 12, 1946 (age 80); San Mateo, California, U.S.

Playing career
- 1964–1967: Oregon
- Position: Quarterback

Coaching career (HC unless noted)
- 1968–1969: Oregon (GA)
- 1970–1975: Mt. Hood (assistant)
- 1976–1983: Utah State (assistant)
- 1984–1986: San Jose State (OC)
- 1987–1989: California (OC)
- 1990–1991: San Jose State
- 1992–1994: Stanford (AHC/OC)
- 1995: BC Lions (QB)
- 1996–2000: Rutgers
- 2001–2003: Kansas City Chiefs (QB)
- 2004: Chicago Bears (OC)
- 2005–2006: Kansas City Chiefs (QB)
- 2007: Miami Dolphins (QB)
- 2008: St. Louis Rams (QB)
- 2011–2012: Virginia Destroyers (OC/QB)
- 2014: Boston Brawlers
- 2015: Brooklyn Bolts
- 2020–2021: Aviators
- 2022–present: Virginia Armada

Head coaching record
- Overall: 26–50–2 (college)
- Bowls: 1–0

Accomplishments and honors

Championships
- 2 Big West (1990–1991); 1 UFL (2011)

Awards
- Big West Coach of the Year (1990); Big East Coach of the Year (1998)

Terrence William Shea (born June 12, 1946) is an American football coach and former player who was the head coach of the Aviators of The Spring League. Shea also performs quarterback consulting work for future NFL draft prospects. He worked with Robert Griffin III (2nd overall pick 2012), Blaine Gabbert (10th overall pick 2011), Sam Bradford (1st overall pick 2010), Matthew Stafford (1st overall pick 2009), and Josh Freeman (17th overall pick 2009), whom Shea later brought to the Chargers in 2015). Shea also trained and developed Collin Klein (Kansas State) and Tommy Rees (Notre Dame).

Born in San Mateo, California, Shea graduated from Bellarmine College Preparatory in San Jose in 1964.

From 1964 to 1967, he was one of the quarterbacks on the University of Oregon's football team. From 1968 to 1969, he was a graduate assistant coach at Oregon. From 1970 to 1975, he coached at Mount Hood Community College. From 1976 to 1983, he coached at Utah State. From 1984 to 1986, he was the offensive coordinator at San Jose State. From 1987 to 1989, he was the offensive coordinator at Cal.

From 1990 to 1991, he was the head football coach at San Jose State, where he compiled a 15–6–2 record. From 1992 to 1994, he coached at Stanford under Bill Walsh, and in 1995, he coached the British Columbia Lions. From 1996 to 2000, he was the head football coach at Rutgers University–New Brunswick. At Rutgers, he compiled an 11-44 record, awarded the Big East Coach of the Year in 1998 after posting a 5-6 record, the second biggest turnaround in college football at that time, and recruited and coached future NFL players L. J. Smith, Mike McMahon, Mike Barr, Nate Jones, and Reggie Stephens.

From 2001 to 2003, he was the quarterbacks coach for the Kansas City Chiefs. In 2004, he became the Offensive coordinator for the Chicago Bears where he gave himself a B− grade in an interview after the season, a season where the Bears ranked last in points scored. Following the 2004 season, he was replaced by former University of Illinois head coach Ron Turner. He then returned to the Kansas City Chiefs, once again as the quarterbacks coach in 2005. On January 12, 2007, he was fired by coach Herm Edwards and joined the Miami Dolphins shortly thereafter. Shea went on to coach the quarterbacks for the St. Louis Rams for the 2008 season.

Shea has coached mostly in alternative pro football leagues since 2011. For 2011 and 2012, Shea was offensive coordinator for the Virginia Destroyers of the United Football League. He coached in the Fall Experimental Football League for its entire existence; he helmed the Boston Brawlers in 2014 and the Brooklyn Bolts in 2015. Shea also coached several games for The Spring League (which is run by the same CEO as the FXFL was), an organization that seeks to help young players develop and gain exposure to professional scouts. He was named head coach of the Aviators of The Spring League on October 15, 2020.

== Head coaching record ==
=== College ===
Year	Team	Overall	Conference	Standing	Bowl/playoffs	Rank^{#}
San Jose State Spartans (Big West Conference) (1990–1991)
1990	San Jose State	9–2–1	7–0	1st	W California	20
1991	San Jose State	6–4–1	6–1	T–1st		
San Jose State:		15–6–2	13–1			
Rutgers Scarlet Knights (Big East Conference) (1996–2000)
1996	Rutgers	2–9	1–6	7th		
1997	Rutgers	0–11	0–7	8th		
1998	Rutgers	5–6	2–5	T–6th		
1999	Rutgers	1–10	1–6	8th		
2000	Rutgers	3–8	0–7	8th		
Rutgers:		11–44	4–31			
Total:		26–50–2				
National championship Conference title Conference division title or championship game berth
^{#}Rankings from final Coaches Poll.
