= Clarion Herald =

American Catholic newspaper published in New Orleans

- Type: Weekly newspaper
- Owner: Archdiocese of New Orleans
- Publisher: Gregory M. Aymond
- Editor: Peter P. Finney Jr.
- Founded: 1963
- Language: English
- Ceased publication: June 28, 2025
- Headquarters: 7887 Walmsley Ave, New Orleans, LA
- Website: clarionherald.org

The Clarion Herald is the official newspaper of the Catholic Archdiocese of New Orleans. It is affiliated with the Catholic Media Association and has won an award from the CMA. The newspaper is published weekly and an online copy is available free of charge to parishioners in local churches throughout the Greater New Orleans Area.

The stated mission of the Clarion Herald is to enable its readers to grow in their Catholic faith and to develop as mature, well-informed Catholics. The newspaper also functions as an outlet for editorials by the Archbishop of New Orleans and other leaders in the Catholic church. The newspaper frequently publishes articles on controversial subjects, such as abortion and the priest abuse scandals.

== History ==
John Cody, who was the Archbishop of New Orleans and later the archbishop of Chicago, authorized the creation of the Clarion Herald and subsidized its operations. The first issue was published on February 28, 1963. Cody's successor, Philip Hannan, reduced the newspaper's funding in 1966.

After Hurricane Katrina made landfall in New Orleans on August 28, 2005, publication of the newsletter ceased for a month and resumed on October 1, 2005. The newspaper extensively covered the recovery effort in all parishes in the New Orleans area. The Clarion Herald was previously published online in HTML format from 1999 to August 2005 and has since been published online in PDF format, in print, and online.

On March 19, 2025, the Clarion Herald announced that it would cease publication as of July 1, 2025, as two main sources of funding came to an end. The same report indicated that the Archdiocese of New Orleans is folding the newspaper into its communications department while looking for means of continuing publication in a lower cost format. Executive Editor Peter Finney Jr. said the he'll retire after the paper ceases and that the paper's five full-time employees will be laid off. The last issue was scheduled for June 28, 2025.
