= Major League Football (MLFB) =

Proposed professional American football league

- Most recent season or competition: 2022 Major League Football season
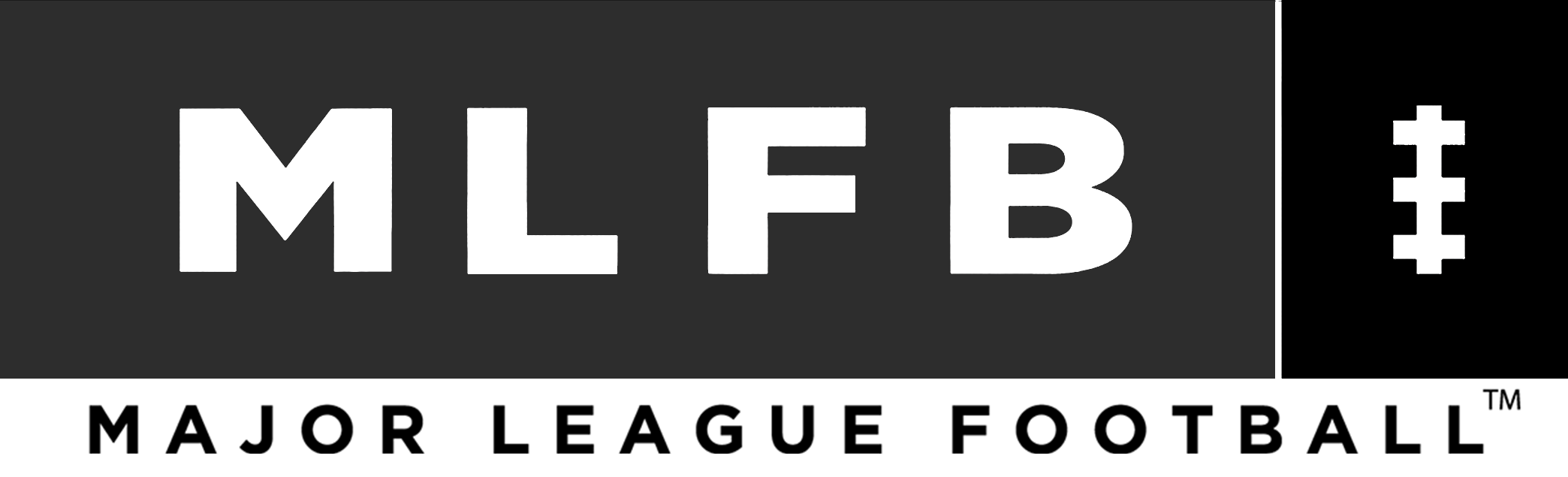
- Sport: American football
- Founded: 2014
- First season: 2016 (canceled)
- Owners: Major League Football, Inc. (publicly traded company (OTCQB: MLFB))
- CEO: Frank Murtha
- No. of teams: 4
- Country: United States
- Headquarters: Lakewood Ranch, Florida
- Website: mlfb.football

Major League Football (MLFB) is a proposed professional American football minor league consisting of teams that are all league-owned and Major League Football, Inc., is a publicly traded company.

MLFB was to operate on a strict budget, well under the Alliance of American Football, USFL and the XFL operating budget, while it plans to be a developmental league similar to the NBA G League or Triple-A baseball. Also, unlike most alternative professional football leagues since the 1980s, the league would've played its first season overlapping the traditional fall season (ending in September), competing directly with the NFL, college football, and high school football.

For the 2022 season, the players would have been paid $2,000 per game, with a $500 bonus for wins.

== History ==
=== Premise ===
Major League Football was founded in December 2014 with the intention of a being a spring football league in an attempt to fill the void left by minor or development football leagues such as the World Football League, the United States Football League, the XFL and United Football League (all of which lasted less than five years), and the then contemporary Fall Experimental Football League (FXFL). The league looked to establish teams in unrecognized U.S. markets such as Birmingham, Alabama; Memphis, Tennessee; Las Vegas, Nevada; Orlando, Florida; Portland, Oregon; Sacramento, California; and San Antonio, Texas. According to the league website, they also planned to expand to Mexico and Canada.

In its original incarnation, the league planned to start with 10 teams as part of a single entity ownership model, with a 12-week regular season schedule, a 43-player active roster, while players could participate in the league for no more than four years and there will be an "age-cap" at 32. It also planned to develop a non-conflicting and competitive league to the National Football League and other sports leagues in the United States (including the Arena Football League and Indoor Football League) and expand the media platform. The league named former NFL player Wes Chandler as its first president.

The MLFB single-entity business model, where the league owns and operates all of the teams, was supposed to be temporary, as the league goal was to have franchises be individual owner and operated by 2019 or 2020, with the franchises located in cities that are absent of NFL or Major League Baseball teams. The average attendance was expected to be between 12,500 and 15,000 fans by the end of the first season. The season was planned to run from April to July each year.

=== 2016: Canceled season ===
MLFB originally planned on having its inaugural season in spring 2016. In January 2016, the MLFB held a draft for eight teams based on territory and announced seven general managers (Jerry Hardaway, Rodney Knox, Gerald Loper, Glenn Smith, Quintin Smith, Stephen Videtich and Martin Prince) and eight head coaches (Dave Campo, Charlie Collins, Ted Cottrell, Robert Ford, Wayne 'Buddy' Geis, Galen Hall, Larry Kirksey and Chris Miller). However, in February 2016, a major financial backer of the league backed out of a $20 million commitment putting the league's first season in jeopardy. The league continued to push forward in an attempt to start games in April 2016, but was unable to come up with the needed financials in order to operate a full season. On March 31, the league announced that the first season would be postponed and 2016 would be considered a "developmental" year. Nevertheless, by June 2016, the league would miss at least four months of rent payments on its headquarters in Lakewood Ranch, Florida, and eviction papers were served for non-payment of rent beginning in March 2016.

While the team names were unannounced, MLFB filed trademarks for ten regional team names and have held a territorial draft for eight teams where the coaches drafted players based on region (all trademarks have since been abandoned as of 2019). The trademarked names were: Alabama Airborne, Arkansas Attack, Florida Fusion, Northwest Empire, Ohio Union, Oklahoma Nation, Oregon Crash, Texas Independence, Utah Stand and Virginia Armada

=== 2017: Takeover ===
In early 2017, the league registered websites for some of their teams that listed eight teams in the league: Alabama Airbourne, Arkansas Attack, Florida Fusion, Ohio Union, Oklahoma Nation, Oregon Crash, Texas Independence, and Virginia Armada.

In mid-2017, the league operations were taken over by Jerry C. Craig and a new group of directors based out of Huntington Beach, California, and planned to keep the eight franchises format, while the cities considered were: Birmingham and Montgomery, Alabama; Little Rock, Arkansas; Denton and Round Rock, Texas; Canton, Ohio; Memphis, Tennessee; Salt Lake City, Utah; Portland, Oregon; Shreveport, Louisiana; Albuquerque, New Mexico; and a city in Florida.

However, by October 2017, Craig apparently had failed to follow through with a purchase agreement and the general counsel resigned. On October 14, Craig also vacated his position as CEO and Director leaving the publicly traded company without management. Craig then went on to announce he was starting another league, with proposed start in spring 2018, called the Professional Football League. His new league also stated they would start with eight cities and listed several of the general managers and coaches associated with MLFB as part of the new league. Craig also clarified the PFL is a privately held entity and has no official association with the publicly traded MLFB.

=== 2018–2021 ===
On April 25, 2018, MLFB filed a Form 10-K with the intent to restart the league with an abbreviated 2018 season beginning in June or July prior to fully launching in March 2019. However, the start date was postponed every time the company filed a quarterly financial report. By July 2019, the league stated it was planning a 2020 start with six teams and that it had agreed to purchase most of the equipment from the recently defunct Alliance of American Football (AAF). The AAF equipment had been bought by former Arena Football League commissioner Jerry Kurz in a bankruptcy auction earlier that month.

In January 2020, CEO Frank Murtha stated that MLFB is "a developmental showcase league, with games in May and June in six midsize cities - Little Rock, Arkansas; Norfolk, Virginia; Canton, Ohio; and so on - that aren't served by the NFL or, for that matter, Major League Baseball" and said that the annual operating budget will be in the "ballpark of $30 million" as a single entity. The centralized all-players training camp was stated to be scheduled for April in Lakewood Ranch, Florida, where the league is headquartered. These tryouts did not take place in the midst of the COVID-19 pandemic and MLFB then announced plans for tryouts and camps in Lakewood Ranch for December 2020 through March 2021 for a 2021 season. However, these tryouts also did not take place and the league again postponed its demonstration season until summer of 2021, which also never took place due to continued pandemic restrictions. For the planned 2021 season, the players would have been paid between $2,500-$3,500 per game, with a $1,000 bonus for wins.

=== 2022: Second canceled season ===
In July 2021, they stated there would be a full season regular season in spring 2022 played in six cities. The league also claimed it had secured a line of credit for $1,000,000. On November 2, 2021, Murtha announced several cities to potentially house its six teams for a planned 2022 season: Mobile, Alabama; Montgomery, Alabama; Little Rock, Arkansas; Norfolk/Virginia Beach, Virginia; Canton/Massillon, Ohio; Daytona Beach, Florida; Orlando, Florida; Austin, Texas; Denton, Texas; San Antonio, Texas; and Oklahoma City, Oklahoma. Murtha also stated that training camp for the first six teams will be hosted at the Premier Sports Complex in Lakewood Ranch, Florida, in mid-April 2022 and all teams would return to their home cities after the camp.

On March 15, 2022, the league announced its first head coach in Jerry Glanville. Three days later MLFB launched a new website and revealed that there will be only four teams for the first season: Virginia Armada, Arkansas Attack, Ohio Force and Alabama Airborne. On March 22 the league reveled their second coach in Terry Shea. On March 30 former Ohio Dominican head coach, Bill Conley, was announced as the league third HC. After some delays and many candidates, MLFB hired their fourth coach for 2022 Earnest Wilson. Wilson was most recently the head coach at Defiance College.

It was reported that MLFB would be using 50 man rosters for the 2022 season and that league executives, coaches, and general managers would be responsible for selecting players via a draft and also via territorial selections. There are also reports that MLFB was closing in on a broadcast deal with a major media partner and had plans to provide coverage that focused on how coaches were developing players and helping them grow to the next level.

MLFB continued to make news as they announced one definitive term sheet offering a $7.5 million equity line of credit. Days later the League received a second term sheet for a similar $7.5 million equity line of credit which would give it access to $15 million in capital for the 2022 Season. Neither of these equity lines of credit were actioned on at the time. In early May, MLFB announced they had entered into a $10 million equity line agreement with an institutional investor. This is thought to give them the initial access to cash to begin moving forward quickly for their 2022 season.

It was reported in early June 2022 that the Virginia Armada would be playing at the Virginia Beach Sportsplex and that the Ohio Force would be playing at Tom Benson Hall of Fame Stadium. The Armada will be coached by Terry Shea and the Force will be coached by Bill Conley. It was also reported that players will be paid $2,000 per week of the regular season and that MLFB will be offering win bonuses as well. Connor Kaegi was reported to be the first quarterback under contract with MLFB.

On July 28, 2022, players from the Alabama Airborne and two other teams were abruptly evicted from the hotels where they were being housed over unpaid bills and reports from coaches that the league had "shut down" prior to the start of the season. MLFB acknowledged that a "funding delay" had forced the suspension of the 2022 season. This happened after a major financial backer of the league backed out of a $10 million commitment after, presumably, the league failed to put a team in San Antonio (and later San Marcos). Players were paid only $50-a-week stipend during training camp, before the league was shut down. Four days later it was reported that MLFB employees’ paychecks were "reversed", while the league official website was shut down as a result of unpaid bills.

On August 5, 2022, an unrelated league claimed the Major League Football brand with intent to launch in October of that year. The new league claims it had a trademark on the name Major League Football dating back to 2001 and they plan sending a cease and desist letter for trademark infringement.

=== 2023–present ===
On August 18, 2022, Murtha announced the league was moving forward with operations for a full season for 2023 and that MLFB had received from an institution an initial stock equity term sheet in the amount of $2,500,000, which it was reviewing. He also mentioned the league planned on paying all obligations previously incurred for player expenses and other trade obligations.

On March 14, 2023, the league announced they in "extensive and active discussions with a major broadcast company" and they "anticipate that our games will be in June and July with training camp in May, 2023". MLFB also mentioned that they were "in extensive discussions with an investor group interested in forming a similar league" and that four former and current NFL players made investment in the league. The league also hosted a "Houston Combine" that was attended by coaches Terry Shea and Earnest Wilson.

However, no season was played. Later the league officially announced the season cancellation, citing stocks underperformance (it hit $0.00 per share in late November 2023) as the main reason, with the league unable to fund a full four-team season at the cost of $12-15 million. MLFB also announced their plans for the 2024 season is to go to a fan ownership model.

== Rules ==
The rules of MLFB are basically the same as the NFL with a few differences such as:

- A 30-second play clock instead of the NFL's 40 seconds.
- 50-yard field goals being worth 4 points (former NFL Europe rule).
- The ground can cause a fumble.
- In the case of overtime, a 10-minute period will be played to determine a winner. Similar to former NFL rules, first score wins the game. In the event the game is still tied after overtime, there are alternating possessions from the 10-yard line; teams get four plays to score a touchdown and 2-point conversion.

== Teams ==
On March 18, 2022, MLFB launched a new website and revealed that there will be only four teams for the first season.

Club	City	Stadium	Capacity	Head coach
Alabama Airborne	Mobile, Alabama	Ladd–Peebles Stadium	40,000	Jerry Glanville
Arkansas Attack	Little Rock, Arkansas	War Memorial Stadium	54,120	Earnest Wilson
Ohio Force	Canton, Ohio	Tom Benson Hall of Fame Stadium	23,000	Bill Conley
Virginia Armada	Virginia Beach, Virginia	Virginia Beach Sportsplex	6,000 (expandable to 17,000)	Terry Shea

== Staff ==
- Frank Murtha – President and CEO (terminated October 4, 2017, by then CEO Jerry Craig; returned to the position and as acting president on November 1 after Craig's departure)
- Greg Campbell – CFO
- John "JJ" Coyne – Executive Vice President
- Bill Lyons – Chief Marketing Officer
- Mike McCarthy – Senior Vice President of Football Operations
- Steve Videtich - COO

=== Former staff ===
- Wes Chandler – President (resigned July 20, 2017)
- Michael Queen – Executive Vice President of Finance and CEO (resigned June 23, 2017)
- Jerry C. Craig – President & CEO, Chairman (from June 23 to October 14, 2017)
- Kristina E. Craig – Director of Marketing & Branding (resigned October 14, 2017)
- Rick Smith – Chief Operating Officer (resigned July 21, 2017)
- Ivory Sully – Vice President of Branding and Licensing (terminated July 20, 2017)
- Rick Nichols – Vice President of Business Development
- Rose Schindler – SEC Counsel
- Herm Edwards – Major League Football Senior Advisor
- Marc Bulger – Quarterback Advisory Team

== Media ==
On January 12, 2016, MLFB announced a two-year television deal with the American Sports Network.
