= 2019 Ohio State Buckeyes football team =

American college football season

2019 Ohio State Buckeyes football

Big Ten champion Big Ten East Division champion

Big Ten Championship Game, W 34–21 vs. Wisconsin

Fiesta Bowl (CFP semifinal), L 23–29 vs. Clemson
- Conference: Big Ten Conference
- East Division

Ranking
- Coaches: No. 3
- AP: No. 3
- Record: 13–1 (9–0 Big Ten)
- Head coach: Ryan Day (1st season)
- Offensive coordinator: Kevin Wilson (3rd season)
- Offensive scheme: West Coast spread
- Defensive coordinator: Greg Mattison (1st season)
- Co-defensive coordinator: Jeff Hafley (1st season)
- Base defense: 4–3 hybrid
- Captains: Tuf Borland; J. K. Dobbins; Master Teague; K. J. Hill; C. J. Saunders; Chase Young
- Home stadium: Ohio Stadium

Uniform
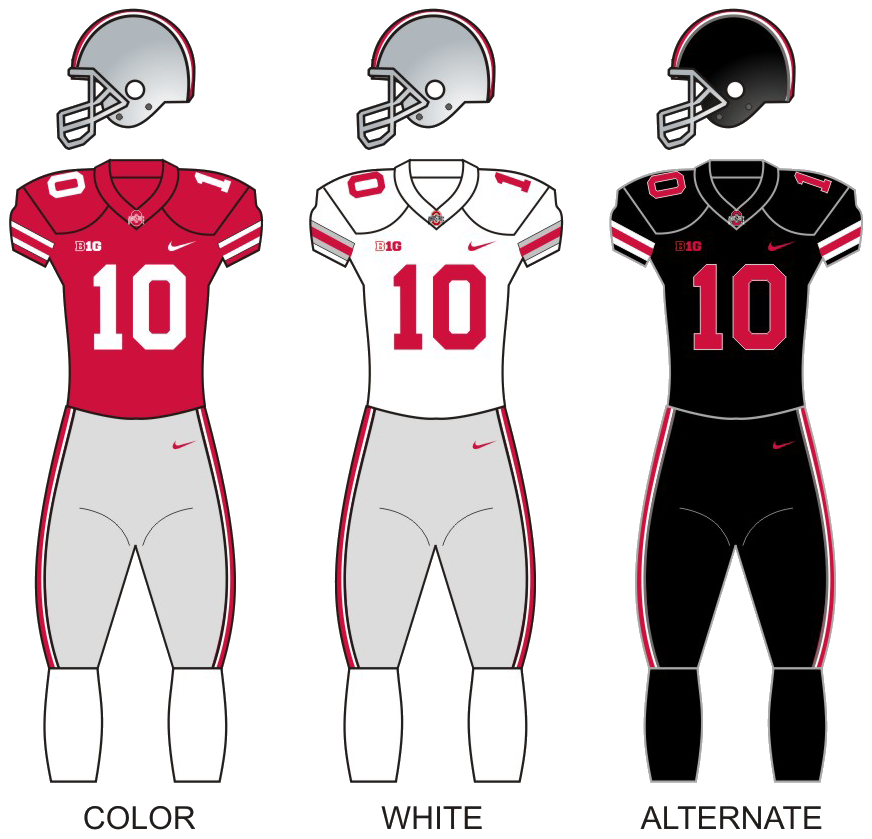

2019 Big Ten Conference football standings
| | Conf. | | | Overall |
| Team | W | | L | W | | L |
|---|---|---|---|---|---|---|
East Division
| No. 3 Ohio State xy$^ | 9 | – | 0 | 13 | – | 1 |
| No. 9 Penn State | 7 | – | 2 | 11 | – | 2 |
| No. 18 Michigan | 6 | – | 3 | 9 | – | 4 |
| Indiana | 5 | – | 4 | 8 | – | 5 |
| Michigan State | 4 | – | 5 | 7 | – | 6 |
| Maryland | 1 | – | 8 | 3 | – | 9 |
| Rutgers | 0 | – | 9 | 2 | – | 10 |
West Division
| No. 11 Wisconsin xy | 7 | – | 2 | 10 | – | 4 |
| No. 10 Minnesota x | 7 | – | 2 | 11 | – | 2 |
| No. 15 Iowa | 6 | – | 3 | 10 | – | 3 |
| Illinois | 4 | – | 5 | 6 | – | 7 |
| Purdue | 3 | – | 6 | 4 | – | 8 |
| Nebraska | 3 | – | 6 | 5 | – | 7 |
| Northwestern | 1 | – | 8 | 3 | – | 9 |
Championship: Ohio State 34, Wisconsin 21
^ – College Football Playoff participant; $ – Conference champion; x – Division champion/co-champions; y – Championship game participant; Rankings from AP Poll

The 2019 Ohio State Buckeyes football team represented Ohio State University during the 2019 NCAA Division I FBS football season. The Buckeyes played their home games at Ohio Stadium in Columbus, Ohio. This was the Buckeyes' 130th overall season and 107th as a member of the Big Ten Conference. They were led by Ryan Day, in his first season as Ohio State's full-time head coach.

Ohio State began the year ranked fifth in the preseason AP Poll. The Buckeyes climbed to number one in the College Football Playoff rankings by the end of the regular season, after dominating wins over Conference USA champion Florida Atlantic, American Athletic Conference runner-up Cincinnati, and Mid-American Conference champion Miami (OH) in the non-conference schedule; and comfortable wins over ranked Big Ten teams Wisconsin, Penn State, and Michigan in conference play. In the Big Ten Championship Game, Ohio State defeated Wisconsin a second time, by a score of 34–21 to win their third consecutive conference title. In the final CFP rankings of the season, Ohio State dropped from first to second, passed by SEC champion LSU, which placed Ohio State in the Fiesta Bowl to play defending national champion and third-seeded Clemson. Ohio State lost that game, 29–23, to end the year at 13–1. This would be the last time Ohio State defeated Michigan and achieved a perfect 12–0 regular season until 2025.

The Buckeyes were led on offense by sophomore quarterback Justin Fields, an incoming transfer from Georgia that was granted a waiver for immediate eligibility by the NCAA. He led the Big Ten with 3,273 passing yards and 41 passing touchdowns to go along with 10 rushing touchdowns, and finished third in voting for the Heisman Trophy. Running back J. K. Dobbins became the first Buckeye running back to eclipse the 2,000 yard mark, finishing tied atop the Big Ten with Wisconsin's Jonathan Taylor at 2,003 yards and 21 touchdowns. On defense, Ohio State was led by defensive end Chase Young, who led the country with 16.5 sacks and won several defensive player of the year awards while also finishing fourth in Heisman Trophy voting. He was also named a unanimous All-American, along with cornerback Jeff Okudah. Head coach Ryan Day was named Big Ten Coach of the Year by the media, becoming the first Ohio State head coach to win it since Earle Bruce in 1979.

== Preseason ==
=== Spring Game ===
The 2019 Spring Game was held at Ohio Stadium on April 13, 2019, with the Gray team defeating the Scarlet team, 35–17.

| Date | Time | Spring Game | Site | TV | Result | Attendance |
|---|---|---|---|---|---|---|
| April 13 | 12:00 pm | Scarlet vs. Gray | Ohio Stadium • Columbus, OH | BTN | Gray 35–17 | 60,000 |

=== Preseason Big Ten poll ===
Although the Big Ten Conference has not held an official preseason poll since 2010, Cleveland.com has polled sports journalists representing all member schools as a de facto preseason media poll since 2011. For the 2019 poll, Ohio State was projected to finish in second in the East Division behind Michigan.

== Schedule ==
Ohio State's 2019 schedule would begin with two non-conference home games, first against Florida Atlantic of Conference USA and then against Cincinnati of the American Athletic Conference. Ohio State's third non-conference game, a home game against Miami (OH) of the Mid-American Conference, would be played after the Buckeyes' conference opener against Indiana.

In Big Ten Conference play, Ohio State would play all members of the East Division and drew Nebraska, Northwestern, and Wisconsin from the West Division.

| Date | Time | Opponent | Rank | Site | TV | Result | Attendance |
|---|---|---|---|---|---|---|---|
| August 31 | 12:00 p.m. | Florida Atlantic* | No. 5 | Ohio Stadium; Columbus, OH | FOX | W 45–21 | 103,228 |
| September 7 | 12:00 p.m. | Cincinnati* | No. 5 | Ohio Stadium; Columbus, OH | ABC | W 42–0 | 104,089 |
| September 14 | 12:00 p.m. | at Indiana | No. 6 | Memorial Stadium; Bloomington, IN | FOX | W 51–10 | 47,945 |
| September 21 | 3:30 p.m. | Miami (OH)* | No. 6 | Ohio Stadium; Columbus, OH | BTN | W 76–5 | 103,190 |
| September 28 | 7:30 p.m. | at Nebraska | No. 5 | Memorial Stadium; Lincoln, NE (College GameDay) | ABC | W 48–7 | 89,759 |
| October 5 | 7:30 p.m. | No. 25 Michigan State^{†} | No. 4 | Ohio Stadium; Columbus, OH | ABC | W 34–10 | 104,797 |
| October 18 | 8:30 p.m. | at Northwestern | No. 4 | Ryan Field; Evanston, IL | BTN | W 52–3 | 47,330 |
| October 26 | 12:00 p.m. | No. 13 Wisconsin | No. 3 | Ohio Stadium; Columbus, OH (Big Noon Kickoff) | FOX | W 38–7 | 102,998 |
| November 9 | 12:00 p.m. | Maryland | No. 1 | Ohio Stadium; Columbus, OH | FOX | W 73–14 | 101,022 |
| November 16 | 3:30 p.m. | at Rutgers | No. 2 | SHI Stadium; Piscataway, NJ | BTN | W 56–21 | 33,528 |
| November 23 | 12:00 p.m. | No. 8 Penn State | No. 2 | Ohio Stadium; Columbus, OH (rivalry, Big Noon Kickoff, College GameDay) | FOX | W 28–17 | 104,355 |
| November 30 | 12:00 p.m. | at No. 13 Michigan | No. 1 | Michigan Stadium; Ann Arbor, MI (rivalry, Big Noon Kickoff) | FOX | W 56–27 | 112,071 |
| December 7 | 8:00 p.m. | vs. No. 8 Wisconsin | No. 1 | Lucas Oil Stadium; Indianapolis, IN (Big Ten Championship) | FOX | W 34–21 | 66,649 |
| December 28 | 8:00 p.m. | vs. No. 3 Clemson* | No. 2 | State Farm Stadium; Glendale, AZ (Fiesta Bowl – CFP Semifinal) | ESPN | L 23–29 | 71,330 |
*Non-conference game; ^{†}Homecoming; Rankings from AP Poll and CFP Rankings (after November 5) released prior to game; All times are in Eastern time

== Personnel ==
=== Roster ===
2019 Ohio State Buckeyes football team roster
Players
Coaches
Offense

| Pos. | # | Name | Class |
|---|---|---|---|
| QB | 1 | Justin Fields | So |
| RB | 2 | J. K. Dobbins (C) | Jr |
| QB | 4 | Chris Chugunov | GS |
| WR | 5 | Garrett Wilson | Fr |
| WR | 6 | Jameson Williams | Fr |
| WR | 7 | Kamryn Babb (injured) | Fr |
| RB | 8 | Xavier Johnson | So |
| WR | 9 | Binjimen Victor | Sr |
| QB | 10 | Danny Vanatsky | So |
| WR | 11 | Austin Mack | Sr |
| QB | 12 | Gunnar Hoak | Sr |
| TE | 13 | Rashod Berry | Sr |
| WR | 14 | K. J. Hill (C) | Sr |
| WR | 15 | Jaylen Harris | Jr |
| QB | 16 | Jagger LaRoe | Fr |
| WR | 17 | Chris Olave | So |
| QB | 18 | J.P. Andrade | Fr |
| RB | 22 | Steele Chambers | Fr |
| RB | 23 | Marcus Crowley | Fr |
| WR | 26 | Jaelen Gill | Fr |
| RB | 28 | Amari McMahon | Jr |
| RB | 30 | Demario McCall | Jr |
| RB | 33 | Master Teague | Fr |
| RB | 34 | Mitch Rossi | Jr |
| TE | 37 | Derrick Malone | Sr |
| RB | 43 | Robert Cope | Fr |
| C | 50 | Nathan Brock | Sr |
| OL | 52 | Wyatt Davis | So |
| OL | 55 | Matthew Jones | Sr |
| OL | 58 | Joshua Alabi | Sr |
| OL | 59 | Zach Stevenson | Fr |
| OL | 60 | Ryan Smith | Fr |
| OL | 61 | Gabin Cupp | Jr |
| OL | 62 | Brandon Pahl | Sr |
| OL | 63 | Kevin Woidke | Sr |
| OL | 64 | Jack Jamieson | Fr |
| OL | 66 | Enokk Vimahi | Fr |
| OL | 68 | Ryan Jacoby | Fr |
| OL | 69 | Chris Kuhn | Fr |
| OL | 71 | Josh Myers | So |
| OL | 73 | Jonah Jackson | GS |
| OL | 74 | Max Wray | Fr |
| OL | 75 | Thayer Munford | Jr |
| OL | 76 | Branden Bowen | Sr |
| OL | 77 | Harry Miller | Fr |
| OT | 78 | Nicholas Petit-Frere | Fr |
| OL | 79 | Dawand Jones | Fr |
| WR | 80 | C. J. Saunders (C) | GS |
| TE | 81 | Jake Hausmann | Jr |
| WR | 82 | Sam Wiglusz | So |
| TE | 83 | Cormontae Hamilton | Fr |
| TE | 84 | Brock Davin | Sr |
| WR | 85 | Austin Kutscher | So |
| WR | 86 | Chris Booker | Jr |
| WR | 87 | Ellijah Gardiner | So |
| TE | 88 | Jeremy Ruckert | So |
| TE | 89 | Luke Farrell | Jr |

Defense

| Pos. | # | Name | Class |
|---|---|---|---|
| CB | 1 | Jeff Okudah | Jr |
| DE | 2 | Chase Young (C) | Jr |
| CB | 3 | Damon Arnette | Sr |
| S | 4 | Jordan Fuller (C) | Sr |
| LB | 5 | Baron Browning | Jr |
| DT | 6 | Taron Vincent | So |
| LB | 7 | Teradja Mitchell | So |
| DE | 8 | Javontae Jean-Baptiste | Fr |
| DT | 9 | Jashon Cornell | GS |
| CB | 10 | Amir Riep | Jr |
| DE | 11 | Tyreke Smith | So |
| CB | 12 | Sevyn Banks | So |
| CB | 13 | Tyreke Johnson | Fr |
| LB | 16 | Cade Stover | Fr |
| DL | 17 | Alex Williams | Fr |
| DE | 18 | Jonathon Cooper (C) | Sr |
| LB | 19 | Dallas Gant | So |
| LB | 20 | Pete Werner | Jr |
| CB | 21 | Marcus Williamson | Jr |
| S | 23 | Jahsen Wint | Jr |
| CB | 24 | Shaun Wade | So |
| S | 25 | Brendon White | Jr |
| CB | 26 | Cameron Brown | Sr |
| S | 28 | Ronnie Hickman | Fr |
| S | 29 | Marcus Hooker | Fr |
| S | 30 | Kevin Dever | So |
| LB | 32 | Tuf Borland (C) | Jr |
| DE | 33 | Zach Harrison | Fr |
| S | 34 | Owen Fankhauser | Sr |
| LB | 36 | K'Vaughn Pope | So |
| LB | 37 | Craig Young | Fr |
| S | 38 | Bryson Shaw | Fr |
| LB | 39 | Malik Harrison | Sr |
| LB | 41 | Tommy Eichenberg | Fr |
| S | 41 | Josh Proctor | So |
| CB | 42 | Lloyd McFarquhar | So |
| S | 43 | Ryan Batsch | Fr |
| LB | 44 | Ben Schmiesing | So |
| LB | 46 | Cade Kacherski | So |
| LB | 47 | Justin Hilliard | Sr |
| LB | 48 | Logan Hittle | Sr |
| CB | 49 | Darryl Sinclair | Jr |
| DT | 51 | Brett Novick | Fr |
| DT | 52 | Antwuan Jackson | GS |
| DT | 53 | DaVon Hamilton | Sr |
| DE | 54 | Tyler Friday | So |
| LB | 55 | Trayvon Wilburn | So |
| DL | 56 | Aaron Cox | Sr |
| DT | 57 | Zaid Hamdan | Fr |
| DL | 67 | Robert Landers | Sr |
| DL | 70 | Noah Donald | Sr |
| DT | 72 | Tommy Togiai | So |
| DT | 90 | Jaden McKenzie | Fr |
| DT | 92 | Haskell Garrett | Jr |
| DE | 97 | Noah Potter | Fr |
| DT | 98 | Jerron Cage | So |

Special teams

| Pos. | # | Name | Class |
|---|---|---|---|
| K | 28 | Dominic Dimaccio | So |
| P | 29 | Zach Hoover | Jr |
| LS | 42 | Bradley Robinson | Jr |
| LS | 49 | Liam McCullough | GS |
| LS | 65 | Phillip Thomas | Jr |
| K | 90 | Jack Deneher | Fr |
| P | 91 | Drue Chrisman | Jr |
| P | 93 | Jake Metzer | Jr |
| LS | 94 | Roen McCullough | So |
| K | 95 | Blake Haubeil | Jr |
| P | 96 | Michael O'Shaughnessy | Fr |

Head coach

- Ryan Day

Coordinators/assistant coaches

- Larry Johnson (associate head coach / defensive line)
- Greg Mattison (co-defensive coordinator)
- Jeff Hafley (co-defensive coordinator / secondary)
- Kevin Wilson (offensive coordinator / tight ends)
- Mike Yurcich (passing game coordinator / quarterbacks)
- Al Washington (linebackers)
- Tony Alford (assistant head coach for offense / running backs)
- Brian Hartline (wide receivers)
- Greg Studrawa (offensive line)
- Matt Barnes (special teams coordinator / asst. secondary)
- Corey Dennis (senior quality control – offense)
- Chandler Whitmer (graduate assistant – offense)
- Trey Holtz (graduate assistant – offense)
- Kenny Anunike (graduate assistant – defense)
- Sean Duggan (graduate assistant – defense)
- Keenan Bailey (quality control coach – offense)
- Parker Fleming (quality control coach – special teams)
- Matt Thurin (quality control coach – defense)
- Drew Christ (quality control coach – defense)
- Mickey Marotti (assistant athletic director / director of football)

Legend

- (C) Team captain
- (S) Suspended
- (I) Ineligible
- Injured
- Redshirt

Roster
Last update: October 25, 2019

=== Coaching changes ===
- On December 4, 2018, head coach Urban Meyer announced his retirement from coaching effective after the 2019 Rose Bowl Game. Ryan Day was announced as his replacement.
- On December 8, 2018, Interim Wide Receivers Coach Brian Hartline was promoted to full-time wide receivers coach.
- On January 2, 2019, Oklahoma State offensive coordinator Mike Yurcich was hired by Ohio State as the new passing game coordinator and quarterbacks coach.
- On January 4, 2019, Ohio State Co-defensive coordinator and Safeties coach Alex Grinch was hired by Oklahoma as defensive coordinator.
- On January 7, 2019, defensive coordinator Greg Schiano and linebackers coach Billy Davis were fired by Ohio State, and replaced with Michigan Defensive line coach Greg Mattison and former San Francisco 49ers Defensive backs coach Jeff Hafley. Mattison and Hafley will serve as Co-defensive coordinators.
- Also On January 7, 2019, defensive line coach Larry Johnson was promoted to associate head coach, while continuing his duties as defensive line coach, he takes over for former associate head coach Greg Schiano who was fired earlier that day.
- On January 8, 2019, Ohio State hired Michigan linebackers coach Al Washington as the new linebackers coach.

== Depth chart ==
Starters and backups.

Defense

FS
4 Jordan Fuller
41 Josh Proctor

| WLB | MLB | SLB |
|---|---|---|
| 30 Pete Werner | 33 Tuf Borland | 39 Malik Harrison |
| ⋅ | 5 Baron Browning | 36 K'Vaughan Pope |

SS
25 Brendon White
23 Jahsen Wint

CB
1 Jeff Okudah
12 Sevyn Banks

| DE | DT | DT | DE |
|---|---|---|---|
| 2 Chase Young | 53 DaVon Hamilton | 9 Jashon Cornell | 18 Jonathon Cooper |
| 8 Javontae Jean-Baptiste | 67 Robert Landers | 92 Haskell Garrett | 33 Zach Harrison |

CB
24 Shaun Wade
10 Amir Riep

Offense

WR
2 Chris Olave
11 Austin Mack

H-Back
14 K. J. Hill
26 Jaelen Gill

| LT | LG | C | RG | RT |
|---|---|---|---|---|
| 75 Thayer Munford | 73 Jonah Jackson | 71 Josh Myers | 52 Wyatt Davis | 76 Branden Bowen |
| 58 Joshua Albai | 55 Matthew Jones | 77 Harry Miller | 61 Gavin Cupp | 77 Nicholas Petit-Frere |

TE
88 Jeremy Ruckert
89 Luke Farrell

WR
9 Binjimen Victor
5 Garrett Wilson

QB
1 Justin Fields
4 Chris Chugunov

Special teams
PK 95 Blake Haubeil
PK 28 Dominic DiMaccio
P 91 Drue Chrisman
P 29 Zach Hoover
KR 30 Demario McCall
PR 30 Demario McCall
LS 49 Liam McCullough
H 91 Drue Chrisman

RB
2 J. K. Dobbins
33 Master Teague

== Rankings ==
Ranking movements Legend: ██ Increase in ranking ██ Decrease in ranking т = Tied with team above or below ( ) = First-place votes
| | Week | | | | | | | | | | | | | | | | |
| Poll | Pre | 1 | 2 | 3 | 4 | 5 | 6 | 7 | 8 | 9 | 10 | 11 | 12 | 13 | 14 | 15 | Final |
|---|---|---|---|---|---|---|---|---|---|---|---|---|---|---|---|---|---|
| AP | 5 | 5 | 6 | 6 | 5 | 4 (7) | 3T(10) | 4 (9) | 3 (13) | 3 (17) | 3 (17) | 2 (5) | 2 (5) | 2 (9) | 2 (19) | 2 (12) | 3 |
| Coaches | 5 | 5 | 6 | 6 | 6 | 5 (4) | 4 (3) | 4 (4) | 4 (8) | 4 (8) | 4 (8) | 2 (5) | 2 (6) | 2 (7) | 2 (17) | 2 (14) | 3 |
| CFP | Not released | | | | | | | | | | 1 | 2 | 2 | 1 | 1 | 2 | Not released |

== Game summaries ==
=== Florida Atlantic ===
No. 5 Ohio State vs Florida Atlantic

| Team | 1 | 2 | 3 | 4 | Total |
|---|---|---|---|---|---|
| Florida Atlantic | 0 | 3 | 3 | 15 | 21 |
| • No. 5 Ohio State | 28 | 0 | 7 | 10 | 45 |

- Date: August 31, 2019
- Location:
  Ohio Stadium
  Columbus, OH
- Game start: 12:01 p.m. EDT
- Elapsed time: 3:23
- Game attendance: 103,228
- Game weather: Cloudy
- Referee: Ron Snodgrass
- TV announcers (FOX): Gus Johnson (play-by-play), Joel Klatt (color), Jenny Taft (sideline)

Summary

The No. 5 Ohio State Buckeyes (0–0, 0–0) faced the Florida Atlantic Owls (0–0, 0–0) in a home match up, and the first game under new head coach Ryan Day. The Buckeyes came in as heavy favorites over Lane Kiffin's Owls.

The Buckeyes found quick success on their opening possession on a 51-yard touchdown run from Georgia transfer Justin Fields. The offense went on to score three more touchdowns in the first quarter to take a 28–0 lead. The remainder of the half resulted only in a 28-yard FAU field goal to give the Buckeyes a 28–3 halftime lead.

The FAU offense would score a field goal on their opening possession to make it a three-possession game. The Buckeyes continued their woes until 2:37 left in the third quarter when Fields threw a 3-yard touchdown pass to tight end Jeremy Ruckert. The third quarter ended with the Buckeyes up 35–6. The fourth quarter had two drives that resulted in 14-points for the Owls and 10 for the Buckeyes.

Ohio State allowed 22 rushing yards behind defensive end Chase Young, who had a total of five tackles, 1.5 sacks and a pass deflection.

Statistics

Team
| Statistic | OSU | FAU |
|---|---|---|
| Total yards | 469 | 228 |
| Passing yards | 232 | 206 |
| Rushing yards | 237 | 22 |
| Penalties | 7-62 | 5-35 |
| Turnovers | 2 | 1 |
| Time of Possession | 32:03 | 27:57 |

Individual
| Stats | Ohio State | Florida Atlantic |
|---|---|---|
| Passing | Justin Fields (234) | Chris Robison (178) |
| Rushing | J. K. Dobbins (91) | James Charles (25) |
| Receiving | Chris Olave (68) | Harrison Bryant (79) |

=== Cincinnati ===
No. 5 Ohio State vs Cincinnati

| Team | 1 | 2 | 3 | 4 | Total |
|---|---|---|---|---|---|
| Cincinnati | 0 | 0 | 0 | 0 | 0 |
| • No. 5 Ohio State | 7 | 21 | 7 | 7 | 42 |

- Date: September 7, 2019
- Location:
  Ohio Stadium
  Columbus, OH
- Game start: 12:06 p.m. EDT
- Elapsed time: 3:04
- Game attendance: 104,089
- Game weather: Mostly cloudy
- Referee: Daniel Capron
- TV announcers (ABC): Bob Wischusen (play-by-play), Dan Orlovsky (color), Allison Williams (sideline)

Summary

The Cincinnati Bearcats (1–0, 0–0) had high hopes in defeating the No. 5 Ohio State Buckeyes (1–0, 0–0) after beating UCLA the previous week. The last win the Bearcats had over the Buckeyes was in 1897.

The Buckeyes took an early lead when the offense scored on their second possession, halfway through the first quarter. The Buckeye offense held the Bearcats to only two first downs in the opening quarter. The first scoring opportunity for Cincinnati came at the 11:29 mark with a 32-yard field goal that was blocked by Chase Young. The following three drives would result in three touchdowns by the Buckeyes and three punts by the Bearcats to make the halftime score 28-0 Ohio State.

Ohio State would score 14 more points in the second half and hold the Bearcats scoreless. The Bearcats had and opportunity to score when they got down to the OSU 4 but linebacker Tuf Borland intercepted a pass, thwarting the redzone attempt.

The shutout was the first for Ohio State since 2017 against Rutgers. Ohio State punter Drue Chrisman was named Big Ten Special Teams Player of the Week for his performance.

Statistics

Team
| Statistic | OSU | UC |
|---|---|---|
| Total yards | 508 | 273 |
| Passing yards | 238 | 166 |
| Rushing yards | 270 | 107 |
| Penalties | 2-25 | 10-78 |
| Turnovers | 0 | 2 |
| Time of Possession | 31:21 | 28:39 |

Individual
| Stats | Ohio State | Cincinnati |
|---|---|---|
| Passing | Justin Fields (224) | Desmond Ridder (166) |
| Rushing | J. K. Dobbins (141) | Tavion Thomas (58) |
| Receiving | Binjimen Victor (69) | Alec Pierce (93) |

=== At Indiana ===
No. 6 Ohio State at Indiana

| Team | 1 | 2 | 3 | 4 | Total |
|---|---|---|---|---|---|
| • No. 6 Ohio State | 7 | 23 | 21 | 0 | 51 |
| Indiana | 3 | 7 | 0 | 0 | 10 |

- Date: September 14, 2019
- Location:
  Memorial Stadium
  Bloomington, IN
- Game start: 12:01 p.m. EDT
- Elapsed time: 3:17
- Game attendance: 47,945
- Game weather: Sunny
- Referee: Jerry McGinn
- TV announcers (FOX): Gus Johnson (play-by-play), Joel Klatt (analyst), Jenny Taft (sideline)

Summary

The No. 6 Ohio State Buckeyes (2–0, 0–0) faced Big Ten East Division foe Indiana Hoosiers (2–0, 0–0) in Bloomington, Indiana. Indiana hoped to snap a 23-game Ohio State win streak that began in 1989.

Ohio State and Indiana traded scores in the first quarter to give the Buckeyes a 7–3 lead. The second quarter heavily favored Ohio State scoring three touchdowns and a safety on a blocked punt by Chris Olave. The Hoosiers scored their only touchdown of the game with 1:07 left in the second quarter, making the halftime score 30–10, Ohio State.

OSU went on to score touchdowns on their two opening possessions and intercepting an Indiana pass for a 96-yard return by Damon Arnette. Neither team would score again, making the final 51–10. Ohio State held the Hoosiers to just 42 yards rushing, making it the second time in three games that they held their opponent to under 100 yards.

J. K. Dobbins was named Big Ten co-Offensive Player of the Week for his 193-yard rushing and two total touchdown performance.

Statistics

Team
| Statistic | OSU | IU |
|---|---|---|
| Total yards | 520 | 257 |
| Passing yards | 214 | 215 |
| Rushing yards | 306 | 42 |
| Penalties | 5–45 | 5–54 |
| Turnovers | 1 | 1 |
| Time of Possession | 27:50 | 32:10 |

Individual
| Stats | Ohio State | Indiana |
|---|---|---|
| Passing | Justin Fields (199) | Peyton Ramsey (162) |
| Rushing | J. K. Dobbins (193) | Sampson James (14) |
| Rushing | J. K. Dobbins (193) | Peyton Ramsey (14) |
| Receiving | Chris Olave (70) | Peyton Hendershot (70) |

=== Miami (OH) ===
No. 6 Ohio State vs Miami (OH)

| Team | 1 | 2 | 3 | 4 | Total |
|---|---|---|---|---|---|
| Miami (OH) | 5 | 0 | 0 | 0 | 5 |
| • No. 6 Ohio State | 7 | 42 | 14 | 13 | 76 |

- Date: September 21, 2019
- Location:
  Ohio Stadium
  Columbus, OH
- Game start: 3:40 p.m. EDT
- Elapsed time: 3:12
- Game attendance: 103,190
- Game weather: Sunny
- Referee: John O'Neill
- TV announcers (BTN): Brandon Gaudin, James Laurinaitis, Elise Menaker

Summary

The No. 6 Ohio State Buckeyes (3–0, 1–0) faced the Miami RedHawks (1–2, 0–0) from the Mid-American Conference at Ohio Stadium. Ohio State came in as heavy favorites, having never lost to the RedHawks.

The Buckeyes found themselves quickly in a hole, trailing Miami 5–0 following a safety and a field goal halfway through the first quarter. Ohio State was able to finally score and take the lead on a 7-play, 75-yard drive that was topped off by a J. K. Dobbins 26-yard run at the 5:16 mark of the first quarter. The Buckeyes would go on to score touchdowns on all six of their possessions of the second quarter, and the defense would force three Miami turnovers. The Buckeyes lead at halftime 49–5.

Ohio State went to tack on two more touchdowns in both the third and fourth quarters and allowing the Miami offense to only gain 29 net yards. Ohio State scored their largest win since 2013.

Statistics

Team
| Statistic | OSU | MIU |
|---|---|---|
| Total yards | 601 | 130 |
| Passing yards | 374 | 60 |
| Rushing yards | 227 | 70 |
| Penalties | 6-52 | 4-50 |
| Turnovers | 1 | 3 |
| Time of Possession | 27:02 | 30:18 |

Individual
| Stats | Ohio State | Miami (Ohio) |
|---|---|---|
| Passing | Justin Fields (223) | Brett Gabbert (48) |
| Rushing | Steele Chambers (63) | Maurice Thomas (44) |
| Receiving | K. J. Hill (78) | Jack Sorenson (42) |

=== At Nebraska ===
No. 5 Ohio State at Nebraska

| Team | 1 | 2 | 3 | 4 | Total |
|---|---|---|---|---|---|
| • No. 5 Ohio State | 14 | 24 | 10 | 0 | 48 |
| Nebraska | 0 | 0 | 7 | 0 | 7 |

- Date: September 28, 2019
- Location:
  Memorial Stadium
  Lincoln, NE
- Game start: 6:44 p.m. CDT
- Elapsed time: 2:54
- Game attendance: 89,759
- Game weather: Overcast
- Referee: Jeff Servinski
- TV announcers (ABC): Chris Fowler (play-by-play), Kirk Herbstreit (analyst), Maria Taylor (sideline)

Summary

The No. 5 Ohio State Buckeyes (4–0, 1–0) faced the Nebraska Cornhuskers (3–1, 1–0) in a cross-divisional match up. The game would be featured on College GameDay. The previous match up ended with a narrow five-point Ohio State victory. The one and only Nebraska victory came in 2011 when the Cornhuskers defeated the Buckeyes 34–27 in Lincoln, Nebraska.

Nebraska began the game on a 31-yard drive that ended in an Adrian Martinez interception. The Buckeyes were able to take advantage of the turnover and drive 50 yards to score a Justin Fields touchdown run. The Buckeyes forced a three-and-out and scored another touchdown following a 60-yard drive. For the remainder of the half, Ohio State would score three more touchdowns and a field goal while intercepting two more Martinez passes and forcing three Cornhuskers' punts. Ohio State lead 38–0 at the half.

The Buckeyes were able to score 10 more points in the second half and the Cornhuskers were able to get on the board late in the third quarter, ending Ohio State's streak of eight quarters without allowing a touchdown. The final score ended in favor of Ohio State 48–7.

Statistics

Team
| Statistic | OSU | NEB |
|---|---|---|
| Total yards | 580 | 231 |
| Passing yards | 212 | 47 |
| Rushing yards | 368 | 184 |
| Penalties | 2-25 | 6-57 |
| Turnovers | 0 | 3 |
| Time of Possession | 36:54 | 23:06 |

Individual
| Stats | Ohio State | Nebraska |
|---|---|---|
| Passing | Justin Fields (212) | Adrian Martinez (47) |
| Rushing | J. K. Dobbins (177) | Adrian Martinez (81) |
| Receiving | Austin Mack (66) | Maurice Washington/Dedrick Mills (10) |

=== Michigan State ===
No. 4 Ohio State vs No. 25T Michigan State

| Team | 1 | 2 | 3 | 4 | Total |
|---|---|---|---|---|---|
| No. 25T Michigan State | 0 | 10 | 0 | 0 | 10 |
| • No. 4 Ohio State | 3 | 24 | 0 | 7 | 34 |

- Date: October 5, 2019
- Location:
  Ohio Stadium
  Columbus, OH
- Game start: 7:44 p.m. EDT
- Elapsed time: 3:18
- Game attendance: 104,797
- Game weather: Clear
- Referee: Larry Smith
- TV announcers (ABC): Chris Fowler (play-by-play), Kirk Herbstreit (analyst), Maria Taylor (sideline)

Summary

The No. 4 Ohio State Buckeyes (5–0, 2–0) faced the No. 25T Michigan State Spartans (4–1, 2–0) in an East Division contest. Ohio State wore all-black uniforms for the third time in the program's history. Ohio State came in to the game as 16-point favorites over the Spartans.

After the Buckeyes were forced to punt the ball on their initial possession, the Spartans fumbled the ball twice in four plays giving the Buckeyes two recoveries deep in their own territory. The turnovers resulted in three points from two field goal attempts. The Buckeyes would take a ten-point lead early in the second quarter, which was matched by the Spartans on the following drive, making the score 10–7, Ohio State. Michigan State was able to get another field goal before the end of the half, while Ohio State scored 17 additional points, making the halftime score 27–10, Ohio State.

Michigan State would not score any more during the game though they did attempt a 27-yard field goal in their opening possession of the second half. Ohio State would score again in the fourth quarter making the final 34–10. Notably, Justin Fields would throw his first interception of the season and fumble the ball away in the second half.

This game was the fourth time during the season that the defense allowed under 100 rushing yards.

Statistics

Team
| Statistic | OSU | MSU |
|---|---|---|
| Total yards | 529 | 285 |
| Passing yards | 206 | 218 |
| Rushing yards | 323 | 67 |
| Penalties | 10-85 | 4-30 |
| Turnovers | 2 | 3 |
| Time of Possession | 31:37 | 28:23 |

Individual
| Stats | Ohio State | Michigan State |
|---|---|---|
| Passing | Justin Fields (206) | Brian Lewerke (218) |
| Rushing | J. K. Dobbins (172) | Elijah Collins (63) |
| Receiving | Binjimen Victor (79) | Darrell Stewart Jr. (68) |

=== At Northwestern ===
No. 4 Ohio State at Northwestern

| Team | 1 | 2 | 3 | 4 | Total |
|---|---|---|---|---|---|
| • No. 4 Ohio State | 7 | 24 | 7 | 14 | 52 |
| Northwestern | 3 | 0 | 0 | 0 | 3 |

- Date: October 18, 2019
- Location:
  Ryan Field
  Evanston, IL
- Game start: 7:40 p.m. CDT
- Elapsed time: 3:05
- Game attendance: 47,330
- Game weather: Clear
- Referee: Daniel Capron
- TV announcers (BTN): Joe Davis, Brock Huard, Bruce Feldman

Summary

The No. 4 Ohio State Buckeyes (6–0, 3–0), faced Big Ten West Divisional opponent Northwestern Wildcats (1–4, 0–3) in a Friday night game at Ryan Field in Evanston, Illinois. Ohio State came in to the game as 27-point favorites over the Wildcats.

The game was originally set to air on FS1, but two days before the game, Fox decided to move the game to the Big Ten Network in order to air Game 5 of the 2019 American League Championship Series on FS1 instead.

Ohio State opened the game with a 10-play, 70-yard drive that resulted in a 20-yard touchdown pass from Justin Fields to Chris Olave. Northwestern followed with a quick first down run by Kyric McGowan on their first offensive play but after a Chase Young sack that put them well behind the chains, they were forced to punt. The Wildcats were able to force a three-and-out from the Buckeyes and muster together a nine-play, 44-yard drive that resulted in a 33-yard Charlie Kuhbander field goal to make the score 7–3.

Ohio State would go on to score touchdowns on their next two possessions, increasing their lead to 21–3. Northwestern attempted to punt on 4-and-7 at their own 24 with 4:10 left in the second half, but a bad snap gave the Buckeyes a first down at the 15, which resulted in a touchdown two plays later, increasing the lead to 28–3. Two drives later, Ohio State trapped Northwestern at their own 1 which resulted in a punt that only made it to the 36. With 0:04 left in the half, Ohio State's Blake Haubeil kicked a career-long 55-yard field goal with time expiring to give Ohio State a 31–3 halftime lead. Ohio State allowed only 85-yards in the first half.

Ohio State would go on to score three more touchdowns in the second half including a 73-yard run from Master Teague. Ohio State ended allowing only 199 total yards, 42 of which were passing. They won by a final score 52–3. J. K. Dobbins finished the game with 121 yards rushing which put him into the top five in total rushing yards in Ohio State's history.

Statistics

Team
| Statistic | OSU | NWU |
|---|---|---|
| Total yards | 480 | 199 |
| Passing yards | 201 | 42 |
| Rushing yards | 279 | 157 |
| Penalties | 5-58 | 8-76 |
| Turnovers | 0 | 2 |
| Time of Possession | 27:38 | 32:22 |

Individual
| Stats | Ohio State | Northwestern |
|---|---|---|
| Passing | Justin Fields (194) | Aiden Smith (42) |
| Rushing | J. K. Dobbins (121) | Isaiah Bowser (65) |
| Receiving | Chris Olave (60) | Riley Lees (19) |

=== Wisconsin ===
No. 3 Ohio State vs No. 13 Wisconsin

| Team | 1 | 2 | 3 | 4 | Total |
|---|---|---|---|---|---|
| No. 13 Wisconsin | 0 | 0 | 7 | 0 | 7 |
| • No. 3 Ohio State | 0 | 10 | 14 | 14 | 38 |

- Date: October 26, 2019
- Location:
  Ohio Stadium
  Columbus, Ohio
- Game start: 12:05 p.m. EDT
- Elapsed time: 2:56
- Game attendance: 102,998
- Game weather: Steady rain
- Referee: Mike Cannon
- TV announcers (FOX): Gus Johnson (play-by-play), Joel Klatt (analyst) and Jenny Taft (sideline)

Summary

The No. 3 Ohio State Buckeyes (7–0, 4–0) defeated their Big Ten West Divisional opponent the No. 13 Wisconsin Badgers (6–1, 3–1) by a score of 38–7 in a cross-divisional matchup. While the game received national attention for both teams' top defenses, Ohio State was favored by 14.5 points. Fox Sports chose this game to be the host of Big Noon Kickoff.

As the game began, rain fell at Ohio Stadium making the conditions very wet. Defense reigned supreme in the first quarter, as was expected. The Buckeyes were only able to gain 44 yards of total offense while Wisconsin put together 59. Passing appeared to be tough for both teams, forcing them to trade punts. The game was tied at 0–0 at the end of the first.

It wasn't until the 6:56 mark of the second quarter, when Ohio State's Blake Haubeil made a 49-yard field goal, that the stalemate was broken. Ohio State was able to halt Wisconsin's ensuing drive and get the ball back with 2:37 remaining. The Buckeyes found success on the drive and were able to drive 85 yards and score on a 27-yard pass from Justin Fields to Chris Olave. This score gave the Buckeyes a 10–0 lead at halftime.

Ohio State received the second-half kick which ended after failing to convert a first down. The Badgers were able to partially block their punt and it only went 13 yards, giving Wisconsin prime field position. In three plays, Wisconsin scored on a 26-yard touchdown pass from Jack Coan to AJ Taylor, making the score 10–7. Following the Wisconsin score, Ohio State would go on to score touchdowns on their next four drives, while Wisconsin would punt twice and fumble twice. The game would end with the Buckeyes winning 38–7.

J. K. Dobbins would be awarded Big Ten Offensive Player of the Week honors for his 221-yard, two-touchdown performance. Chase Young would be named Big Ten Defensive Player of the Week and Walter Camp National Player of the Week after recording four sacks and two forced fumbles.

Statistics

Team
| Statistic | OSU | WIS |
|---|---|---|
| Total yards | 431 | 191 |
| Passing yards | 167 | 108 |
| Rushing yards | 264 | 83 |
| Penalties | 2-15 | 3-30 |
| Turnovers | 0 | 2 |
| Time of Possession | 31:58 | 28:02 |

Individual
| Stats | Ohio State | Wisconsin |
|---|---|---|
| Passing | Justin Fields (167) | Jack Coan (108) |
| Rushing | J. K. Dobbins (163) | Jonathan Taylor (52) |
| Receiving | Chris Olave (93) | Quintez Cephus (57) |

=== Maryland ===
No. 1 Ohio State vs Maryland

| Team | 1 | 2 | 3 | 4 | Total |
|---|---|---|---|---|---|
| Maryland | 0 | 0 | 7 | 7 | 14 |
| • No. 1 Ohio State | 21 | 21 | 10 | 21 | 73 |

- Date: November 9, 2019
- Location:
  Ohio Stadium
  Columbus, Ohio
- Game start: 12:05 p.m. EST
- Elapsed time: 3:30
- Game attendance: 101,022
- Game weather: Partly cloudy
- Referee: Jerry McGinn
- TV announcers (FOX): Gus Johnson (play-by-play), Joel Klatt (analyst) and Jenny Taft (sideline)

Summary

The No. 1 Ohio State Buckeyes (8–0, 5–0) defeated the Maryland Terrapins (2–6, 1–5) 73–14, in an East Division match up at Ohio Stadium in Columbus, Ohio.

On Friday, November 8, the day before the game, it was announced that Chase Young was being withheld from the game and is suspended indefinitely (later reduced to two games) due to a potential violation of NCAA rules. Shortly after the announcement, Young acknowledged that he had accepted a loan from a family friend the year before, which he has since repaid.

Ohio State began the game by forcing the Terrapins to a three-and-out. On the Buckeyes' ensuing possession, Ohio State drove 47 yards in six plays to score a touchdown on a 12-yard pass from Justin Fields to Binjimen Victor. Ohio State would force another three-and-out on Maryland's next possession and would score again on an 11-play, 71-yard drive, giving the Buckeyes a 14–0 lead. Following the second scoring drive, the Buckeyes would conduct a successful onside kick and score again, giving OSU a 21–0 lead at the end of the first quarter. Ohio State would score three more touchdowns on their next three drives giving Ohio State a 42–0 halftime lead.

Ohio State began the second half with most of their second string in the game. Ohio State quarterback Chris Chugunov lead the offense into the red zone on the first drive of the second half, but fumbled the ball when he was sacked. On the next play, Maryland threw an interception which lead to a Buckeye touchdown two plays later. Ohio State would kick a field goal a drive later to give them a 52–0 lead. Maryland would be able to find the end zone twice, and Ohio State would find it three more times, to end the game 73–14.

Statistics

Team
| Statistic | OSU | UM |
|---|---|---|
| Total yards | 705 | 139 |
| Passing yards | 322 | 77 |
| Rushing yards | 383 | 62 |
| Penalties | 13-141 | 6-42 |
| Turnovers | 1 | 2 |
| Time of Possession | 36:41 | 23:19 |

Individual
| Stats | Ohio State | Maryland |
|---|---|---|
| Passing | Justin Fields (200) | Tyrrell Pigrome (42) |
| Rushing | Master Teague (111) | Javon Leake (55) |
| Receiving | Garrett Wilson (82) | Dontay Demus Jr. (26) |

=== At Rutgers ===
No. 2 Ohio State at Rutgers

| Team | 1 | 2 | 3 | 4 | Total |
|---|---|---|---|---|---|
| • No. 2 Ohio State | 21 | 14 | 14 | 7 | 56 |
| Rutgers | 7 | 0 | 7 | 7 | 21 |

- Date: November 16, 2019
- Location:
  SHI Stadium
  Piscataway, NJ
- Game start: 3:40 p.m. EST
- Elapsed time: 3:23
- Game attendance: 33,528
- Game weather: Windy
- Referee: Mark Kluczynski
- TV announcers (BTN): Brandon Gaudin, James Laurinaitis, Elise Menaker

The No. 2 Ohio State Buckeyes (9–0, 6–0) defeated the Rutgers Scarlet Knights (2–7, 0–6) by a score of 56–21 in a Big Ten East matchup at SHI Stadium in Piscataway, New Jersey. Ohio State was heavily favored in the game, with the line being 52 points. It also was the largest spread in Big Ten Conference history and the largest for both teams. This was also the largest spread in the NCAA since the 1989 NCAA Division I-A football season.

Turnovers on its first two possessions ruined any hopes for Rutgers as Justin Fields threw four touchdown passes. An interception and a fumble led to a 14–0 lead for Ohio State in the opening 3:36 on an 18-yard run by J. K. Dobbins and an 11-yard catch by Binjimen Victor for the first of his two TDs. Fields threw for a career best 305 yards on 15 of 19 completions. He has 31 TDs and one interception this season. Sophomore receiver Chris Olave set a career high with 139 yards on four catches.

Rutgers had two shining moments in the first half. After Dobbins' 8-yard run made it 21–0, the Scarlet Knights took advantage of a muffed punt return by Garrett Wilson and made it 21–7 late in the first quarter on a 26-yard TD run from Isiah Pacheco.

In the second quarter, Ohio State had third-and-goal from the 1 but Dobbins was stuffed for no gain, then dropped for a 1-yard loss. Ohio State had a 35–7 halftime lead and Fields quickly extended it to 42–7 with a 14-yard strike to Luke Farrell at 13:33 of the third on the QB's last snap of the game. Rutgers' Johnny Langan was 12 for 26 for 121 yards, an interception and a 45-yard TD pass to Bo Melton late in the third quarter against the backup secondary to make it 49–14. New Jersey resident Chris Chungunov replaced him and added two more TD tosses, a 4-yarder to Jake Hausmann and a 32-yarder to Jaelen Gill.

Langan had a 1-yard run left with 1:09 in the game making the final score 56–21.

Statistics

Team
| Statistic | OSU | RUTG |
|---|---|---|
| Total yards | 594 | 231 |
| Passing yards | 377 | 121 |
| Rushing yards | 217 | 110 |
| Penalties | 6-54 | 5-55 |
| Turnovers | 2 | 3 |
| Time of Possession | 28:34 | 31:26 |

Individual
| Stats | Ohio State | Rutgers |
|---|---|---|
| Passing | Justin Fields (305) | Johnny Langan (121) |
| Rushing | J. K. Dobbins (89) | Isiah Pacheco (56) |
| Receiving | Chris Olave (139) | Bo Melton (57) |

=== Penn State ===
No. 2 Ohio State vs No. 8 Penn State

| Team | 1 | 2 | 3 | 4 | Total |
|---|---|---|---|---|---|
| No. 8 Penn State | 0 | 0 | 17 | 0 | 17 |
| • No. 2 Ohio State | 7 | 7 | 7 | 7 | 28 |

- Date: November 23, 2019
- Location:
  Ohio Stadium
  Columbus, OH
- Game start: 12:05 p.m. EST
- Elapsed time: 3:08
- Game attendance: 104,355
- Game weather: Partly cloudy, rain
- Referee: Michael Cannon
- TV announcers (FOX): Gus Johnson (play-by-play), Joel Klatt (analyst) and Jenny Taft (sideline)

The No. 2 Ohio State Buckeyes (10–0, 7–0) defeated their rivals, the No. 8 Penn State Nittany Lions (9–1, 6–1) 28–17 in a Big Ten East matchup in Columbus, Ohio. Ohio State's campus hosted several television networks before the game. Most notably, ESPN College Gameday, FOX Sports' Big Noon Kickoff and Big Ten Network's BTN Tailgate. This was Ryan Day's first contest against Penn State, while it was James Franklin's sixth. Franklin is 1–5 against the Buckeyes with three of the last four games being decided by a total of five points. Ohio State entered the game as 20 1/2 point favorites over Penn State.

Chase Young was reinstated to the lineup starting with this game after serving a two-game suspension for violation of NCAA rules due to Young accepting a loan from a family friend the year before, which he has since repaid.

Statistics

Team
| Statistic | OSU | PSU |
|---|---|---|
| Total yards | 417 | 227 |
| Passing yards | 188 | 128 |
| Rushing yards | 229 | 99 |
| Penalties | 4-25 | 5-32 |
| Turnovers | 3 | 1 |
| Time of Possession | 34:15 | 25:45 |

Individual
| Stats | Ohio State | Penn State |
|---|---|---|
| Passing | Justin Fields (188) | Sean Clifford (71) |
| Rushing | J. K. Dobbins (157) | Journey Brown (64) |
| Receiving | K. J. Hill (46) | K. J. Hamler (45) |

=== At Michigan (The Game) ===
No. 1 Ohio State at No. 13 Michigan

| Team | 1 | 2 | 3 | 4 | Total |
|---|---|---|---|---|---|
| • No. 1 Ohio State | 14 | 14 | 14 | 14 | 56 |
| No. 13 Michigan | 13 | 3 | 3 | 8 | 27 |

- Date: November 30, 2019
- Location:
  Michigan Stadium
  Ann Arbor, MI
- Game start: 12:05 p.m. EST
- Elapsed time: 3:04
- Game attendance: 112,071
- Game weather: Cloudy, cold
- TV announcers (FOX): Gus Johnson (play-by-play), Joel Klatt (analyst) and Jenny Taft (sideline)

The No. 1 Ohio State Buckeyes (11–0, 8–0) defeated their archrival, the No. 13 Michigan Wolverines (9–2, 6–2) by a score of 56–27, in a Big Ten East matchup known as "The Game" at Michigan Stadium in Ann Arbor, Michigan. Ohio State entered into the game as 9 point favorites.

Statistics

Team
| Statistic | OSU | MICH |
|---|---|---|
| Total yards | 577 | 396 |
| Passing yards | 313 | 305 |
| Rushing yards | 264 | 91 |
| Penalties | 7-66 | 5-38 |
| Turnovers | 1 | 2 |
| Time of Possession | 36:25 | 23:35 |

Individual
| Stats | Ohio State | Michigan |
|---|---|---|
| Passing | Justin Fields (302) | Shea Patterson (305) |
| Rushing | J. K. Dobbins (211) | Hassan Haskins (78) |
| Receiving | Garrett Wilson (118) | Ronnie Bell (78) |

== Big Ten Championship Game ==
=== vs Wisconsin ===
No. 1 Ohio State vs. No. 8 Wisconsin

| Team | 1 | 2 | 3 | 4 | Total |
|---|---|---|---|---|---|
| • No. 1 Ohio State | 0 | 7 | 17 | 10 | 34 |
| No. 8 Wisconsin | 7 | 14 | 0 | 0 | 21 |

- Date: December 7, 2019
- Location:
  Lucas Oil Stadium
  Indianapolis, IN
- Game start: 8:15 p.m. EST
- Elapsed time: 3:04
- Game attendance: 66,649
- Game weather: Indoors (roof closed)
- TV announcers (FOX): Gus Johnson (play-by-play), Joel Klatt (analyst) and Jenny Taft (sideline)

The No. 1 Ohio State Buckeyes (12–0, 9–0) out of the Big Ten East defeated the No. 8 Wisconsin Badgers (10–2, 7–2) out of the Big Ten West by a score of 34–21 in the Big Ten Championship Game at Lucas Oil Stadium in Indianapolis, Indiana. Ohio State entered into the game as 15½-16½ point favorites.

Statistics

Team
| Statistic | OSU | WIS |
|---|---|---|
| Total yards | 492 | 432 |
| Passing yards | 320 | 232 |
| Rushing yards | 172 | 200 |
| Penalties | 4-40 | 4-41 |
| Turnovers | 1 | 0 |
| Time of Possession | 31:46 | 28:14 |

Individual
| Stats | Ohio State | Wisconsin |
|---|---|---|
| Passing | Justin Fields (299) | Jack Coan (232) |
| Rushing | J. K. Dobbins (172) | Jonathan Taylor (148) |
| Receiving | Chris Olave (94) | Quintez Cephus (122) |

== Fiesta Bowl – CFP Semifinal Game ==
=== Vs. Clemson ===
No. 2 Ohio State vs. No. 3 Clemson

| Team | 1 | 2 | 3 | 4 | Total |
|---|---|---|---|---|---|
| • No. 3 Clemson | 0 | 14 | 7 | 8 | 29 |
| No. 2 Ohio State | 10 | 6 | 0 | 7 | 23 |

- Date: December 28, 2019
- Location:
  State Farm Stadium
  Glendale, AZ
- Game start: 8:00 p.m. EST
- Game attendance: 71,330
- Game weather: Indoors (roof closed)
- Referee: Kevin Williamson (SEC)
- TV announcers (ESPN): Chris Fowler (play-by-play), Kirk Herbstreit (analyst), Maria Taylor (sideline), and Tom Rinaldi (sideline)

The No. 2 Ohio State Buckeyes (13–0) took on the No. 3 Clemson Tigers (13–0) in the Fiesta Bowl at State Farm Stadium in Glendale, Arizona. Ohio State entered the game as 2-point underdogs.

Statistics

Team
| Statistic | OSU | CLEM |
|---|---|---|
| Total yards | 516 | 417 |
| Passing yards | 320 | 259 |
| Rushing yards | 196 | 158 |
| Penalties | 8-77 | 6-47 |
| Turnovers | 2 | 0 |
| Time of Possession | 33:27 | 26:33 |

Individual
| Stats | Ohio State | Clemson |
|---|---|---|
| Passing | Justin Fields (320) | Trevor Lawrence (259) |
| Rushing | J. K. Dobbins (174) | Trevor Lawrence (107) |
| Receiving | K. J. Hill (67) | Travis Etienne (98) |

== Awards and honors ==
All-Conference Honors
| Player | Position | Coaches | Media | AP |
|---|---|---|---|---|
| Chase Young | DE | 1st Team | 1st Team* | 1st Team* |
| Jordan Fuller | S | 1st Team | 1st Team | 1st Team |
| Jeff Okudah | CB | 1st Team | 1st Team | 1st Team |
| Justin Fields | QB | 1st Team | 1st Team | 1st Team* |
| J. K. Dobbins | RB | 1st Team | 1st Team | 1st Team* |
| Jonah Jackson | G | 1st Team | 2nd Team | 2nd Team |
| Malik Harrison | LB | 1st Team | 2nd Team | 1st Team |
| Wyatt Davis | G | 2nd Team | 1st Team | 1st Team |
| Branden Bowen | OT | 2nd Team | 3rd Team | 2nd Team |
| Thayer Munford | OT | 2nd Team | 2nd Team | 2nd Team |
| Damon Arnette | CB | 2nd Team | 2nd Team | 2nd Team |
| Master Teague | RB | 3rd Team | 3rd Team | |
| Chris Olave | WR | 3rd Team | 3rd Team | |
| DaVon Hamilton | DT | 3rd Team | 3rd Team | 1st Team |
| Josh Myers | C | 3rd Team | 2nd Team | 2nd Team |
| Shaun Wade | CB | 3rd Team | 3rd Team | |
| Blake Haubeil | K | 3rd Team | 3rd Team | |
| Luke Farrell | TE | 3rd Team | HM | |
| K. J. Hill | WR | HM | HM | |
| Tuf Borland | LB | HM | HM | |
| Baron Browning | LB | HM | HM | |
| Jashon Cornell | DT | HM | HM | 2nd Team |
| Robert Landers | DT | HM | HM | |
| Pete Werner | LB | HM | HM | |
| Drue Chrisman | P | HM | HM | |

(*) denotes unanimous selection

Weekly Awards
| Player | Award | Date Awarded | Ref. |
|---|---|---|---|
| Drue Chrisman | Big Ten Special Teams Player of the Week | September 9, 2019 | |
| J. K. Dobbins | Big Ten Co-offensive Player of the Week | September 16, 2019 | |
| Chase Young | Walter Camp National Player of the Week | October 27, 2019 | |
| J. K. Dobbins | Big Ten Offensive Player of the Week | October 28, 2019 | |
| Chase Young | Big Ten Defensive Player of the Week | October 28, 2019 | |
| Chase Young | Nagurski National Defensive Player of the Week | October 30, 2019 | |
| Chase Young | Walter Camp National Player of the Week | November 24, 2019 | |
| Chase Young | Big Ten Defensive Player of the Week | November 25, 2019 | |
| J. K. Dobbins | Big Ten Co-offensive Player of the Week | November 25, 2019 | |
| J. K. Dobbins | Big Ten Offensive Player of the Week | December 2, 2019 | |

Annual Awards
| Player | Award | Date Awarded | Ref. |
|---|---|---|---|
| Ryan Day | George Munger Award Finalist | December 11, 2019 | |
| J. K. Dobbins | Doak Walker Award Finalist | November 25, 2019 | |
| J. K. Dobbins | Walter Camp Award Semifinalist | November 25, 2019 | |
| Justin Fields | Maxwell Award Semifinalist | October 29, 2019 | |
| Justin Fields | Davey O'Brien Award Finalist | November 25, 2019 | |
| Justin Fields | Walter Camp Award Semifinalist | November 25, 2019 | |
| Justin Fields | Heisman Trophy Finalist | December 9, 2019 | |
| Jordan Fuller | Wuerffel Trophy Nominee | October 25, 2019 | |
| Jordan Fuller | William V. Campbell Trophy Finalist | October 30, 2019 | |
| Jeff Hafley | Broyles Award Finalist | December 2, 2019 | |
| Jeff Okudah | Chuck Bednarik Award Semifinalist | October 29, 2019 | |
| Jeff Okudah | Jim Thorpe Award Finalist | November 25, 2019 | |
| C. J. Saunders | Burlsworth Trophy Nominee | November 5, 2019 | |
| Chase Young | Bronko Nagurski Trophy Winner | December 9, 2019 | |
| Chase Young | Chuck Bednarik Award Winner | December 12, 2019 | |
| Chase Young | Ted Hendricks Award Winner | December 12, 2019 | |
| Chase Young | Maxwell Award Finalist | November 25, 2019 | |
| Chase Young | Heisman Trophy Finalist | December 9, 2019 | |
Big Ten Awards
| Chase Young | Nagurski-Woodson Defensive Player of the Year | December 3, 2019 | |
| Chase Young | Smith-Brown Defensive Lineman of the Year | December 3, 2019 | |
| Chase Young | AP Big Ten Defensive Player of the Year | December 11, 2019 | |
| Justin Hilliard | Big Ten Football Sportsmanship Award | December 3, 2019 | |
| Ryan Day | Dave McClain Coach of the Year (media) | December 3, 2019 | |
| Ryan Day | AP Big Ten Coach of the Year | December 11, 2019 | |
| Justin Fields | Graham-George Offensive Player of the Year | December 4, 2019 | |
| Justin Fields | Griese-Brees Quarterback of the Year | December 4, 2019 | |
| Justin Fields | AP Big Ten Offensive Player of the Year | December 11, 2019 | |

=== All-American Players ===
NCAA Recognized All-American Honors
| Player | Position | AFCA | AP | FWAA | Sporting News | WCFF | Designation |
|---|---|---|---|---|---|---|---|
| Chase Young | DE | 1st Team | 1st Team | 1st Team | 1st Team | 1st Team | Unanimous |
| Jeff Okudah | CB | 1st Team | 1st Team | 1st Team | 1st Team | 1st Team | Unanimous |
| Justin Fields | QB | 2nd Team | 2nd Team | 2nd Team | - | 2nd Team | |
| J. K. Dobbins | RB/AP | 2nd Team | 2nd Team | 1st Team | 2nd Team | 2nd Team | |
| Wyatt Davis | G | 2nd Team | 1st Team | 2nd Team | 1st Team | 2nd Team | |
| Jonah Jackson | G | - | 3rd Team | | - | - | |
| Malik Harrison | LB | - | 3rd Team | | - | - | |

*The NCAA and Ohio State only recognize the AP, AFCA, FWAA, Sporting News and WCFF All-American teams to determine if a player is a Consensus or Unanimous All-American. To be named a Consensus All-American, a player must be named first team in three polls and to be Unanimous, they must be named first team in all five.

Other All-American Honors
| Player | Position | Athletic | Athlon | Bleacher Report | CBS Sports | CFN | ESPN | Fox Sports | Phil Steele | Scout | SI | USA Today |
|---|---|---|---|---|---|---|---|---|---|---|---|---|
| J. K. Dobbins | RB | 1st | | - | 1st | | - | | | | 2nd | 1st |
| Wyatt Davis | OL | 1st | | 1st | 1st | | 1st | | | | 2nd | 1st |
| Chase Young | DL | 1st | | 1st | 1st | | 1st | | | | 1st | 1st |
| Jeff Okudah | CB | 1st | | - | 1st | | 1st | | | | 1st | 1st |
| Justin Fields | QB | - | | - | 2nd | | - | | | | - | 2nd |
| Jordan Fuller | S | - | | - | 2nd | | - | | | | - | - |

See 2019 College Football All-America Team

== Players drafted into the NFL ==
| Round | Pick | Player | Position | NFL team |
|---|---|---|---|---|
| 1 | 2 | Chase Young | DE | Washington Redskins |
| 1 | 3 | Jeff Okudah | CB | Detroit Lions |
| 1 | 19 | Damon Arnette | CB | Las Vegas Raiders |
| 2 | 55 | J. K. Dobbins | RB | Baltimore Ravens |
| 3 | 73 | DaVon Hamilton | DT | Jacksonville Jaguars |
| 3 | 75 | Jonah Jackson | OG | Detroit Lions |
| 3 | 98 | Malik Harrison | ILB | Baltimore Ravens |
| 6 | 199 | Jordan Fuller | S | Los Angeles Rams |
| 7 | 220 | K. J. Hill | WR | Los Angeles Chargers |
| 7 | 235 | Jashon Cornell | DE | Detroit Lions |
