= 2017 Heart of Dallas Bowl =

2017 Zaxby's Heart of Dallas Bowl
- 8th Heart of Dallas Bowl
Utah Utes	West Virginia Mountaineers
(6–6)	(7–5)
Pac-12	Big 12 Conference
30	14
Head coach: Kyle Whittingham	Head coach: Dana Holgorsen
	1	2	3	4	Total
Utah	7	10	0	13	30
West Virginia	0	3	3	8	14
- Date: December 26, 2017
- Season: 2017
- Stadium: Cotton Bowl
- Location: Dallas, Texas
- MVP: Julian Blackmon (CB, Utah)
- Referee: Jeff Maconaghy (ACC)
- Attendance: 20,507

United States TV coverage
- Network: ESPN
- Announcers: Roy Philpott, Rene Ingoglia, Kris Budden

The 2017 Heart of Dallas Bowl was an American college football bowl game played on December 26, 2017, at the Cotton Bowl in Dallas, Texas. It was one of the 2017–18 bowl games concluding the 2017 FBS football season. The 8th edition of the Heart of Dallas Bowl, it was sponsored by fast food chicken restaurant Zaxby's, and was officially known as the Zaxby's Heart of Dallas Bowl.

The game featured the Utah Utes from the Pac-12 Conference against the West Virginia Mountaineers from the Big 12 Conference. Utah defeated West Virginia, 30–14.

== Team selection ==
The game featured conference tie-ins with teams from Conference USA and the Big 12 Conference. However, the bowl instead invited a team from the Pac-12 Conference. This was the second all-time meeting between the two schools, with the first occurring in the 1964 Liberty Bowl. It was the first Heart of Dallas Bowl for each team.

== Game summary ==
=== Scoring summary ===
Scoring summary

Quarter	Time	Drive			Team	Scoring information	Score	
Quarter	Time	Plays	Yards	TOP	Team	Scoring information	Utah	WVU
1	11:37	4	83	1:38	Utah	Zack Moss 58-yard touchdown run, Matt Gay kick good	7	0
2	13:09	11	67	4:29	WVU	28-yard field goal by Evan Staley	7	3
2	5:46	3	13	1:19	Utah	Tyler Huntley 2-yard touchdown run, Matt Gay kick good	14	3
2	1:08	9	56	3:12	Utah	29-yard field goal by Matt Gay	17	3
3	6:43	4	0	1:02	WVU	26-yard field goal by Evan Staley	17	6
4	13:59	7	39	2:35	Utah	Tyler Huntley 2-yard touchdown run, Matt Gay kick good	24	6
4	11:38	4	7	1:38	Utah	26-yard field goal by Matt Gay	27	6
4	4:15	8	20	4:03	Utah	24-yard field goal by Matt Gay	30	6
4	1:58	5	67	2:17	WVU	Ka'Raun White 18-yard touchdown reception from Chris Chugunov, 2-point pass good	30	14
"TOP" = time of possession. For other American football terms, see Glossary of American football.							30	14

=== Statistics ===
	1	2	3	4	Total
Utes	7	10	0	13	30
Mountaineers	0	3	3	8	14

Statistics	Utah	WVU
First downs	19	6
Plays–yards	80	51
Rushes–yards	53–197	21–29
Passing yards	165	124
Passing: Comp–Att–Int	12–27–0	10–30–2
Time of possession	38:34	21:26

Team	Category	Player	Statistics
Utah	Passing	Tyler Huntley	12/26, 165 yds
Utah	Rushing	Zack Moss	20 car, 150 yds, 1 TD
Utah	Receiving	Darren Carrington II	4 rec, 62 yds
West Virginia	Passing	Chris Chugunov	9/28, 129 yds, 1 TD, 2 INT
West Virginia	Rushing	Kennedy McCoy	14 car, 31 yds
West Virginia	Receiving	Gary Jennings	3 rec, 66 yds

== Media ==
The game was broadcast by ESPN, and kicked off at 1:30 p.m. ET.
