= Branden Bowen =

American football player (born 1996)

Profile
- Position: Offensive tackle

Personal information
- Born: September 17, 1996 (age 30); Draper, Utah
- Listed height: 6 ft 7 in (2.01 m)
- Listed weight: 315 lb (143 kg)

Career information
- High school: Corner Canyon (Draper, Utah)
- College: Ohio State
- NFL draft: 2020: undrafted

Career history
- Carolina Panthers (2020)*; Arizona Cardinals (2021)*
- * Offseason or practice squad member only
- Stats at Pro Football Reference

Branden Bowen (born September 17, 1996) is an American football offensive tackle who plays as a free agent. He played college football at Ohio State and was signed as an undrafted free agent by the Carolina Panthers after the 2020 NFL draft.

== College career ==
Bowen was ranked as a three–star recruit by 247Sports.com coming out of high school. He committed to Ohio State on November 23, 2014. Bowen started six games during the 2017 season at right guard before breaking his leg, sidelining him for the rest of the 2017 season and the entire 2018 season. He won the starting right tackle job after returning before the 2019 season.

== Professional career ==
Pre-draft measurables
Height	Weight	Arm length	Hand span
6 ft 6 1/2 in (1.99 m)	310 lb (141 kg)	33 5/8 in (0.85 m)	10 5/8 in (0.27 m)
All values from Pro Day

Bowen signed with the Carolina Panthers as an undrafted free agent after the 2020 NFL draft. Bowen was released as part of final roster cuts on September 5, 2020.

On February 17, 2021, Bowen was signed by the Arizona Cardinals. He was waived on August 24, 2021.
