= Master Teague =

American football player (born 2000)

Profile
- Position: Running back

Personal information
- Born: May 19, 2000 (age 26); Murfreesboro, Tennessee, U.S.
- Listed height: 5 ft 11 in (1.80 m)
- Listed weight: 220 lb (100 kg)

Career information
- High school: Blackman (Murfreesboro)
- College: Ohio State (2018–2021)
- NFL draft: 2022: undrafted

Career history
- Chicago Bears (2022)*; Pittsburgh Steelers (2022)*
- * Offseason or practice squad member only

Awards and highlights
- Second-team All-Big Ten (2020); Third-team All-Big Ten (2019)
- Stats at Pro Football Reference

Master Teague III (born May 19, 2000) is an American professional football running back who is a free agent. He played college football for the Ohio State Buckeyes, and high school football at Blackman High School in Murfreesboro, Tennessee.

== Early life ==
Playing at Blackman High School, Teague committed to Ohio State on June 11, 2017, when he released a video on Twitter. Teague chose the Buckeyes over South Carolina, Georgia and Auburn, among others. Coming out of high school Teague was a four-star prospect by 247Sports.com and Rivals.com. He was rated as the No. 8 running back by Rivals and No. 11 by 247Sports.

== College career ==
Teague enrolled at Ohio State University in January 2018, so that he could participate in Spring practice. Teague was behind J. K. Dobbins and Mike Weber in the depth chart. Though he was deep in the running back rotation, he did see the field in four games where he totaled 106 yards on 17 carries, and scoring on one 33-yard touchdown run against Oregon State.

Following a change in NCAA rules, Teague was able to earn a Redshirt for his true-Freshman year. Going into 2019, Teague battled for the back-up spot on the Buckeye roster behind Dobbins. He quickly earned the role and averaged 11 carries and 69 yards per game and also scoring three touchdowns through the first half of the season. He finished the year with 135 carries for 789 rushing yards and four rushing touchdowns. In the COVID-19 pandemic-shortened season in 2020, Teague had 104 carries for 514 rushing yards and eight rushing touchdowns in seven games. In the 2021 season, Teague appeared in seven games and had 67 carries for 355 rushing yards and four rushing touchdowns.

=== Statistics ===
Through 2021, Teague's statistics are as follows:

Ohio State Buckeyes
Season	Rushing				Receiving			
Season	Att	Yards	Avg	TD	Rec	Yards	Avg	TD
2018 (redshirt)	17	106	6.2	1	0	0	0	0
2019	135	789	5.8	4	4	60	15.0	0
2020	104	514	4.9	8	5	46	9.2	0
2021	44	252	5.5	3	2	12	6.0	0
Career	317	1,661	5.2	16	11	118	10.7	0

== Professional career ==
Pre-draft measurables
Height	Weight	Arm length	Hand span	40-yard dash	10-yard split	20-yard split	20-yard shuttle	Three-cone drill	Vertical jump	Broad jump	Bench press
5 ft 11 1/4 in (1.81 m)	221 lb (100 kg)	31 7/8 in (0.81 m)	9 1/2 in (0.24 m)	4.47 s	1.54 s	2.59 s	4.29 s	6.95 s	36.0 in (0.91 m)	10 ft 11 in (3.33 m)	27 reps
All values from the Ohio State Pro Day

=== Chicago Bears ===
Teague signed with the Chicago Bears as an undrafted free agent on May 6, 2022, but was waived three days later.

=== Pittsburgh Steelers ===
On August 3, 2022, Teague signed with the Pittsburgh Steelers. He was waived/injured on August 18 and placed on injured reserve. He was released on August 24. He was re-signed to the practice squad on November 23, 2022. He was released on December 7. He signed a reserve/future contract on January 10, 2023. He was released on May 22, 2023.
