= Jashon Cornell =

American football player (born 1996)

No. 96
- Position: Defensive end

Personal information
- Born: December 30, 1996 (age 29); Saint Paul, Minnesota, U.S.
- Listed height: 6 ft 3 in (1.91 m)
- Listed weight: 290 lb (132 kg)

Career information
- High school: Cretin-Derham Hall (Saint Paul)
- College: Ohio State (2015–2019)
- NFL draft: 2020: 7th round, 235th overall pick

Career history
- Detroit Lions (2020–2022)
- Stats at Pro Football Reference

Jashon Cornell (born December 30, 1996) is an American former professional football player who was a defensive end for the Detroit Lions of the National Football League (NFL). He played college football for the Ohio State Buckeyes. He played in one game in the NFL for the Lions.

== Early life ==
Cornell was considered the number one ranked defensive end prospect in the state of Minnesota, and number seven defensive end overall, by ESPN for the class of 2015.

== College career ==
Cornell redshirted in 2015 and only appeared in five games during his freshman year in 2017 due to a groin injury. During the 2018 season, he appeared in 13 games, where he recorded 14 tackles, 3.5 tackles-for-loss, and a forced fumble. He made his first start of his career on October 13, 2018, in a game against his hometown Minnesota Golden Gophers. During the 2019 season, Cornell started all 14 games and recorded 30 tackles, 6.5 tackles-for-loss, and four sacks. Following the season he was named an All-Big Ten Conference honorable mention by both coaches and media.

== Professional career ==
Cornell was selected by the Detroit Lions in the seventh round with the 235th overall pick in the 2020 NFL draft. On August 2, 2020, the Lions signed Cornell to a four-year contract. He was placed on injured reserve on August 20, 2020.

On June 3, 2021, Cornell was suspended three games after violating the league's substance-abuse policy. On November 10, 2021, Cornell was placed on the reserve/non-football illness list. He was activated on December 28.

On August 30, 2022, Cornell was waived/injured by the Lions and placed on injured reserve. He was released on September 5, 2022.
