= Damon Arnette =

American football player (born 1996)

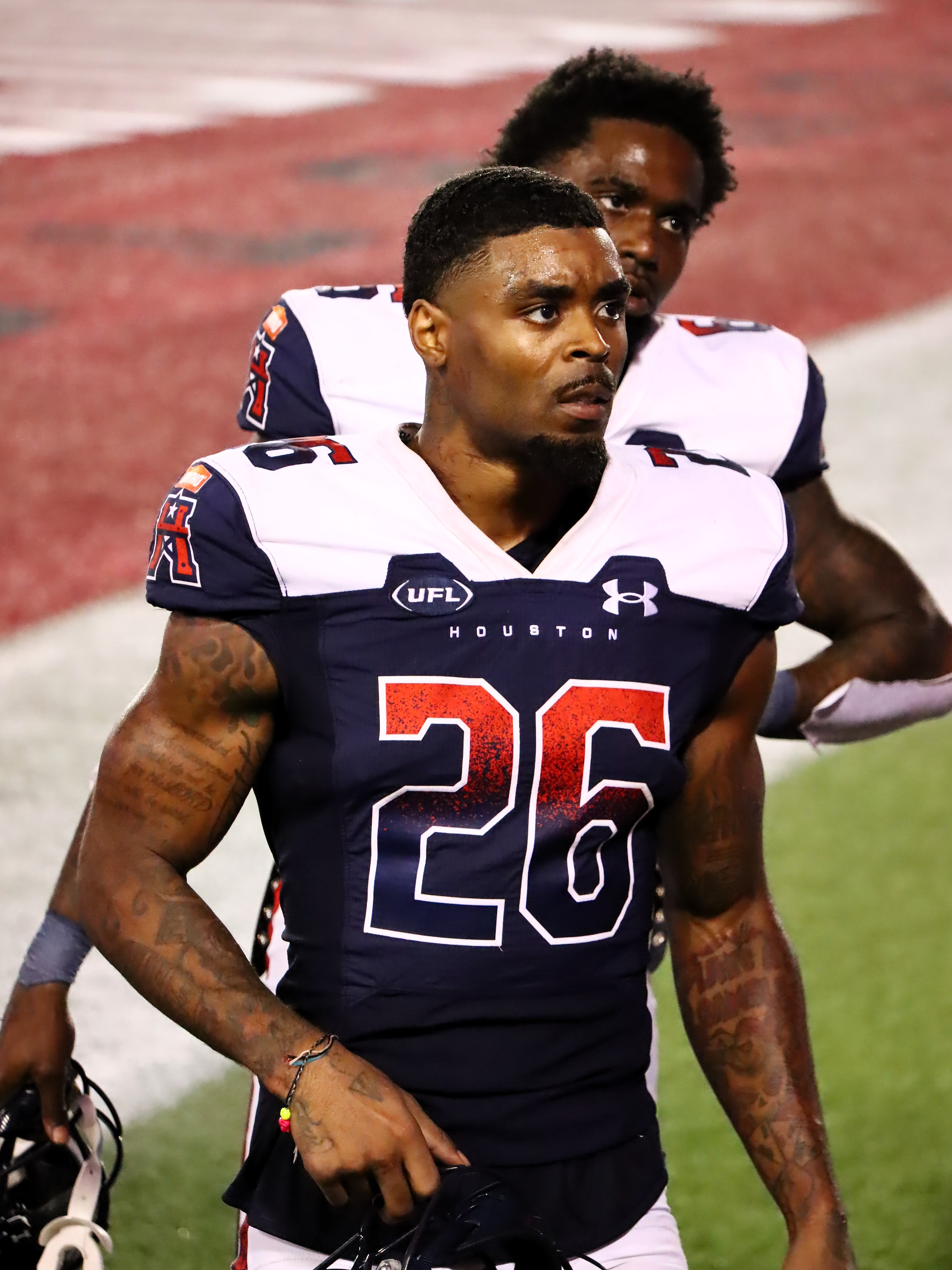
- Arnette with the Houston Roughnecks in 2025

No. 1 – Dallas Renegades
- Position: Cornerback

Personal information
- Born: September 2, 1996 (age 30); Dallas, Texas, U.S.
- Listed height: 6 ft 0 in (1.83 m)
- Listed weight: 195 lb (88 kg)

Career information
- High school: St. Thomas Aquinas (Fort Lauderdale, Florida)
- College: Ohio State (2015–2019)
- NFL draft: 2020: 1st round, 19th overall pick

Career history
- Las Vegas Raiders (2020–2021); Miami Dolphins (2021)*; Kansas City Chiefs (2022)*; Houston Roughnecks (2025); Houston Texans (2025); Houston Gamblers (2026); Dallas Renegades (2027–present)
- * Offseason or practice squad member only

Awards and highlights
- Second-team All-Big Ten (2019)

Career NFL statistics
- Tackles: 32
- Pass deflections: 3
- Stats at Pro Football Reference

Damon Elroy Arnette Jr. (born September 2, 1996) is an American professional football cornerback for the Dallas Renegades of the United Football League (UFL). He played college football for the Ohio State Buckeyes and was selected by the Las Vegas Raiders in the first round of the 2020 NFL draft.

== Early life ==
Arnette was born in Dallas, Texas, and moved to Fort Lauderdale, Florida, when he was three years old. He attended St. Thomas Aquinas High School, where he played linebacker and wide receiver for the Raiders. He was named honorable mention Class 8A-7A-6A All-County as a senior and helped lead the team to a state championship. Rated a three-star recruit, Arnette originally committed to play college football for the South Carolina Gamecocks during the summer going into his senior year before changing his commitment to Ohio State on national signing day.

== College career ==
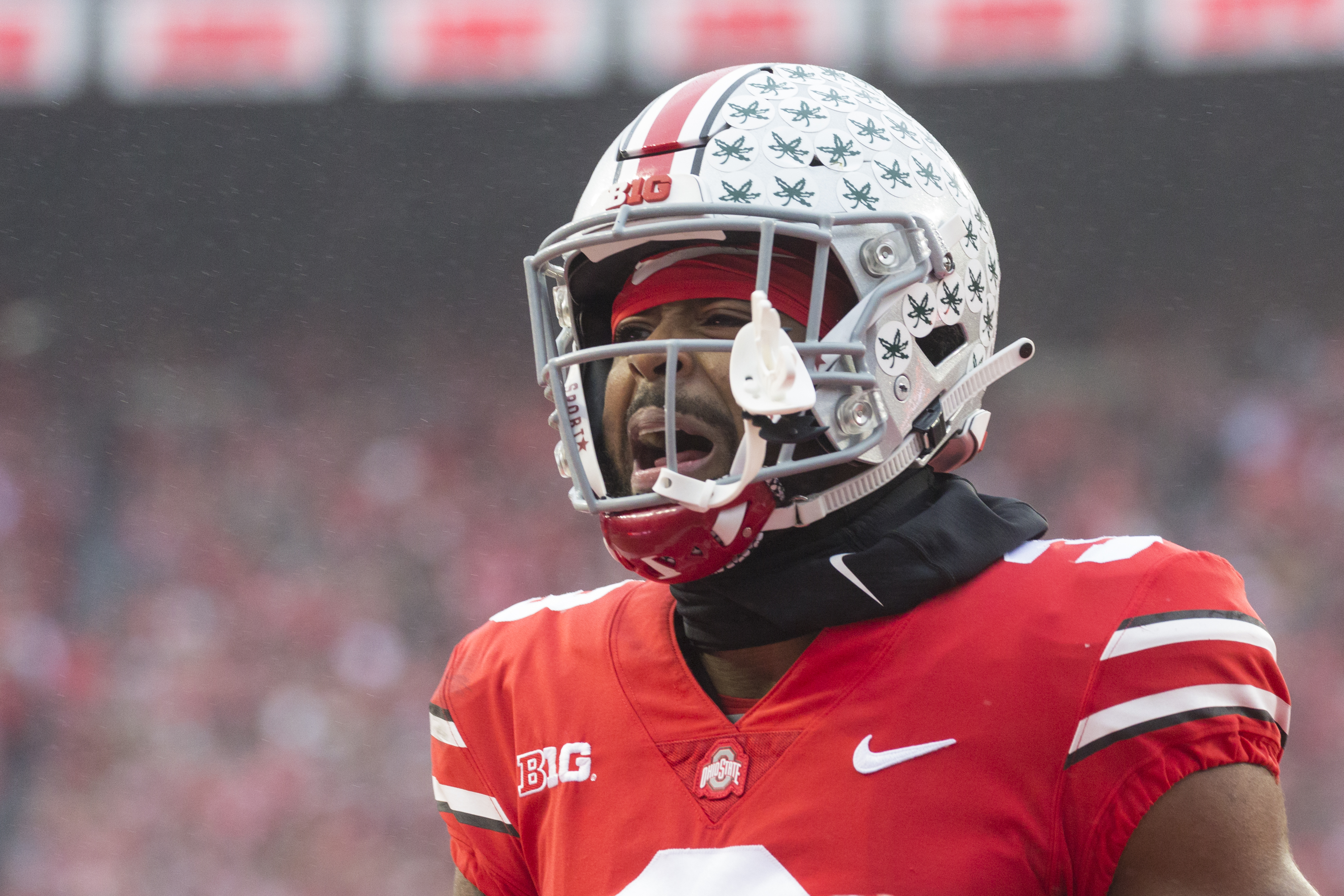
Arnette with the Ohio State Buckeyes in 2018

Arnette redshirted his true freshman season after a bone chip was discovered in his tibia during training camp. He played in 13 of Ohio State's games the following season as a key reserve at defensive back and recorded 21 tackles with one interception. As a redshirt sophomore, Arnette started 12 of the Buckeyes 14 games and led the team's cornerbacks with 44 tackles with two interceptions and eight passes broken up and was named honorable mention All-Big Ten Conference. Arnette was again named honorable mention as a junior, 40 tackles and one interception in 13 games played. Arnette originally planned to leave school and forgo his final season of NCAA eligibility to enter the 2019 NFL draft, but eventually decided to return to Ohio State for his final year of eligibility.

Arnette scored his first career touchdown on September 14, 2019, on a 97-yard interception return against Indiana. Arnette was named second-team All-Big Ten at the end of the season, recording 35 tackles, eight passes defended and one interception while playing with a broken wrist.

== Professional career ==
Pre-draft measurables
Height	Weight	Arm length	Hand span	Wingspan	40-yard dash	10-yard split	20-yard split
5 ft 11 5/8 in (1.82 m)	195 lb (88 kg)	30 in (0.76 m)	9 1/8 in (0.23 m)	6 ft 2 1/2 in (1.89 m)	4.56 s	1.56 s	2.67 s
All values from NFL Combine

=== Las Vegas Raiders ===
Arnette was selected by the Las Vegas Raiders in the first round with the 19th overall pick of the 2020 NFL draft. The Raiders previously obtained the 19th selection as part of the trade that sent Khalil Mack to the Chicago Bears in 2018. He was placed on injured reserve on October 2, 2020, with a thumb injury. He was moved to the reserve/COVID-19 list by the team on October 19, and was moved back to injured reserve on October 30. He was activated to the active roster on November 14.

Arnette entered the 2021 season as a backup cornerback behind Trayvon Mullen and Casey Hayward. He suffered a groin injury in Week 4 and was placed on injured reserve. The Raiders released him on November 8, 2021, after the discovery of a video showing him brandishing firearms and making death threats.

=== Miami Dolphins ===
On December 15, 2021, Arnette was signed to the practice squad of the Miami Dolphins. His contract expired when the team's season ended on January 9, 2022.

=== Kansas City Chiefs ===
Arnette signed a reserve/futures contract with the Kansas City Chiefs on January 20, 2022. He was released on January 29, after he was arrested on charges of assault with a deadly weapon, carrying a concealed weapon without a permit, and two counts of possession of controlled substances in Las Vegas, Nevada.

=== Houston Roughnecks ===
On December 30, 2024, Arnette signed with the Houston Roughnecks of the United Football League (UFL).

=== Houston Texans ===
On June 20, 2025, Arnette signed a one-year deal with the Houston Texans. He was waived on August 26 as part of final roster cuts, and re-signed to the practice squad. On November 7, Arnette was signed to the active roster. He was waived by the team on November 15 and re-signed to the practice squad four days later. He was released on December 23.

=== Houston Gamblers ===
On March 16, 2026, Arnette re-signed with the Houston Gamblers.

== Personal life ==
Arnette has three children: two daughters and a son. He is also a rapper under the stage name NWG Suave.

== Legal issues ==
On November 5, 2021, Arnette was accused of injuring a woman in a 2020 car crash. On October 14, 2020, Arnette allegedly slammed into the woman's car after missing a turn on the way to team practice, then left the scene. The crash occurred with Arnette traveling at 65 miles per hour, which allegedly caused the woman "head trauma" and "shoulder, neck, and back pain as well as depression and panic attacks."

On November 8, 2021, a video was discovered of Arnette in which he brandished firearms and was making death threats. This video led to his release from the Raiders.

On January 29, 2022, Arnette was arrested in Las Vegas, Nevada, on charges of assault with a deadly weapon, carrying a concealed weapon without a permit, and two counts of possession of controlled substances. On July 25, Las Vegas authorities announced no criminal charges would be filed. However, on May 16, 2023, it was announced that a grand jury had indicted Arnette for assault with a deadly weapon and other firearms charges relating from this incident. On August 7, Arnette formally agreed to a plea deal and was sentenced to 50 hours of community service, $2,000 in fines, surrendering the gun he had when he was arrested, and ordered to not violate any laws for 90 days.

On the night of July 25, 2022, Arnette was pulled over and found to have a suspended license. He was released with the police allowing the passenger to drive the vehicle. Hours later, shortly after midnight on July 26, Arnette was again pulled over driving the same vehicle, and this time was placed under arrest and charged with possession of a controlled substance, possession of drug paraphernalia and driving on a suspended license. He was later released on bond.

Arnette was again arrested on January 6, 2024, at 3:30am in Richardson, Texas. He was charged with possession of methamphetamine and unlawful carrying of a firearm.

== Career statistics ==
=== NFL ===
Year	Team	GP	GS	Solo	Ast	Tot	TFL	PD
2020	LVR	9	7	21	4	25	1	2
2021	LVR	4	0	2	2	4	0	1
Career		13	7	23	6	29	1	3

=== UFL ===
Year	Team	GP	GS	Solo	Ast	Tot	TFL	PD
2025	HOU	8	8	18	1	19	0	0
Career		8	8	18	1	19	0	0

Note: Stat categories that he didn't record any stats in are not included in the table, such as sacks and interceptions.

=== College ===
Year	Team	GP	Solo	Ast	Tot	TFL	Sck	Int	Yds	Avg	TD	PD	FF	FR
2016	Ohio State	11	11	10	21	0.0	0.0	1	0	0.0	0	0	0	0
2017	Ohio State	12	35	9	44	3.0	0.0	2	35	17.5	0	8	1	1
2018	Ohio State	13	31	9	40	0.0	0.0	1	1	1.0	0	6	0	0
2019	Ohio State	11	27	8	35	1.0	0.0	1	96	96.0	1	8	1	0
Career		47	104	36	140	4.0	0.0	5	132	26.4	1	22	2	1
