= J. K. Dobbins =

American football player (born 1998)

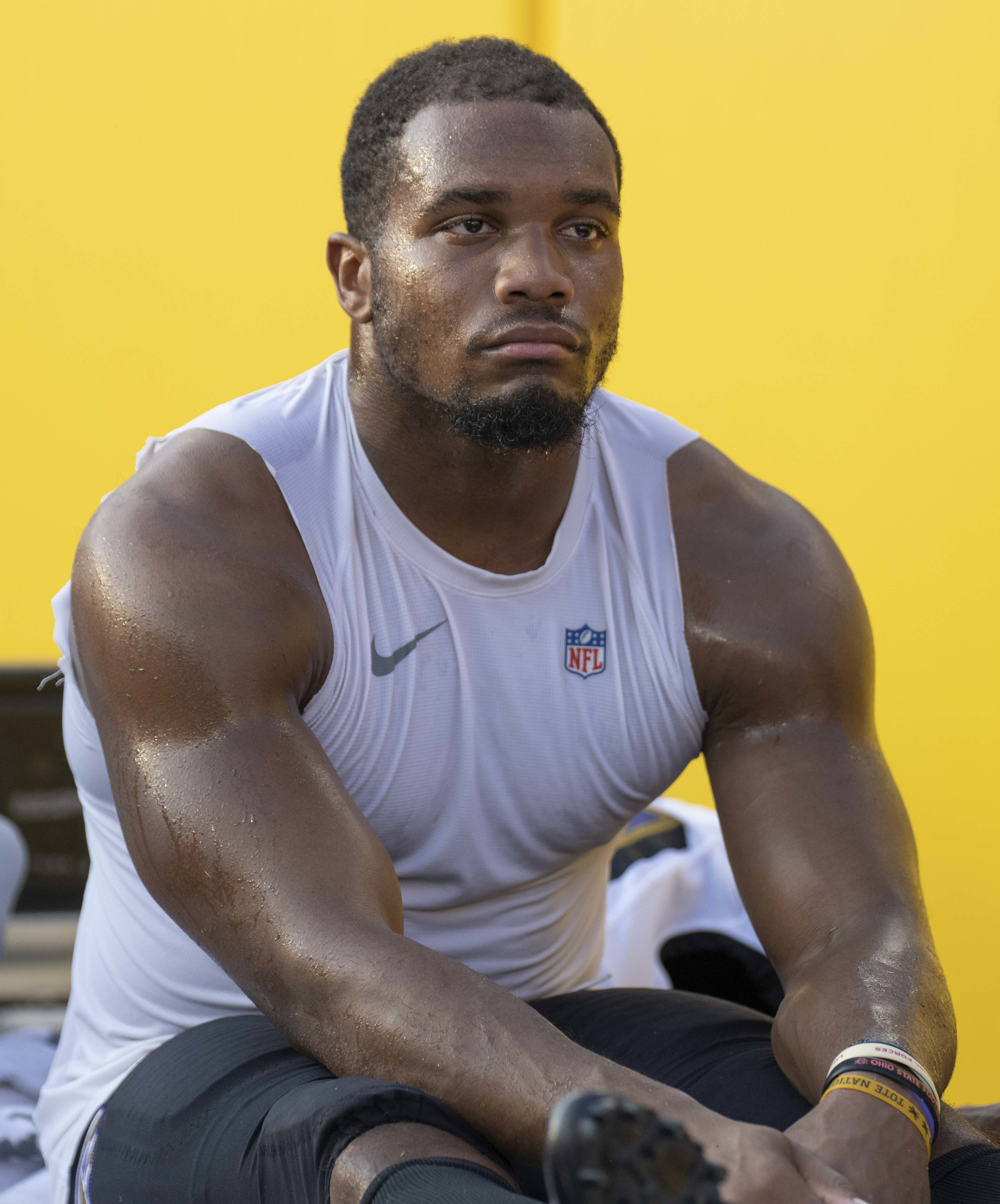
- Dobbins with the Baltimore Ravens in 2021

No. 27 – Denver Broncos
- Position: Running back
- Roster status: Active

Personal information
- Born: December 17, 1998 (age 27); Houston, Texas, U.S.
- Listed height: 5 ft 10 in (1.78 m)
- Listed weight: 212 lb (96 kg)

Career information
- High school: La Grange (La Grange, Texas)
- College: Ohio State (2017–2019)
- NFL draft: 2020: 2nd round, 55th overall pick

Career history
- Baltimore Ravens (2020–2023); Los Angeles Chargers (2024); Denver Broncos (2025–present)

Awards and highlights
- Earl Campbell Tyler Rose Award (2019); First-team All-American (2019); First-team All-Big Ten (2019); Second-team All-Big Ten (2017, 2018)

Career NFL statistics as of Week 6, 2026
- Rushing yards: 3,294
- Rushing average: 5.0
- Rushing touchdowns: 27
- Receptions: 78
- Receiving yards: 394
- Receiving touchdowns: 1
- Stats at Pro Football Reference

J'Kaylin Dobbins (born December 17, 1998) is an American professional football running back for the Denver Broncos of the National Football League (NFL). He played college football for the Ohio State Buckeyes and was selected by the Baltimore Ravens in the second round of the 2020 NFL draft. He spent four seasons with the Ravens before joining the Los Angeles Chargers for the 2024 NFL season.

== Early life ==
Dobbins' mother Mya was 18 when she was pregnant with him. She considered aborting the fetus, but changed her mind after meeting with a doctor at an abortion clinic.

Dobbins attended La Grange High School in La Grange, Texas. During his high school football career, he had 5,149 yards and 74 touchdowns. He rushed for 2,243 yards and 37 touchdowns as a sophomore and 2,740 yards and 35 touchdowns as a junior. He played in only one game his senior year due to an injury. Despite his injury, Dobbins was a highly-touted four-star prospect, and received over twenty scholarship offers from Power Five conferences. All major recruiting websites ranked him in the top five among his 2017 class for his position and in the top ten for players from the state of Texas. 247Sports and ESPN.com ranked him as a top-50 recruit in the country. (Note: ESPN only ranks the top 300 players in a given recruiting class.) After some speculation that he would sign with Texas or Oklahoma, Dobbins committed to Ohio State University to play college football.

College recruiting
| Name | Hometown | School | Height | Weight | 40^{‡} | Commit date |
|---|---|---|---|---|---|---|
| J.K. Dobbins; RB | Houston, TX | La Grange (TX) | 5 ft 9.5 in (1.77 m) | 196 lb (89 kg) | 4.44 | Mar 6, 2016 |
| J.K. Dobbins; RB | Recruit ratings: Rivals: 247Sports: ESPN: (86) | | | | | |
Overall recruit ranking: Rivals: 66 247Sports: 46 ESPN: 44
Note: In many cases, Scout, Rivals, 247Sports, On3, and ESPN may conflict in their listings of height and weight.; In these cases, the average was taken. ESPN grades are on a 100-point scale.; Sources: "J.K. Dobbins". Rivals.; "2017 Team Ranking". Rivals.com.; "J. K. Dobbins". 247Sports.

== College career ==
=== 2017 season ===
In his first game at Ohio State in 2017, Dobbins rushed for 181 yards on 29 carries against Indiana. Dobbins had earned the start over the returning 2016 Big Ten Freshman of the Year Mike Weber who was recovering from an injury. In his first season, he eclipsed 100 rushing yards in six games and became only the fourth freshman in Ohio State history to eclipse the 1,000-yard rushing mark in a season. During the 2017 Big Ten Football Championship Game, Dobbins overtook Maurice Clarett for the most rushing yards by a Freshman with his 174-yard, MVP performance. During a 24–7 Cotton Bowl Classic win against USC, Dobbins set the Freshman rushing record at 1,403 yards.

=== 2018 season ===
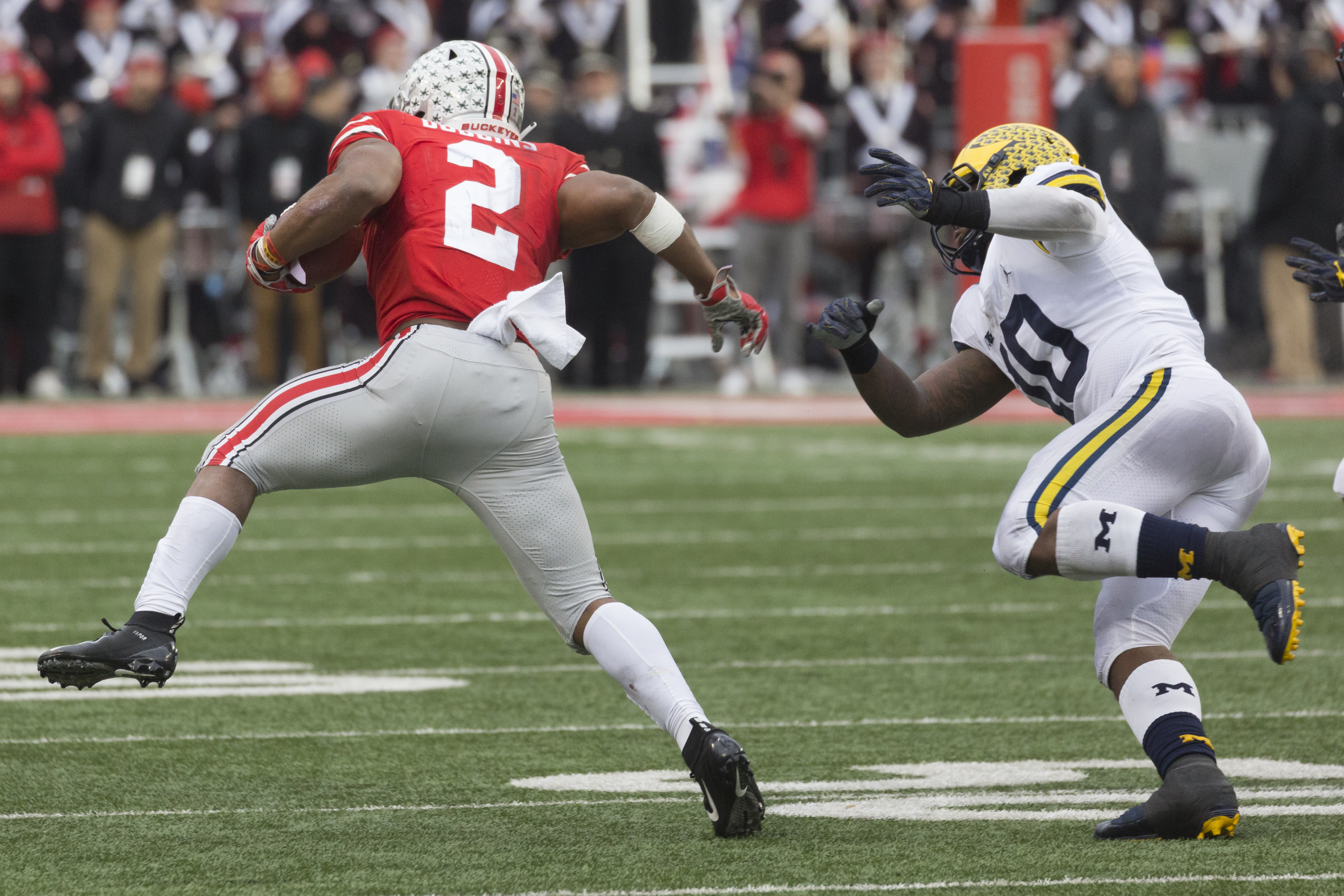
Dobbins with Ohio State in 2018

Despite a record-setting 2017 season, Dobbins' would once again split time with Weber during his Sophomore year. The time split paired with Dwayne Haskins' award-winning performance at quarterback led to a decrease in productivity for Dobbins. He ended the season with 1,053 yards rushing but remained the team's leading rusher. Notably, he had his first 200+ yard rushing game against Maryland.

=== 2019 season ===
In 2019, Dobbins would enter his junior season with high expectations. These expectations were met when he went on to gain 100+ yards in ten games during the season. This included a four-touchdown performance against Michigan that stemmed from 211 yards rushing. He finished his season as the only Buckeye in history to rush for more than 2,000 yards in a season, passing Eddie George. Dobbins was a Doak Walker Award finalist and finished sixth for the Heisman Trophy. He was named First-team All-Big Ten and First-team All-American as an All-Purpose player by the Football Writers Association of America.

On December 30, 2019, Dobbins announced his intention to forgo his senior season and enter the 2020 NFL draft. He left Ohio State with a total of 4,459 yards rushing, which makes him second all time. He won four Big Ten Offensive Player of the Week Awards, three Big Ten titles and two bowl games.

== Professional career ==
Pre-draft measurables
| Height | Weight | Arm length | Hand span | Wingspan | Bench press |
|---|---|---|---|---|---|
| 5 ft 9 1/2 in (1.77 m) | 209 lb (95 kg) | 29 3/4 in (0.76 m) | 9 1/2 in (0.24 m) | 6 ft 1 1/2 in (1.87 m) | 23 reps |
All values from NFL Combine

=== Baltimore Ravens ===
==== 2020 season ====
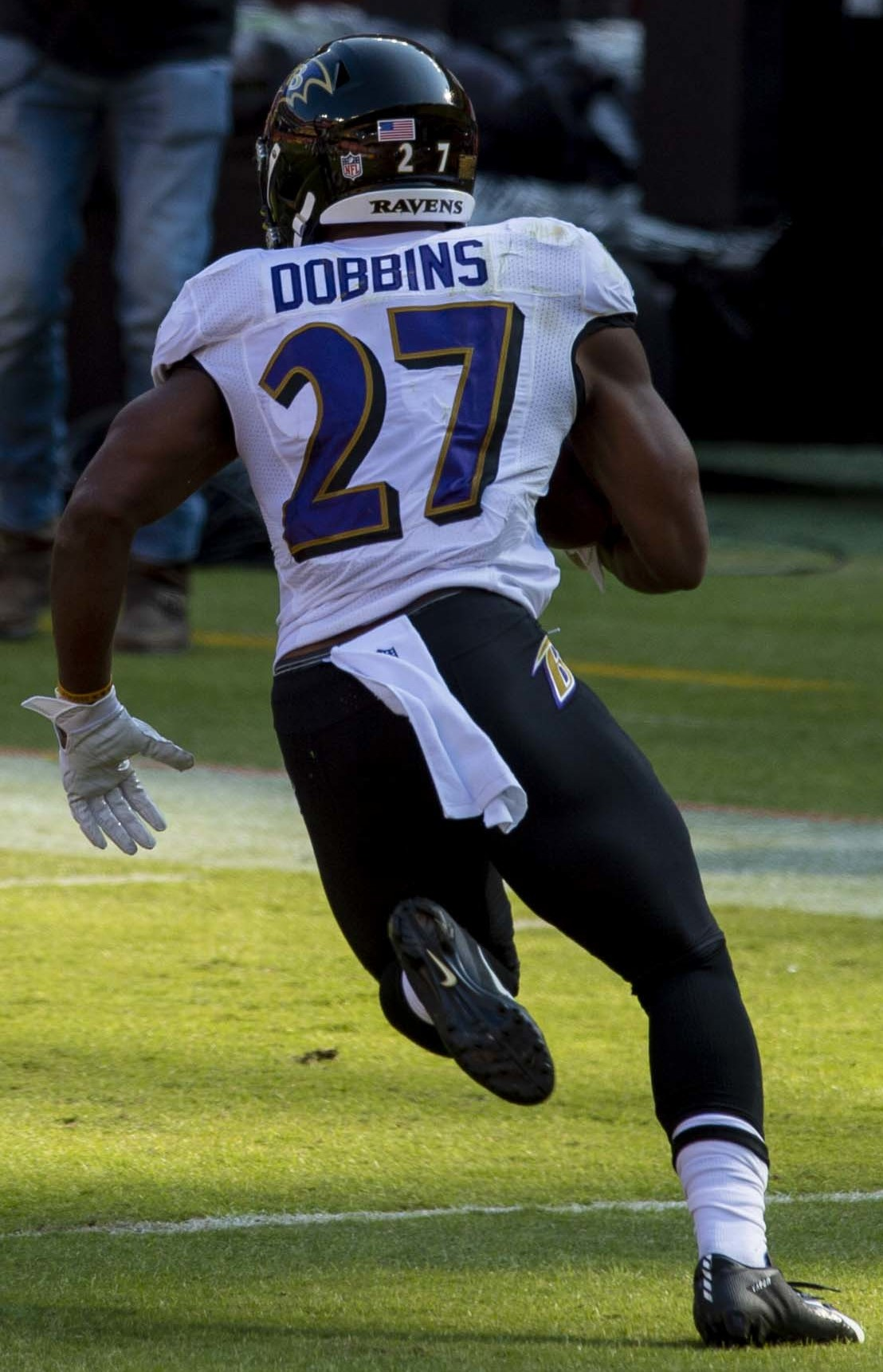
Dobbins in 2020

Dobbins was selected in the second round of the 2020 NFL draft with the 55th overall pick by the Baltimore Ravens. The Ravens previously traded tight end Hayden Hurst to the Atlanta Falcons to acquire the pick used on Dobbins. In his NFL debut against the Cleveland Browns on September 13, 2020, Dobbins had seven carries for 22 yards and scored his first two career rushing touchdowns in a 38–6 victory in Week 1. In Week 8 against the Pittsburgh Steelers, he had his first 100-yard rushing game with 15 carries for 113 rushing yards in the 24–28 loss. He was placed on the reserve/COVID-19 list by the team on November 23, 2020, and activated on December 4. Dobbins first start in his career came in a Week 16 27–13 win over the New York Giants. He finished the game with 11 carries for 77 yards and a touchdown. In Week 17 against the Cincinnati Bengals, Dobbins rushed for 160 yards and 2 touchdowns during the 38–3 win.

==== 2021 season ====
Dobbins suffered a torn ACL in the final preseason game against the Washington Football Team on August 28, 2021, and was placed on injured reserve a few days later. Dobbins did not play the entire 2021 season and was put into rehab during his time off.

==== 2022 season ====
Dobbins was cleared for full-time starter duty after missing the first two weeks of the season. However, he suffered another knee injury in Week 6 and was placed on injured reserve on October 22, 2022. He was activated from injured reserve on December 10, 2022. In Week 14 against the Steelers, he had 15 carries for 120 yards and a touchdown in the 16–14 win. In Week 15 against the Browns, he had 13 carries for 125 yards in the 13–3 loss. In the 2022 season, Dobbins appeared in and started eight games. He finished with 92 carries for 520 rushing yards and two rushing touchdowns. In the Wild Card Round loss to the Bengals, he had 105 scrimmage yards and a receiving touchdown.

==== 2023 season ====
In the Week 1 game against the Houston Texans, Dobbins finished with 22 rushing yards and a touchdown before leaving the game with an injury. Immediately thereafter, it was revealed that Dobbins had suffered a torn Achilles tendon, which prematurely ended his season. He was placed on injured reserve on September 12, 2023.

=== Los Angeles Chargers ===
On April 18, 2024, Dobbins signed a one-year contract with the Los Angeles Chargers. In their 2024 season opener under new head coach Jim Harbaugh, he rushed 10 times for 135 yards and a touchdown in a 22–10 win over the Las Vegas Raiders. In Week 2, he rushed for 131 yards and a touchdown in the 26–3 win over the Carolina Panthers. In Week 12, Dobbins suffered a MCL sprain during the matchup against Baltimore Ravens, he was placed on injured reserve on November 30, ahead of the Week 13 matchup against Atlanta Falcons. He was activated on December 27. He finished the 2024 season with 195 carries for 905 yards and nine touchdowns.

=== Denver Broncos ===
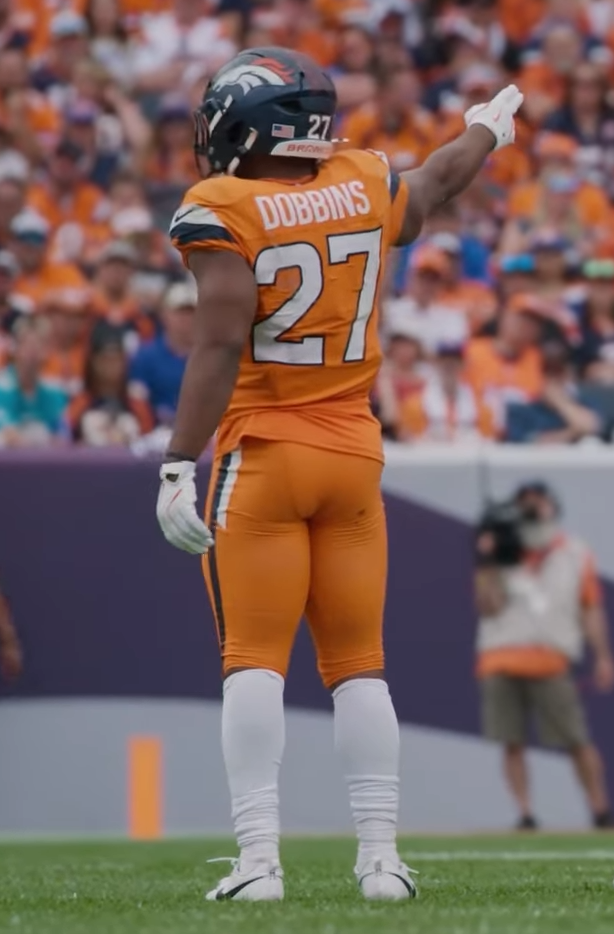
Dobbins with the Denver Broncos in 2025

On June 11, 2025, Dobbins signed a one-year, $5.25 million contract with the Denver Broncos. In Week 4 against the Cincinnati Bengals, Dobbins rushed for 101 yards, becoming the Broncos' first 100-yard rusher in their past 38 games (the last being Latavius Murray in 2022). In Week 10, Dobbins suffered a Lisfranc injury on a hip-drop tackle by Raiders defensive end Tyree Wilson. Following foot surgery, he was placed on season-ending injured reserve on November 15. He finished the 2025 season with 153 carries for 772 yards and four touchdowns.

On March 10, 2026, Dobbins signed a two-year, $16 million contract extension with the Broncos.

== Career statistics ==
=== NFL ===
Regular season
| Year | Team | Games | | Rushing | | | | | Receiving | | | | | Fumbles | |
| Year | Team | GP | GS | Att | Yds | Avg | Lng | TD | Rec | Yds | Avg | Lng | TD | Fum | Lost |
|---|---|---|---|---|---|---|---|---|---|---|---|---|---|---|---|
| 2020 | BAL | 15 | 1 | 134 | 805 | 6.0 | 72T | 9 | 18 | 120 | 6.7 | 19 | 0 | 2 | 0 |
| 2021 | BAL | 0 | 0 | Did not play due to injury | | | | | | | | | | | |
| 2022 | BAL | 8 | 8 | 92 | 520 | 5.7 | 44 | 2 | 7 | 42 | 6.0 | 20 | 1 | 0 | 0 |
| 2023 | BAL | 1 | 1 | 8 | 22 | 2.8 | 4 | 1 | 2 | 15 | 7.5 | 10 | 0 | 0 | 0 |
| 2024 | LAC | 13 | 11 | 195 | 905 | 4.6 | 61 | 9 | 32 | 153 | 4.8 | 15 | 0 | 0 | 0 |
| 2025 | DEN | 10 | 9 | 153 | 772 | 5.0 | 41 | 4 | 11 | 37 | 3.4 | 9 | 0 | 0 | 0 |
| 2026 | DEN | 6 | 6 | 81 | 270 | 3.3 | 17 | 2 | 8 | 27 | 3.4 | 7 | 0 | 1 | 0 |
| Career | | 53 | 36 | 663 | 3,294 | 5.0 | 72T | 27 | 78 | 394 | 5.1 | 20 | 1 | 3 | 0 |

Postseason
| Year | Team | Games | | Rushing | | | | | Receiving | | | | | Fumbles | |
| Year | Team | GP | GS | Att | Yds | Avg | Lng | TD | Rec | Yds | Avg | Lng | TD | Fum | Lost |
|---|---|---|---|---|---|---|---|---|---|---|---|---|---|---|---|
| 2020 | BAL | 2 | 1 | 19 | 85 | 4.5 | 13 | 1 | 4 | 45 | 11.3 | 31 | 0 | 0 | 0 |
| 2022 | BAL | 1 | 1 | 13 | 62 | 4.8 | 15 | 0 | 4 | 43 | 10.8 | 27 | 1 | 0 | 0 |
| 2023 | BAL | 0 | 0 | Did not play due to injury | | | | | | | | | | | |
| 2024 | LAC | 1 | 1 | 9 | 26 | 2.9 | 8 | 0 | 0 | 0 | 0 | 0 | 0 | 0 | 0 |
| 2025 | DEN | 0 | 0 | Did not play due to injury | | | | | | | | | | | |
| Career | | 4 | 3 | 41 | 173 | 4.2 | 15 | 1 | 8 | 88 | 11.0 | 31 | 1 | 0 | 0 |

=== College ===
| Year | Team | Rushing | | | | Receiving | | | |
| Year | Team | Att | Yds | Avg | TD | Rec | Yds | Avg | TD |
|---|---|---|---|---|---|---|---|---|---|
| 2017 | Ohio State | 194 | 1,403 | 7.2 | 7 | 22 | 135 | 6.1 | 1 |
| 2018 | Ohio State | 230 | 1,053 | 4.6 | 10 | 26 | 263 | 10.1 | 2 |
| 2019 | Ohio State | 301 | 2,003 | 6.7 | 21 | 23 | 247 | 10.7 | 2 |
| Career | | 725 | 4,459 | 6.2 | 38 | 71 | 645 | 9.1 | 5 |

== Personal life ==
Growing up in Texas, in a city that is primarily hispanic, Dobbins has developed a distinct interest in the Spanish language and Latin American culture.
