= Jaelen Gill =

American football player (born 1999)

No. 87 – Hamilton Tiger-Cats
- Position: Wide receiver
- Roster status: Active
- CFL status: American

Personal information
- Born: November 17, 1999 (age 26); Westerville, Ohio, U.S.
- Listed height: 5 ft 11 in (1.80 m)
- Listed weight: 189 lb (86 kg)

Career information
- High school: Westerville South (Westerville, Ohio)
- College: Ohio State (2018–2019); Boston College (2020–2022); Fresno State (2023)
- NFL draft: 2024: undrafted

Career history
- Los Angeles Chargers (2024)*; Cleveland Browns (2024)*; San Antonio Brahmas (2025)*; Cleveland Browns (2025)*; Hamilton Tiger-Cats (2026–present)
- * Offseason or practice squad member only
- Stats at Pro Football Reference

Jaelen Gill (born November 17, 1999) is an American professional football wide receiver for the Hamilton Tiger-Cats of the Canadian Football League (CFL). He played college football for the Boston College Eagles, Fresno State Bulldogs, and Ohio State Buckeyes.

== Early life ==
Gill attended Westerville South High School in Westerville, Ohio. He was rated as a four-star recruit and committed to play college football for the Ohio State Buckeyes over offers from schools such as Notre Dame, Michigan, UCLA, Tennessee and USC.

== College career ==
=== Ohio State ===
Gill took a redshirt season in 2018, during which he switched from running back to wide receiver. In week 3 of the 2019 season, he notched his first career touchdown on a 32-yard reception in a win over Rutgers. Gill finished the year with six receptions for 51 yards and a touchdown and entered his name into the NCAA transfer portal following the season.

=== Boston College ===
Gill transferred to play for the Boston College Eagles. In 2020, he hauled in 29 receptions for 435 yards and a touchdown. In 2021, Gill tallied 24 receptions for 269 yards and a touchdown for the Golden Eagles. In 2022, he tallied 27 receptions for 388 yards. After the season, Gill once again entered his name into the NCAA transfer portal.

=== Fresno State ===
Gill transferred to play for the Fresno State Bulldogs. In his one season with the Bulldogs, he notched 48 receptions for 516 yards and six touchdowns.

== Professional career ==
Pre-draft measurables
| Height | Weight | Arm length | Hand span | Wingspan | 40-yard dash | 10-yard split | 20-yard split | 20-yard shuttle | Three-cone drill | Vertical jump | Broad jump | Bench press |
|---|---|---|---|---|---|---|---|---|---|---|---|---|
| 5 ft 11 1/2 in (1.82 m) | 189 lb (86 kg) | 30 5/8 in (0.78 m) | 9 1/8 in (0.23 m) | 6 ft 2 1/4 in (1.89 m) | 4.52 s | 1.60 s | 2.65 s | 4.36 s | 7.09 s | 34.0 in (0.86 m) | 9 ft 11 in (3.02 m) | 15 reps |
All values from Pro Day

=== Los Angeles Chargers ===
After not being selected in the 2024 NFL draft, Gill signed with the Los Angeles Chargers as an undrafted free agent. However, he was released during final roster cuts.

=== Cleveland Browns ===
On December 10, 2024, Gill signed to the Cleveland Browns practice squad.

=== San Antonio Brahmas ===
On March 12, 2025, Gill signed with the San Antonio Brahmas of the United Football League (UFL). He was released on March 20.

=== Cleveland Browns (second stint) ===
On June 4, 2025, Gill signed with the Cleveland Browns. On July 22, Gill was waived by the Browns with a non-football injury designation.

=== Hamilton Tiger-Cats ===
On April 7, 2026, Gill signed with the Hamilton Tiger-Cats of the Canadian Football League (CFL).
