= Malik Harrison =

American football player (born 1998)

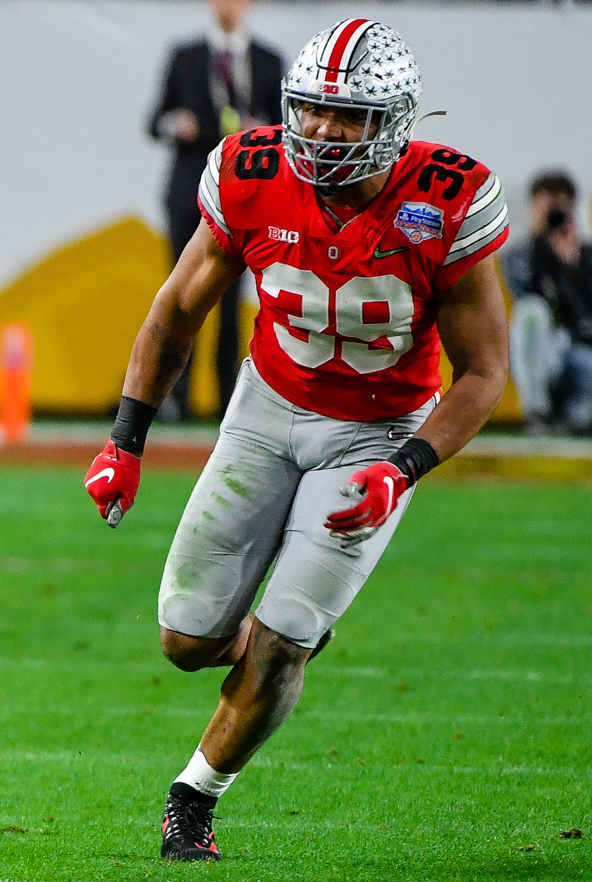
- Harrison with the Ohio State Buckeyes in 2019

No. 54 – New York Giants
- Position: Linebacker
- Roster status: Active

Personal information
- Born: March 5, 1998 (age 28); Columbus, Ohio, U.S.
- Listed height: 6 ft 3 in (1.91 m)
- Listed weight: 247 lb (112 kg)

Career information
- High school: Walnut Ridge (Columbus)
- College: Ohio State (2016–2019)
- NFL draft: 2020: 3rd round, 98th overall pick

Career history
- Baltimore Ravens (2020–2024); Pittsburgh Steelers (2025); New York Giants (2026–present)

Awards and highlights
- First-team All-Big Ten (2019)

Career NFL statistics as of Week 5, 2026
- Total tackles: 217
- Sacks: 2
- Fumble recoveries: 1
- Pass deflections: 1
- Stats at Pro Football Reference

Malik Harrison (born March 5, 1998) is an American professional football linebacker for the New York Giants of the National Football League (NFL). He played college football for the Ohio State Buckeyes and was selected by the Baltimore Ravens in the third round of the 2020 NFL draft.

== Early life ==
Harrison attended Walnut Ridge High School in Columbus, Ohio, where he played football and basketball. On the football field, he switched between quarterback, wide receiver, running back, linebacker, and safety. In 2015, his senior season, he rushed for 897 yards and 15 touchdowns while passing for 1,161 yards and eight touchdowns alongside compiling five sacks and forty tackles. He committed to play college football at Ohio State University following his senior season.

== College career ==
In 2016, Harrison's freshman year at Ohio State, he appeared in 12 games. As a sophomore in 2017, he appeared in all 14 of Ohio State's games, compiling 36 tackles and two sacks.

In 2018, Harrison's junior season, he became a starter, and was tied for first on the team in tackles with 81 alongside adding 8.5 tackles for loss. He earned All-Big Ten Conference honorable mention.

As a senior in 2019, Harrison again led Ohio State in tackles, recorded 4.5 sacks, and was named first-team All-Big Ten.

== Professional career ==
Pre-draft measurables
Height	Weight	Arm length	Hand span	Wingspan	40-yard dash	10-yard split	20-yard split	20-yard shuttle	Three-cone drill	Vertical jump	Broad jump
6 ft 2 5/8 in (1.90 m)	247 lb (112 kg)	32 3/4 in (0.83 m)	10 1/4 in (0.26 m)	6 ft 7 3/8 in (2.02 m)	4.66 s	1.62 s	2.73 s	4.32 s	6.83 s	36.0 in (0.91 m)	10 ft 2 in (3.10 m)
All values from NFL Combine

=== Baltimore Ravens ===
Harrison was selected by the Baltimore Ravens in the third round (98th overall) of the 2020 NFL draft. He signed his four-year rookie contract with the team on July 13, 2020. He was placed on the reserve/COVID-19 list by the team on November 3, and activated four days later.

On October 31, 2021, Harrison suffered a non-life-threatening injury after being shot in the left calf outside a nightclub in Cleveland. He was placed on the reserve/non-football injury list the following day. He was activated on November 27.

On March 13, 2024, Harrison signed a one-year contract extension with the Ravens.

=== Pittsburgh Steelers ===
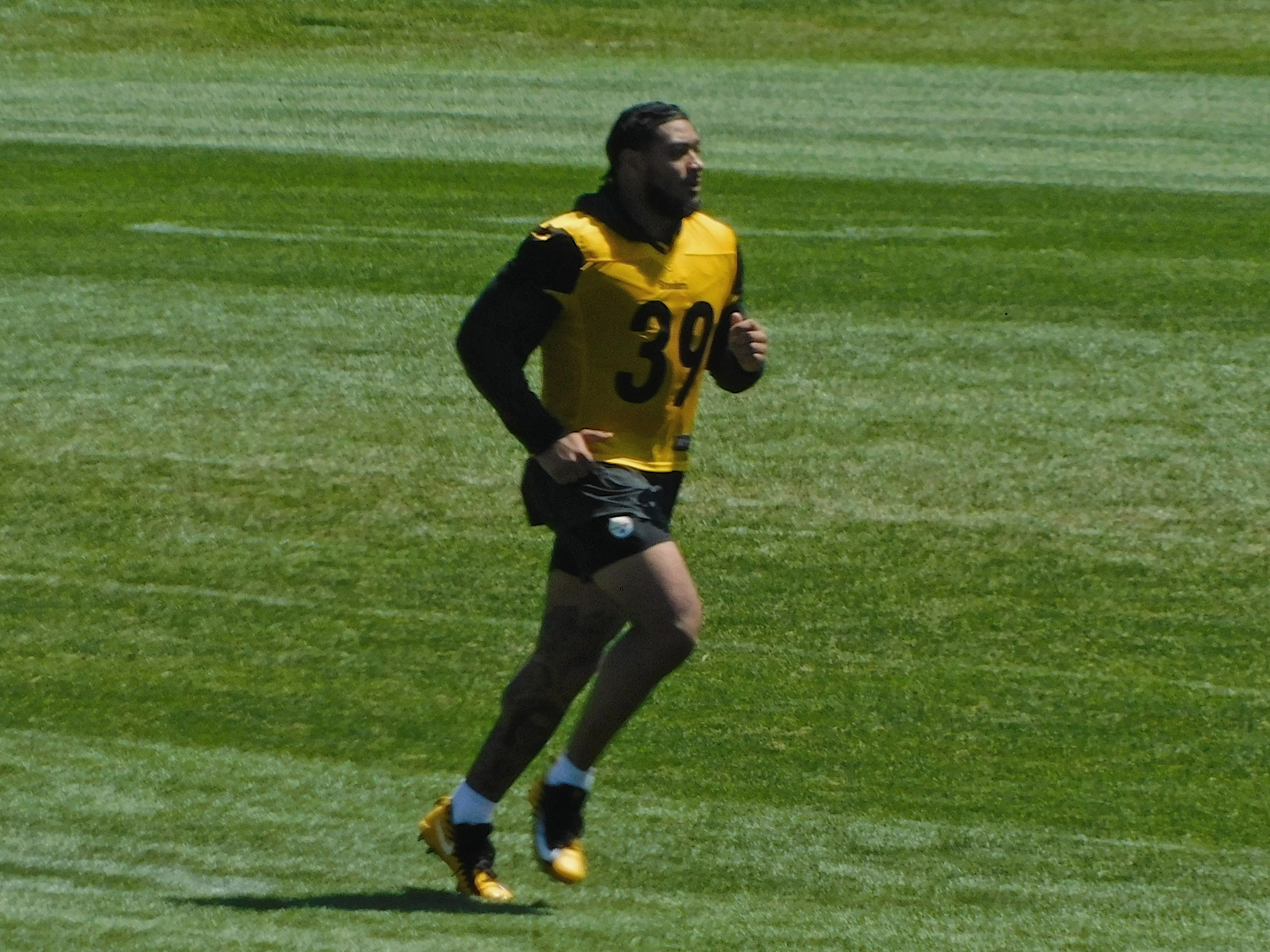
Harrison during training camp in 2026

On March 13, 2025, Harrison signed a two-year, $10 million contract with the Pittsburgh Steelers. On September 10, Harrison was placed on injured reserve with a knee injury. He was activated on November 1, ahead of the team's Week 9 matchup against the Indianapolis Colts.

On August 31, 2026, Harrison was waived by the Steelers as a part of final roster cuts.

=== New York Giants ===
On September 3, 2026, Harrison was signed to the New York Giants' practice squad. On September 12, Harrison was elevated ahead of the team's Week 1 game against the Dallas Cowboys. On September 21, he was elevated again ahead of a Week 2 matchup against the Los Angeles Rams. On September 26, Harrison was elevated for his third and final time ahead of Week 3 against the Tennessee Titans. On October 13, Harrison was signed to the active roster.

== NFL career statistics ==
Legend
	Led the league
**Bold**	Career high

=== Regular season ===
Year	Team	Games		Tackles					Interceptions						Fumbles				
Year	Team	GP	GS	Cmb	Solo	Ast	Sck	TFL	Int	Yds	Avg	Lng	TD	PD	FF	Fmb	FR	Yds	TD
2020	BAL	16	6	44	**26**	18	0.0	1	0	0	0.0	0	0	**1**	0	0	0	0	0
2021	BAL	14	5	25	14	11	0.0	2	0	0	0.0	0	0	0	0	0	0	0	0
2022	BAL	17	8	31	20	11	0.0	1	0	0	0.0	0	0	0	0	0	0	0	0
2023	BAL	14	8	20	13	7	0.0	0	0	0	0.0	0	0	0	0	0	0	0	0
2024	BAL	15	7	**54**	22	**32**	**2.0**	**3**	0	0	0.0	0	0	0	0	0	0	0	0
2025	PIT	11	9	41	25	16	0.0	2	0	0	0.0	0	0	0	0	0	0	0	0
Career		87	43	215	120	95	2.0	9	0	0	0.0	0	0	1	0	0	0	0	0

=== Postseason ===
Year	Team	Games		Tackles					Interceptions						Fumbles				
Year	Team	GP	GS	Cmb	Solo	Ast	Sck	TFL	Int	Yds	Avg	Lng	TD	PD	FF	Fmb	FR	Yds	TD
2020	BAL	2	1	4	0	4	0.0	0	0	0	0.0	0	0	0	0	0	0	0	0
2022	BAL	1	0	0	0	0	0.0	0	0	0	0.0	0	0	0	0	0	0	0	0
2023	BAL	2	1	8	2	**6**	0.0	0	0	0	0.0	0	0	0	**1**	0	0	0	0
2024	BAL	2	2	**11**	**7**	4	0.0	**1**	0	0	0.0	0	0	0	0	0	0	0	0
2025	PIT	1	1	2	1	1	0.0	0	0	0	0.0	0	0	0	0	0	0	0	0
Career		8	5	25	10	15	0.0	1	0	0	0.0	0	0	0	1	0	0	0	0

== Personal life ==
Harrison was born to parents Donetta and Charles.
