= Jake Hausmann =

American football player (born 1997)

Profile
- Position: Tight end

Personal information
- Born: August 12, 1997 (age 29); Cincinnati, Ohio
- Listed height: 6 ft 4 in (1.93 m)
- Listed weight: 245 lb (111 kg)

Career information
- High school: Archbishop Moeller (Cincinnati)
- College: Ohio State
- NFL draft: 2021: undrafted

Career history
- Detroit Lions (2021)*; New York Giants (2021)*; Seattle Seahawks (2022)*; Washington Commanders (2022)*
- * Offseason or practice squad member only
- Stats at Pro Football Reference

Jacob Hausmann (born August 12, 1997) is an American former football tight end. He played college football at Ohio State and was signed as an undrafted free agent by the Detroit Lions in 2021.

== College career ==
Hausmann was ranked as a four–star recruit by 247Sports.com coming out of high school. He committed to Ohio State on January 25, 2015.

== Professional career ==
=== Detroit Lions ===
Hausmann was signed as an undrafted free agent by the Detroit Lions on May 1, 2021. He was waived on August 6, 2021.

=== New York Giants ===
On August 7, 2021, Hausmann was claimed off waivers by the New York Giants. He was waived on August 31, 2021, and re-signed to the practice squad the next day. He was released on October 19, but re-signed on October 25. On November 5, 2021, Hausmann was released from the practice squad. On November 24, 2021, Hausmann was signed back to the practice squad. He signed a reserve/futures contract with the Giants on January 10, 2022. He was waived on May 10, 2022.

=== Seattle Seahawks ===
Hausmann signed with the Seattle Seahawks on July 27, 2022, and was waived on August 5, 2022.

=== Washington Commanders ===
Hausmann signed with the Washington Commanders on August 22, 2022, but was released on August 30.
