= C. J. Saunders =

American football player (born 1996)

Profile
- Position: Wide receiver

Personal information
- Born: September 15, 1996 (age 30); Dublin, Ohio, U.S.
- Listed height: 5 ft 10 in (1.78 m)
- Listed weight: 190 lb (86 kg)

Career information
- High school: Dublin Coffman (OH)
- College: Ohio State (2015–2019)
- NFL draft: 2020: undrafted

Career history

Playing
- Carolina Panthers (2021–2022); Atlanta Falcons (2023)*
- * Offseason or practice squad member only

Coaching
- Ohio State (2020) Graduate assistant

Career NFL statistics
- Receptions: 2
- Receiving yards: 11
- Stats at Pro Football Reference

C.J. Saunders (born September 15, 1996) is an American professional football wide receiver. He played college football at Ohio State.

== College career ==
Saunders was unranked by 247Sports.com coming out of high school. He committed to Ohio State as a walk-on before the 2015 season. After getting the opportunity to play sporadically for the team, he applied for and was denied a sixth year of eligibility.

== Professional career ==
Pre-draft measurables
| Height | Weight | Arm length | Hand span | 40-yard dash | 10-yard split | 20-yard split | 20-yard shuttle | Three-cone drill | Vertical jump | Broad jump | Bench press |
|---|---|---|---|---|---|---|---|---|---|---|---|
| 5 ft 9 3/4 in (1.77 m) | 179 lb (81 kg) | 31 1/4 in (0.79 m) | 9 5/8 in (0.24 m) | 4.70 s | 1.62 s | 2.72 s | 4.15 s | 7.10 s | 34.5 in (0.88 m) | 9 ft 5 in (2.87 m) | 8 reps |
All values from Pro Day

After spending a year as a graduate assistant at Ohio State, Saunders had a mini-camp tryout with the Atlanta Falcons in May 2021.

=== Carolina Panthers ===
On June 1, 2021, Saunders signed with the Carolina Panthers. He was waived on August 31, 2021, and re-signed to the practice squad the next day. He signed a reserve/future contract with the Panthers on January 10, 2022.

On August 30, 2022, Saunders was waived by the Panthers and re-signed to the practice squad. He signed a reserve/future contract on January 9, 2023. He was released on August 26, 2023.

=== Atlanta Falcons ===
On August 31, 2023, Saunders was signed to the Atlanta Falcons practice squad. He was released on October 11, 2023.

== Coaching career ==
Saunders coached as a graduate assistant at Ohio State in 2020 after he was denied a sixth–year of eligibility.
