= Chris Chugunov =

American football player (born 1996)

No. 4
- Position: Quarterback

Personal information
- Born: September 12, 1996 (age 30); Skillman, New Jersey, U.S.
- Listed height: 6 ft 1 in (1.85 m)
- Listed weight: 208 lb (94 kg)

Career information
- High school: Montgomery (NJ) (Skillman, New Jersey)
- College: West Virginia (2015–2017); Ohio State (2018–2019)

Awards and highlights
- Big 12 Conference commissioner's honor roll (2017); Academic all-Big Ten (2018)
- Stats at ESPN

Chris Chugunov (born September 12, 1996) is an American former college football quarterback for Ohio State. He played high school football at Montgomery High School in Skillman, New Jersey.

== Early life ==
Playing at Montgomery High School, Chugunov committed to West Virginia in 2014. He finished high school career with 6,308 passing yards, 47 touchdowns and 16 interceptions with five games of 300 yards or more and was ranked the No. 27 player in New Jersey by ESPN.

Chugunov chose West Virginia over Western Michigan, Towson, Delaware and William & Mary.

== College career ==
In 2015, Chugunov redshirted. As a redshirt freshman at West Virginia, Chugunov played in three games, completing only two passes. His debut game was against Missouri in 2016. The following year, he served as the primary backup behind Will Grier. He got the starting nod during two games during that season against Texas and Oklahoma.

Following the 2017 season, Chugunov decided to transfer to Ohio State, after he had graduated from WVU with a bachelor's in business.

Season	Games		Record	Passing							Rushing			
Season	G	GS	Record	Comp	Att	Pct	Yards	TD	Int	Rate	Att	Yards	Avg	TD
West Virginia Mountaineers
2015	(redshirt) Redshirted													
2016	3	0	0–0	2	5	40.0	15	0	1	25.2	0	0	0.0	0
2017	5	2	0–2	43	90	47.7	536	3	2	104.4	7	−48	−6.9	0
Ohio State Buckeyes
2018	1	0	0–0	0	0	0	0	0	0	0.0	0	0	0.0	0
2019	9	0	0–0	26	43	60.5	286	6	0	165.6	4	−10	−2.5	0
Career	18	2	0–2	71	138	51.4	822	9	3	–	11	-48	-4.4	0
