= Al Washington (coach) =

American football player and coach (born 1984)

Miami Dolphins
- Title: Linebackers coach

Personal information
- Born: April 22, 1984 (age 42); Columbus, Ohio, U.S.
- Listed height: 6 ft 0 in (1.83 m)
- Listed weight: 284 lb (129 kg)

Career information
- Position: Defensive tackle
- High school: Bishop Watterson (Columbus, Ohio)
- College: Boston College (2002–2005)

Career history
- RPI (2007) Defensive line coach; NC State (2008) Graduate assistant; Slippery Rock (2009–2010) Defensive line coach; Elon (2011) Linebackers coach; Boston College (2012–2016); Assistant special teams coordinator & defensive line coach (2012); Running backs coach (2013–2015); Special teams coordinator & defensive line coach (2016); Cincinnati (2017) Defensive line coach; Michigan (2018) Linebackers coach; Ohio State (2019–2021) Linebackers coach; Notre Dame (2022–2025) Defensive line coach; Miami Dolphins (2026–present) Linebackers coach

Alvin Anthony Washington (born April 22, 1984) is an American football coach and former defensive tackle who is the linebackers coach for the Miami Dolphins of the National Football League (NFL). He played college football for the Boston College Eagles and previously coached for the Boston College Eagles, Cincinnati Bearcats, Michigan Wolverines, Ohio State Buckeyes, and Notre Dame Fighting Irish.

== Early career ==
Washington attended Bishop Watterson High School in Columbus, Ohio. Washington was the 2001 co-Defensive Player of the Year in Division II and led the Eagles to the state championship game.

Washington was a three-year starter and four-year letterwinner as a defensive tackle for Boston College, from 2002 to 2005.

Pre-draft measurables
Height	Weight	40-yard dash	20-yard shuttle	Three-cone drill	Vertical jump	Broad jump
6 ft 0 1/2 in (1.84 m)	284 lb (129 kg)	5.24 s	4.50 s	7.62 s	23.0 in (0.58 m)	8 ft 5 in (2.57 m)
All values from Pro Day

== Coaching career ==
=== Ohio State ===
Washington was hired by Ohio State on January 7, 2019, to be the new linebackers coach.

=== Notre Dame ===
On January 16, 2022, he was hired by Notre Dame to be the new defensive line coach and defensive run game coordinator, replacing Mike Elston, who left for the defensive line job at Michigan.

=== Miami Dolphins ===
In 2026, Washington switched to linebackers coach, replacing Max Bullough. However, before the season's start, on February 13, 2026, he was hired away to the Miami Dolphins to serve as the team's linebackers coach under new head coach Jeff Hafley.

== Personal life ==
Al Washington and his wife Melissa have one son named Michael and a daughter, Audrey.
