= Jeff Okudah =

American football player (born 1999)

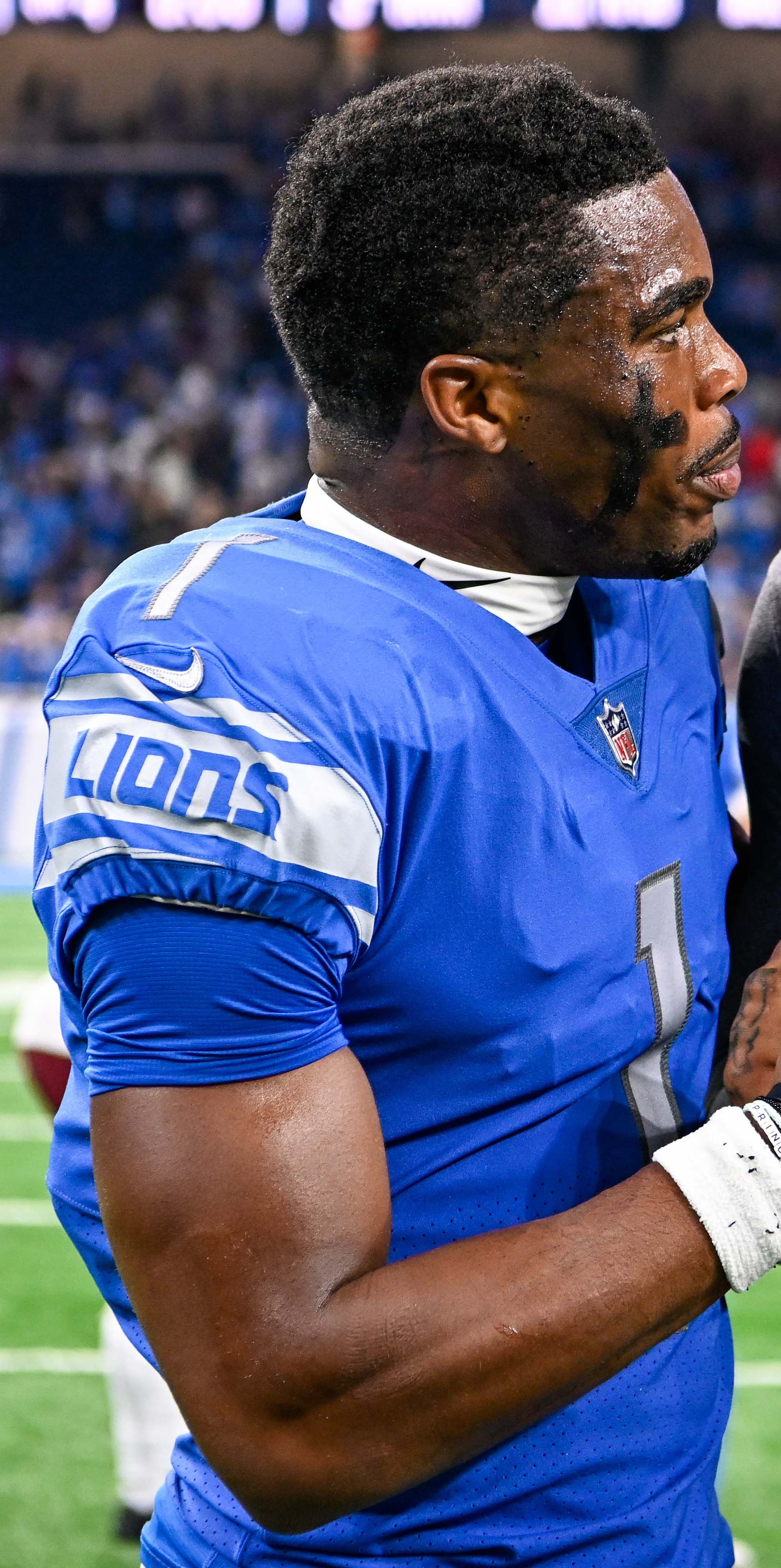
- Okudah with the Detroit Lions in 2022

Profile
- Position: Cornerback

Personal information
- Born: February 2, 1999 (age 27); Grand Prairie, Texas, U.S.
- Listed height: 6 ft 1 in (1.85 m)
- Listed weight: 205 lb (93 kg)

Career information
- High school: South Grand Prairie
- College: Ohio State (2017–2019)
- NFL draft: 2020: 1st round, 3rd overall pick

Career history
- Detroit Lions (2020–2022); Atlanta Falcons (2023); Houston Texans (2024); Minnesota Vikings (2025)

Awards and highlights
- Unanimous All-American (2019); First-team All-Big Ten (2019)

Career NFL statistics as of 2025
- Total tackles: 191
- Forced fumbles: 1
- Fumble recoveries: 1
- Pass deflections: 14
- Interceptions: 2
- Defensive touchdowns: 1
- Stats at Pro Football Reference

Jeffrey Chidera Okudah (born February 2, 1999) is an American professional football cornerback. He played college football for the Ohio State Buckeyes, earning unanimous All-American honors in 2019 before being selected by the Detroit Lions with the third overall pick in the 2020 NFL draft. Okudah has also played for the Atlanta Falcons, Houston Texans, and Minnesota Vikings in his career.

== Early life ==
Okudah was born in Grand Prairie, Texas to Nigerian parents. He attended South Grand Prairie High School in Grand Prairie, Texas. A five-star recruit, he committed to Ohio State University in January 2017.

== College career ==
As a true freshman at Ohio State in 2017, Okudah played in all 14 games and had 17 tackles. As a sophomore in 2018, he played in 13 games, recording 32 tackles. As a junior in 2019, he recorded his first career interception against the Miami Redhawks. As a junior in 2019, Okudah had 34 tackles, 9 passes defensed, and 3 interceptions. For his performance that season, he was unanimously named to the 2019 College Football All-America Team and was also named a finalist for the Jim Thorpe Award. Okudah decided to forgo his senior year by declaring for the 2020 NFL draft.

== Professional career ==
Pre-draft measurables
Height	Weight	Arm length	Hand span	Wingspan	40-yard dash	10-yard split	20-yard split	Vertical jump	Broad jump	Bench press
6 ft 1 1/8 in (1.86 m)	205 lb (93 kg)	32 5/8 in (0.83 m)	9 1/8 in (0.23 m)	6 ft 6 5/8 in (2.00 m)	4.48 s	1.60 s	2.65 s	41.0 in (1.04 m)	11 ft 3 in (3.43 m)	11 reps
All values from NFL Combine

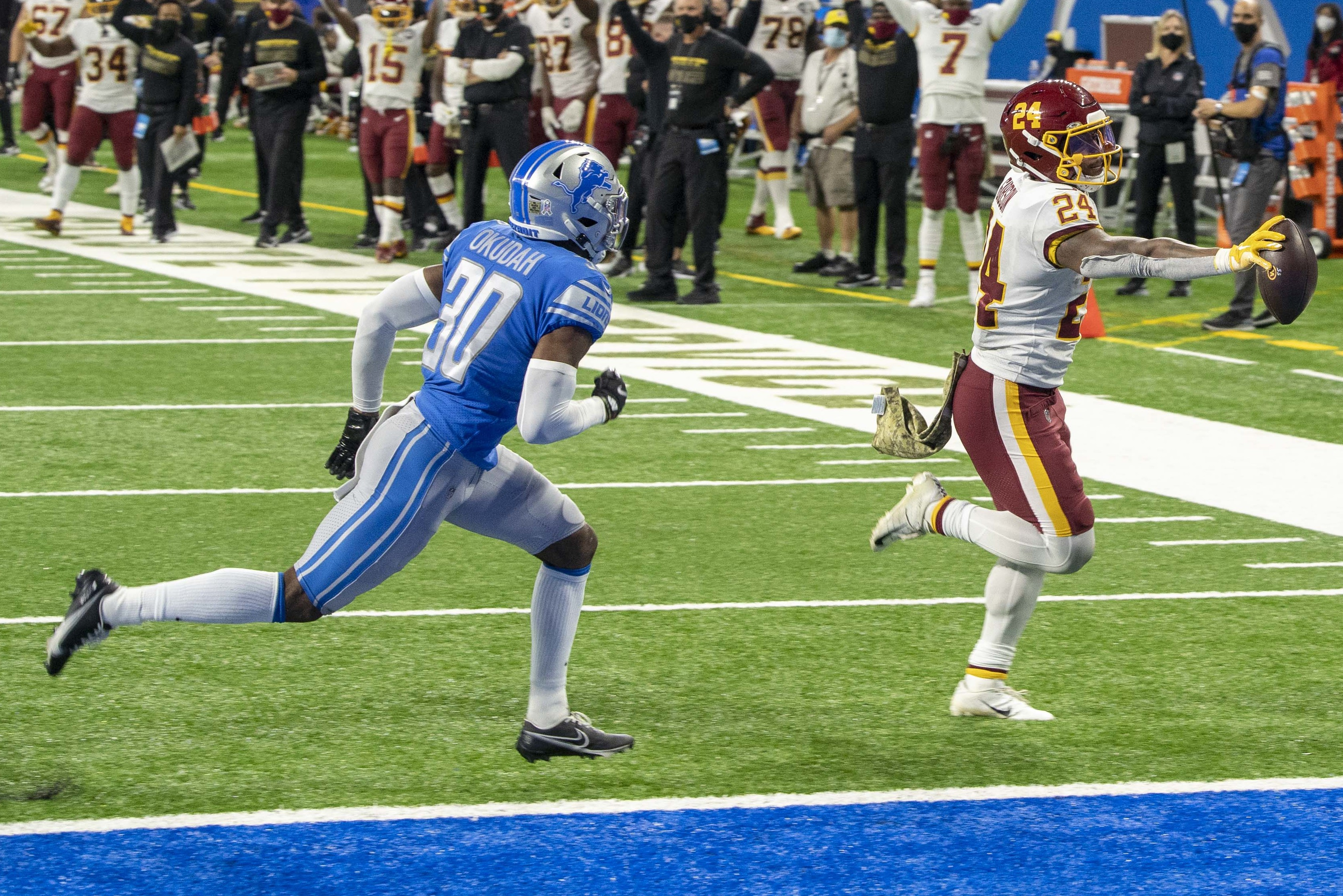
Okudah playing against the Washington Football Team in 2020.

=== Detroit Lions ===
Okudah was considered to be the best cornerback prospect in the 2020 NFL draft, where he was selected third overall by the Detroit Lions. He signed his four-year rookie contract with the team on July 13, 2020. The contract was worth a fully guaranteed $33.528 million, including a $21.944 million signing bonus. He suffered a hamstring injury during training camp and missed the opening season game. He returned in Week 2 against the Green Bay Packers, where he allowed three completions for 4 yards. The following week, he recorded his first career interception off a pass thrown by Arizona Cardinals quarterback Kyler Murray. Okudah was placed on injured reserve after he underwent surgery to resolve a core muscle injury on December 15.

During the Lions' 2021 season opener against the San Francisco 49ers, Okudah ruptured his Achilles tendon and was placed on injured reserve.

Okudah was named a starter to start the Lions’ 2022 season, however towards the end of the season Okudah saw less playing time and was eventually benched. He did not see any action in the Week 18 game against the Green Bay Packers.

=== Atlanta Falcons ===
Okudah was traded to the Atlanta Falcons on April 13, 2023, in exchange for a fifth-round pick in the 2023 NFL draft.

=== Houston Texans ===
On March 15, 2024, Okudah signed a one-year contract with the Houston Texans. He was placed on injured reserve on September 11. He was activated on November 18.

=== Minnesota Vikings ===
On March 18, 2025, Okudah signed a one-year contract with the Minnesota Vikings. He was placed on injured reserve on November 8, due to a concussion he suffered in Week 8 against the Los Angeles Chargers.

== NFL career statistics ==
Legend
**Bold**	Career high

=== Regular season ===
Year	Team	Games		Tackles					Interceptions						Fumbles			
Year	Team	GP	GS	Cmb	Solo	Ast	Sck	TFL	PD	Int	Yds	Avg	Lng	TD	FF	FR	Yds	TD
2020	DET	9	6	47	41	6	0.0	**4**	2	**1**	**36**	**36.0**	**36**	0	0	0	0	0
2021	DET	1	1	4	3	1	0.0	0	1	0	0	0.0	0	0	0	0	0	0
2022	DET	**15**	**15**	**73**	**59**	**14**	0.0	2	**7**	**1**	20	20.0	20	**1**	**1**	0	0	0
2023	ATL	13	9	44	34	10	0.0	1	3	0	0	0.0	0	0	0	0	0	0
2024	HOU	6	0	9	8	1	0.0	0	1	0	0	0.0	0	0	0	0	0	0
2025	MIN	6	0	14	12	2	0.0	0	0	0	0	0.0	0	0	0	**1**	0	0
Career		50	31	191	157	34	0.0	7	14	2	56	28.0	36	1	1	1	0	0

=== Postseason ===
Year	Team	Games		Tackles					Interceptions						Fumbles			
Year	Team	GP	GS	Cmb	Solo	Ast	Sck	TFL	PD	Int	Yds	Avg	Lng	TD	FF	FR	Yds	TD
2024	HOU	2	0	0	0	0	0.0	0	0	0	0	0.0	0	0	0	0	0	0
Career		2	0	0	0	0	0.0	0	0	0	0	0.0	0	0	0	0	0	0
