= Ohio State Buckeyes football statistical leaders =

American college football team records

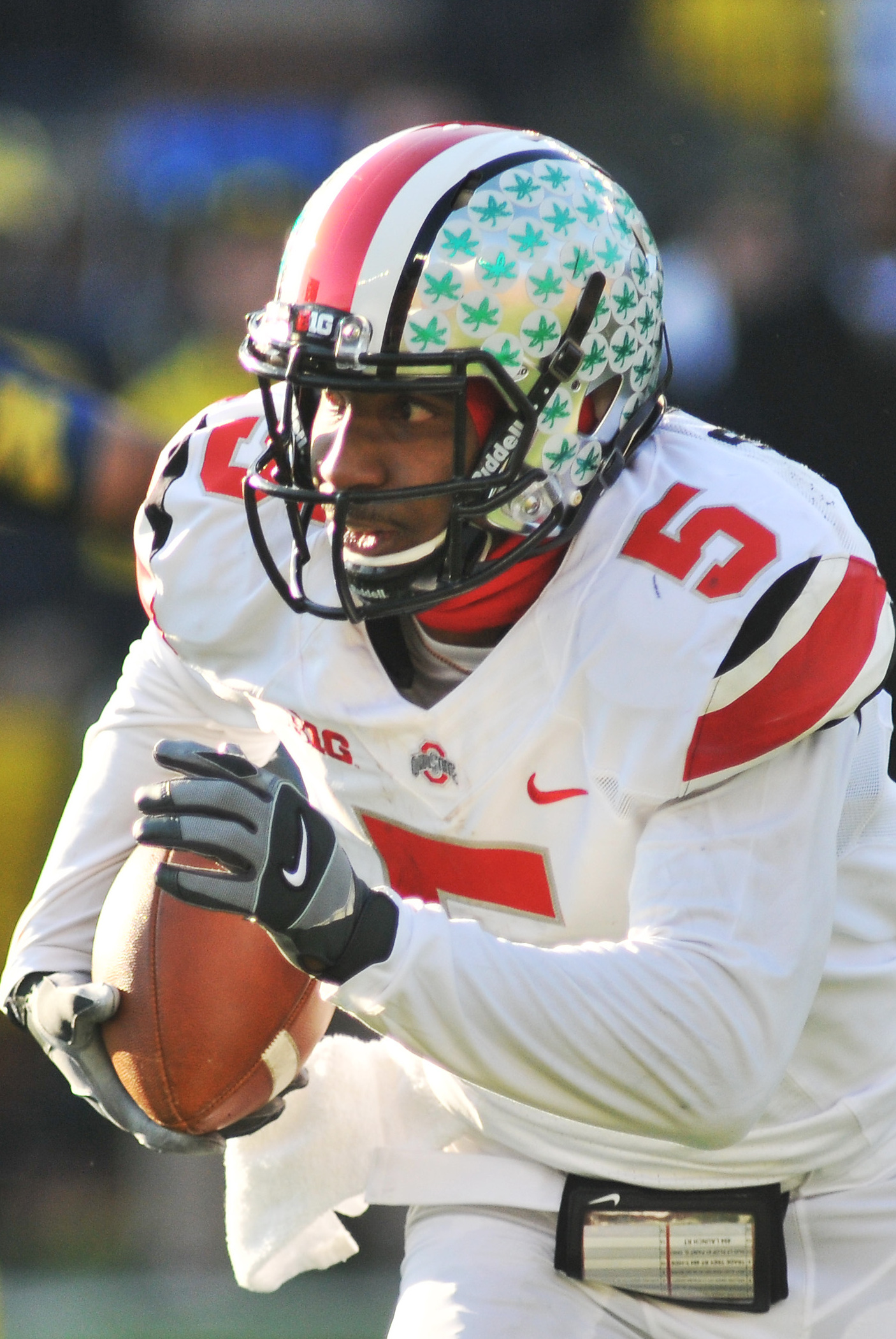
Despite playing his senior year as a wide receiver, Braxton Miller became the Buckeyes' career leader in total offense yards (surpassed since by J.T. Barrett)

The Ohio State Buckeyes football statistical leaders are individual statistical leaders of the Ohio State Buckeyes football program in various categories, including passing, rushing, receiving, total offense, defensive stats, and kicking. Within those areas, the lists identify single-game, single-season, and career leaders. The Buckeyes represent the Ohio State University in the NCAA Division I FBS Big Ten Conference.

Although Ohio State began competing in intercollegiate football in 1890, the school's official record book considers the "modern era" to have begun in 1944. Records from before this year are often incomplete and inconsistent, and they are generally not included in these lists.

These lists are dominated by more recent players for several reasons:

- Since 1944, seasons have increased from 10 games to 11 and then 12 games in length.
- The NCAA didn't allow freshmen to play varsity football until 1972 (with the exception of the World War II years), allowing players to have four-year careers.
- Since 2018, players have been allowed to participate in as many as four games in a redshirt season; previously, playing in even one game "burned" the redshirt. Since 2024, postseason games have not counted against the four-game limit. These changes to redshirt rules have given very recent players several extra games to accumulate statistics.
- Due to COVID-19 issues, the NCAA ruled that the 2020 season would not count against the athletic eligibility of any football player, giving everyone who played in that season the opportunity for five years of eligibility instead of the normal four.
- The NCAA only began counting bowl games toward single-season and career statistics in 2002. The Buckeyes have played in 21 bowl games since then, giving many recent players at least one additional game to accumulate statistics. Since the current College Football Playoff was established in 2014, the Buckeyes have advanced to the CFP title game in the 2014, 2020, and 2024 seasons. This gave players in 2014 and 2020 two extra games, and those in 2024 three extra games, to accumulate statistics. However, Ohio State's official record books included bowl games in single-season and career statistics long before the NCAA made it official policy.
- The Big Ten instituted a championship game starting in 2011, allowing the top team in each division to play another game each season. The Buckeyes have played in this game six times.
- Since former head coach Urban Meyer arrived in 2012, the Buckeyes have run a spread option offense. 2013 saw the most offensive yards in school history, and the 2014 team passed that mark. The emphasis on dual-threat quarterbacks has led to Braxton Miller and J. T. Barrett entering the leaderboards.

The Ohio State Media Guide does not include 2010 statistics for Terrelle Pryor, Dan Herron, and DeVier Posey due to NCAA sanctions, but they are reflected here.

Stats are updated through Week 12 of the 2026 season. All active players are listed in bold.

== Passing ==
=== Passing yards ===
Career
Rank	Player	Yards	Years
1	J. T. Barrett	9,434	2014 2015 2016 2017
2	C. J. Stroud	8,123	2020 2021 2022
3	Art Schlichter	7,547	1978 1979 1980 1981
4	Bobby Hoying	7,232	1992 1993 1994 1995
5	Joe Germaine	6,370	1996 1997 1998
6	Greg Frey	6,316	1987 1988 1989 1990
7	Terrelle Pryor	6,177	2008 2009 2010
8	Steve Bellisari	5,878	1998 1999 2000 2001
9	Troy Smith	5,720	2003 2004 2005 2006
10	**Julian Sayin**	5,701	2024 2025 2026

Single season
Rank	Player	Yards	Year
1	Dwayne Haskins	4,831	2018
2	C. J. Stroud	4,435	2021
3	Will Howard	4,010	2024
4	C. J. Stroud	3,688	2022
5	Julian Sayin	3,610	2025
6	Joe Germaine	3,330	1998
7	Justin Fields	3,273	2019
8	Bobby Hoying	3,269	1995
9	Kyle McCord	3,170	2023
10	J. T. Barrett	3,053	2017

Single game
Rank	Player	Yards	Year	Opponent
1	C. J. Stroud	573	2021	Utah
2	Dwayne Haskins	499	2018	Northwestern
3	C. J. Stroud	484	2021	Oregon
4	Dwayne Haskins	470	2018	Purdue
5	Art Schlichter	458	1981	Florida State
6	Dwayne Haskins	455	2018	Indiana
7	C. J. Stroud	432	2021	Michigan State
8	Dwayne Haskins	412	2018	Minnesota
9	C. J. Stroud	406	2021	Maryland
10	Dwayne Haskins	405	2018	Maryland
	C. J. Stroud	405	2021	Nebraska

=== Passing touchdowns ===
Career
Rank	Player	TDs	Years
1	J. T. Barrett	104	2014 2015 2016 2017
2	C. J. Stroud	85	2020 2021 2022
3	Justin Fields	63	2019 2020
4	Bobby Hoying	57	1992 1993 1994 1995
5	Terrelle Pryor	57	2008 2009 2010
6	Joe Germaine	56	1996 1997 1998
7	Troy Smith	54	2003 2004 2005 2006
	Dwayne Haskins	54	2017 2018
9	Braxton Miller	52	2011 2012 2013 2015
	**Julian Sayin**	52	2024 2025 2026

Single season
Rank	Player	TDs	Year
1	Dwayne Haskins	50	2018
2	C. J. Stroud	44	2021
3	Justin Fields	41	2019
	C. J. Stroud	41	2022
5	J. T. Barrett	35	2017
	Will Howard	35	2024
7	J. T. Barrett	34	2014
8	Julian Sayin	32	2025
9	Troy Smith	30	2006
10	Bobby Hoying	29	1995

Single game
Rank	Player	TDs	Year	Opponent
1	Kenny Guiton	6	2013	Florida A&M
	J. T. Barrett	6	2014	Kent State
	J. T. Barrett	6	2016	Bowling Green
	Dwayne Haskins	6	2018	Indiana
	Dwayne Haskins	6	2018	Michigan
	Justin Fields	6	2020	Clemson
	C. J. Stroud	6	2021	Michigan State
	C. J. Stroud	6	2021	Utah
	C. J. Stroud	6	2022	Michigan State
10	John Borton	5	1952	Washington State
	Bobby Hoying	5	1994	Purdue
	Bobby Hoying	5	1995	Pittsburgh
	J. T. Barrett	5	2017	Nebraska
	Dwayne Haskins	5	2018	Oregon State
	Dwayne Haskins	5	2018	Tulane
	Dwayne Haskins	5	2018	Northwestern
	Justin Fields	5	2020	Rutgers
	C. J. Stroud	5	2021	Rutgers
	C. J. Stroud	5	2021	Maryland
	C. J. Stroud	5	2021	Purdue
	C. J. Stroud	5	2022	Toledo
	C. J. Stroud	5	2022	Wisconsin
	C. J. Stroud	5	2022	Indiana

== Rushing ==
=== Rushing attempts ===
Career
Rank	Player	Att	Years
1	Archie Griffin	924	1972 1973 1974 1975
2	J. K. Dobbins	725	2017 2018 2019
3	Eddie George	683	1992 1993 1994 1995
4	Pepe Pearson	659	1994 1995 1996 1997
5	J. T. Barrett	656	2014 2015 2016 2017
6	Tim Spencer	644	1979 1980 1981 1982
7	Keith Byars	619	1982 1983 1984 1985
8	Carlos Snow	610	1988 1989 1990 1991
9	Braxton Miller	599	2011 2012 2013 2015
10	Lydell Ross	596	2001 2002 2003 2004

Single season
Rank	Player	Att	Year
1	Keith Byars	336	1984
2	Eddie George	328	1995
3	J. K. Dobbins	301	2019
4	Pepe Pearson	299	1996
5	Ezekiel Elliott	289	2015
6	Eddie George	276	1994
7	Beanie Wells	274	2007
8	Ezekiel Elliott	273	2014
	Raymont Harris	273	1993
	Tim Spencer	273	1982

Single game
Rank	Player	Att	year	Opponent
1	Champ Henson	44	1972	Northwestern
2	John Brockington	42	1970	Northwestern
3	Keith Byars	40	1984	Michigan State
4	Beanie Wells	39	2007	Michigan
	Eddie George	39	1994	Northwestern
	Raymont Harris	39	1993	BYU
	Keith Byars	39	1984	Illinois

=== Rushing yards ===
Career
Rank	Player	Yards	Years
1	Archie Griffin	5,589	1972 1973 1974 1975
2	J. K. Dobbins	4,459	2017 2018 2019
3	Ezekiel Elliott	3,961	2013 2014 2015
4	Eddie George	3,768	1992 1993 1994 1995
5	TreVeyon Henderson	3,761	2021 2022 2023 2024
6	Tim Spencer	3,553	1979 1980 1981 1982
7	Beanie Wells	3,382	2006 2007 2008
8	Braxton Miller	3,314	2011 2012 2013 2015
9	J. T. Barrett	3,263	2014 2015 2016 2017
10	Keith Byars	3,200	1982 1983 1984 1985

Single season
Rank	Player	Yards	Year
1	J. K. Dobbins	2,003	2019
2	Eddie George	1,927	1995
3	Ezekiel Elliott	1,878	2014
4	Ezekiel Elliott	1,821	2015
5	Keith Byars	1,764	1984
6	Archie Griffin	1,695	1974
7	Beanie Wells	1,609	2007
8	Archie Griffin	1,577	1973
9	Tim Spencer	1,538	1982
10	Carlos Hyde	1,521	2013

Single game
Rank	Player	Yards	Year	Opponent
1	Trey Sermon	331	2020	Northwestern
2	Eddie George	314	1995	Illinois
3	TreVeyon Henderson	277	2021	Tulsa
4	Ezekiel Elliott	274	2015	Indiana
	Keith Byars	274	1984	Illinois
6	Ezekiel Elliott	246	2014	Oregon
	Carlos Hyde	246	2013	Illinois
	Archie Griffin	246	1973	Iowa
9	Archie Griffin	239	1972	North Carolina
10	Raymont Harris	235	1993	BYU

=== Rushing touchdowns ===
Career
Rank	Player	TDs	Years
1	Pete Johnson	56	1973 1974 1975 1976
2	Keith Byars	46	1982 1983 1984 1985
3	Eddie George	44	1992 1993 1994 1995
4	Ezekiel Elliott	43	2013 2014 2015
	J. T. Barrett	43	2014 2015 2016 2017
6	TreVeyon Henderson	42	2021 2022 2023 2024
7	J. K. Dobbins	38	2017 2018 2019
8	Carlos Hyde	37	2010 2011 2012 2013
9	Harold Henson	36	1972 1973 1974
10	Tim Spencer	36	1979 1980 1981 1982

Single season
Rank	Player	TDs	Year
1	Pete Johnson	25	1975
2	Eddie George	24	1995
3	Ezekiel Elliott	23	2015
4	Keith Byars	22	1984
5	J. K. Dobbins	21	2019
6	Harold Henson	20	1972
	Keith Byars	20	1983
8	Ezekiel Elliott	18	2014
9	Jim Otis	17	1968
	John Brockington	17	1970
	Pepe Pearson	17	1996

Single game
Rank	Player	TDs	Year	Opponent
1	Pete Johnson	5	1974	North Carolina
	Keith Byars	5	1984	Illinois
	Miyan Williams	5	2022	Rutgers
4	J. K. Dobbins	4	2019	Michigan
	Ezekiel Elliott	4	2014	Oregon

== Receiving ==
=== Receptions ===
Career
Rank	Player	Rec	Years
1	**Jeremiah Smith**	249	2024 2025 2026
2	Emeka Egbuka	205	2021 2022 2023 2024
3	K. J. Hill	201	2016 2017 2018 2019
4	David Boston	191	1996 1997 1998
5	Chris Olave	176	2018 2019 2020 2021
6	Cris Carter	168	1984 1985 1986
7	Michael Jenkins	165	2001 2002 2003
8	Marvin Harrison Jr.	155	2021 2022 2023
9	Gary Williams	154	1979 1980 1981 1982
10	Corey Brown	145	2010 2011 2012 2013

Single season
Rank	Player	Rec	Year
1	Jaxon Smith-Njigba	95	2021
2	Parris Campbell	90	2018
3	Jeremiah Smith	87	2025
4	**Jeremiah Smith**	86	2026
5	David Boston	85	1998
6	Emeka Egbuka	81	2024
7	Marvin Harrison Jr.	77	2022
8	Jeremiah Smith	76	2024
9	Curtis Samuel	74	2016
10	Emeka Egbuka	74	2022

Single game
Rank	Player	Rec	Year	Opponent
1	Jaxon Smith-Njigba	15	2021	Nebraska
	Jaxon Smith-Njigba	15	2021	Utah
3	David Boston	14	1997	Penn State
4	Gary Williams	13	1981	Florida
	David Boston	13	1996	Indiana
6	Bob Grimes	12	1952	Pitt
	Billy Anders	12	1966	Washington
	Brian Stablein	12	1992	Michigan
	Corey Brown	12	2012	Michigan State
	K. J. Hill	12	2017	Penn State
	Chris Olave	12	2021	Oregon
	Jeremiah Smith	12	2026	Illinois

=== Receiving yards ===
Career
Rank	Player	Yards	Years
1	**Jeremiah Smith**	4,040	2024 2025 2026
2	Michael Jenkins	2,898	2001 2002 2003
3	Emeka Egbuka	2,868	2021 2022 2023 2024
4	David Boston	2,855	1996 1997 1998
5	Gary Williams	2,792	1979 1980 1981 1982
6	Cris Carter	2,725	1984 1985 1986
7	Chris Olave	2,711	2018 2019 2020 2021
8	Marvin Harrison Jr.	2,613	2021 2022 2023
9	Devin Smith	2,503	2011 2012 2013 2014
10	K. J. Hill	2,332	2016 2017 2018 2019

Single season
Rank	Player	Yards	Year
1	Jaxon Smith-Njigba	1,606	2021
2	**Jeremiah Smith**	1,482	2026
3	David Boston	1,435	1998
4	Terry Glenn	1,411	1995
5	Jeremiah Smith	1,315	2024
6	Marvin Harrison Jr.	1,263	2022
7	Jeremiah Smith	1,243	2025
8	Marvin Harrison Jr.	1,211	2023
9	Emeka Egbuka	1,151	2022
10	Cris Carter	1,127	1986

Single game
Rank	Player	Yards	Year	Opponent
1	Jaxon Smith-Njigba	347	2021	Utah
2	Terry Glenn	253	1995	Pittsburgh
3	Jaxon Smith-Njigba	240	2021	Nebraska
4	Santonio Holmes	224	2004	Marshall
5	Gary Williams	220	1981	Florida State
6	David Boston	217	1998	Michigan
	Jeremiah Smith	217	2026	Illinois
8	Jeremiah Smith	206	2026	Iowa
9	Dimitrious Stanley	199	1996	Wisconsin
10	Parris Campbell	192	2018	Michigan

=== Receiving touchdowns ===
Career
Rank	Player	TDs	Years
1	**Jeremiah Smith**	44	2024 2025 2026
2	Chris Olave	35	2018 2019 2020 2021
3	David Boston	34	1996 1997 1998
4	Marvin Harrison Jr.	31	2021 2022 2023
5	Devin Smith	30	2011 2012 2013 2014
6	Cris Carter	27	1984 1985 1986
7	Santonio Holmes	25	2003 2004 2005
8	Brian Robiskie	24	2005 2006 2007 2008
	Emeka Egbuka	24	2021 2022 2023 2024
10	Garrett Wilson	23	2019 2020 2021

Single season
Rank	Player	TDs	Year
1	Terry Glenn	17	1995
	**Jeremiah Smith**	17	2026
3	Jeremiah Smith	15	2024
4	David Boston	14	1997
	Marvin Harrison Jr.	14	2022
	Marvin Harrison Jr.	14	2023
7	David Boston	13	1998
	Chris Olave	13	2021
9	Devin Smith	12	2014
	Parris Campbell	12	2018
	Chris Olave	12	2019
	Garrett Wilson	12	2021
	Jeremiah Smith	12	2025

Single game
Rank	Player	TDs	Year	Opponent
1	Bob Grimes	4	1952	Washington State
	Terry Glenn	4	1995	Pitt
	Dane Sanzenbacher	4	2010	Eastern Michigan
	Noah Brown	4	2016	Oklahoma
	Jeremiah Smith	4	2026	Illinois
6	Alex Verdova	3	1948	Wisconsin
	Joey Galloway	3	1994	Purdue
	Brian Robiskie	3	2007	Northwestern
	Joey Galloway	3	1993	Michigan State
	Jake Stoneburner	3	2011	Akron
	Devin Smith	3	2014	Wisconsin
	Garrett Wilson	3	2021	Purdue
	Jaxon Smith-Njigba	3	2021	Utah
	Marvin Harrison Jr.	3	2021	Utah
	Marvin Harrison Jr.	3	2022	Arkansas State
	Marvin Harrison Jr.	3	2022	Michigan State
	Emeka Egbuka	3	2024	Iowa

== Total offense ==
Total offense is the sum of passing and rushing statistics. It does not include receiving or returns.

=== Total offense yards ===
Career
Rank	Player	Yards	Years
1	J. T. Barrett	12,697	2014 2015 2016 2017
2	Braxton Miller	8,950	2011 2012 2013 2015
3	Art Schlichter	8,850	1978 1979 1980 1981
4	Terrelle Pryor	8,341	2008 2009 2010
5	C. J. Stroud	8,259	2020 2021 2022
6	Bobby Hoying	7,151	1992 1993 1994 1995
7	Troy Smith	6,888	2003 2004 2005 2006
8	Steve Bellisari	6,496	1998 1999 2000 2001
9	Justin Fields	6,240	2019 2020
10	Greg Frey	6,098	1987 1988 1989 1990

Single season
Rank	Player	Yards	Year
1	Dwayne Haskins	4,939	2018
2	C. J. Stroud	4,415	2021
3	Will Howard	4,236	2024
4	J. T. Barrett	3,851	2017
5	C. J. Stroud	3,796	2022
6	J. T. Barrett	3,772	2014
7	Justin Fields	3,757	2019
8	Julian Sayin	3,566	2025
9	Terrelle Pryor	3,526	2010
10	J. T. Barrett	3,400	2016

Single game
Rank	Player	Yards	Year	Opponent
1	C. J. Stroud	583	2021	Utah
2	Dwayne Haskins	494	2018	Northwestern
3	C. J. Stroud	481	2021	Oregon
4	Dwayne Haskins	477	2018	Purdue
5	Dwayne Haskins	464	2018	Maryland
6	Dwayne Haskins	462	2018	Indiana
7	Dwayne Haskins	430	2018	Michigan
8	C. J. Stroud	428	2021	Michigan State
9	Justin Fields	427	2020	Clemson
10	J. T. Barrett	423	2017	Penn State

=== Touchdowns responsible for ===
"Touchdowns responsible for" is the NCAA's official term for combined passing and rushing touchdowns.

Career
Rank	Player	TDs	Years
1	J. T. Barrett	147	2014 2015 2016 2017
2	Braxton Miller	88	2011 2012 2013 2015
3	C. J. Stroud	86	2020 2021 2022
4	Art Schlichter	85	1978 1979 1980 1981
5	Justin Fields	78	2019 2020
6	Terrelle Pryor	74	2008 2009 2010
7	Troy Smith	68	2003 2004 2005 2006
8	Bobby Hoying	61	1992 1993 1994 1995
9	Dwayne Haskins	58	2017 2018
10	Pete Johnson	56	1973 1974 1975 1976
	Joe Germaine	56	1996 1997 1998

Single season
Rank	Player	TDs	Year
1	Dwayne Haskins	54	2018
2	Justin Fields	51	2019
3	J. T. Barrett	47	2017
4	J. T. Barrett	45	2014
5	C. J. Stroud	44	2021
6	Will Howard	42	2024
7	C. J. Stroud	41	2022
8	Braxton Miller	36	2013
9	J. T. Barrett	33	2016
10	Julian Sayin	32	2025

Single game
Rank	Player	TDs	Year	Opponent
1	J. T. Barrett	7	2016	Bowling Green
	J. T. Barrett	7	2017	Nebraska
3	Tony Curcillo	6	1951	Iowa
	Kenny Guiton	6	2013	Florida A&M
	J. T. Barrett	6	2014	Kent State
	Dwayne Haskins	6	2018	Indiana
	Dwayne Haskins	6	2018	Maryland
	Dwayne Haskins	6	2018	Michigan
	Justin Fields	6	2019	Miami (OH)
	Justin Fields	6	2020	Rutgers
	Justin Fields	6	2020	Clemson (Sugar Bowl)
	C. J. Stroud	6	2021	Michigan State
	C. J. Stroud	6	2021	Utah (Rose Bowl)
	C. J. Stroud	6	2022	Michigan State

== Defense ==
=== Interceptions ===
Career
Rank	Player	Ints	Years
1	Mike Sensibaugh	22	1968 1969 1970
2	Fred Bruney	17	1950 1951 1952
3	Ted Provost	16	1967 1968 1969
	William White	16	1984 1985 1986 1987
5	Neal Colzie	15	1972 1973 1974
6	Sonny Gordon	14	1983 1984 1985 1986
	Ahmed Plummer	14	1996 1997 1998 1999
8	Vince Skillings	13	1978 1979 1980
9	Kelvin Bell	12	1981 1982 1983
	David Brown	12	1986 1987 1988 1989
	Damon Moore	12	1995 1996 1997 1998

Single season
Rank	Player	Ints	Year
1	Mike Sensibaugh	9	1969
	Craig Cassady	9	1975
3	Mike Sensibaugh	8	1970
	Neal Colzie	8	1974
5	Fred Bruney	7	1951
	Fred Bruney	7	1952
	Arnie Chonko	7	1964
	Ted Provost	7	1967
	Sonny Gordon	7	1986
	Vinnie Clark	7	1990
	Malik Hooker	7	2016

Single game
Rank	Player	Ints	Year	Opponent
1	Fred Bruney	3	1951	Illinois
	Fred Bruney	3	1952	Michigan
	Arnie Chonko	3	1964	Indiana
	Ted Provost	3	1967	Northwestern
	Bruce Ruhl	3	1974	Wisconsin
	Craig Cassady	3	1975	Michigan State
	Mike Guess	3	1977	SMU
	William White	3	1987	West Virginia
	Damon Moore	3	1996	Iowa

=== Tackles ===
Career
Rank	Player	Tackles	Years
1	Marcus Marek	572	1979 1980 1981 1982
2	Tom Cousineau	569	1975 1976 1977 1978
3	Chris Spielman	546	1984 1985 1986 1987
4	Steve Tovar	408	1989 1990 1991 1992
5	A. J. Hawk	394	2002 2003 2004 2005
6	Pepper Johnson	379	1982 1983 1984 1985
7	James Laurinaitis	375	2005 2006 2007 2008
8	Alvin Washington	345	1977 1978 1979 1980
9	Ed Thompson	338	1974 1975 1976
10	Glen Cobb	336	1979 1980 1981 1982

Single season
Rank	Player	Tackles	Year
1	Tom Cousineau	211	1978
2	Chris Spielman	205	1986
3	Marcus Marek	178	1982
4	David Adkins	172	1977
5	Rowland Tatum	156	1983
	Chris Spielman	156	1987
7	Ed Thompson	149	1976
8	Marcus Marek	148	1981
9	Tom Cousineau	147	1976
10	Alvin Washington	146	1978

Single game
Rank	Player	Tackles	Year	Opponent
1	Tom Cousineau	29	1978	Penn State
	Chris Spielman	29	1986	Michigan
3	Tom Cousineau	28	1978	SMU
4	Arnie Jones	24	1972	Michigan
	David Adkins	24	1977	Oklahoma
6	Tom Cousineau	23	1975	Indiana
	Tom Cousineau	23	1978	Baylor
8	Randy Gradishar	22	1973	Washington State
	Tom Cousineau	22	1976	Michigan
	Chris Spielman	22	1986	Washington

=== Sacks ===
Career
Rank	Player	Sacks	Years
1	Mike Vrabel	36	1993 1994 1995 1996
2	Chase Young	30.5	2017 2018 2019
3	Jason Simmons	27.5	1990 1991 1992 1993
4	Joey Bosa	26	2013 2014 2015
5	Matt Finkes	25	1993 1994 1995 1996
6	JT Tuimoloau	23.5	2021 2022 2023 2024
7	Eric Kumerow	23	1984 1985 1986 1987
	Jack Sawyer	23	2021 2022 2023 2024
9	Vernon Gholston	22.5	2004 2006 2007
	Tyquan Lewis	22.5	2014 2015 2016 2017

Single season
Rank	Player	Sacks	Year
1	Chase Young	16.5	2019
2	Vernon Gholston	14	2007
3	Joey Bosa	13.5	2014
4	Mike Vrabel	13	1995
5	JT Tuimoloau	12.5	2024
6	Mike Vrabel	12	1994
	Andy Katzenmoyer	12	1996
8	Matt Finkes	11	1994
	Caden Curry	11	2025
10	Jason Simmons	10.5	1991
	Will Smith	10.5	2003
	Chase Young	10.5	2018

Single game
Rank	Player	Sacks	Year	Opponent
1	Jason Simmons	4	1991	Washington State
	Bobby Carpenter	4	2005	Michigan State
	Vernon Gholston	4	2007	Wisconsin
	John Simon	4	2012	Wisconsin
	Chase Young	4	2019	Wisconsin
6	David Thompson	3.5	2002	Illinois

== Kicking ==
=== Field goals made ===
Career
Rank	Player	FGs	Years
1	Mike Nugent	72	2001 2002 2003 2004
2	Dan Stultz	59	1996 1997 1998 1999 2000
3	Tim Williams	49	1990 1991 1992 1993
4	Jayden Fielding	45	2022 2023 2024 2025
5	Vlade Janakievski	41	1977 1978 1979 1980
6	Rich Spangler	39	1982 1983 1984 1985
7	Noah Ruggles	37	2021 2022
8	Josh Jackson	36	1993 1994 1995 1996
9	Ryan Pretorius	34	2005 2006 2007 2008
10	Drew Basil	33	2010 2011 2012 2013

Single season
Rank	Player	FGs	Year
1	Mike Nugent	25	2002
2	Mike Nugent	24	2004
3	Josh Huston	22	2005
4	Devin Barclay	20	2010
	Noah Ruggles	20	2021
6	Dan Stultz	19	2000
7	Vlade Janakievski	18	1979
	Pat O'Morrow	18	1988
	Ryan Pretorius	18	2007

Single game
Rank	Player	FGs	Year	Opponent
1	Bob Atha	5	1981	Indiana
	Mike Nugent	5	2004	North Carolina State
	Josh Huston	5	2005	Texas
	Devin Barclay	5	2010	Miami (FL)

=== Field goal percentage ===
Career
Rank	Player	FG%	Years
1	Noah Ruggles	90.2%	2021 2022
2	Mike Nugent	81.8%	2001 2002 2003 2004
3	Blake Haubeil	80.0%	2017 2018 2019 2020
4	Devin Barclay	79.4%	2009 2010
5	Jayden Fielding	78.9%	2022 2023 2024 2025
6	Drew Basil	78.6%	2010 2011 2012 2013
7	Ryan Pretorius	77.3%	2005 2006 2007 2008
	Tyler Durbin	77.3%	2015 2016
9	Aaron Pettrey	74.4%	2006 2007 2008 2009
	Sean Nuernberger	74.4%	2014 2015 2017 2018

Single Season
Rank	Player	FG%	Year
1	Noah Ruggles	95.2%	2021
2	Drew Basil	90.0%	2013
3	Mike Nugent	89.3%	2002
4	Mike Nugent	88.9%	2004
5	Aaron Pettrey	87.5%	2008
6	Blake Haubeil	86.7%	2019
7	Vlade Janakievski	85.7%	1979
8	Noah Ruggles	85.0%	2022
9	Mike Nugent	84.2%	2003
	Drew Basil	84.2%	2011

== Yearly ==
Year	Scoring	Rushing	Passing	Receiving	Tackling
1944	Les Horvath	Les Horvath	Les Horvath	n/a	n/a
1945	Ollie Cline	Ollie Cline	Dick Fisher	n/a	n/a
1946	Joe Whisler	Joe Whisler	George Spencer	Cecil Souders	n/a
1947	Ollie Cline; Dean Sensanbaugher; Joe Whisler	Ollie Cline	Dick Slager	Fred "Curly" Morrison	n/a
1948	Joe Whisler	Joe Whisler	Pandel Savic	Alex Verdova	n/a
1949	Fred "Curly" Morrison	Gerald Krall	Pandel Savic	Ray Hamilton	n/a
1950	Vic Janowicz	Walt Klevay	Vic Janowicz	Thomas Watson	n/a
1951	Vic Janowicz; Tony Curcillo	Vic Janowicz	Tony Curcillo	Bob Joslin	n/a
1952	Howard "Hopalong" Cassady; Fred Bruney; Bob Grimes	John Hlay	John Borton	Bob Grimes	n/a
1953	Bobby Watkins	Bobby Watkins	John Borton	Thomas Hague	n/a
1954	Bobby Watkins	Howard "Hopalong" Cassady	Dave Leggett	Howard "Hopalong" Cassady	n/a
1955	Howard "Hopalong" Cassady	Howard "Hopalong" Cassady	Frank Ellwood	Paul Michael	n/a
1956	Don Clark; Jim Roseboro	Don Clark	Don Clark	Leo Brown	n/a
1957	Frank Kremblas	Don Clark	Frank Kremblas	Leo Brown; Dick LeBeau	n/a
1958	Bob White	Bob White	Frank Kremblas	Dick LeBeau; Don Clark	n/a
1959	David.Kilgore	Bob Ferguson	Tom Matte	Charles Bryant; Jim Houston	n/a
1960	Bob Ferguson	Bob Ferguson	Tom Matte	Charles Bryant	n/a
1961	Bob Ferguson	Bob Ferguson	Joe Sparma	Charles Bryant	n/a
1962	Dave Francis	Dave Francis	Joe Sparma	Paul Warfield	n/a
1963	Dick Van Raaphorst	Matt Snell	Don Unverferth	Paul Warfield	n/a
1964	Willard Sander	Willard Sander	Don Unverferth	Bo Rein	n/a
1965	Willard Sander	Tom Barrington	Don Unverferth	Bo Rein	n/a
1966	Paul Hudson	Bo Rein	Bill Long	Billy Ray Anders	n/a
1967	Bill Long	Jim Otis	Bill Long	Billy Ray Anders	n/a
1968	Jim Otis	Jim Otis	Rex Kern	Bruce Jankowski	n/a
1969	Jim Otis	Jim Otis	Rex Kern	Bruce Jankowski; Jan White	n/a
1970	John Brockington	John Brockington	Rex Kern	Jan White	Stan White
1971	Don Lamka; Fred Schram	Rick Galbos	Don Lamka	Dick Wakefield	Vic Koegel
1972	Champ Henson	Archie Griffin	Greg Hare	Rick Galbos	Rick Middleton
1973	Bruce Elia	Archie Griffin	Cornelius Greene	Fred Pagac	Randy Gradishar
1974	Tom Klaban	Archie Griffin	Cornelius Greene	Brian Baschnagel	Bruce Elia
1975	Pete Johnson	Archie Griffin	Cornelius Greene	Brian Baschnagel	Ed Thompson
1976	Pete Johnson	Jeff Logan	Jim Pacenta	James Harrell	Tom Cousineau
1977	Joel Payton	Ron Springs	Rod Gerald	Ron Springs	David Adkins
1978	Art Schlichter	Paul Campbell	Art Schlichter	Doug Donley	Tom Cousineau
1979	Vlade Janakievski	Calvin Murray	Art Schlichter	Doug Donley	Alvin Washington
1980	Vlade Janakievski	Calvin Murray	Art Schlichter	Doug Donley	Marcus Marek
1981	Bob Atha	Tim Spencer	Art Schlichter	Gary Williams	Marcus Marek
1982	Tim Spencer	Tim Spencer	Mike Tomczak	Gary Williams	Marcus Marek
1983	Keith Byars	Keith Byars	Mike Tomczak	John Frank	Rowland Tatum
1984	Keith Byars	Keith Byars	Mike Tomczak	Keith Byars	Pepper Johnson
1985	Rich Spangler	John Wooldridge	Jim Karsatos	Cris Carter	Pepper Johnson
1986	Matt Frantz	Vince Workman	Jim Karsatos	Cris Carter	Chris Spielman
1987	Matt Frantz	Vince Workman	Tom Tupa	Everett Ross	Chris Spielman
1988	Pat O'Morrow	Carlos Snow	Greg Frey	Jeff Ellis	John Sullivan
1989	Carlos Snow	Carlos Snow	Greg Frey	Jeff Graham	Derek Isaman
1990	Tim Williams	Robert Smith	Greg Frey	Bobby Olive	Steve Tovar
1991	Tim Williams	Carlos Snow	Kent Graham	Bernard Edwards	Steve Tovar
1992	Tim Williams	Robert Smith	Kirk Herbstreit	Brian Stablein	Steve Tovar
1993	Joey Galloway	Raymont Harris	Bobby Hoying	Joey Galloway	Lorenzo Styles
1994	Josh Jackson	Eddie George	Bobby Hoying	Joey Galloway	Lorenzo Styles
1995	Eddie George	Eddie George	Bobby Hoying	Terry Glenn	Greg Bellisari
1996	Pepe Pearson	Pepe Pearson	Stanley Jackson	Dimitrious Stanley	Damon Moore
1997	Dan Stultz	Pepe Pearson	Joe Germaine	David Boston	Antoine Winfield
1998	Dan Stultz	Michael Wiley	Joe Germaine	David Boston	Damon Moore
1999	Michael Wiley	Michael Wiley	Steve Bellisari	Reggie Germany	Na'il Diggs
2000	Dan Stultz	Derek Combs	Steve Bellisari	Ken-Yon Rambo	Mike Doss
2001	Jonathan Wells	Jonathan Wells	Steve Bellisari	Michael Jenkins	Mike Doss
2002	Mike Nugent	Maurice Clarett	Craig Krenzel	Michael Jenkins	Matt Wilhelm
2003	Mike Nugent	Lydell Ross	Craig Krenzel	Michael Jenkins	A. J. Hawk
2004	Mike Nugent	Lydell Ross	Justin Zwick	Santonio Holmes	A. J. Hawk
2005	Josh Huston	Antonio Pittman	Troy Smith	Santonio Holmes	A. J. Hawk
2006	Antonio Pittman	Antonio Pittman	Troy Smith	Ted Ginn Jr.	James Laurinaitis
2007	Ryan Pretorius	Beanie Wells	Todd Boeckman	Brian Robiskie	James Laurinaitis
2008	Ryan Pretorius	Beanie Wells	Terrelle Pryor	Brian Robiskie	James Laurinaitis
2009	Aaron Pettrey	Terrelle Pryor	Terrelle Pryor	DeVier Posey	Ross Homan
2010	Devin Barclay	Dan Herron	Terrelle Pryor	Dane Sanzenbacher	Brian Rolle
2011	Drew Basil	Braxton Miller	Braxton Miller	Devin Smith	C. J. Barnett
2012	Carlos Hyde	Braxton Miller	Braxton Miller	Corey Brown	Ryan Shazier
2013	Carlos Hyde	Carlos Hyde	Braxton Miller	Corey Brown	Ryan Shazier
2014	Sean Nuernberger	Ezekiel Elliott	J. T. Barrett	Michael Thomas	Joshua Perry
2015	Ezekiel Elliott	Ezekiel Elliott	Cardale Jones	Michael Thomas	Raekwon McMillan
2016	Tyler Durbin	Mike Weber	J. T. Barrett	Curtis Samuel	Raekwon McMillan
2017	Sean Nuernberger	J. K. Dobbins	J. T. Barrett	Parris Campbell	Jerome Baker
2018	J. K. Dobbins	J. K. Dobbins	Dwayne Haskins	Parris Campbell	Jordan Fuller; Malik Harrison
2019	J. K. Dobbins	J. K. Dobbins	Justin Fields	Chris Olave	Malik Harrison
2020	Master Teague	Trey Sermon	Justin Fields	Chris Olave	Pete Werner
2021	Noah Ruggles	TreVeyon Henderson	C. J. Stroud	Jaxon Smith-Njigba	Ronnie Hickman
2022	Noah Ruggles	Miyan Williams	C. J. Stroud	Marvin Harrison Jr.	Tommy Eichenberg
2023	Jayden Fielding	TreVeyon Henderson	Kyle McCord	Marvin Harrison Jr.	Steele Chambers
2024	Jayden Fielding	Quinshon Judkins	Will Howard	Jeremiah Smith	Cody Simon
2025	Jayden Fielding	Bo Jackson	Julian Sayin	Jeremiah Smith	Sonny Styles
