= Raymont Harris =

American football player (born 1970)

No. 29, 34
- Position: Running back

Personal information
- Born: December 23, 1970 (age 55); Lorain, Ohio, U.S.
- Listed height: 6 ft 0 in (1.83 m)
- Listed weight: 230 lb (104 kg)

Career information
- High school: Admiral King (Lorain)
- College: Ohio State
- NFL draft: 1994: 4th round, 114th overall pick

Career history
- Chicago Bears (1994–1997); Green Bay Packers (1998); Denver Broncos (2000); New England Patriots (2000)

Awards and highlights
- Second-team All-Big Ten (1993)

Career NFL statistics
- Rushing yards: 2,509
- Rushing average: 3.7
- Rushing touchdowns: 16
- Stats at Pro Football Reference

Raymont LeShawn Harris (born December 23, 1970) is an American former professional football player who was a running back for six seasons in the National Football League (NFL) from 1994 to 2000. He played college football for the Ohio State Buckeyes and was selected by the Chicago Bears in the fourth round of the 1994 NFL draft. Harris played in the NFL with the Bears, Green Bay Packers, Denver Broncos and New England Patriots. He was nicknamed "the Ultraback" because of his versatility.

== College career ==
Harris attended Ohio State University, where he set the school record for most rushing yards in a bowl game (235) and finished his career at Ohio State as the school's sixth-leading rusher of all time. Harris finished his career with 2,649 yards rushing and is currently still ranked fourth in most yards in a single game (235 versus BYU) and eighth all-time in single season rushing attempts (1993). He graduated with a Bachelor of Arts degree in communications.

== NFL career ==
Pre-draft measurables
Height	Weight	Arm length	Hand span	40-yard dash	10-yard split	20-yard split	20-yard shuttle	Vertical jump	Broad jump	Bench press
6 ft 0 in (1.83 m)	225 lb (102 kg)	32 in (0.81 m)	9 1/4 in (0.23 m)	4.61 s	1.61 s	2.68 s	4.40 s	37.0 in (0.94 m)	9 ft 8 in (2.95 m)	22 reps

Harris was selected in the fourth round of the 1994 NFL draft with the 114th overall pick by the Chicago Bears. He subsequently became the starting fullback for the Bears after Merril Hoge suffered a career-ending injury. Harris became an integral part of the 1994 Chicago Bears playoff team. He went on to lead the Bears in rushing for the 1996 NFL season. His career best season came in 1997 where he had a career-high of 276 rushing carries for 1,033 rushing yards. He also finished tied for sixth in the NFL with ten rushing touchdowns.

Harris left the Bears after the 1997 season. The rest of his career was plagued by injuries, causing him to miss the 1999 season. He spent the final two years of his career with three teams. He retired in 2001 with 2,509 career rushing yards, 114 receptions for 739 yards, and 17 touchdowns.

== NFL career statistics ==
=== Regular season ===
Year	Team	Games		Rushing					Receiving					Fumbles	
Year	Team	GP	GS	Att	Yds	Avg	Lng	TD	Rec	Yds	Avg	Lng	TD	Fum	Lost
1994	CHI	16	11	123	464	3.8	13	1	39	236	6.1	18	0	1	0
1995	CHI	1	1	0	0	0.0	0	0	1	4	4.0	4	0	0	0
1996	CHI	12	10	194	748	3.9	23	4	32	296	9.3	47	1	3	3
1997	CHI	13	13	275	1,033	3.8	68	10	28	115	4.1	16	0	1	1
1998	GB	8	3	79	228	2.9	14	1	10	68	6.8	12	0	3	3
2000	DEN	3	0	10	22	2.2	6	0	2	19	9.5	16	0	0	0
2000	NE	1	0	3	14	4.7	7	0	2	1	0.5	2	0	0	0
Career		54	38	684	2,509	3.7	68	16	114	739	6.5	47	1	8	5

=== Postseason ===
Year	Team	Games		Rushing					Receiving					Fumbles	
Year	Team	GP	GS	Att	Yds	Avg	Lng	TD	Rec	Yds	Avg	Lng	TD	Fum	Lost
1994	CHI	2	2	21	93	4.4	29	1	8	44	5.5	10	0	0	0
Career		2	2	21	93	4.4	29	1	8	44	5.5	10	0	0	0

== Life after football ==
Harris joined The Ohio State University Department of Athletics in March 2010 as Director of Development. He was responsible for major gifts for all athletic priorities, including endowments and capital projects. He retired from OSU in September 2022.

Before going to the Department of Athletics, Harris served as Assistant Director of Development for the Fisher College of Business. In his time at Fisher, Harris oversaw their annual fund, managed the Fisher share holders, and worked to develop the Fisher Commons.

Raymont currently is the CEO of a coaching and executive consulting company he owns called Elite Mindset and Performance (EMP). He is also a professional speaker and does keynote speaking engagements for football teams, athletic groups, organizations, events, conferences and more. His website is: www.raymontharris.com. He was profiled by the NBC Columbus affiliate in 2023 for launching a non-profit, The Jean and Raymont Harris Foundation, honoring his late mother who died while giving birth to him.
