= Chase Young =

American football player (born 1999)

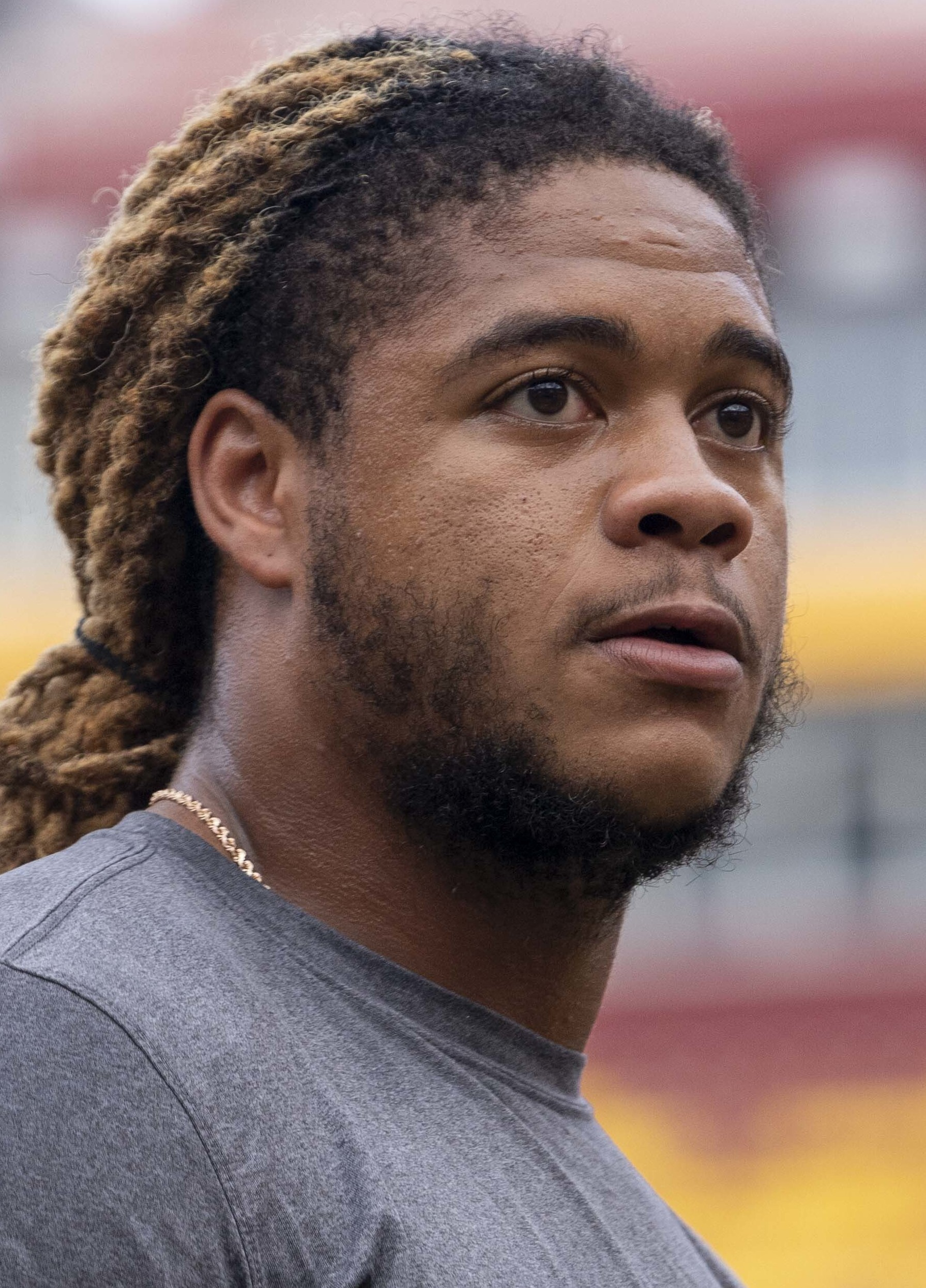
- Young in 2021

No. 99 – New Orleans Saints
- Position: Defensive end
- Roster status: Active

Personal information
- Born: April 14, 1999 (age 27); Upper Marlboro, Maryland, U.S.
- Listed height: 6 ft 5 in (1.96 m)
- Listed weight: 264 lb (120 kg)

Career information
- High school: DeMatha Catholic (Hyattsville, Maryland)
- College: Ohio State (2017–2019)
- NFL draft: 2020: 1st round, 2nd overall pick

Career history
- Washington Football Team / Commanders (2020–2023); San Francisco 49ers (2023); New Orleans Saints (2024–present)

Awards and highlights
- NFL Defensive Rookie of the Year (2020); Pro Bowl (2020); PFWA All-Rookie Team (2020); Bronko Nagurski Trophy (2019); Chuck Bednarik Award (2019); Ted Hendricks Award (2019); Unanimous All-American (2019); NCAA sacks leader (2019); Big Ten Male Athlete of the Year (2020); Big Ten Most Valuable Player (2019); Big Ten Defensive Player of the Year (2019); Big Ten Defensive Lineman of the Year (2019); First-team All-Big Ten (2019); Second-team All-Big Ten (2018)

Career NFL statistics as of Week 10, 2026
- Total tackles: 188
- Sacks: 40.0
- Forced fumbles: 10
- Fumble recoveries: 7
- Pass deflections: 20
- Defensive touchdowns: 2
- Stats at Pro Football Reference

Chase Young (born April 14, 1999) is an American professional football defensive end for the New Orleans Saints of the National Football League (NFL). He played college football for the Ohio State Buckeyes, where he was a unanimous All-American and Heisman Trophy finalist in 2019 after breaking the school's single-season sack record with 16.5.

Young was selected second overall by the Washington Redskins in the 2020 NFL draft and was named the Defensive Rookie of the Year. He suffered an ACL tear in 2021, leading to a lengthy recovery that forced him to also miss the majority of the 2022 season. Young was traded to the San Francisco 49ers in 2023, recording a sack in Super Bowl LVIII before signing with the Saints the following season.

== Early life ==
Young was born on April 14, 1999, in Upper Marlboro, Maryland. He began playing American football as a child, attending St. Columba School in Oxon Hill, Maryland, before attending St. Vincent Pallotti High School in Laurel, Maryland, in 2013. As a freshman there, he played as a quarterback, tight end, and outside linebacker before switching primarily to defensive end later that year. Young and the team won the Maryland Interscholastic Athletic Association C-conference championship in 2014. He was also a member of the school's choir, playing the piano, saxophone, and violin.

In 2015, Young transferred to DeMatha Catholic High School in Hyattsville, Maryland, where he had 19 quarterback sacks and 27 tackles for loss that season to help the team win the Washington Catholic Athletic Conference (WCAC) championship. He was invited to The Opening in July 2016, a college football recruiting camp sponsored by Nike, where he was named MVP at his position. As a senior in 2016, he had 19 sacks, 118 tackles, five forced fumbles, and two defensive touchdowns that helped the team go undefeated and win another WCAC championship.

By then, he was recognized as one of the best high school football players in the nation when he was included on the 2016 USA Today All-USA team and named all-metropolitan defensive football player of the year by The Washington Post. Young was also invited to the International Bowl and All-American Bowl, playing on the East team for the latter. Young also played for DeMatha's basketball team, playing alongside Markelle Fultz who was later selected first overall in the 2017 NBA draft. At the time, both he and Fultz had set goals to become the first overall selections in their respective sports.

== College career ==
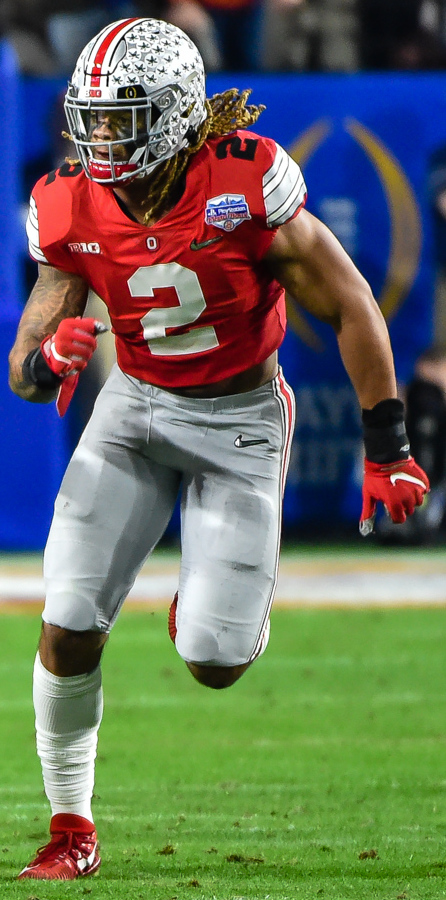
Young with the Ohio State Buckeyes in the 2019 Fiesta Bowl

Young received scholarship offers from over 40 universities before committing to Ohio State in July 2016 to play for the Buckeyes, choosing them over schools such as Alabama and Maryland due to their family-oriented approach and his desire to play under defensive line coach Larry Johnson. Young recorded 3.5 sacks, 18 tackles, and a forced fumble as a freshman in 2017. He became a starter during his sophomore season, with him recording 10.5 sacks for the year despite spraining both ankles halfway through. Three of them came against Northwestern in the 2018 Big Ten Football Championship Game. He was named second-team All-Big Ten for his performance.

Young was named one of the team captains as a junior in 2019. That year, he tied Ohio State school records for single-game sacks (4) and tackles for loss (5) in a win against Wisconsin. In November 2019, Young was suspended for two games by the NCAA for getting an unauthorized loan from a family friend to allegedly help his girlfriend attend the 2019 Rose Bowl, which he later repaid in full. In his first game after being reinstated, Young recorded three sacks against Penn State. He ended the season with 16.5 sacks, 46 tackles, 21 tackles for loss, 7 forced fumbles, 3 pass deflections, and a blocked field goal. His 16.5 sacks led the NCAA and broke the single-season school record previously held by Vernon Gholston, who had 14 in 2007.

In addition to being unanimously named to the 2019 College Football All-America Team, he won several other awards and honors that season including the Bronko Nagurski Trophy, Chuck Bednarik Award, Ted Hendricks Award, Chicago Tribune Silver Football, Nagurski–Woodson Defensive Player of the Year, and Smith–Brown Defensive Lineman of the Year. He was also named a finalist for the Walter Camp Award, Maxwell Award, and Heisman Trophy, becoming only the ninth defensive player since 1982 to be nominated for the latter, where he finished fourth in voting behind quarterbacks Joe Burrow, Jalen Hurts, and Justin Fields. Young was also voted the Big Ten Jesse Owens Athlete of the Year, which annually honors the Big Ten's top male athlete of any sport. He was the seventh football player to win it since its inception in 1982 and the first since Ron Dayne in 2000. Young finished his career at Ohio State with 30.5 sacks in three seasons, which ranks second all-time there behind Mike Vrabel, who had 36 in four. He was later named to the Big Ten Network's 2010s All-Decade Team as the only unanimous selection.

== Professional career ==
Pre-draft measurables
Height	Weight	Arm length	Hand span	Wingspan	Wonderlic
6 ft 4 7/8 in (1.95 m)	264 lb (120 kg)	33 3/4 in (0.86 m)	10 in (0.25 m)	6 ft 8 5/8 in (2.05 m)	19
All values from NFL Combine

Young decided to forgo his senior year at Ohio State by declaring for the 2020 NFL draft, where he was considered to be the best overall prospect by many in the media. He attended the NFL Combine but did not participate in any workouts or drills, stating that he did not want to waste time being a "combine athlete". Young was one of 58 players invited to the draft, which was held virtually due to social distancing regulations arising from the COVID-19 pandemic.

=== Washington Commanders ===
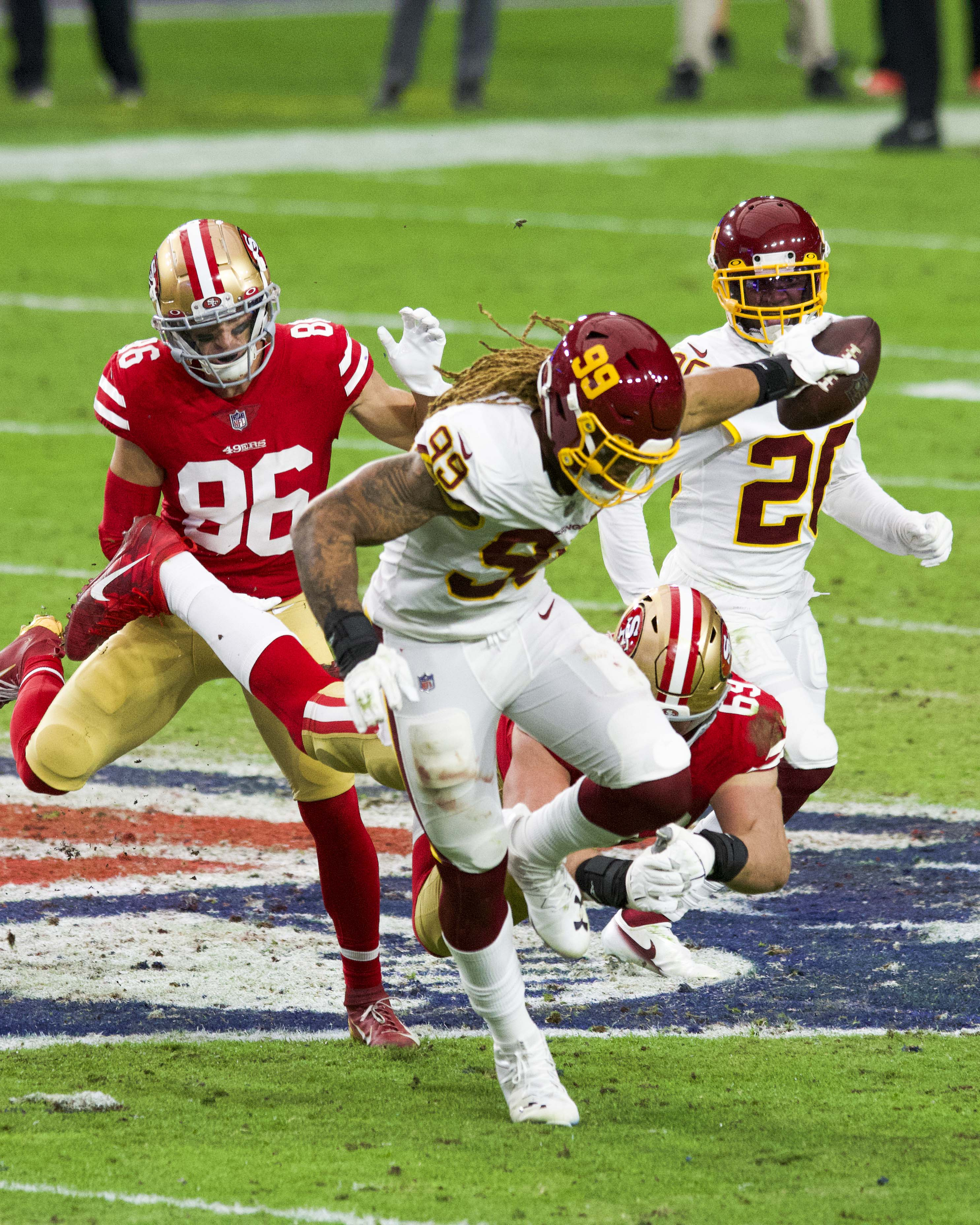
Young with the Washington Football Team returning a fumble for a touchdown against the San Francisco 49ers, 2020

==== 2020 ====
Young was selected second overall by the Washington Commanders. (Note: The team retired the Redskins branding later that offseason and became the Washington Football Team.) He signed his four-year rookie contract, worth US$34.56 million, on July 23, 2020. Young became the fourth defensive lineman consecutively drafted by Washington in the first round, after Jonathan Allen (2017), Daron Payne (2018), and Montez Sweat (2019).

Young was considered the favorite to win the NFL Defensive Rookie of the Year award during the lead-up to the season. In his debut, he had 1.5 sacks, four tackles, and a forced fumble in a win against the Philadelphia Eagles. He suffered a mild groin strain against the Cleveland Browns in Week 3 and missed the following game against the Baltimore Ravens. In a Week 14 game against the San Francisco 49ers, he recorded a sack, two passes defended, a forced fumble, and a fumble recovery which he returned 47 yards for a touchdown, becoming the first rookie in NFL history and only the third player since 1999 to achieve all of that in a single game. Young finished the season with 7.5 sacks, which led all rookies, as well as four forced fumbles and three fumble recoveries.

In December 2020, Young was named a team captain and was voted the NFC's Defensive Player of the Month, becoming the first rookie in Washington's history to receive that distinction. He was named Defensive Rookie of the Year by the Associated Press and Pro Football Writers of America (PFWA), and was the only rookie included on PFWA's all-conference team. Young was also one of only two rookies named to the 2021 Pro Bowl alongside Justin Jefferson of the Minnesota Vikings. He was also nominated for the Best Breakthrough Athlete award at the 2021 ESPYs, which went to NBA player LaMelo Ball, and was ranked 61st on the NFL Top 100 Players of 2021 list.

==== 2021 ====
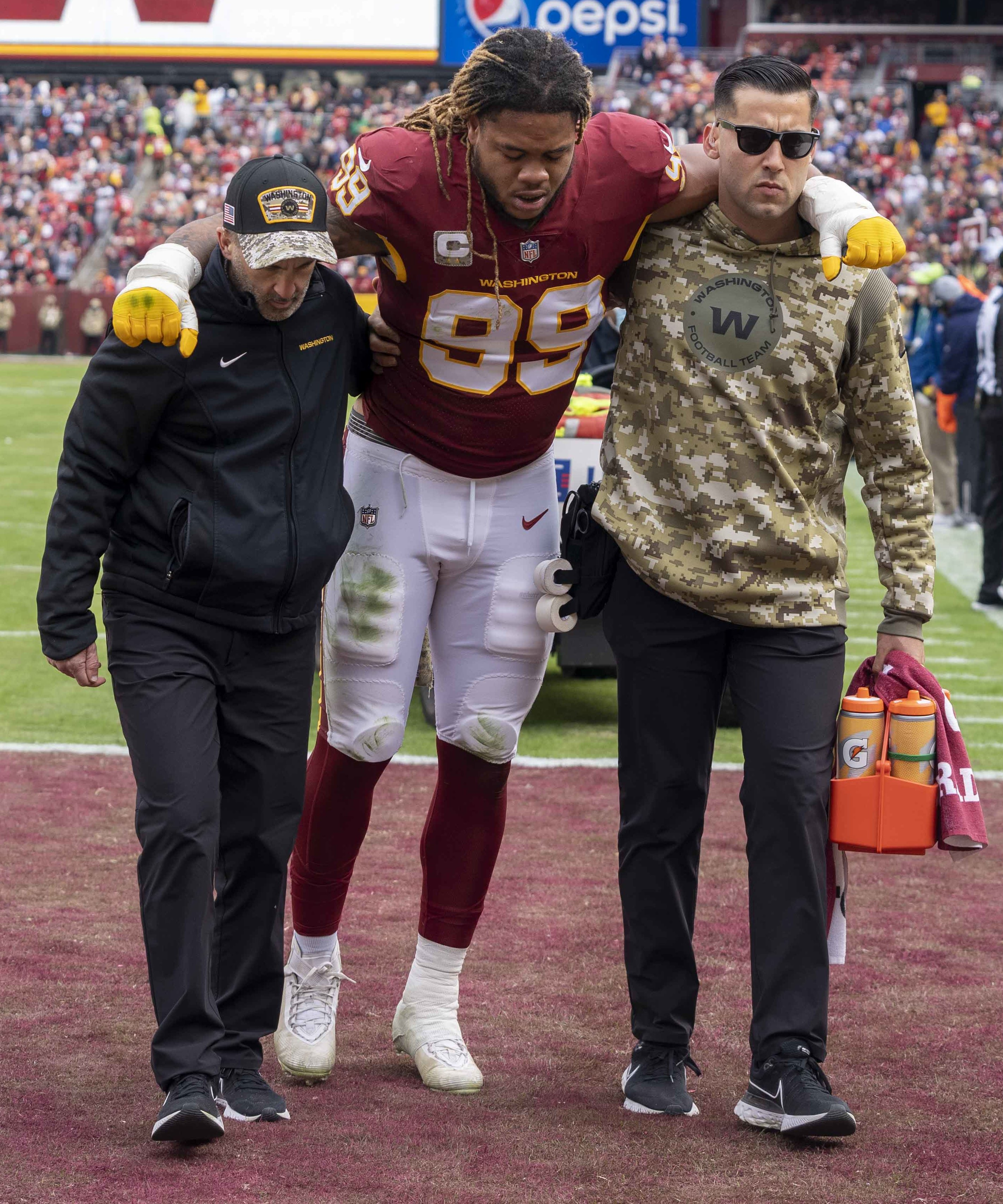
Young being helped off the field after suffering an ACL tear, 2021

Young's follow-up season in 2021 saw him record 21 tackles, 1.5 sacks, and two forced fumbles before tearing his anterior cruciate ligament (ACL) and patellar tendon in his right knee during a Week 10 game against the Tampa Bay Buccaneers. To reconstruct his ACL, the surgery included grafting part of the patellar tendon from his other knee, which led to additional recovery time. The season was considered a disappointment by many sportswriters, who expected him to have taken a step forward in his development.

==== 2022–2023 ====
Young was placed on the physically unable to perform list at the start of training camp in 2022. He returned to the active roster on November 21, 2022, but sat out the following three games before making his return against the 49ers in Week 16. The team declined his fifth-year rookie contract option prior to the 2023 season.

=== San Francisco 49ers ===
On November 1, 2023, Young was traded to the San Francisco 49ers in exchange for a 2024 third-round pick (100th overall; which Washington later used to select Luke McCaffrey). He recorded 2.5 sacks with the 49ers, finishing the season with 7.5 total. In Super Bowl LVIII, Young had one sack in the 25–22 overtime loss to the Chiefs.

=== New Orleans Saints ===
On March 18, 2024, Young signed a one-year contract with the New Orleans Saints. The following day, it was announced that Young would undergo neck surgery that would likely cause him to miss part of training camp. On July 18, Young was placed on the Active/Physically Unable to Perform (PUP) list. In Week 15, he recorded a season-high 2.0 sacks in a narrow 20–19 loss to his former Washington Commanders. He would go on to play in all 17 games of the regular season, finishing with 31 total tackles and 5.5 sacks.

On March 10, 2025, New Orleans re-signed Young to a three-year contract worth $51 million. After being injured in practice for Week 1 of the 2025 season, he continued to be sidelined with a calf injury for the first three games of the season. He was named NFC Defensive Player of the Month for December. In the 2025 season, he had ten sacks, 38 total tackles (22 solo), four passes defended, two forced fumbles, and three fumble recoveries.

== Career statistics ==
Legend
**Bold**	Career high

=== NFL ===
==== Regular season ====
Year	Team	Games		Tackles					Fumbles				Interceptions					
Year	Team	GP	GS	Cmb	Solo	Ast	Sck	TFL	FF	FR	Yds	TD	Int	Yds	Avg	Lng	TD	PD
2020	WAS	15	15	**44**	**32**	12	7.5	10	**4**	**3**	**57**	**1**	0	0	0.0	0	0	**4**
2021	WAS	9	9	26	15	11	1.5	3	2	0	0	0	0	0	0.0	0	0	2
2022	WAS	3	2	5	3	2	0.0	0	0	0	0	0	0	0	0.0	0	0	1
2023	WAS	7	6	15	12	3	5.0	6	0	0	0	0	0	0	0.0	0	0	1
2023	SF	9	0	10	5	5	2.5	1	0	0	0	0	0	0	0.0	0	0	1
2024	NO	17	0	31	21	10	5.5	8	1	0	0	0	0	0	0.0	0	0	3
2025	NO	12	12	38	22	**16**	**10.0**	**11**	2	**3**	28	**1**	0	0	0.0	0	0	**4**
2026	NO	9	9	19	9	10	8.0	5	1	1	27	0	0	0	0.0	0	0	4
Career		81	53	188	119	69	40.0	44	10	7	112	2	0	0	0.0	0	0	20

==== Postseason ====
Year	Team	Games		Tackles					Fumbles				Interceptions					
Year	Team	GP	GS	Cmb	Solo	Ast	Sck	TFL	FF	FR	Yds	TD	Int	Yds	Avg	Lng	TD	PD
2020	WAS	1	1	3	1	**2**	0.0	0	0	0	0	0	0	0	0.0	0	0	0
2023	SF	3	3	**8**	**6**	**2**	**1.0**	**2**	0	0	0	0	0	0	0.0	0	0	0
Career		4	4	11	7	4	1.0	2	0	0	0	0	0	0	0.0	0	0	0

=== College ===
Legend
Led the NCAA

College statistics
Season	GP	Tackles					Fumbles	
Season	GP	Cmb	Solo	Ast	TfL	Sck	FF	FR
2017	9	18	11	7	5	3.5	1	0
2018	13	34	25	9	14.5	10.5	1	0
2019	12	**46**	**32**	**14**	**21**	**16.5**	**7**	0
Career	34	98	68	30	40.5	30.5	9	0

== Awards and honors ==
NFL

- NFL Defensive Rookie of the Year (2020)
- Pro Bowl (2020)
- PFWA All-Rookie Team (2020)

College

- Bronko Nagurski Trophy (2019)
- Chuck Bednarik Award (2019)
- Ted Hendricks Award (2019)
- Unanimous All-American (2019)
- NCAA sacks leader (2019)
- Big Ten Male Athlete of the Year (2020)
- Big Ten Most Valuable Player (2019)
- Big Ten Defensive Player of the Year (2019)
- Big Ten Defensive Lineman of the Year (2019)
- First-team All-Big Ten (2019)
- Second-team All-Big Ten (2018)

== Personal life ==
Young's father Greg played college basketball at Bowie State University before working as a deputy sheriff with the Arlington County Sheriff's Office, while his mother Carla works for the Office of Investigations for the United States Department of Transportation. He has a sister, Weslie, who played college basketball at North Carolina Wesleyan. Young pursued a major in criminology at Ohio State after being inspired by his father and several of his uncles and cousins, who have all worked in law enforcement. He was also nicknamed "the Predator" during his time with the Buckeyes for his on-field performance and how his dreadlocks resembled Predators from the Predator franchise.

Young is represented by Klutch Sports Group, a sports agency founded by Rich Paul, and serves as their football ambassador for Klutch Athletics, a sportswear brand formed in partnership with New Balance in 2023. He has appeared in advertisements for Chipotle, Under Armour, and eBay, as well as on episodes of The Shop and Celebrity Family Feud. Young performed guest vocals on "Fire & Ice", a track from the American rapper Wale's 2021 album Folarin II. He was the honorary pace car driver for the 2022 Federated Auto Parts 400, a NASCAR Cup Series race held in Richmond, Virginia.
