= C. J. Stroud =

American football player (born 2001)

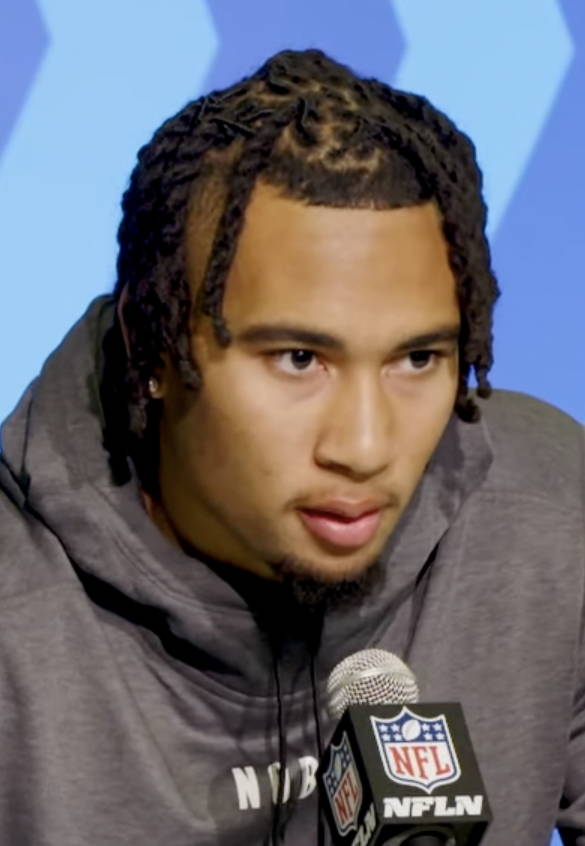
- Stroud in 2023

No. 7 – Houston Texans
- Position: Quarterback
- Roster status: Active

Personal information
- Born: October 3, 2001 (age 25); Rancho Cucamonga, California, U.S.
- Listed height: 6 ft 3 in (1.91 m)
- Listed weight: 218 lb (99 kg)

Career information
- High school: Rancho Cucamonga
- College: Ohio State (2020–2022)
- NFL draft: 2023: 1st round, 2nd overall pick

Career history
- Houston Texans (2023–present)

Awards and highlights
- NFL Offensive Rookie of the Year (2023); Pro Bowl (2023); NCAA passer rating leader (2022); Second-team All-American (2022); 2× Big Ten Offensive Player of the Year (2021, 2022)

Career NFL statistics as of Week 11, 2026
- Passing attempts: 1,801
- Passing completions: 1,150
- Completion percentage: 63.9%
- TD–INT: 84–29
- Passing yards: 13,532
- Passer rating: 95.4
- Rushing yards: 756
- Rushing touchdowns: 5
- Stats at Pro Football Reference

Coleridge Bernard "C. J." Stroud IV (born October 3, 2001) is an American professional football quarterback for the Houston Texans of the National Football League (NFL). Stroud played college football for the Ohio State Buckeyes, where he holds several school records, including most passing yards in a single game with 573, as well as being the first player to throw for six touchdowns three times. He was a Heisman Trophy finalist in 2021 and 2022, and was subsequently selected by the Houston Texans second overall in the 2023 NFL draft. In his rookie season, he led the Texans to a division title and playoff victory en route to winning the Offensive Rookie of the Year Award.

== Early life ==
Stroud was born on October 3, 2001, in Rancho Cucamonga, California, the youngest of four children. In 2014, Stroud joined Snoop Dogg's Snoop Youth Football League aged 12 and played as a quarterback in the league for two years.

In 2016, his father, Coleridge Bernard Stroud III, received a 38-years-to-life sentence after pleading guilty to kidnapping, carjacking and robbery in connection with a drug-related incident under California's three-strikes law. As of 2023, his father has been incarcerated since Stroud was in middle school, and is serving his sentence in Folsom State Prison near Sacramento. The incarceration sent the Stroud family into severe financial debt; they lived in a small apartment above a storage facility as Stroud entered Rancho Cucamonga High School.

As a senior, he was the Inland Valley Daily Bulletin offensive player of the year after passing for 3,878 yards and 47 touchdowns. In 2019, he was the MVP of the Elite 11. Stroud was selected to play in the 2020 All-American Bowl. Initially considered a 3-star recruit, Stroud finished high school as the third-highest rated quarterback of his class. He committed to Ohio State University to play college football.

Stroud has been friends with Carolina Panthers quarterback Bryce Young since the two went to high schools located in Southern California. The two continued their friendship in college, and ultimately were selected with the first two picks in the 2023 NFL draft.

== College career ==
=== 2020 season ===
Stroud spent his true freshman year at Ohio State redshirting as a backup to Justin Fields. He played just eight snaps in 2020, throwing no passes, but did score a 48-yard rushing touchdown against Michigan State. He also played one snap in the 2021 Sugar Bowl against Clemson after Fields took a hard hit to the ribs.

=== 2021 season ===
Stroud was named the starting quarterback as a redshirt freshman following the departure of Fields to the 2021 NFL draft. He was chosen over freshmen Kyle McCord, Quinn Ewers, and fellow redshirt freshman Jack Miller III. Coach Ryan Day credited his decision-making, leadership skills, and accuracy as the reasons that he earned the starting spot.

Stroud started every game for the Buckeyes aside from a week 4 game against Akron in order to rest a shoulder injury he sustained in the season opener. Over the season, he earned first-team All-Big Ten Honors; was named the Big Ten quarterback of the year; won Big Ten Freshman of the Week six times; was a finalist for both the Davey O'Brien Award and the Heisman Trophy; and became the only quarterback in Ohio State history to throw five touchdowns against a Big Ten competitor four times in one season. He led the team to a 10–2 record in the regular season, with losses to Oregon and bitter rival Michigan. The loss to Michigan cost Ohio State the chance to play in the Big Ten Championship. Ohio State bounced back from this disappointment at the Rose Bowl; coming back from a 14-point deficit against Utah to win 48–45. Stroud broke both school and Rose Bowl records with 573 yards thrown in the Rose Bowl; he also tied a school record and set a Rose Bowl record with six touchdown passes. He finished fourth in Heisman Trophy voting.

=== 2022 season ===
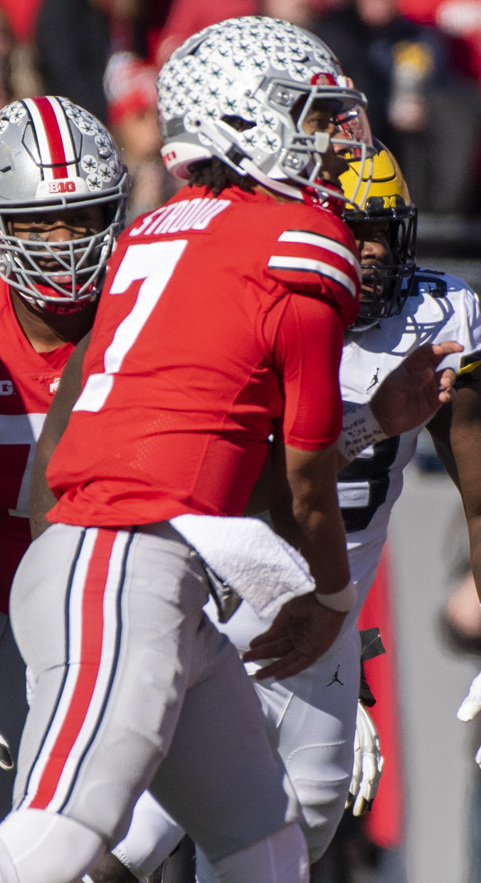
Stroud against the Michigan Wolverines in 2022

Following a successful 2021 season, Stroud entered 2022 as one of the best players in college football, as well as the betting favorite to win the Heisman Trophy. On October 8, 2022, Stroud threw six touchdown passes against Michigan State, setting a conference record for “most six passing touchdown games in a career” (with 3), and passed Justin Fields to move to second place on the Ohio State career passing touchdowns list. Stroud and the Buckeyes once again came up short against rival Michigan in their annual meeting, this time losing at home in Columbus 45–23. Despite the loss, the Buckeyes were selected as the fourth and final team for the College Football Playoff. In the Peach Bowl semifinal against the top-seeded Georgia Bulldogs, Stroud had a strong performance, throwing for 348 yards and four touchdowns, but the Buckeyes lost 42–41, ending their season. At the conclusion of the regular season, he led the NCAA with a passer rating of 177.7 and was again was named a finalist for the Heisman trophy. He finished third in the voting behind winner Caleb Williams from USC and Max Duggan from TCU. On January 16, 2023, Stroud announced that he would forgo his remaining two years of college eligibility and enter the 2023 NFL draft.

== Professional career ==
Pre-draft measurables
Height	Weight	Arm length	Hand span	Wingspan
6 ft 3 in (1.91 m)	214 lb (97 kg)	32 5/8 in (0.83 m)	10 in (0.25 m)	6 ft 5 3/8 in (1.97 m)
All values from the NFL Combine

=== 2023 season ===
Stroud was selected by the Houston Texans with the second overall pick in the 2023 NFL draft on April 27, 2023. Being second overall, Stroud became the highest drafted quarterback in Ohio State's history. On July 24, 2023 he signed to a four-year, $36.3 million fully guaranteed rookie contract.

On September 10, 2023, Stroud made his NFL debut in week 1 against the Baltimore Ravens, where he threw for 242 yards in the 25–9 loss. During week 2 against the Indianapolis Colts, Stroud threw his first two NFL touchdowns, one to Nico Collins and the other to Tank Dell, and finished with 384 passing yards in the 31–20 loss. Stroud's 384 yards are the second-most in a single game by a Texans rookie quarterback. The following week, against the Jacksonville Jaguars, Stroud finished 20-of-30 for 280 yards with two touchdowns as the Texans won 37–17 for his first career win. He also joined Cam Newton and Justin Herbert as the only players in NFL history to put up at least 900 passing yards in their first three games. Stroud was named the Offensive Rookie of the Month for September, finishing the month with 78 completions on 121 attempts with 906 yards and four touchdowns with no interceptions.

In week 5, Stroud threw his 177th pass attempt without an interception, breaking the previous NFL record set by Dak Prescott for the most pass attempts without an interception to begin a career in NFL history in a 21–19 loss to the Atlanta Falcons. The streak ended the following week against the New Orleans Saints at 191 attempts; Saints linebacker Zack Baun intercepted the pass but had the ball punched out by wide receiver Nico Collins with offensive tackle Tytus Howard recovering the ball for the Texans. In week 8, Stroud faced his friend and fellow top draft pick Bryce Young for the first time in the NFL. Young came out on top in a defensive battle, 15–13. Stroud threw for 140 yards and had his first rushing touchdown in the loss. In week 9, Stroud passed for 470 yards, breaking the single-game passing yard record for a rookie quarterback that was previously set by Andrew Luck in 2012. Stroud also passed for five touchdowns, during a 39–37 comeback victory over the Tampa Bay Buccaneers. The game also marked just the third time in NFL history a quarterback has thrown for at least 470 yards and five touchdowns with no interceptions, joining Y.A. Tittle and Ben Roethlisberger. He was named both AFC Offensive Player of the Month and NFL Rookie of the Month for November becoming the fifth player ever to earn both awards in the same month.

In week 14 against the New York Jets, Stroud suffered a concussion during the fourth quarter as the Texans lost 30–6. After a two-game absence, Stroud made his return in week 17 against the Tennessee Titans, completing 24 of 32 passes for 213 yards and one touchdown in a 26–3 victory. In a win-or-go-home situation against the Colts, Stroud completed 20 of 26 passes for 264 yards and two touchdowns in a 23–19 win, clinching the Texans' first playoff berth since 2019. His performance earned him AFC Offensive Player of the Week. During this game, Stroud became just the fifth quarterback in NFL history to pass for over 4,000 yards in their rookie season. Stroud also became the third player in league history to lead the league in passing yards per game (273.9) and touchdown/interception ratio (4.6) in the same season, joining Tom Brady in 2007 and Joe Montana in 1989. He was named to the PFWA All-Rookie Team. He was named the NFL Offensive Rookie of the Year.

In his playoff debut against the Cleveland Browns in the Wild Card round, Stroud tied the rookie record for most passing touchdowns in a playoff game and became the youngest quarterback to win a playoff game in league history as the Texans won 45–14. Stroud finished the game completing 16 of 21 passes for 274 yards, three touchdowns, and a near-perfect passer rating of 157.2. In the Divisional round against the top-seeded Ravens in a rematch of week 1, Stroud was held in check, completing 19 of 33 passes for 175 yards and a 72.2 rating as the Texans lost, 34–10. He was ranked 20th by his fellow players on the NFL Top 100 Players of 2024.

=== 2024 season ===
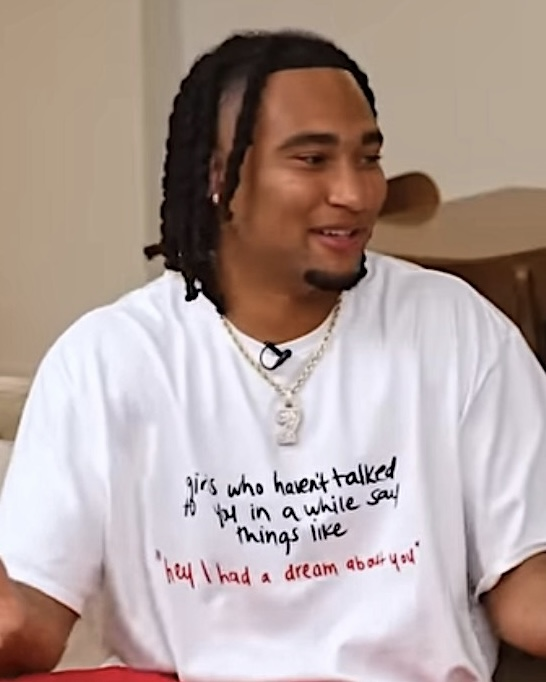
Stroud in 2024

Stroud began the season by leading the Texans to back-to-back victories over the Indianapolis Colts and Chicago Bears, throwing for a combined 494 yards, three touchdowns, and no turnovers. In week 4 against the Jacksonville Jaguars, Stroud passed for 345 yards and two touchdowns, leading the Texans on a nine-play, 69-yard touchdown drive with under 20 seconds remaining to secure a 24–20 victory. In week 6, Stroud threw for 192 yards with three touchdowns in the 41–21 win over the New England Patriots, improving to 5–1 on the season.

Despite a strong start, Stroud faced challenges during his sophomore season. In week 7 against the Green Bay Packers, Stroud completed under half his passes for 86 yards in a 24–22 loss. Against the New York Jets in week 9, Stroud completed only 11-of-30 passes and was sacked eight times in a 21–13 loss. On Sunday Night Football in week 10, he recorded 232 passing yards and a touchdown but threw two interceptions to Detroit Lions cornerback Carlton Davis as the Texans lost 26–23, despite leading 23–7 at one point. Stroud threw two more interceptions in a week 12 upset loss to the Titans as the Texans dropped to 7–5.

On Christmas Day against the Baltimore Ravens, Stroud had one of the worst outings of his career, completing 54.8% of his passes for 185 yards and an interception in a 31–2 loss. His passer rating of 59.2 was one of the lowest of his career. Stroud finished his second season with 3,727 yards, a 63.2 completion percentage, 20 touchdowns, 12 interceptions, an 87.0 passer rating, and 52 sacks, all of which were a decline from his breakout rookie campaign. Despite a 5–6 finish to the season, the Texans were still able to clinch their second consecutive AFC South title. In the Wild Card round against the Los Angeles Chargers, Stroud completed 22 of 33 passes, accompanied with a touchdown and an interception as he led the Texans to a 32–12 home victory including a busted play in the second quarter where Stroud recovered a botched snap near his own end zone and connected with Xavier Hutchinson for a 34-yard gain. Stroud and the Texans saw their season end once again in the Divisional Round, this time being a 23–14 loss to the Chiefs. He was ranked 39th by his fellow players on the NFL Top 100 Players of 2025.

=== 2025 season ===
In Week 5, Stroud completed 23 of 27 passes for 244 yards and four touchdowns in a 44–10 win over the Baltimore Ravens, earning AFC Offensive Player of the Week.

In a 18–15 loss to the Denver Broncos in Week 9, Stroud got hit hard by Kris Abrams-Draine early in the 2nd quarter, which gave him a concussion. He missed the next three games. Stroud finished 2025 with 3,041 yards, 19 touchdowns, and 8 interceptions for a passer rating of 92.9. In the wild card round against the Pittsburgh Steelers, Stroud threw for 250 yards, accompanied by a touchdown and an interception in the 30–6 road victory. In the divisional round matchup vs the New England Patriots, Stroud struggled heavily, completing 20 for 47 passes for 212 yards with one touchdown and four interceptions in a 28–16 loss. Stroud's 4 first-half interceptions were tied for the most in an NFL playoff game since Jake Delhomme threw 5 in 2008.

=== 2026 season ===
On April 8, 2026, the Texans exercised the fifth-year option on Stroud’s contract. In Week 6 against the Jacksonville Jaguars, Stroud went 24 of 30 for 312 yards, three touchdowns and a 116.3 passer rating, earning AFC Offensive Player of the Week. In Week 9 against the Los Angeles Chargers, Stroud earned a 125.5 passer rating while completing 21-of-35 (60.0%) passes for 384 yards and five touchdowns in the 44-22 victory, earning him AFC Offensive Player of the Week.

== Career statistics ==
Legend
	Led the league
**Bold**	Career high

=== NFL ===
==== Regular season ====
Year	Team	Games			Passing										Rushing					Sacks		Fumbles	
Year	Team	GP	GS	Record	Cmp	Att	Pct	Yds	Y/A	Y/G	Lng	TD	Int	Rtg	Att	Yds	Avg	Lng	TD	Sck	SckY	Fum	Lost
2023	HOU	15	15	9–6	319	499	63.9	**4,108**	**8.2**	**273.9**	**75**	**23**	5	**100.8**	39	167	4.3	16	**3**	38	331	**8**	**4**
2024	HOU	17	17	10–7	**336**	**532**	63.2	3,727	7.0	219.2	67	20	**12**	87.0	**52**	**233**	**4.5**	25	0	**52**	**408**	6	**4**
2025	HOU	14	14	**9–5**	273	423	64.5	3,041	7.2	217.2	**75**	19	8	92.9	48	209	4.4	**30**	1	23	189	2	0
2026	HOU	10	10	4–6	222	347	**64.0**	2,656	7.7	265.6	63	22	4	103.6	29	147	5.1	15	1	18	119	3	2
Career		56	56	32–24	1,150	1,801	63.9	13,532	7.5	241.6	75	84	29	95.4	168	756	4.5	30	5	131	1,047	19	10

==== Postseason ====
Year	Team	Games			Passing										Rushing					Sacks		Fumbles	
Year	Team	GP	GS	Record	Cmp	Att	Pct	Yds	Y/A	Y/G	Lng	TD	Int	Rtg	Att	Yds	Avg	Lng	TD	Sck	SckY	Fum	Lost
2023	HOU	2	2	1–1	35	54	64.8	449	8.3	224.5	**76**	**3**	0	**109.3**	4	10	2.5	7	0	0	0	0	0
2024	HOU	2	2	1–1	**41**	61	**67.2**	**527**	**8.6**	**263.5**	41	1	1	92.7	**12**	**84**	**7.0**	**28**	0	**11**	**79**	2	0
2025	HOU	2	2	1–1	**41**	**79**	51.9	462	5.8	231.0	46	2	**5**	51.7	3	11	3.7	10	0	6	25	**5**	**2**
Career		6	6	3–3	117	194	60.3	1,438	7.4	239.7	76	6	6	80.6	19	105	5.5	28	0	17	104	7	2

=== College ===
Legend
Led the NCAA

College statistics
Season	Team	Games			Passing								Rushing			
Season	Team	GP	GS	Record	Cmp	Att	Pct	Yds	Avg	TD	Int	Rtg	Att	Yds	Avg	TD
2020	Ohio State	3	0	—	0	0	0.0	0	0.0	0	0	0.0	1	48	**48.0**	**1**
2021	Ohio State	12	12	10–2	**317**	**441**	**71.9**	**4,435**	**10.1**	**44**	**6**	**186.6**	32	−20	−0.6	0
2022	Ohio State	13	13	**11–2**	258	389	66.3	3,688	9.5	41	**6**	177.7	**47**	**108**	2.3	0
Career		28	25	21–4	575	830	69.3	8,123	9.8	85	12	182.4	80	136	1.7	1

== Career highlights ==
=== Awards and honors ===
NFL

- NFL Offensive Rookie of the Year (2023)
- Pro Bowl (2023)
- PFWA All-Rookie Team (2023)
- 4× AFC Offensive Player of the Week (2023: Week 9, 2025: Week 5, 2026: Week 6, Week 9)
- 2× NFL Offensive Rookie of the Month (2023: September, November)
- AFC Offensive Player of the Month (2023: November)
- PFWA Good Guy Award (2024)
- Ranked No. 20 in the Top 100 Players of 2024
- Ranked No. 39 in the Top 100 Players of 2025

College

- Second-team All-American (2022)
- Third-team All-American (2021)
- NCAA passer rating leader (2022)
- 2× Big Ten Offensive Player of the Year (2021, 2022)
- 2× Big Ten Quarterback of the Year (2021, 2022)
- Big Ten Freshman of the Year (2021)
- 2× First-team All-Big Ten (2021, 2022)

=== Records ===
==== NFL records ====
- Youngest starting quarterback to win a playoff game: 22 years, 3 months and 10 days
- Most passing attempts without an interception to start a career: 191 (2023)
- Most games with at least 350 passing yards by a rookie: 3 (tied) (2023)
- Most passing yards in a single game by a rookie: 470 (November 5, 2023, vs. Tampa Bay Buccaneers)
- Most passing touchdowns in a single game by a rookie: 5 (tied) (November 5, 2023, vs. Tampa Bay Buccaneers)

==== Texans franchise records ====
- Most playoff wins for a quarterback: 3
- Most passing yards in a rookie season: 4,108 (2023)
- Most passing touchdowns in a rookie season: 23 (2023)
- Most passing completions in a rookie season: 319 (2023)
- Most passing attempts in a rookie season: 499 (2023)

== Personal life ==
Stroud is the son of Coleridge and Kimberly Stroud. He has two older brothers and one older sister. Stroud has spoken publicly about his Christian faith and is known to say: “First and foremost I’ve got to thank my Lord and Savior Jesus Christ” during interviews.
