= Dwayne Haskins =

American football player (1997–2022)

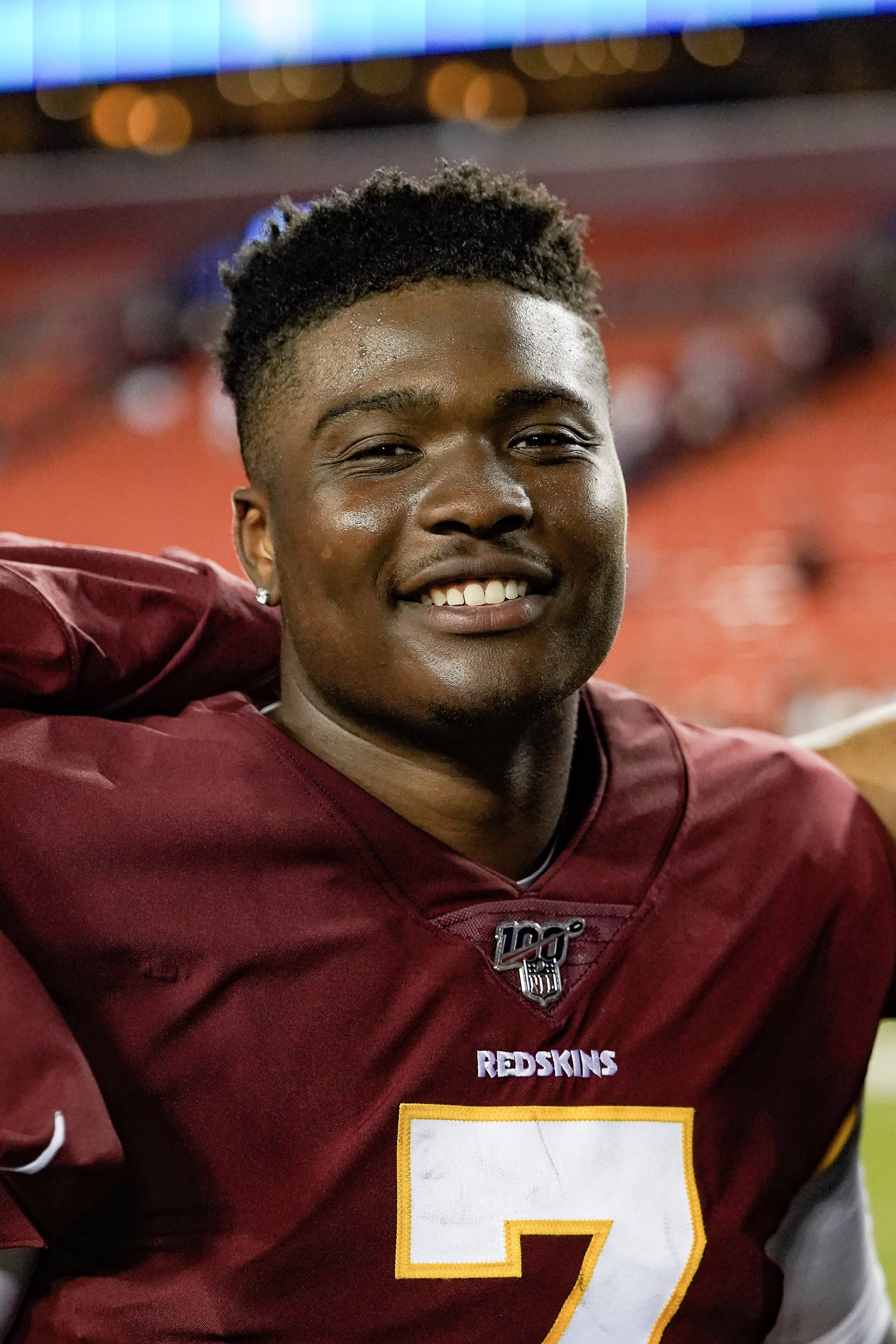
- Haskins with the Washington Redskins in 2019

No. 7, 3
- Position: Quarterback

Personal information
- Born: May 3, 1997; Highland Park, New Jersey, U.S.
- Died: April 9, 2022 (aged 24); Fort Lauderdale, Florida, U.S.
- Listed height: 6 ft 4 in (1.93 m)
- Listed weight: 230 lb (104 kg)

Career information
- High school: Bullis (Potomac, Maryland)
- College: Ohio State (2016–2018)
- NFL draft: 2019: 1st round, 15th overall pick

Career history
- Washington Redskins / Football Team (2019–2020); Pittsburgh Steelers (2021)

Awards and highlights
- Sammy Baugh Trophy (2018); Chic Harley Award (2018); Kellen Moore Award (2018); Third-team All-American (2018); NCAA passing yards leader (2018); NCAA passing touchdowns leader (2018); Big Ten Most Valuable Player (2018)

Career NFL statistics
- Passing attempts: 444
- Passing completions: 267
- Completion percentage: 60.1%
- TD–INT: 12–14
- Passing yards: 2,804
- Passer rating: 74.4
- Stats at Pro Football Reference

Dwayne Haskins Jr. (May 3, 1997 – April 9, 2022) was an American professional football quarterback who played in the National Football League (NFL) for three seasons. Haskins played college football for the Ohio State Buckeyes, setting Big Ten Conference records for single season passing yards and passing touchdowns and leading the NCAA in both as a sophomore in 2018. He won the Sammy Baugh Trophy, the Chic Harley and Kellen Moore awards, and Big Ten Most Valuable Player.

Haskins was selected by the Washington Redskins in the first round of the 2019 NFL draft, but was released after less than two seasons due to inconsistent play and questions about his work ethic. He signed with the Pittsburgh Steelers in 2021 and served as a backup until his death the following offseason when he was fatally struck by a vehicle in southern Florida.

== Early life ==
Born in Highland Park, New Jersey, Haskins and his family moved to Potomac, Maryland, when he was in the ninth grade. There, he attended and played football at Bullis School from 2013 to 2016, where he passed for 5,308 yards and 54 touchdowns. He originally committed to the University of Maryland over Rutgers University to play college football, but later decided to attend Ohio State University after Maryland football coach Randy Edsall was fired mid-season.

== College career ==
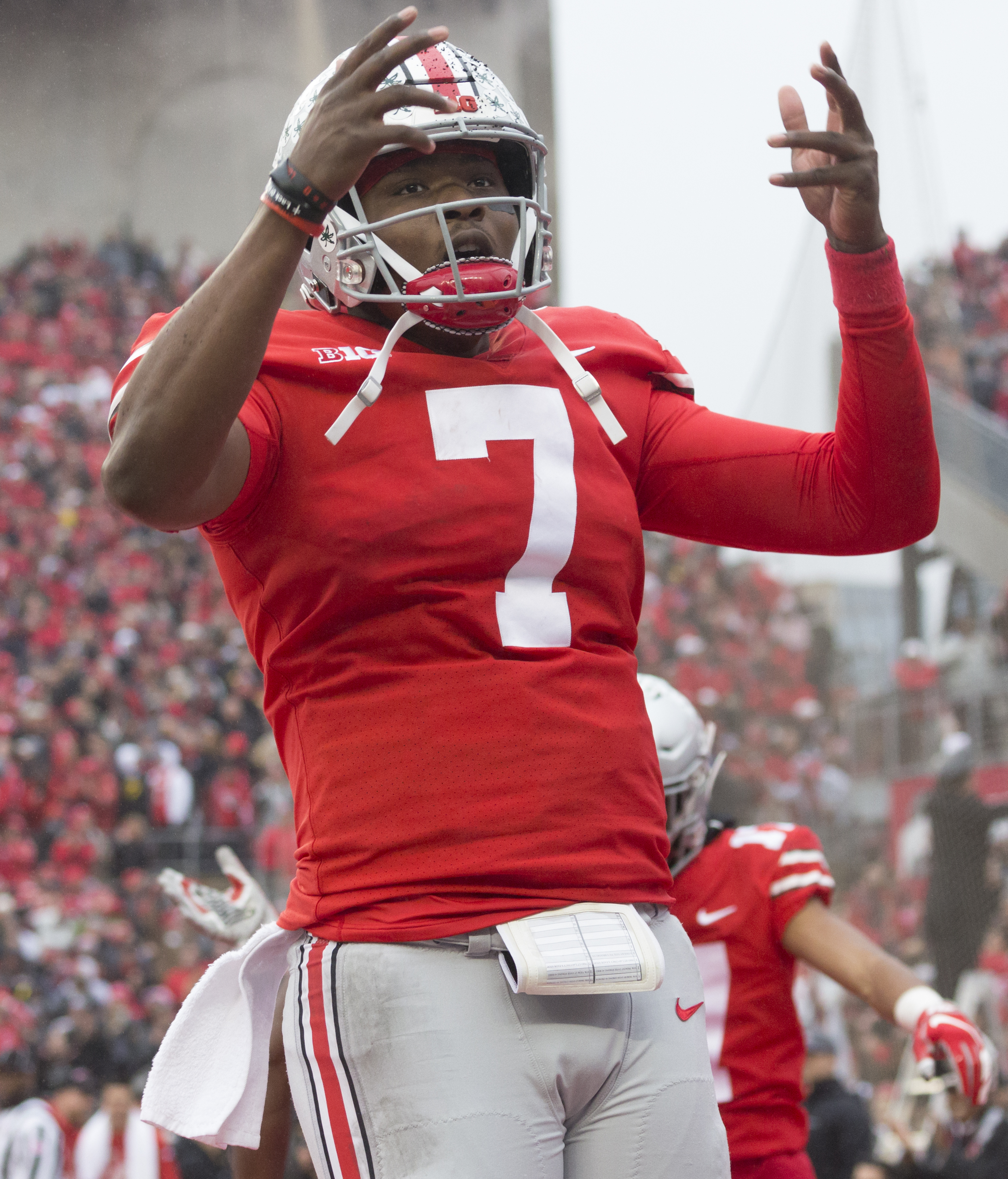
Haskins with Ohio State in 2018

Haskins redshirted his first year with the Buckeyes in 2016. The following year, he was the backup to J. T. Barrett. He finished the season completing 40 of 57 passes for 565 yards and four touchdowns. In the 2017 annual rivalry matchup with Michigan, Haskins entered the game in the third quarter after Barrett suffered a leg injury. Haskins helped the Buckeyes overcome a six point deficit to win 31-20. Haskins then went on to have a record-setting campaign in his sophomore season in 2018, which was his lone starting season at the school. He threw for an NCAA-leading 4,831 yards and 50 touchdowns, claiming the single-season passing and touchdown records for both Ohio State and the Big Ten, and becoming just one of eight NCAA quarterbacks to reach 50 touchdown passes in a season.

Additionally, he claimed school records in total offense in a season (4,900+ yards), total offensive yards in a game (477) and total passing yards in a game (470). In all 12 of his starts, he threw for more than 225 passing yards, including eight games of more than 300 yards, and four games of more than 400. He threw for 499 yards and five touchdowns in the 2018 Big Ten Football Championship Game, while throwing three touchdowns in the 2019 Rose Bowl, winning the MVP award in both games for his performance.

His performance also earned him first-team All–Big Ten honors, as well as six Big Ten Offensive Player of the Week awards, the Graham–George Offensive Player of the Year, the Griese–Brees Quarterback of the Year, the Chicago Tribune Silver Football, and the Male Ohio State Athlete of the Year awards. He was also named as a semifinalist for the Maxwell Award, and finished third in the Heisman Trophy voting. In January 2019, Haskins announced that he would forgo his remaining two years of college football and enter the 2019 NFL draft. As a student, he majored in journalism.

== Professional career ==
Pre-draft measurables
Height	Weight	Arm length	Hand span	Wingspan	40-yard dash	10-yard split	20-yard split	Vertical jump	Wonderlic
6 ft 3 3/8 in (1.91 m)	231 lb (105 kg)	33 1/2 in (0.85 m)	9 5/8 in (0.24 m)	6 ft 7 1/2 in (2.02 m)	5.04 s	1.68 s	2.90 s	28.5 in (0.72 m)	25
All values from NFL Combine

=== Washington Redskins / Football Team ===
==== 2019 season ====
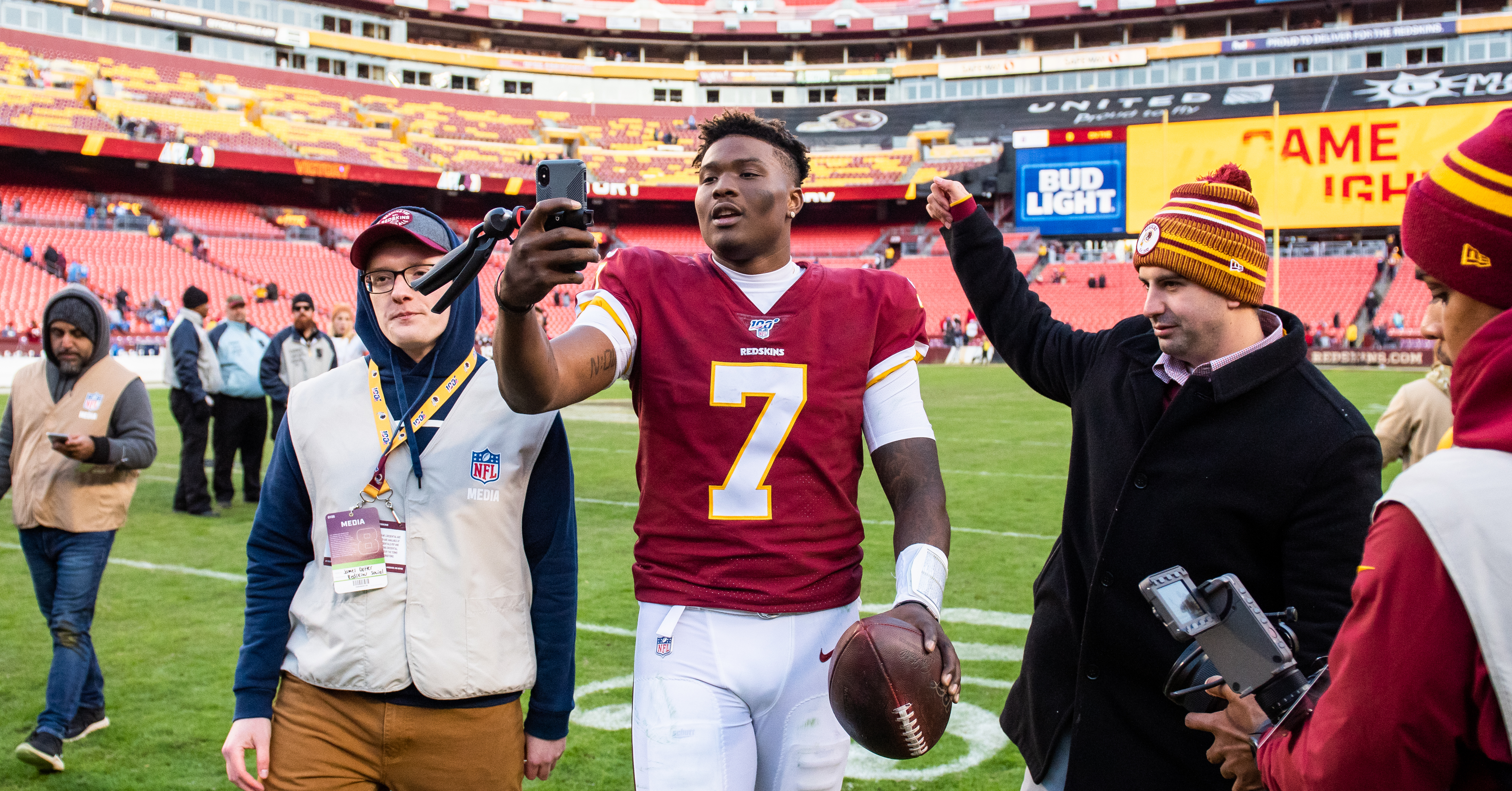
Haskins after his first win as a starting NFL quarterback, 2019

Haskins was selected by the Washington Redskins in the first round of the 2019 NFL draft, 15th overall. Despite his high school and college jersey number of 7 being unofficially retired by the Redskins in honor of quarterback Joe Theismann, whose career ended with a leg injury in 1985, Haskins requested and was granted permission from him to wear it. Haskins signed his four-year rookie contract on May 9, 2019, worth $14.37 million, including an $8.47 million signing bonus.

Haskins saw his first action with the team in a Week 4 game against the New York Giants in relief of Case Keenum, who was benched for poor performance. In the game, Haskins also struggled, throwing for 107 yards and three interceptions, including a pick-six, as the Redskins lost 24–3. During a Week 8 game against the Minnesota Vikings, Haskins again replaced Keenum, who left the game due to a concussion. He finished the game with 33 passing yards and an interception as the Redskins lost 19–9. The following week Haskins made his first career start against the Buffalo Bills, finishing with 144 passing yards as the team lost 24–9.

Haskins' first win as a starter came during Week 12 against the Detroit Lions, where he finished with 156 passing yards, 28 rushing yards, and an interception in the 19–16 victory. He was criticized for his work ethic when late in the game, he was posing for a selfie with fans so the substitute quarterback was sent in. For his efforts, he was named the Pepsi NFL Rookie of the Week. In Week 16 against the Giants, Haskins threw for 133 yards and two touchdowns before being carted off the field due to an ankle injury suffered on the first play of the third quarter, which also made him miss the following week's game.

==== 2020 season ====
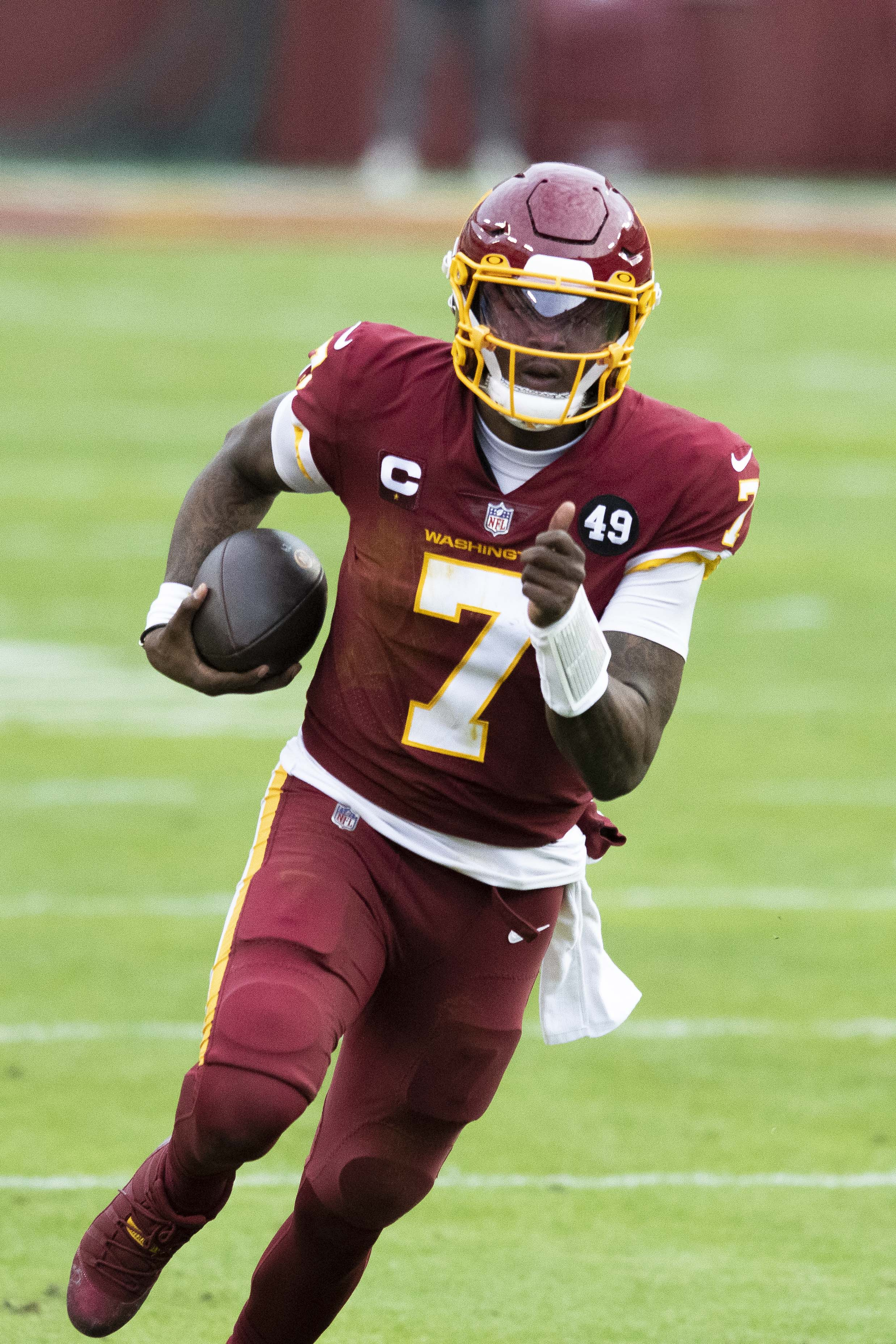
Haskins running with the ball against the Seahawks

Prior to the 2020 season, Haskins lost around seven-percent in total body fat and was named the starter and one of the team captains. In a Week 3 loss against the Cleveland Browns, Haskins threw three interceptions and lost a fumble. The following week against the Baltimore Ravens, he threw for a career-high 314 yards in another loss. Haskins was benched in favor of Kyle Allen prior to the Week 5 game against the Los Angeles Rams due to coaches being unimpressed with his work ethic and performance. In October 2020, he was fined US$4,833 for breaking league COVID-19 protocols after making a reservation for a family friend at the team hotel in New York prior to a game against the Giants.

Haskins remained as the team's backup until the Week 14 game against the San Francisco 49ers, where he played in the second half after Alex Smith left the game due to a calf strain. He then started the following week's game against the Seattle Seahawks because Smith had yet to recover from his injury. In the game, Haskins threw for 295 yards and one touchdown with two interceptions during a 20–15 loss. Following the game, Haskins was photographed attending his girlfriend's birthday party without wearing a face mask. Due to breaking COVID-19 protocols again, he was fined $40,000 by the team and lost his status as a captain. Despite that, he started the Week 16 game against the Carolina Panthers but was benched for Taylor Heinicke in the fourth quarter after throwing 14 of 28 for 154 yards and two interceptions, finishing with a passer rating of 36.9 in a 20–13 loss. Haskins was released by the team the day after, with head coach Ron Rivera saying he believed that it benefited both parties if they went their separate ways.

=== Pittsburgh Steelers ===
Haskins signed with the Pittsburgh Steelers on January 21, 2021. He was named the third-string quarterback behind Ben Roethlisberger and Mason Rudolph and was inactive for all but one game that season. Haskins signed a one-year, restricted free agent tender by the team on March 16, 2022.

== Career statistics ==
=== NFL ===
Year	Team	Games			Passing								Rushing			
Year	Team	GP	GS	Record	Cmp	Att	Pct	Yds	Avg	TD	Int	Rtg	Att	Yds	Avg	TD
2019	WAS	9	7	2–5	119	203	58.6	1,365	6.7	7	7	76.1	20	101	5.1	0
2020	WAS	7	6	1–5	148	241	61.4	1,439	6.0	5	7	73.0	20	46	2.3	1
2021	PIT	Did not play														
Career		16	13	3–10	267	444	60.1	2,804	6.3	12	14	74.4	40	147	3.7	1

=== College ===
Legend
	Led the NCAA
**Bold**	Career high

Season	Games			Passing								Rushing			
Season	GP	GS	Record	Cmp	Att	Pct	Yds	Avg	TD	Int	Rtg	Att	Yds	Avg	TD
2016	0	0	—	Redshirt											
2017	8	0	—	40	57	**70.2**	565	**9.9**	4	1	173.1	24	86	**3.6**	0
2018	**14**	**14**	**13–1**	**373**	**533**	70.0	**4,831**	9.1	**50**	**8**	**174.1**	**79**	**108**	1.4	**4**
Career	22	14	13–1	413	590	70.0	5,396	9.1	54	9	174.0	103	194	1.9	4

== Personal life ==
Haskins was a Christian and was married to Kalabrya Gondrezick-Haskins, a former Michigan State Spartans women's basketball player, and the daughter of former NBA player Grant Gondrezick. His mentor during high school and college was NFL wide receiver Mohamed Sanu, whom he met through Mohamed Jabbie, one of his best friends and Sanu's nephew. A New Jersey native, Haskins grew up a New York Giants fan.

Haskins went by the nickname Simba, taken from the protagonist of the 1994 film The Lion King. He adopted it as a child due to his having an afro at the time that reminded his mother of a lion's mane. He used the nickname and the film's coming-of-age story as motivation and incorporated it into his personal clothing brand, Kingdom of Pride.

== Death ==
Haskins died as a direct result of injuries he sustained at around 7:00 a.m. EDT on April 9, 2022, after he was struck by a dump truck while attempting to cross I-595 near Fort Lauderdale, Florida, on foot. He was in Florida to train with several of his Steelers teammates. His wife, who was not traveling with him, received a call from Haskins after he had run out of gasoline for his rented vehicle, letting her know of his attempt to get more at a gas station prior to being struck. Haskins was knocked back several feet by a dump truck and either run over or struck a second time by an SUV that swerved in an attempt to avoid him. A toxicology report revealed Haskins had a blood alcohol level of .24 and had also tested positive for ketamine, and norketamine.

A lawsuit filed about the incident claims that Haskins was drugged and robbed by a group that contained one man and three women prior to his death. It accuses the dump truck of speeding, operating carelessly, and violating weight limit regulations, and also claims the rental truck driven by Haskins had a defect that led to it running out of gas.

== See also ==
- List of gridiron football players who died during their careers
