= Marcus Marek =

American football player (born 1961)

No. 56
- Position: Linebacker

Personal information
- Born: January 8, 1961 (age 65); Masury, Ohio, U.S.
- Listed height: 6 ft 2 in (1.88 m)
- Listed weight: 225 lb (102 kg)

Career information
- High school: Brookfield (Brookfield, Ohio)
- College: Ohio State (1979–1982)
- NFL draft: 1983: undrafted

Career history
- Boston/New Orleans/Portland Breakers (1983–1985); Chicago Bears (1985)*; Cleveland Browns (1986)*; Toronto Argonauts (1986)*; New Orleans Saints (1987)
- * Offseason or practice squad member only

Awards and highlights
- All-USFL (1983); Consensus All-American (1982); 2× Second-team All-American (1980, 1981); 3× First-team All-Big Ten (1980–1982)

Marcus Marek (born January 8, 1961) is an American former football linebacker. He played college football at Ohio State University and was a consensus All-American in 1982. He is the career leader in tackles for Ohio State. Marek played professionally with the Boston/New Orleans/Portland Breakers of the United States Football League (USFL) from 1983 to 1985.

== Early life ==
Marcus Marek was born on January 8, 1961, in Masury, Ohio. He attended Brookfield High School in Brookfield, Ohio.

== College career ==
Marek was a four-year letterman for the Ohio State Buckeyes of Ohio State University from 1979 to 1982. He recorded three interceptions in 1979, four interceptions in 1980, one interception in 1981, and three interceptions in 1982. He earned both Associated Press (AP) and United Press International (UPI) first-team All-Big Ten honors for three straight years from 1980 to 1982. In 1980, Marek was named a third-team All-American by the AP and a second-team All-American by UPI. In 1981, he was named a second-team All-American by both the AP and UPI. He earned consensus All-American recognition his senior year in 1982. Marek is Ohio State's all-time leader in tackles with 572. He was inducted into Ohio State's athletics hall of fame in 1999.

== Professional career ==
Marek was selected by the Boston Breakers of the United States Football League (USFL) in the ninth round, with the 107th overall pick, of the 1983 USFL draft. He officially signed with the Breakers on February 26, 1983. He went undrafted in the 1983 NFL draft. Marek started all 18 games for the Breakers during the USFL's inaugural 1983 season, recording 240 tackles, one sack, four interceptions, and three fumble recoveries that he returned for 89 yards and one touchdown. The Breakers finished the year with an 11–7 record. Marek garnered All-USFL honors for his performance during the 1983 season. He signed a multi-year contract renewal with the New Orleans Breakers on April 28, 1984. He played in 17 games during the 1984 season, totaling one interception, one sack, and six fumble recoveries. Marek only appeared in eight games for the Portland Breakers in 1985 due to a knee injury.

Marek signed with the Chicago Bears on August 8, 1985. He was released on August 26, 1985.

Marek was signed by the Cleveland Browns on May 4, 1986. He was cut by the Browns on August 13, 1986.

On August 27, 1986, it was reported that Marek had been signed to the practice roster of the Toronto Argonauts of the Canadian Football League. On April 21, 1987, he signed a multi-year contract with Toronto. He pulled his hamstring in June 1987. Marek was released on June 19, 1987, before the start of the season.

On September 25, 1987, it was announced that Marek had signed with the New Orleans Saints during the 1987 NFL players strike. However, he did not play in any games due to a hamstring injury. He was released on October 19, 1987, after the strike ended.

== See also ==
- Ohio State Buckeyes football statistical leaders
