= List of second overall NFL draft picks =

This is a list of second overall National Football League (NFL) draft picks. The NFL draft is an annual sports draft in which National Football League teams select newly eligible players for their rosters. Thirteen players selected second overall have been inducted into the Pro Football Hall of Fame: Sid Luckman (1939), George McAfee (1940), Les Richter (1952), Bob Brown (1964), Tom Mack (1966), Randy White (1975), Tony Dorsett (1977), Lawrence Taylor (1981), Eric Dickerson (1983), Marshall Faulk (1994), Tony Boselli (1995), Julius Peppers (2002), and Calvin Johnson (2007). In 2012, Sports Illustrated chose Taylor as the best player selected second overall.

Nine Heisman Trophy winners have been selected at the spot: Glenn Davis (1946), Billy Vessels (1952), John David Crow (1957), Tony Dorsett (1977), Reggie Bush (2006), Robert Griffin III (2012), Marcus Mariota (2014), Jayden Daniels (2024), and Travis Hunter (2025). The Cleveland / St. Louis / Los Angeles Rams and Arizona Cardinals have each had nine selections at the spot, the most in the NFL.

== List ==
Key

K	Kicker	NT	Nose tackle	C	Center
LB	Linebacker	FB	Fullback	DB	Defensive back
P	Punter	HB	Halfback	DE	Defensive end
QB	Quarterback	WR/E	Wide receiver / end	DT	Defensive tackle
G	Guard	T	Offensive tackle	TE	Tight end

*	Selected to a Pro Bowl
‡	Inducted into the Pro Football Hall of Fame

List of second overall picks
Year	Name	Position	College	NFL team	Notes
1936	Riley Smith	QB	Alabama	Boston Redskins	College Football Hall of Fame
1937	Ed Goddard	QB/HB	Washington State	Brooklyn Dodgers	
1938	Jim McDonald	HB	Ohio State	Philadelphia Eagles	
1939	Sid Luckman^{‡}	QB	Columbia	Chicago Bears	Pro Football Hall of Fame
1940	George McAfee^{‡}	HB	Duke	Philadelphia Eagles	Pro Football Hall of Fame
1941	John Kimbrough	FB	Texas A&M	Chicago Cardinals	College Football Hall of Fame
1942	Jack Wilson	HB	Baylor	Cleveland Rams	Appeared in only 10 NFL games, 3 as a starter
1943	Joe Muha	FB	VMI	Philadelphia Eagles	2x All-Pro
1944	Pat Harder*	FB	Wisconsin	Chicago Cardinals	3× first-team All-Pro; College Football Hall of Fame
1945	Paul Duhart	QB/HB	Florida	Pittsburgh Steelers	Appeared in only 13 NFL games, 7 as a starter
1946	Dub Jones*	HB	LSU	Chicago Cardinals	2× AAFC champion, 3× NFL champion
1947	Glenn Davis*	HB	Army	Detroit Lions	Heisman Trophy (1946)
1948	Skip Minisi	HB	Penn	New York Giants	College Football Hall of Fame
1949	John Rauch	QB	Georgia	Detroit Lions	College Football Hall of Fame
1950	Adrian Burk*	QB	Baylor	Baltimore Colts	2× Pro Bowl
1951	Bob Williams	QB	Notre Dame	Chicago Bears	College Football Hall of Fame
1952	Les Richter^{‡}	LB	California	New York Yanks (Note: The New York Yanks folded prior to the 1952 NFL season. The Dallas Texans would later assume the rights for Richter.)	Pro Football Hall of Fame
1953	Billy Vessels	HB	Oklahoma	Baltimore Colts	Heisman Trophy (1952)
1954	Lamar McHan	QB	Arkansas	Chicago Cardinals	
1955	Max Boydston	E	Oklahoma	Chicago Cardinals	
1956	Earl Morrall*	QB	Michigan State	San Francisco 49ers	3× Super Bowl champion, NFL Most Valuable Player (1968)
1957	Jon Arnett*	HB	USC	Los Angeles Rams	College Football Hall of Fame; 5× Pro Bowl
1958	John David Crow*	HB	Texas A&M	Chicago Cardinals	Heisman Trophy (1957)
1959	Dick Bass*	FB	Pacific	Los Angeles Rams	3× Pro Bowl
1960	George Izo	QB	Notre Dame	St. Louis Cardinals	
1961	Norm Snead*	QB	Wake Forest	Washington Redskins	4× Pro Bowl
1962	Roman Gabriel	QB	NC State	Los Angeles Rams	College Football Hall of Fame; 4× Pro Bowl, NFL Most Valuable Player (1969)
1963	Jerry Stovall*	DB	LSU	St. Louis Cardinals	3× Pro Bowl
1964	Bob Brown^{‡}	T	Nebraska	Philadelphia Eagles	Pro Football Hall of Fame
1965	Ken Willard*	FB	North Carolina	San Francisco 49ers	4× Pro Bowl
1966	Tom Mack^{‡}	G	Michigan	Los Angeles Rams	Pro Football Hall of Fame
1967	Clint Jones	HB	Michigan State	Minnesota Vikings	College Football Hall of Fame
1968	Bob Johnson	C	Tennessee	Cincinnati Bengals	College Football Hall of Fame
1969	George Kunz*	T	Notre Dame	Atlanta Falcons	8× Pro Bowl
1970	Mike McCoy	DT	Notre Dame	Green Bay Packers	
1971	Archie Manning	QB	Ole Miss	New Orleans Saints	2× Pro Bowl
1972	Sherman White	DE	California	Cincinnati Bengals	
1973	Bert Jones	QB	LSU	Baltimore Colts	Pro Bowl (1976), NFL Most Valuable Player (1976)
1974	Bo Matthews	HB	Colorado	San Diego Chargers	
1975	Randy White^{‡}	DT	Maryland	Dallas Cowboys	Pro Football Hall of Fame
1976	Steve Niehaus	DT	Notre Dame	Seattle Seahawks	NFC Defensive Rookie of the Year (1976)
1977	Tony Dorsett^{‡}	HB	Pittsburgh	Dallas Cowboys	Heisman Trophy (1976)
1978	Art Still*	DE	Kentucky	Kansas City Chiefs	4× Pro Bowl
1979	Mike Bell	DE	Colorado State	Kansas City Chiefs	
1980	Lam Jones	WR	Texas	New York Jets	
1981	Lawrence Taylor^{‡}	LB	North Carolina	New York Giants	Pro Football Hall of Fame, 2× Super Bowl champion (XXI, XXV)
1982	Johnie Cooks	LB	Mississippi State	Baltimore Colts	
1983	Eric Dickerson^{‡}	HB	SMU	Los Angeles Rams	Pro Football Hall of Fame
1984	Dean Steinkuhler	T	Nebraska	Houston Oilers	Outland Trophy (1983)
1985	Bill Fralic	G	Pittsburgh	Atlanta Falcons	4× Pro Bowl
1986	Tony Casillas	DT	Oklahoma	Atlanta Falcons	College Football Hall of Fame
1987	Cornelius Bennett	LB	Alabama	Indianapolis Colts	5× Pro Bowl
1988	Neil Smith	DE	Nebraska	Kansas City Chiefs	NFL 1990s All-Decade Team, 6× Pro Bowl
1989	Tony Mandarich	T	Michigan State	Green Bay Packers	
1990	Blair Thomas	HB	Penn State	New York Jets	
1991	Eric Turner	DB	UCLA	Cleveland Browns	2× Pro Bowl
1992	Quentin Coryatt	LB	Texas A&M	Indianapolis Colts	
1993	Rick Mirer	QB	Notre Dame	Seattle Seahawks	
1994	Marshall Faulk^{‡}	HB	San Diego State	Indianapolis Colts	Pro Football Hall of Fame
1995	Tony Boselli^{‡}	T	USC	Jacksonville Jaguars	Pro Football Hall of Fame
1996	Kevin Hardy	LB	Illinois	Jacksonville Jaguars	Pro Bowl (1999)
1997	Darrell Russell	DT	USC	Oakland Raiders	2× Pro Bowl
1998	Ryan Leaf	QB	Washington State	San Diego Chargers	
1999	Donovan McNabb*	QB	Syracuse	Philadelphia Eagles	6× Pro Bowl
2000	LaVar Arrington*	LB	Penn State	Washington Redskins	Bednarik Award (1999), 3× Pro Bowl
2001	Leonard Davis*	G	Texas	Arizona Cardinals	3× Pro Bowl
2002	Julius Peppers^{‡}	DE	North Carolina	Carolina Panthers	Pro Football Hall of Fame
2003	Charles Rogers	WR	Michigan State	Detroit Lions	Biletnikoff Award (2002)
2004	Robert Gallery	T	Iowa	Oakland Raiders	Outland Trophy (2003)
2005	Ronnie Brown*	HB	Auburn	Miami Dolphins	Pro Bowl (2008)
2006	Reggie Bush	HB	USC	New Orleans Saints	Heisman Trophy (2005)
2007	Calvin Johnson^{‡}	WR	Georgia Tech	Detroit Lions	Pro Football Hall of Fame
2008	Chris Long	DE	Virginia	St. Louis Rams	2× Super Bowl champion, Walter Payton NFL Man of the Year (2018)
2009	Jason Smith	T	Baylor	St. Louis Rams	
2010	Ndamukong Suh*	DT	Nebraska	Detroit Lions	NFL 2010s All-Decade Team; 5× Pro Bowl
2011	Von Miller	LB	Texas A&M	Denver Broncos	2× Super Bowl champion, NFL 2010s All-Decade Team; 8× Pro Bowl
2012	Robert Griffin III	QB	Baylor	Washington Redskins	Heisman Trophy (2011), Offensive Rookie of the Year, Pro Bowl (2012)
2013	Luke Joeckel	T	Texas A&M	Jacksonville Jaguars	Outland Trophy (2012)
2014	Greg Robinson	T	Auburn	St. Louis Rams	
2015	Marcus Mariota	QB	Oregon	Tennessee Titans	Heisman Trophy (2014)
2016	Carson Wentz	QB	North Dakota State	Philadelphia Eagles	Bert Bell Award (2017), Pro Bowl (2017)
2017	Mitchell Trubisky	QB	North Carolina	Chicago Bears	Pro Bowl (2018)
2018	Saquon Barkley	HB	Penn State	New York Giants	Offensive Rookie of the Year, Offensive Player of the Year (2024), 3x Pro Bowl
2019	Nick Bosa	DE	Ohio State	San Francisco 49ers	Defensive Rookie of the Year, Defensive Player of the Year (2022), 5× Pro Bowl
2020	Chase Young	DE	Ohio State	Washington Redskins	Defensive Rookie of the Year, Pro Bowl (2020)
2021	Zach Wilson	QB	BYU	New York Jets	
2022	Aidan Hutchinson	DE	Michigan	Detroit Lions	2 x Pro Bowl
2023	C. J. Stroud	QB	Ohio State	Houston Texans	Offensive Rookie of the Year, Pro Bowl (2023)
2024	Jayden Daniels	QB	LSU	Washington Commanders	Heisman Trophy (2023), Offensive Rookie of the Year, Pro Bowl (2024)
2025	Travis Hunter	CB/WR	Colorado	Jacksonville Jaguars	Heisman Trophy (2024)
2026	David Bailey	DE	Texas Tech	New York Jets	

== Second overall picks by NFL team ==
The Los Angeles Rams and Arizona Cardinals have each held the second overall pick a total of nine times, the most of any NFL team. This includes the Rams' time in Cleveland and St. Louis and the Cardinals' time in Chicago and St. Louis. The Brooklyn Dodgers (NFL) and New York Yanks are the only defunct franchises to have held a second overall pick. The Baltimore Ravens, Buffalo Bills, New England Patriots and Tampa Bay Buccaneers are the only teams that have never had the second overall pick.

Team	Picks	Year(s)	Notes
Los Angeles Rams	9	1942, 1957, 1959, 1962, 1966, 1983, 2008, 2009, 2014	1 as the Cleveland Rams; 3 as the St. Louis Rams; 5 as the Los Angeles Rams
Arizona Cardinals	9	1941, 1944, 1946, 1954, 1955, 1958, 1960, 1963, 2001	6 as the Chicago Cardinals; 2 as the St. Louis Cardinals; 1 as the Arizona Cardinals
Indianapolis Colts	7	1950, 1953, 1973, 1982, 1987, 1992, 1994	4 as the Baltimore Colts; 3 as the Indianapolis Colts
Detroit Lions	6	1947, 1949, 2003, 2007, 2010, 2022	
Philadelphia Eagles	6	1938, 1940, 1943, 1964, 1999, 2016	
Washington Commanders	6	1936, 1961, 2000, 2012, 2020, 2024	4 as the Washington Redskins; 1 as the Washington Commanders; 1 as Boston Redskins
Jacksonville Jaguars	4	1995, 1996, 2013, 2025	
New York Jets	4	1980, 1990, 2021, 2026	
Atlanta Falcons	3	1969, 1985, 1986	
Chicago Bears	3	1939, 1951, 2017	
Kansas City Chiefs	3	1978, 1979, 1988	
New York Giants	3	1948, 1981, 2018	
San Francisco 49ers	3	1956, 1965, 2019	
Cincinnati Bengals	2	1968, 1972	
Dallas Cowboys	2	1975, 1977	
Green Bay Packers	2	1970, 1989	
Las Vegas Raiders	2	1997, 2004	Both as the Oakland Raiders
Los Angeles Chargers	2	1974, 1998	Both as the San Diego Chargers
New Orleans Saints	2	1971, 2006	
Seattle Seahawks	2	1976, 1993	
Tennessee Titans	2	1984, 2015	1 as the Houston Oilers
Brooklyn Dodgers (NFL)	1	1937	
Carolina Panthers	1	2002	
Cleveland Browns	1	1991	
Denver Broncos	1	2011	
Houston Texans	1	2023	
Miami Dolphins	1	2005	
Minnesota Vikings	1	1967	
New York Yanks	1	1952	
Pittsburgh Steelers	1	1945	

== Second overall picks by school ==
Notre Dame has the most second overall picks with 6. Texas A&M has the second-most second overall picks with 5. Baylor, LSU, Michigan State, North Carolina, Nebraska, Ohio State, and USC are tied for third-most second overall picks with 4 each. Only two schools have had second overall picks in consecutive years: Ohio State with Nick Bosa (2019) and Chase Young (2020), and Notre Dame with George Kunz (1969) and Mike McCoy (1970).

School	Total	Year(s)
Notre Dame	6	1951, 1960, 1969, 1970, 1976, 1993
Texas A&M	5	1941, 1958, 1992, 2011, 2013
Baylor	4	1942, 1950, 2009, 2012
LSU	4	1946, 1963, 1973, 2024
Michigan State	4	1956, 1967, 1989, 2003
North Carolina	4	1965, 1981, 2002, 2017
Nebraska	4	1964, 1984, 1988, 2010
Ohio State	4	1938, 2019, 2020, 2023
USC	4	1957, 1995, 2006, 2008
Oklahoma	3	1953, 1955, 1986
Penn State	3	1990, 2000, 2018
Alabama	2	1936, 1987
Auburn	2	2005, 2014
California	2	1952, 1972
Colorado	2	1974, 2025
Michigan	2	1966, 2022
Pittsburgh	2	1977, 1985
Texas	2	1980, 2001
Washington State	2	1937, 1998
Arkansas	1	1954
Army	1	1947
BYU	1	2021
Colorado State	1	1979
Columbia	1	1939
Duke	1	1940
Florida	1	1945
Georgia	1	1949
Illinois	1	1996
Iowa	1	2003
Kentucky	1	1978
Maryland	1	1975
Mississippi State	1	1982
North Carolina State	1	1962
North Dakota State	1	2016
Ole Miss	1	1971
Oregon	1	2015
Pacific	1	1959
Penn	1	1948
San Diego State	1	1994
SMU	1	1983
Syracuse	1	1999
Tennessee	1	1968
Texas Tech	1	2026
UCLA	1	1957
Virginia	1	2008
VMI	1	1943
Wake Forest	1	1961
Wisconsin	1	1944

== Second overall picks by position ==
Second overall selections by position
Position	Number of selections	Last year selected
Quarterbacks	24	2024
Running backs	19	2018
Defensive linemen	16	2026
Offensive linemen	13	2014
Wide receivers	3	2007
Linebackers	8	2011
Defensive backs	3	2025

== See also ==
- List of first overall NFL draft picks
