= Drew Basil =

American gridiron football player (born 1991)

No. 23
- Position: Kicker

Personal information
- Born: November 17, 1991 (age 34); Chillicothe, Ohio, U.S.
- Listed height: 6 ft 1 in (1.85 m)
- Listed weight: 215 lb (98 kg)

Career information
- High school: Chillicothe (OH)
- College: Ohio State
- NFL draft: 2014: undrafted

Career history
- Atlanta Falcons (2014)*; Montreal Alouettes (2015)*; Cleveland Gladiators (2017)
- * Offseason or practice squad member only

Career AFL statistics
- FG made: 0
- FG att: 0
- PAT made: 29
- PAT att: 31
- Tackles: 1
- Stats at ArenaFan.com

Drew Basil (born November 17, 1991) is an American former gridiron football placekicker. He was a member of the Atlanta Falcons, Montreal Alouettes and Cleveland Gladiators.

== College career ==
Basil committed to Ohio State University and played four years for the Ohio State Buckeyes football team. He graduated in 2013 ranked eighth all-time in field goals made at Ohio State, with 33; and third all time in field goal percentage, with 78.6%.

== Professional career ==
Basil went undrafted in the 2014 NFL draft, later signing with the Atlanta Falcons as an undrafted free agent. He later spent time with the Montreal Alouettes of the Canadian Football League in 2015, but failed to make the final roster. On March 30, 2017, Basil signed with the Cleveland Gladiators of the Arena Football League for the 2017 Arena Football League season.

== After sports ==
He now coaches high school football and golf at the Upper Arlington High School and has coached over 20 division 1 athletes. Most notably he has produced athletes such as Zac Yoakam (Kicker at Notre Dame), Cameron Shirkey (Kicker at Notre Dame College) and Tyler Perkins (Punter at Iowa State).
