= Lancaster High School (Ohio) =

Lancaster Senior High School

Location
- 1312 Granville Pike; Lancaster, (Fairfield County), Ohio 43130; United States; 39°43′58″N 82°35′10″W

Information
- Type: Public, Coeducational high school
- Established: 1849
- School district: Lancaster City Schools
- Superintendent: Nathan Hale
- Director: Caroline Davis, Career & Technical Education
- Principal: Scott Burre
- Teaching staff: 90.80 (FTE)
- Grades: 9–12
- Enrollment: 1,918 (2023–2024)
- Student to teacher ratio: 21.12
- Campus: J.E. Brown Campus (Main) Stanbery Campus (Downtown)
- Colors: Blue and gold
- Song: Oh, Lancaster, our Lancaster, Our High School so dear. We praise thee, alma mater, Thy name we love to hear. Oh Lancaster, our Lancaster, Long may she rule in fame. Here's a toast to ole Lancaster, Love live her name!
- Fight song: "Stand Up and Cheer"
- Athletics: 22 Varsity sports
- Athletics conference: Ohio Capital Conference
- Mascot: Gale, personified as Gusto The Gale
- Team name: Golden Gales
- Rival: Newark High School (Ohio), Pickerington High School Central
- Accreditation: North Central Association of Colleges and Schools
- Newspaper: Eye of the Gale
- Yearbook: The Mirage
- Alumni: Lancaster High School Alumni Association
- Website: lhs.lancaster.k12.oh.us

Lancaster High School is a secondary-level public high school located in Lancaster, Ohio, and is the only high school within the Lancaster City Schools district.

The previous building was opened during the fall of 1964. In the summer of 2026, they demolished the building to make way for a parking lot and two softball fields for the new high school being built. The current high school was opened in August 2026, and it was a part of a big project that included making 5 new elementary schools, 2 new junior high schools, and the new high school. Currently, the building houses grades 9–12.

Lancaster High School offers college prep, honors, AP, average, and lower-level classes and houses its own career and technical education (vocational) center, as well as the Stanbery Career Center campus located in Downtown Lancaster.

== History ==
The first high school in Lancaster, Ohio was founded in 1849 and was housed in a building at the corner of Broad and Allen streets, in what was known then as the North Building. In 1856, the high school was moved to a South School due to overcrowding at the North Building. Enrollment continued to increase and in 1872 the school board had to provide additional classrooms at another building until 1873, when a new three-story North School building was opened. This building eventually became overcrowded, and in 1906 the high school was moved to a new building at the corner of Mulberry Street and Pearl Avenue (the current location of the Stanbery Campus). According to board of education minutes from 1908, the new building already was overcrowded, and in 1914 a bond issue was passed to allow an extension to be added to the existing building. This annex was completed in 1917. Overcrowding continued, and in 1930 another addition to the building was completed. In 1950, the final addition to the high school was completed to the east side of the building, which today houses administrative offices.

In 1963, a state fire marshal ordered that the 1906 and 1917 sections of the building be abandoned because they were a fire hazard. Those sections were demolished in 1965.

In October 1960, the school board selected a location for a new site for the high school. Construction began in 1961, and was completed in 1963.

== Building ==
The current building is located on a 75-acre (300,000 m^{2}) site, located on Granville Pike (State Route 37). The building consists of two wings: the left-wing (front)-1st floor houses administrative offices, the library, teachers' lounge, and general classrooms; 2nd floor houses classrooms and labs for biology, chemistry, and physics; the right-wing (only one story) houses art, music, and shop classes. Between the two wings is an area referred to the "GAC," housing the Gymnasium, Auditorium, and Cafeteria.

In 1963, Fulton Field was opened to accommodate football games.

In 1965, using funds from interest earned from previous bond issues and funds from the National Education Act of 1963, the high school opened a vocational building on-site to house cosmetology, drafting, electronics, auto mechanics, and Occupational Work Experience programs. In addition, a planetarium was constructed using donated monies from Mrs. Phillip Rising Peters in memory of her husband and son. In addition to the building, Mrs. Peters also donated the instruments and equipment used in the planetarium. Peters Planetarium is one of the few located on the grounds of a high school.

In 2003, as part of Ohio's bicentennial, the high school was made a historical landmark in commemoration of Robert G. Heft's designing of the current 50-star flag.

In 2026, a new building will open at the site of the old high school for the 2026-27 school year. The vocational building opened in 1965 and the old high school located on the site are set to be demolished to construct a new parking lot for the new building. With this new building, career-tech programs that were previously at the Stanbery campus and the vocational building next to the old high school will now be taught in the new building.

The students of Lancaster High School have a bike path that connects to the Ohio University Lancaster Campus.

== Clubs and activities ==
Lancaster's Latin Club functions as a local chapter of both the Ohio Junior Classical League (OJCL) and National Junior Classical League (NJCL).

LHS had bolstered its journalism program in recent years, (though it does not stand as such today) reinstating its student newspaper, "The Eye of the Gale." The program has an average of 25-30 student staff members, and publishes the newspaper quarterly. In 2012 the organization began a student-run news site in an effort to involve students in the fluid media landscape.

Lancaster, Ohio has always been known for successful theatre. Through community support, LHS puts on two major productions a year. In the fall, the school does a play, and during the spring, the school does a musical. LHS also has a chartered troupe of the International Thespian Society. Troupe 1848 is governed by the Educational Theatre Association and promotes theatre arts within LHS.

Lancaster's marching band, the Band of Gold, has been highly successful over its history. The Band of Gold has qualified in the Ohio Music Education Association State Marching Band Finals each year since 1981.

== Athletics ==
=== Golden Gales (Mascot) ===
Lancaster High School has been known as the Golden Gales since the mid-1930s. Until that point, the teams went by the Golden Tornadoes, According to Dave Davis, a former LHS basketball coach, the name change came as a result of the receiving a new printing press. Due to the limitations of the column width, the full name wouldn't fit properly. One of the sports writers came up with Golden Gales and the name stuck. The unique name is not shared with anyone else in the state of Ohio. The mascot on the sidelines for various sporting events obtained the name “Gusto” after former Lancaster High School and Tarhe Trails Elementary school student Dominic Clarke won a contest at Tarhe Trails to name the mascot. He named the mascot “Gusto” based on the Skylanders video game character by the same name. The school and fans commonly shorten the name of the team by dropping the adjective and refer to the team as simply the "Gales" This is evident by the athletic website LancasterGales.com.

=== State championships ===
- Boys cross country - 1990, 1979
- Boys track and field - 1980
- Girls cross country - 2024

== Notable alumni ==
- Faye Abbott, football player and head coach for the Dayton Triangles in the very early days of the NFL
- Allan Anderson, former MLB pitcher, Minnesota Twins and American League ERA leader in 1988
- Lester Burcham, former CEO of the F. W. Woolworth Company
- Bobby Carpenter, former NFL linebacker
- Rob Carpenter, former NFL running back
- Gene Cole, silver medalist in track at the 1952 Summer Olympics
- Jim Cordle, former NFL player
- Bill Glassford, former head football coach for the Nebraska Cornhuskers
- David Graf, actor most notable for playing Officer Tackleberry in the Police Academy films
- Alex W. "Pete" Hart, former president and CEO of MasterCard
- Robert G. Heft, designer of America's fifty-star flag
- Rex Kern, former Ohio State football quarterback. MVP of 1969 Rose Bowl and NFL player for Baltimore Colts and Buffalo Bills
- James A. Lantz, former Speaker of the Ohio House of Representatives
- Billy Milligan, criminal and focus of Monsters Inside: The 24 Faces of Billy Milligan
- Clarence E. Miller, former U.S. Representative
- Marc Wolfgang Miller, cryptozoologist, explorer
- Joe Ogilvie, PGA Tour golfer
- Richard F. Outcault, pioneer of the modern comic strip and creator of The Yellow Kid
- Mike Parobeck, comic book artist
- Jim Waugh, former MLB player (Pittsburgh Pirates)

== Notable former faculty ==
- Ed Folsom (English teacher, 1969–1970, and chair of English, 1971–1972), renowned Walt Whitman scholar and Guggenheim Fellow
