= Tom Holland =

British actor (born 1996)

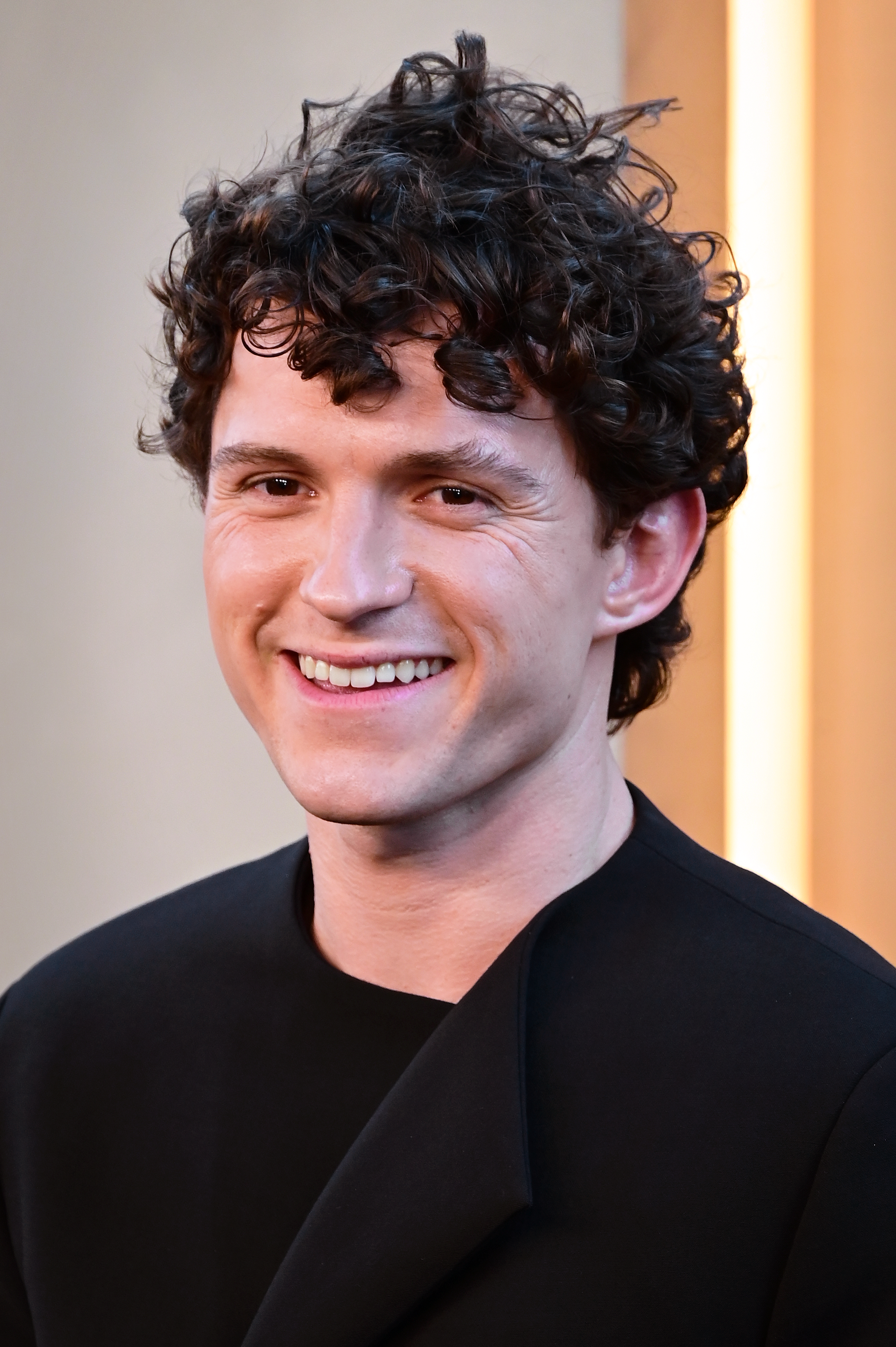
- Holland in 2026
- Born: Thomas Stanley Holland; 1 June 1996 (age 30); London, England
- Occupation: Actor
- Years active: 2008–present
- Works: See roles and awards list
- Spouse: Zendaya (m. 2026)
- Father: Dominic Holland

Thomas Stanley Holland (born 1 June 1996) is a British actor. Known for his performances in both independent films and major studio features, his films have grossed over $16.1 billion worldwide, making him the highest-grossing leading actor of all time. His accolades include a British Academy Film Award and three Saturn Awards, in addition to nominations for four Critics' Choice Awards.

Holland's career began at age nine when he enrolled in a dancing class, where a choreographer noticed him and arranged for him to audition for a role in Billy Elliot the Musical at London's Victoria Palace Theatre. After two years of training, he was promoted to the lead role of Billy Elliot, which he played from 2008 to 2010. Holland made his film debut as a voice actor on the British dub of the Japanese animated film Arrietty (2011). In 2012, he received acclaim for his portrayal of a young tourist in the disaster drama The Impossible, which earned him the National Board of Review Award for Breakthrough Performance and a nomination for the Critics' Choice Movie Award for Best Young Performer. After this, Holland decided to pursue acting as a full-time career, appearing in How I Live Now (2013), In the Heart of the Sea (2015) and The Lost City of Z (2016).

Holland achieved international recognition playing Spider-Man in seven Marvel Cinematic Universe (MCU) superhero films, beginning with Captain America: Civil War (2016). The following year, Holland received the BAFTA Rising Star Award and became the youngest actor to play a title role in an MCU film when he starred in Spider-Man: Homecoming (2017). He reprised the role in the film's sequels Far From Home (2019), No Way Home (2021) and Brand New Day (2026). Holland played against-type roles in the crime dramas The Devil All the Time (2020) and Cherry (2021), and starred in the big-budget films Uncharted (2022) and The Odyssey (2026).

Holland had voice roles in the animated features Spies in Disguise (2019) and Onward (2020). On television, he had roles in the BBC historical miniseries Wolf Hall (2015) and the Apple TV+ psychological thriller limited series The Crowded Room (2023). He returned to the stage as Romeo in the West End revival of Romeo and Juliet (2024). Holland is married to Zendaya, his co-star in the Spider-Man films.

== Early life ==
Thomas Stanley Holland was born on 1 June 1996 in Kingston upon Thames, in south-west London, to photographer Nicola (née Frost) and comedian-author Dominic Holland. He has three younger brothers. His paternal grandmother was from County Tipperary, Ireland and his paternal grandfather was from the Isle of Man. (Note: Attributed to multiple references:) Holland lives in Kingston upon Thames, near the house of his parents and brothers. As his parents have creative professions, he is often inspired by them and considers his father a role model. His father has unofficially worked as Holland's manager due to his experience in the entertainment industry.

When Holland was seven, he was diagnosed with dyslexia. His parents sent him and his brothers to an all-male Catholic private school—Donhead Preparatory School in Wimbledon, in the Merton borough of south-west London—so Holland could receive special attention. (Note: Attributed to multiple references:) Holland then attended Wimbledon College, a voluntary aided Jesuit secondary school, followed by the BRIT School for Performing Arts and Technology in the Selhurst area of Croydon.

Growing up, Holland considered several career choices. As a child, he was a fan of Janet Jackson songs and often danced to them; his mother signed him up for a dance class advertised at Donhead. In his teens, Holland briefly attended carpentry school in Cardiff, Wales. He also considered becoming a primary school teacher.

== Career ==
=== 2006–2014: Early stage work and film debut ===
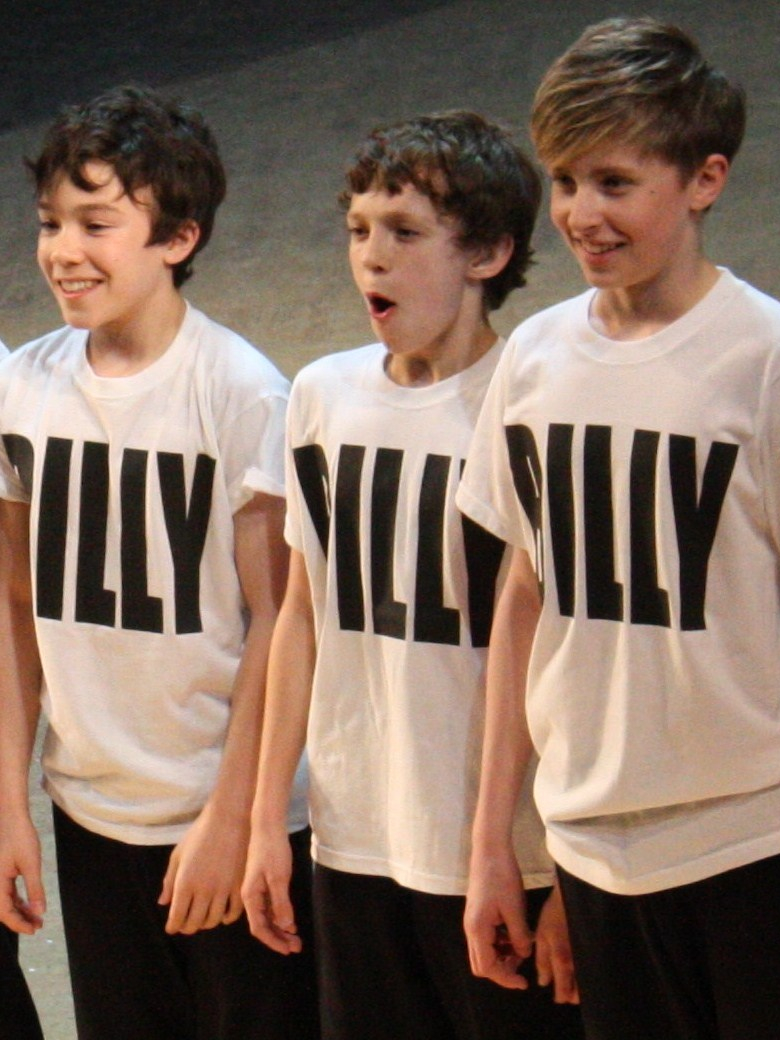
Holland (centre) performing at the fifth anniversary of Billy Elliot the Musical at the Victoria Palace Theatre in 2010

At age nine, Holland began dancing in a hip hop class at Nifty Feet Dance School in Wimbledon, where he performed with his school group at the 2006 Richmond Dance Festival. There, he was spotted by choreographer Lynne Page, an associate of Peter Darling, choreographer of Billy Elliot the Musical. Page arranged an audition for Holland; the musical's director Stephen Daldry thought Holland had great potential and was a natural actor. After two years of training in ballet, tap dancing and acrobatics, Holland won the role of Michael Caffrey, Billy Elliot's best friend, and made his debut performance at the West End's Victoria Palace Theatre in June 2008. During his time performing in the musical, Holland learned gymnastics. Holland said that when his peers at school found out about his dancing activities, they started bullying him.

Later in 2008, Holland and co-star Tanner Pflueger were promoted to the lead role of Billy Elliot in the musical. On his first day playing Elliot, Holland developed tonsillitis but performed anyway to positive reviews. Following his stage success, Holland hoped to be popular in school and that his schoolmates would stop bullying him. After being in a professional environment, he matured earlier than his peers and struggled to fit in. As a result, his GCSE grades suffered. After his work on Billy Elliot finished in 2010, Holland voiced a role in the British dub of the Japanese animated fantasy film Arrietty (2011), and sent an audition tape to Juan Antonio Bayona for a part in The Impossible (2012). Bayona arranged a meeting, and had Holland write a letter to his mother and recite it as an audition. Impressed with his emotional delivery, Bayona cast Holland in the film.

In The Impossible, Holland plays a teenager trapped with his family during the 2004 Indian Ocean earthquake and tsunami. Transitioning from stage to screen was initially difficult for Holland. He and his co-star Naomi Watts filmed physically and psychologically taxing scenes in a 35,000-gallon water tank. Working with Watts made Holland realise that he wanted to pursue an acting career permanently. The Impossible premiered at the Toronto International Film Festival in September 2012 to critical and commercial success, earning $180.3 million against a budget of $45 million. Holland received critical acclaim for his performance and won several awards, including the National Board of Review Award for Breakthrough Performance and the London Film Critics Circle Award for Young British Performer of the Year. Following The Impossible, Holland appeared in the drama film How I Live Now (2013), lent his voice in a supporting role for the drama film Locke (2013), and had a cameo in Billy Elliot the Musical Live (2014).

=== 2015–2017: Breakthrough as Spider-Man ===
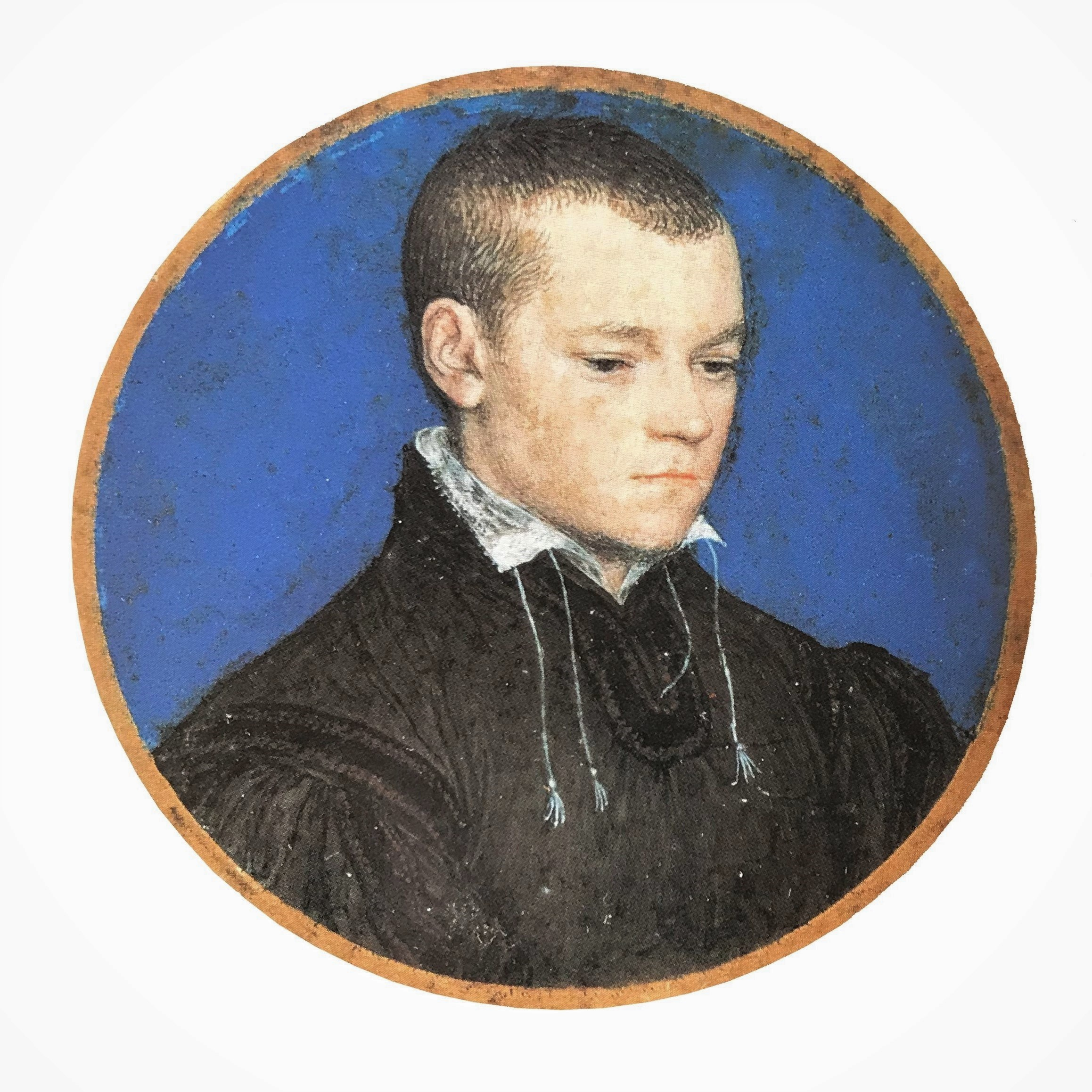
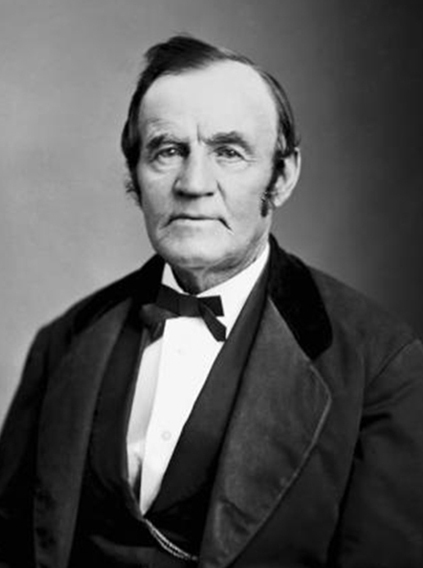
Holland portrayed two historical figures in 2015: Gregory Cromwell (top) in the miniseries Wolf Hall and Thomas Nickerson (bottom) in his teenage years in the film In the Heart of the Sea.

Holland appeared in four episodes of BBC Two's historical mini series Wolf Hall (2015), as Gregory Cromwell, son of the protagonist Thomas Cromwell played by Mark Rylance. He directed Tweet (2015), a three-minute short film about a young man building a birdhouse with his grandfather; Holland later expressed an interest in directing feature films in his 40s. Also in 2015, Holland co-starred as the teenage sailor Thomas Nickerson in Ron Howard's historical adventure-drama In the Heart of the Sea. The film is based on the namesake 2000 non-fiction book about the sinking of the American whaling ship Essex in 1820. In preparation, he and co-stars, including Chris Hemsworth, lost significant weight, consuming 500–1,000 calories a day. Holland performed most of his stunts in the film. In the Heart of the Sea received mixed reviews from critics, and grossed $93 million against a $100 million budget. Brian Truitt of the USA Today wrote that Holland "does a good job".

In June 2015, Holland signed a six-picture deal with Marvel Studios to play a teenage Peter Parker / Spider-Man. Growing up, Holland was a fan of Spider-Man; he owned 30 costumes and bed sheet covers of the character. He auditioned against 1,500 teenagers worldwide, including English actors Charlie Rowe and Asa Butterfield. While producers Kevin Feige and Amy Pascal were impressed with his performances in The Impossible, Wolf Hall, and In the Heart of the Sea, directors the Russo brothers cited Holland's dancing and gymnastics background as the reasons to cast him. Stan Lee, Spider-Man's creator, said Holland was the "exact age and height" when he envisioned the character. As part of the Marvel Cinematic Universe (MCU), he first appeared as Spider-Man in Captain America: Civil War (2016). The film was a critical and commercial success, grossing over $1.1 billion worldwide against a budget of $250 million to become the highest-grossing film of 2016. In a review for The Guardian, Peter Bradshaw praised Holland and co-star Paul Rudd (who played Ant-Man) as "seductively high-spirited and hilarious", and Richard Roeper of Chicago Sun-Times wrote that he made "a strong first impression" as Spider-Man.

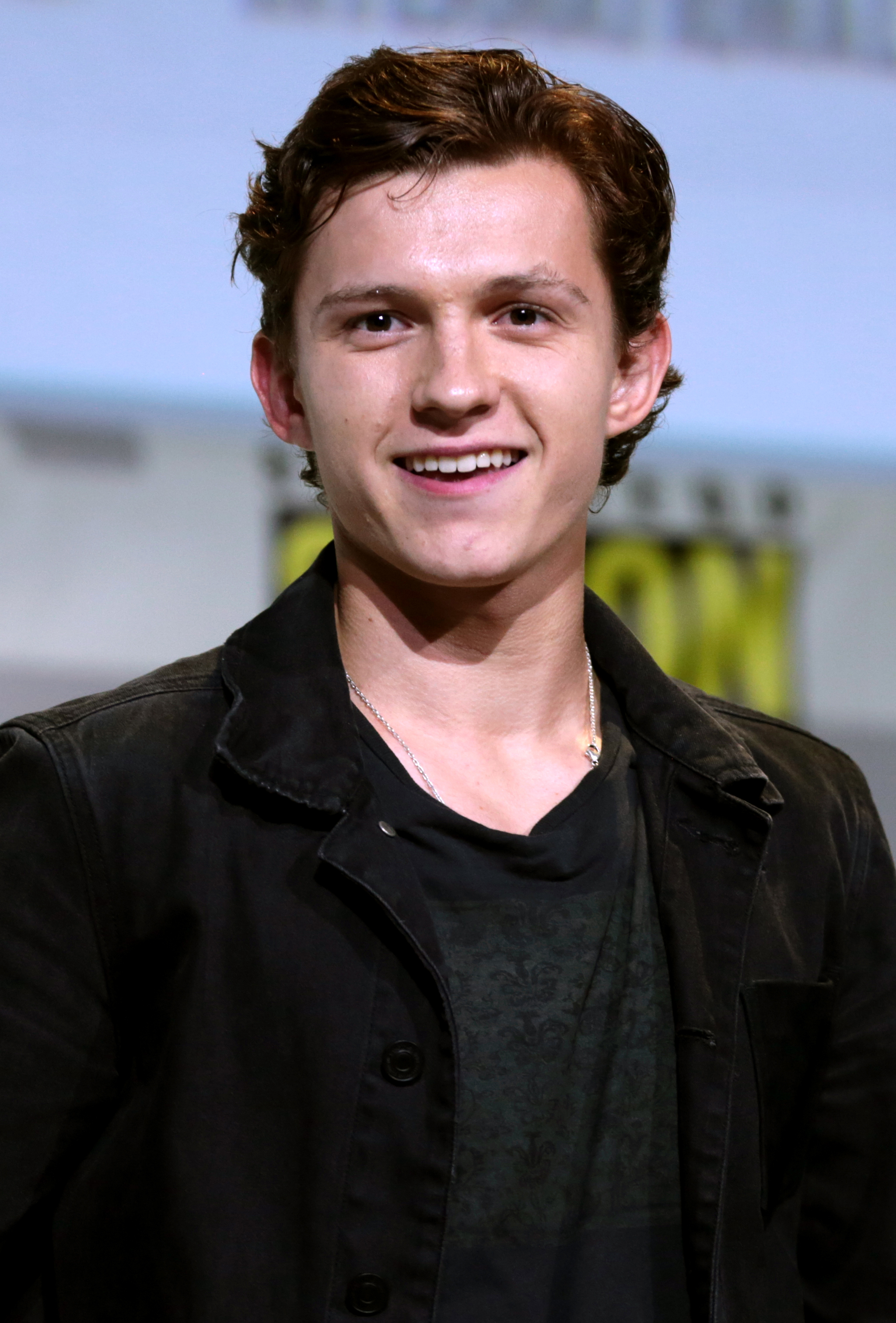
Holland at the 2016 San Diego Comic-Con, to promote Spider-Man: Homecoming

In 2016, Holland co-starred with Joel Kinnaman and Percy Hynes White in the psychological thriller Edge of Winter. It was the first film he did without his parents' knowledge. Frank Scheck of The Hollywood Reporter found Holland and White "excellent", describing their terrified reaction as "more emotionally wrenching than the tired thriller genre conventions to which the film ultimately succumbs". At the 70th British Academy Film Awards in 2017, Holland won the Rising Star Award. Holland's first work that year was alongside Charlie Hunnam in James Gray's drama The Lost City of Z, which was released to positive reviews. On his last day of filming, he broke his nose after a failed backflip attempt. Holland played the son of Percy Fawcett (Hunnam), an explorer who makes several attempts to find a supposed lost ancient city in the Amazon rainforest. Neil Soans of The Times of India praised Holland for making the film emotional towards the end and Rex Reed of The New York Observer found him "remarkably strong and self-assured". Later in 2017, Holland played Samuel Insull in Alfonso Gomez-Rejon's The Current War, which received negative reviews and was a box-office failure. Clarisse Loughrey of The Independent found Holland's role insubstantial.

Holland's second film in 2017 was his solo feature as the title character in Spider-Man: Homecoming. As a result, Holland earned an entry in Guinness Book of World Records as the youngest actor to play a title role in the MCU. Though Holland took some inspiration from previous Spider-Man actors Tobey Maguire and Andrew Garfield, he wanted to add some newness in his reinterpretation of the character. Homecoming focused on Parker, as he tries to balance being a high-school student and a superhero. To prepare, Holland attended The Bronx High School of Science in the Bronx for a few days, although other students did not believe he was cast as Spider-Man. Holland felt this situation reflected the film's story, in which other characters are unaware that Parker is Spider-Man. Homecoming and Holland's performance received positive reviews. Peter Travers called it "a star performance given by a born actor". Made on a budget of $175 million, the film grossed over $800 million worldwide. Holland's final role in 2017 was in the Irish film Pilgrimage, which premiered at the Tribeca Film Festival. Outside film that year, Holland appeared with Zendaya on Paramount Network's Lip Sync Battle, where he performed a lip-sync to Gene Kelly's rendition of "Singin' in the Rain" from Singin' in the Rain (1952), before transitioning to Rihanna's "Umbrella" in drag. His parents founded The Brothers Trust, a charitable organisation, which aims to use his popularity to raise funds for humanitarian causes.

=== 2018–2021: Commercial success ===
Holland reprised his role as Spider-Man in Avengers: Infinity War (2018) and its follow-up Avengers: Endgame (2019), which were filmed back-to-back. The pictures each earned more than $2 billion and Endgame became the highest-grossing film of all time, a status it held for two years. (Note: Avengers: Endgame remained the highest-grossing film for two years until it was surpassed by Avatar (2009) following a 2021 re-release in China.) Holland followed with the sequel Spider-Man: Far From Home (2019), which received positive reviews and became the first Spider-Man film to earn $1 billion, finishing as the fourth-highest grosser of 2019. Ben Travis of Empire magazine found Holland "a note-perfect Spider-Man — still funnier and more believably teenage" than Maguire and Garfield who previously portrayed the character. Travis wrote, "Holland never loses the ebullient spark that makes him one of the MCU's most endearing figures." Holland received a third consecutive Saturn Award for Best Performance by a Younger Actor for Far From Home, having previously won for Civil War and Homecoming. He voiced roles in the Blue Sky Studios animation Spies in Disguise (2019), the live-action film Dolittle (2020), and the Pixar animated film Onward (2020). The last two were with his MCU co-stars Robert Downey Jr. and Chris Pratt, respectively. Made on lucrative budgets, all three films underperformed at the box-office.

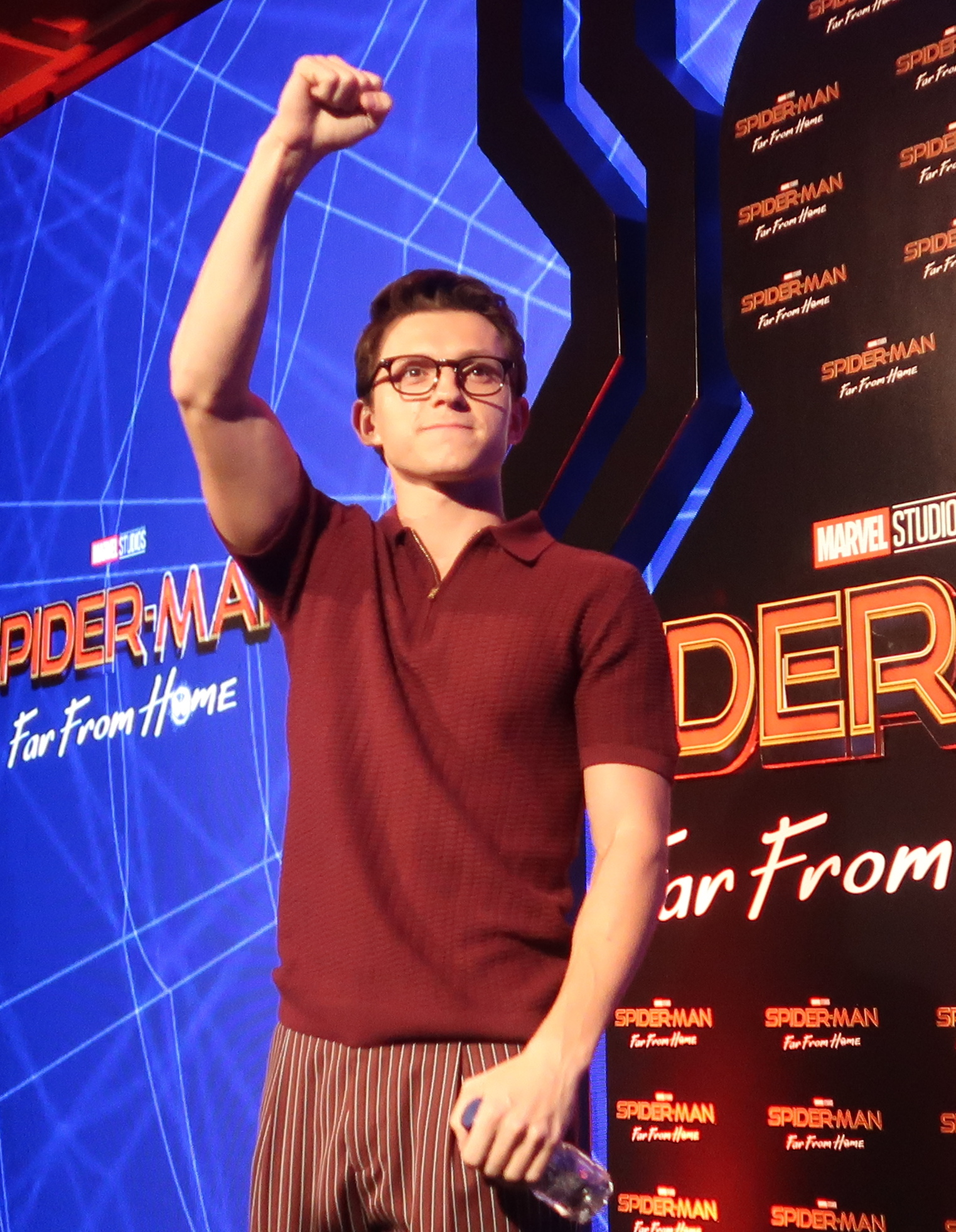
Holland at an event for Spider-Man: Far From Home in 2019

Alongside Avengers co-star Sebastian Stan, Holland starred in Antonio Campos's The Devil All the Time (2020), a Netflix psychological thriller set after World War II. Holland said he initially worried that he lacked the depth to play a young orphaned man who goes on a killing spree, and was scared and nervous on his first day on set. Encouraged by Campos, he ultimately enjoyed playing the part, although it took a temporary toll on his mental health. Campos praised Holland's effort to learn Southern American English for the role, described his acting process as "methodical", "thoughtful and sensitive", and called him a kind person. Critics from IndieWire and Roger Ebert's website opined that despite the film's failed script, Holland gave a convincing performance and showed his range as an actor. By November 2020, the film was the 22nd-most watched straight-to-streaming title of the year, according to a Variety report.

Holland starred in three films that were released in 2021. His first, the crime drama Cherry, is based on the 2018 novel by American author Nico Walker, and reunited him with Avengers directors Russo brothers. He played a college student with post-traumatic stress disorder (PTSD) after enlisting in the army, and robs banks to finance his drug addiction. In preparation for the role, Holland shaved his head and interviewed military veterans undergoing treatments for substance abuse and PTSD. He also lost 30 pounds (14 kg) of weight, then regained it after filming. The film was released in cinemas in February and digitally on Apple TV+ in March. Consensus among critics was that the film enabled Holland to broaden his horizons as an actor, but it had a formulaic story. This was echoed by Owen Gleiberman of Variety who further noted that Holland proved his skills as an actor and demonstrated a range of indulgent looks and moods. Holland next played alongside Daisy Ridley as a young man living on a planet called New World in Chaos Walking, an adaptation of Patrick Ness's best-selling science fiction series of the same name. The film was delayed due to several reshoots in early 2019, which added $15 million to its budget, bringing its cost to $100 million. Chaos Walking failed to recoup its budget and received poor reviews. David Rooney of The Hollywood Reporter found the chemistry between Holland and Ridley lackluster, and Christian Holub of Entertainment Weekly noted his failed attempt to break away from roles similar to Spider-Man.

In November 2021, Holland voiced Percy Pig in a series of advertisements for Marks & Spencer's Christmas food specials. The following month, Holland reprised his role as Peter Parker in the sequel Spider-Man: No Way Home. After taking on mature roles in films like Cherry, Holland noted that he found it strange adjusting back to playing Parker, chiefly due to raising his voice pitch and returning to the mindset of a "naïve, charming teenager". He described No Way Home as the "most ambitious standalone superhero movie ever made". Despite its release during the COVID-19 pandemic, No Way Home quickly emerged as the highest-grossing film of 2021 and the sixth highest-grossing film of all time. It also became the first film since 2019's Star Wars: The Rise of Skywalker to earn more than $1 billion at the box-office. No Way Home became the highest-rated Spider-Man film on the online database IMDb and the review aggregator Rotten Tomatoes. Wendy Ide of The Guardian wrote that the film "delivers an overflowing, funnel-web cornucopia of treats for Spider-fans" and attributed Parker's continuing appeal to "his endearing, puppyish enthusiasm". The Times' Kevin Maher opined that Holland "own[s] every inch of the role" and "casts his web and captures your heart".

=== 2022–present: Career expansion ===
Holland in 2023

Holland began 2022 with an investment in Dogpound gyms, and a starring role as a young Nathan Drake, a charismatic fortune hunter, in the film adaptation of Naughty Dog's Uncharted video game series. In preparation for scenes where his character is bartending, Holland worked shifts at the Chiltern Firehouse, a pub in London. Though the filming was delayed due to the COVID-19 pandemic, Holland continued to eat and train for the role. While Uncharted polarised critics, Rebecca Rubin of Variety wrote that Holland's star-power likely contributed to its box-office success. In a mixed review for his performance, Brian Tallerico of Roger Ebert's website labelled him miscast, writing that "Holland has the agility but quite simply lacks the weight and world-weariness needed" for the role.

Holland next executive produced and starred in the Apple TV+ miniseries The Crowded Room (2023), inspired by the 1981 non-fiction novel The Minds of Billy Milligan, in which he played a character based on Billy Milligan. It was met with negative reviews; San Francisco Chronicle's Bob Strauss dismissed it as "another one of Tom Holland's 'serious' projects that's hard to take seriously". Nevertheless, he earned a nomination for the Critics' Choice Television Award for Best Actor in a Movie/Miniseries. Holland said that the role proved to be too emotionally taxing for him, and that he would take a year off work to recover. He made a return to the stage as Romeo in Jamie Lloyd's West End revival of Romeo and Juliet, which ran for twelve weeks from May 2024. Critics had mixed opinions on the play and Holland's performance.

In 2024, Holland created his own production company, named Billy17, and landed a deal with Sony Pictures. In 2026, he starred in Christopher Nolan's film The Odyssey, an adaptation of the epic poem the Odyssey, written by Homer; he played Telemachus, the son of Odysseus (Matt Damon) and Penelope (Anne Hathaway). Holland called the film the best experience of his career and expressed gratitude to Nolan for the opportunity. Holland took great pride and purpose in his work and considered it an ideal role. Reviews for the film were positive, and Kevin Maher, chief film critic of "The Times" described "The Odyssey" as a "film that hinges in so many ways on the expressive power of Holland...". The Odyssey and Holland's next release—his fourth Spider-Man film, subtitled Brand New Day—were among the highest-grossing films of 2026. The latter focuses on Peter Parker as he anonymously protects New York City as Spider-Man while investigating a powerful new threat and coping with a surprising, potentially dangerous evolution of his powers. Holland contributed to story ideas early in development, including a puberty-like evolution of Peter's powers that was adopted and further developed by the creative team. While filming in September 2025, Holland was briefly hospitalised after concussion, leading to a temporary pause in production. The film and Holland's performance received positive reviews. Stephanie Zacharek of Time called Holland "a smart, sensitive actor" who "takes his character's emotional travails just seriously enough".

== In the media ==
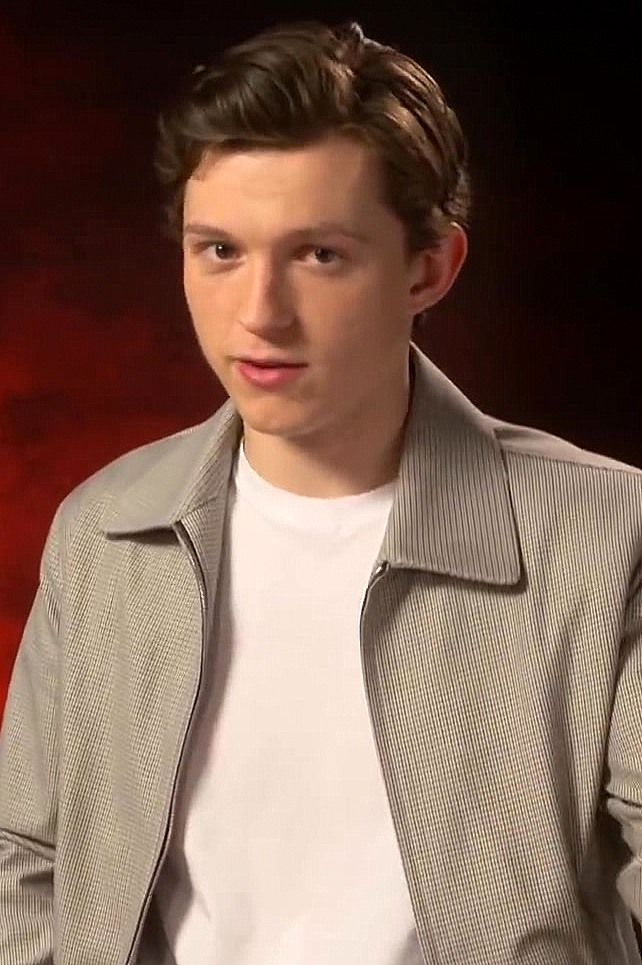
Holland in an interview with MTV in 2018

Nadia Khomami of The Guardian said that Holland's "cheeky British charm, vulnerability and wit" has made him the object of infatuation on the internet. Jonathan Dean of The Sunday Times considered him to be "poised and professional, but also so confident and personable" and took note of his maturity "despite boyish wiriness". German actor Sönke Möhring, his co-star from The Impossible, similarly remarked on his professionalism, adding, "he is blessed with a deep soul [...] down to earth, very polite and a friendly kid." Kevin Macdonald, who directed Holland in How I Live Now, praised him as confident, "articulate and enthusiastic", and attributed Holland's success to his positive energy. When asked about the secret to his success, Holland said he believes in avoiding trouble and working hard.

Holland appeared on Screen International's "UK Stars of Tomorrow – 2012", and The Hollywood Reporter's "Next Gen 2015", a list of promising newcomers in film. In 2019, he featured on Forbes' "30 Under 30 Europe", a list of influential people under 30 years, and Insider Inc.'s "45 young stars who will one day rule Hollywood". After appearing on Glamour's "Hot, Young & British Actors 2020", he was named among the best actors under 30 by Tuko, and Complex Networks in 2021. In the former listing, Ryan Mutuku described him as "a darling to the English media" because of his openness and willingness to also give interviews not related to film promotions. Calling him "his generation's biggest leading man" in 2021, GQ's Oliver Franklin-Wallis wrote, "Holland has ascended to a tier of stardom few actors ever reach, and rarely so young". Variety editors Brent Lang and Rebecca Rubin reported in December 2021 that after the success of the Spider-Man films, Holland could become a top-paid actor in the future. They noted the current lack of young leading men in Hollywood and saw Holland's potential to herald a new generation of successful actors.

Holland considers himself to be "an impossible people pleaser", which according to Olivia Singh of Business Insider has resulted in his facing burnout and an incident where he vomited after a press conference. A self-admittedly indiscreet person, Holland has gained a reputation for inadvertently spoiling important plot elements of his films during interviews and press conferences. His MCU co-stars labelled him the "least trustworthy" cast member in terms of spoilers. To prevent an incident, he only read parts of Captain America: Civil War's script. Joe Russo similarly avoided giving Holland the script to Avengers: Endgame, and Holland knew only his lines.

Holland has expressed his views on the film industry. In a 2019 interview with The Sunday Times, he spoke for more representation of racial minorities and the LGBT community in film. That year, when filmmaker Martin Scorsese criticised Marvel films for their lack of portraying human emotions, Holland highlighted that Scorsese has never made one, so he may not fully understand the experience. Holland stated that the key difference between a Marvel film and an award-winning one is budget, not the artistic process. He emphasised that Marvel films are still "real art" and noted that comparing Marvel blockbusters to independent films is unfair, as they reach vastly different audiences.

== Personal life ==
Holland describes himself as a private person and is reluctant to discuss his personal life. He has ADHD and dyslexia, and has discussed having frequent episodes of sleepwalking and sleep paralysis. He has declined multiple invitations to host Saturday Night Live because the dyslexia makes it difficult for him to read aloud. After feeling dependent on alcohol in social situations, he participated in Dry January in 2022, and became a teetotaller afterwards. In 2024, he launched BERO, a low-alcohol beer brand. (Note: Attributed to multiple references:)

In November 2021, Holland and his Spider-Man co-star Zendaya confirmed that they were in a relationship. (Note: Attributed to multiple references:) Zendaya said the media attention it received felt "weird and confusing and invasive". The couple moved into a £3 million home in London in 2023, and became engaged in December 2024. During the 32nd Actor Awards in March 2026, Zendaya's longtime stylist Law Roach announced that Zendaya and Holland were secretly married. Holland confirmed their marriage in an interview with Esquire UK in June 2026. The couple held a private wedding celebration two months later in Surrey.

== Filmography and accolades ==
Holland's accolades include a BAFTA Award, three Saturn Award for Best Performance by a Younger Actor for Captain America: Civil War (2016), Spider-Man: Homecoming (2017) and Far From Home, three Teen Choice Awards and two Nickelodeon Kids' Choice Awards.
