= Bobby Carpenter (American football) =

American football player (born 1983)

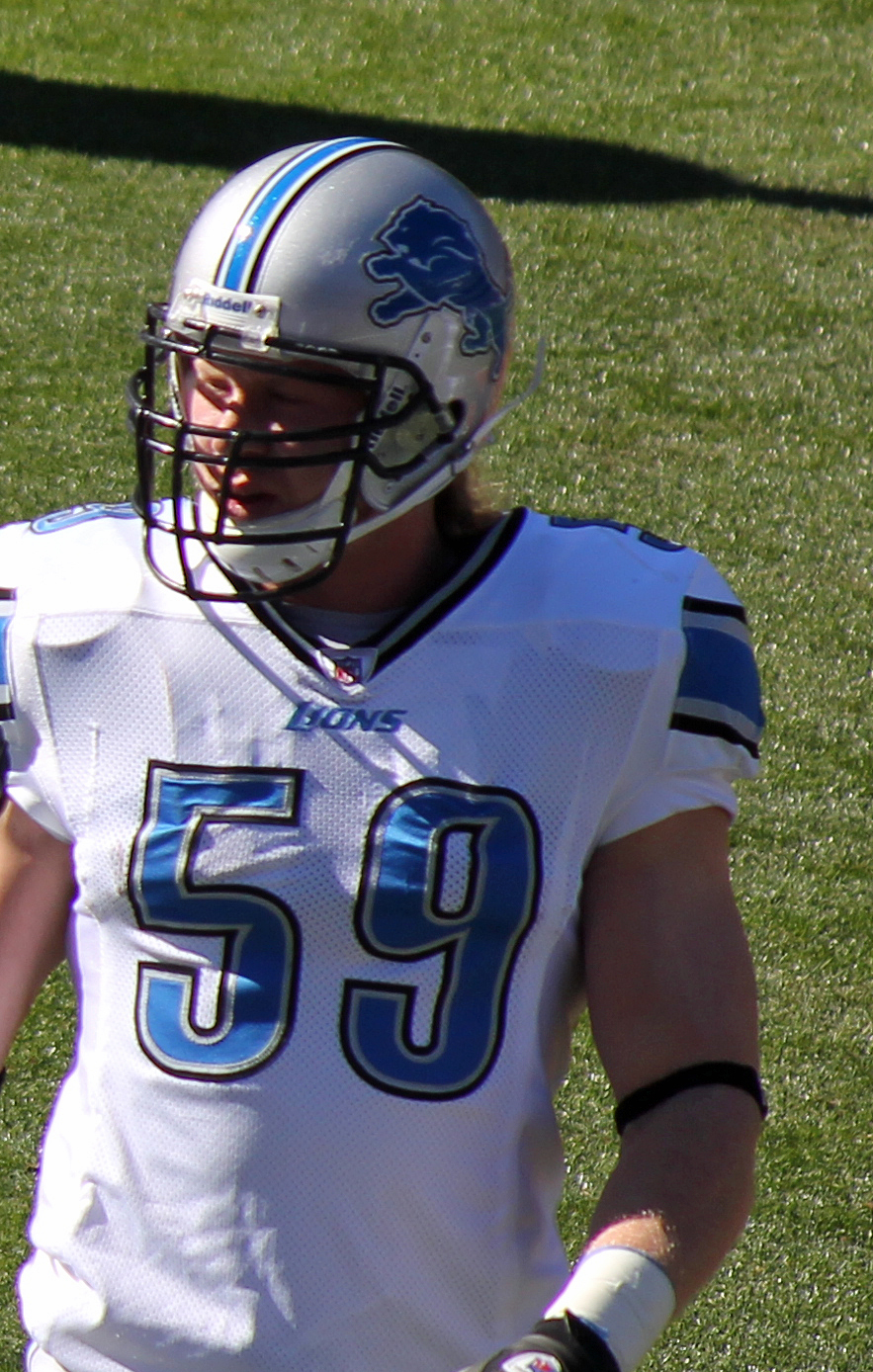
- Carpenter with the Detroit Lions in 2011

No. 54, 52, 50, 59
- Position: Linebacker

Personal information
- Born: August 1, 1983 (age 43); Lancaster, Ohio, U.S.
- Listed height: 6 ft 2 in (1.88 m)
- Listed weight: 249 lb (113 kg)

Career information
- High school: Lancaster
- College: Ohio State (2002–2005)
- NFL draft: 2006: 1st round, 18th overall pick

Career history
- Dallas Cowboys (2006–2009); St. Louis Rams (2010)*; Miami Dolphins (2010); Detroit Lions (2010–2011); New England Patriots (2012)
- * Offseason or practice squad member only

Awards and highlights
- BCS national champion (2002); Third-team All-American (2005); 2× Second-team All-Big Ten (2004, 2005)

Career NFL statistics
- Total tackles: 167
- Sacks: 3.5
- Fumble recoveries: 1
- Interceptions: 1
- Defensive touchdowns: 1
- Stats at Pro Football Reference

Robert Joseph Carpenter III (born August 1, 1983) is an American former professional football player who was a linebacker for seven seasons in the National Football League (NFL), primarily with the Dallas Cowboys. He played college football for the Ohio State Buckeyes, and was selected by the Cowboys in the first round of the 2006 NFL draft. He also played in the NFL for the Miami Dolphins, the Detroit Lions and the New England Patriots.

== Early life ==
Carpenter attended Lancaster High School in Lancaster, Ohio, alma mater of Super Bowl champion Jim Cordle. In addition to being a football standout, he was also a member of the swim team. During his senior year, Carpenter was selected All-Ohio first-team in football, and also went to the District Finals in swimming.

== College career ==
In 50 games at Ohio State, Carpenter started 26 times. He registered 191 tackles (121 solos), 14.5 sacks and 23.5 for losses, two forced fumbles, seven passes deflected passes and three interceptions.

In 2002, Carpenter played in every game as a true freshman. In 2003, Carpenter started three contests at strongside linebacker, totaling 37 tackles (24 solos), 4.5 sacks, 6.5 stops for losses and a pair of forced fumbles.

Carpenter was a full-time starter in 2004, lining up at strongside linebacker. He finished second on the team with 93 tackles (46 solos) and registered two sacks with 6.5 stops behind the line of scrimmage. He also deflected three passes and intercepted three others.

As a senior in 2005, Carpenter started first eleven games of the 2005 season, finishing fifth on the squad with 49 tackles and second on the team with eight sacks and 10.5 stops for losses, earning second-team All-Big Ten Conference honors. In the final game against Michigan, he fractured his right leg/ankle and was unable to play in the Fiesta Bowl.

== Professional career ==
Pre-draft measurables
Height	Weight	Arm length	Hand span	40-yard dash	20-yard shuttle	Three-cone drill	Bench press	Wonderlic
6 ft 2 1/2 in (1.89 m)	256 lb (116 kg)	31 1/2 in (0.80 m)	9 3/4 in (0.25 m)	4.65 s	4.31 s	6.88 s	20 reps	25
All values from NFL Combine

=== Dallas Cowboys ===
Carpenter was the Dallas Cowboys' first round selection (18th overall) in the 2006 NFL draft. It was later reported that head coach Bill Parcells influenced the organization into drafting him, based on his previous experience coaching his father, Rob Carpenter. His best game with the Cowboys came in a 2006 playoff loss to the Seattle Seahawks, where he started at outside linebacker and recorded five tackles and three deflected passes.

In 2009, he took over the team's nickel linebacker role after playing mostly on special teams. Over his four-year stint with the Cowboys, Carpenter failed to establish a starting role, registering 96 tackles and 29 special teams tackles. In the fourth episode of the 2008 Hard Knocks series, Carpenter was continuously beaten in a pads and shorts practice by right tackle Marc Colombo. During that practice Colombo referred to him as "Barbie Carpenter", while also making fun of his shoulder length blonde hair.

=== St. Louis Rams ===
Carpenter was traded from the Dallas Cowboys to the St. Louis Rams in exchange for offensive tackle Alex Barron on May 10, 2010. He was cut before the start of the season on September 4.

=== Miami Dolphins ===
On September 6, 2010, the Miami Dolphins signed Carpenter as a free agent, reuniting him with Bill Parcells, who drafted him with the Dallas Cowboys. He was waived on October 18, because of a mistake on his special teams blocking assignment against the Green Bay Packers, that came on the heels of two previous blocking assignment errors against the New England Patriots.

=== Detroit Lions ===
Carpenter was signed as a free agent by the Detroit Lions on October 20, 2010. Following the signings of Justin Durant and Stephen Tulloch, it looked like Carpenter would test free agency again, but he was re-signed after the injury and release of Zack Follett.

On October 2, 2011, Carpenter had six tackles, a pass deflected and made the play of the game, returning an interception for a touchdown, which sparked a second half come-from-behind victory against his former team, the Dallas Cowboys. The 24-point collapse was Dallas' largest blown lead in team history and eventually cost them a chance to qualify for the post-season.

=== New England Patriots ===
On April 5, 2012, Carpenter was signed as a free agent by the New England Patriots. He was among the team's final pre-season cuts on September 1. After fellow linebacker Dont'a Hightower suffered a hamstring injury, the Patriots re-signed Carpenter on October 3. He was released on October 31 after playing in four games for New England, mostly on special teams while registering two special teams tackles.

== NFL statistics ==
Year	Team	GP	COMB	TOTAL	AST	SACK	FF	FR	FR YDS	INT	IR YDS	AVG IR	LNG	TD	PD
2006	DAL	13	19	15	4	1.5	0	0	0	0	0	0	0	0	1
2007	DAL	16	18	11	7	0.0	0	0	0	0	0	0	0	0	0
2008	DAL	13	13	9	4	0.0	0	1	0	0	0	0	0	0	0
2009	DAL	16	46	37	9	2.0	0	0	0	0	0	0	0	0	1
2010	MIA	5	10	9	1	0.0	0	0	0	0	0	0	0	0	0
2010	DET	10	30	21	9	0.0	0	0	0	0	0	0	0	0	2
2011	DET	16	29	24	5	0.0	0	0	0	1	34	34	34	1	1
2012	NE	4	2	0	2	0.0	0	0	0	0	0	0	0	0	0
Career		93	167	126	41	3.5	0	1	0	1	34	34	34	1	5

== Media career ==
In 2013, Carpenter joined 97.1 The Fan WBNS-FM in Columbus, Ohio and currently serves as a co-host on the morning show, Morning Juice, airing from 6am - 9am. During that time he also appear on Wall to Wall Sports for WBNS 10TV, which was also owned by Dispatch Media Group now owned by Tegna Inc. Carpenter has worked the Ohio State Spring game since 2016 for BTN and has been a color analyst for ESPN 3 since 2017.

In 2018, Carpenter became a regular contributor to ESPN's Get Up, which airs daily from 8 AM to 10 AM EST.

In 2021, Carpenter began making appearances on The Pat McAfee Show. He is jokingly referred to as "General Bob", due to his "rallying of the troops" which led to the Big Ten Conference reversing their decision to suspend the 2020 season. In 2023, he has a recurring college football segment, in which he ranks the top five football programs of the past weekend. It has since become a running joke that he always picks his alma mater, Ohio State, as number one.

== Personal life ==
Carpenter is the son of former Houston Oilers, New York Giants and Los Angeles Rams running back Rob Carpenter. Carpenter and his father both played for Bill Parcells. He has three younger brothers: Jonathan, Georgie and Nathan. Carpenter is married to his wife Cortney, with whom he has four children.

After completing his NFL career in 2013, Carpenter returned to Ohio State and completed his MBA with a specialization in Finance and Strategy. He is now an adjunct professor teaching a course at the Fisher College of Business in Private Equity.

Carpenter is currently a board member of the 2nd and Seven Foundation, which promotes literacy to second graders throughout Columbus, Ohio, and the nation, and heavily involved with the Buckeye Cruise for Cancer that has raised over $20 million for the James Cancer Hospital since 2008.

In April 2022, Carpenter opened Carpenter Heating, Cooling, Plumbing, and Electric in Columbus with co-owner Jeff Fry. He said it is a division of Freeland Contracting, which does large commercial jobs. Carpenter's company will focus on residential clients in central Ohio.
