= Billy Milligan =

American criminal (1955–2014)

- Born: William Stanley Morrison; February 14, 1955; Miami Beach, Florida
- Died: December 12, 2014 (aged 59); Columbus, Ohio
- Other name: The Campus Rapist
- Known for: being the Campus Rapist, the diagnosis of dissociative identity disorder
- Criminal charges: Aggravated rape, armed robbery

Details
- Victims: 4
- Date: 1975–1977

William Stanley Milligan (February 14, 1955 – December 12, 2014), also known as The Campus Rapist, was an American man who was the subject of a highly publicized court case in Ohio in the late 1970s.

After having committed several felonies including armed robbery, he was arrested for three rapes on the campus of Ohio State University. Psychologists diagnosed Milligan with dissociative identity disorder, during preparations for trial. His lawyers pleaded insanity, claiming two of his alternate personalities committed the crimes without Milligan being aware of it. He was the first person diagnosed with dissociative identity disorder to raise such a defense, and the first acquitted of a major crime for this reason, instead spending a decade in psychiatric hospitals.

Milligan's life story was popularized by Daniel Keyes's award-winning non-fiction book The Minds of Billy Milligan.

== Early life ==
Milligan was born William Stanley Morrison on February 14, 1955, in Miami Beach, to Dorothy Pauline Sands and Johnny Morrison.

Dorothy grew up in Ohio farm country and lived in Lancaster with her first husband. They divorced, and Dorothy eventually moved to the Miami area, where she worked as a singer. There she began living with Johnny Morrison. Dorothy and Morrison had two other children: a son, Jim, born in October 1953, and a daughter, Kathy Jo, born in December 1956.

Morrison struggled with fatherhood, and according to Daniel Keyes, "Meeting the medical expenses overwhelmed Johnny. He borrowed more, gambled more, drank more... He was hospitalized for acute alcoholism and depression in ... 1958." In what appeared to be a suicide attempt, according to Keyes, "Dorothy found him slumped over the table, half a bottle of Scotch and an empty bottle of sleeping pills on the floor." A few months after this attempt, on January 17, 1959, Johnny killed himself by carbon monoxide poisoning.

Dorothy took her children and moved away from Miami, eventually returning to Lancaster, Ohio. There, she remarried her ex-husband. This marriage lasted about a year. In 1962, she met Chalmer Milligan (1927–1988). Chalmer's first wife Bernice divorced him on the "grounds of gross neglect". He had a daughter, Challa, the same age as Billy, and another daughter who was a nurse. Dorothy and Chalmer married in Circleville, Ohio, on October 27, 1963; Chalmer had adopted Dorothy's children and legally changed their surnames from "Morrison" to "Milligan".

At his later trial, Chalmer was blamed for abusing Billy. Keyes claimed that Billy had multiple personalities from a much earlier age, however, with his first three (no-name boy, Christene, and Shawn) appearing by the time he was five years old.

== Arrest ==
In 1975, Milligan was imprisoned at Lebanon Correctional Institution in Ohio for rape and armed robbery. He was released on parole in early 1977. In October 1977, Milligan was arrested for raping three women on the Ohio State University campus. He was identified by one of his victims from existing police mug shots of sex offenders, and from fingerprints lifted from another victim's car.

Since he used a gun during the crime and guns were found in a search of his residence, he had violated his parole as well. He was indicted on "three counts of [kidnapping], three counts of aggravated robbery and four counts of rape." He was placed in the Ohio State Penitentiary pending trial.

In the course of preparing his defense, he underwent a psychological examination by Dr. Willis C. Driscoll, who diagnosed Milligan with schizophrenia. He was then examined by psychologist Dorothy Turner of Southwest Community Mental Health Center in Columbus, Ohio. During this examination, Turner concluded that Milligan had dissociative identity disorder. Milligan's public defenders, Gary Schweickart and Judy Stevenson, pleaded an insanity defense, and he was committed "until such time as he regains sanity".

== Incarceration ==
Milligan was sent to a series of state-run psychiatric hospitals, such as the Athens State Hospital, where, by his report, he received very little help. While he was in these hospitals, Milligan reported having ten different personalities. These ten were the only ones known to psychologists. Later on an additional 14 personalities, labeled "The Undesirables", were claimed. Among the first ten were Arthur, a prim and proper Englishman who was an expert in science, medicine and hematology; Allen, a manipulator; Tommy, an escape artist and technophile; Ragen Vadascovinich, a Yugoslav communist who Milligan claimed had committed the robberies in a kind of Robin Hood spirit; and Adalana, a 19-year-old lesbian (shy, lonely and introverted) who cooked for all the personalities and craved affection, and who had allegedly committed the rapes.

Milligan received treatment from psychiatrist David Caul MD, who diagnosed the additional 14 personalities.

In 1986, Milligan escaped the mental facility where he had been committed. During this time, he went by an alias (Christopher Carr) and might have been guilty of abducting his roommate and killing him, one of two murders of which Milligan is suspected.

== Release ==
Milligan was released in 1988 after a decade in psychiatric hospitals, where he moved back to Lancaster, Ohio with his mother for a couple of years. On August 1, 1991, he was discharged from the Ohio mental health system and the Ohio courts. In 1996, he lived in California where he owned Stormy Life Productions and was going to make a short film (which apparently was never made). His location, thereafter, remained for a long time unknown, his former acquaintances having lost contact with him. According to his sister, he had been living on her property in Ohio when he was diagnosed with cancer in 2012, and lived with her for the remainder of his life.

== Death ==
Milligan died of cancer at a nursing home in Columbus, Ohio, on December 12, 2014. He was 59 years old.

== In media ==
=== Books ===
Daniel Keyes authored a biographical non-fiction novel called The Minds of Billy Milligan (1981). His follow-up book, The Milligan Wars, was published in Japan in 1994, in Taiwan in 2000, in France in 2009, in Ukraine in 2018, but not in the United States, first owing to Milligan's ongoing lawsuit against the State of Ohio for the allegedly inadequate treatment he received in Ohio facilities, then to the desire to tie its release to an in-development film.

=== Film ===
Several attempts had been made by Hollywood to adapt Keyes' book. In the early 1990s, James Cameron co-wrote a screenplay with Todd Graff for a film version he was to direct then-titled A Crowded Room. This adaptation never came into fruition because Cameron was sued by adaptation rightsholder Sandy Arcara, demanding "her salary should be raised from $250,000 to $1.5 million"; seeing the project stalled, Milligan also sued Cameron in 1993.

After Cameron left the project, Warner Bros. continued to develop the now slightly retitled The Crowded Room, with directors Joel Schumacher, David Fincher, Nick Cassavetes, F. Gary Gray, and Gus Van Sant attached at various points. Actors courted for the role of Milligan included Matthew McConaughey, Johnny Depp, Brad Pitt, Billy Crudup, Sean Penn and John Cusack. In February 2015, it was confirmed Leonardo DiCaprio would star as Milligan, and Jason Smilovic was set to pen the script.

The 2016 psychological horror film Split is loosely based on Milligan’s crimes.

=== Television ===
In 2021, it was announced that The Crowded Room would instead be adapted as a ten-episode television series on Apple TV+, starring Tom Holland, rather than the unrealized DiCaprio project.

In 2021, Netflix released a four-part documentary entitled Monsters Inside: The 24 Faces of Billy Milligan. The series was directed by Olivier Megaton. The docuseries mentions how Milligan had confessed to his niece that he was a murderer prior to his death, and links him to two unsolved murders. The series also features video interviews with various people connected to the case and tape recordings of Milligan's psychiatric sessions.
