= List of roles and awards of Tom Holland =

Tom Holland at The Odyssey premiere in New York City

English actor Tom Holland started his acting in theatre with a supporting role in 2008 for Billy Elliot the Musical and was promoted to the title role that year, which he played until 2010. He then made his film debut in the disaster drama The Impossible (2012) opposite Naomi Watts and Ewan McGregor. He went on to appear in the films How I Live Now (2013) with Saoirse Ronan and In the Heart of the Sea (2015) with Chris Hemsworth. He also played Gregory Cromwell in the miniseries Wolf Hall (2015) and Danny Sullivan in the miniseries The Crowded Room (2023).

In 2016, he made his debut in the Marvel Cinematic Universe (MCU) playing Spider-Man / Peter Parker in Captain America: Civil War (2016). He would go on to play the role for six of the franchise's films, including Avengers: Infinity War (2018), Endgame (2019), and his own standalone films Spider-Man: Homecoming (2017), Far From Home (2019), No Way Home (2021), and Brand New Day (2026). He has also starred in the films The Lost City of Z (2016), The Current War (2017), Spies in Disguise (2019), Onward (2020), The Devil All the Time (2020), Cherry (2021), Uncharted (2022) and The Odyssey (2026). He made his return to theatre since his debut in Billy Elliot the Musical, to star in the Jamie Lloyd's production for West End revival of Romeo & Juliet alongside Francesca Amewudah-Rivers, which had a limited run for 12 weeks from May to August 2024.

== Filmography ==
Key
†	Denotes films that have not yet been released

=== Films ===
Year	Title	Role	Notes	Ref.
2010	Arrietty	Shō	English dub; voice role	
2012	The Impossible	Lucas Bennett		
2013	How I Live Now	Isaac		
2013	Locke	Eddie Locke	Voice role	
2014	Billy Elliot the Musical Live	Former Billy	Cameo	
2015	In the Heart of the Sea	Thomas Nickerson		
2016	Captain America: Civil War	Peter Parker / Spider-Man		
2016	Edge of Winter	Bradley Baker		
2016	A Monster Calls	Monster	Stand-in for Liam Neeson	
2016	The Lost City of Z	Jack Fawcett		
2017	Pilgrimage	The Novice / Brother Diarmuid		
2017	Spider-Man: Homecoming	Peter Parker / Spider-Man		
2017	The Current War	Samuel Insull		
2018	Avengers: Infinity War	Peter Parker / Spider-Man		
2019	Avengers: Endgame	Peter Parker / Spider-Man		
2019	Spider-Man: Far From Home	Peter Parker / Spider-Man		
2019	Peter's To-Do List	Peter Parker / Spider-Man	Short film	
2019	Spies in Disguise	Walter Beckett	Voice role	
2020	Dolittle	Jip	Voice role	
2020	Onward	Ian Lightfoot	Voice role	
2020	The Devil All the Time	Arvin Russell		
2021	Cherry	Cherry		
2021	Chaos Walking	Todd Hewitt		
2021	Venom: Let There Be Carnage	Peter Parker / Spider-Man	Uncredited cameo; mid-credits scene	
2021	Spider-Man: No Way Home	Peter Parker / Spider-Man		
2022	Uncharted	Nathan Drake	Also executive producer	
2026	The Odyssey	Telemachus		
2026	Spider-Man: Brand New Day	Peter Parker / Spider-Man		

=== Television ===
Year	Title	Role	Notes	Ref.
2015	Wolf Hall	Gregory Cromwell	6 episodes	
2017	Lip Sync Battle	Himself	Episode: "Zendaya vs. Tom Holland"	
2023	The Crowded Room	Danny Sullivan	Lead role, 10 episodes; also executive producer	

=== Web ===
Year	Title	Role	Notes	Ref.
2021	Fortnite Winterfest Trailer - Featuring Spiderman	Peter Parker / Spider-Man (voice)		
2021	The Daily Bugle	Peter Parker	Episode: "A Daily Bugle exclusive sit-down with Spider-Menace himself, Peter Parker"	
2025	Never Stop Playing	The Gamechanger / The Innovator / The Creator		
2026	Celebrity Substitute	Himself	Episode: "Tom Holland Films an Action Movie with Kids"	

=== Theatre ===
Year	Title	Role	Venue	Notes	Ref.
2008–2010	Billy Elliot the Musical	Billy Elliot / Michael Caffrey	Victoria Palace Theatre	West End	
2024	Romeo and Juliet	Romeo Montague	Duke of York's Theatre	West End	

=== Video games ===
Year	Title	Role	Notes	Ref.
2019	Spider-Man: Far From Home Virtual Reality Experience	Peter Parker / Spider-Man	Voice; Virtual Reality Gaming	

=== Theme Park ===
Year	Title	Role	Notes	Ref.
2021	Web Slingers: A Spider-Man Adventure	Peter Parker / Spider-Man	Ride pre-show	

== Awards and nominations ==
Awards and nominations received by Tom Holland
Award	Year (Note: Indicates the year of ceremony. Each year is linked to the article about the awards held that year, wherever possible.)	Category	Nominated work	Result	Ref.
Annie Awards	2021	Outstanding Achievement for Voice Acting in a Feature Production	Onward	Nominated	
British Academy Film Awards	2017	Rising Star Award	—N/a	Won	
CEC Awards	2013	Best New Actor	The Impossible	Nominated	
Chicago Film Critics Association	2012	Most Promising Performer	The Impossible	Nominated	
Critics' Choice Movie Awards	2013	Best Young Actor/Actress	The Impossible	Nominated	
Critics' Choice Super Awards	2021	Best Voice Actor in an Animated Movie	Onward	Nominated	
Critics' Choice Super Awards	2022	Best Actor in a Superhero Movie	Spider-Man: No Way Home	Nominated	
Critics' Choice Television Awards	2024	Best Actor in a Limited Series or Movie Made for Television	The Crowded Room	Nominated	
Empire Awards	2013	Best Male Newcomer	The Impossible	Won	
Empire Awards	2017	Best Male Newcomer	Captain America: Civil War	Nominated	
Goya Awards	2013	Best New Actor	The Impossible	Nominated	
Hollywood Film Awards	2012	Spotlight Award	The Impossible	Won	
Jupiter Award	2020	Best International Actor	Spider-Man: Far From Home	Won	
London Film Critics' Circle	2013	Young British Performer of the Year	The Impossible	Won	
London Film Critics' Circle	2018	Young British/Irish Performer of the Year	The Lost City of Z / Spider-Man: Homecoming	Nominated	
MTV Millennial Awards	2022	Flames Couple (Note: Shared with Zendaya)	—N/a	Nominated	
MTV Movie & TV Awards	2022	Best Performance in a Movie	Spider-Man: No Way Home	Won	
MTV Movie & TV Awards	2022	Best Hero	Spider-Man: No Way Home	Nominated	
MTV Movie & TV Awards	2022	Best Kiss	Spider-Man: No Way Home	Nominated	
MTV Movie & TV Awards	2022	Best Team (Note: Shared with Andrew Garfield and Tobey Maguire)	Spider-Man: No Way Home	Nominated	
National Board of Review	2013	Breakthrough Performance – Male	The Impossible	Won	
National Film Awards UK	2017	Best Newcomer	—N/a	Nominated	
Nickelodeon Kids' Choice Awards	2020	Favorite Movie Actor	Spider-Man: Far From Home	Nominated	
Nickelodeon Kids' Choice Awards	2020	Favorite Superhero	Spider-Man: Far From Home / Avengers: Endgame	Won	
Nickelodeon Kids' Choice Awards	2022	Favorite Movie Actor	Spider-Man: No Way Home	Won	
Nickelodeon Kids' Choice Awards	2026	Favorite Movie Actor	Spider-Man: Brand New Day	Won	
People's Choice Awards	2019	Male Movie Star of 2019	Spider-Man: Far From Home	Nominated	
People's Choice Awards	2019	Action Movie Star of 2019	Spider-Man: Far From Home	Won	
Saturn Awards	2013	Best Performance by a Younger Actor	The Impossible	Nominated	
Saturn Awards	2017	Best Performance by a Younger Actor	Captain America: Civil War	Won	
Saturn Awards	2018	Best Performance by a Younger Actor	Spider-Man: Homecoming	Won	
Saturn Awards	2019	Best Performance by a Younger Actor	Spider-Man: Far From Home	Won	
Saturn Awards	2022	Best Actor	Spider-Man: No Way Home	Nominated	
Teen Choice Awards	2016	Choice Movie: Scene Stealer	Captain America: Civil War	Nominated	
Teen Choice Awards	2017	Choice Breakout Movie Star	Spider-Man: Homecoming	Nominated	
Teen Choice Awards	2017	Choice Summer Movie Actor	Spider-Man: Homecoming	Won	
Teen Choice Awards	2018	Choice Action Movie Actor	Avengers: Infinity War	Nominated	
Teen Choice Awards	2019	Choice Summer Movie Actor	Spider-Man: Far From Home	Won	
Washington D.C. Area Film Critics Association	2012	Best Youth Performance	The Impossible	Nominated	
Washington D.C. Area Film Critics Association	2021	Best Voice Performance	Onward	Nominated	
WhatsOnStage Awards	2025	Best Performer in a Play	Romeo & Juliet	Nominated	
Young Artist Award	2013	Best Performance in a Feature Film – Leading Young Actor	The Impossible	Won	
Young Artist Award	2016	Best Performance in a Feature Film – Supporting Young Actor (14–21)	In the Heart of the Sea	Nominated	
