= The Crowded Room =

American drama television series

- Genre: Drama; Psychological thriller
- Created by: Akiva Goldsman
- Inspired by: The Minds of Billy Milligan by Daniel Keyes
- Developed by: Todd Graff
- Starring: Tom Holland; Amanda Seyfried; Sasha Lane; Will Chase; Lior Raz; Emmy Rossum
- Composer: Trevor Gureckis
- Country of origin: United States
- Original language: English
- No. of episodes: 10

Production
- Executive producers: Arnon Milchan; Yariv Milchan; Michael Schaefer; Kornél Mundruczó; Suzanne Heathcote; Alexandra Milchan; Tom Holland; Akiva Goldsman
- Producer: Kata Wéber
- Cinematography: Ksenia Sereda; William Rexer
- Editors: Christopher Rand; Kevin Birou; Dávid Jancsó
- Running time: 38–56 minutes
- Production companies: Apple Studios; New Regency; Weed Road Pictures; EMJAG Productions

Original release
- Network: Apple TV+
- Release: June 9 – July 28, 2023

The Crowded Room is an American psychological thriller miniseries created by Akiva Goldsman and inspired by the 1981 non-fiction novel The Minds of Billy Milligan by Daniel Keyes. Tom Holland, Amanda Seyfried, and Emmy Rossum lead a cast that includes Sasha Lane, Will Chase, Lior Raz, Laila Robins, and Henry Eikenberry.

The series follows Danny Sullivan (Holland) after he was arrested for his involvement in a New York City shooting in 1979. Danny unveils his life through a series of interviews with interrogator Rya Goodwin (Seyfried), and slowly details to Rya, and the audience, his mysterious past that led him to the fateful incident. As Danny retrospectively examines his life, he reckons with his past and a few pivotal moments, ultimately leading him to uncover a life-altering revelation.

On June 9, 2023, The Crowded Room premiered with its first three episodes on Apple TV+. One each of the remaining seven episodes was released weekly through July 28, 2023. The series received negative reviews from critics.

== Cast ==
=== Main ===
- Tom Holland as Danny Sullivan, a character based on Billy Milligan
- Amanda Seyfried as Rya Goodwin
- Sasha Lane as Ariana Atkinson
- Will Chase as Marlin Reid
- Lior Raz as Yitzhak Safdie
- Emmy Rossum as Candy Sullivan

=== Recurring ===
- Emma Laird as Annabelle Stone
- Levon Hawke as Jonny
- Stephen Barrington as Angelo
- Thomas Sadoski as Matty Dunn
- Sam Vartholomeos as Mike
- Christopher Abbott as Stan Camisa
- Jason Isaacs as Jack Lamb
- Carmen Ejogo as Patricia Richards

=== Guest ===
- Nuala Cleary as Eden
- Laila Robins as Susie
- Richard Blackwood as a Homeless man
- Frank Wood as Dean Martin Hughs
- Henry Eikenberry as Doug
- Cameron Douglas as a Cellmate
- Henry Zaga as Philip
- Elijah Jones as Jerome
- Daniel London as Greg
- Akiva Goldsman as Doctor

== Episodes ==
No.	Title	Directed by	Written by	Original release date
1	"Exodus"	Kornél Mundruczó	Akiva Goldsman	June 9, 2023
Danny Sullivan is arrested for a violent crime. Rya Goodwin probes his troubled past for answers.
2	"Sanctuary"	Kornél Mundruczó	Akiva Goldsman	June 9, 2023
Rya visits the Ghost House. Danny opens up about his turbulent friendship with Ariana.
3	"Murder"	Brady Corbet	Akiva Goldsman	June 9, 2023
Danny gets a gift for Ariana. Annabelle returns. Rya pieces together the events leading up to Rockefeller Center.
4	"London"	Brady Corbet	Akiva Goldsman and Henrietta Ashworth & Jessica Ashworth	June 16, 2023
In the aftermath of the shooting, Danny flees the country to find his father.
5	"Savior"	Kornél Mundruczó	Akiva Goldsman	June 23, 2023
Danny’s and Candy’s lives are forever changed by the arrival of an unlikely savior.
6	"Rya"	Mona Fastvold	Akiva Goldsman and Suzanne Heathcote	June 30, 2023
Rya puts her career on the line to investigate a radical new theory.
7	"The Crowded Room"	Alan Taylor	Akiva Goldsman and Suzanne Heathcote	July 7, 2023
Danny finally faces the truth about his crime.
8	"Reunion"	Brady Corbet	Akiva Goldsman and Cortney Norris	July 14, 2023
As the trial approaches, Rya and Stan disagree over strategy. Danny struggles to sort through his past.
9	"Family"	Mona Fastvold	Akiva Goldsman and Gregory Lessans	July 21, 2023
The state of New York v. Danny Sullivan.
10	"Judgment"	Mona Fastvold	Akiva Goldsman & Suzanne Heathcote & Gregory Lessans	July 28, 2023
Series finale. Danny’s life hangs in the balance.

== Production ==
=== Development ===
In April 2021, Akiva Goldsman was set to write The Crowded Room, a 10-episode anthology television series with the adaptation of Daniel Keyes' nonfiction novel The Minds of Billy Milligan for Apple TV+. Goldsman was also set to produce the series through his Weed Road company with Tom Holland, Alexandra Milchan through EMJAG Productions, and Arnon Milchan, Yariv Milchan and Michael Schaefer through New Regency. The season was later revealed to actually be based on Goldsman's own life with inspiration from Keyes' book. Kornél Mundruczó was hired to direct the season and serve as an executive producer as well alongside Suzanne Heathcote. Writers for the season include Akiva Goldsman, Henrietta Ashworth, Jessica Ashworth, Suzanne Heathcote, Cortney Norris and Gregory Lessans.

=== Casting ===
In April 2021, Holland was cast in the lead role, initially believed to be Billy Milligan, but later revealed to be a character named Danny Sullivan (still loosely based on Milligan). Goldsman was quoted saying that Holland was "the first and only person" he approached to play Danny. In February 2022, Amanda Seyfried, Emmy Rossum, Will Chase, Sasha Lane, Christopher Abbott and Emma Laird would be added to the cast. In May, Jason Isaacs and Lior Raz joined the cast.

=== Filming ===
Principal photography on the series began on March 31, 2022, in New York City. Among the noteworthy filming locations is NBC Studios, located in historic 30 Rockefeller Plaza. Filming wrapped on September 28, 2022.

In May 2023, Holland revealed to Entertainment Weekly that while he had "really enjoyed playing Danny in those earlier episodes where I was able to lean into my more vulnerable side", he had also suffered a toll on his personal mental health. Holland told EW that the mental aspect "really beat me up and it took a long time for me to recover afterwards". He cited an incident nine months into filming where he had had "a bit of a meltdown at home", experiencing difficulty in separating his own life from his character's.

== Release ==
The Crowded Room premiered its first three episodes on June 9, 2023, and subsequently released one episode per week until July 28.

=== Music ===
The soundtrack for The Crowded Room by Trevor Gureckis was released on June 9, 2023 on Platoon Records and mixed for Apple's "Spatial Audio" format.

In addition to original music, The Crowded Room features period accurate songs from artists including Lobo, Bill Withers, Jefferson Starship, Meat Loaf & Ellen Foley, Dusty Springfield, Joy Division, Alice Cooper, The Clash, The Beach Boys, Three Dog Night, Pink Floyd, and Thelma Houston. Acting as a plot device, Let it be by The Beatles is used repeatedly throughout the season.

== Reception ==
=== Critical response ===
The review aggregator website Rotten Tomatoes reported a 33% approval score with an average rating of 4.8/10 based on 54 reviews. The website's critics consensus reads, "The Crowded Room is furnished with undeniable talent and built on a promising premise, but the story runs in circles, resulting in an exhausting and often frustrating experience." Metacritic, which uses a weighted average, assigned a score of 48 out of 100 based on 26 critics, indicating "mixed or average reviews".

=== Accolades ===
Year	Award	Category	Recipient	Result	Ref.
2024	29th Critics' Choice Awards	Best Actor in a Limited Series or Movie Made for Television	Tom Holland	Nominated	
