= The Minds of Billy Milligan =

1981 non-fiction novel by Daniel Keyes

- 1981 edition cover
- Author: Daniel Keyes
- Genre: Biography
- Publisher: Random House (1981); Bantam Books (1982, 1995)
- Publication date: October 1981
- Publication place: United States
- Media type: Print (hardcover & paperback)
- Pages: 374 (1981); 426 (1982,1995)
- ISBN: 0-3945-1943-4
- OCLC: 7574826

The Minds of Billy Milligan is a 1981 non-fiction novel by Hugo Award-winning author Daniel Keyes. It tells the story of Billy Milligan, the first person in U.S. history acquitted of a major crime by pleading dissociative identity disorder.

A sequel, The Milligan Wars, was published in Japan in 1994.

== Awards ==
=== Won ===
- 1986: Kurd Lasswitz Award for Best Book by a Foreign Author
- 1993: Seiun Award for Non-Fiction of the Year

=== Nominated ===
- 1982: Edgar Award for Best Fact Crime

== Adaptation ==
The book inspired the 2023 Apple TV+ miniseries The Crowded Room, starring Tom Holland and Amanda Seyfried.
