= Nadia Khomami =

British journalist

Nadia Khomami is a British journalist. She is arts and culture correspondent for The Guardian.

Khomani holds a bachelor's degree in law from Durham University and a master's degree in journalism from City University. She began her journalism career at the Daily Telegraph. Other publications that have included her articles include Huffington Post and The Independent.

Khomami has narrated several audiobooks.
