= Lancaster, Ohio =

- City
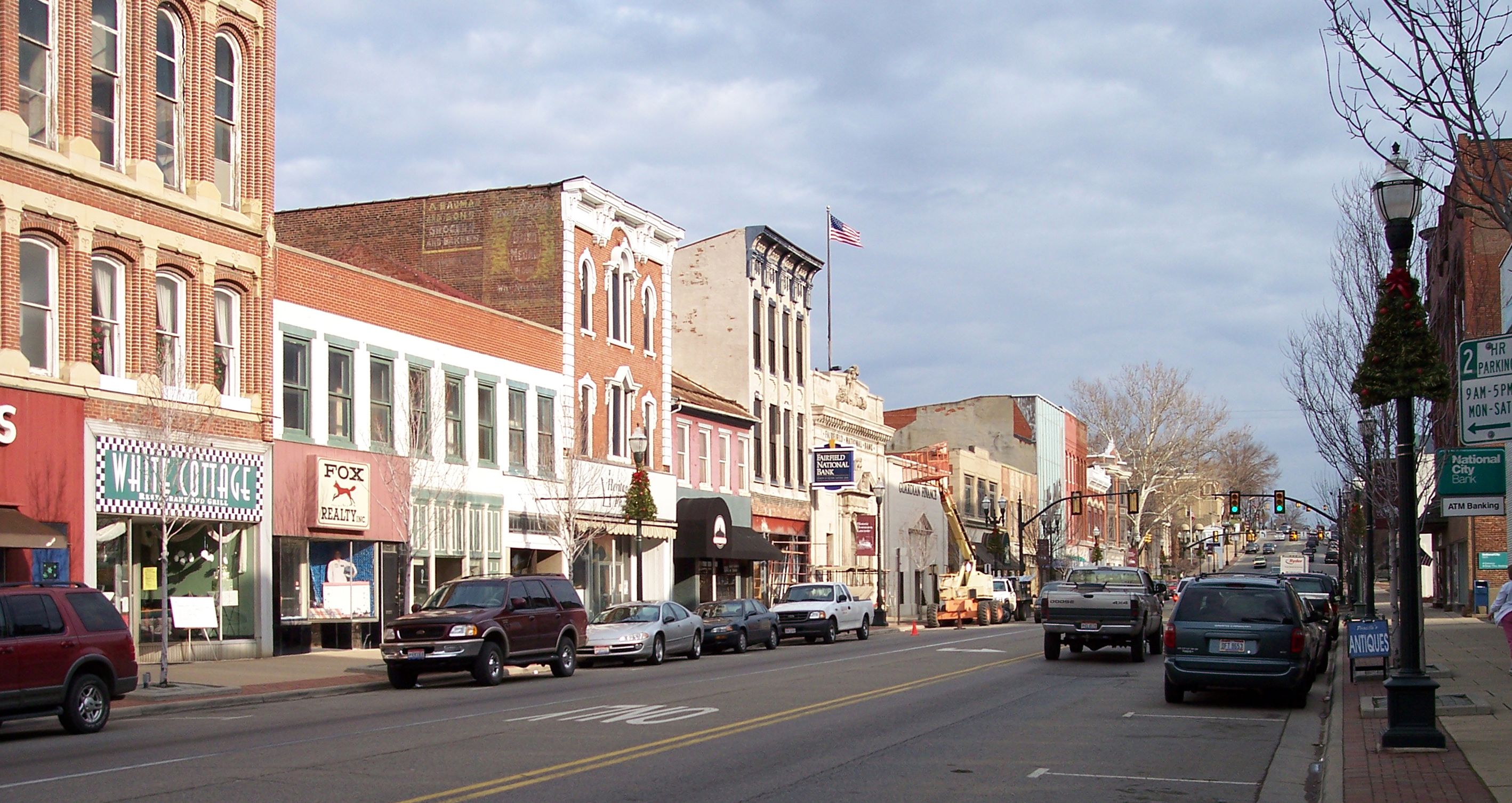
- Main Street in Downtown Lancaster
- Nicknames: "Glass City", "The Stir", "L Town"
- Interactive map of Lancaster, Ohio
- Location within Ohio Location within the United States
- Coordinates: 39°44′35″N 82°36′25″W
- Country: United States
- State: Ohio
- County: Fairfield

Government
  - Type: Mayor-council
  - Mayor: Don McDaniel (R)

Area
  - Total: 19.03 sq mi (49.29 km^{2})
  - Land: 18.97 sq mi (49.12 km^{2})
  - Water: 0.066 sq mi (0.17 km^{2})
- Elevation: 840 ft (260 m)

Population (2020)
  - Total: 40,552
  - Density: 2,138/sq mi (825.5/km^{2})
- Demonym: Lancastrian
- Time zone: UTC−5 (EST)
  - Summer (DST): UTC−4 (EDT)
- ZIP Code: 43130
- Area codes: 740 and 220
- FIPS code: 39-41720
- GNIS feature ID: 1086078
- Website: lancasterohio.gov

Lancaster (locally /ˈlæŋk(ə)stər/ LANK-(ə-)stər) is a city in Fairfield County, Ohio, and its county seat. The population was 40,552 at the 2020 United States census, making it Ohio's 30th largest city, having surpassed Warren and Findlay due to its own growth while the latter two cities declined. The city is near the Hocking River in the south-central part of the state, about 33 miles (53 km) southeast of Columbus and 38 miles (61 km) southwest of Zanesville. It is part of the Columbus metropolitan area.

== History ==
The earliest known inhabitants of the southeastern and central Ohio region were the Hopewell, Adena, and Fort Ancient Native Americans, of whom little evidence survived, beyond the burial and ceremonial mounds built throughout the Ohio and Mississippi Valleys. Many mounds and burial sites have also yielded archaeological artifacts. Serpent Mound and Hopewell Culture National Historical Park, though not in Fairfield County, are nearby.

Before and immediately after European settlement, the land today comprising Lancaster and Fairfield County was inhabited by the Shawnee, nations of the Iroquois, Wyandot, and other Native American tribes. It served as a natural crossroads for the inter- and intra-tribal wars fought at various times. Frontier explorer Christopher Gist reached Lancaster's vicinity on January 19, 1751, when he visited the small Delaware town of Hockhocking nearby. Leaving the area the next day, Gist rode southwest to Maguck, another Delaware town near Circleville.

Having been ceded to the United States by Great Britain after the American Revolution in the Treaty of Paris, the lands north of the Ohio River and west of the Appalachian Mountains were incorporated into the Northwest Territory in 1787. White settlers began to encroach on Native American lands in the Northwest Territory. As the new United States government began to cast its eye westward, the stage was set for the series of campaigns that culminated in the Battle of Fallen Timbers in 1794 and the Treaty of Greenville in 1795. With pioneer settlement within Ohio made legal and safe from Indian raids, developers began to speculate in land sales in earnest.

Knowing that such speculation, combined with congressional grants of land sections to veterans of the Revolution, could result in a lucrative opportunity, in 1796 Ebenezer Zane petitioned Congress to grant him a contract to blaze a trail through Ohio, from Wheeling, West Virginia, to Limestone, Kentucky (near modern Maysville, Kentucky), a distance of 266 miles (428 km). As part of the deal, Zane was awarded square-mile tracts of land at the points where his trace crossed the Hocking, Muskingum, and Scioto Rivers. Zane's Trace, as it is now known, was completed by 1797. As Zane's sons began to carve the square-mile tract astride the Hocking into saleable plots, the village of Lancaster was founded in 1800. Lancaster antedated the formal establishment of the state of Ohio by three years. Many villages and townships right outside Lancaster, such as Lithopolis, Royalton, and Greencastle, were settled around the same time, which contributed to the village's success.

Initially known as New Lancaster, the town's name was shortened to Lancaster by an act of the legislature in 1805, and it was incorporated in 1831. The Lancaster Lateral Canal opened to commerce in 1834; according to the city, canal transportation opened eastern markets to the area, contributing to local prosperity. The wider Ohio and Erie Canal system also carried agricultural goods such as oats, pork, lard, cheese and wool to eastern markets.

The initial settlers were predominantly German immigrants and their descendants, many from Lancaster, Pennsylvania. Ohio's longest continuously operating newspaper, the Lancaster Eagle-Gazette, was born of a merger of the early Ohio Adler, founded around 1807, with the Ohio Gazette, founded in the 1830s. The two papers were ferocious competitors since they were on opposite sides of the American Civil War, with the Adler antislavery and pro-Union. The city also had numerous migrants from the Upper South who sympathized with the Confederacy. The papers merged in 1937, 72 years after the war's end. This was shortly after the Gazette was acquired by glassmaker Anchor-Hocking. The newspaper is currently part of the Newspaper Network of Central Ohio, a unit of Gannett Company, Inc.

== Geography ==
According to the United States Census Bureau, the city has a total area of 18.90 square miles (48.95 km^{2}), of which 0.06 square miles (0.16 km^{2}) is covered by water.

=== Climate ===
Climate data for Lancaster, Ohio, 1991–2020 normals, extremes 1997–present
Month	Jan	Feb	Mar	Apr	May	Jun	Jul	Aug	Sep	Oct	Nov	Dec	Year
Record high °F (°C)	72 (22)	79 (26)	86 (30)	88 (31)	92 (33)	99 (37)	100 (38)	99 (37)	97 (36)	91 (33)	81 (27)	74 (23)	100 (38)
Mean maximum °F (°C)	62.5 (16.9)	64.0 (17.8)	74.3 (23.5)	83.1 (28.4)	89.3 (31.8)	92.3 (33.5)	93.1 (33.9)	92.0 (33.3)	91.3 (32.9)	83.7 (28.7)	72.4 (22.4)	64.2 (17.9)	94.2 (34.6)
Mean daily maximum °F (°C)	37.5 (3.1)	41.3 (5.2)	51.6 (10.9)	64.8 (18.2)	74.1 (23.4)	82.0 (27.8)	85.0 (29.4)	84.1 (28.9)	78.1 (25.6)	65.8 (18.8)	53.0 (11.7)	41.8 (5.4)	63.3 (17.4)
Daily mean °F (°C)	29.5 (−1.4)	32.6 (0.3)	41.7 (5.4)	53.0 (11.7)	63.0 (17.2)	71.6 (22.0)	74.9 (23.8)	73.4 (23.0)	66.5 (19.2)	54.7 (12.6)	43.2 (6.2)	34.4 (1.3)	53.2 (11.8)
Mean daily minimum °F (°C)	21.5 (−5.8)	24.0 (−4.4)	31.7 (−0.2)	41.2 (5.1)	51.8 (11.0)	61.1 (16.2)	64.7 (18.2)	62.7 (17.1)	54.8 (12.7)	43.5 (6.4)	33.5 (0.8)	26.9 (−2.8)	43.1 (6.2)
Mean minimum °F (°C)	1.6 (−16.9)	3.9 (−15.6)	15.0 (−9.4)	25.4 (−3.7)	35.5 (1.9)	48.3 (9.1)	52.0 (11.1)	50.4 (10.2)	42.3 (5.7)	28.3 (−2.1)	19.5 (−6.9)	10.6 (−11.9)	−0.8 (−18.2)
Record low °F (°C)	−12 (−24)	−9 (−23)	2 (−17)	16 (−9)	28 (−2)	40 (4)	41 (5)	40 (4)	31 (−1)	18 (−8)	11 (−12)	−7 (−22)	−12 (−24)
Average precipitation inches (mm)	2.86 (73)	2.32 (59)	3.40 (86)	3.93 (100)	4.17 (106)	4.08 (104)	4.22 (107)	3.37 (86)	3.22 (82)	3.07 (78)	2.69 (68)	2.85 (72)	40.18 (1,021)
Average precipitation days (≥ 0.01 in)	9.8	9.8	10.4	11.2	11.4	10.7	10.0	9.2	7.8	9.5	8.3	10.4	118.5
Source: NOAA (mean maxima/minima 2006–2020)

== Demographics ==
Historical population
Census	Pop.	Note	%±
1820	1,037		—
1830	1,530		47.5%
1840	3,272		113.9%
1850	3,483		6.4%
1860	4,308		23.7%
1870	4,725		9.7%
1880	6,803		44.0%
1890	7,555		11.1%
1900	8,991		19.0%
1910	13,093		45.6%
1920	14,706		12.3%
1930	18,716		27.3%
1940	21,940		17.2%
1950	24,180		10.2%
1960	29,916		23.7%
1970	32,911		10.0%
1980	34,925		6.1%
1990	34,507		−1.2%
2000	35,335		2.4%
2010	38,780		9.7%
2020	40,552		4.6%

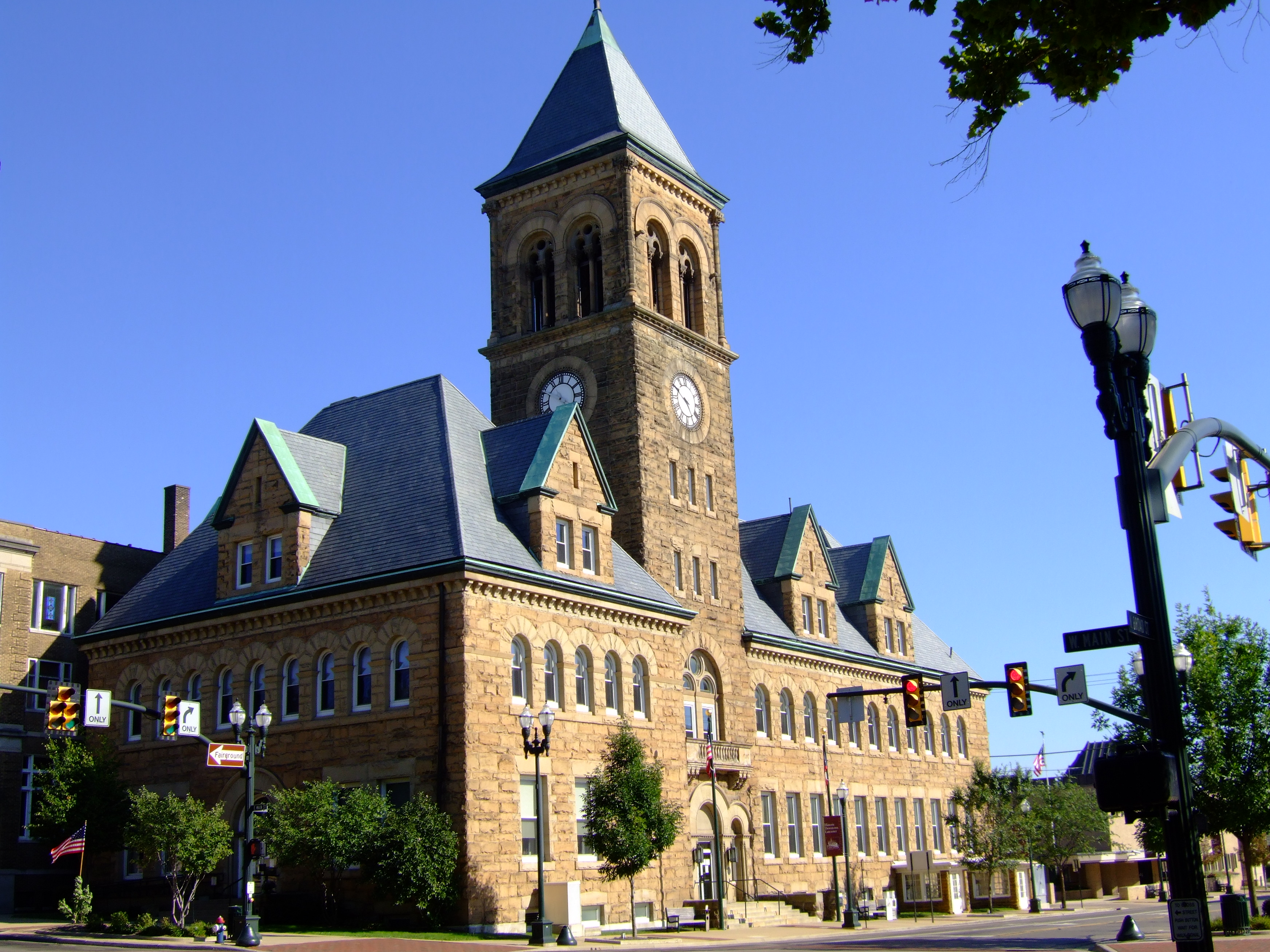
Lancaster City Hall

The city's median household income was $44,794 and median family income was $59,930. Males had a median income of $36,169 versus $24,549 for females. The city's per capita income was $25,230. About 12.0% of all families (4.4% of married-couple families), and 16.3% of the population were below the poverty line, including 22.0% of those under age 18 and 10.0% of those over 65.

=== 2020 census ===
As of the 2020 census, Lancaster had a population of 40,552 and a population density of 2,058.3 people per square mile (794.7 people/km^{2}). The 18,302 housing units had an average density of 879.6 per square mile (339.6/km^{2}).

Of the 16,988 households in Lancaster, 27.2% had children under the age of 18 living in them. Of all households, 40.0% were married-couple households, 19.2% were households with a male householder and no spouse or partner present, and 31.4% were households with a female householder and no spouse or partner present. About 33.0% of all households were made up of individuals and 15.3% had someone living alone who was 65 years of age or older.

There were 18,302 housing units, of which 7.2% were vacant. The homeowner vacancy rate was 1.4% and the rental vacancy rate was 6.9%.

99.4% of residents lived in urban areas, while 0.6% lived in rural areas.

The median age was 39.8 years, with 22.3% of residents under the age of 18 and 19.7% of residents aged 65 or older. For every 100 females, there were 92.9 males, and for every 100 females age 18 and over there were 89.7 males age 18 and over.

Racial composition as of the 2020 census
Race	Number	Percent
White	36,991	91.2%
Black or African American	817	2.0%
American Indian and Alaska Native	103	0.3%
Asian	245	0.6%
Native Hawaiian and Other Pacific Islander	5	0.0%
Some other race	305	0.8%
Two or more races	2,086	5.1%
Hispanic or Latino (of any race)	785	1.9%

=== 2010 census ===
As of the census of 2010, 38,780 people, 16,048 households, and 9,937 families resided in the city. The population density was 1,955.9 people per square mile (755.2 people/km^{2}). The 17,685 housing units had an average density of 879.6 per square mile (339.6/km^{2}). The racial makeup of the city was 95.9% White, 1.0% African American, 0.5% Asian, 0.30% Native American, 0.6% from other races, and 1.7% from two or more races. Hispanics or Latinos of any race were 1.6% of the population.

Of the 16,048 households, 27.8% had children under 18 living with them, 42.4% were married couples living together, 14.2% had a female householder with no husband present, and 38.1% were not families. About 31.7% of all households were made up of individuals, and 13.8% had someone living alone who was 65 years of age or older. The average household size was 2.36, and the average family size was 2.95.

In the city, the age distribution was 24% under the age of 18 and 15.7% who were 65 or older. The median age was 37.5 years. For every 100 females, there were 92.3 males. For every 100 females age 18 and over, there were 88.6 males.

== Economy ==
=== Top employers ===
According to the city's 2021 Comprehensive Annual Financial Report, Lancaster's top employers are:

#	Employer	No. of employees
1	Fairfield Medical Center	2,314
2	Anchor Hocking	1,782
3	Fairfield County	1,387
4	Lancaster City Schools	1,121
5	Kroger	936
6	MAGNA	621
7	City of Lancaster	496
8	SRI Ohio Inc	456
9	Daily Services	432
10	Group Management Services	412

== Arts and culture ==
Lancaster is home to the Fairfield County Fair, a weeklong fair and the last (88th) county fair in Ohio each year, always in the second week of October. It features a variety of attractions, including truck, tractor, and horse pulls, demolition derbies, concerts, bands, and horse races. The Fairfield County Fair also includes food, animals, exhibits, games, and rides for people of all ages.

=== AHA! A Hands-on Adventure ===
AHA! is a children's museum founded in 2006. Its mission is to provide a hands-on, interactive, playful, and educational environment that invites curiosity, allows exploration, encourages participation, and celebrates the child-like wonder in everyone.

=== Georgian Museum ===
Originally built in 1832 for the Maccracken Family, this Federal-style home is constructed predominantly of brick and local limestone. Converted into a museum, it is now furnished as it would have been in the 1830s with some original pieces and numerous early Fairfield County items. Located in one of Lancaster's three national historic districts, the structure mixes elements of American, Georgian, and Regency architecture.

=== The Decorative Arts Center of Ohio ===
The Decorative Arts Center of Ohio is a nonprofit museum whose mission is to foster knowledge and appreciation of the decorative arts, celebrate the architecture and heritage of the Reese-Peters House, and enhance historic Lancaster's vitality and integrity. It provides exhibitions, public programs, art classes, and workshops for all ages, and a focus for research and communication about the decorative arts of Ohio.

=== Ohio Glass Museum ===
Opened in 2002, the Ohio Glass Museum is in historic downtown Lancaster and dedicated to recording the history of the glass industry, which for over 100 years has been one of the mainstays of Fairfield County's economy.

=== Sherman House ===
Lancaster was the birthplace of Civil War General William Tecumseh Sherman and his brother, Senator John Sherman. The house where they were born, built in 1811, has been converted into a museum, housing articles related to General Sherman's life and Civil War artifacts. The Sherman family expanded the frame house in 1816 and again, with an additional brick front, in 1870.

=== Robert K Fox Family YMCA Swim Team ===
The Robert K Fox Family YMCA Swim Team (LYST, or Lancaster YMCA Swim Team), is a competitive, year-round swim team coached by Axel Birnbrich and a team of experienced assistant coaches. Birnbirch is in his 39th year of coaching and his second year at LYST. The team has swimmers from ages 5–18 and around 130 members per year. They regularly attend the YMCA Short Course and Long Course national meets. They are also a USA Swimming team, attending many USA meets per season.

=== Shopping ===
The city's main shopping district is centered around River Valley Mall, or downtown Lancaster.

== Education ==
Lancaster City School District operates Lancaster High School. Lancaster has a public library, a branch of the Fairfield County District Library. Additionally, Ohio University-Lancaster is a branch campus of Ohio University that operates in the area.

== Media ==
Lancaster has a daily newspaper, the Lancaster Eagle-Gazette.

Lancaster has a monthly magazine, the Lancaster Living Magazine, published by Cher Jaurigue.

== Infrastructure ==
=== Transportation ===
The Fairfield County Airport is located three nautical miles (3.5 mi; 5.6 km) northwest of Lancaster's central business district.

== Notable people ==
Lancaster is the birthplace and/or hometown of:

- Allan Anderson, Major League Baseball pitcher, American League ERA leader 1988
- Mark Baltz, NFL official, 1989–2013
- Jim Brideweser, Major League Baseball player
- Bobby Carpenter, NFL player Dallas Cowboys, Miami Dolphins, Detroit Lions, New England Patriots
- Rob Carpenter, NFL player, New York Giants, Houston Oilers
- Gene Cole, 1952 Olympic silver medalist – 4 x 400 metre relay
- Jim Cordle, NFL player, New York Giants
- Hugh Boyle Ewing, Union Army Major General
- Thomas Ewing, first Secretary of the Interior, appointed by President Zachary Taylor
- Thomas Ewing, Jr., Union Army brigadier general, defender of Abraham Lincoln assassination conspirators
- Malcolm Forbes, publisher of Forbes magazine who ran a local Lancaster newspaper in 1941
- Bill Glassford, football player and coach
- David Graf, actor, is best known as Sgt. Eugene Tackleberry in the Police Academy series of films.
- Robert G. Heft, designer of the current 50-star flag of the United States adopted by the Congress in 1960
- Edward Gerard Hettinger, auxiliary bishop of the Roman Catholic Diocese of Columbus
- James A. Hill, retired U.S. Air Force general and former vice chief of staff of the Air Force
- George King Hunter, U.S. Army brigadier general, born in Lancaster
- James Hyde Actor, Model and Dancer, known for his role as Sam Bennett on the soap opera Passions
- Rex Kern, football quarterback, Ohio State Buckeyes football 1968 national championship team
- Brannon Kidder, professional middle-distance runner
- Augustus Roy Knabenshue, American aeronautical engineer and aviator, manager of Wright Exhibition Team
- James A. Lantz, lawyer and Ohio state legislator
- Clarence E. Miller, a Republican congressman from Ohio, serving January 3, 1967 to January 3, 1993
- Marc Wolfgang Miller, author, explorer, known for his cryptozoology expeditions
- Mary Murphy, ballroom dance champion and accredited dance judge
- Joe Ogilvie, PGA golfer
- Richard F. Outcault, cartoonist and creator of Yellow Kid and Buster Brown
- Mike Parobeck,comics artist best known for his work on the Batman Adventures and El Diablo comic books.
- Jacob Parrott, first recipient of the Medal of Honor
- Cora Rigby, first woman at a major paper to head a Washington news bureau
- John Sherman, U.S. senator, Secretary of State and Secretary of the Treasury
- William Tecumseh Sherman, Union Army and U.S. Army general and General of the Army of the United States
- Henry Stanbery, Attorney General, defender of President Andrew Johnson at his impeachment trial
- Rebecca Harrell Tickell, actress, best known as Jessica Riggs in the 1989 film Prancer
- Patricia A. Weitsman, international relations scholar
