= Jim Cordle =

American football player and coach (born 1987)

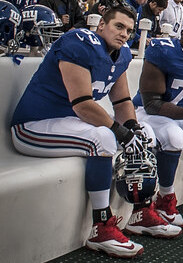
- Cordle with the New York Giants in 2013

Ashland Eagles
- Title: Associate head coach / Offensive line coach

Personal information
- Born: August 22, 1987 (age 39); Lancaster, Ohio, U.S.
- Listed height: 6 ft 4 in (1.93 m)
- Listed weight: 297 lb (135 kg)

Career information
- Position: Center (No. 63)
- High school: Lancaster (Lancaster, Ohio)
- College: Ohio State (2005–2009)
- NFL draft: 2011: undrafted

Career history

Playing
- New York Giants (2010–2013)

Coaching
- Ohio State (GA) (2015–2016); Urbana (OL) (2017); Urbana (OC/OL) (2018–2019); LIU (OC/OL) (2020–2021); Ohio Northern (OC/OL) (2022); Ashland (AHC/OL) (2023–present)

Awards and highlights
- Super Bowl champion (XLVI)

Career NFL statistics
- Games played: 36
- Games started: 7
- Stats at Pro Football Reference

Jim Cordle (born August 22, 1987) is an American former professional football player who was a center in the National Football League (NFL). He was signed by the New York Giants as an undrafted free agent in 2011. He was part of the Giants team that won Super Bowl XLVI over the New England Patriots. He played college football for the Ohio State Buckeyes. Cordle was previously the offensive line coach and offensive coordinator at Long Island University as well as Ohio Northern University. He is currently assistant head coach and offensive line coach at Ashland University.
