= Monsters Inside: The 24 Faces of Billy Milligan =

2021 Netflix docuseries

- Genre: Documentary
- Starring: Bob Ruth; Sheila Porter
- Opening theme: "Them" by The Limiñanas and David Menke
- Country of origin: United States
- Original language: English (Note: With some interviews in French.)
- No. of seasons: 1
- No. of episodes: 4

Production
- Running time: 59–63 minutes

Original release
- Network: Netflix
- Release: September 22, 2021

Monsters Inside: The 24 Faces of Billy Milligan is a 2021 docuseries about Billy Milligan, released on Netflix on September 22, 2021. It stars Kathy Preston, Bob Ruth and Sheila Porter.

== Synopsis ==
Billy Milligan was arrested in 1977 for a series of robberies, kidnappings, and rapes of three women on the Ohio State University campus. Despite evidence suggesting he had committed the crimes, Milligan had no memories of the assaults, appearing to exhibit continually changing personality traits. This resulted in a team of psychiatrists diagnosing him as having dissociative identity disorder. His lawyers pleaded insanity, claiming two of his initial 10 personalities committed the crimes without Milligan's knowledge. Milligan was acquitted but spent the next decade in mental hospitals, where he was diagnosed with an additional 14 personalities. He was released in 1988, then discharged from the Ohio mental health system and Ohio courts in 1991. His life outside the system of trying to lead a normal life is also discussed.

== Cast ==
- Kathy Preston
- Bob Ruth
- Sheila Porter
- Frank W. Putnam
- Allen J. Frances
- Bobby Lacer
- Jim Morrison
- Bernard Yavitch
- Sharon Lansing
- Cornelia B. Wilbur
- Jack Ward
- Pam Flynn
- Jamie Schmerbeck
- Ron O'Brien
- George Harding
- Jim Murray
- David Malawista
- Terry Sherman
- Rob Baumgardt
- Mikkel Borch-Jacobsen
- Beverly Lynn
- Ronald Litvak
- Colin Ross
- Marlene Kocan
- Robert Booker

== Episodes ==
No.	Title	Original release date
1	"The Campus Rapist"	September 22, 2021
2	"The Monsters Inside Me"	September 22, 2021
3	"The Golden Age"	September 22, 2021
4	"The Escape"	September 22, 2021
