= Marc Wolfgang Miller =

American doctor of neuropsychology, explorer and author

Marc Edward Wolfgang Miller (born in Lancaster, Ohio) is an American doctor of neuropsychology, explorer, and writer. Miller was chief of neuropsychology at Good Samaritan Hospital for 25 years and is currently in private practice. He has led over 30 expeditions around the world in search of rare or extinct animals with his friend Bill Cacciolfi. Jack Hanna once said that "Marc is an adventurer in the true sense of the word and among the great explorers of our times."

== Explorations and other work ==
Miller is a Fellow member of the famed Explorers Club in New York City which is a "who's who" of extreme adventurers. His trips have resulted in many scientific findings which have helped form evidence for extinct animals. In 2005, the Walt Disney Company consulted with Miller on a new attraction called Expedition Everest and used photographs he took while on his journey in the Himalayas researching the Yeti. Dr. Miller is also the author of three books about his adventures in cryptozoology such as Chasing Legends and The Legend Continues, which are currently out of print. In 2011, Miller published his third book, Legends in Cryptozoology, about his adventures over the past 30 years. His most recent expedition was to a remote part of India searching for the buru and the Sacred Brass Plates. Marc is a lecturer and has made appearances on television and radio. He has written numerous magazine articles and scientific journals. He has travelled with the International Medical Corps to war torn countries. He is a founding member of Hospice Fairhope and current officer. Marc was also a founding member of A Special Wish Foundation and past president.

== Books ==
- Chasing Legends: An Adventurer's Diary, Adventures Unlimited Press (1990) ISBN 0-932813-08-9
- The Legends Continue: Adventures in Cryptozoology, Adventures Unlimited Press (1998). No ISBN.
- Legends in Cryptozoology, 2011, Published by Nordenfjord World University - Denmark

== Sources ==
- Conversation for Exploration - Cryptozoology
- The Yeti Hand
- Dr. Millers Himalayan Yeti Expedition
