= Daniel Keyes =

American author (1927–2014)

- Daniel Keyes
- Born: August 9, 1927; New York City, U.S.
- Died: June 15, 2014 (aged 86); Boca Raton, Florida, U.S.
- Education: New York University; Brooklyn College
- Occupation: Fiction writer
- Spouse: Aurea Georgina Vazquez
- Writing career
- Period: 1952–2014
- Genre: Science fiction
- Notable works: Flowers for Algernon (1959); The Minds of Billy Milligan (1981)
- Notable awards: Hugo Award (1960); Nebula Award (1966); Kurd Lasswitz Award (1986); Seiun Award (1993)
- Website: www.danielkeyesauthor.com

Daniel Keyes (August 9, 1927 – June 15, 2014) was an American writer best known as the author of the novel Flowers for Algernon. Keyes was given the Author Emeritus honor by the Science Fiction and Fantasy Writers of America in 2000.

== Biography ==
=== Early life and career ===
Keyes was born in New York City. His family was Jewish. He attended New York University briefly before joining the United States Maritime Service at 17, working as a ship's purser on oil tankers. Afterward he returned to New York and in 1950 received a bachelor's degree in psychology from Brooklyn College.

A month after graduation, Keyes joined publisher Martin Goodman's magazine company, Magazine Management. He eventually became an editor of their pulp magazine Marvel Science Stories (cover-dated Nov. 1950 – May 1952) after editor Robert O. Erisman, and began writing for the company's comic-book lines Atlas Comics, the 1950s precursors of Marvel Comics. After Goodman ceased publishing pulps in favor of paperback books and men's adventure magazines, Keyes became an associate editor of Atlas under editor-in-chief and art director Stan Lee. Circa 1952, Keyes was one of several staff writers, officially titled editors, who wrote for such horror and science fiction comics as Journey into Unknown Worlds, for which Keyes wrote two stories with artist Basil Wolverton.

As Keyes recalled, Goodman offered him a job under Lee after Marvel Science Stories ceased publication:

Since my $17.25-a-month rent was almost due, I accepted what I considered a detour on my journey toward a literary career. Stan Lee ... let his editors deal with the scriptwriters, cartoonists, and lettering crew. Writers turned in plot synopses, Stan read them, and as a matter of course, would accept one or two from each of the regulars he referred to as his "stable." As one of his front men, I would pass along comments and criticism. ... Because of my experience editing Marvel and because I'd sold a few science fiction stories by then, Stan allowed me to specialize in the horror, fantasy, suspense, and science fiction comic books. Naturally, I began submitting story ideas, getting freelance assignment, and supplementing my salary by writing scripts on my own time.

One story idea Keyes wrote but did not submit to Lee was called "Brainstorm", the paragraph-long synopsis that would evolve into Flowers for Algernon. It begins: "The first guy in the test to raise the I.Q. from a low normal 90 to genius level ... He goes through the experience and then is thrown back to what was." Keyes recalled, "something told me it should be more than a comic book script."

From 1955 to 1956, Keyes wrote for EC Comics, including its titles Psychoanalysis, Shock Illustrated, and Confessions Illustrated, under both his own name and the pseudonyms Kris Daniels and A.D. Locke.

=== Flowers for Algernon ===
The short story and subsequent novel, Flowers for Algernon, is written as progress reports of a mentally disabled man, Charlie, who undergoes experimental surgery and briefly becomes a genius before the effects tragically wear off. The story was initially published in the April 1959 issue of The Magazine of Fantasy & Science Fiction and the expanded novel in 1966. The novel has been adapted several times for other media, most prominently as the 1968 film Charly, starring Cliff Robertson (who won an Academy Award for Best Actor) and Claire Bloom. Keyes also won the Hugo Award in 1959 and the Nebula Award in 1966 for the story.

The inspiration for Flowers for Algernon came from Keyes's experiences as a teacher. When he was teaching at a high school, he taught both mentally gifted and challenged students. One particular experience with a boy in his mentally challenged class sparked the inspiration to begin writing Flowers for Algernon. He was wondering what would happen if it was possible for a person to gain intelligence.

=== Later career ===
Keyes taught creative writing at Wayne State University, and in 1966 he became an English and creative writing professor at Ohio University, in Athens, Ohio, where he was honored as a professor emeritus in 2000.

=== Death ===
Keyes died at his home in Boca Raton on June 15, 2014, due to complications from pneumonia. His wife Aurea Georgina Vazquez, whom he married in 1952, had died on May 14, 2013. They had two daughters.

== Awards ==
=== Won ===
- 1960: Hugo Award for the story "Flowers for Algernon"
- 1966: Nebula Award for the novel Flowers for Algernon
- 1986: Kurd Lasswitz Award for The Minds of Billy Milligan
- 1993: Seiun Award (Non-Fiction of the Year) for The Minds of Billy Milligan
- 2000: Author Emeritus Award from Science Fiction and Fantasy Writers of America

=== Nominated ===
- 1967: Hugo Award for the novel Flowers for Algernon
- 1982: Edgar Award for Best Fact Crime for The Minds of Billy Milligan
- 1987: Edgar Award for the American Association of Mystery Writers for Unveiling Claudia
- 2001: Locus Award for Best Non-fiction for Algernon, Charlie and I: A Writer's Journey

== Bibliography ==
=== Novels ===
- Flowers for Algernon (novel, 1966) adapted for cinema as Charly, 1968, and as Flowers for Algernon, 2000
- The Touch (1968; re-edited and published as The Contaminated Man, 1977)
- The Fifth Sally (1980)
- Until Death (1998)
- The Asylum Prophecies (2009)

=== Short fiction ===
| Title | Year | First published | Notes |
|---|---|---|---|
| "Precedent" | 1952 | Marvel Science Fiction, Vol. 3, No. 6 | |
| "Robot Unwanted" | 1952 | Other Worlds, #19 | |
| "Something Borrowed" | 1952 | Fantastic Story, Vol. 4, #1 | |
| "The Trouble With Elmo" | 1958 | Galaxy, XVI, 4 | |
| "Flowers for Algernon" | 1959 | Keyes, Daniel (April 1959). "Flowers for Algernon". F&SF. 16 (4). | Expanded as a novel, 1966. |
| "Crazy Maro" | 1960 | The Magazine of Fantasy & Science Fiction, Vol. 18, 4 | Paired with the essay "What Do Characters Cost?" |
| "The Quality of Mercy" | 1960 | IF, Vol. X, 5 | |
| "A Jury of its Peers" | 1963 | Worlds of Tomorrow, Vol. 1, No. 3 | |
| "Spellbinder" | 1967 | North American Review, Vol. 4 No. 4 | |
| "Mama's Girl" | 1993 | Daniel Keyes Collected Stories | |

==== Collections ====
- Daniel Keyes Collected Stories (Kayakawa, 1993)
- Daniel Keyes Reader (Hayakawa, 1994)

=== Non-fiction ===
- The Minds of Billy Milligan (1981)
- Unveiling Claudia (1986)
- The Milligan Wars: A True-Story Sequel (Hayakawa, 1994)
- Algernon, Charlie and I: A Writer's Journey (Challcrest Press, 2000)
