= List of Ohio State Buckeyes in the NFL draft =

As of 2026, the Ohio State Buckeyes have the most first-round selections in the history of the NFL draft with 99. They are third behind USC and Notre Dame for overall draft picks with 514 (as of 2026). In the 2015 draft, the defending national champion Buckeyes had no players selected in the first round (no eligible underclassmen declared), the first time a championship team had gone without first round picks since the 2003 draft when the 2002 National Champion Buckeyes did the same. 2004 and 2025 are tied with the most Buckeyes selected in a single NFL draft with 14. 1998 is the only year, since the draft's inception in 1936, in which no Buckeye has been selected. The following are the lists of Ohio State players selected in the NFL draft and NFL supplemental drafts since 1936.

1936 NFL draft selections
Round	Pick #	Team	Player	Position
2	15	Chicago Cardinals	Gomer Jones	C
8	72	New York Giants	Dick Heekin	Back

1937 NFL draft selections
Round	Pick #	Team	Player	Position
2	17	Detroit Lions	Charley Hamrick	T
5	50	Cleveland Rams	Inwood Smith	T
6	59	Green Bay Packers	Merle Wendt	T

1938 NFL draft selections
Round	Pick #	Team	Player	Position
1	2	Philadelphia Eagles	Jim McDonald	HB\FB
5	40	Chicago Bears	Gustave "Gust" Zarnas	OG
8	66	Detroit Lions	Dick Nardi	HB
9	71	Cleveland Rams	Charles Ream	End
10	86	Detroit Lions	Ralph Wolf	C

1939 NFL draft selections
Round	Pick #	Team	Player	Position
7	55	Brooklyn Dodgers	Alex Schoenbaum	T
12	109	Brooklyn Dodgers	Carl Kaplanoff	T
14	124	Philadelphia Eagles	Joe Aleskus	T

1940 NFL draft selections
Round	Pick #	Team	Player	Position
5	39	Green Bay Packers	Esco Sarkkinen	End
8	64	Brooklyn Dodgers	Frank Zadworney	Back
17	158	Washington Redskins	Steve Andrako	C

1941 NFL draft selections
Round	Pick #	Team	Player	Position
1	9	Chicago Bears	Don Scott	QB
10	89	Brooklyn Dodgers	Jim Langhurst	Back
15	132	Chicago Cardinals	Claude White	C
20	186	Green Bay Packers	Jimmy Strausbaugh	Back

1942 NFL draft selections
Round	Pick #	Team	Player	Position
12	110	Chicago Bears	Jim Daniell	OT\DT
16	149	Green Bay Packers	Tom Kinkade	Back
17	155	Detroit Lions	Dick Fisher	Back
18	162	Cleveland Rams	Jack Graf	QB\FB

1943 NFL draft selections
Round	Pick #	Team	Player	Position
6	45	Cleveland Rams	Les Horvath	QB
12	105	Cleveland Rams	Bill Vickroy	C
13	116	New York Giants	Don McCafferty	End

1944 NFL draft selections
Round	Pick #	Team	Player	Position
9	80	Philadelphia Eagles	Paul Sarringhaus	Back
10	97	Cleveland Rams	Bob Shaw	TE
11	106	Chicago Bears	Lin Houston	OG
16	154	Chicago Cardinals	Charley Csuri	T

1945 NFL draft selections
Round	Pick #	Team	Player	Position
2	12	Pittsburgh Steelers	Jack Dugger	End
3	26	New York Giants	Gordon Appleby	C
6	49	Detroit Lions	Gene Fekete	FB
13	131	Green Bay Packers	Bill Hackett	OG
17	174	New York Giants	Bob Jabbusch	OG
25	259	Washington Redskins	Cecil "Cy" Souders	End
31	324	Green Bay Packers	John Priday	Back

1946 NFL draft selections
Round	Pick #	Team	Player	Position
3	22	Detroit Lions	Russ Thomas	T
8	70	L.A. Rams	Joe Whisler	Back
10	87	Detroit Lions	Thorton Dixon	T
11	95	New York Giants	Warren Amling	OT
11	100	L.A. Rams	Tom Phillips	Back
30	288	Philadelphia Eagles	George Slusser	Back

1947 NFL draft selections
Round	Pick #	Team	Player	Position
2	12	Detroit Lions	Russ Thomas	T
12	103	L.A. Rams	Dante Lavelli	End
12	105	Chicago Bears	Tony Adamle	C
17	146	Detroit Lions	Tommy James	DHB
30	283	L.A. Rams	Hal Dean	OG

1948 NFL draft selections
Round	Pick #	Team	Player	Position
6	42	Philadelphia Eagles	Howard Duncan	C
6	44	Chicago Bears	Bob Brugge	Back
10	83	Chicago Bears	Dick Flanagan	C
14	122	Chicago Bears	Ollie Cline	FB
16	137	Detroit Lions	Dave Templeton	OG

1949 NFL draft selections
Round	Pick #	Team	Player	Position
6	59	Chicago Bears	Jerry Krall	Back
21	202	Detroit Lions	Jack Lininger	C

1950 NFL draft selections
Round	Pick #	Team	Player	Position
1	10	Chicago Bears	Fred "Curly" Morrison	RB
2	21	Chicago Bears	Jack Jennings	OT
8	105	Philadelphia Eagles	Dick O'Hanlon	T
11	135	Detroit Lions	Jack Wilson	T
14	181	L.A. Rams	Bill Trautwein	T
22	287	Philadelphia Eagles	Jim Hague	End
23	290	Green Bay Packers	George Mattey	OG

1951 NFL draft selections
Round	Pick #	Team	Player	Position
7	80	Detroit Lions	Bob Momsen	T
26	305	Green Bay Packers	Bill Miller	T

1952 NFL draft selections
Round	Pick #	Team	Player	Position
3	36	Cleveland Browns	Joe Campanella	LB
7	79	Washington Redskins	Vic Janowicz	RB
9	106	Detroit Lions	Sherman "Sonny" Gandee	DE
11	132	Cleveland Browns	Dick Logan	OG
14	168	Cleveland Browns	Steve Ruzich	OG
15	175	Washington Redskins	Julius Wittman	DT
27	318	Pittsburgh Steelers	Dick "Skippy" Doyle	Back
29	348	Cleveland Browns	Walt Klevay	Back

1953 NFL draft selections
Round	Pick #	Team	Player	Position
3	35	Cleveland Browns	Fred Bruney	DB
6	63	Chicago Cardinals	Tony Curcillo	DB
11	130	New York Giants	Jim Ruehl	C
11	131	Cleveland Browns	Dick Hilinski	DT
16	187	Green Bay Packers	John Hlay	FB

1954 NFL draft selections
Round	Pick #	Team	Player	Position
6	65	New York Giants	George Jacoby	T
13	147	Green Bay Packers	Mike Takacs	OG
22	256	Baltimore Colts	Bob Meyer	T
25	296	Washington Redskins	George Russo	DB

1955 NFL draft selections
Round	Pick #	Team	Player	Position
2	23	Chicago Bears	Bobby Watkins	HB
4	46	Philadelphia Eagles	Dean Dugger	End
7	74	Chicago Cardinals	Dave Leggett	QB
13	153	Philadelphia Eagles	Jerry Krisher	C
13	157	Cleveland Browns	John Borton	QB
15	170	Chicago Cardinals	Dick Brubaker	End
28	328	Baltimore Colts	Bob Meyer	T
28	330	Pittsburgh Steelers	Dave Williams	OG

1956 NFL draft selections
Round	Pick #	Team	Player	Position
1	3	Detroit Lions	Howard "Hopalong" Cassady	HB
4	41	Washington Redskins	Fran Machinsky	DT
9	106	Chicago Bears	Ken Vargo	C
22	261	New York Giants	Jerry Harkrader	Back

1957 NFL draft selections
Round	Pick #	Team	Player	Position
1	8	Baltimore Colts	Jim Parker	OG
2	16	Pittsburgh Steelers	Bill Michael	DT
11	124	Green Bay Packers	Jim Roseboro	Back
11	125	Cleveland Browns	Bill Cummings	DT
13	146	Philadelphia Eagles	Hubert Bobo	LB
16	185	Baltimore Colts	Joe Cannavino	RB
18	212	San Francisco 49ers	Dick Guy	OG
22	257	Pittsburgh Steelers	Aurelius Thomas	OG
27	319	Cleveland Browns	Andy Okulovich	Back
27	320	San Francisco 49ers	Don Vivic	Back
30	351	L.A. Rams	Lee Williams	Back

1958 NFL draft selections
Round	Pick #	Team	Player	Position
7	80	L.A. Rams	Bill Jobko	OG
8	94	New York Giants	Don Sutherin	DB
11	132	Cleveland Browns	Russ Bowermaster	End

1959 NFL draft selections
Round	Pick #	Team	Player	Position
1	7	Chicago Bears	Don Clark	RB
1	8	San Francisco 49ers	Dan James	C
2	23	Cleveland Browns	Dick Schafrath	OG
5	58	Cleveland Browns	Dick LeBeau	DB
20	231	Chicago Cardinals	Jerry Lee Murphy	T
23	275	New York Giants	Frank Kremblas	QB
25	298	Cleveland Browns	Ernie Spycholski	T
26	307	Pittsburgh Steelers	John Scott	T

1960 NFL draft selections
Round	Pick #	Team	Player	Position
1	8	Cleveland Browns	Jim Houston	DE
4	44	Cleveland Browns	Jim Marshall	DE
8	91	Cleveland Browns	Bob White	FB

1961 NFL draft selections
Round	Pick #	Team	Player	Position
1	7	Baltimore Colts	Tom Matte	RB
13	179	New York Giants	Jerry Fields	RB
14	188	Chicago Bears	Jim Tyrer	OT
15	200	L.A. Rams	Ernie Wright	OT
18	241	Washington Redskins	George Tolford	OT
20	269	Washington Redskins	Mike Ingram	OG

1962 NFL draft selections
Round	Pick #	Team	Player	Position
1	5	Pittsburgh Steelers	Bob Ferguson	RB
1	31	Boston Patriots	Mike Ingram	OG
3	34	St. Louis Cardinals	Chuck Bryant	TE
6	81	Cleveland Browns	Sam Tidmore	DE
7	95	Cleveland Browns	John Havlicek	WR
20	273	Chicago Bears	Jack Roberts	DT

1963 NFL draft selections
Round	Pick #	Team	Player	Position
1	5	Baltimore Colts	Bob Vogel	OT
1	12	Detroit Lions	Daryl Sanders	OT
5	66	San Francisco 49ers	Gary Moeller	OG
7	91	Washington Redskins	Dave Francis	RB
13	177	Cleveland Browns	Dave Katterhenrich	RB

1964 NFL draft selections
Round	Pick #	Team	Player	Position
1	11	Cleveland Browns	Paul Warfield	HB
4	49	New York Jets	Matt Snell	RB
10	138	Cleveland Browns	Dick Van Raaphorst	K
14	191	Pittsburgh Steelers	Tom Jenkins	OG

1965 NFL draft selections
Round	Pick #	Team	Player	Position
1	8	Buffalo Bills	Jim Davidson	T
3	32	Cleveland Browns	Bo Scott	RB
19	265	Cleveland Browns	Ed Orazen	OG

1966 NFL draft selections
Round	Pick #	Team	Player	Position
3	38	Washington Redskins	Tom Barrington	RB
4	55	Detroit Lions	Doug Van Horn	OG
17	249	Philadelphia Eagles	Ike Kelly	LB

1967 NFL draft selections
Round	Pick #	Team	Player	Position
3	58	Denver Broncos	Mike Current	OT
7	179	Baltimore Colts	Bob Rein	WR
12	300	Washington Redskins	Ron Sepic	WR

1968 NFL draft selections
Round	Pick #	Team	Player	Position
3	81	Green Bay Packers	Dick Himes	OT

1969 NFL draft selections
Round	Pick #	Team	Player	Position
1	14	Chicago Bears	Rufus Mayes	OT
1	26	New York Jets	Dave Foley	OT
10	239	Cincinnati Bengals	Steve Howell	TE

1970 NFL draft selections
Round	Pick #	Team	Player	Position
2	38	St. Louis Cardinals	Chuck Hutchison	OG
7	162	L.A. Rams	Ted Provost	DB
9	218	New Orleans Saints	Jim Otis	RB
10	241	Cincinnati Bengals	Nick Roman	LB

1971 NFL draft selections
Round	Pick #	Team	Player	Position
1	9	Green Bay Packers	John Brockington	RB
1	19	Oakland Raiders	Jack Tatum	DB
1	23	San Francisco 49ers	William Tim Anderson	DB
1	24	Minnesota Vikings	Leo Hayden	RB
2	29	Buffalo Bills	Jan White	TE
5	124	Green Bay Packers	Jim Stillwagon	LB
7	165	Denver Broncos	Doug Adams	LB
8	191	Kansas City Chiefs	Mike Sensibaugh	DB
8	196	Cleveland Browns	Larry Zelina	RB
10	250	Kansas City Chiefs	Bruce Jankowski	WR
10	260	Baltimore Colts	Rex Kern	QB
15	376	Chicago Bears	Ron Maciejowski	QB
16	405	Cincinnati Bengals	Mark Debevc	LB

1972 NFL draft selections
Round	Pick #	Team	Player	Position
5	106	Cincinnati Bengals	Tom Deleone	C
9	225	L.A. Rams	Harry Howard	DB
12	312	Dallas Cowboys	Jimmy Harris	WR
13	316	St. Louis Cardinals	Tom Campana	DB
16	409	Cleveland Browns	Richard Wakefield	WR
17	438	Baltimore Colts	Stan White	LB

1973 NFL draft selections
Round	Pick #	Team	Player	Position
8	194	New York Jets	Rick Seifert	DB
8	198	New York Giants	George Hasenohrl	DT
8	203	Detroit Lions	John Bledsoe	RB
9	218	Washington Redskins	Rich Galbos	RB
17	435	Detroit Lions	Earl Belgrave	T

1974 NFL draft selections
Round	Pick #	Team	Player	Position
1	3	New York Giants	John Hicks	OG
1	13	New Orleans Saints	Rick Middleton	LB
1	14	Denver Broncos	Randy Gradishar	LB
4	93	Oakland Raiders	Morris Bradshaw	WR
8	203	Buffalo Bills	Greg Hare	QB
9	224	Cleveland Browns	Dan Scott	OG
10	243	Pittsburgh Steelers	Jim Kregel	OG
12	304	Atlanta Falcons	Vic Koegel	LB

1975 NFL draft selections
Round	Pick #	Team	Player	Position
1	12	New Orleans Saints	Kurt Schumacher	OT
1	20	L.A. Rams	Doug France	OT
1	24	Oakland Raiders	Neal Colzie	DB
3	66	New England Patriots	Pete Cusick	DT
4	88	Green Bay Packers	Steve Luke	DB
4	89	Minnesota Vikings	Harold "Champ" Henson	RB
4	100	Miami Dolphins	Bruce Elia	LB
5	119	Cleveland Browns	Jim Cope	LB
11	261	Baltimore Colts	Dave Hazel	WR
11	275	Detroit Lions	Steve Myers	OG
12	291	Chicago Bears	Doug Plank	DB
14	354	Philadelphia Eagles	Larry O'Rourke	DT
17	430	New York Jets	Mike Bartoszek	TE

1976 NFL draft selections
Round	Pick #	Team	Player	Position
1	21	New England Patriots	Tim Fox	S
1	24	Cincinnati Bengals	Archie Griffin	RB
3	66	Chicago Bears	Brian Baschnagel	WR
4	118	Minnesota Vikings	Leonard Willis	WR
7	205	Cincinnati Bengals	Ken Kuhn	LB
8	213	New Orleans Saints	Craig Cassady	DB
10	287	Cincinnati Bengals	Tom Claban	K
11	318	Dallas Cowboys	Cornelius Greene	QB
13	375	Pittsburgh Steelers	Larry Cain	TE
16	441	Atlanta Falcons	Pat Curto	LB
17	482	Cincinnati Bengals	Scott Dannelley	OG

1977 NFL draft selections
Round	Pick #	Team	Player	Position
1	23	L.A. Rams	Bob Brudzinski	LB
2	46	Cleveland Browns	Tom Skladany	P
2	49	Cincinnati Bengals	Pete Johnson	RB
8	210	New York Jets	Ed Thompson	LB
9	238	Chicago Bears	Nick Buonamici	DT

1978 NFL draft selections
Round	Pick #	Team	Player	Position
1	4	New York Jets	Chris Ward	OT
2	35	Cincinnati Bengals	Ray Griffin	DB
7	185	Chicago Bears	Herman Jones	WR
7	191	Baltimore Colts	Jeff Logan	RB
8	209	Atlanta Falcons	David Atkins	LB
10	252	Tampa Bay Buccaneers	Aaron Brown	LB

1979 NFL draft selections
Round	Pick #	Team	Player	Position
1	1	Buffalo Bills	Tom Cousineau	LB
5	136	Dallas Cowboys	Ron Springs	RB
6	150	Baltimore Colts	Jim Moore	OT
9	229	Kansas City Chiefs	Joe Robinson	OT

1980 NFL draft selections
Round	Pick #	Team	Player	Position
4	91	Atlanta Falcons	Jim Laughlin	LB
6	156	Chicago Bears	Mike Guess	DB
10	277	Pittsburgh Steelers	Ken Fritz	OG

1981 NFL draft selections
Round	Pick #	Team	Player	Position
2	53	Dallas Cowboys	Doug Donley	WR
4	86	New York Jets	Al Washington	LB
4	95	Chicago Bears	Todd Bell	DB
4	110	Philadelphia Eagles	Calvin Murray	RB
5	131	San Diego Chargers	Keith Ferguson	LB
6	163	Dallas Cowboys	Vince Skillings	DB
10	274	Atlanta Falcons	Robert Murphy	DB
12	331	Philadelphia Eagles	Ray Ellis	DB

Tom Orosz Punter

1982 NFL draft selections
Round	Pick #	Team	Player	Position
1	4	Baltimore Colts	Art Schlichter	QB
4	105	Philadelphia Eagles	Anthony Griggs	LB
12	317	St. Louis Cardinals	Bob Atha	K

1983 NFL draft selections
Round	Pick #	Team	Player	Position
11	304	Cincinnati Bengals	Gary Williams	WR
11	306	Miami Dolphins	Joe Lukens	OG
11	307	San Diego Chargers	Tim Spencer	RB

1984 NFL draft selections
Round	Pick #	Team	Player	Position
1	27	New York Giants	William Roberts	OG
2	56	San Francisco 49ers	John Frank	TE
6	165	Miami Dolphins	Rowland Tatum	LB
10	271	Chicago Bears	Shaun Gayle	DB
10	274	L.A. Rams	Joe Dooley	C
12	310	Tampa Bay Buccaneers	Thad Jemison	WR

1985 NFL draft selections
Round	Pick #	Team	Player	Position
1	12	San Diego Chargers	Jim Lachey	OT
3	59	Minnesota Vikings	Kirk Lowdermilk	C
6	147	Cleveland Browns	Mark Krerowicz	OG

1986 NFL draft selections
Round	Pick #	Team	Player	Position
1	10	Philadelphia Eagles	Keith Byars	RB
2	51	New York Giants	Pepper Johnson	LB
7	176	Philadelphia Eagles	Byron Lee	LB
7	193	Miami Dolphins	Larry Kolic	LB

1987 NFL draft selections
Round	Pick #	Team	Player	Position
6	157	Cincinnati Bengals	Sonny Gordon	DB
7	173	San Diego Chargers	Jamie Holland	WR
9	234	New Orleans Saints	Scott Leach	LB
12	322	Miami Dolphins	Jim Karsatos	QB

1987 NFL Supplemental Draft selection (counts as a 1988 pick)
Round	Pick #	Team	Player	Position
4	-	Philadelphia Eagles	Cris Carter	WR

1988 NFL draft selections
Round	Pick #	Team	Player	Position
1	16	Miami Dolphins	Eric Kumerow	OLB
2	29	Detroit Lions	Chris Spielman	ILB
3	56	Atlanta Falcons	Alex Higdon	TE
3	68	Phoenix Cardinals	Tom Tupa	QB\P
4	85	Detroit Lions	William White	DB
6	156	Miami Dolphins	George Cooper	RB
7	185	Seattle Seahawks	Ray Jackson	DB
10	277	Washington Redskins	Henry Brown	DE

1989 NFL draft selections
Round	Pick #	Team	Player	Position
5	121	Miami Dolphins	Jeff Uhlenhake	C
5	127	Green Bay Packers	Vince Workman	RB
9	226	Detroit Lions	Derek MaCcready	DE
12	335	Minnesota Vikings	Everett Ross	WR

1990 NFL draft selections
Round	Pick #	Team	Player	Position
5	111	Denver Broncos	Jeff Davidson	OG
7	185	San Diego Chargers	Joe Staysniak	OG
9	243	Washington Redskins	Tim Moxley	OG

1991 NFL draft selections
Round	Pick #	Team	Player	Position
1	19	Green Bay Packers	Vinnie Clark	CB
2	46	Pittsburgh Steelers	Jeff Graham	WR
11	300	Kansas City Chiefs	Bobby Olive	WR

1992 NFL draft selections
Round	Pick #	Team	Player	Position
1	22	Chicago Bears	Alonzo Spellman	DE
7	188	Pittsburgh Steelers	Scottie Graham	RB
8	211	New York Giants	Kent Graham	QB

1993 NFL draft selections
Round	Pick #	Team	Player	Position
1	21	Minnesota Vikings	Robert Smith	RB
2	38	Atlanta Falcons	Roger Harper	S
3	59	Cincinnati Bengals	Steve Tovar	LB
8	210	Denver Broncos	Brian Stablein	WR

1994 NFL draft selections
Round	Pick #	Team	Player	Position
1	1	Cincinnati Bengals	Dan Wilkinson	DT
3	66	Cincinnati Bengals	Jeff Cothran	RB
4	114	Chicago Bears	Raymont Harris	FB
6	186	New York Giants	Jason Winrow	OG
7	212	Denver Broncos	Butler By'not'e	CB

1995 NFL draft selections
Round	Pick #	Team	Player	Position
1	8	Seattle Seahawks	Joey Galloway	WR
1	24	Minnesota Vikings	Korey Stringer	OT
1	30	Cleveland Browns	Craig Powell	LB
3	67	Houston Oilers	Chris Sanders	WR
3	76	Buffalo Bills	Marlon Kerner	CB
3	77	Atlanta Falcons	Lorenzo Styles	LB
3	98	San Diego Chargers	Preston Harrison	LB
5	167	Arizona Cardinals	Tito Paul	CB

1996 NFL draft selections
Round	Pick #	Team	Player	Position
1	7	New England Patriots	Terry Glenn	WR
1	9	Oakland Raiders	Rickey Dudley	TE
1	14	Houston Oilers	Eddie George	RB
3	85	Philadelphia Eagles	Bobby Hoying	QB

1997 NFL draft selections
Round	Pick #	Team	Player	Position
1	1	St. Louis Rams	Orlando Pace	OT
1	3	Seattle Seahawks	Shawn Springs	CB
2	33	New Orleans Saints	Rob Kelly	S
3	84	Arizona Cardinals	Ty Howard	CB
3	91	Pittsburgh Steelers	Mike Vrabel	DE
4	129	Dallas Cowboys	Nicky Sualua	FB
6	189	Carolina Panthers	Matt Finkes	DE

1998 NFL draft selections
N/A

1999 NFL draft selections
Round	Pick #	Team	Player	Position
1	8	Arizona Cardinals	David Boston	WR
1	23	Buffalo Bills	Antoine Winfield	CB
1	28	New England Patriots	Andy Katzenmoyer	LB
2	49	New York Giants	Joe Montgomery	RB
4	101	St. Louis Rams	Joe Germaine	QB
4	128	Philadelphia Eagles	Damon Moore	SS
6	192	Miami Dolphins	Brent Bartholomew	P
6	196	Green Bay Packers	Dee Miller	WR

2000 NFL draft selections
Round	Pick #	Team	Player	Position
1	24	San Francisco 49ers	Ahmed Plummer	CB
4	98	Green Bay Packers	Na'il Diggs	LB
4	126	Green Bay Packers	Gary Berry	S
5	144	Dallas Cowboys	Michael Wiley	RB
7	223	Chicago Bears	James Cotton	DE
7	228	New Orleans Saints	Kevin Houser	LS

2001 NFL draft selections
Round	Pick #	Team	Player	Position
1	21	Buffalo Bills	Nate Clements	CB
1	29	St. Louis Rams	Ryan Pickett	DT
6	181	Pittsburgh Steelers	Rodney Bailey	DE
7	214	Buffalo Bills	Reggie Germany	WR
7	228	Oakland Raiders	Derek Combs	CB
7	229	Oakland Raiders	Ken-Yon Rambo	WR

2002 NFL draft selections
Round	Pick #	Team	Player	Position
2	44	New Orleans Saints	LeCharles Bentley	C
3	75	Dallas Cowboys	Derek Ross	CB
4	99	Houston Texans	Jonathan Wells	RB
4	122	Cleveland Browns	Darnell Sanders	TE
4	129	Dallas Cowboys	Jamar Martin	FB
5	167	St. Louis Rams	Courtland Bullard	LB
6	179	Dallas Cowboys	Tyson Walter	C
6	205	St. Louis Rams	Steve Bellisari	QB

2003 NFL draft selections
Round	Pick #	Team	Player	Position
2	58	Indianapolis Colts	Mike Doss	S
3	79	Green Bay Packers	Kenny Peterson	DT
3	86	New Orleans Saints	Cie Grant	LB
4	112	San Diego Chargers	Matt Wilhelm	LB
5	154	Tennessee Titans	Donnie Nickey	S

2004 NFL draft selections
Round	Pick #	Team	Player	Position
1	18	New Orleans Saints	Will Smith	DE
1	28	Carolina Panthers	Chris Gamble	CB
1	29	Atlanta Falcons	Michael Jenkins	WR
3	68	Indianapolis Colts	Ben Hartsock	TE
3	74	Buffalo Bills	Tim Anderson	DT
3	87	Green Bay Packers	B. J. Sander	P
3	88	Minnesota Vikings	Darrion Scott	DE
4	100	Arizona Cardinals	Alex Stepanovich	C
4	111	Tampa Bay Buccaneers	Will Allen	FS
5	148	Chicago Bears	Craig Krenzel	QB
5	163	Carolina Panthers	Drew Carter	WR
5	165	Tennessee Titans	Rob Reynolds	LB
7	209	San Diego Chargers	Shane Olivea	OT
7	227	Philadelphia Eagles	Adrien Clarke	G

2005 NFL draft selections
Round	Pick #	Team	Player	Position
2	47	New York Jets	Mike Nugent	K
3	80	Minnesota Vikings	Dustin Fox	CB
3	101	Denver Broncos	Maurice Clarett	RB

2006 NFL draft selections
Round	Pick #	Team	Player	Position
1	5	Green Bay Packers	A. J. Hawk	LB
1	8	Buffalo Bills	Donte Whitner	S
1	18	Dallas Cowboys	Bobby Carpenter	LB
1	25	Pittsburgh Steelers	Santonio Holmes	WR
1	29	New York Jets	Nick Mangold	C
3	70	Buffalo Bills	Ashton Youboty	CB
3	76	New York Jets	Anthony Schlegel	LB
4	121	Carolina Panthers	Nate Salley	S
4	128	Seattle Seahawks	Rob Sims	G

2007 NFL draft selections
Round	Pick #	Team	Player	Position
1	9	Miami Dolphins	Ted Ginn Jr.	WR
1	32	Indianapolis Colts	Anthony Gonzalez	WR
3	98	Indianapolis Colts	Quinn Pitcock	DE
4	107	New Orleans Saints	Antonio Pittman	RB
5	138	Oakland Raiders	Jay Richardson	DT
5	169	Indianapolis Colts	Roy Hall	WR
5	174	Baltimore Ravens	Troy Smith	QB
6	198	Atlanta Falcons	Doug Datish	C

2008 NFL draft selections
Round	Pick #	Team	Player	Position
1	6	New York Jets	Vernon Gholston	DL
7	214	San Francisco 49ers	Larry Grant	LB
7	247	Chicago Bears	Kirk Barton	OT

2009 NFL draft selections
Round	Pick #	Team	Player	Position
1	14	New Orleans Saints	Malcolm Jenkins	CB
1	31	Arizona Cardinals	Chris Wells	RB
2	35	St. Louis Rams	James Laurinaitis	LB
2	36	Cleveland Browns	Brian Robiskie	WR
4	102	Kansas City Chiefs	Donald Washington	DB
4	108	Miami Dolphins	Brian Hartline	WR
5	154	Chicago Bears	Marcus Freeman	LB

2010 NFL draft selections
Round	Pick #	Team	Player	Position
4	116	Pittsburgh Steelers	Thaddeus Gibson	DE
7	242	Pittsburgh Steelers	Doug Worthington	DT
7	244	Philadelphia Eagles	Kurt Coleman	SS
7	252	Miami Dolphins	Austin Spitler	LB

2011 NFL draft selections
Round	Pick #	Team	Player	Position
1	31	Pittsburgh Steelers	Cameron Heyward	DL
4	113	Oakland Raiders	Chimdi Chekwa	CB
5	158	St. Louis Rams	Jermale Hines	S
6	193	Philadelphia Eagles	Brian Rolle	LB
6	200	Minnesota Vikings	Ross Homan	LB

2011 NFL Supplemental Draft selection (counts as a 2012 pick)
Round	Pick #	Team	Player	Position
3	-	Oakland Raiders	Terrelle Pryor	QB

2012 NFL draft selections
Round	Pick #	Team	Player	Position
2	56	Pittsburgh Steelers	Mike Adams	OT
3	68	Houston Texans	DeVier Posey	WR
6	191	Cincinnati Bengals	Dan Herron	RB
6	197	New England Patriots	Nate Ebner	S

2013 NFL draft selections
Round	Pick #	Team	Player	Position
2	49	New York Giants	Johnathan Hankins	DT
4	129	Baltimore Ravens	John Simon	DE
7	240	Cincinnati Bengals	Reid Fragel	OT

2014 NFL draft selections
Round	Pick #	Team	Player	Position
1	15	Pittsburgh Steelers	Ryan Shazier	LB
1	31	Denver Broncos	Bradley Roby	CB
2	57	San Francisco 49ers	Carlos Hyde	RB
2	59	Indianapolis Colts	Jack Mewhort	OT
5	161	Green Bay Packers	Corey Linsley	C
7	241	St. Louis Rams	Christian Bryant	S

2015 NFL draft selections
Round	Pick #	Team	Player	Position
2	37	New York Jets	Devin Smith	WR
3	92	Denver Broncos	Jeff Heuerman	TE
4	121	Pittsburgh Steelers	Doran Grant	CB
6	180	Jacksonville Jaguars	Michael Bennett	DT
6	187	Washington Redskins	Evan Spencer	WR

2016 NFL draft selections
Round	Pick #	Team	Player	Position
1	3	San Diego Chargers	Joey Bosa	DE
1	4	Dallas Cowboys	Ezekiel Elliott	RB
1	10	New York Giants	Eli Apple	CB
1	16	Detroit Lions	Taylor Decker	OT
1	20	New York Jets	Darron Lee	LB
2	47	New Orleans Saints	Michael Thomas	WR
2	61	New Orleans Saints	Vonn Bell	S
3	80	Buffalo Bills	Adolphus Washington	DT
3	85	Houston Texans	Braxton Miller	WR
3	94	Seattle Seahawks	Nick Vannett	TE
4	102	San Diego Chargers	Joshua Perry	LB
4	139	Buffalo Bills	Cardale Jones	QB

2017 NFL draft selections
Round	Pick #	Team	Player	Position
1	11	New Orleans Saints	Marshon Lattimore	CB
1	15	Indianapolis Colts	Malik Hooker	S
1	24	Oakland Raiders	Gareon Conley	CB
2	40	Carolina Panthers	Curtis Samuel	WR
2	54	Miami Dolphins	Raekwon McMillan	LB
3	70	Minnesota Vikings	Pat Elflein	C
7	239	Dallas Cowboys	Noah Brown	WR

2018 NFL draft selections
Round	Pick #	Team	Player	Position
1	4	Cleveland Browns	Denzel Ward	CB
1	21	Cincinnati Bengals	Billy Price	C
2	64	Indianapolis Colts	Tyquan Lewis	DE
3	73	Miami Dolphins	Jerome Baker	LB
3	77	Cincinnati Bengals	Sam Hubbard	DE
4	102	Minnesota Vikings	Jalyn Holmes	DE
5	168	Seattle Seahawks	Jamarco Jones	OT

2019 NFL draft selections
Round	Pick #	Team	Player	Position
1	2	San Francisco 49ers	Nick Bosa	DE
1	15	Washington Redskins	Dwayne Haskins	QB
2	59	Indianapolis Colts	Parris Campbell	WR
3	71	Denver Broncos	Dre'Mont Jones	DT
3	76	Washington Redskins	Terry McLaurin	WR
4	111	Atlanta Falcons	Kendall Sheffield	CB
4	136	Cincinnati Bengals	Michael Jordan	G
6	202	Miami Dolphins	Isaiah Prince	OT
7	218	Dallas Cowboys	Mike Weber	RB

2020 NFL draft selections
Round	Pick #	Team	Player	Position
1	2	Washington Redskins	Chase Young	DE
1	3	Detroit Lions	Jeff Okudah	CB
1	19	Las Vegas Raiders	Damon Arnette	CB
2	55	Baltimore Ravens	J. K. Dobbins	RB
3	73	Jacksonville Jaguars	DaVon Hamilton	DT
3	75	Detroit Lions	Jonah Jackson	G
3	98	Baltimore Ravens	Malik Harrison	LB
6	199	Los Angeles Rams	Jordan Fuller	S
7	220	Los Angeles Chargers	K. J. Hill	WR
7	235	Detroit Lions	Jashon Cornell	DT

2021 NFL draft selections
Round	Pick #	Team	Player	Position
1	11	Chicago Bears	Justin Fields	QB
2	60	New Orleans Saints	Pete Werner	LB
2	62	Green Bay Packers	Josh Myers	C
3	86	Minnesota Vikings	Wyatt Davis	G
3	88	San Francisco 49ers	Trey Sermon	RB
3	105	Denver Broncos	Baron Browning	LB
4	132	Cleveland Browns	Tommy Togiai	DT
5	145	Jacksonville Jaguars	Luke Farrell	TE
5	160	Baltimore Ravens	Shaun Wade	CB
7	239	Denver Broncos	Jonathon Cooper	DE

2022 NFL draft selections
Round	Pick #	Team	Player	Position
1	10	New York Jets	Garrett Wilson	WR
1	11	New Orleans Saints	Chris Olave	WR
3	69	Tennessee Titans	Nicholas Petit-Frere	OT
3	101	New York Jets	Jeremy Ruckert	TE
5	158	Seattle Seahawks	Tyreke Smith	DE
7	238	Las Vegas Raiders	Thayer Munford	OT

2023 NFL draft selections
Round	Pick #	Team	Player	Position
1	2	Houston Texans	C. J. Stroud	QB
1	6	Arizona Cardinals	Paris Johnson Jr.	OT
1	20	Seattle Seahawks	Jaxon Smith-Njigba	WR
3	75	Atlanta Falcons	Zach Harrison	DE
4	111	Cleveland Browns	Dawand Jones	OT
6	190	Cleveland Browns	Luke Wypler	C

2024 NFL draft selections
Round	Pick #	Team	Player	Position
1	4	Arizona Cardinals	Marvin Harrison Jr.	WR
2	54	Cleveland Browns	Mike Hall Jr.	DT
4	123	Houston Texans	Cade Stover	TE
5	148	Las Vegas Raiders	Tommy Eichenberg	LB

2025 NFL draft selections
Round	Pick #	Team	Player	Position
1	19	Tampa Bay Buccaneers	Emeka Egbuka	WR
1	24	Minnesota Vikings	Donovan Jackson	OG
1	28	Detroit Lions	Tyleik Williams	DT
1	32	Kansas City Chiefs	Josh Simmons	OT
2	36	Cleveland Browns	Quinshon Judkins	RB
2	38	New England Patriots	TreVeyon Henderson	RB
2	45	Indianapolis Colts	JT Tuimoloau	DE
4	115	Arizona Cardinals	Cody Simon	LB
4	122	Carolina Panthers	Lathan Ransom	S
4	123	Pittsburgh Steelers	Jack Sawyer	DE
5	148	Los Angeles Rams	Ty Hamilton	DT
5	170	Buffalo Bills	Jordan Hancock	CB
5	174	Arizona Cardinals	Denzel Burke	CB
6	185	Pittsburgh Steelers	Will Howard	QB

2026 NFL draft selections
Round	Pick #	Team	Player	Position
1	4	Tennessee Titans	Carnell Tate	WR
1	5	New York Giants	Arvell Reese	LB
1	7	Washington Commanders	Sonny Styles	LB
1	11	Dallas Cowboys	Caleb Downs	S
2	36	Houston Texans	Kayden McDonald	DT
2	61	Los Angeles Rams	Max Klare	TE
2	62	Buffalo Bills	Davison Igbinosun	CB
3	87	Miami Dolphins	Will Kacmarek	TE
5	172	New Orleans Saints	Lorenzo Styles Jr.	S
6	214	Indianapolis Colts	Caden Curry	DE
7	231	Atlanta Falcons	Ethan Onianwa	T

== Notable undrafted players ==
Year	Player	Debut team	Position
1941	Frank Clair	Washington Redskins	End
1945	Sammy Fox	New York Giants	End
1946	George Cheroke	Cleveland Browns	OG
1946	Lou Groza	Cleveland Browns	K
1946	Bill Willis	Cleveland Browns	DT
1947	Spiro Dellerba	Cleveland Browns	LB/FB
1950	Ray DiPierro	Green Bay Packers	OG
1960	Glenn Davis	Detroit Lions	WR
1974	Fred Pagac	Chicago Bears	TE
1978	Doug Mackie	New York Giants	OL
1979	Wade Manning	Dallas Cowboys	WR
1979	Tim Vogler	Buffalo Bills	OL
1980	Gary Dulin	New York Giants	DL
1981	Tom Orosz	Miami Dolphins	P
1982	Luther Henson	New England Patriots	DL
1983	Chris Riehm	Los Angeles Raiders	DL
1985	Orlando Lowry	Indianapolis Colts	LB
1985	Mike Tomczak	Chicago Bears	QB
1986	Rory Graves	Seattle Seahawks	OL
1992	John Kacherski	Denver Broncos	LB
1993	Allen DeGraffenreid	Cincinnati Bengals	WR
1994	Alan Kline	New Orleans Saints	OT
1994	Cedric Saunders	Tampa Bay Buccaneers	TE
1994	Mark Williams	Green Bay Packers	LB
1997	Greg Bellisari	Tampa Bay Buccaneers	LB
1997	LeShun Daniels	Minnesota Vikings	OG
1998	Winfield Garnett	Minnesota Vikings	LB
1999	Central McClellion	Washington Redskins	DB
1999	Rob Murphy	Kansas City Chiefs	OL
2005	Bam Childress	New England Patriots	WR
2005	Simon Fraser	Cleveland Browns	DE
2006	Tyler Everett	Chicago Bears	S
2006	Marcus Green	Seattle Seahawks	DT
2009	Alex Boone	San Francisco 49ers	OL
2010	Jake Ballard	New York Giants	TE
2010	Jim Cordle	New York Giants	OL
2010	Aaron Pettrey	Cincinnati Bengals	K
2010	Anderson Russell	Washington Redskins	S
2011	Bryant Browning	Carolina Panthers	OL
2011	Jake McQuaide	Los Angeles Rams	LS
2011	Brandon Saine	Green Bay Packers	RB
2011	Dane Sanzenbacher	Chicago Bears	WR
2012	Mike Brewster	Jacksonville Jaguars	OL
2012	JB Shugarts	Cleveland Browns	OL
2013	Jake Stoneburner	Green Bay Packers	TE
2014	Corey Brown	Carolina Panthers	WR
2014	Andrew Norwell	Carolina Panthers	OL
2015	Curtis Grant	New York Giants	LB
2015	Rod Smith	Seattle Seahawks	RB
2016	Jalin Marshall	New York Jets	WR
2016	Tyvis Powell	Seattle Seahawks	S
2017	Cameron Johnston	Philadelphia Eagles	P
2018	Marcus Baugh	Washington Redskins	TE
2018	Chris Worley	Cincinnati Bengals	LB
2020	Rashod Berry	New England Patriots	TE/DE
2020	Austin Mack	New York Giants	WR
2021	Tuf Borland	Minnesota Vikings	LB
2021	Drue Chrisman	Cincinnati Bengals	P
2021	Blake Haubeil	Tennessee Titans	K
2021	Jake Hausmann	Detroit Lions	TE
2021	Justin Hilliard	San Francisco 49ers	LB
2022	Haskell Garrett	Tennessee Titans	DT
2022	Master Teague	Chicago Bears	RB
2023	Cameron Brown	Los Angeles Chargers	CB
2023	Jerron Cage	New Orleans Saints	DT
2023	Ronnie Hickman	Cleveland Browns	S
2024	Steele Chambers	Detroit Lions	LB
2024	Xavier Johnson	Buffalo Bills	WR
2024	Matthew Jones	Miami Dolphins	OG
2024	Josh Proctor	Jacksonville Jaguars	S
2025	Seth McLaughlin	Cincinnati Bengals	C
2025	Gee Scott Jr.	New England Patriots	TE
2025	Josh Fryar	Arizona Cardinals	OT
2026	CJ Donaldson	New Orleans Saints	RB
2026	John Ferlmann	Cleveland Browns	LS
2026	Tywone Malone Jr.	New Orleans Saints	DT
