= 1993 Ohio State Buckeyes football team =

American college football season

1993 Ohio State Buckeyes football

Big Ten co-champion Holiday Bowl champion

Holiday Bowl, W 28–21 vs. BYU
- Conference: Big Ten Conference

Ranking
- Coaches: No. 10
- AP: No. 11
- Record: 10–1–1 (6–1–1 Big Ten)
- Head coach: John Cooper (6th season)
- Offensive coordinator: Joe Hollis (2nd season)
- Offensive scheme: Singleback
- Defensive coordinator: Bill Young (6th season)
- Base defense: 4–3 stack
- MVP: Raymont Harris
- Captains: Alan Kline; Chico Nelson; Cedric Saunders; Jason Simmons
- Home stadium: Ohio Stadium

1993 Big Ten Conference football standings
	Conf.					Overall
Team	W		L		T	W		L		T
No. 6 Wisconsin +	6	–	1	–	1	10	–	1	–	1
No. 11 Ohio State +	6	–	1	–	1	10	–	1	–	1
No. 8 Penn State	6	–	2	–	0	10	–	2	–	0
Indiana	5	–	3	–	0	8	–	4	–	0
No. 21 Michigan	5	–	3	–	0	8	–	4	–	0
Illinois	5	–	3	–	0	5	–	6	–	0
Michigan State	4	–	4	–	0	6	–	6	–	0
Iowa	3	–	5	–	0	6	–	6	–	0
Minnesota	3	–	5	–	0	4	–	7	–	0
Northwestern	0	–	8	–	0	2	–	9	–	0
Purdue	0	–	8	–	0	1	–	10	–	0
+ – Conference co-champions; Rankings from AP Poll

The 1993 Ohio State Buckeyes football team was an American football team that represented the Ohio State University as a member of the Big Ten Conference during the 1993 NCAA Division I-A football season. In their sixth year under head coach John Cooper, the Buckeyes compiled an 10–1–1 record (6–1–1 in conference games), tied with Wisconsin for the Big Ten championship, and outscored opponents by a total of 323 to 172. Against ranked opponents, they defeated No. 12 Washington, No. 25 Michigan State, No. 12 Penn State and No. 19 Indiana, tied with No. 15 Wisconsin, and lost to unranked Michigan. They concluded the season with a victory over BYU in the 1993 Holiday Bowl. The Buckeyes were ranked No. 11 in the final AP poll.

The Buckeyes gained an average of 170.9 rushing yards and 185.8 passing yards per game. On defense, they held opponents to 106.3 rushing yards and 168.2 passing yards per game. The team's statistical leaders included quarterback Bobby Hoying (1,515 passing yards, 54.5% completion percentage), running back Raymont Harris (1,109 rushing yards, 4.7 yards per carry), and wide receiver Joey Galloway (45 receptions for 927 yards, 20.6 yards per reception, 78 points scored). Defensive linemen Dan Wilkinson was a consensus first-team All-American, and two other Ohio State players received first-team honors: Galloway (Gannett) and offensive tackle Korey Stringer (AFCA, Gannett, and Scripps Howard). Five Ohio State players received first-team honors on the 1993 All-Big Ten Conference football team: Galloway; Wilkinson; Stringer; guard Jason Winrow; and linebacker Lorenzo Styles.

The team played its home games at Ohio Stadium in Columbus, Ohio.

== Schedule ==
Date	Time	Opponent	Rank	Site	TV	Result	Attendance	Source
September 4	12:30 p.m.	Rice*	No. 18	Ohio Stadium; Columbus, OH	ESPN	W 34–7	89,040	
September 11	8:00 p.m.	No. 12 Washington*	No. 16	Ohio Stadium; Columbus, OH	ABC	W 21–12	94,109	
September 18	12:00 p.m.	at Pittsburgh*	No. 11	Pitt Stadium; Pittsburgh, PA		W 63–28	41,511	
October 2	1:30 p.m.	Northwestern	No. 7	Ohio Stadium; Columbus, OH		W 51–3	92,744	
October 9	12:30 p.m.	at Illinois	No. 6	Memorial Stadium; Champaign, IL (Illibuck)	ESPN	W 20–12	61,209	
October 16	3:30 p.m.	No. 25 Michigan State	No. 5	Ohio Stadium; Columbus, OH	ABC	W 28–21	93,989	
October 23	2:00 p.m.	at Purdue	No. 3	Ross–Ade Stadium; West Lafayette, IN		W 45–24	44,038	
October 30	3:30 p.m.	No. 12 Penn State	No. 3	Ohio Stadium; Columbus, OH (rivalry)	ABC	W 24–6	95,060	
November 6	3:30 p.m.	at No. 15 Wisconsin	No. 3	Camp Randall Stadium; Madison, WI	ABC	T 14–14	77,745	
November 13	3:30 p.m.	Indiana	No. 5	Ohio Stadium; Columbus, OH	ABC	W 23–17	93,741	
November 20	12:00 p.m.	at Michigan	No. 5	Michigan Stadium; Ann Arbor, MI (rivalry)	ABC	L 0–28	106,867	
December 30	8:00 p.m.	vs. BYU*	No. 11	Jack Murphy Stadium; San Diego, CA (Holiday Bowl)	ESPN	W 28–21	52,108	
*Non-conference game; Rankings from AP Poll released prior to the game; All times are in Eastern time

== Rankings ==
Ranking movements Legend: ██ Increase in ranking ██ Decrease in ranking ( ) = First-place votes
	Week																
Poll	Pre	1	2	3	4	5	6	7	8	9	10	11	12	13	14	15	Final
AP	17	18	16	11	7	7	6	5	4	4	4	5	5	12	11	11	11
Coaches Poll	17	16	14	11	7	7	7	6	4	3	3 (1)	5	5	10	10	10	10

== Game summaries ==
=== Rice ===
The 1993 Ohio State Buckeyes opened the season against the Rice Owls of the Southwest Conference by wearing 25th anniversary tribute uniforms for the 1968 team that won the NCAA Division I National Championship. These tribute uniforms would remain the home uniform throughout the season. The Buckeyes scored all 34 of their points before Rice added a touchdown late in the game. Redshirt sophomore quarterback Bobby Hoying completed 13 passes for 144 yards and a score, junior wide receiver Joey Galloway had three catches for 92 yards and a touchdown, while senior running back Raymont Harris added 76 yards and a score on the ground. Sophomore linebacker Lorenzo Styles lead the defense with nine tackles while Tim Patillo recorded an interception that was returned 17 yards.

Rice Owls at Ohio State Buckeyes

Quarter	1	2	3	4	Total
Rice	0	0	0	7	7
Ohio State	3	17	0	14	34

at Ohio Stadium, Columbus, Ohio

- Date: September 4, 1993
- Game time: 12:30 p.m.
- Game attendance: 89,040
- Toledo Blade article from Sept. 5, 1993

Game information

First quarter

- OSU - Tim Williams 27-yard FG

Second quarter

- OSU - Raymont Harris 2-yard run (Tim Williams kick)
- OSU - Joey Galloway 48-yard pass from Bret Powers (Tim Williams kick)
- OSU - Tim Williams 39-yard FG

Fourth quarter

- OSU - Dimitrious Stanley 9-yard pass from Bobby Hoying (Tim Williams kick)
- OSU – Matt Calhoun 1-yard run (Tim Williams kick)
- RICE - Crowe 43-yard pass from LaRocca (Bagwell kick)

Top passers

- OSU – Bobby Hoying – 13/22, 144 yards, 1 TD
- RICE – Emanuel – 13/25 105 yards, 1 TD, 1 INT

Top rushers

- OSU – Raymont Harris – 16 rushes, 76 yards, 1 TD
- RICE - Emanuel - 14 rushes, 58 yards
- OSU – Butler B'ynote' – 6 rushes, 46 yards

Top receivers

- OSU – Joey Galloway - 3 receptions, 92 yards, 1 TD
- WASH - Crowe - 3 receptions, 58 yards, 1 TD

=== Washington ===
The second-ever night game at Ohio Stadium featured a visit from the defending three-peat Pac-10 champions, who were also coming off three straight Rose Bowl appearances as well. Raymont Harris and Butler B'ynote' combined for 202 yards and 2 scores on the ground, the latter's which sealed the game for Ohio State in the fourth quarter.

Washington Huskies at Ohio State Buckeyes

Quarter	1	2	3	4	Total
Washington	3	6	0	3	12
Ohio State	7	7	0	7	21

at Ohio Stadium, Columbus, Ohio

- Date: September 11, 1993
- Game time: 8:05 p.m.
- Game weather: Clear; 79 °F (26 °C); wind SW
- Game attendance: 94,109
- Referee: Dick Honig

Game information

First quarter

- OSU - Harris 2 yard run (Williams kick)
- WASH - Hanson 29 yard field goal

Second quarter

- OSU - Joey Galloway 35-yard pass from Bobby Hoying (Tim Williams kick)
- WASH - Hill 8 yard pass from Huard (pass failed)

Fourth quarter

- WASH - Hanson 21 yard field goal
- OSU - By'not'e 49 yard run (Williams kick)

Top passers

- WASH – Huard – 18/32 186 yards, 1 TD, 1 INT
- OSU – Bobby Hoying – 6/21, 142 yards, 1 TD, 1 INT

Top rushers

- OSU – Raymont Harris – 23 rushes, 102 yards, 1 TD
- OSU – Butler B'ynote' – 9 rushes, 80 yards, 1 TD

Top receivers

- OSU – Joey Galloway - 4 receptions, 104 yards, 1 TD
- WASH - Shelley - 7 receptions, 62 yards

=== Pittsburgh ===
In the first of a four-game series between the Buckeyes and Panthers, Butler B'ynote' took the opening kickoff 89 yards for a touchdown and Ohio State never looked back, scoring 35 points before Pitt got on the board. The Panthers were able to score four second half touchdowns through the air, but 11 different Buckeye rushers combined for 307 yards on the ground and five scores while Joey Galloway hauled in two touchdown passes to secure a 63-28 victory on the road.

Ohio State Buckeyes at Pittsburgh Panthers

Quarter	1	2	3	4	Total
Ohio State	28	7	7	21	63
Pittsburgh	0	0	14	14	28

at Pitt Stadium, Pittsburgh, Pennsylvania

- Date: September 18, 1993
- Game time: 12:00 p.m.
- Game weather: Partly Sunny, 64 °F (18 °C); wind 10 mph (16 km/h) NE
- Game attendance: 41,511

Game information

First quarter

- OSU - Butler B'ynote' 89-yard kickoff return (Tim Williams kick)
- OSU - Raymont Harris 4-yard run (Tim Williams kick)
- OSU - Joey Galloway 6-yard pass from Bobby Hoying (Tim Williams kick)
- OSU - Eddie George 1-yard run (Tim Williams kick)

Second quarter

- OSU - Eddie George 1-yard run (Tim Williams kick)

Third quarter

- PITT - Bill Davis 21-yard pass from John Ryan (Steve Kalmanides kick)
- PITT - Dietrich Jells 35-yard pass from John Ryan (Steve Kalmanides kick)
- OSU - Joey Galloway 6-yard run (Tim Williams kick)

Fourth quarter

- OSU - Joey Galloway 9-yard pass from Bobby Hoying (Josh Jackson kick)
- PITT - Junior Green 60-yard pass from John Ryan (Steve Kalmanides kick)
- OSU - Eric Moss 9-yard pass from Bret Powers (Josh Jackson kick)
- PITT - Dietrich Jells 17-yard pass from John Ryan (Steve Kalmanides kick)
- OSU – Keith Wilkerson 24-yard run (Josh Jackson kick)

Top passers

- PITT - John Ryan 15/21, 236 yds, 4 TDs
- OSU - Bobby Hoying 7/10, 122 yds, 2 TDs, 1 INT

Top receivers

- PITT - Junior Green 5 Rec, 111 yds, 1 TD
- PITT - Bill Davis 5 Rec, 91 yds, 1 TD
- OSU - Terry Glenn 3 Rec, 80 yds

Top rushers

- OSU - Travis McGuire 16 Rush, 78 yds
- OSU - Raymont Harris 8 Rush, 69 yds, 1 TD
- PITT - Martin 18 Rush, 57 yds

=== Northwestern ===
Beginning the 1993 Big Ten slate, Ohio State (30:54) and Northwestern (29:06) nearly had the same time of possession, but the Buckeyes dominated the upstart Wildcats defensively with 5 interceptions returned for 158 yards and 428 yards from the offensive side of the ball, 119 of which came through the air into Joey Galloway's hands. Kicker Tim Williams also set personal bests for field goals (43) and consecutive extra-points kicked (64).

Northwestern Wildcats at Ohio State Buckeyes

Quarter	1	2	3	4	Total
Northwestern	3	0	0	0	3
Ohio State	3	17	21	10	51

at Ohio Stadium, Columbus, Ohio

- Date: October 2, 1993
- Game time: 1:30 p.m.
- Game attendance: 92,744
- Toledo Blade article from Oct. 3, 1993

Game information
First quarter
- OSU - Tim Williams 39-yard FG
- NOR - Valenzisi 31-yard FG

Second quarter

- OSU - Tim Williams 20-yard FG
- OSU – Butler B'ynote' 7-yard run (Tim Williams kick)
- OSU - Raymont Harris 9-yard run (Tim Williams kick)

Third quarter

- OSU - Joey Galloway 9-yard run (Tim Williams kick)
- OSU – Jeff Cothran 2-yard run (Tim Williams kick)
- OSU – Jeff Cothran 36-yard pass from Bret Powers (Tim Williams kick)

Fourth quarter

- OSU - Josh Jackson 32-yard FG
- OSU - Travis McGuire 2-yard run (Josh Jackson kick)

=== Illinois ===
Head Coach John Cooper earned his first victory over Illinois since taking over in 1988 as the Buckeye defense kept the Fighting Illini out of the endzone. The offense put up 230 total yards, led by Raymont Harris' 90 on the ground and Cedric Saunders' 31 through the air.

Ohio State Buckeyes at Illinois Fighting Illini

Quarter	1	2	3	4	Total
Ohio State	10	7	0	3	20
Illinois	0	3	9	0	12

at Memorial Stadium, Champaign, Illinois

- Date: October 9, 1993
- Game time: 12:30 EST
- Game weather: Overcast; 47 °F (8 °C); wind 20 mph (32 km/h) N
- Game attendance: 61,209
- Referee: Ron Winter

Game information
First quarter
- OSU - Joey Galloway 11 yard pass from Bobby Hoying (Tim Williams kick)
- OSU - Tim Williams 52 yard field goal

Second quarter

- ILL - Richardson 29 yard field goal
- OSU - Terry Glenn recovers fumble in end zone (Tim Williams kick)

Third quarter

- ILL - Richardson 21 yard field goal
- ILL - Richardson 36 yard field goal
- ILL - Richardson 26 yard field goal

Fourth quarter

- OSU - Tim Williams 39 yard field goal

=== Michigan State ===
Michigan State Spartans at Ohio State Buckeyes

Quarter	1	2	3	4	Total
Michigan State	3	7	0	11	21
Ohio State	7	14	0	7	28

at Ohio Stadium, Columbus, Ohio

- Date: October 16, 1993
- Game time: 3:30 p.m.
- Game weather: Overcast; 62 °F (17 °C); wind 8 mph (13 km/h) SE
- Game attendance: 93,989
- Referee: Dick Honig

Game information

First quarter

- OSU - Joey Galloway 22-yard pass from Bobby Hoying (Tim Williams kick)
- MSU - Bill Stoyanovich 47-yard field goal

Second quarter

- OSU - Joey Galloway 64-yard pass from Bret Powers (Tim Williams kick)
- MSU - Steve Holman 1-yard run (Bill Stoyanovich kick)
- OSU - Joey Galloway 14-yard pass from Bobby Hoying (Tim Williams kick)

Fourth quarter

- MSU - Stoyanovich 21-yard field goal
- MSU - Scott Greene 38-yard pass from Jim Miller (Mill Coleman pass from Jim Miller)
- OSU - Raymont Harris 7-yard run (Tim Williams kick)

Top passers

- MSU - Jim Miller 31/42, 360 yds, 1 TD
- OSU - Bobby Hoying 14/21, 181 yds, 2 TDs, 2 INTs
- OSU - Bret Powers 7/10, 113 yds, 1 TD

Top receivers

- OSU - Joey Galloway 9 Rec, 186 yds, 3 TDs
- MSU - Outlaw 5 Rec, 117 yds
- MSU - Scott Greene 4 Rec, 69 yds, 1 TD

Top rushers

- OSU - Raymont Harris 22 Rush, 103 yds, 1 TD
- MSU - Steve Holman 17 Rush, 52 yds, 1 TD

=== Purdue ===
Ohio State jumped out to a 35-0 lead highlighted by Marlon Kerner's 100-yard interception return for a touchdown as three different running backs scored touchdowns and defensive lineman Matt Finkes recovered a fumble in the endzone for another score.

Ohio State Buckeyes at Purdue Boilermakers

Quarter	1	2	3	4	Total
Ohio State	14	21	7	3	45
Purdue	0	7	0	17	24

at Ross–Ade Stadium, West Lafayette, Indiana

- Date: October 23, 1993
- Game weather: Sunny, 62 °F (17 °C); wind 11 mph (18 km/h) SW
- Game attendance: 44,038
- Referee: Jerry Hendrickson

Game information

First quarter

- OSU - Raymont Harris 11-yard run (Tim Williams kick)
- OSU - Raymont Harris 3-yard run (Tim Williams kick)

Second quarter

- OSU - Eddie George 1-yard run (Tim Williams kick)
- OSU - Marlon Kerner 100-yard interception return (Tim Williams kick)
- OSU - Butler By'not'e 1-yard run (Tim Williams kick)
- PUR - Jeff Hill 23-yard pass from Rick Trefzger (Bobich kick)

Third quarter

- OSU - Matt Finkes recovered fumble in end zone (Tim Williams kick)

Fourth quarter

- PUR - Bobich 23-yard field goal
- OSU - Josh Jackson 20-yard field goal
- PUR - Mike Alstott 1-yard run (Bobich kick)
- PUR - Jeff Hill 9-yard pass from Rick Trefzger (Bobich kick)

Top passers

- PUR – Rick Trefzger – 17/29, 245 yards, 1 INT
- OSU – Bobby Hoying – 10/12, 105 yards

Top rushers

- OSU – Raymont Harris – 18 rushes, 118 yards, 2 TDs
- OSU – Eddie George – 11 rushes, 96 yards, 1 TD
- OSU – Butler B'ynote' – 9 rushes, 95 yards, 1 TD

Top receivers

- PUR – Burt Thornton - 5 receptions, 85 yards
- PUR – Jeff Hill – 4 receptions, 53 yards, 2 TDs
- OSU - Buster Tillman - 3 receptions, 45 yards

=== Penn State ===
1993 was Penn State's first year playing football in the Big Ten Conference and this was their first conference matchup with Ohio State.

Penn State Nittany Lions at Ohio State Buckeyes

Quarter	1	2	3	4	Total
Penn State	6	0	0	0	6
Ohio State	7	10	7	0	24

at Ohio Stadium, Columbus, Ohio

- Date: October 30, 1993
- Game time: 3:30 p.m.
- Game weather: Snow flurries, 34 °F (1 °C)
- Game attendance: 95,060
- Referee: Dick Honig
- TV announcers (ABC): Keith Jackson and Bob Griese

Game information

First quarter

- PSU – Craig Fayak 29-yard field goal, 12:54. Penn St 3–0. Drive: 13 plays, 53 yards, 2:06.
- OSU – Raymont Harris 4-yard run (Tim Williams kick), 10:03. Ohio St 7–3. Drive: 8 plays, 65 yards, 2:43.
- PSU – Craig Fayak 49-yard field goal, 7:39. Ohio St 7–6. Drive: 8 plays, 34 yards, 2:24.

Second quarter

- OSU – Tim Williams 22-yard field goal, 14:56. Ohio St 10–6. Drive: 10 plays, 49 yards, 4:23.
- OSU – Joey Galloway 25-yard pass from Bret Powers (Tim Williams kick), 11:19. Ohio St 17–6. Drive: 8 plays, 64 yards, 3:24.

Third quarter

- OSU – Butler B'ynote' 4-yard run (Tim Williams kick), 10:17. Ohio St 24–6. Drive: 9 plays, 68 yards, 4:43.

Top passers

- PSU – Kerry Collins – 13/39, 122 yards, 4 INT
- OSU – Bobby Hoying – 4/11, 107 yards

Top rushers

- PSU – Ki-Jana Carter – 24 rushes, 123 yards
- OSU – Raymont Harris – 32 rushes, 151 yards, TD

Top receivers

- PSU – Kyle Brady – 4 receptions, 36 yards
- OSU – Chris Sanders – 2 receptions, 56 yards

=== Wisconsin ===
Ohio State jumped out to a 1st quarter 7-0 lead with a Raymont Harris TD run, then Wisconsin added touchdowns in the 2nd and 3rd quarters to go up 14-7. Ohio State tied it up in the 4th quarter after a 26-yard Powers-to-Galloway TD pass. With 0:07 left on the clock, Rick Schnetzky attempted a 22 yard field goal for the Badgers that was blocked by Marlon Kerner. The game ended in a 14-14 tie, which is the most recent tied game for Ohio State.

Ohio State Buckeyes at Wisconsin Badgers

Quarter	1	2	3	4	Total
Ohio State	7	0	0	7	14
Wisconsin	0	7	7	0	14

at Camp Randall Stadium, Madison, Wisconsin

- Date: November 6, 1993
- Game time: 3:30 p.m.
- Game weather: Snow, 30 °F (−1 °C); wind 10–15 mph (16–24 km/h) NW
- Game attendance: 77,745
- Referee: Ron Winter
- TV: ABC

Game information
First quarter
- OSU – Raymont Harris 3-yard run (Tim Williams kick)

Second quarter

- WIS – Lee DeRamus 8-yard pass from Darrell Bevell (Rick Schnetzky kick)

Third quarter

- WIS – Brent Moss 3-yard run (Rick Schnetzky kick)

Fourth quarter

- OSU – Joey Galloway 26-yard pass from Bret Powers (Tim Williams kick)

=== Indiana ===
Indiana Hoosiers at Ohio State Buckeyes

Quarter	1	2	3	4	Total
Indiana	0	10	0	7	17
Ohio State	0	17	6	0	23

at Ohio Stadium, Columbus, Ohio

- Date: November 13, 1993
- Game time: 3:30 p.m.
- Game attendance: 93,741
- Toledo Blade article from Nov. 14, 1993

Game information
Second quarter
- OSU – Joey Galloway 4-yard pass from Bobby Hoying (Tim Williams kick)
- OSU - Tim Williams 36-yard FG
- IND - Manolopoulos 31-yard FG
- IND - Thomas Lewis 28-yard pass from Dittoe (Manolopoulos kick)
- OSU - Buster Tillman 5-yard pass from Bret Powers (Tim Williams kick)

Third quarter

- OSU - Tim Williams 23-yard FG
- OSU - Tim Williams 22-yard FG

Fourth quarter

- IND – Jermaine Chaney 26-yard run (Manolopoulos kick)

=== Michigan ===
Ohio State Buckeyes at Michigan Wolverines

Quarter	1	2	3	4	Total
Ohio State	0	0	0	0	0
Michigan	7	14	7	0	28

at Michigan Stadium, Ann Arbor, Michigan

- Date: November 20, 1993
- Game weather: Sunny, low 30s
- Game attendance: 106,867
- TV: ABC

Game information

First quarter

- MICH – Mercury Hayes 25-yard pass from Todd Collins (Peter Elezvoic kick), 6:34. Michigan 7–0. Drive: 5 plays, 81 yards, 2:04.

Second quarter

- MICH – Jon Ritchie 1-yard run (Peter Elezvoic kick), 5:30. Michigan 14–0. Drive: 5 plays, 99 yards, 1:24.
- MICH – Che Foster 3-yard pass from Todd Collins (Peter Elezovic kick), 2:13. Michigan 21–0. Drive: 6 plays, 31 yards, 3:06.

Third quarter

- MICH – Ed Davis 5-yard run (Peter Elezvoic kick), 10:39. Michigan 28–0. Drive: 4 plays, 32 yards, 1:05.

Top passers

- OSU – Bobby Hoying – 11/24, 134 yards, INT
- MICH – Todd Collins – 14/20, 140 yards, 2 TD, INT

Top rushers

- OSU – Raymont Harris – 14 rushes, 65 yards
- MICH – Tyrone Wheatley – 16 rushes, 105 yards

Top receivers

- OSU – Cedric Saunders – 6 receptions, 65 yards
- MICH – Derrick Alexander – 3 receptions, 64 yards

=== 1993 Holiday Bowl ===
Ohio State Buckeyes vs BYU Cougars

Quarter	1	2	3	4	Total
Ohio State	14	7	7	0	28
BYU	7	14	0	0	21

at Jack Murphy Stadium, San Diego, California

- Date: December 30, 1993
- Game time: 8:00 p.m. EST
- Game weather: Fair, 66 °F (19 °C), Wind 8 mph (13 km/h) WSW
- Game attendance: 52,108
- Referee: Lloyd Dale

Game information

First quarter

- OSU – Tim Patillo 20-yard punt return after Tim Patillo block (Tim Williams kick)
- BYU - Willis 27-yard pass from Walsh (Herrick kick)
- OSU - Raymont Harris 2-yard run (Tim Williams kick)

Second quarter

- OSU - Raymont Harris 2-yard run (Tim Williams kick)
- BYU - Lewis 8-yard pass from Walsh (Herrick kick)
- BYU - Doman 27-yard pass from Walsh (Herrick kick)

Third quarter

- OSU - Raymont Harris 1-yard run (Tim Williams kick)

Top passers

- BYU - Walsh - 25/44, 389 yards, 3 TDs, 1 INT
- OSU – Bobby Hoying – 5/11, 55 yards

Top rushers

- OSU – Raymont Harris – 39 rushes, 235 yards, 3 TDs
- OSU – Butler B'ynote' – 9 rushes, 61 yards

Top receivers

- BYU - Doman - 3 receptions, 82 yards, 1 TD
- BYU - Willis - 2 receptions, 72 yards, 1 TD
- BYU - Lewis - 4 receptions, 41 yards, 1 TD

== Roster ==
1993 Ohio State Buckeyes football team roster
Players
Coaches
Offense

Pos.	#	Name	Class
RB	33	Butler B'ynote'	Sr
WR	1	DeWayne Carter	Jr
FB	39	Matt Calhoun	So
FB	29	Jeff Cothran	Sr
G	57	LeShun Daniels	So
OT	64	Mike Dully
WR	7	Joey Galloway	Jr
WR	83	Terry Glenn	So
RB	27	Eddie George	So
RB	34	Raymont Harris	Sr
TE	88	Bob Houser	Fr
FB	42	William Houston
QB	14	Bobby Hoying	So
QB	8	Stanley Jackson	Fr
QB	11	Mark Zban	Fr
TE	89	D.J. Jones	So
OT	67	Alan Kline	Sr
RB	6	Travis McGuire	So
G	77	Dave Monnot
G	65	Juan Porter
QB	3	Bret Powers
WR	17	Chris Sanders	Jr
TE	85	Cedric Saunders	Sr
C	69	Brian Smith
C	59	Rod Smith	Sr
WR	86	Dimitrious Stanley
OT	78	Korey Stringer	So
C	61	Jack Thrush
WR	12	Buster Tillman
RB	4	Keith Wilkerson
G	68	Jason Winrow	Sr

Defense

Pos.	#	Name	Class
DT	76	Pete Beckman
OLB	30	Greg Bellisari	Fr
DE	56	Randall Brown
NG	99	Luke Fickell	Fr
NG	92	Matt Finkes	Fr
S	26	Anthony Gwinn
DE	49	Jayson Gwinn
CB	20	Ty Howard	So
S	25	Rob Kelly	Fr
CB	46	Marlon Kerner	Jr
S	28	Jason Louis
CB	47	Dennis Maag
OLB	43	Ryan Miller	So
S	13	Chico Nelson	Sr
S	21	Tim Patillo
CB	9	Tito Paul	Jr
LB	84	Craig Powell	Jr
ILB	48	Alex Rodriguez
DE	91	Jason Simmons	Sr
OLB	32	Obie Stillwell
OLB	90	Lorenzo Styles	So
S	2	Walter Taylor	Jr
DE	94	Mike Vrabel	Fr
CB	18	Tim Walton
DT	72	Dan Wilkinson	Jr
OLB	51	Mark Williams	Sr

Special teams

Pos.	#	Name	Class
LS	50	Jim Borchers
PK	9	Josh Jackson
LS	53	Scott Lynch	Sr
H	25	David Ost
P	22	Scott Terna	Jr
PK	23	Tim Williams	Sr

Head coach

- John Cooper

Coordinators/assistant coaches

- Larry Coker (DB)
- Bill Conley (DE)
- Frank Falks (RB)
- Joe Hollis (OC)
- Ron Hudson (QB)
- Lee Owens
- Fred Pagac (LB)
- Mike Stock (WR)
- Bill Young (DC)

Legend

- (C) Team captain
- (S) Suspended
- (I) Ineligible
- Injured
- Redshirt

Roster
Last update: 2015-12-20

== 1994 NFL draftees ==
Player	Round	Pick	Position	NFL club
Dan Wilkinson	1	1	Defensive tackle	Cincinnati Bengals
Jeff Cothran	3	66	Fullback	Cincinnati Bengals
Raymont Harris	4	114	Running back	Chicago Bears
Jason Winrow	6	186	Guard	New York Giants
Butler B'ynote'	7	212	Running back	Denver Broncos
