= 1981 Ohio State Buckeyes football team =

American college football season

1981 Ohio State Buckeyes football

Big Ten co-champion Liberty Bowl champion

Liberty Bowl, W 31–28 vs. Navy
- Conference: Big Ten Conference

Ranking
- Coaches: No. 12
- AP: No. 15
- Record: 9–3 (6–2 Big Ten)
- Head coach: Earle Bruce (3rd season)
- Offensive coordinator: Glen Mason (2nd season)
- Defensive coordinator: Dennis Fryzel (3rd season)
- MVP: Art Schlichter
- Captains: Glen Cobb; Art Schlichter
- Home stadium: Ohio Stadium

1981 Big Ten Conference football standings
	Conf.					Overall
Team	W		L		T	W		L		T
No. 15 Ohio State +	6	–	2	–	0	9	–	3	–	0
No. 18 Iowa +	6	–	2	–	0	8	–	4	–	0
No. 12 Michigan	6	–	3	–	0	9	–	3	–	0
Illinois	6	–	3	–	0	7	–	4	–	0
Wisconsin	6	–	3	–	0	7	–	5	–	0
Minnesota	4	–	5	–	0	6	–	5	–	0
Michigan State	4	–	5	–	0	5	–	6	–	0
Purdue	3	–	6	–	0	5	–	6	–	0
Indiana	3	–	6	–	0	3	–	8	–	0
Northwestern	0	–	9	–	0	0	–	11	–	0
+ – Conference co-champions; Rankings from AP Poll

The 1981 Ohio State Buckeyes football team was an American football team represented the Ohio State University as a member of the Big Ten Conference during the 1981 Big Ten season. In their third season under head coach Earle Bruce, the Buckeyes compiled a 9–3 record (6–2 in conference games), tied with Iowa for the Big Ten championship, and outscored opponents by a total of 356 to 225. They concluded the season with a 31–28 victory over Navy in the 1981 Liberty Bowl.

The team's statistical leaders included:

- Quarterback Art Schlichter ranked third in the conference with 2,551 passing yards and 2,509 total yards and fifth with a 52.3 pass completion percentage.
- Running back Tim Spencer led the conference with 12 rushing touchdowns and ranked second with 1,217 rushing yards and 1,427 yards from scrimmage.
- Wide receiver Gary Williams ranked third in the conference with 50 receptions and fourth with 941 receiving yards.
- Placekicker Bob Atha led the conference with 88 points scored and 44 extra points made and ranked second with 13 field goals made and a 68.4% field goal percentage.

The team played its home games at Ohio Stadium in Columbus Ohio.

== Schedule ==
Date	Time	Opponent	Rank	Site	TV	Result	Attendance	Source
September 12	1:30 p.m.	Duke*	No. 11	Ohio Stadium; Columbus, OH		W 34–13	86,266	
September 19	1:30 p.m.	Michigan State	No. 8	Ohio Stadium; Columbus, OH		W 27–13	87,084	
September 26	4:30 p.m.	at Stanford*	No. 8	Stanford Stadium; Stanford, CA		W 24–19	76,102	
October 3	1:30 p.m.	Florida State*	No. 7	Ohio Stadium; Columbus, OH		L 27–36	87,158	
October 10	2:30 p.m.	at Wisconsin	No. 18	Camp Randall Stadium; Madison, WI		L 21–24	78,973	
October 17	1:30 p.m.	Illinois		Ohio Stadium; Columbus, OH (Illibuck)		W 34–27	87,158	
October 24	1:30 p.m.	Indiana		Ohio Stadium; Columbus, OH		W 29-10	87,182	
October 31	12:30 p.m.	at Purdue		Ross–Ade Stadium; West Lafayette, IN	ABC	W 45–33	69,927	
November 7	2:00 p.m.	at Minnesota	No. 18	Memorial Stadium; Minneapolis, MN		L 31–35	42,793	
November 14	1:30 p.m.	Northwestern		Ohio Stadium; Columbus, OH		W 70–6	86,912	
November 21	12:30 p.m.	at No. 7 Michigan		Michigan Stadium; Ann Arbor, MI (rivalry)	ABC	W 14–9	106,043	
December 30	8:00 p.m.	vs. Navy*	No. 15	Liberty Bowl Memorial Stadium; Memphis, TN (Liberty Bowl)	USA	W 31–28	43,216	
*Non-conference game; Rankings from AP Poll released prior to the game; All times are in Eastern time

== Game summaries ==
=== Michigan State ===
Team	1	2	3	4	Total
Michigan St	0	0	7	6	13
• Ohio St	7	10	0	10	27

- Date: September 12
- Location: Ohio Stadium
- Game attendance: 87,084

=== Stanford ===
Team	1	2	3	4	Total
• Ohio State	0	17	7	0	24
Stanford	3	3	0	13	19

- Date: September 26
- Location: Stanford Stadium • Palo Alto, California
- Television network: ESPN

Scoring summary
1	Stanford	Mark Harmon 25-yard field goal	Stanford 3-0
2	OSU	Shaun Gayle 1-yard run (Atha kick)	OSU 7-3
2	Stanford	Mark Harmon 39-yard field goal)	OSU 7-6
2	OSU	Robert Atha 45-yard field goal	OSU 10-6
2	OSU	Brad Dwelle 5-yard pass from Art Schlichter (Atha kick)	OSU 17-6
3	OSU	Brad Dwelle 7-yard pass from Art Schlicther (Atha kick)	OSU 24-6
4	Stanford	Donald Lonslinger 4-yard pass from John Elway (pass failed)	OSU 24-12
4	Stanford	Michael Tolliver 23-yard pass from John Elway (Harmon kick)	OSU 24-19

=== Florida State ===
Team	1	2	3	4	Total
• Florida St	10	13	13	0	36
Ohio State	7	14	0	6	27

- Date: October 3
- Location: Ohio Stadium • Columbus, Ohio
- Television network: USA

=== Wisconsin ===
Team	1	2	3	4	Total
Ohio St	7	7	0	7	21
• Wisconsin	0	17	0	7	24

- Date: October 10
- Location: Camp Randall Stadium
- Game attendance: 78,973

=== Illinois ===
Team	1	2	3	4	Total
Illinois	10	10	7	0	27
• Ohio St	21	3	7	3	34

- Date: October 17
- Location: Ohio Stadium

=== Indiana ===
Team	1	2	3	4	Total
Indiana	7	3	0	0	10
• Ohio St	3	9	14	3	29

- Date: October 24
- Location: Ohio Stadium
- Game attendance: 87,182

=== At Purdue ===
Ohio State Buckeyes (5–2) at Purdue Boilermakers (5–2)

Quarter	1	2	3	4	Total
Ohio St	0	17	7	21	45
Purdue	7	7	6	13	33

at Ross–Ade Stadium, West Lafayette, Indiana

- Date: October 31, 1981
- Game time: 12:30 p.m.
- Game weather: Partly sunny, 66 °F (19 °C)
- Game attendance: 69,927
- Referee: Jerry Hendrickson
- TV announcers (ABC): Al Michaels and Ara Parseghian
- Box Score

Team	Category	Player	Statistics
Ohio St	Passing	Art Schlichter	19/33, 336 Yds, 3 TD, INT
Ohio St	Rushing	Tim Spencer	22 Rush, 95 Yds, TD
Ohio St	Receiving	Gary Williams	7 Rec, 126 Yds
Purdue	Passing	Scott Campbell	31/52, 516 Yds, 3 TD, 2 INT
Purdue	Rushing	Jimmy Smith	11 Rush, 33 Yds
Purdue	Receiving	Steve Bryant	10 Rec, 195 Yds, 2 TD

Scoring summary

Quarter	Time	Drive			Team	Scoring information	Score	
Quarter	Time	Plays	Yards	TOP	Team	Scoring information	OSU	PU
1	3:11	10	71	3:40	Purdue	Cliff Benson 11-yard touchdown reception from Scott Campbell, Tim Clark kick good	0	7
2	11:24	6	32	2:46	Ohio St	53-yard field goal by Bob Atha	3	7
2	8:45	2	16	0:42	Ohio St	Art Schlichter 14-yard touchdown run, Bob Atha kick good	10	7
2	6:58	1	47	0:07	Ohio St	Cedric Anderson 47-yard touchdown reception from Art Schlichter, Bob Atha kick good	17	7
2	4:38	5	70	2:20	Purdue	Steve Bryant 32-yard touchdown reception from Scott Campbell, Tim Clark kick good	17	14
3	12:24	7	80	2:36	Purdue	26-yard field goal by Tim Clark	17	17
3	10:45	9	83	1:39	Ohio St	Jim Gayle 2-yard touchdown run, Bob Atha kick good	24	17
3	2:04	6	59	1:26	Purdue	38-yard field goal by Tim Clark	24	20
4	14:45	9	75	2:19	Ohio St	Tim Spencer 2-yard touchdown run, Bob Atha kick good	31	20
4	14:32	1	23	0:05	Ohio St	Cedric Anderson 23-yard touchdown reception from Art Schlichter, Bob Atha kick good	38	20
4	9:10	15	71	5:22	Purdue	Wally Jones 1-yard touchdown run, 2-point pass failed	38	26
4	7:12	2	8	0:09	Purdue	Steve Bryant 4-yard touchdown reception from Scott Campbell, Tim Clark kick good	38	33
4	2:19	5	62	1:44	Ohio St	John Frank 29-yard touchdown reception from Art Schlichter, Bob Atha kick good	45	33
"TOP" = time of possession. For other American football terms, see Glossary of American football.							45	33

=== Minnesota ===
Ohio State Buckeyes at Minnesota Golden Gophers

Quarter	1	2	3	4	Total
Ohio St	14	7	7	3	31
Minnesota	0	7	14	14	35

at Memorial Stadium, Minneapolis, Minnesota

- Date: November 7
- Game time: 1:00 p.m.
- Game weather: Clear, 64 °F (18 °C)
- Game attendance: 42,793
- Referee: Glenn Fortin
- Box Score

Game information

First quarter

- OSU – John Frank 7-yard pass from Art Schlichter (Bob Atha kick), 5:33. Ohio St 7–0. Drive: 8 plays, 76 yards.
- OSU – Tim Spencer 73-yard run (Bob Atha kick), 0:00. Ohio St 14–0. Drive: 2 plays, 80 yards, 0:10.

Second quarter

- MINN – Todd Hallstrom 1-yard pass from Mike Hohensee (Jim Gallery kick), 9:53. Ohio St 14–7. Drive: 11 plays, 80 yards, 5:07.
- OSU – Tim Spencer 2-yard run (Bob Atha kick), 7:39. Ohio St 21–7. Drive: 6 plays, 74 yards, 2:14.

Third quarter

- MINN – Jay Carroll 27-yard pass from Mike Hohensee (Jim Gallery kick), 11:25. Ohio St 21–14. Drive: 12 plays, 64 yards, 2:35.
- MINN – Frank Jacobs 17-yard pass from Mike Hohensee (Jim Gallery kick), 8:34. Tie 21–21. Drive: 4 plays, 36 yards, 1:20.
- OSU – Art Schlichter 1-yard run (Bob Atha kick), 0:30. Ohio St 28–21. Drive: 9 plays, 57 yards, 3:39.

Fourth quarter

- OSU – Bob Atha 31-yard field goal, 8:18. Ohio St 31–21. Drive: 4 plays, 27 yards, 1:13.
- MINN – Jay Carroll 18-yard pass from Mike Hohensee (Jim Gallery kick), 6:56. Ohio St 31–28. Drive: 5 plays, 68 yards, 1:23.
- MINN – Jay Carroll 28-yard pass from Mike Hohensee (Jim Gallery kick), 2:38. Minnesota 35–31. Drive: 5 plays, 40 yards, 1:03

Top passers

- OSU – Art Schlichter – 13/33, 169 yards, TD, INT
- MINN – Mike Hohensee – 37/67, 444 yards, 5 TD, INT

Top rushers

- OSU – Tim Spencer – 16 rushes, 135 yards, 2 TD
- MINN – Tony Hunter – 6 rushes, 19 yards

Top receivers

- OSU – Gary Williams – 4 receptions, 72 yards
- MINN – Chester Cooper – 12 receptions, 182 yards

=== Northwestern ===
Team	1	2	3	4	Total
Northwestern	0	6	0	0	6
• Ohio St	7	28	28	7	70

- Date: November 14
- Location: Ohio Stadium
- Game attendance: 86,916

=== Michigan ===
Team	1	2	3	4	Total
• Ohio State	0	7	0	7	14
Michigan	3	0	6	0	9

- Date: November 21
- Location: Michigan Stadium • Ann Arbor, Michigan
- Game attendance: 106,043
- TV announcers (ABC): Al Michaels and Lee Grosscup

Scoring summary
1	MICH	Ali Haji-Sheikh 19-yard field goal	MICH 3-0
2	OSU	Art Schlichter 1-yard run (Robert Atha kick)	OSU 7-3
3	MICH	Ali Haji-Sheikh 26-yard field goal	OSU 7-6
3	MICH	Ali Haji-Sheikh 24-yard field goal	MICH 9-7
4	OSU	Art Schlichter 6-yard run (Robert Atha kick)	OSU 14-9

=== Liberty Bowl ===
1981 Liberty Bowl

Team	1	2	3	4	Total
• Ohio State	10	7	7	7	31
Navy	7	6	7	8	28

- Date: December 30
- Location: Liberty Bowl • Memphis, Tennessee

== Personnel ==
=== Coaching staff ===
- Earle Bruce – Head Coach (3rd year)
- Dennis Fryzel – Defensive Coordinator (3rd year)
- Glen Mason – Offensive Coordinator (4th year)
- Bill Myles – Offensive Line (5th year)
- Nick Saban – Defensive Backs (2nd year)
- Wayne Stanley – Running Backs (3rd year)
- Steve Szabo – Defensive Line (3rd year)
- Bob Tucker – Defensive Outside Linebackers (3rd year)
- Fred Zechman – Quarterbacks/Receivers (3rd year)

=== Roster ===
1981 Ohio State Buckeyes football team roster
Players
Coaches
Offense

Pos.	#	Name	Class
QB	1	Robert Atha	Sr
QB	4	James Karsatos	Fr
QB	6	Timothy Stephens	So
QB	9	Gary Alders	Fr
QB	10	Arthur Schlichter	Sr
QB	13	Walter Norley	Fr
FB	32	Timothy Spencer	Jr
FB	38	Vaughn Broadnax	So
FB	42	Craig Dunn	Jr
TB	46	Brien Smith	Jr
C	50	James DeLeone	Sr
C	52	Bernhard Brown	Jr
C	53	Craig Pack	Jr
TB	54	Timothy O'Cain	Fr
G	56	Steven Simpson	Jr
C	58	Joseph Apke	So
C	59	Gary Burris	Jr
G	60	Richard Czyzynski	Fr
G	61	David Medich	Sr
G	63	Kirk Lowdermilk	Fr
G	67	Donte Wheat	Fr
G	69	Scott Zalenski	So
C	72	John Lucente	Fr
OT	73	Mark Krerowicz	Fr
SE	74	Gary Williams	Jr
OT	75	Rory Graves	Fr
OT	76	Steven Corbin	Jr
OT	77	James Carson	So
OT	78	Joseph Dooley	So
G	79	Michael Palahnuk	Jr
SE	80	Jeffrey McCarthy	Jr
TE	81	Brad Dowelie	Jr
TE	84	Russell Gatewood	Jr
TE	85	L. Judson Groza	So
OLB	86	Ben Lee	Sr
SE	88	Thad Jemison	So
TE	89	John Frank	So
OT	90	Joseph Smith	Jr
DT	95	Larry Phillips	Jr
DT	97	David Crecelius	Fr
MG	99	Nicholas Miller	Sr

Defense

Pos.	#	Name	Class
ROV	27	Douglas Hill	So
LB	33	Larry Kolic	Fr
CB	34	Jay Holland	Fr
LB	35	Glen Cobb	Jr
OLB	37	Orlando Lowry	So
OLB	39	Robert Manning	Sr
CB	41	Mark Eberts	Jr
CB	43	James Palmer	Fr
ROV	44	Rowland Tatum	So
CB	47	Thomas Anthony	Jr
OLB	48	Anthony Griggs	Sr
S	49	Douglas Smith	Fr
DT	57	David Morrill	Fr
DT	62	Alan Balen	Sr
OT	64	James Lachey	Fr
LB	66	Richard Czyzynski	So
DT	68	John Sullivan	Fr
OT	70	Larry Roberts	Jr
MG	71	Scott Burrows	Jr
C	72	John Lucente	Fr
OT	73	Mark Krerowicz	Fr
OT	75	Rory Graves	Fr
OT	77	James Carson	So
OT	78	Joseph Dooley	So
G	79	Michael Palahnuk	Jr
SE	80	Jeffrey McCarthy	Jr
TE	81	Brad Dowelie	Jr
OB	82	Michael Tomczak	Jr
TE	84	Russell Gatewood	Jr
TE	85	L. Judson Grola	So
OLB	86	Ben Lee	Sr
OT	87	Rory Graves	Fr
SE	88	Thad Jemison	So
TE	89	John Frank	So
OT	90	Joseph Smith	Jr
DT	91	James Gilmore	Fr
MG	92	Mark Hocevar	So
DT	93	Larry Phillips	Fr
LB	94	Joseph Berner	Jr
DT	95	Larry Phillips	Jr
DT	96	Michael D’Andrea	Sr
DT	97	David Crecelius	Fr
DE	98	Michael D’Andrea	Sr
MG	99	Nicholas Miller	Sr

Special teams

Pos.	#	Name	Class
PK	19	William Andrews	Jr
P	5	Karl Edwards	So

Head coach

- Earle Bruce

Coordinators/assistant coaches

- Glen Mason (OC)
- Dennis Fryzel (DC)
- Nick Saban (DB)

Legend

- (C) Team captain
- (S) Suspended
- (I) Ineligible
- Injured
- Redshirt

=== Depth chart ===
Defense

FS
Garcia Lane
⋅

ROLB	ILB	ILB	LOLB
Anthony Griggs	Glen Cobb	Marcus Marek	Mike D’Andrea
Ben Lee	⋅	⋅	Orlando Lowry

ROV
Doug Hill
Rowland Tatum

CB
Shaun Gayle
Jeff Cisco

DE	NT	DE
Chris Riehm	Nick Miller	Jerome Foster
⋅	Spencer Nelms	⋅

CB
Kelvin Bell
Mark Eberts

Offense

SE
Gary Williams
Thad Jemison

LT	LG	C	RG	RT
William Roberts	Scott Zalenski	Jim DeLeone	Joe Lukens	Joe Smith
Jim Lachey	⋅	Kirk Lowdermilk	⋅	Jim Carson

TE
John Frank
Brad Dwelle

FL
Cedric Anderson
⋅

QB
Art Schlichter
Mike Tomczak

FB
Vaughn Broadnax
⋅

Special teams
PK Bob Atha
P Gary Alders
P Karl Edwards

RB
Tim Spencer
Jimmy Gayle

== 1982 NFL draftees ==
Player	Round	Pick	Position	NFL club
Art Schlichter	1	4	Quarterback	Baltimore Colts
Anthony Griggs	4	105	Linebacker	Philadelphia Eagles
Bob Atha	12	317	Kicker	St. Louis Cardinals
