= Dennis Fryzel =

American football player and coach (1942–2009)

Biographical details
- Born: February 21, 1942; Garfield Heights, Ohio, U.S.
- Died: July 6, 2009 (aged 67)

Playing career
- c. 1963: Denison
- Position: Halfback

Coaching career (HC unless noted)
- 1964–1965: Garfield HS (OH)
- 1966–1967: Columbia (assistant)
- 1968–1971: Williams (DB)
- 1972: Tampa (DC)
- 1973–1974: Tampa
- 1976: Tampa Bay Buccaneers (ST)
- 1977: Syracuse (DC)
- 1978: Air Force (DC)
- 1979–1981: Ohio State (DC)

Head coaching record
- Overall: 14–8 (college)

Dennis Fryzel (February 21, 1942 – July 6, 2009) was an American football coach. He was he last head football coach at the University of Tampa. He was the captain of the football team at Garfield Heights High School, where he lost his teeth to on-the-field injuries. He attended Denison University, where he played football and ran track. Although offered a tryout by the Boston Patriots, he was unable to bulk up enough to accept. He entered the coaching ranks with jobs at his former high school, Columbia University, and Williams College, before being offered the defensive coordinator position by Tampa head coach Earle Bruce. Fryzel took over the head coaching position when Bruce was offered a job at Iowa State University the next year. Fryzel coached for two years at the University of Tampa, before the program was disbanded. Fryzel, who had become the fourth UT head coach in as many years, had given assurances on his hiring that he intended to serve out his three-year contract, and not use it to serve as a springboard to a higher-profile job. However, The University of Tampa football program was disbanded in 1976 when the NFL expansion team Tampa Bay Buccaneers arrived in Tampa. Fryzel then took the position of special teams coordinator with the expansion NFL Tampa Bay Buccaneers. After one year, he returned to the college ranks and served as defensive coordinator at Syracuse University and Air Force, before rejoining Bruce at Ohio State University. After being fired (along with Nick Saban and Steve Szabo) following the 1981 Liberty Bowl, Fryzel retired from coaching. Saban, who calls Fryzel a "great mentor" and included him on the sideline at Alabama games, credits him with helping him to make up his mind to leave the Miami Dolphins and take the University of Alabama coaching job. He died in July 2009 of renal cancer.

== Head coaching record ==
=== College ===
Year	Team	Overall	Conference	Standing	Bowl/playoffs
Tampa Spartans (NCAA Division I independent) (1973–1974)
1973	Tampa	8–3			
1974	Tampa	6–5			
Tampa:		14–8			
Total:		14–8			
