= 1981 Liberty Bowl =

- 23rd Liberty Bowl
| Ohio State Buckeyes | Navy Midshipmen |
| (8–3) | (7–3–1) |
| Big Ten | Independent |
| 31 | 28 |
| Head coach: Earle Bruce | Head coach: George Welsh |
| AP / Coaches; 15 / 14 |
| | 1 | 2 | 3 | 4 | Total |
|---|---|---|---|---|---|
| Ohio State | 10 | 7 | 7 | 7 | 31 |
| Navy | 7 | 6 | 7 | 8 | 28 |
- Date: December 30, 1981
- Season: 1981
- Stadium: Liberty Bowl Memorial Stadium
- Location: Memphis, Tennessee
- MVP: Eddie Meyers (TB, Navy)
- Favorite: Ohio State by 14
- Attendance: 43,216

United States TV coverage
- Network: USA Network/MetroSports
- Announcers: Harry Kalas, Joe Theismann, Johnny Holliday and Jeff Logan

The 1981 Liberty Bowl, a college football postseason bowl game, was played on December 30, 1981, in Memphis, Tennessee, at Liberty Bowl Memorial Stadium. The 23rd edition of the Liberty Bowl featured the Ohio State Buckeyes from the Big Ten Conference facing the independent Navy Midshipmen. Ohio State won the game, 31–28.

== Game summary ==
Scoring summary

| Quarter | Time | Drive | | | Team | Scoring information | Score | |
| Quarter | Time | Plays | Yards | TOP | Team | Scoring information | OSU | NAVY |
|---|---|---|---|---|---|---|---|---|
| 1 | | 3 | 7 | | OSU | 35-yard field goal by Bob Atha | 3 | 0 |
| 1 | | 1 | 50 | | OSU | Gary Williams 50-yard touchdown reception from Art Schlichter, Atha kick good | 10 | 0 |
| 1 | | 16 | 77 | | NAVY | Greg Papajohn 1-yard touchdown reception from Marco Pagnanelli, Steve Fehr kick good | 10 | 7 |
| 2 | | | | | NAVY | 41-yard field goal by Fehr | 10 | 10 |
| 2 | | | | | OSU | Jimmy Gayle 1-yard touchdown run, Atha kick good | 17 | 10 |
| 2 | | | | | NAVY | 23-yard field goal by Fehr | 17 | 13 |
| 3 | | | | | NAVY | Ken Olson returned blocked punt 20 yards for touchdown, Fehr kick good | 17 | 20 |
| 3 | | | 9 | | OSU | Gayle 2-yard touchdown run, Atha kick good | 24 | 20 |
| 4 | | | 5 | | OSU | Cedric Anderson 9-yard touchdown reception from Schlichter, Atha kick good | 31 | 20 |
| 4 | 0:08 | 14 | 97 | | NAVY | Papajohn 1-yard touchdown reception from Pagnanelli, 2-point pass good, Papajohn from Pagnanelli | 31 | 28 |
| "TOP" = time of possession. For other American football terms, see Glossary of American football. | | | | | | | 31 | 28 |
