= Bryant Browning =

American football player (born 1988)

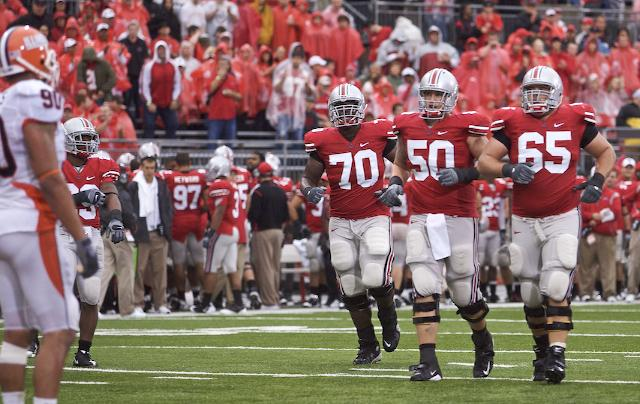
- Browning, Mike Brewster and Justin Boren come to the line of scrimmage after a time out

No. 60
- Position: Guard

Personal information
- Born: June 26, 1988 (age 38); Cleveland, Ohio, U.S.
- Listed height: 6 ft 4 in (1.93 m)
- Listed weight: 325 lb (147 kg)

Career information
- High school: Glenville (OH)
- College: Ohio State
- NFL draft: 2011: undrafted

Career history
- St. Louis Rams (2011)*; Carolina Panthers (2011–2012); Cleveland Browns (2012)*; New York Giants (2013)*; Buffalo Bills (2013)*; Pittsburgh Steelers (2013–2014); Miami Dolphins (2015)*
- * Offseason or practice squad member only

Career NFL statistics
- Games played: 1
- Stats at Pro Football Reference

Bryant Browning (born June 26, 1988) is an American former professional football player who was a guard in the National Football League (NFL). He was signed by the Carolina Panthers as an undrafted free agent in 2011. He played college football for the Ohio State Buckeyes.

== Early life ==
Bryant Browning was born to then 28 year old Valerie Browning in 1988. After Browning's mother Valerie died when he was 12 years old he went on to play football at Glenville High School. Bryant was a three star recruit going into College.

== College career ==
Bryant played College football for Ohio State where he was one of six team captains later in his college career and was a starter for three seasons. While at Ohio State, Bryant also was an Academic All-Big Ten as a freshman, sophomore and junior.

== Professional career ==
After going undrafted in the 2010 NFL draft, Browning caught on with the Carolina Panthers, whom he played for during the 2011 season.

== Personal life ==
Since being released by the Miami Dolphins in 2015, Bryant has not played in the National Football League. Recently, Browning and a former Buckeye teammate opened a restaurant; The Pit BBQ Grille in Columbus, Ohio. Bryant also runs football camps with other former Buckeyes in his life after football.
