= Mike Brewster =

American football player and coach (born 1989)

Michael Brewster
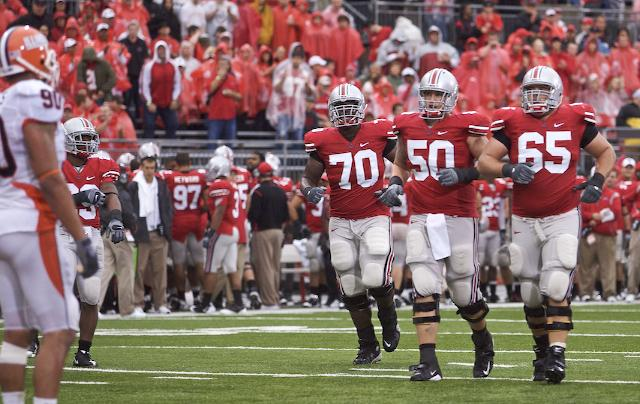
- Bryant Browning, Brewster and Justin Boren come to the line of scrimmage after a time out.

Current position
- Title: Assistant Offensive Line Coach
- Team: Washington
- Conference: Big Ten

Biographical details
- Born: July 27, 1989 (age 37); Orlando, Florida, U.S.
- Education: Ohio State (2011, B.A.); Indiana University (2021, MBA)

Playing career
- 2008–2011: Ohio State
- 2012–2013: Jacksonville Jaguars
- 2014: Miami Dolphins*
- 2014–2015: New Orleans Saints
- Position: Center/guard

Coaching career (HC unless noted)
- 2017: Orangewood Christian School (FL) (OL/DL)
- 2018: Western Michigan (GA)
- 2019: Bowling Green (GA)
- 2020: Cincinnati (Defensive Support Staff)
- 2021: Cincinnati (QC)
- 2022–2023: Tennessee State (TE)
- 2024: Valparaiso (OL)
- 2025–present: Washington (ASST. OL)

Accomplishments and honors

Awards
- As player: Jim Parker Award (2011); First-team All-American (2010); First-team All-Big Ten (2010); Second-team All-Big Ten (2011); TSN, FWAA, Rivals, CFN Freshman All-American (2008)

Michael Brewster (born July 27, 1989) is an American college football coach and former player who is the Assistant Offensive Line Coach for the Washington Huskies. He played professionally as a center and guard in the National Football League (NFL). He played college football for the Ohio State Buckeyes. Brewster was signed by the Jacksonville Jaguars as an undrafted free agent in 2012.

== High school career ==
Brewster attended Edgewater High School in Orlando, Florida, where he played both sides of the ball, and was named All-State 6A in his senior season, 2007. Brewster also earned All-American honors by USA Today, Parade, and EA Sports. Regarded as a five-star prospect by Scout.com, Brewster was listed as the #1 center in the class of 2008.

== College career ==
In his true freshman year, Brewster replaced the injured Jim Cordle at center, and his 49 consecutive starts is the second-longest streak at Ohio State and is one game shy of tying the all-time school record. He was a Freshman All-American in 2008, first-team All-Big Ten and FWAA first-team All-American in 2010, and the only junior to be a finalist for the Rimmington Trophy. In 2011, he was second-team All-Big Ten in 2011, a Rimington Trophy candidate for the 2011–12 season, was named team captain by coach Luke Fickell, and was awarded the Jim Parker Award as the team's outstanding offensive lineman.

== Professional career ==
=== 2012 NFL draft ===
According to Sports Illustrated′s Tony Pauline, Brewster "would have been the first center drafted in the 2011 NFL draft had he opted to enter." After his senior season at Ohio State, however, he was only projected as a late round pick and potential backup center. In their draft coverage, SI.com projected him as a fifth round pick.

=== Jacksonville Jaguars ===
On April 28, 2012, Brewster was signed by the Jacksonville Jaguars as an undrafted free agent. He earned his first NFL start in a game against the Indianapolis Colts in Week 3 of the 2012 season. He was placed on injured reserve on December 11, 2012, after breaking his left hand. Brewster was placed on injured reserve on December 16, 2013 after fracturing his left ankle. The Jaguars released Brewster on August 29, 2014.

=== Miami Dolphins ===
Brewster was signed to the Miami Dolphins' practice squad on November 11, 2014. He was released by the Dolphins on December 23, 2014.

=== New Orleans Saints ===
Brewster was signed to the New Orleans Saints' practice squad on December 26, 2014. He signed a futures contract with the Saints on December 29, 2014.

He participated in The Spring League in 2017.

== Coaching career ==
Brewster began coaching high school football in 2017, at Lake Highland Prep and Orangewood Christian School.

Brewster joined Western Michigan and Bowling Green for the 2018 and 2019 season respectively as a graduate assistant.

Brewster then reuninted with former Ohio State football coach Luke Fickell at Cincinnati, beginning in 2020 on the defensive staff before shifting to offense in 2021.

In March 2022, Brewster was hired as the tight ends coach at Tennessee State, working for former Ohio State great Eddie George.

Brewster was hired as the offensive line coach for Valparaiso.
