= Cedric Saunders =

American football player and executive (born 1972)

No. 49, 85
- Position: Tight end

Personal information
- Born: September 30, 1972 (age 54); Tallahassee, Florida, U.S.
- Listed height: 6 ft 3 in (1.91 m)
- Listed weight: 240 lb (109 kg)

Career information
- High school: Sarasota (Sarasota, Florida)
- College: Ohio State (1990–1993)
- NFL draft: 1994: undrafted

Career history

Playing
- Tampa Bay Buccaneers (1995); Scottish Claymores (1997)

Operations
- Kansas City Chiefs (1999–2000) Area scout; Tampa Bay Buccaneers (2001–2005) Director of player development; Detroit Lions (2006) Assistant to the head coach / football operations; Detroit Lions (2007–2014) Vice president of football operations; Detroit Lions (2015) Senior vice president of football operations

Career NFL statistics
- Games played: 3
- Stats at Pro Football Reference

Cedric Randall Saunders (born September 30, 1972) is the vice president of Goal Line Football.

== Football career ==
Saunders attended the Ohio State University and was a four-year starter there as a receiver and posted 68 career receptions for a total of 853 yards. As a senior in 1993, he recorded 27 catches and earned second-team All-Big 10 honors; he was honorable mention selection as a junior. Saunders went along to play pro with the Tampa Bay Buccaneers, he spent three seasons in training camp from (1994–96) and saw action on both the practice squad and the active roster as a tight end in 1995. He also played with the Scottish Claymores of NFL Europe in 1997.

== Family ==
Saunders and his wife, Bashi, have four children together: two daughters, Reegan and CharlieBleu, and two sons, Cayden and Kai.

== Occupation history ==
In 1999-2000, he became an area scout for the Kansas City Chiefs, and then a director of player development in 2001-05 for the Tampa Bay Buccaneers. He joined the Detroit Lions in 2006 and has moved up in the administration. He eventually served as senior vice president of football operations, until he was fired in January 2016. Saunders is now an NFLPA Certified Contract Advisor and vice president at Goal Line Football.
