= Jason Winrow =

American football player (1971–2012)

Profile
- Position: Offensive guard

Personal information
- Born: January 16, 1971; Bridgeton, New Jersey, U.S.
- Died: September 23, 2012 (aged 41); Westerville, Ohio, U.S.
- Listed height: 6 ft 8 in (2.03 m)
- Listed weight: 321 lb (146 kg)

Career information
- High school: Cumberland Regional (Seabrook, New Jersey)
- College: Ohio State
- NFL draft: 1994: 6th round, 186th overall pick

Career history
- New York Giants (1994–1996)

Awards and highlights
- First-team All-Big Ten (1993)

Jason Howard Winrow (January 16, 1971 – September 23, 2012) was an American football offensive guard. He played college football at Ohio State from 1989 to 1993. Winrow was a sixth round draft pick by the New York Giants in the 1994 NFL draft.

After several seasons on NFL teams' practice squads, Winrow returned to Westerville, Ohio, and went into private business. He died on September 23, 2012, in his home.
