= Alan Kline =

American football player (born 1971)

No. 76, 68
- Position: Offensive tackle

Personal information
- Born: May 25, 1971 (age 55); Tiffin, Ohio, U.S.
- Listed height: 6 ft 5 in (1.96 m)
- Listed weight: 290 lb (132 kg)

Career information
- High school: Columbian (Tiffin)
- College: Ohio State (1990–1993)
- NFL draft: 1994: undrafted

Career history
- New Orleans Saints (1994–1995); → Rhein Fire (1995); New York Giants (1997)*
- * Offseason or practice squad member only

Awards and highlights
- First-team All-Big Ten (1991)
- Stats at Pro Football Reference

Alan Nathan Kline (born May 25, 1971) is an American former professional football player who was an offensive tackle for one season with the New Orleans Saints of the National Football League (NFL). He played college football for the Ohio State Buckeyes.

== Early life and college ==
Alan Nathan Kline was born on May 25, 1971, in Tiffin, Ohio. He attended Columbian High School in Tiffin.

Kline was a member of the Ohio State Buckeyes from 1990 to 1993. He was named first-team All-Big Ten by the Associated Press his sophomore year in 1991. He started 37 games during his college career.

== Professional career ==
After going undrafted in the 1994 NFL draft, Kline signed with the New Orleans Saints on May 2. He was released on August 28 and signed to the Saints' practice squad on August 30. He was promoted to the active roster on December 22, 1994, but did not play in any games for the team during the 1994 season. In 1995, Kline was allocated to the World League of American Football (WLAF) to play for the Rhein Fire during the 1995 WLAF season. He later appeared in three games for the Saints during the 1995 NFL season. He was released on August 25, 1996.

Kline was signed by the New York Giants on March 20, 1997. He was released on August 11, 1997.
