= Matt Finkes =

American football player (born 1975)

No. 51, 50, 54
- Position: Defensive end

Personal information
- Born: February 12, 1975 (age 51); Piqua, Ohio, U.S.
- Listed height: 6 ft 3 in (1.91 m)
- Listed weight: 272 lb (123 kg)

Career information
- High school: Piqua (Piqua, Ohio)
- College: Ohio State
- NFL draft: 1997: 6th round, 189th overall pick

Career history
- Carolina Panthers (1997)*; New York Jets (1997); Scottish Claymores (1999); Washington Redskins (1999)*; Scottish Claymores (2000); Jacksonville Jaguars (2000)*; Chicago Enforcers (2001)
- * Offseason or practice squad member only

Awards and highlights
- Third-team All-American (1994); 2× First-team All-Big Ten (1994, 1996); Second-team All-Big Ten (1995)
- Stats at Pro Football Reference

Matthew Scott Finkes (born February 12, 1975) is an American former professional football defensive end who played in the National Football League (NFL) for the New York Jets in 1997. He was selected in the sixth round of the 1997 NFL draft with the 189th overall pick.
