= Tito Paul =

American football player (born 1972)

No. 27, 28
- Position: Cornerback

Personal information
- Born: May 24, 1972 (age 54); Kissimmee, Florida, U.S.
- Listed height: 6 ft 0 in (1.83 m)
- Listed weight: 195 lb (88 kg)

Career information
- High school: Osceola (Kissimmee)
- College: Ohio State
- NFL draft: 1995: 5th round, 167th overall pick

Career history
- Arizona Cardinals (1995–1997); Cincinnati Bengals (1997); Denver Broncos (1998); Washington Redskins (1999)

Awards and highlights
- Super Bowl champion (XXXIII)

Career NFL statistics
- Tackles: 109
- Fumble recoveries: 3
- Interceptions: 1
- Stats at Pro Football Reference

Tito Jermaine Paul (born May 24, 1972) is an American former professional football player who was a cornerback in the National Football League (NFL) for the Arizona Cardinals, Cincinnati Bengals, Denver Broncos, and Washington Redskins. He won Super Bowl XXXIII with the Broncos. He played college football for the Ohio State Buckeyes and was selected in the fifth round of the 1995 NFL draft.

Paul is an insurance agent in Delaware, Ohio.
