= Butler B'ynote' =

American football player (born 1972)

No. 28, 33
- Position: Running back

Personal information
- Born: September 29, 1972 (age 54); St. Louis, Missouri, U.S.
- Listed height: 5 ft 9 in (1.75 m)
- Listed weight: 190 lb (86 kg)

Career information
- High school: Vashon (St. Louis)
- College: Ohio State
- NFL draft: 1994: 7th round, 212th overall pick

Career history
- Denver Broncos (1994); Carolina Panthers (1995); Barcelona Dragons (1997); New England Patriots (1997)*; Oakland Raiders (1998)*; Orlando Predators (2000); New York/New Jersey Hitmen (2001); Colorado Crush (2003)
- * Offseason or practice squad member only

Awards and highlights
- World Bowl champion (1997); Arena Bowl champion (2000)

Career NFL statistics
- Games played: 16
- Games started: 0
- Kick returns: 42
- Return yards: 880
- Touchdowns: 0
- Stats at Pro Football Reference
- Stats at ArenaFan.com

Butler B'ynote' (born September 29, 1972) is an American former professional football player who was a running back in the National Football League (NFL). He played college football for the Ohio State Buckeyes, and professionally for the Denver Broncos, Carolina Panthers, Barcelona Dragons, Orlando Predators, New York/New Jersey Hitmen and Colorado Crush. He was selected in the seventh round of the 1994 NFL draft by the Broncos. He ran on Ohio State's 4 × 400 metres relay team that set an NCAA record. During his playing career, he went by the spelling By'not'e because Ohio State misspelled it and he never corrected it.

B'ynote' worked at Madison Christian School in Groveport, Ohio as a computer teacher. He also served as on-air talent for the Big Ten Network football broadcasts in 2007. B'ynote' coached track at Centennial High School. B'ynote' first became a head football coach in 2012 at Briggs High School (Columbus, Ohio). In two years, Briggs went 2–18. B'ynote' taught and coached track at Sumner High School in St. Louis. B'ynote' also served as head football coach at his alma mater, Vashon High School from 2017 to 2018, compiling a 5–16 record. B'ynote' was replaced by another Vashon alum, Will Franklin. B'ynote' is an ordained reverend in the African Methodist Episcopal Zion Church and started a ministry, Nu Nazion.

B'ynote' is currently the head coach for Westminster Christian Academy (Missouri) in Town & Country, Missouri.
