= Mark Williams (American football) =

American football player (born 1971)

No. 51, 56, 58
- Position: Linebacker

Personal information
- Born: May 17, 1971 (age 55); Camp Springs, Maryland, U.S.
- Listed height: 6 ft 3 in (1.91 m)
- Listed weight: 243 lb (110 kg)

Career information
- High school: Bishop McNamara
- College: Ohio State
- NFL draft: 1994: undrafted
- Expansion draft: 1995: 6th round, 11th overall pick

Career history
- Green Bay Packers (1994); Jacksonville Jaguars (1995); St. Louis Rams (1996); Tampa Bay Buccaneers (1996)

Career NFL statistics
- Tackles: 37
- Fumble recoveries: 1
- Stats at Pro Football Reference

Mark Anthony Williams (born May 17, 1971) is an American former professional football player who was a linebacker for three seasons in the National Football League (NFL) with the Green Bay Packers, Jacksonville Jaguars, St. Louis Rams, and Tampa Bay Buccaneers. He played college football for the Ohio State Buckeyes. He was a starter in the NFL with the Jaguars in 1995, starting 12 games before being injured.
