= Steve Szabo =

American football player and coach (born 1943)

Biographical details
- Born: September 11, 1943 (age 83)

Playing career

Football
- 1961–1964: Navy
- 1965: Quantico Marines

Lacrosse
- 1963–1965: Navy
- Positions: Fullback, defensive back (football); Midfielder (lacrosse)

Coaching career (HC unless noted)

Football
- 1969: Johns Hopkins (DC/DB)
- 1970: Toledo (freshmen)
- 1971–1973: Iowa (ST/LB)
- 1974–1976: Syracuse (DL)
- 1977–1978: Iowa State (DL/K)
- 1979–1981: Ohio State (DL/K)
- 1982–1984: Western Michigan (asst. HC / OC)
- 1985–1987: Edinboro
- 1988: Northern Iowa (DL)
- 1989–1990: Colorado State (DC/LB)
- 1991–1993: Boston College (DC/LB)
- 1994–2002: Jacksonville Jaguars (LB)
- 2003: New England Patriots (volunteer)
- 2004–2005: Buffalo Bills (DB)
- 2006–2007: Michigan (LB)
- 2008: Colgate (DC/LB)
- 2009: Eastern Michigan (assoc. HC/LB)
- 2011: Illinois State (DC/LB)

Head coaching record
- Overall: 15–15–1

Steve Szabo (born September 11, 1943) is an American former football player and coach. He played football and lacrosse for the United States Naval Academy from 1961 to 1965. After four years of military service, Szabo held coaching positions with 18 collegiate and professional football teams from 1969 to 2011. He served as the head football coach at Edinboro University of Pennsylvania from 1985 to 1987, compiling a record of 15–15–1.

== Early years ==
A native of Chicago, Illinois, Szabo graduated from Mendel High School in Chicago. He subsequently attended the United States Naval Academy, graduating in 1965. While attending the Naval Academy, Szabo played college football from 1961 to 1964 and played as a midfielder on Navy's national championship lacrosse teams from 1963 to 1965. He played as fullback and defensive back on the same Navy football teams with Roger Staubach. After graduating from the Naval Academy, Szabo served four years in the United States Marine Corps. He was stationed at Marine Corps Base Quantico and served one year in South Vietnam. He played for the Quantico Marines football team in 1965.

== Coaching career ==
Between 1969 and 2011, Szabo held coaching positions with 18 collegiate and professional football teams. These include Johns Hopkins Blue Jays (defensive coordinator and defensive backfield, 1969), Toledo Rockets (freshman coach and chief scout, 1970), Iowa Hawkeyes (special teams and linebackers, 1971–1973), Syracuse Orange (defensive line, 1974–1976), Iowa State Cyclones (defensive line and kickers, 1977–1978), Ohio State Buckeyes (defensive line and kickers, 1979–1981), Western Michigan Broncos (assistant head coach and offensive coordinator, 1982–1984), Edinboro Fighting Scots (head coach, 1985–1987), Northern Iowa Panthers (defensive line, 1988), Colorado State Rams (defensive coordinator and linebackers, 1989–1990), Boston College Eagles (defensive coordinator and linebackers, 1991–1993), Jacksonville Jaguars (linebackers, 1994–2002), New England Patriots (volunteer assistant, 2003), Buffalo Bills (defensive backs, 2004–2005), Michigan Wolverines (linebackers, 2006–2007), Colgate Raiders (defensive coordinator and linebackers, 2008), Eastern Michigan Eagles (associate head coach and linebackers, 2009), and Illinois State Redbirds (defensive coordinator and linebackers, 2011), Szabo resigned his position at Illinois State in June 2011 for personal reasons.

== Head coaching record ==
Year	Team	Overall	Conference	Standing	Bowl/playoffs
Edinboro Fighting Scots (Pennsylvania State Athletic Conference) (1985–1987)
1985	Edinboro	5–4–1	3–3	T–3rd (West)	
1986	Edinboro	7–3	5–1	2nd (West)	
1987	Edinboro	3–8	1–5	6th (West)	
Edinboro:		15–15–1	9–9		
Total:		15–15–1			
