= Jeff Cothran =

American football player (born 1971)

No. 46, 29
- Position: Fullback

Personal information
- Born: June 28, 1971 (age 55); Middletown, Ohio, U.S.
- Listed height: 6 ft 1 in (1.85 m)
- Listed weight: 249 lb (113 kg)

Career information
- High school: Middletown
- College: Ohio State
- NFL draft: 1994: 3rd round, 66th overall pick

Career history
- Cincinnati Bengals (1994–1996); Philadelphia Eagles (1998)*; Orlando Predators (1999–2000); Detroit Fury (2001); Florida Bobcats (2001)
- * Offseason or practice squad member only

Awards and highlights
- ArenaBowl champion (2000)

Career NFL statistics
- Rushing yards: 191
- Rushing average: 3.4
- Touchdowns: 2
- Stats at Pro Football Reference

Career AFL statistics
- Rushing yards: 65
- Tackles: 12
- Fumble recoveries: 1
- Stats at ArenaFan.com

Jeffrey Lance Cothran (born June 28, 1971) is an American former professional football player who was a fullback in the National Football League (NFL) and Arena Football League (AFL). He played for the Cincinnati Bengals, Orlando Predators, Detroit Fury and Florida Bobcats. He was selected 66th overall by the Bengals in the third round of the 1994 NFL draft.
