= Gary Williams (American football) =

American football player (born 1959)

No. 84
- Position: Wide receiver

Personal information
- Born: September 4, 1959 (age 67); Wilmington, Ohio, U.S.
- Listed height: 6 ft 2 in (1.88 m)
- Listed weight: 215 lb (98 kg)

Career information
- High school: Wilmington
- College: Ohio State
- NFL draft: 1983: 11th round, 304th overall pick

Career history
- Cincinnati Bengals (1984)

Awards and highlights
- 2× Second-team All-Big Ten (1981, 1982)
- Stats at Pro Football Reference

Gary Leon Williams (born September 4, 1959) is an American former professional football player who was a wide receiver for the Cincinnati Bengals of the National Football League (NFL). He played college football for the Ohio State Buckeyes. He holds the record for most consecutive games with a catch at 48 (as of December 7, 2019, KJ Hill was at 47 with the potential to tie or break the record).
