= Bob Atha =

American football player (1960–2026)

Profile
- Position: Kicker

Personal information
- Born: September 22, 1960; Marietta, Ohio, U.S.
- Died: March 31, 2026 (aged 65); Worthington, Ohio, U.S.
- Listed height: 5 ft 11 in (1.80 m)
- Listed weight: 180 lb (82 kg)

Career information
- High school: Thomas Worthington
- College: Ohio State (1978–1981)
- NFL draft: 1982: 12th round, 317th overall pick

Career history
- St. Louis Cardinals (1982)*; Los Angeles Express (1983)*; Miami Dolphins (1983)*
- * Offseason or practice squad member only

Robert Atha (September 22, 1960 – March 31, 2026) was an American football placekicker, punter and quarterback who played college football for the Ohio State Buckeyes.

== Biography ==
From 1978 to 1980, Atha played for the Buckeyes as a backup to the quarterback Art Schlichter and the placekicker Vlade Janakievski. In 1981, Atha earned the starting position as placekicker. He continued as a backup quarterback behind Mike Tomczak. Atha led the team in scoring that year with 88 points: 13 field goals, 43 PATs and one touchdown. He earned the key to Worthington, Ohio, for his achievements. After his years of Ohio football, he got drafted to the NFL's St. Louis Cardinals.

During an October 24, 1981, game in Ohio Stadium, Atha made five field goals to set an Ohio State school and stadium record. The record has not been surpassed but it has been tied by Mike Nugent (at North Carolina State on September 19, 2004) and Josh Huston (vs. 2005 Texas Longhorns football team on September 17, 2005, in Ohio Stadium). It was most recently tied on September 11, 2010, by Devin Barclay versus the University of Miami.

Atha was married to Carol Atha and had a daughter named Lauren Atha Skinner, and two sons, Hunter and Tanner Atha. He was the owner of Houghton Investments, an oilfield production company in Ohio. Atha died from cancer at his home in Worthington, Ohio, on March 31, 2026, at the age of 65.
