= 1980 in Michigan =

- Decades: 1960s; 1970s; 1980s; 1990s; 2000s
- See also: History of Michigan; Historical outline of Michigan; List of years in Michigan; 1980 in the United States

Events from the year 1980 in Michigan.

The Associated Press (AP) selected the top Michigan news stories in Michigan as follows:

1. Record losses by the Big Three automakers and layoffs of 190,000 workers by year's end and production falling below the Japanese auto makers for the first time in history;
2. Economic downturn in Michigan resulting in layoffs of state employees, increases in welfare rolls, and reductions in state services;
3. A radical tax-cutting proposal from Shiawassee County Drain Commissioner Robert Tisch, known as the Tisch Amendment, was defeated in the November general election;
4. Chrysler Corporation's struggle to avoid bankruptcy, including $1.47 billion in losses in the first nine months, the introduction of the K car, and its pursuit of additional federal loan guarantees;
5. The 1980 Republican National Convention in Detroit nominating Ronald Reagan as its presidential nominee;
6. The 1980 Kalamazoo tornado of May 13 that killed five persons and injured 80;
7. A compromise over oil drilling in the Pigeon River Country State Forest with new drilling to be permitted in the forest, but under heightened environmental safeguards;
8. The City of Detroit's challenge to the 1980 United States census, including a federal court ruling that the count was deficient by five million, mostly African American and Hispanic, persons;
9. Charles Diggs' resignation from Congress and the start of his prison sentence after his 1978 conviction in a payroll kickback scheme; and
10. The continuing debate over Indian fishing rights and the United States Department of the Interior's restriction on the use of gill nets in the upper Great Lakes.

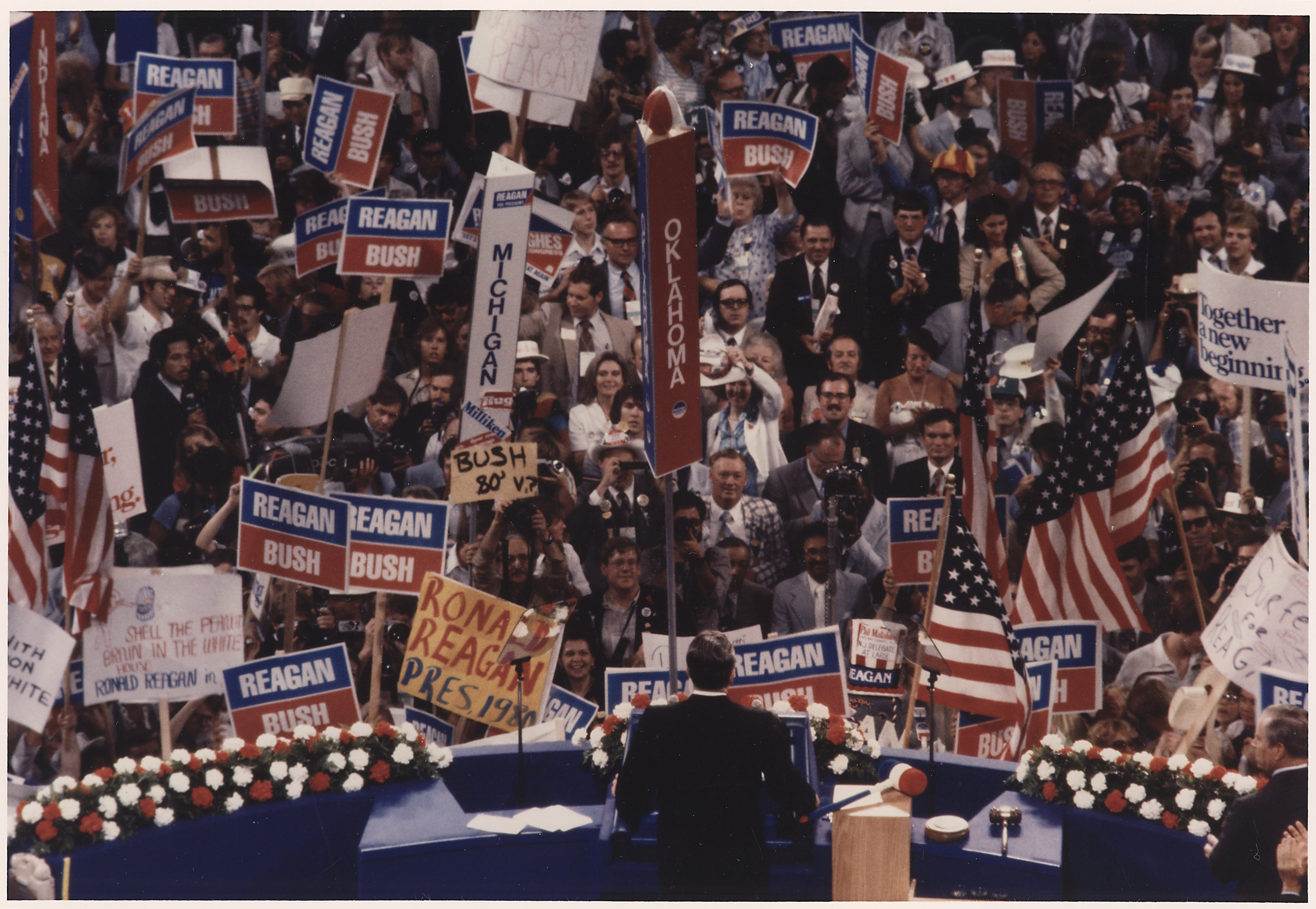
Ronald Reagan at Republican National Convention in Detroit

Also receiving extensive press coverage in Detroit was a controversy over General Motors' plan, supported by local government, to use eminent domain to remove 1,500 homes and 150 businesses to build a new assembly plant in Hamtramck and Poletown.

The AP also selected the state's top sports stories as follows:

1. The Detroit Lions' selection of Oklahoma Heisman Trophy winner Billy Sims as the first overall pick in the 1980 NFL draft and signing him to a three-year, $1.7 million contract;
2. Al Kaline's induction into the Baseball Hall of Fame, the 10th player in history selected on the first ballot;
3. The 1980 Michigan Wolverines football team's compiling a 10–2 record and winning the Big Ten Conference championship;
4. Thomas Hearns of Kronk Gym winning WBA welterweight boxing championship;
5. Joe Kearny and Darryl Rogers quitting Michigan State;
6. The 1980 Detroit Lions' starting the season with four wins but then losing seven of the last 12 games;
7. Michigan State's hiring of Muddy Waters as its head football coach;
8. The Detroit Pistons' trading Bob Lanier on February 4 to the Milwaukee Bucks in exchange for Kent Benson and a 1980 first round draft pick;
9. The hiring Bill Frieder as head coach of the Michigan Wolverines men's basketball team after Johnny Orr left for Iowa State; and
10. The Detroit Red Wings' firing of Ted Lindsay as general manager and Bobby Kromm as head coach.

The year's highlights in Michigan music included Bob Seger's Against the Wind reaching #1 on the album charts, the debut of The Romantics with the song "What I Like About You", and hit singles by Stevie Wonder ("Master Blaster (Jammin')"), Diana Ross ("Upside Down"), and The Spinners ("Working My Way Back to You").

== Office holders ==
=== State office holders ===
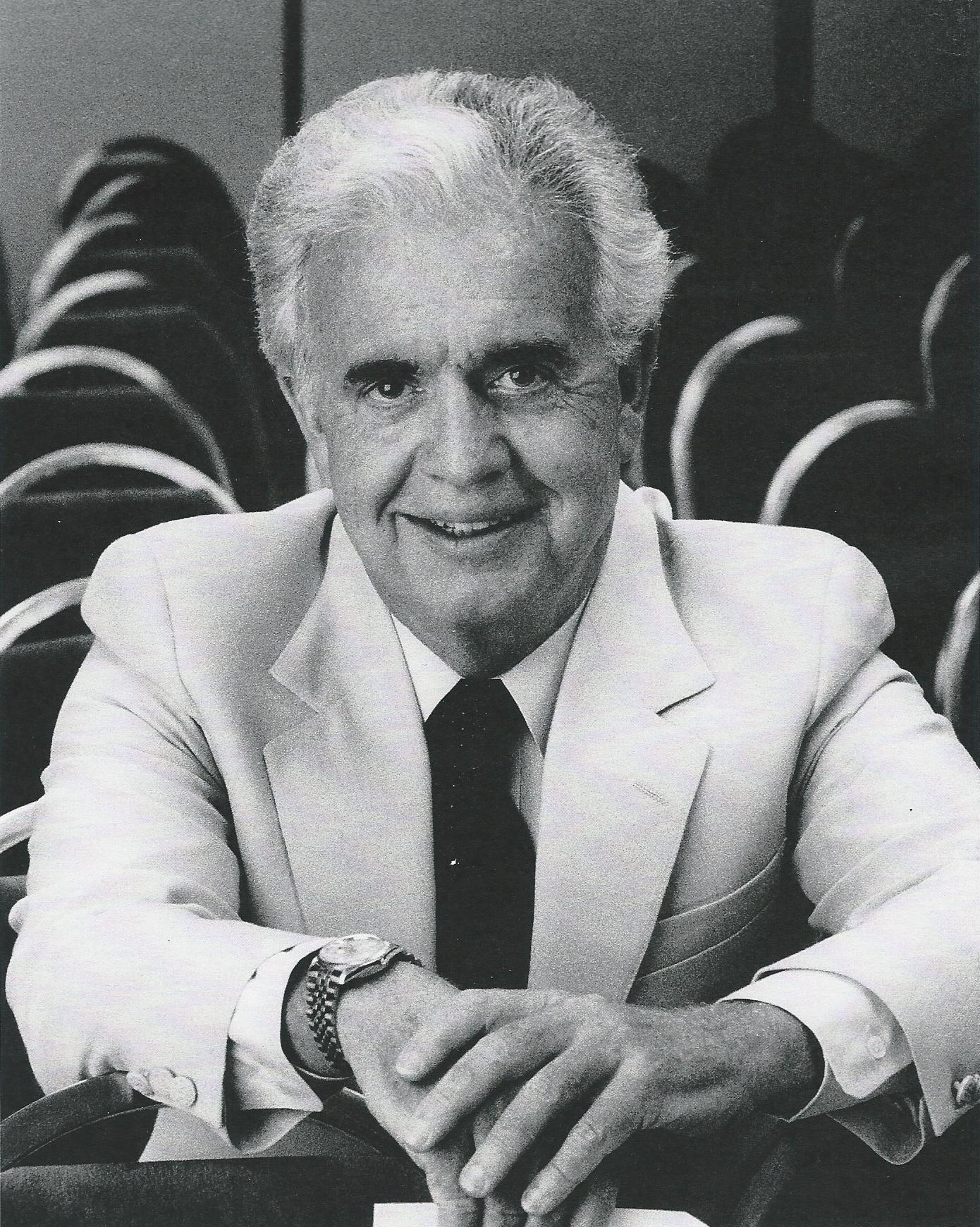
Frank J. Kelley

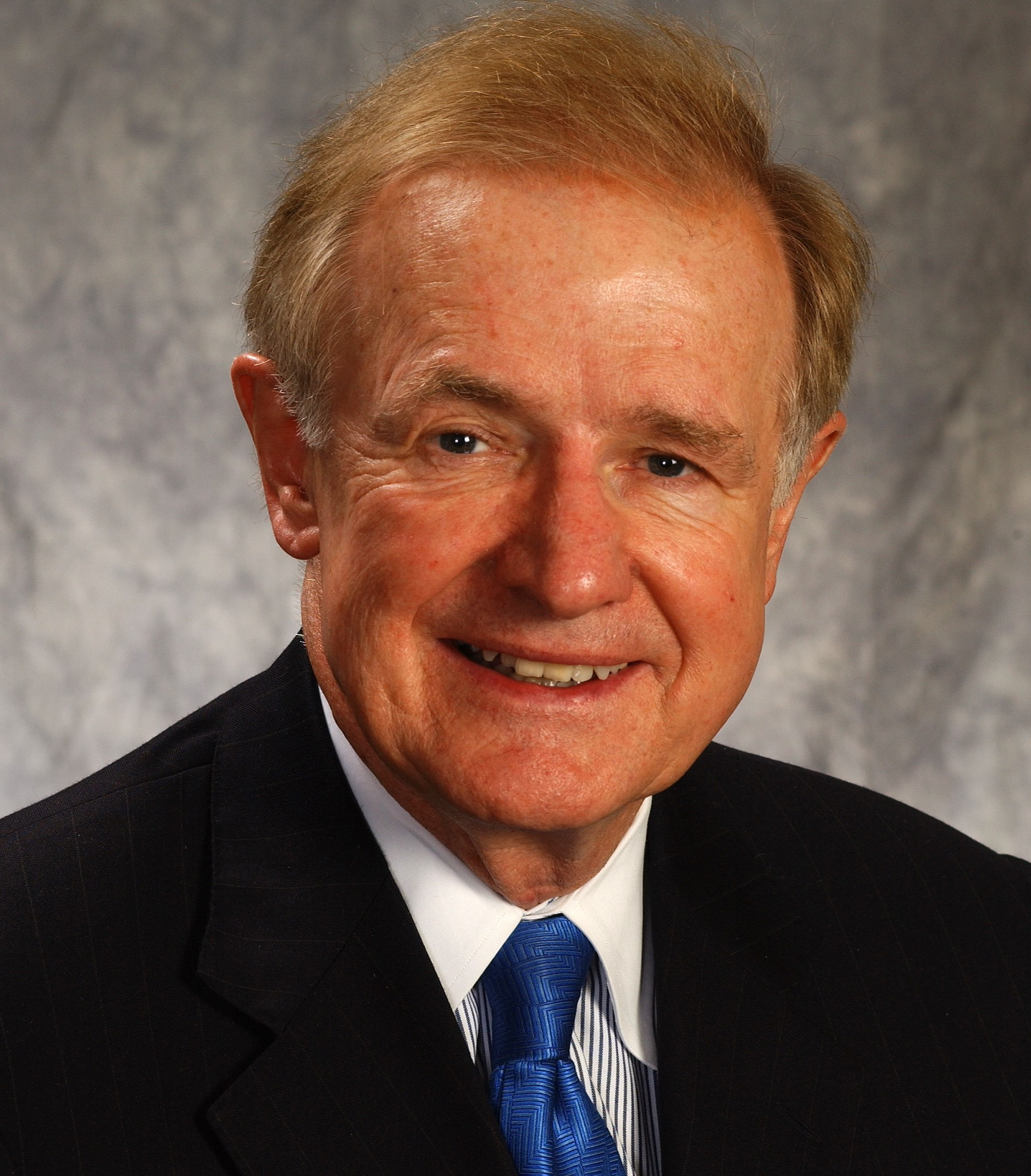
Donald Riegle

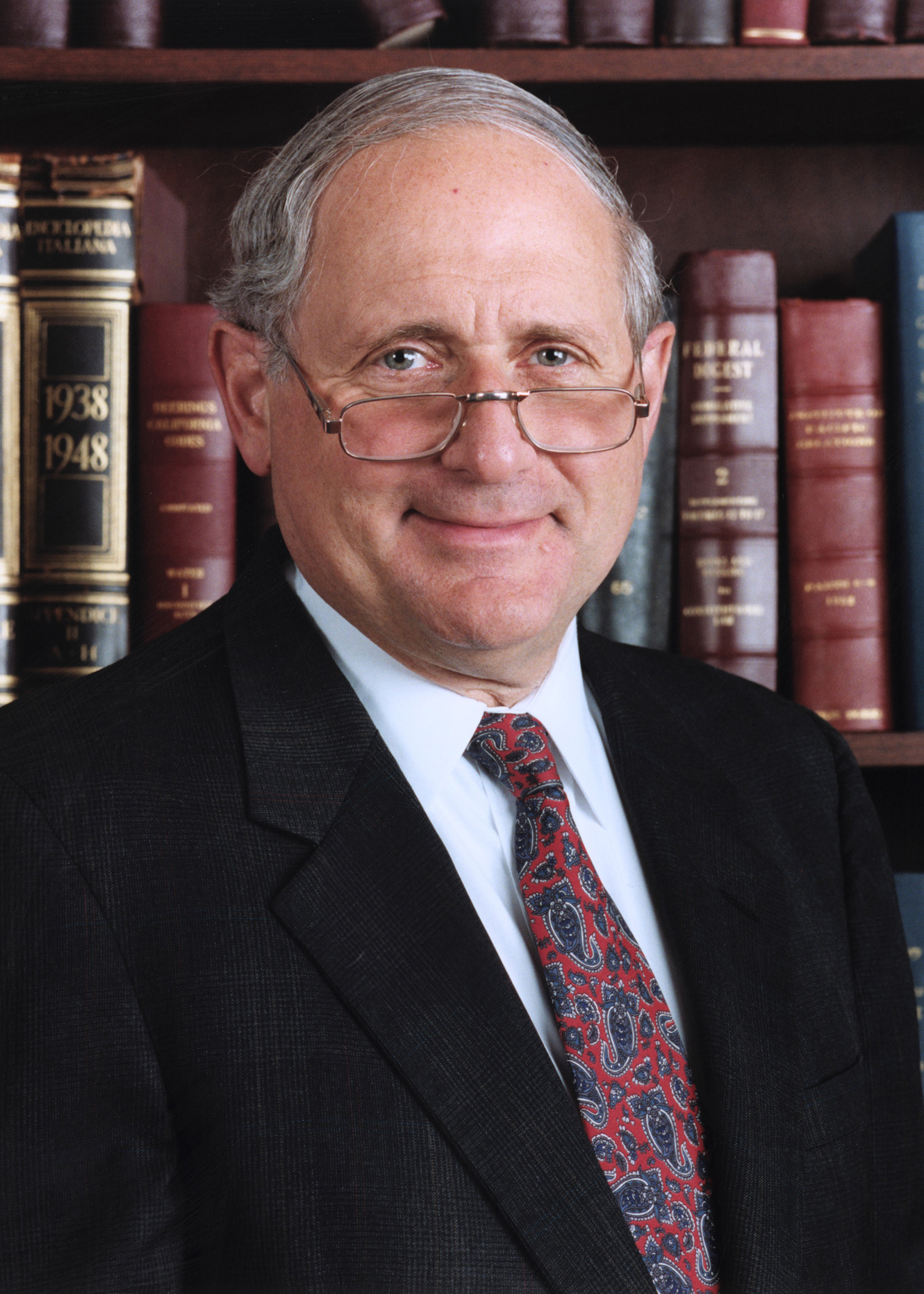
Carl Levin

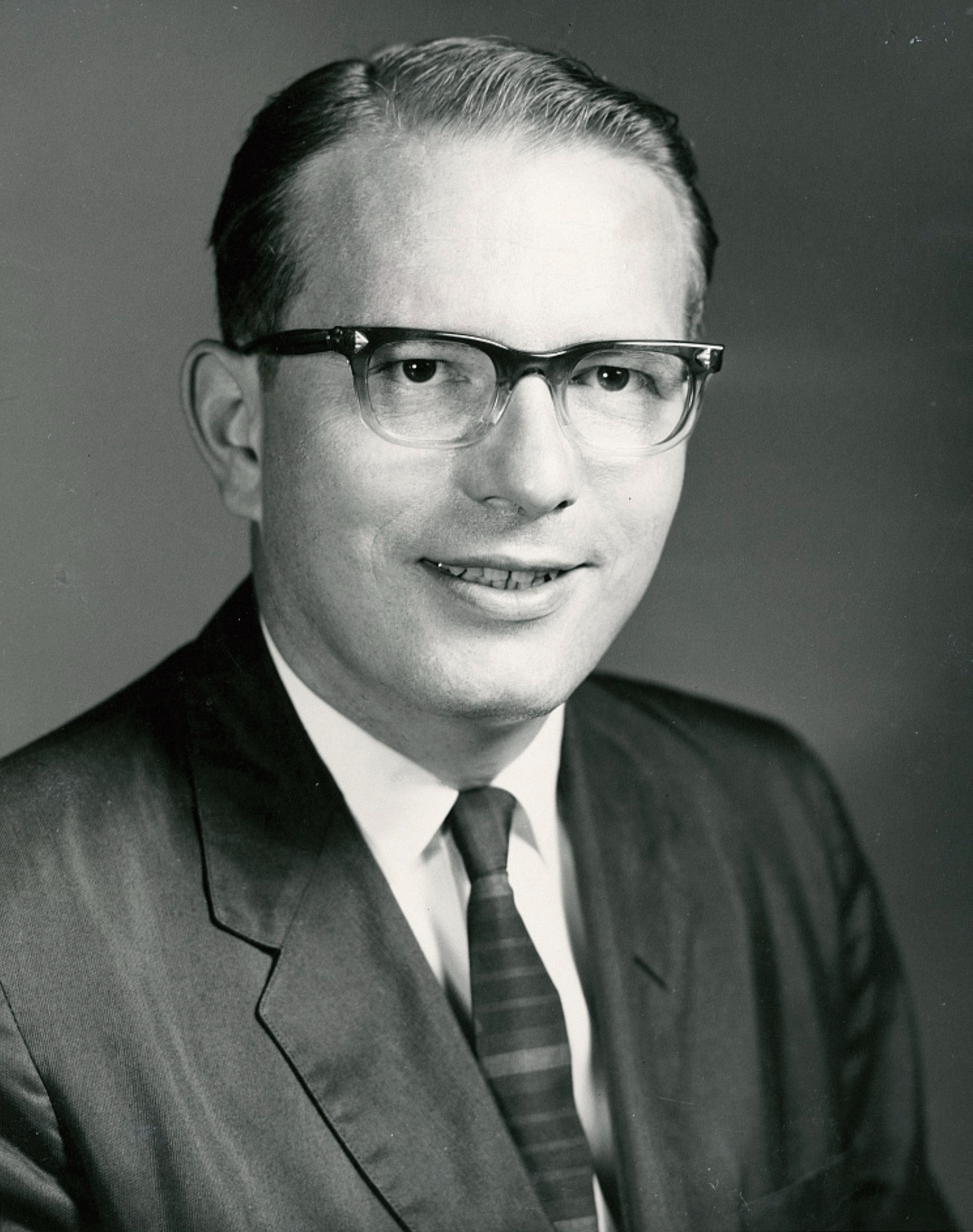
Guy Vander Jagt

- Governor of Michigan: William Milliken (Republican)
- Lieutenant Governor of Michigan: James H. Brickley (Republican)
- Michigan Attorney General: Frank J. Kelley (Democrat)
- Michigan Secretary of State: Richard H. Austin (Democrat)
- Speaker of the Michigan House of Representatives: Bobby Crim (Democrat)
- Majority Leader of the Michigan Senate: William Faust (Democrat)
- Chief Justice, Michigan Supreme Court: Mary S. Coleman

=== Mayors of major cities ===
- Mayor of Detroit: Coleman Young
- Mayor of Grand Rapids: Abe L. Drasin
- Mayor of Warren, Michigan: Ted Bates
- Mayor of Sterling Heights, Michigan: Anthony Dobry
- Mayor of Flint: James W. Rutherford
- Mayor of Dearborn: John O'Reilly, Sr.
- Mayor of Lansing: Gerald W. Graves
- Mayor of Ann Arbor: Louis Belcher (Republican)
- Mayor of Saginaw: Paul P. Prudhomme

=== Federal office holders ===
- U.S. Senator from Michigan: Donald W. Riegle Jr. (Democrat)
- U.S. Senator from Michigan: Carl Levin (Democrat)
- House District 1: John Conyers (Democrat)
- House District 2: Carl Pursell (Republican)
- House District 3: Howard Wolpe (Republican)
- House District 4: David Stockman (Republican)
- House District 5: Harold S. Sawyer (Republican)
- House District 6: Bob Carr (Democrat)
- House District 7: Dale Kildee (Democrat)
- House District 8: J. Bob Traxler (Democrat)
- House District 9: Guy Vander Jagt (Republican)
- House District 10: Donald J. Albosta (Democrat)
- House District 11: Robert William Davis (Republican)
- House District 12: David Bonior (Democrat)
- House District 13: Charles Diggs (Democrat)/George Crockett Jr. (Democrat)
- House District 14: Lucien N. Nedzi (Democrat)
- House District 15: William D. Ford (Democrat)
- House District 16: John Dingell (Democrat)
- House District 17: William M. Brodhead (Democrat)
- House District 18: James Blanchard (Democrat)
- House District 19: William Broomfield (Republican)

== Population ==
In the 1980 United States census, Michigan was recorded as having a population of 9,259,000 persons, ranking as the eighth most populous state in the country. By 1990, the state's population had grown only marginally by 0.4% to 9,259,000 persons.

=== Cities ===
The following is a list of cities in Michigan with a population of at least 50,000 based on 1980 U.S. Census data. Historic census data from 1970 and 1990 is included to reflect trends in population increases or decreases. Cities that are part of the Detroit metropolitan area are shaded in tan.

1980 Rank	City	County	1970 Pop.	1980 Pop.	1990 Pop.	Change 1980-90
1	Detroit	Wayne	1,514,063	1,203,368	1,027,974	−14.6% ▼
2	Grand Rapids	Kent	197,649	181,843	189,126	4.0% ▲
3	Warren	Macomb	179,260	161,134	144,864	−10.1% ▼
4	Flint	Genesee	193,317	159,611	140,761	−11.8% ▼
5	Lansing	Ingham	131,403	130,414	127,321	−2.4% ▼
6	Sterling Heights	Macomb	61,365	108,999	117,810	8.1% ▲
7	Ann Arbor	Washtenaw	100,035	107,969	109,592	1.5% ▲
8	Livonia	Wayne	110,109	104,814	100,850	−3.8% ▼
9	Dearborn	Wayne	104,199	90,660	89,286	−1.5%▼
10	Westland	Wayne	86,749	84,603	84,724	0.1% ▲
11	Kalamazoo	Kalamazoo	85,555	79,722	80,277	0.7% ▲
12	Taylor	Wayne	70,020	77,568	70,811	−8.7% ▼
13	Saginaw	Saginaw	91,849	77,508	69,512	−10.3% ▼
14	Pontiac	Oakland	85,279	76,715	71,166	−7.2% ▼
15	St. Clair Shores	Macomb	88,093	76,210	68,107	−10.6% ▼
16	Southfield	Oakland	69,298	75,608	75,745	0.2% ▲
17	Royal Oak	Oakland	86,238	70,893	65,410	−7.7% ▼
18	Dearborn Heights	Wayne	80,069	67,706	60,838	−10.1% ▼
19	Troy	Oakland	39,419	67,102	72,884	8.6% ▲
20	Wyoming	Kent	56,560	59,616	63,891	7.2% ▲
21	Farmington Hills	Oakland	--	58,056	74,611	28.5% ▲
22	Roseville	Macomb	60,529	54,311	51,412	−5.3% ▼
23	East Lansing	Ingham	47,540	51,392	50,677	−1.4% ▼

=== Counties ===
The following is a list of counties in Michigan with populations of at least 100,000 based on 1980 U.S. Census data. Historic census data from 1970 and 1990 are included to reflect trends in population increases or decreases. Counties that are part of the Detroit metropolitan area are shaded in tan.

1980 Rank	County	Largest city	1970 Pop.	1980 Pop.	1990 Pop.	Change 1980-90
1	Wayne	Detroit	2,666,751	2,337,891	2,111,687	−9.7% ▼
2	Oakland	Pontiac	907,871	1,011,793	1,083,592	7.1% ▲
3	Macomb	Warren	625,309	694,600	717,400	3.3% ▲
4	Genesee	Flint	444,341	450,449	430,459	−4.4% ▼
5	Kent	Grand Rapids	411,044	444,506	500,631	12.6% ▲
6	Ingham	Lansing	261,039	275,520	281,912	2.3% ▲
7	Washtenaw	Ann Arbor	234,103	264,748	282,937	6.9% ▲
8	Saginaw	Saginaw	219,743	228,059	211,946	−7.1% ▼
9	Kalamazoo	Kalamazoo	201,550	212,378	223,411	5.2% ▲
10	Berrien	Benton Harbor	163,875	171,276	161,378	−5.8% ▼
11	Muskegon	Muskegon	157,426	157,589	158,983	0.9% ▲
12	Ottawa	Holland	128,181	157,174	187,768	19.5% ▲
13	Jackson	Jackson	143,274	151,495	149,756	−1.1% ▼
14	Calhoun	Battle Creek	141,963	141,557	135,982	−3.9% ▼
15	St. Clair	Port Huron	120,175	138,802	145,607	4.9% ▲
16	Monroe	Monroe	118,479	134,659	133,600	−0.8% ▼
17	Bay	Bay City	117,339	119,881	111,723	−6.8% ▼
18	Livingston	Howell	58,967	100,289	115,645	15.3% ▲

== Companies ==
The following is a list of major companies based in, or having a substantial manufacturing presence in, Michigan in 1980.

Fortune 500 Rank (1981)	Company	1980 sales (millions)	1980 net earnings (millions)	Headquarters	Nature of business
3	General Motors	57,728.5	-762.5	Detroit	One of the "Big Three" automobile manufacturers
6	Ford Motor Company	37,085.5	-1,543.3	Dearborn	One of the "Big Three" automobile manufacturers
na	Kmart	14,200.0	260.5	Troy	Retail stores
25	Dow Chemical Co.	10,626.0	805.0	Midland	Chemicals
32	Chrysler	9,225.3	-1,709.7	Detroit	One of the "Big Three" automobile manufacturers
87	Bendix Corporation	4,270.4	191.6	Southfield	Auto parts, aerospace and electronic equipment and machine tools
115	Eaton Corporation	3,176.5	115.8	Cleveland, OH	Automobile parts
137	Burroughs	2,857.2	82.0	Detroit	Computers and data processing machines (later became Unisys)
155	American Motors	2,552.6	-197.5	Southfield	Automobiles
na	Consumers Power	2,300.0	224.0	Jackson	Electric and natural gas utility
170	Whirlpool Corporation	2,243.2	101.7	Benton Harbor	Washers, dryers, appliances
176	Kellogg's	2,150.9	184.8	Battle Creek	Cereal
180	Fruehauf Trailer Co.	2,081.7	32.2	Detroit	Truck trailers
na	Upjohn	1,800.0	170.1	Kalamazoo	Pharmaceuticals
na	Detroit Edison	1,800.0	137.5	Detroit	Electric utility
226	Clark Equipment Co.	1,533.7	53.5	Buchanan	Industrial and construction machinery
297	Ex-Cell-O	1,020.7	50.4	Troy	Industrial equipment
377	Federal-Mogul	721.2	36.7	Detroit	Bearings and replacement parts for autos, trucks, and aircraft
427	McLouth Steel	614.0	-56.6	Detroit	Steel producer for auto industry
434	Gerber Products	602.0	29.7	Fremont	Baby food

== Sports ==
=== Baseball ===
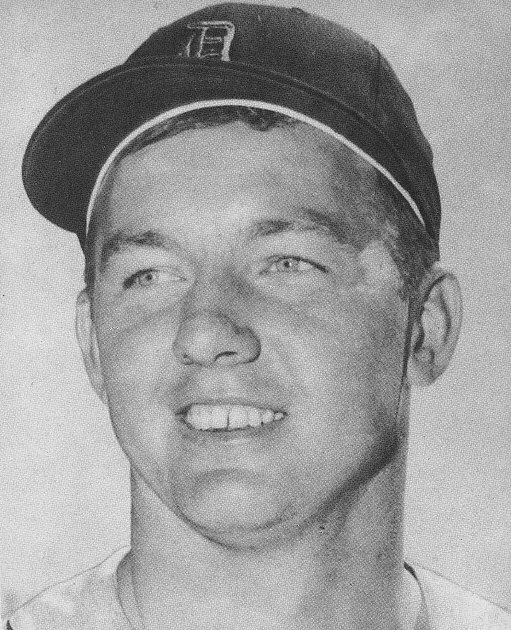
Al Kaline

- 1980 Detroit Tigers season – The Tigers compiled an 84–78 record and finished in a tie for fourth place in the American League East under manager Sparky Anderson. The team's statistical leaders included Lance Parrish (24 home runs), Steve Kemp (101 RBIs), Alan Trammell (.300 batting average), and Jack Morris (16 wins).
- Al Kaline – On January 9, Al Kaline was elected to the Baseball Hall of Fame, the tenth player in history to be elected on the first ballot after becoming eligible. The induction ceremony took place in Cooperstown on August 3. On August 17, the Tigers retired Kaline's jersey (No. 6) before 42,117 fans at Tiger Stadium. Kaline was the first player to have his number retired by the Tigers.
- 1980 Michigan Wolverines baseball team - Under head coach Bud Middaugh, the Wolverines compiled a 36–18–1 record, won the Big Ten Conference championship, and finished fifth at the 1980 College World Series. George Foussianes was the team captain.

=== American football ===
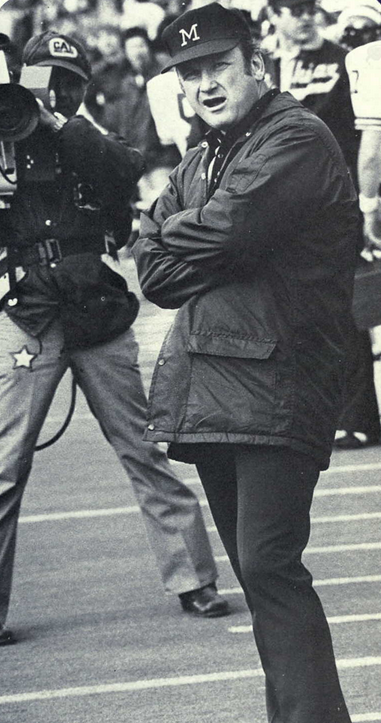
Bo Schembechler

- 1980 Detroit Lions season – The Lions compiled a 9–7 record under head coach Monte Clark and finished in second place in the NFC Central. The team's statistical leaders included Billy Sims with 1,303 rushing yards, Gary Danielson with 3,223 passing yards, Freddie Scott with 834 receiving yards, and Eddie Murray with 116 points scored.
- 1980 Michigan Wolverines football team – The Wolverines compiled a 10–2 record under head coach Bo Schembechler, won the Big Ten championship and defeated Washington in the 1981 Rose Bowl. The team's statistical leaders included John Wangler with 1,522 passing yards, Butch Woolfolk with 1,042 rushing yards, and Anthony Carter with 818 receiving yards and 84 points scored. Carter and center George Lilja were selected as first-team All-Americans.
- 1980 Michigan State Spartans football team – The Spartans compiled a 3–8 record under head coach Muddy Waters. Morten Anderson, who went on to a Hall of Fame career in the NFL, was the team's place-kicker.
- 1980 Central Michigan Chippewas football team – The Chippewas compiled a 9–2 record and won the Mid-American Conference championship under head coach Herb Deromedi.
- 1980 Eastern Michigan Hurons football team – The Hurons compiled a 1–9 record under head coach Mike Stock.
- 1980 Western Michigan Broncos football team – The Broncos compiled a 7–4 record under head coach Elliot Uzelac.
- Class A Michigan high school football championship – Birmingham Brother Rice defeated Dearborn Fordson, 6–0, in the state championship game, played at the Pontiac Silverdome on November 29.

=== Basketball ===
- 1979–80 Detroit Pistons season – The Pistons compiled a 16–66 record under head coaches Dick Vitale and Richie Adubato. The team's statistical leaders included John Long with 1,337 points scored, Bob Lanier with 21.7 points per game before being traded, Eric Money led with 238 assists, and Terry Tyler with 627 rebounds.
- 1979–80 Michigan Wolverines men's basketball team – The Wolverines compiled a 17–13 record under head coach Johnny Orr. Mike McGee was selected as the team's most valuable player.
- 1979–80 Michigan State Spartans men's basketball team – After winning the national championship with Magic Johnson in the lineup the previous year, the 1979–80 Spartans compiled a 12–15 record under head coach Jud Heathcote. Jay Vincent was the team's leading scorer.
- 1979–80 Detroit Titans men's basketball team – The Titans compiled a 14–13 record under head coach Willie McCarter.

=== Ice hockey ===
- 1979–80 Detroit Red Wings season – The Red Wings compiled a 26–43–11 record under head coaches Bobby Kromm and Ted Lindsay in the team's first season playing in Joe Louis Arena. The team's statistical leaders included Mike Foligno with 36 goals and Dale McCourt with 51 assists and 81 points. Goaltender Rogie Vachon led the NHL in losses (30) and goals allowed (209).

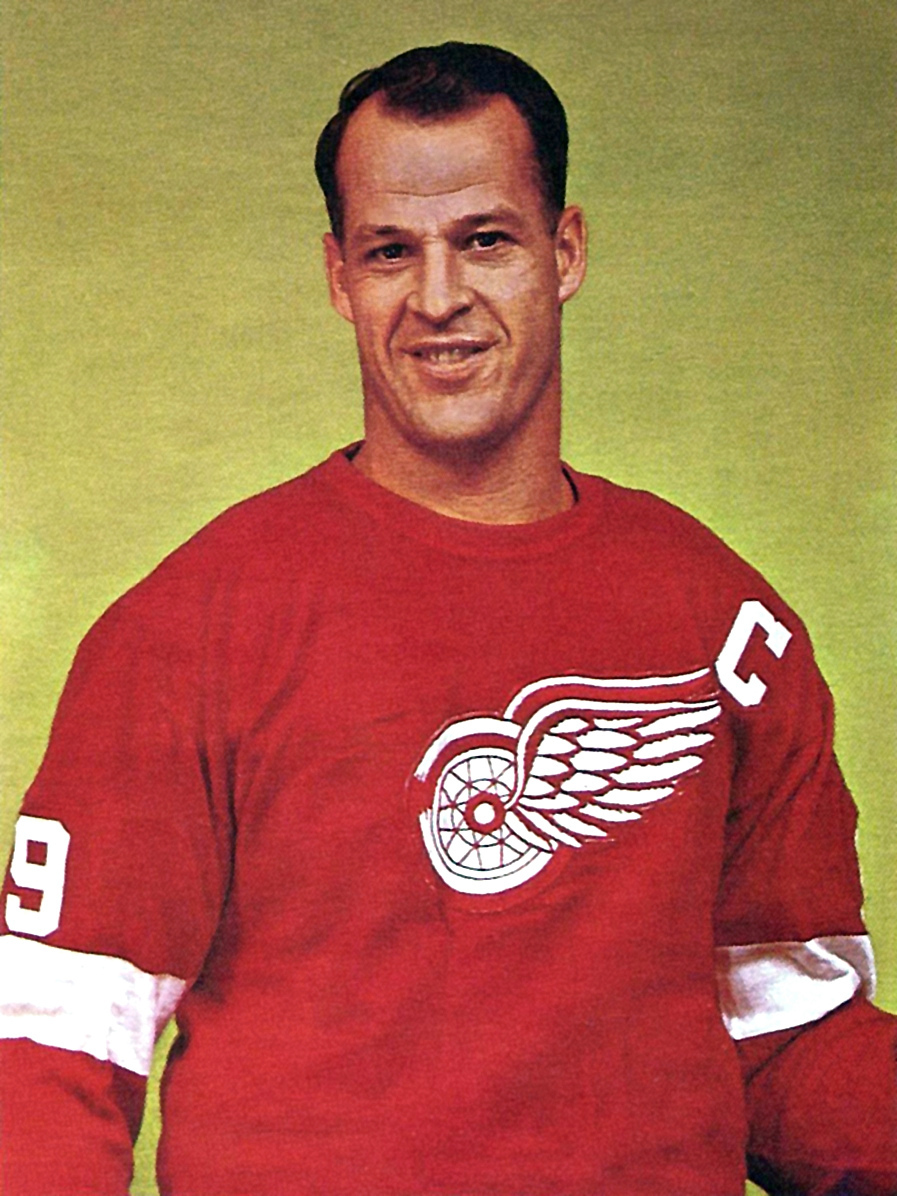
Gordie Howe

- 32nd National Hockey League All-Star Game – The game was played on February 5 at Joe Louis Arena in Detroit. The game drew a crowd of 21,002 persons, the largest crowd to watch a professional hockey game to that date. The crowd gave Gordie Howe a two-and-a-half minute standing ovation before the game and another ovation when he assisted on a goal.
- 1979–80 Northern Michigan Wildcats men's ice hockey team – Michigan Tech advanced to the 1980 NCAA Division I Men's Ice Hockey Tournament. The team lost to North Dakota in the national championship game by a 5–2 score. Northern Michigan finished its season with a 34–6–1 record under head coach Rick Comley.
- 1979–80 Michigan Wolverines men's ice hockey team – The Wolverines compiled a 23–13–2 record under head coach Dan Farrell.
- 1979–80 Michigan State Spartans men's ice hockey team – The Spartans compiled a 14–24 record in their first season under head coach Ron Mason.
- 1979–80 Michigan Tech Huskies men's ice hockey team – The Huskies compiled an 18–18–2 record under head coach John MacInnes.

=== Boxing ===
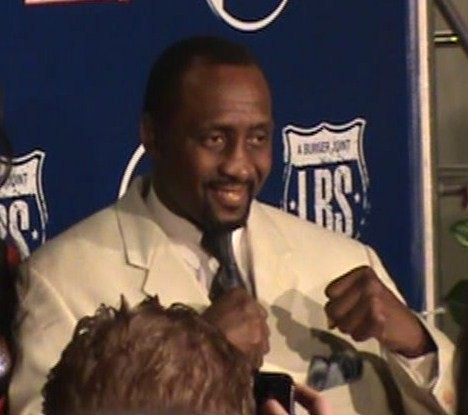
Thomas Hearns

- March 2 – Hilmer Kenty defeated Ernesto España at Joe Louis Arena to win the World Boxing Association (WBA) lightweight championship. He became Detroit's first world champion boxer since Joe Louis. On the same card, Thomas Hearns knocked out Angel Espada, and Mickey Goodwin knocked out Leo Saenz. Kenty, Hearns, and Goodwin were all trained by Emanuel Steward of the Kronk Gym.
- August 2 – Thomas Hearns defeated Pipino Cuevas by a technical knockout in the second round before a crowd of 14,000 at Joe Louis Arena to win the WBA welterweight championship.

=== Other ===
- 1980 Detroit Express soccer season – The Detroit Express of the North American Soccer League compiled a 14–18 in 1980 under manager Ken Furphy and attracted an average attendance of 11,198 at the Pontiac Silverdome. The team's leading players included Pato Margetic, Ivan Belfiore, and Dave McGill. Keith Furphy was traded to the Atlanta Chiefs on May 2. Trevor Francis was out of action with a ruptured Achilles tendon.
- 1980 NCAA Indoor Track and Field Championships – The meet was held at Cobo Arena in Detroit. UTEP won the team championship. Michigan placed ninth.
- 1980 Avon Championships of Detroit – Billie Jean King defeated Evonne Goolagong to win the singles title at Cobo Arena.
- Buick Open – Peter Jacobsen won the tournament, his first PGA title, at 12 under par.
- Port Huron to Mackinac Boat Race – Sundance, captained by Dan and Greg McQueen, won the race on July 22 with a corrected time of 44 hours, 9 minutes.
- Spirit of Detroit Regatta – Dean Chenoweth in the Miss Budweiser won the annual hydroplane race on the Detroit River on June 30.
- Detroit Free Press International Marathon – Greg Meyer, a native of Grand Rapids who had previously been a middle-distance runner, won the event on October 29 in his first time competing in a marathon. His time of 2:13:08 broke the American record for a first-time marathon participant.

== Music and culture ==
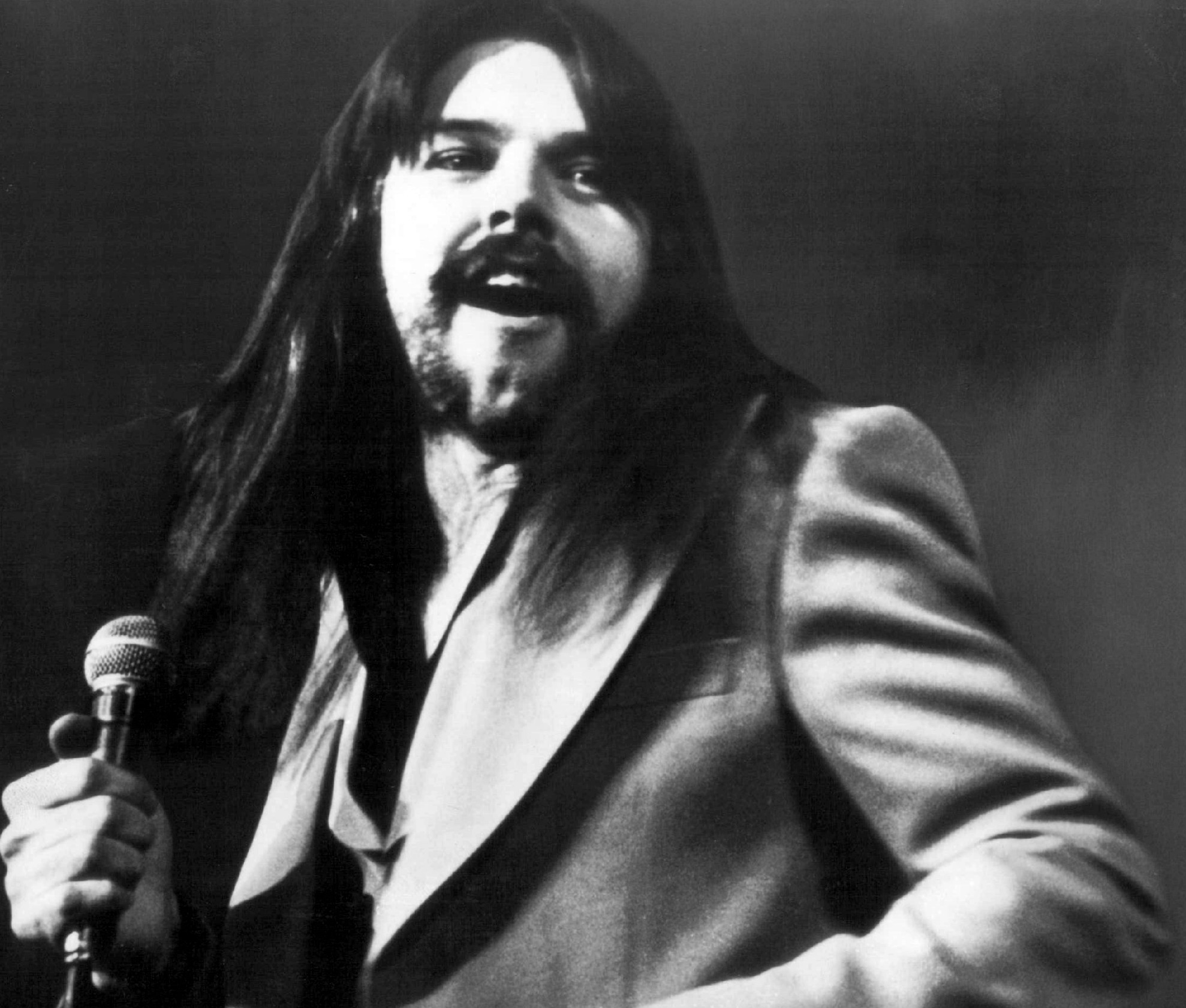
Bob Seger

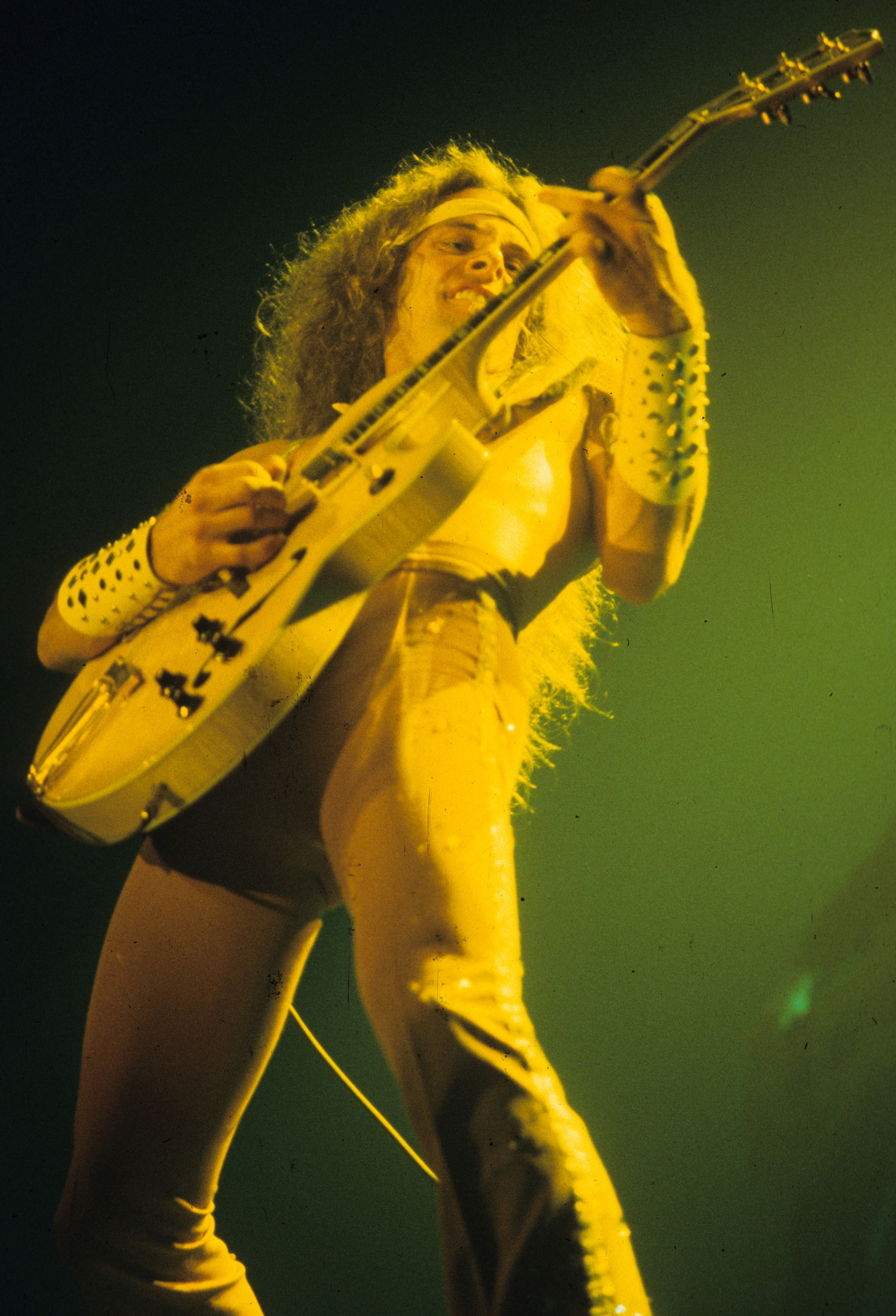
Ted Nugent

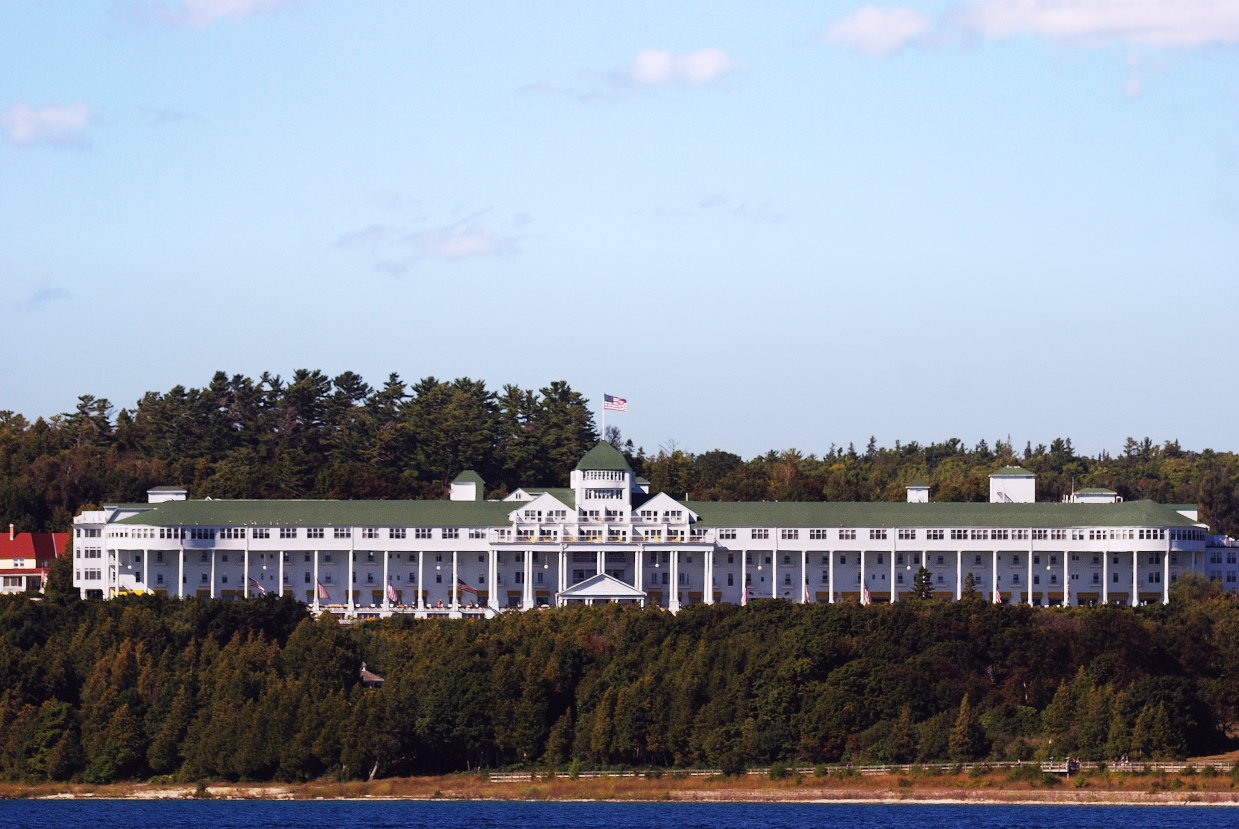
Grand Hotel, location for Somewhere in Time

- January 4 – The Romantics from Detroit released their debut album The Romantics, including the hit "What I Like About You".
- February 15 – The Knack led by Oak Park native Doug Fieger released its ...But the Little Girls Understand album. The RIAA certified the album as Gold on April 14, 1980.
- February 25 – Bob Seger released his album, Against the Wind, his only #1 album; it replaced Pink Floyd's The Wall at the #1 spot. Hit singles from the album included "Against the Wind", "You'll Accomp'ny Me", and "Fire Lake".
- February 25 – Smokey Robinson released his Warm Thoughts album. The single "Let Me Be the Clock" reached the Top 40. The album reached #4 at the R&B album chart.
- February – Iggy Pop released his Soldier album.
- March – The Spinners' remake of "Working My Way Back to You", released in December 1979, reached #2 on the Billboard Hot 100.
- March 24 – "The Gospel Show of the Decade", a benefit for C. L. Franklin, who had been in a coma since he was shot in July 1979, took place at Cobo Arena. Aretha Franklin, who had not played a show in Detroit in years, headlined the event. The Staples Singers, Jesse Jackson, Jackson Southernaires, Donald Vails, James Cleveland, and Cleophus Robinson also appeared at the show.
- April 28 – Alice Cooper released his Flush the Fashion album. The single "Clones (We're All)" reached #40 on the U.S. singles chart.
- May 21 – The Empire Strikes Back, with a screenplay by Detroit native Lawrence Kasdan, opened in the United States. Kasdan also wrote the screenplay for Raiders of the Lost Ark, released in 1981.
- May 22 – Diana Ross released her album Diana. The single "Upside Down" reached #1 on the Billboard Hot 100 in September.
- June – Ted Nugent released his Scream Dream album which included the song "Wango Tango".
- June – Bob Seger played six shows at Cobo Arena in Detroit.
- August 28–September 1 – The first Montreaux-Detroit Jazz Festival was held in downtown Detroit.
- September

* Magnum, P.I. starring Detroit native Tom Selleck debuted on CBS.
* Mork & Mindy starring Robin Williams, the son of a Ford Motor executive who grew up in suburban Detroit, entered its third season. Williams also appeared in the film Popeye which debuted in December.

- September 29 – Stevie Wonder released his Hotter than July album. The single "Master Blaster (Jammin')" reached #1 in December.
- October 3 – Somewhere in Time, filmed on location at the Grand Hotel and the Mission Point Fine Arts building, both located on Mackinac Island, debuted.
- October 25 – Aretha Franklin released her Aretha album. The single "United Together" reached #3 on the Soul chart.
- October – Suzi Quatro released her Rock Hard album.
- November 12 - After a dispute with the board in September over funding for the Detroit Symphony Orchestra (DSO), Antal Doráti announced that he would leave the DSO as its musical director at the end of the season and become the conductor laureate.

== Chronology of events ==
=== January ===
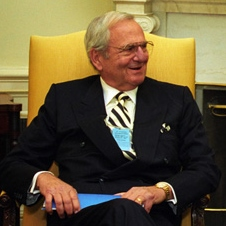
Lee Iacocca

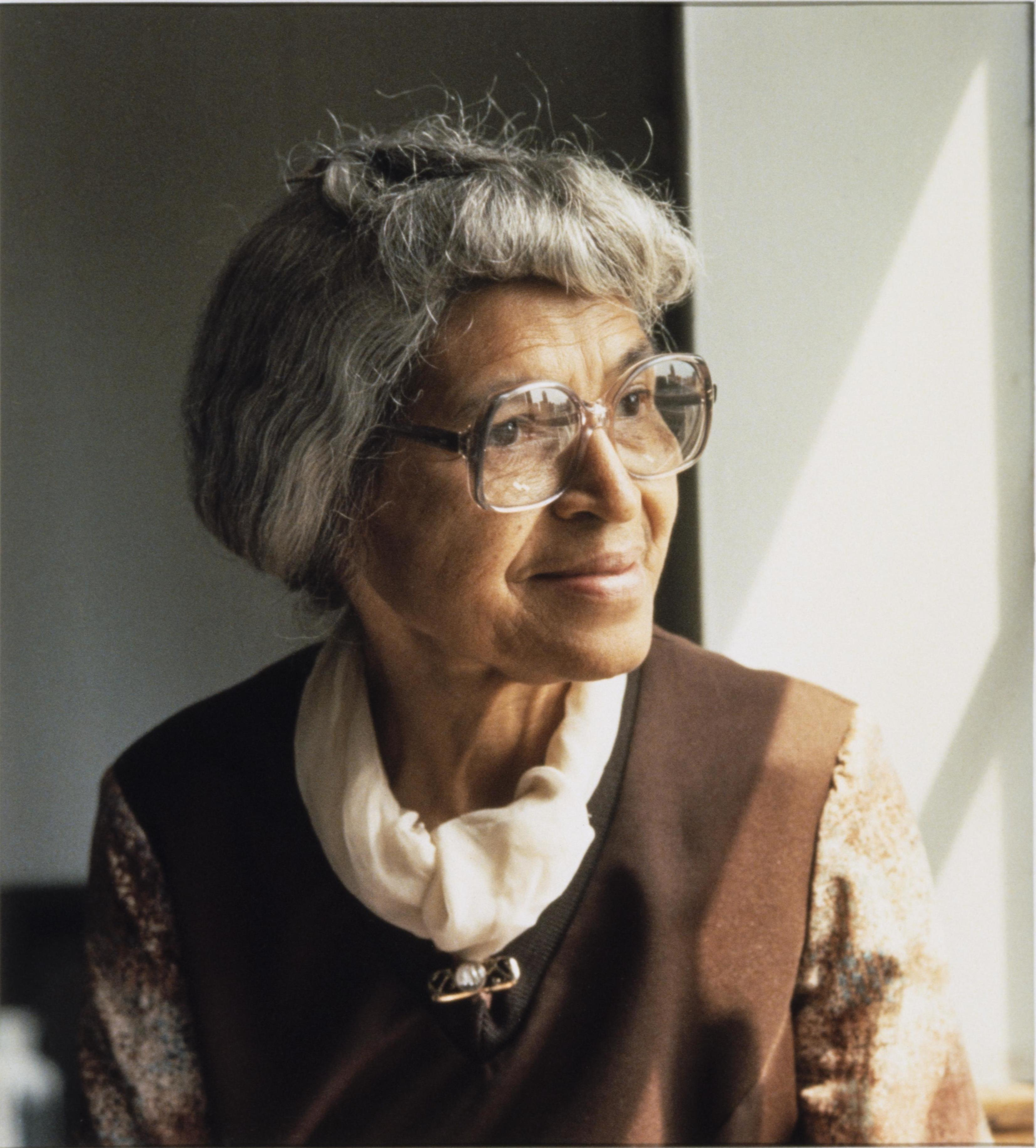
Rosa Parks

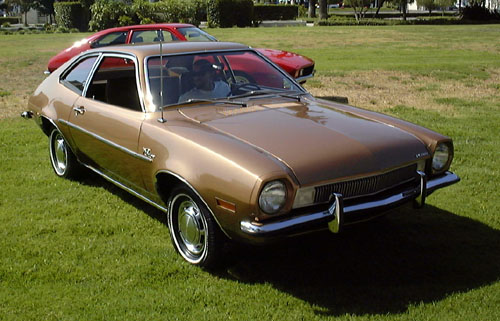
Ford Pinto

- January 3 – Sonny Eliot announced that he was leaving NBC affiliate WDIV-TV (channel 4) in Detroit. With 32 years as the station's TV weatherman, he was the longest-running TV weatherman on a single station. The following day, he was hired as the weatherman at then-CBS affiliate WJBK-TV (channel 2) in Detroit.
- January 4 – Chrysler's Hamtramck Assembly Plant, also known as Dodge Main produced its last Chrysler product. The plant opened in 1914, once employed 36,000 workers, and had its own foundry and machine shop. The final car to roll off the line was a 1980 Dodge Aspen, the 13,943,221st to be assembled at the plant.
- January 7 – President Jimmy Carter signed a $3.5 billion rescue package for Chrysler Corporation, including up to $1.5 billion in loan guarantees. Chrysler President Lee Iacocca and UAW President Douglas Fraser participated in the signing ceremony at the White House. As part of the deal, Chrysler workers agreed to contract modifications saving Chrysler $446 million by eliminating 17 paid holidays, postponing annual wage increases, and eliminating a 1980 bonus payment. In exchange, the workers received the right to 15 million shares of Chrysler stock in 1983.
- January 11 – Honda announced that it would open an assembly plant outside Marysville, Ohio, becoming the first Japanese automaker to build cars in the United States.
- January 12 – Gordie Howe, at age 51, returned to Detroit as a player for the Hartford Whalers. The game between the Red Wings and Whalers drew a record crowd of 19,905 to Joe Louis Arena. Fans chanted "Gordie, Gordie, Gordie" during the game, and one fan threw an octopus onto the ice near Howe, an old tradition when Howe played for the Red Wings at Olympia Stadium.
- January 14 – Detroit resident Rosa Parks was presented with the Martin Luther King Nonviolent Peace Prize at Ebenezer Baptist Church in Detroit. Coretta Scott King presented the award to Parks.
- January 15 – Opening statements were given in the reckless homicide case against Ford Motor Company in Elkhart County, Indiana, arising out of the death of three teenage girls who were riding in a 1973 Ford Pinto when the vehicle was rear-ended by a van. The case was the first time a corporation faced criminal charges for a defective product. Ford was represented by former Watergate prosecutor James F. Neal. On March 13, after a 10-week trial and four days of deliberations, the jury found Ford not guilty of all charges.
- January 15 – UAW President Douglas Fraser endorsed Ted Kennedy for President.
- January 15 – Michigan State athletic director Joseph Kearney announced he was leaving the school to accept a similar position at Arizona State. Two days later, football coach Darryl Rogers followed Kearney to Arizona State.
- January 19 – The Detroit Free Press published on its front page a letter purportedly written by Staff Sergeant Joseph Subic, Jr., of Redford Township, one of 52 Americans held at the American embassy in Tehran since November 4, as part of the Iran hostage crisis. On April 10, Subic appeared on Iranian television confessing that he was a spy.
- January 21 – George and Annemarie Roeper, who founded the Roeper School in 1941, announced their plans to leave the Bloomfield Hills school for gifted children.
- January 26 – Velsicol Chemical Corporation submitted its plan to clean up the site surrounding its manufacturing plant in St. Louis, Michigan.
- January 29 – Muddy Waters was hired as the new head football coach at Michigan State.

=== February ===
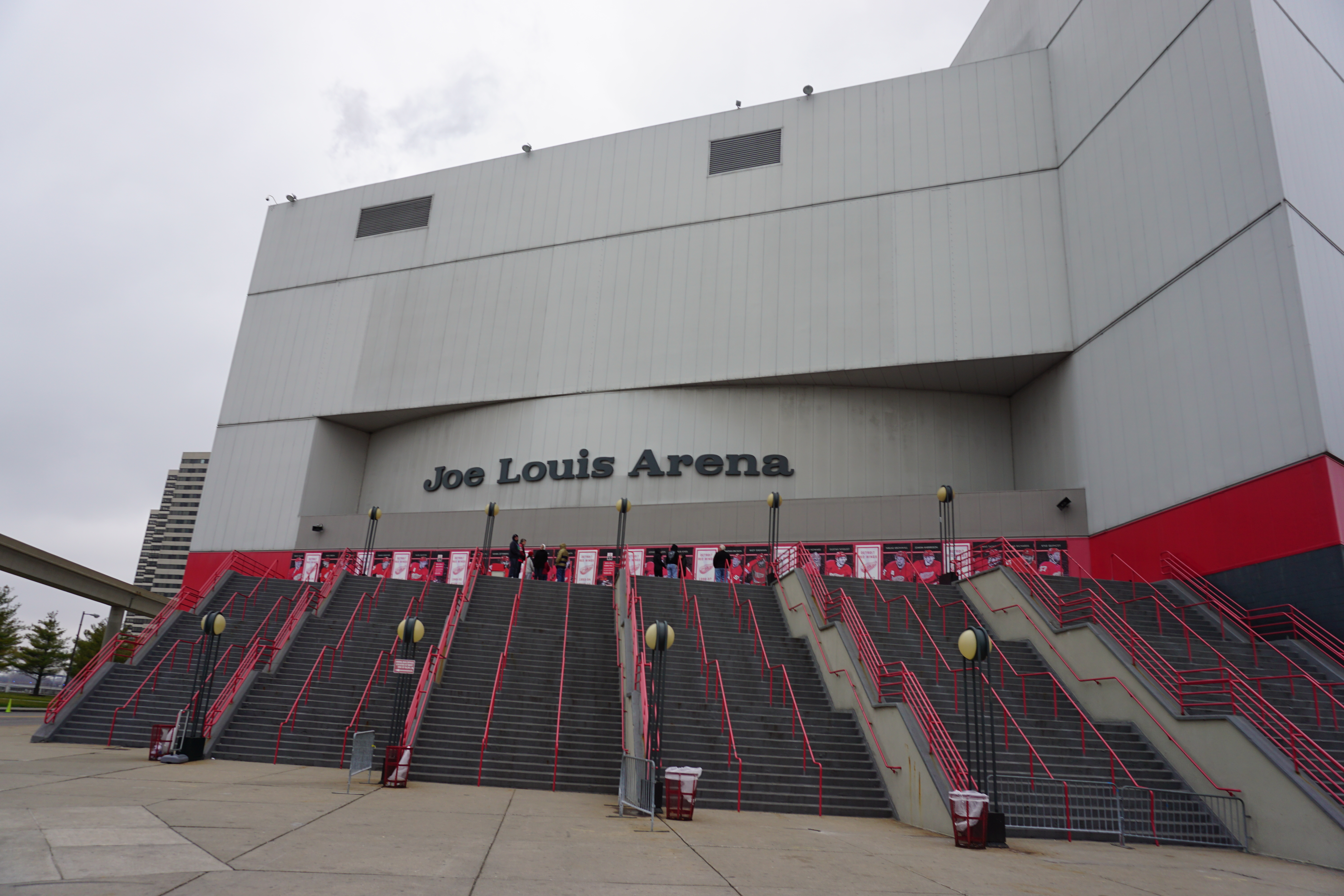
Joe Louis Arena

- February 1 – Canadians were offered free admission to the Detroit Zoo on February 1 and Henry Ford Museum on February 3 as tokens of appreciation for the Canadian Caper in which Canada rescued six American diplomats from Tehran.
- February 4 – The Detroit Pistons traded Bob Lanier to the Milwaukee Bucks for Kent Benson. Lanier had asked to be traded. He spent 10 years with the Pistons and was selected for the All-Star team seven times.
- February 5 – The NHL All-Star Game was played at Joe Louis Arena in Detroit. The game drew a crowd of 21,002 persons, the largest crowd to watch a professional hockey game to that date. The crowd gave Gordie Howe a two-and-a-half minute standing ovation before the game and another ovation when he assisted on a goal.
- February 7 – Chrysler released its 1979 fourth quarter results, showing a loss of $375 million in the final three months. Losses for the year were in excess of $1 billion, the largest corporate loss in history.
- February 19 – The divorce trial of Henry Ford II and Cristina Ford began in Detroit. Shortly after the case was called for trial, the parties reached a confidential property settlement.
- February 22 – The United States Olympic Hockey Team defeated the Soviet Union in the semifinals of the Winter Olympics, in the Miracle on Ice. Michigan natives Ken Morrow of Davison and Mark Wells of St. Clair Shores were members of the USA team.
- February 28 – Chrysler Corporation delivered the first two XM1 tanks to the Army.

=== March ===
- March 7 – The U.S. Justice Department sued the city of Birmingham, Michigan, for violation of fair housing laws in blocking the development of racially integrated low-income housing. On April 7, voters in Birmingham rejected for the fourth time to oppose subsidized housing for the elderly and low-income families.
- March 10 – Herman Tarnower, developer of the Scarsdale diet, was shot and killed by ex-lover Jean Harris, a Wayne State alumnus who worked as a teacher in Grosse Pointe from 1946 to 1966, including 16 years at University Liggett School. Harris was later convicted of the murder.
- March 12 – Five Michigan Wolverines football players, including linebacker Ben Needham and quarterback B. J. Dickey, were kicked off the team for training violations arising out of an incident allegedly involving the use of drugs. Four of the five players vehemently denied any involvement with drugs. On March 14, head coach Bo Schembechler clarified that the players were only temporarily suspended.
- March 13 – On the same day that the company was acquitted in the Pinto trial, Henry Ford II stepped down as president and CEO of Ford Motor Co. Philip Caldwell replaced Ford as the company's president and CEO.
- March 14 – The UAW announced plans to begin pickets at foreign car dealerships as part of a campaign to discourage the purchase of foreign cars. The union picketed at Dearborn Toyota on March 27.
- March 15 – After his name was placed on the Michigan primary ballot, Gerald Ford announced that he would not run for the Republican presidential nomination. Ford called it the "toughest decision of my life."

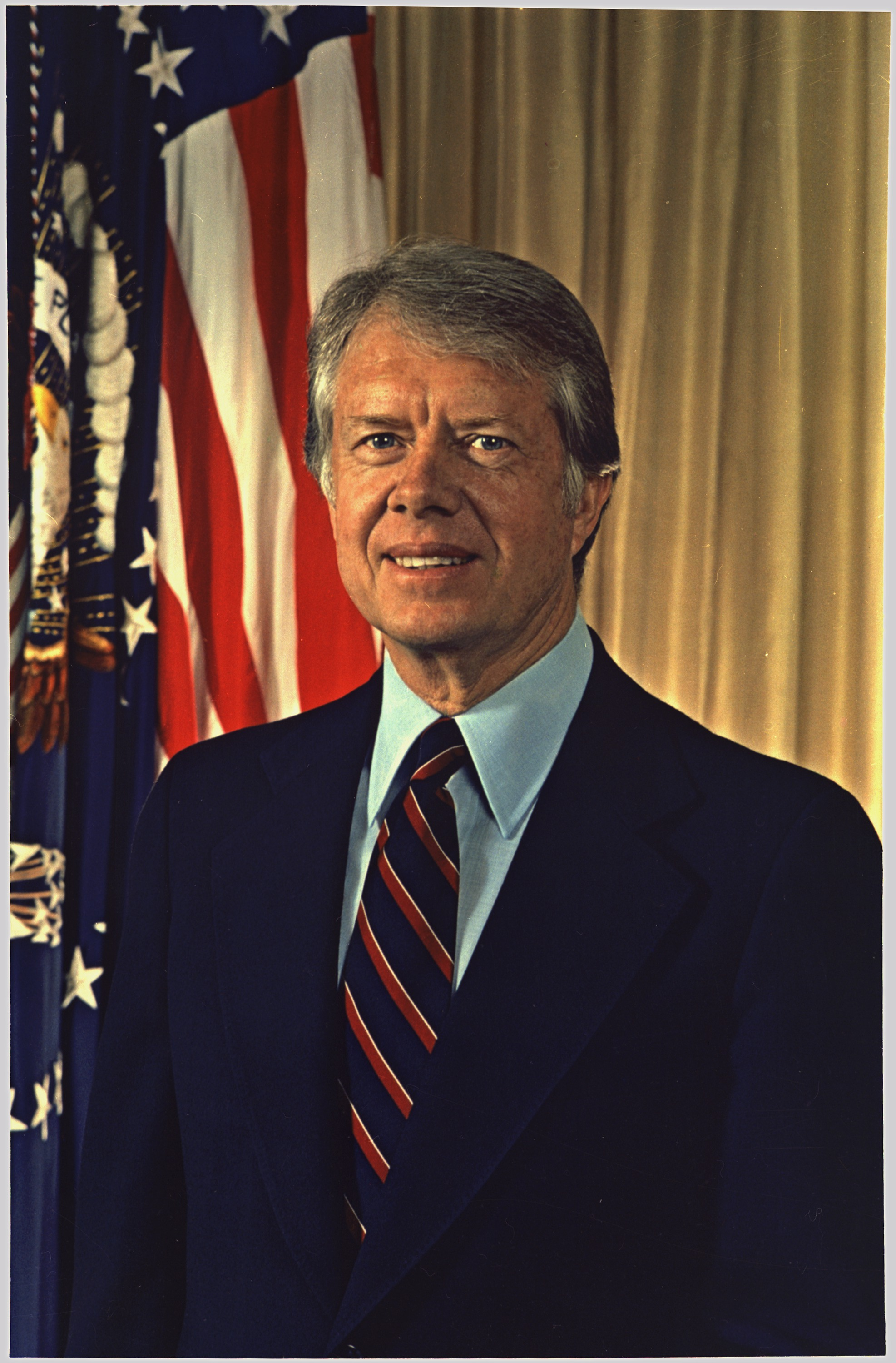
Jimmy Carter

- March 18 – President Jimmy Carter announced his opposition to limits on Japanese car imports, arguing that the Japanese imports helped control inflation and reduce gasoline consumption. Carter's position drew criticism from the UAW.
- March 20 – Detroit Police Chief William L. Hart fired five police officers for using cattle prods on prisoners. Mayor Coleman Young supported the firings, noting that the city would not tolerate police brutality. Three of the fired officers were reinstated by the Board of Police Commissioners on April 17.
- March 21 – Bobby Kromm was fired as head coach of the Detroit Red Wings. General manager Ted Lindsay and assistant coach Marcel Pronovost took over coaching duties for the rest of the season. Lindsay took over as full-time head coach on April 11.
- March 25 – Michigan Wolverines men's basketball head coach Johnny Orr resigned his post at Michigan to become the head basketball coach at Iowa State. Orr, who was the winningest basketball coach in Michigan history, was lured by a compensation package that roughly tripled his compensation at Michigan.
- March 26 – Ferris State accounting professor Robert Brauer was shot to death while teaching a class. The assailant was one of his students who was also the son of the dean.

=== April ===
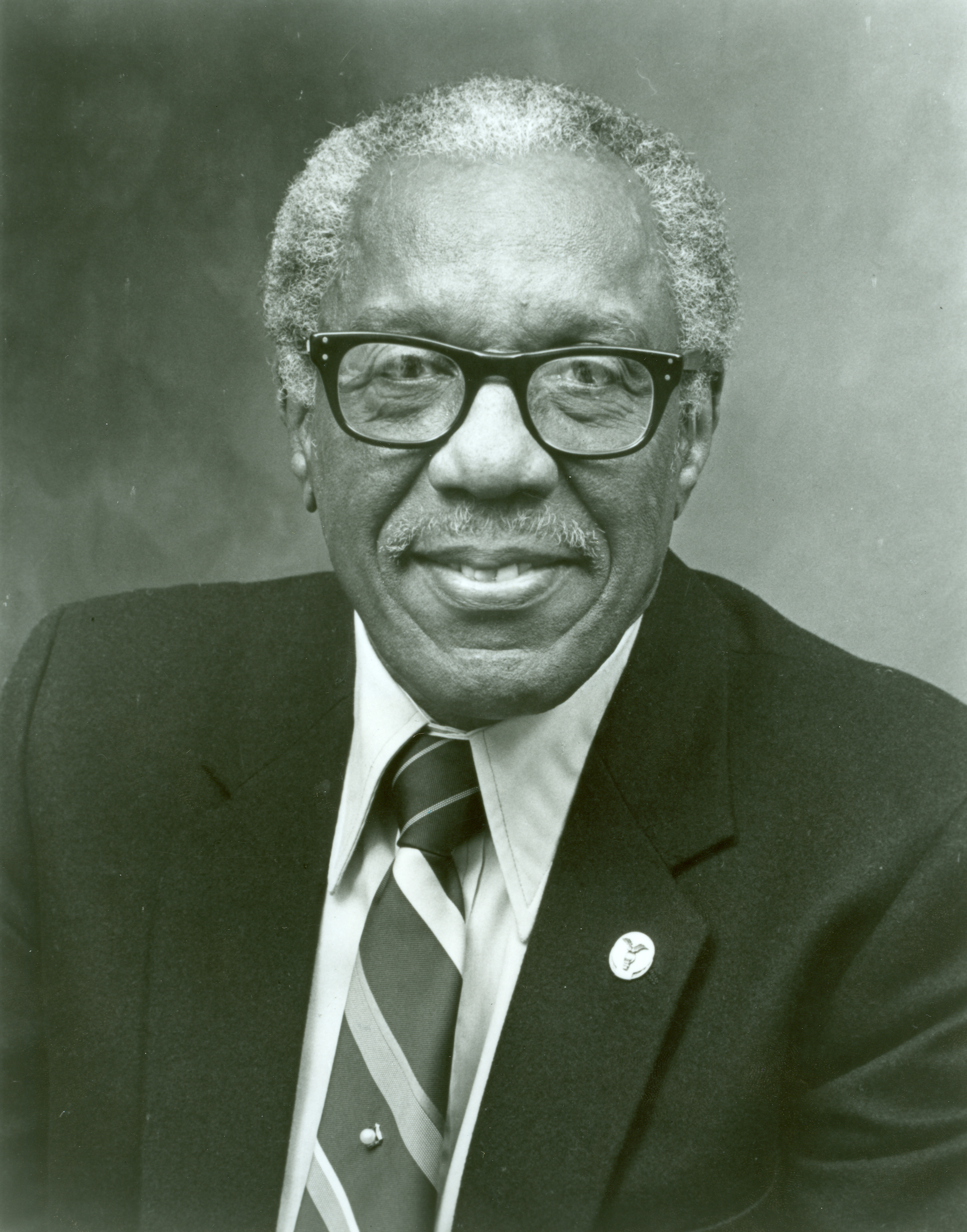
George W. Crockett Jr.

- April 14 – The Sixth Circuit Court of Appeals issued an order requiring the busing program in Detroit be expanded.
- April 14 – Harold Shapiro was invested as the 10th president of the University of Michigan. He remained president until 1988.
- April 15 – Faced with large losses, Ford Motor announced that it was closing three plants and eliminating 15,000 jobs. The next day, General Motors announced layoffs of 12,000 workers at seven plants.
- April 18 – Sen. Ted Kennedy attacked President Carter for failing to take sufficient actions, including threatening to freeze or impose a quota on Japanese imports, to protect the jobs of American auto workers. On the same day, the Carter administration announced that it would provide special benefits to 48,000 laid off Ford workers. By April 26, the Department of Labor had expanded to 131,000 those eligible for the special unemployment benefits to workers who lost their jobs to foreign car imports.
- April 18 – Michigan Gov. William Milliken endorsed George H. W. Bush in the race for the Republican Party presidential nomination.
- April 18 – George W. Crockett Jr. announced that he would oppose Charles Diggs for the congressional seat held by Diggs since 1955. Diggs, who was convicted of mail fraud in October 1978 and was censured by the House in 1979, announced on May 14 that he would retire from Congress at the end of his term and not seek re-election.
- April 21 – Lucien N. Nedzi of Hamtramck announced that he would not seek reelection for another term as Congressman from Michigan's 14th district.
- April 22 – Chrysler announced that it was eliminating 6,900 non-production jobs, a 20% reduction. Three days later, General Motors announced that it would layoff 10%, or 18,000, of its salaried jobs.
- April 26 – Ted Kennedy won a narrow victory over Jimmy Carter in Michigan's Democratic caucus, winning 71 delegates to 70 for Carter.
- April 28 – Ford Motor Co. announced a $164 million loss for the first quarter of 1980, the worst quarterly loss in the company's 77-year history.
- April 29 – The Detroit Lions selected Heisman Trophy winner Billy Sims of Oklahoma with the first pick in the 1980 NFL draft. On June 10, Sims signed a $2 million three-year contract with the Lions, making him the highest paid player in the NFL.
- April 30 – A Soviet freighter, the Vasha Shishkovsky, with a crew of 37, was stranded in Ludington, Michigan, after members of the International Longshoremen's Association, in a protest over the Soviet invasion of Afghanistan, refused to pilot the ship through the Great Lakes. The ship departed on May 3 after a Canadian pilot was brought to Ludington to guide the ship.
- April 30 – The City of Flint reached settlement with the U.S. Justice Department in a suit seeking to desegregate Flint's public schools.

=== May ===
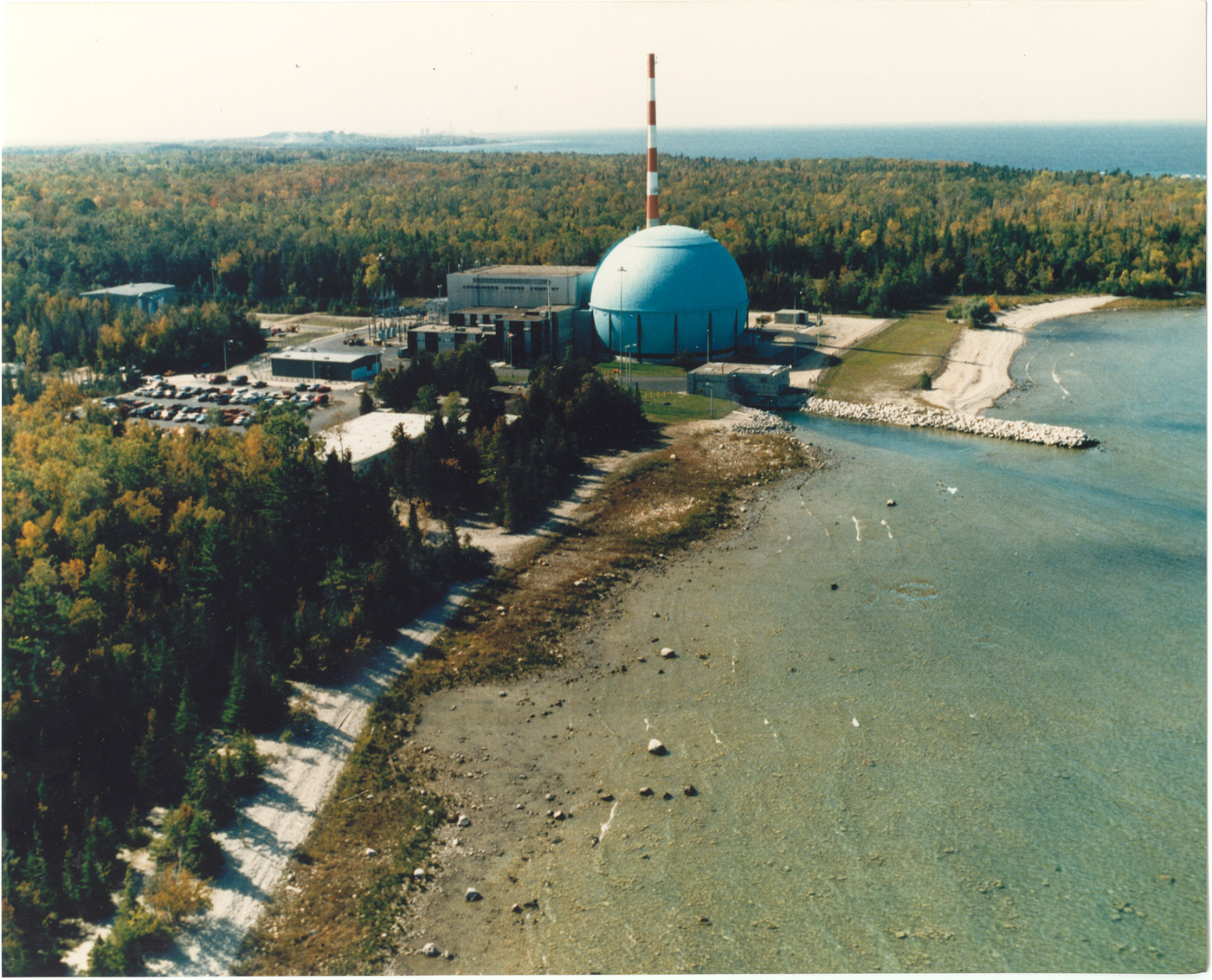
Big Rock Point Nuclear Power Plant

- May 2 – April unemployment figures showed Michigan with a 12.4% unemployment rate and 523,000 workers unemployed. The unemployment rate was the highest in the state since 1975 and more than five points above the national rate of 7.0%.
- May 4 – A sit-down protest against safety conditions at the Big Rock Point Nuclear Power Plant on Lake Michigan near Charlevoix resulted in 16 arrests. The plant, opened in 1962, was the fifth oldest nuclear plant in the country and lacked the three-foot safety wall on more modern plants, having only a three-quarter inch steel barrier around the reactor's containment dome.
- May 7 – Chrysler reported a $449 million loss in the first quarter of 1980. Three days later, the company's chairman Lee Iacocca negotiated the final points needed to secure the federal government's $1.5 billion in loan guarantees needed to bail out the struggling auto maker. Chrysler's employees as of May 1980 totaled 47,200, down from 81,700 two years earlier.
- May 13 – The 1980 Kalamazoo tornado rated F3 on the Fujita scale struck downtown Kalamazoo, killing five people and injuring more than 80. Damage was estimated at $50 million.
- May 13 – Ten paintings owned by Henry Ford II were sold for $18.3 million at an auction at Christie's in New York. Van Gogh's "Le Jardin du Poete" sold for $5.2 million, the second highest price paid for a painting. Cézanne's "Paysan en Blouse Bleue" sold for $3.9 million, the fourth highest price paid for a painting. Gauguin's "La Plage au Pouldu" sold for $2.9 million.
- May 15 – In a speech to the Detroit Economic Club, Ronald Reagan promised if elected president to reduce taxes and eliminate regulations that had crippled the automobile industry.

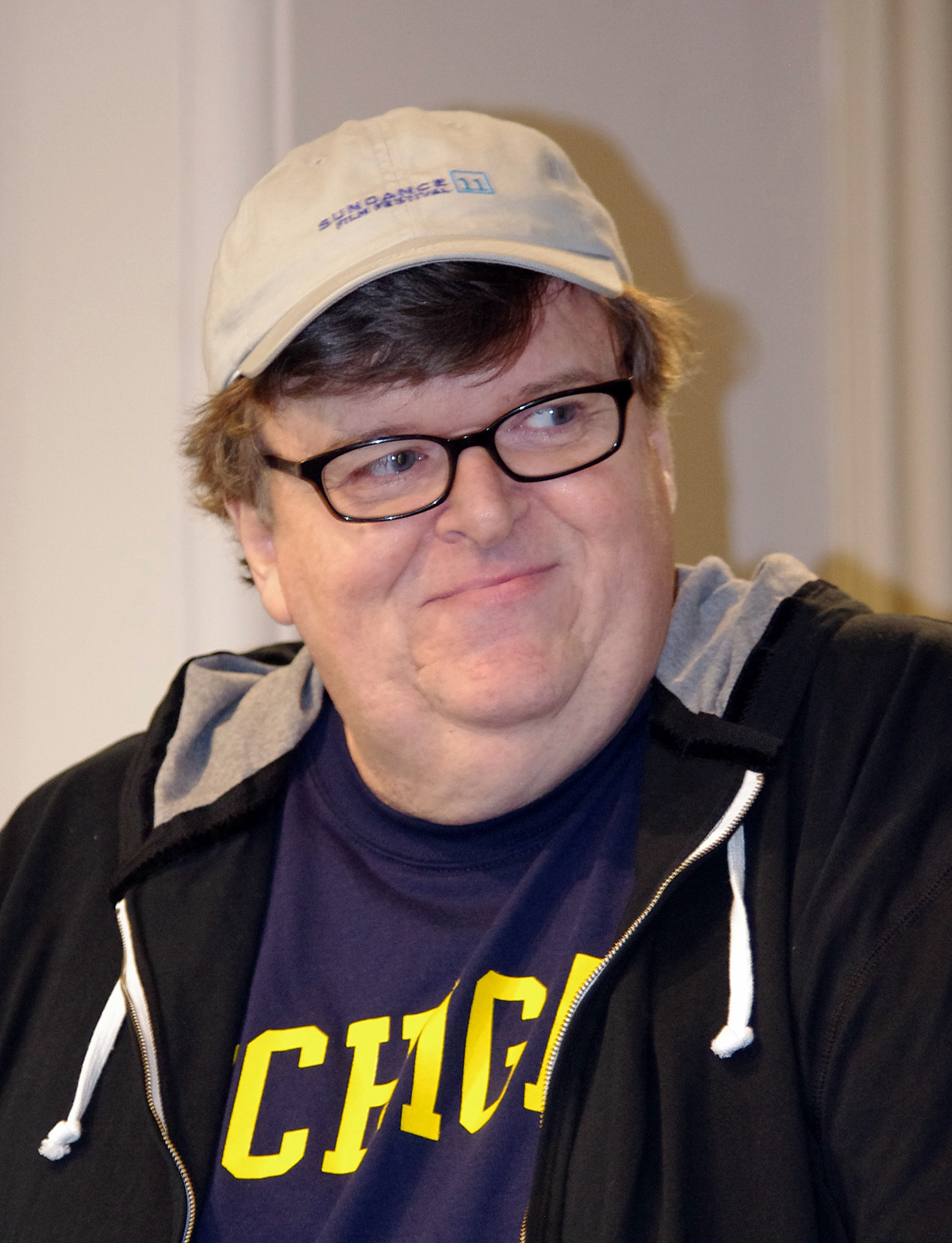
Michael Moore

- May 15 – Flint police executed a search warrant at the offices of The Flint Voice, an alternative weekly newspaper founded and operated by Michael Moore. The paper had published a confidential city report concerning alleged coercion of city employees by Flint's mayor. The search sought to determine the source of the leak. In June, the ACLU filed suit to prevent further searches of the newspaper's office. The search drew national media attention, including The New York Times, Associated Press, and CBS News.
- May 16 – Chrysler announced plans to close its Lynch Road assembly plant at the end of the 1980 model year.
- May 16 – A law permitting medical marijuana was signed into law in Michigan.
- May 16 – NBA rookie Magic Johnson, who had led Michigan State to an NCAA championship in 1979, led the Los Angeles Lakers to the NBA championship. Johnson scored 42 points in the decisive sixth game and was named the Most Valuable Player of the playoffs.
- May 17 – Former Michigan Gov. John Swainson was arrested for drunk driving in Lenawee County. It was Swainson's second drunk driving charge in two-and-a-half years.
- May 19 – The Ferndale Board of Education dropped its appeal of a federal order desegregating its schools. Justice Department litigation to desegregate the Ferndale schools began in 1968 as the first federal prosecution of a school system outside the South. The Ferndale busing plan was publicly revealed on October 8, and went into effect on January 5, 1981.
- May 20 – In the Republican Party presidential primary in Michigan, George H. W. Bush, with backing from Gov. William Milliken, defeated Ronald Reagan by a margin of 57% to 32%.
- May 21 – Three Detroit police officers were demoted for their roles in the January 17 arrest and strip search of Mayor Coleman Young's two sisters and niece. The three women were detained after a dispute over a parking space at a building owned by one of the police officers who was demoted. Commander Anthony Fierimonti was demoted two ranks to lieutenant. On May 29, three of the officers involved denied conducting strip searches, claiming the women were merely patted down, in television interviews. One of the officers, an African-American woman, charged that the mayor's niece had blocked another car, refused to move her car, tried to attack the tow truck driver called to remove her vehicle, and screamed at her: "You black bitch. I'm the mayor's niece and you can't do this to me; I'll have your job."
- May 23 – General Motors announced plans to increase capital spending to $40 billion through 1984. GM Chairman Thomas Murphy called it "the most ambitious" capital spending plan "ever undertaken by any corporation anywhere in the world at any time in history."
- May 27 – The Detroit Tigers traded Jason Thompson, the team's first baseman for the past four-and-a-half years, to the California Angels for Al Cowens.

=== June ===
- June 2 – Charles Diggs lost the final appeal of his 1978 conviction in a payroll kickback scheme. He resigned from Congress the following day. Diggs had served in Congress for 25 years. Diggs began serving his prison sentence on July 24 at a prison camp in Alabama.
- June 4 – Sales by American automakers for May fell to 496,120 cars, the lowest monthly total since September 1963.
- June 6 – Unemployment figures for Michigan during the month of May showed a 14.0% unemployment rate, the highest since 1975, and 607,000 persons out of work in Michigan. The unemployment rate in Detroit rose to 18.4% in May.
- June 11 – The federal government launched the largest recall in automotive history, charging that 26 million Ford cars had defective transmissions linked to 98 deaths. The recall was later rescinded pursuant to an agreement with the Department of Transportation allowing Ford to send warning notices in lieu of repairs.
- June 17 – Detroit Tigers general manager Jim Campbell closed the 10,500 bleacher seats at Tiger Stadium due to rowdyism. Campbell said: "I'm just goddamn fed up with them. I'm sick and tired. It's dangerous. It gives the city a bad name." The team re-opened of the bleachers on June 30 with new restrictions on beer sales and additional security.
- June 20 – Two holdout banks agreed to terms for the Chrysler bailout, allowing the $1.5 billion rescue package to proceed and averting a bankruptcy filing by the company. Chrysler received its first $500 million loan on June 24.
- June 24 – Frank "Nitti" Usher, a reputed drug dealer from Detroit, was convicted of shooting and beheading three victims on July 18, 1979.
- June 25 – A 150-pound Michigan brown bear was deported from Canada after escaping from Detroit's Belle Isle Zoo and swimming to Windsor, Ontario, Canada. The bear was returned to the wilds of northern Michigan in July.
- June 25 – Democrats in the Michigan Legislature sought a federal declaration of Michigan as a disaster area, and resulting disaster aid, based on the dire economic condition of the state.
- June 27 – Ford Motor gave its final public tours of its River Rouge plant. The public tours came to an end after 52 years.
- June 28 – 20 residents of an all-white Sanger Street in a west Detroit neighborhood protested and vandalized a home owned by a black family and harassed a black television reporter sent to cover the scene. The black family required police assistance to pack and depart as white residents taunted them. The incident triggered an FBI investigation.
- June 29 – Detroit Receiving Hospital, the state's first level one trauma center, opened after the closure of Detroit General Hospital.
- June 30 – General Motors announced that its new assembly plant (Detroit/Hamtramck Assembly) would be located on 575 acres straddling Hamtramck and the Poletown area on the near-east side of Detroit, requiring the removal of 1,500 homes, 150 businesses, several churches and a hospital. The use of eminent domain, with backing from Detroit Mayor Coleman Young, to acquire the property was the subject of protests and court battles. The Michigan Supreme Court ultimately ruled that economic development was a legitimate use of eminent domain.

=== July ===
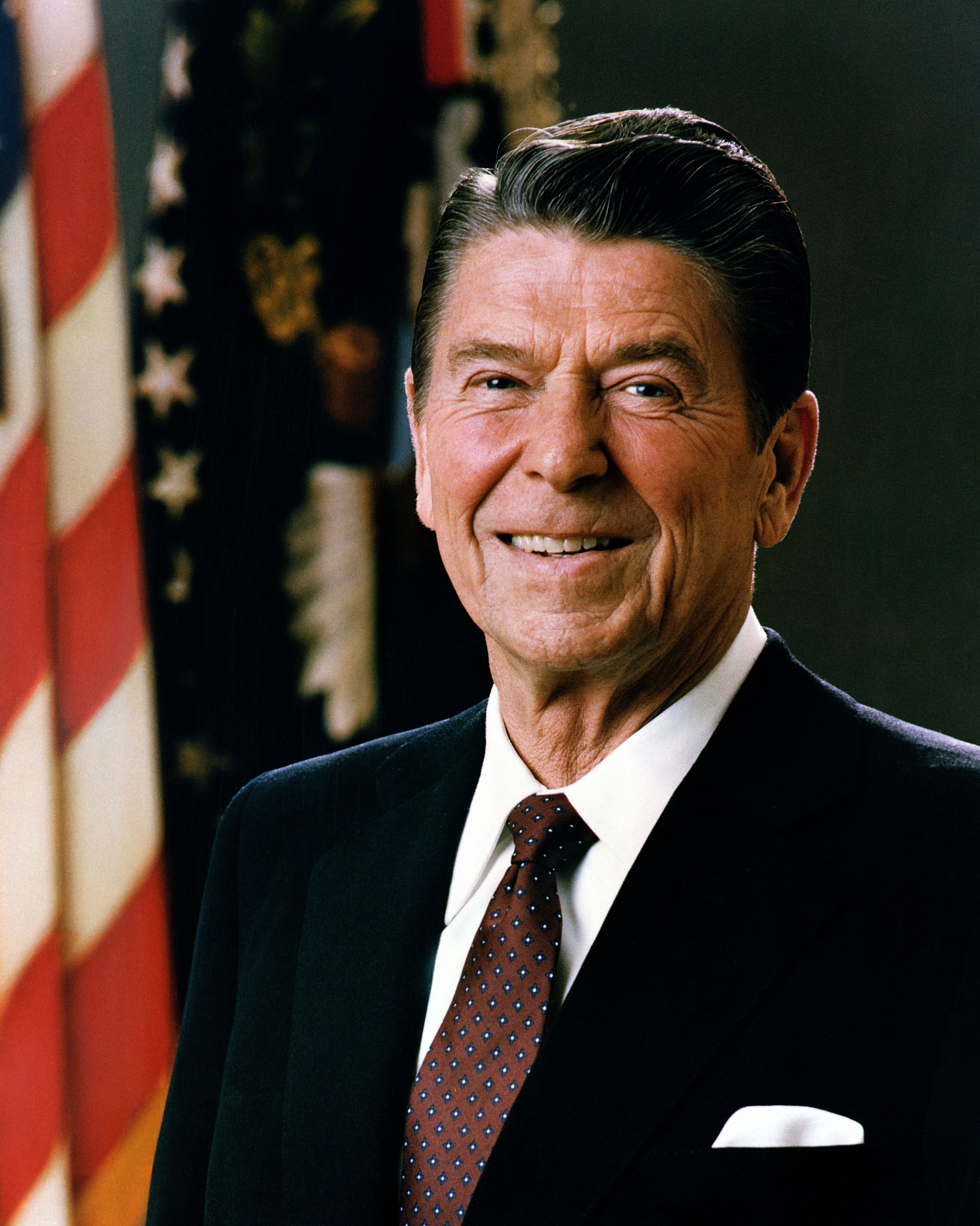
Ronald Reagan

- July 1 – A strike by 5,000 of Detroit's municipal workers, including garbage collectors, commenced. By July 2, garbage had begun to pile up, and the city's bus system was also shut down by the strike. By July 3, the strike had expanded to 9,000 city workers. By July 8, 39 water main breaks remained unrepaired as water and sewer employees joined the strike. On July 11, the strike was settled with a six percent wage increase. Two weeks later, Mayor Young ordered all departments to cut back operations by 10% to pay for the pay increase.
- July 3 – An eight-foot-high cross was burned on the lawn of a black family in Farmington Hills. The FBI launched an investigation.
- July 8 – President Carter and Vice President Mondale met in Detroit with automobile company executives and UAW leaders to propose a $1 billion aid package and a government-industry-labor cooperation committee.
- July 14 – Cardinal John Francis Dearden, citing poor health, retired as archbishop of Detroit.
- July 14–17 – The 1980 Republican National Convention was held at Joe Louis Arena in Detroit. Ronald Reagan and George H. W. Bush were nominated as the party's presidential and vice-presidential nominees, respectively. The convention was estimated to have generated $44 million into the local economy, mostly for hotels and restaurants.
- July – A Teamster strike shut down the Detroit Free Press during the Republican National Convention. Limited portions of the Free Press were published in conjunction with The Detroit News during the strike.
- July 24 – General Motors announced a second quarter loss of $412 million, the company's first quarterly loss since the Great Depression.
- July 24 – Detroit's Merrill Palmer Institute, an educational psychology school founded in 1920 with a bequeath from Lizzie Pitts Merrill Palmer, announced that it would cease operations in August with some of its programs being taken over by Wayne State University.
- July 28 – Detroit's Renaissance Center reported a $9.1 million loss in the first three months of 1980. The yearly loss totaled $30 million.
- July 29 – Ford Motor reported a second quarter loss of $468 million, the worst quarterly loss in the company's history.
- July 31 – Chrysler posted a $536 million loss for the second quarter, the worst quarterly loss ever reported by an automobile company to that time.

=== August ===
- August 1 – Moody's adjusted its rating on Detroit general obligation bonds to below investment grade. A week later, Standard & Poor's also downgraded Detroit's credit rating.

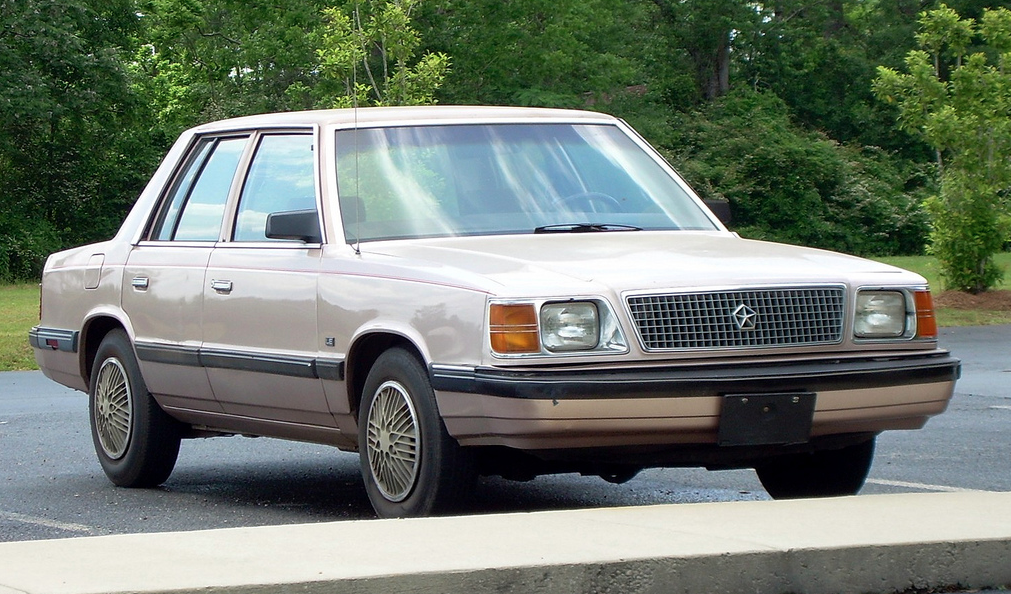
Chrysler K-car

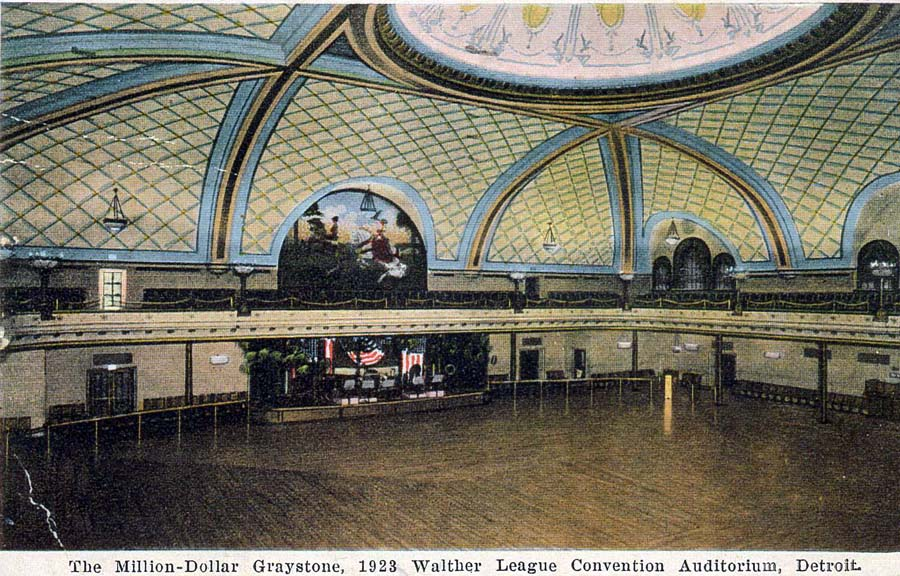
Graystone Ballroom

- August 5 –

* George W. Crockett Jr. won the primary to be the Democratic nominee to replace Charles Diggs in Michigan's 13th congressional district.
* Dennis Hertel won the primary to be the Democratic nominee to replace Lucien N. Nedzi in Michigan's 14th congressional district.
* Gerald R. Carlson won the Republican nomination in Michigan's 15th congressional district. He was a former Nazi who gained notoriety for forming a white supremacist group that sought to keep minorities out of Dearborn. Republican leaders urged voters to write in James Caygill who Carlson defeated in the primary.
* Alfred Lawrence Patterson, a 25-year-old mental patient, won the Republican nomination in Michigan's 17th congressional district. Patterson was listed on the ballot as L. Patterson, causing some voters to believe they were voting for Oakland County Prosecutor L. Brooks Patterson. In what the Detroit Free Press called "one of the oddest events in Michigan political history," Patterson was released from the Northville Regional Mental Hospital and gave a press conference on his porch the following day saying that he would leave the race "only if he cannot find the man in the white snakeskin boots who tried to give him a glass of water swirling with 3/16-inch clear worms."
* A tax increase to fund schools was rejected by Detroit voters.

- August 6 – Chrysler chairman Lee Iacocca drove the first K-car, a Plymouth Reliant, off the assembly line at Detroit's Jefferson Avenue plant.
- August 11 – Ford Motor Co.'s first Ford Escort rolled off the assembly line in Wayne, Michigan. The Escort became the best-selling automobile in the United States for most of the 1980s.
- August 16 – Detroit's Graystone Ballroom, opened in 1922, was demolished.

=== September ===
- September 1 – Pres. Jimmy Carter skipped Detroit's traditional Labor Day event. Ronald Reagan appeared at the Michigan State Fair in Detroit, blasting Carter for creating an economic depression. Responding to Carter's contention that it was only a recession, Reagan replied, "For the fellow who has lost his job, it's a depression." Reagan remained in Michigan the next day, campaigning at Chrysler's K-car assembly line and accusing Carter of failing in his duty to slow the flood of Japanese imports. Independent candidate John Anderson also campaigned in Michigan on September 2 and 3.
- September 3 – Eastern Orthodox cleric Valerian Trifa of Grass Lake, Michigan, was stripped of his American citizenship for concealing his leadership of an anti-Semitic group when he was a young man in Romania. After learning that the government intended to deport him, Trifa appealed the denaturalization order.
- September 5 – 690 Detroit police officers were laid off due to the city's budget shortfall.
- September 6 – Princess Grace of Monaco appeared at the Detroit Institute of Arts for a poetry reading. She read "Look What You Did, Christopher" by Ogden Nash.
- September 7 – Billy Sims rushed for 153 yards in the Detroit Lions' season opener, a victory over the Los Angeles Rams.
- September 10 – Roger Smith was named the successor to Thomas Murphy as General Motors' chairman and CEO.
- September 10 – 1980 census figures showed the population of Detroit had dropped by 23.5% to 1,157,131, a decline of 356,933 between 1970 and 1980. The city contended that its population was under-counted and sought an adjustment in court. On September 25, a federal judge in Detroit ordered the Census Bureau to account for "an estimated five million, particularly minorities in big cities, who were missed" in the count.
- September 12 – The Michigan Supreme Court ruled that a proposed amendment to the state constitution authored by Shiawassee County drain commissioner Robert Tisch (known as the Tisch Amendment) to cut property taxes by 50% had qualified to appear on the November ballot. Gov. William Milliken warned that passage would lead to massive cuts in state services, including closure of state parks, universities, and hospitals. Detroit Mayor Coleman Young called it an "invitation to anarchy".
- September 14 – Msgr. George Garmo, pastor for 20 years at the Mother of God Cathedral in Southfield, Michigan, was appointed as the Archbishop of the Chaldean Catholic Archeparchy of Mosul in Iraq. He remained as the Archbishop of Mosul until his death in 1999.
- September 24 - A federal jury in Detroit rejected a lawsuit by Johnny Carson against a company in Utica, Michigan, seeking to restrain its use of the phrase "Here's Johnny" in marketing its portable toilets.

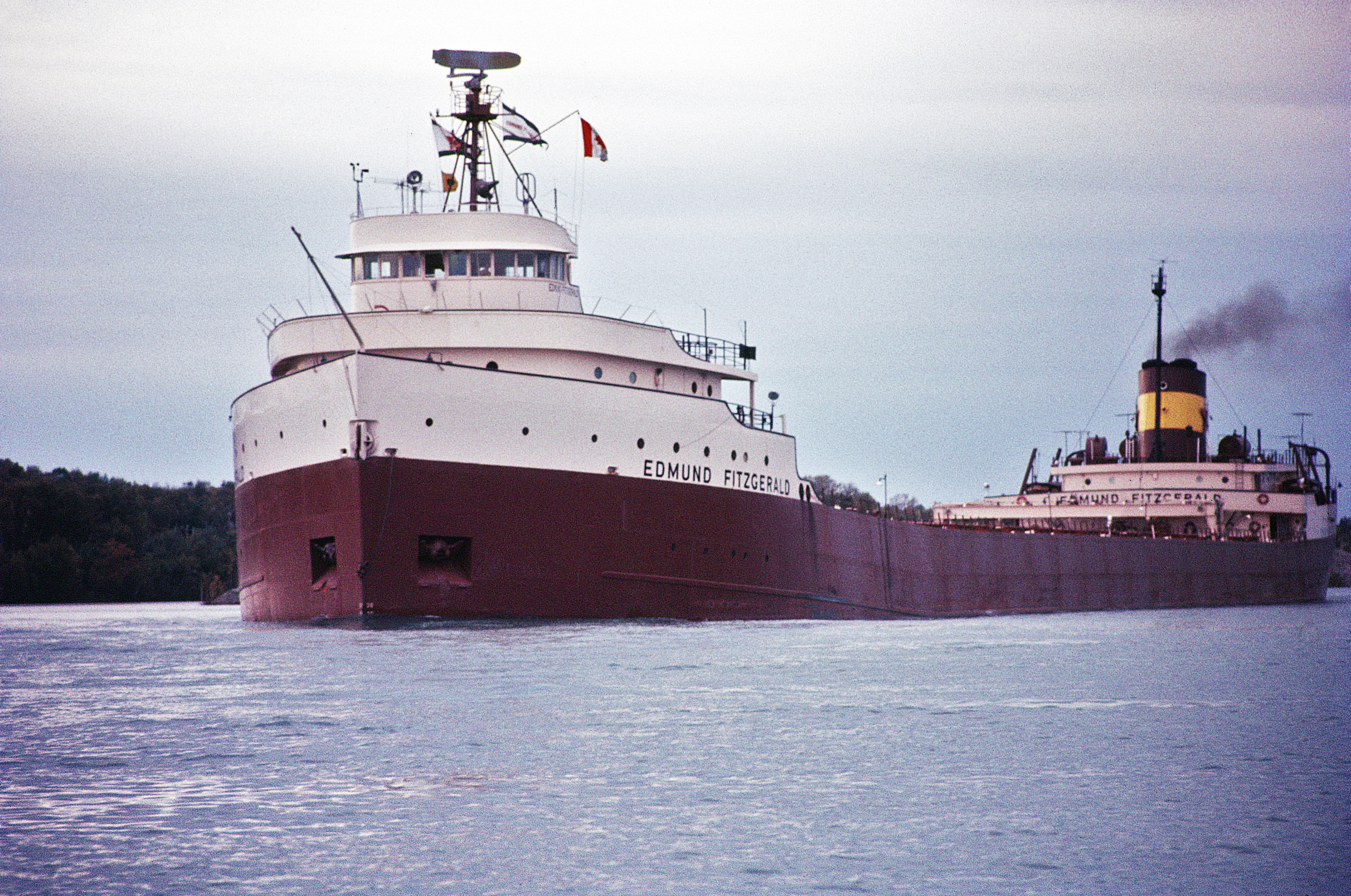
Edmund Fitzgerald

- September 24 - The crew of Jacques Cousteau's research ship Calypso became the first individuals to see the wreckage of the Edmund Fitzgerald at the bottom of Lake Superior. The ship sunk in November 1975 with a crew of 29. The crew's observations suggested that the Edmund Fitzgerald may have broken in half before sinking. On September 30, Cousteau received a key to the city from Detroit Mayor Coleman Young.
- September 24 - Renault announced a plan to acquire nearly half of American Motors' stock as part of a bailout plan pursuant to which Renault committed to a $300 million cash infusion. The arrangement also provided a takeover mechanism.

=== October ===
- October 1 – President Jimmy Carter spent his 56th birthday campaigning in Michigan. Crowds sang "Happy Birthday" to him at a town meeting in Flint and at a speech to 2,000 auto workers at the Ford plant in Wayne. Republican vice presidential candidate George Bush had said Carter "didn't have the guts" to show up in Flint; Carter vowed to continue working with the UAW the automobile industry to put Flint back on its feet.
- October 2 – An all-white jury found in favor of the family of Red Jamsion in a racial discrimination suit alleging that WJBK-TV in Detroit fired him as a sportscaster due to his white race and in order to allow the station to hire African American Charlie Neal. Jamison hung himself two years later in a Nashville motel room. Three weeks later, the jury awarded Jamison's family $235,000 in damages.
- October 3 – The U.S. government provided a $6 million grant toward the construction of the AutoWorld theme park in Flint. The theme park's total budget of $42.6 million also included $11 million from the Mott Foundation, and $19 million to be raised through bond sales.
- October 7 – Vice President Walter Mondale campaigned in Detroit and Warren, noting that Ronald Reagan's reversals on programs like Medicare, the minimum wage, and aid to New York City and Chrysler were like a deathbed conversion and compared Reagan's relationship with American working men and women to Col. Sanders' relationship to the American chicken. On the same day, former President Gerald Ford campaigned in Michigan to attack Jimmy Carter over the recession and to talk football with Bo Schembechler.

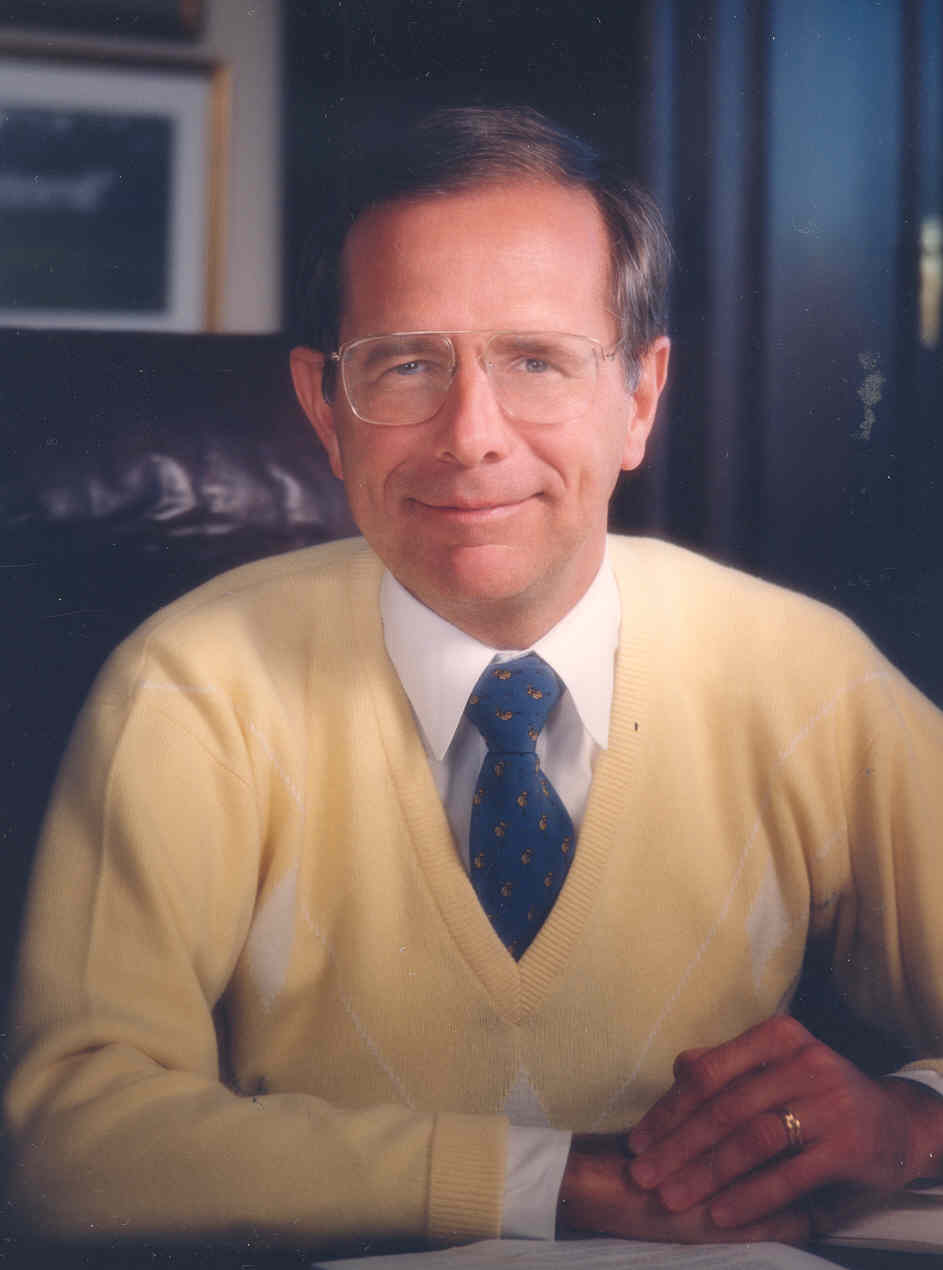
William Agee

- October 9 – Mary Cunningham, 29-year-old vice president of Bendix for strategic planning, resigned her position amid controversy over her alleged affair with Bendix CEO William Agee. The rumored relationship had been the topic of unwanted media attention and gossip. In a December interview with the Detroit Free Press, her first substantive interview since resigning, Cunningham denied that she and Bendix had a romantic relationship. Cunningham and Agee were married in 1982.
- October 12 – In a hazing incident at the University of Michigan, a freshman on the Michigan Wolverines men's ice hockey team was stripped, shaved, driven around in the trunk of a car, and left out in the cold. Michigan President Harold Shapiro described the hazing as reprehensible and vowed to impose sanctions against those involved. On October 18, the university announced that three players, Tim Manning, John Blum, and Jeff Mars, had been suspended for two games for their roles in the hazing.
- October 14 – Henry Ford II, age 63, was married to Kathleen DuRoss, a former model who had been his companion for five years, in Carson City, Nevada. The marriages was Ford's third.
- October 14 – U.S. Secretary of State Edmund Muskie spoke in Ann Arbor at a "Peace Corps Rededication Ceremony" on the 20th anniversary of John Kennedy's speech announcing plans for the organization. Having difficulty being heard over noise from a group of protesters opposed to military intervention in the Persian Gulf, Muskie chastised the protesters and urged them to join the Peace Corps and help people in need.
- October 15 – First Federal Savings of Niles was involuntarily merged with Standard Federal Savings & Loan by federal regulators. On September 2, the Niles institution became the first to be placed under federal emergency control after losing $9 million as the result of "highly risky and unauthorized financial transactions" by its former president James Yocum.
- October 15–16 – Ronald Reagan held a rally at the Flint Southwestern High School gymnasium on October 15. He blamed President Carter for the dismal state of Flint's economy, described himself as an "old union man", and vowed to help the automobile industry. On October 16, Reagan appeared with George Bush and Gerald Ford in Detroit where he received an endorsement from civil rights leader Ralph Abernathy; Abernathy said that Carter had "failed to deliver on campaign promises and had ignored the needs of blacks."
- October 24 – President Carter campaigned in Grand Rapids. Carter cautioned against expectations that he might negotiate a release of the hostage in Iran prior to the election and attacked Ronald Reagan's "voodoo economics." In Detroit, 300 black religious and political leaders rallied for Carter in Detroit; Detroit city president Erma Henderson compared Reagan to the Ku Klux Klan.
- October 27 – General Motors announced a loss of $567 million from July to September, representing the largest quarterly loss for any company in American history. The company blamed the loss on the recession, a shift toward smaller cars, increased costs, price incentives, and model changeover expenses. On October 28, Ford Motor topped the record set by GM, announcing its own second-quarter loss of $595 million. On October 29, Chrysler announced a second-quarter loss of $490 million.
- October 27 – Three Detroit men, Henry Dee Jackson, Lewis Douglas Moore, and Melvin Charles Cale, were returned from Cuba to the United States after hijacking a Southern Airways flight to Cuba in 1972. Two Michigan men accused of drug smuggling were also returned to the United States.
- October 28 - vice presidential candidate George Bush campaigned with William Clay Ford and William Milliken on the assembly line at Ford's Dearborn engine plant. Bush told auto workers, "We can do better than Carter. We can't do any worse."
- October 31 – The Detroit City Council approved a plan to send relocation offers to Poletown residents to make room for General Motors' planned assembly plant. Poletown residents accused the council of selling out to GM. Attorneys representing businesses to be displaced threatened litigation.

=== November ===
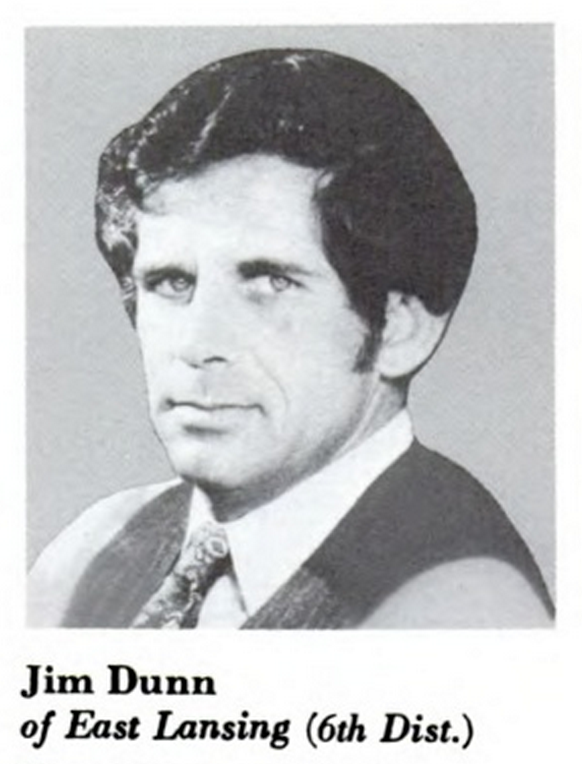

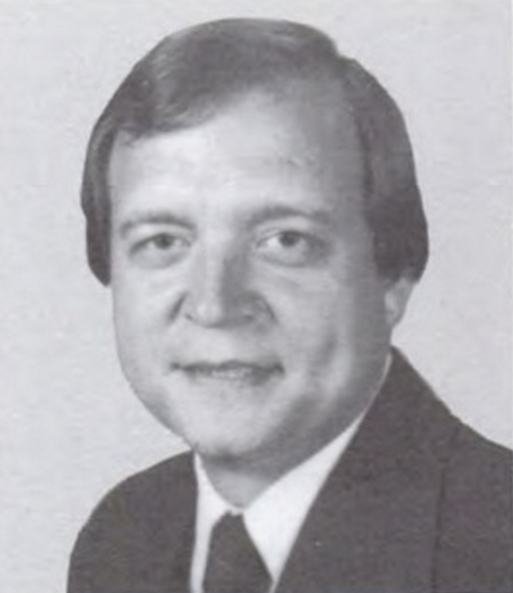

- November 1–3 - The presidential candidates made last-minute appearances in Michigan. On November 1, Ronald Reagan campaigned in Battle Creek, Saginaw, and Pontiac with Gerald Ford and Gov. William Milliken. On November 2, Sen. Ted Kennedy and Vice President Walter Mondale appeared at a rally of 12,000 persons in support of Jimmy Carter at Cobo Hall in Detroit. On November 3, Carter appeared in Metro Detroit and urged John Anderson supporters to vote for him to avoid swinging the election to a "right wing Republican administration."
- November 4 –

* Ronald Reagan defeated incumbent President Jimmy Carter in the 1980 presidential election. Reagan carried Michigan with 48.99% of the vote to 42.5% for Carter and 7.04% for John B. Anderson.
* The Tisch proposal to cut property taxes was defeated. On November 21, Tisch warned that, if the state did not enact property tax reform by the following September, he would seek to put another initiative on the 1982 ballot.
* In the House of Representatives elections, 16 incumbents were reelected. The Sixth District was the only district to change parties, as Republican businessman James Dunn upset incumbent Democratic Congressman Bob Carr. In the 13th District, Democrat George W. Crockett Jr. won a special election to immediately replace Charles Diggs and to serve a full two-year term starting in January. In the 14th District, Democrat Dennis M. Hertel defeated television newsman Vic Caputo to claim the seat previously held by Lucien N. Nedzi.
* Ballot proposals to lower Michigan's drinking age to 19 and build four new prisons were defeated by voters.

- November 7 - American Motors reported a loss of $84.9 million in the quarter ending in September, concluding the worst fiscal year in the company's history.
- November 10 - The U.S. International Trade Commission rejected a claim by Ford Motor and the UAW and refused to impose trade barriers on imported cars.
- November 20 - Attorney General Frank Kelley issued arrest warrants for 27 Detroit residents for welfare fraud. The state used computers to identify 225 individuals who were receiving welfare benefits while employed.
- November 22 - Michigan defeated Ohio State, 9–3, to win the Big Ten championship and secure a berth in the Rose Bowl. The Wolverines' defense held Art Schlichter and Cal Murray in check and prevented an opponent from scoring a touchdown for the fourth consecutive game.
- November 24 - The Detroit Red Wings fired Ted Lindsay as the team's coach and replaced him with Wayne Maxner.
- November 24 - Lee Iacocca reported that Chrysler made a profit in October, the first month in two years in which it recorded a profit.
- November 25 - J. L. Hudson, Jr., stepped down as CEO of J. L. Hudson Co., the department store chain founded by his grand uncle. It was the first time that the company in its 100-year history had not been run by a member of the Hudson family. Hudson, who said the move was not initiated by him, remained with the company primarily in a community and civic relations role. The company became part of publicly traded Dayton Hudson Corp. in 1969.
- November 25 - Ford Motor settled a race and sex discrimination suit brought in 1973 by the federal government. Ford agreed to pay $13 million in damages to existing employees and to spend a further $10 million on training and affirmative action programs to assist minority workers move up within the company.
- November 27 - Detroit's Thanksgiving Parade took place in a snowstorm in downtown Detroit before a crowd of 300,000.

=== December ===
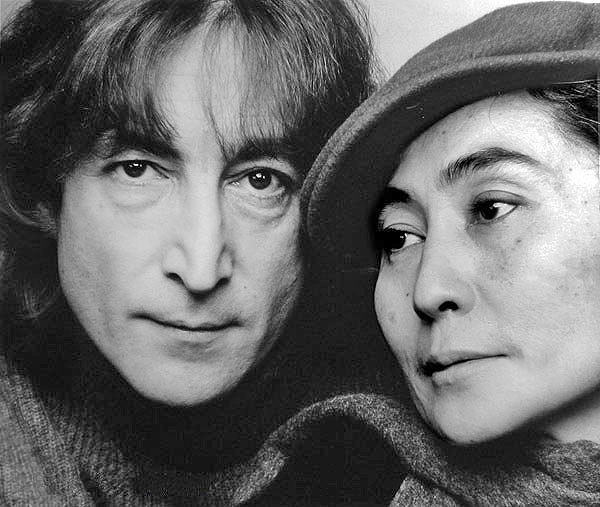
John Lennon in 1980

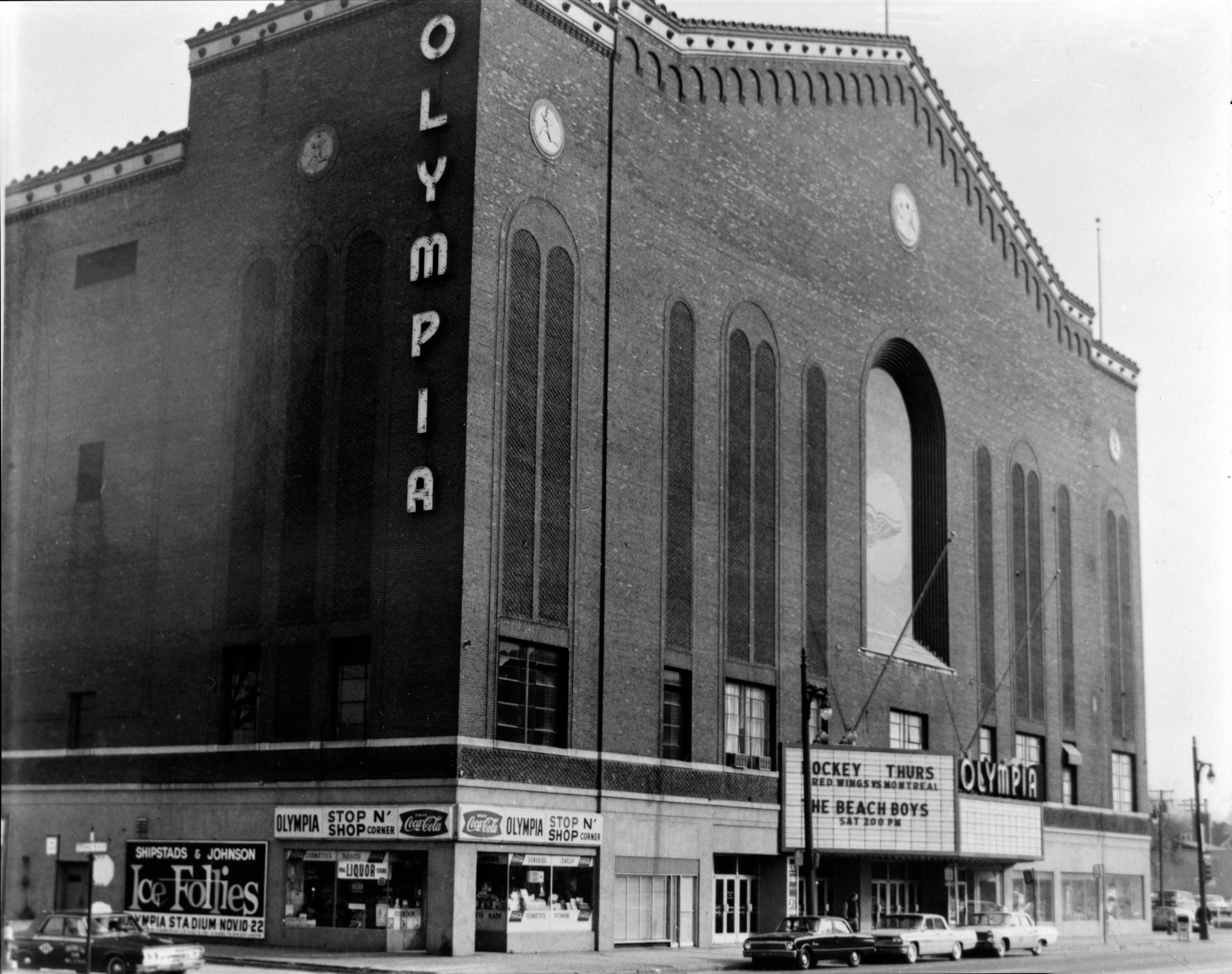
Olympia Stadium

- December 9 - Wayne County Circuit Judge George T. Martin rejected a suit by the Poletown Neighborhood Council seeking to halt the city's seizure of property to make way for a General Motors plant. An economics professor had testified on November 25 that the estimated $199.7 million cost to the city greatly outweighed the $99.6 million in property and income taxes that it would generate over 20 years. On December 1, Detroit Mayor Young testified, calling the plant the most important project undertaken in Detroit since he became mayor in 1974.
- December 11 - Ronald Reagan named Michigan Congressman David Stockman as his Director of the Office of Management and Budget.
- December 15 - 1,500 gathered at Kennedy Square in Detroit in a prayer for John Lennon who was killed in New York on December 8.
- December 16 - A survey by the Department of Labor showed that seven of the top ten areas in the country for unemployment were located in Michigan. Flint ranked highest with a 16.4% unemployment rate. Bay City ranked second at 15%. Muskegon, Detroit, Saginaw, Jackson, and Battle Creek also ranked in the top ten.
- December 17 - Mayor Coleman Young of Detroit apologized for calling Ronald Reagan "pruneface from the West" during the presidential campaign. Young stated that his comment was simply campaign rhetoric.
- December 17 - Chrysler issued a new survival plan calling for wage freezes from workers, price freezes from suppliers, debt conversion by lenders and cutbacks in new products. Chrysler on December 23 also filed for another $400 million in loan guarantees.
- December 17 - Detroit City Council approved the purchase of Olympia Stadium for $373,513 and agreed to pay $3.6 million to Olympia Stadium Corp. for past and future improvements to Joe Louis Arena.
- December 18 - Urban population figures released by the Census Bureau showed that Houston had passed Detroit as the country's fifth largest city.
- December 18 - Wayne County Circuit Judge James Montante ordered the Michigan State Police to release files maintained by its "Red Squad" on individuals and organizations who were spied on over four decades from the early 1930s to the early 1970s.
- December 23 - Projections from the Japanese Automobile Manufacturers Association indicated that Japan, with 11 million cars, trucks and buses manufactured in 1980, would overtake the United States as the world's leading manufacturer of automobiles.

== Births ==
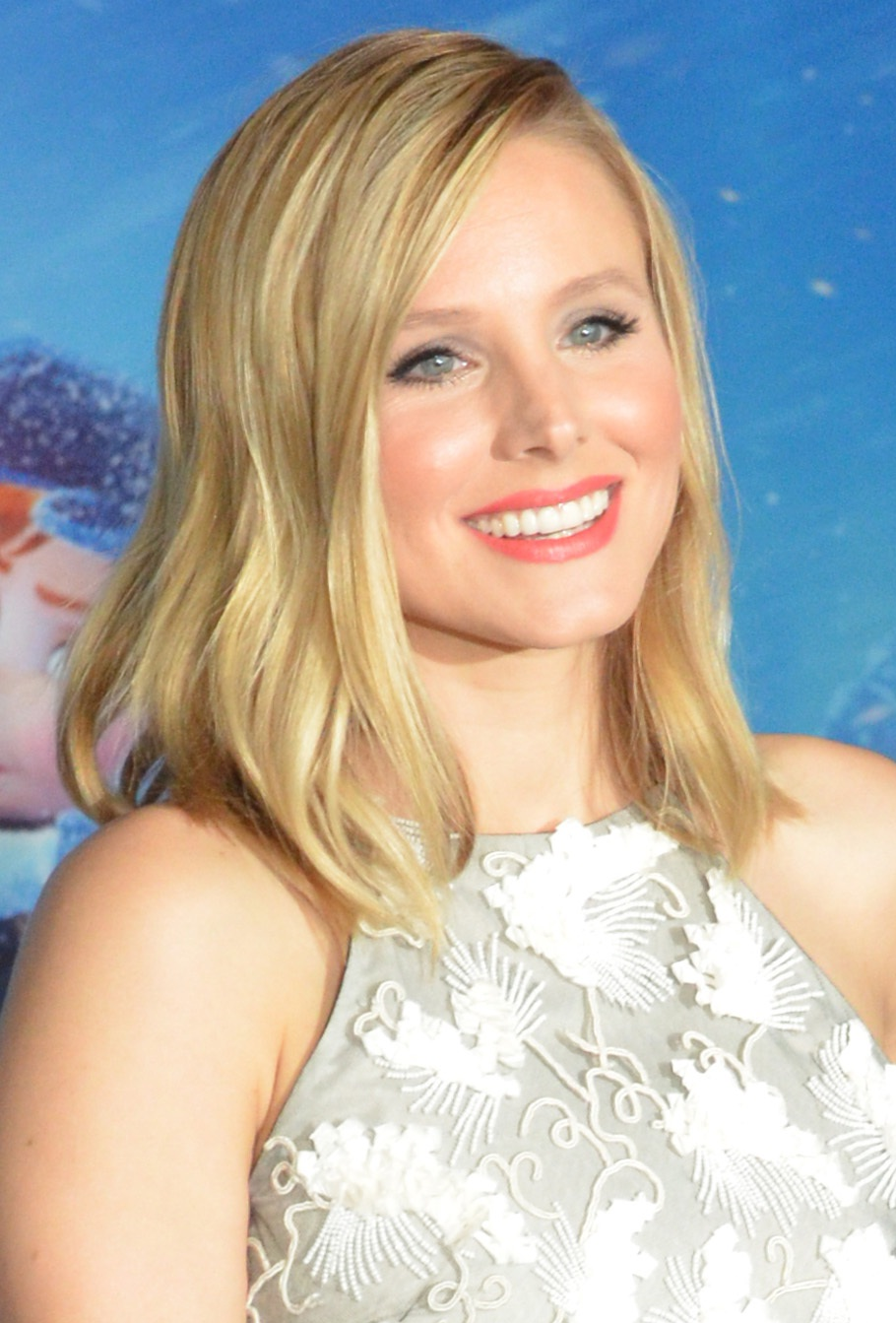
Kristen Bell

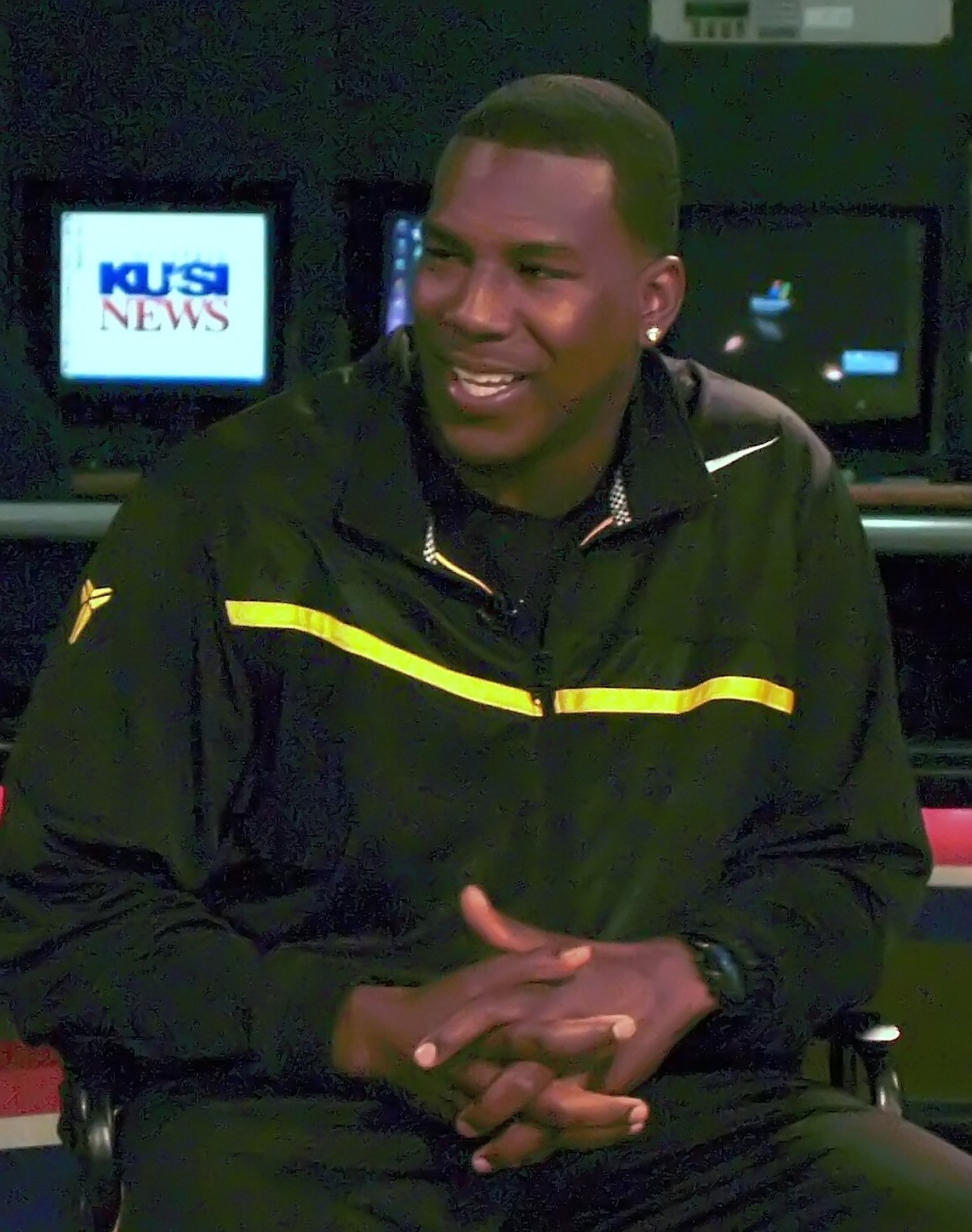
Antonio Gates

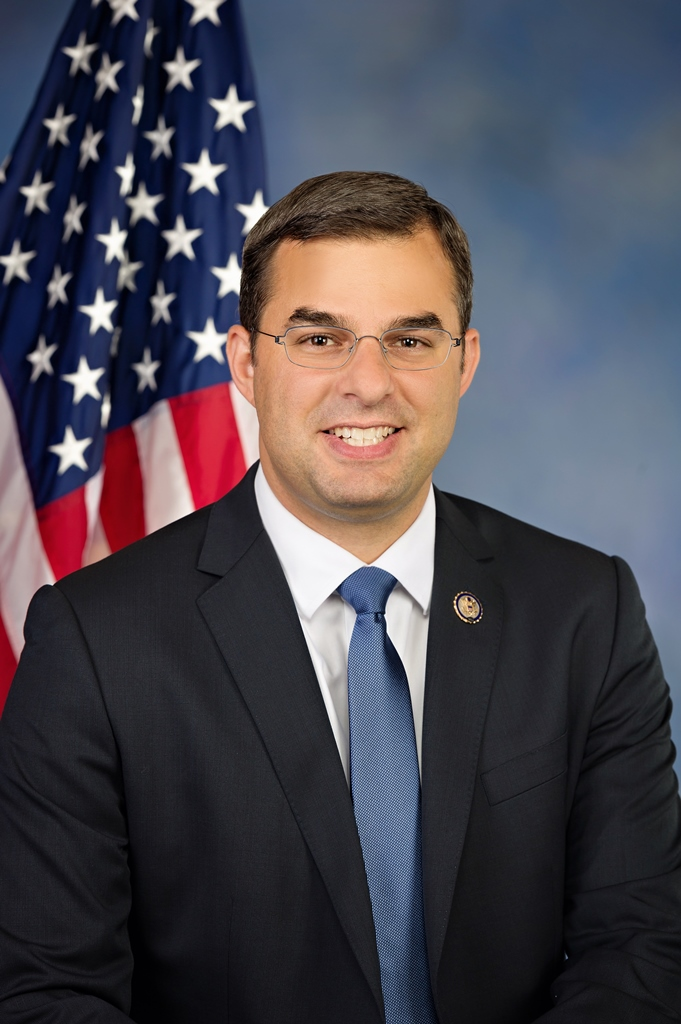
Justin Amash

- January 11 – Guilty Simpson, rapper, in Detroit
- February 6 – Konnor (born Ryan Parmeter, aka Conor O'Brian), professional wrestler, in Grand Rapids
- February 19 – David Kircus, American football wide receiver in NHL (2003–2004, 2006), in Mount Clemens
- April 18 – Justin Amash, Congressman from Michigan's 3rd district since 2011, in Grand Rapids
- April 18 – Rick Johnson, bass player for Mustard Plug, in Muskegon
- April 24 – Austin Nichols, actor (One Tree Hill and The Walking Dead), in Ann Arbor
- May 24 – Jason Babin, American football linebacker in NFL (2004–2015), in Kalamazoo
- June 5 – Ryan Devlin, actor (Brothers & Sisters Season 5), in Grand Rapids
- June 12 – Larry Foote, American football linebacker in NFL (2002–2014), in Detroit
- June 18 – Antonio Gates, American football tight end selected to the NFL 2000s All-Decade Team, in Detroit
- June 18 – Anthony Adams, American football defensive tackle in NFL (2003–2011), in Detroit
- July 3 – Bradlee Van Pelt, American football quarterback in NFL (2005), in Owosso
- July 10 – Brian Mast, former Army Ranger who lost both legs in Afghanistan, Congressman from Florida's 17th district, in Grand Rapids
- July 17 – Ryan Miller, ice hockey goaltender in NHL (2002–2017), in East Lansing
- July 18 – Kristen Bell, actress (Veronica Mars, Forgetting Sarah Marshall, Frozen), in Huntington Woods
- August 3 – Todd Simon, head basketball coach at Southern Utah, in Fowler
- August 14 – Adam Hall, ice hockey right wing in NHL (2001–2014), in Kalamazoo
- August 17 – David Legwand, ice hockey center in NHL (1998–2016), in Detroit
- August 18 – Bart Scott, American football linebacker in NFL (2002–2012), in Detroit
- August 26 – Keith O'Neil, American football linebacker in NFL (2003–2006), in Rochester
- September 25 – Chris Owen, actor (The Sherminator in the American Pie film franchise), in Michigan
- September 30 – Toni Trucks, actress (Barbershop, Franklin & Bash), in Grand Rapids
- October 18 – Josh Gracin, country music singer (#1 hit in 2004 with "Nothin' to Lose"), in Westland
- October 28 – Calvin Pace, American football linebacker in NFL (2003–2015), in Detroit
- October 29 – Heidi Androl, television sports reporter and reality television performer, in Unionville
- November 21 – Danielle Hartsell, pair figure skater and U.S. champion with brother Steve Hartsell (1999), in Ann Arbor
- December 3 – Jim Sorgi, American football quarterback for Indianapolis Colts (2004–2009), in Fraser
- December 8 – Lisa Kelly, trucker and reality TV (Ice Road Truckers), in Grand Rapids

=== Gallery of 1980 births ===
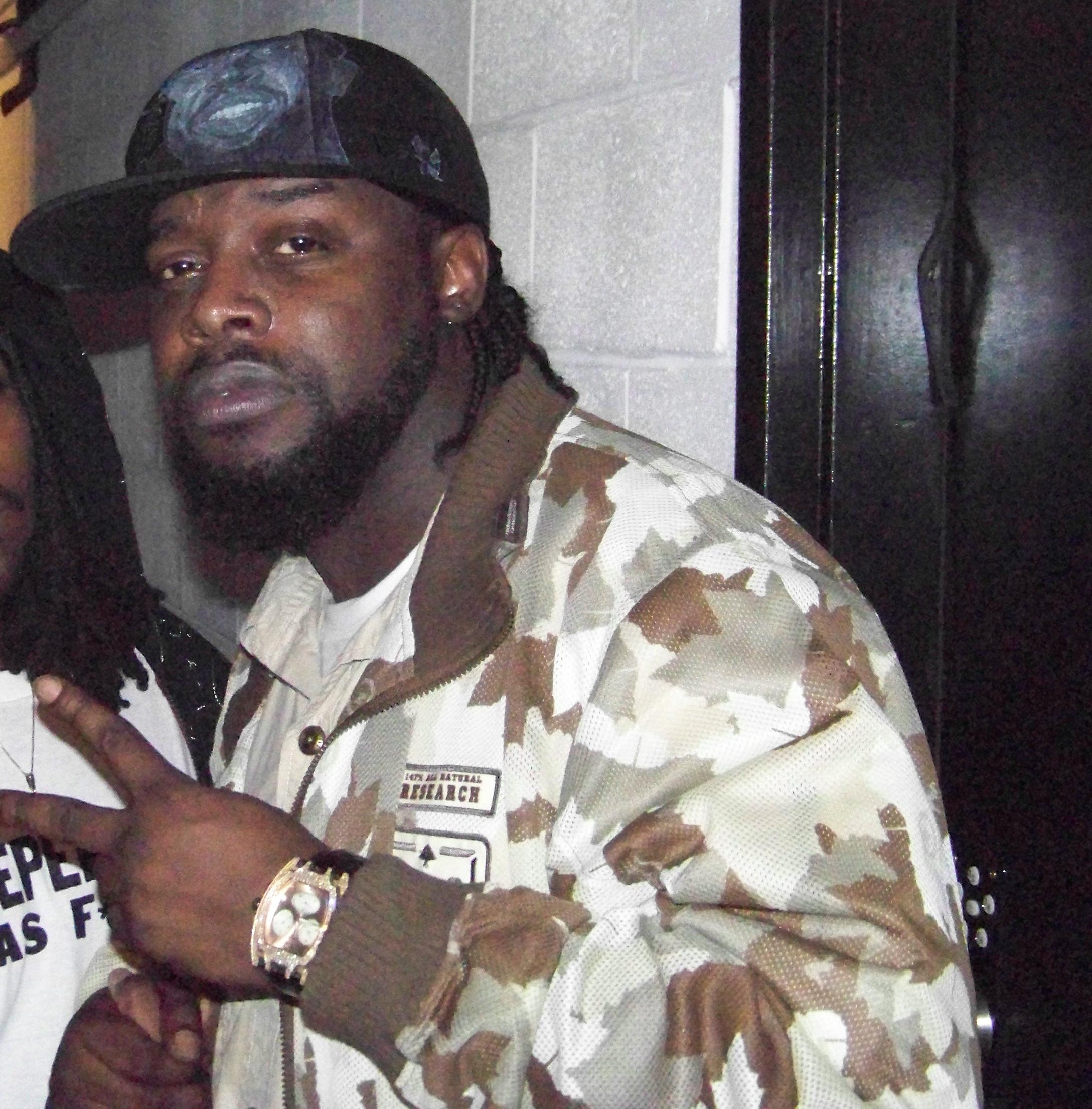
Guilty Simpson

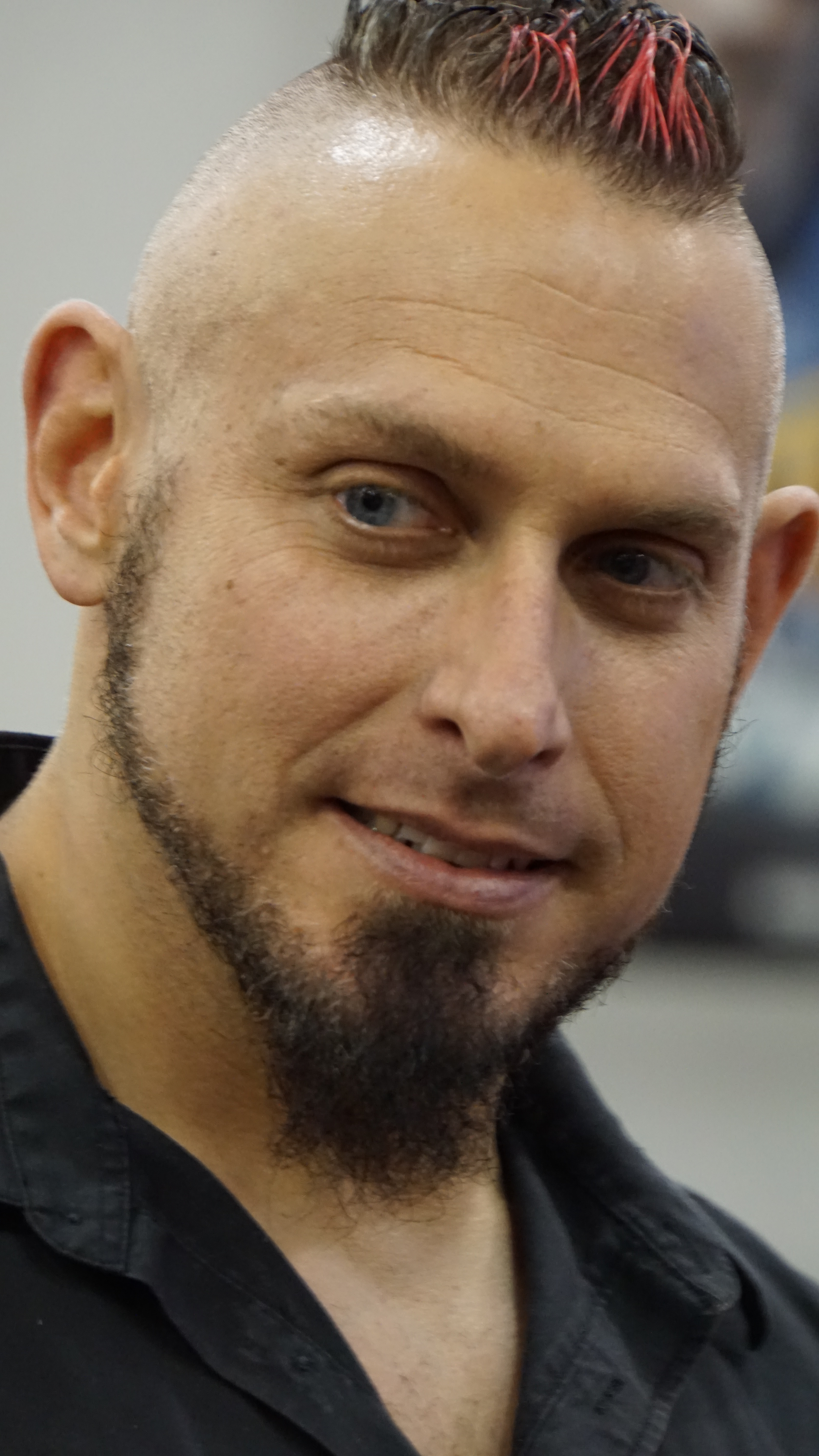
Konnor

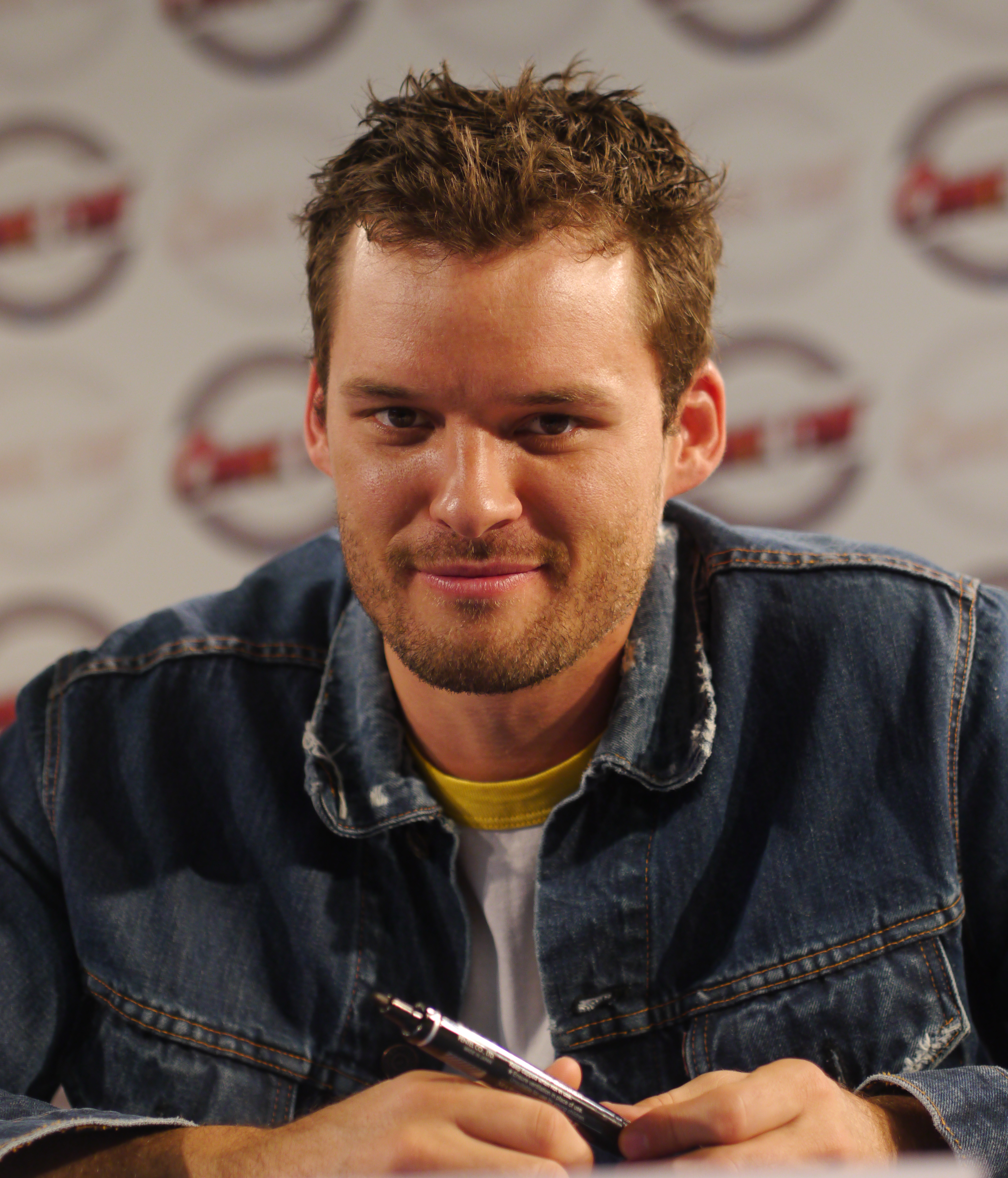
Austin Nichols

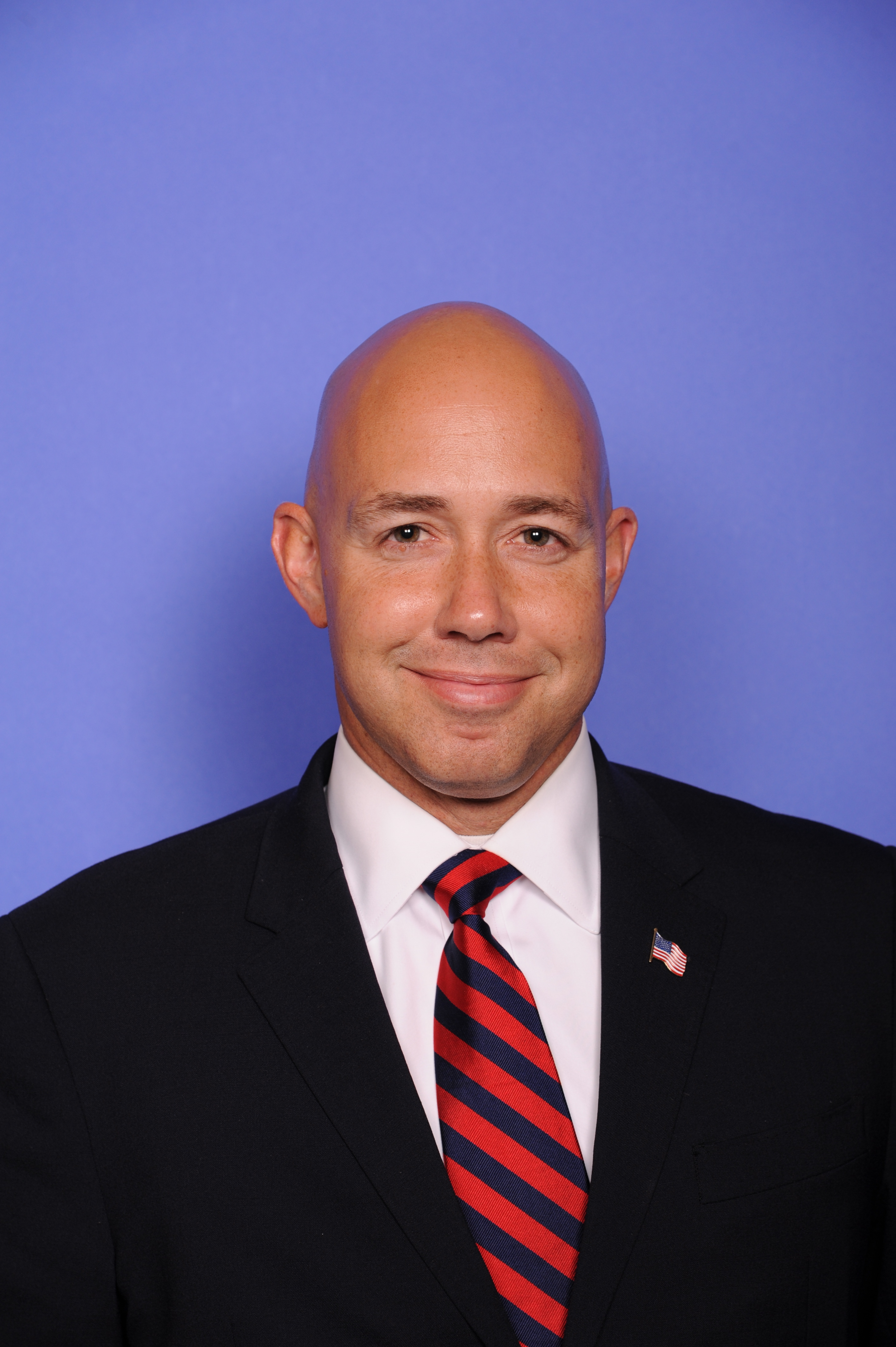
Brian Mast

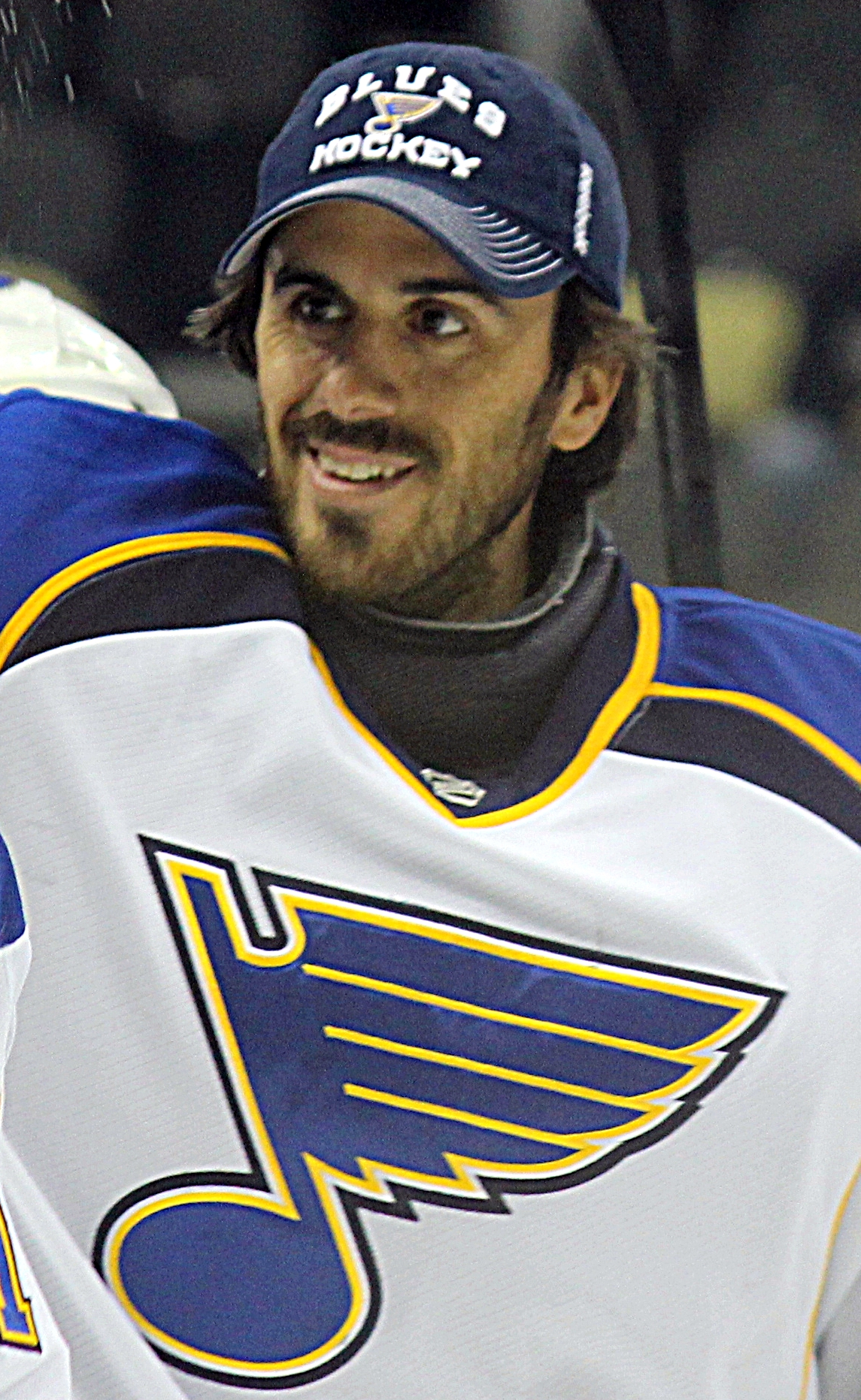
Ryan Miller

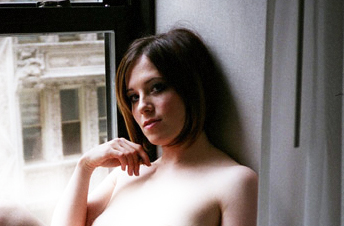
Tatum Reed

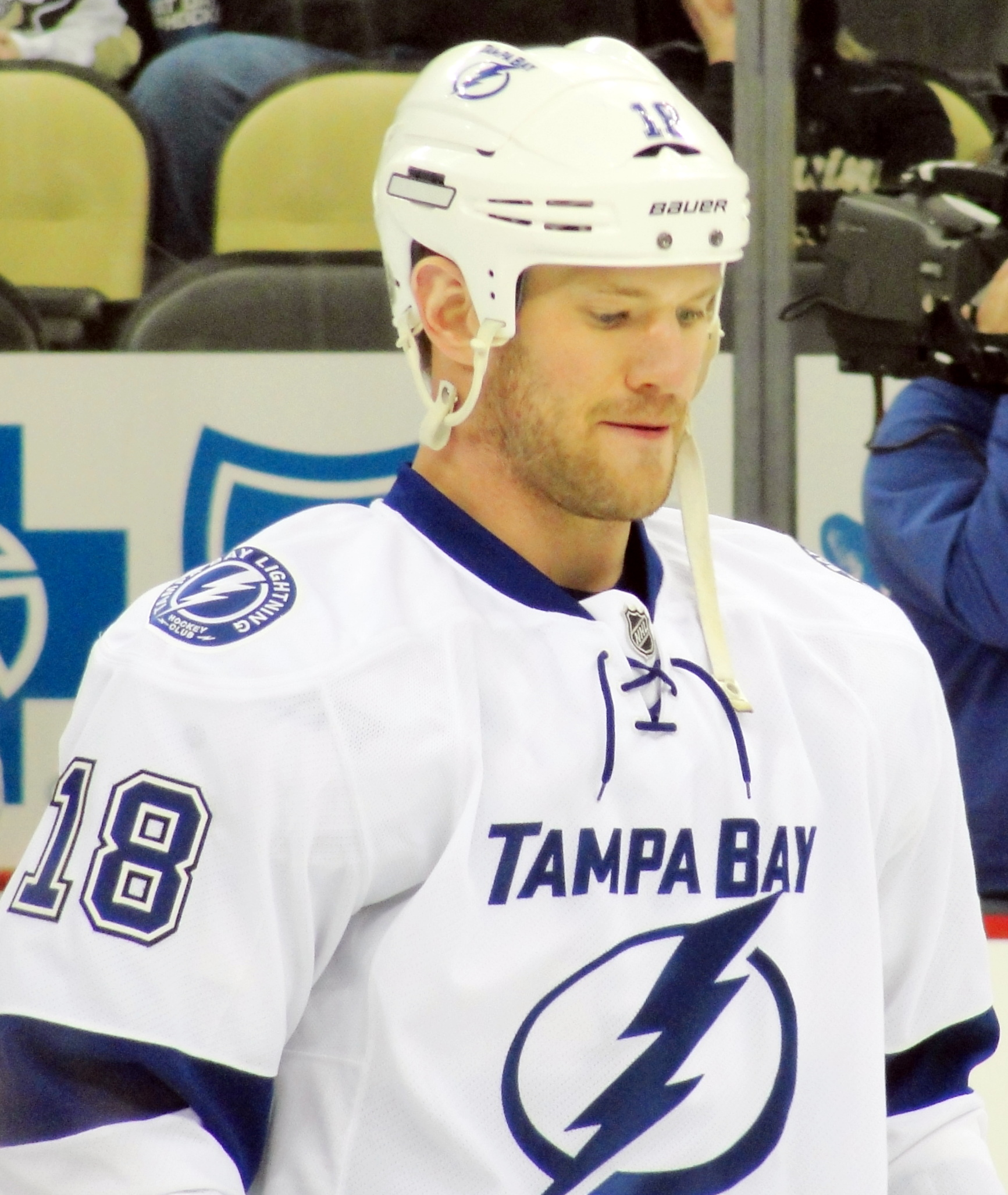
Adam Hall

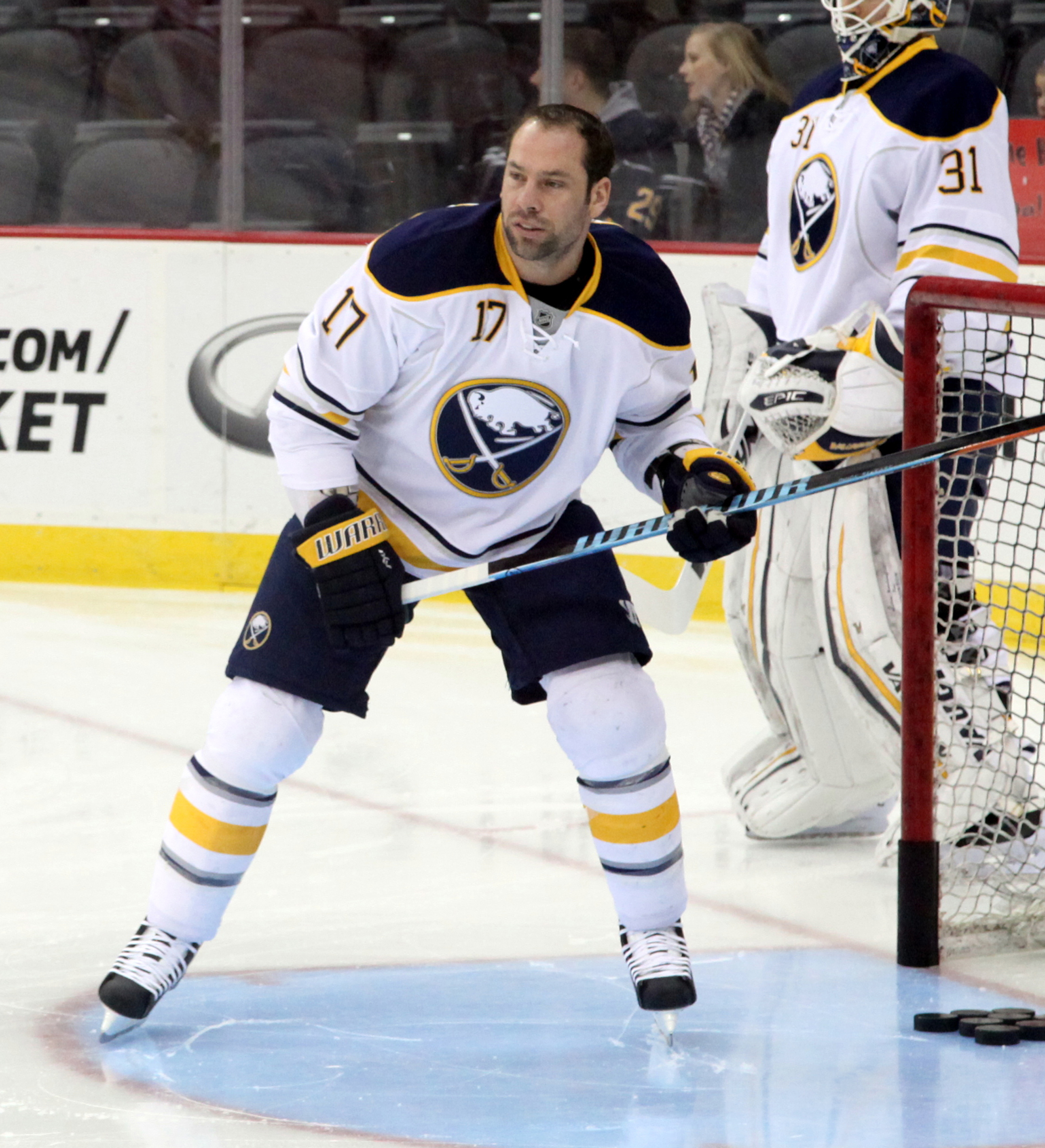
David Legwand

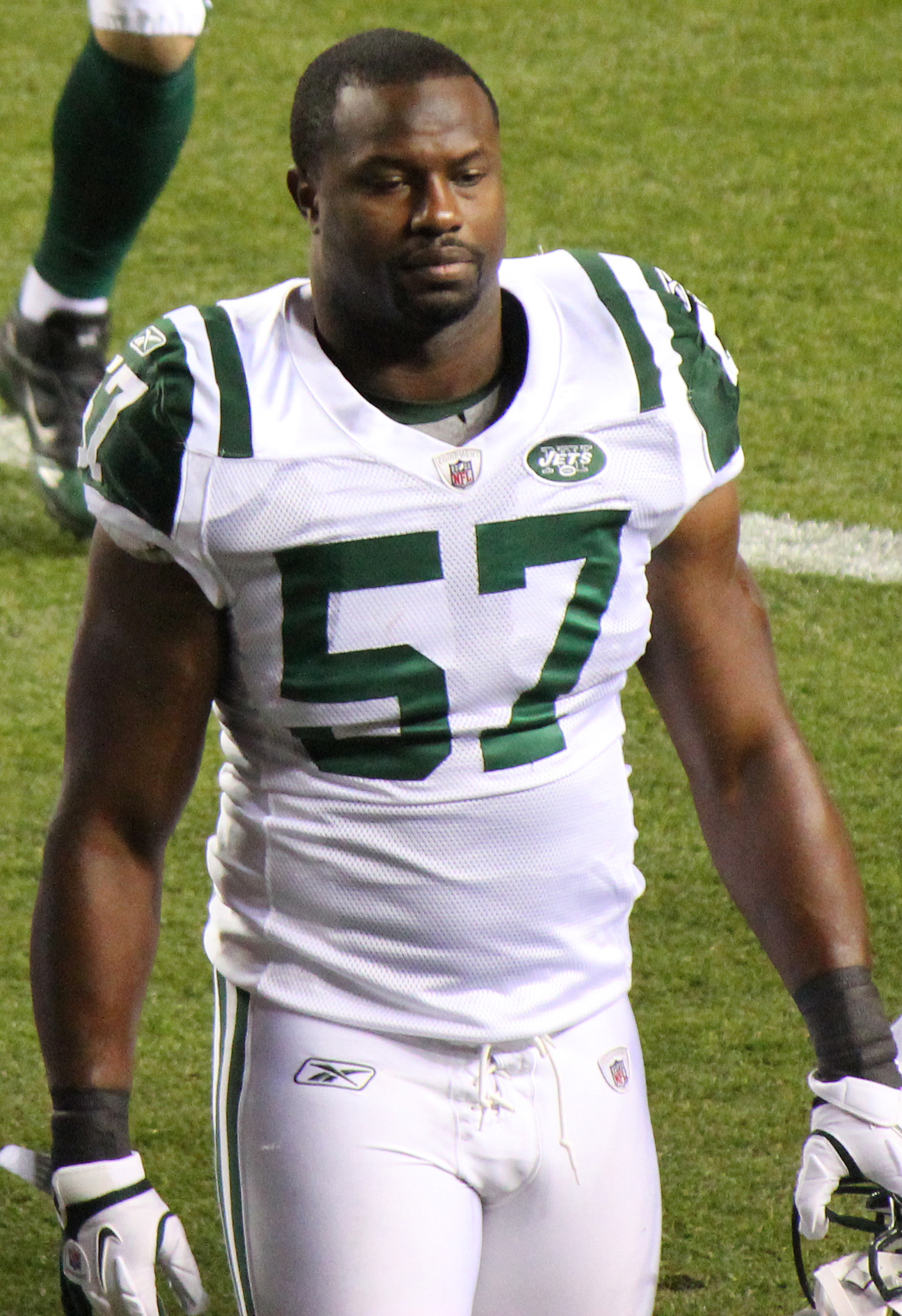
Bart Scott

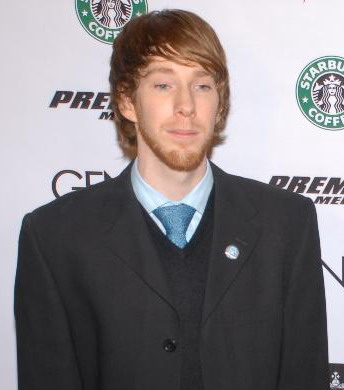
Chris Owen

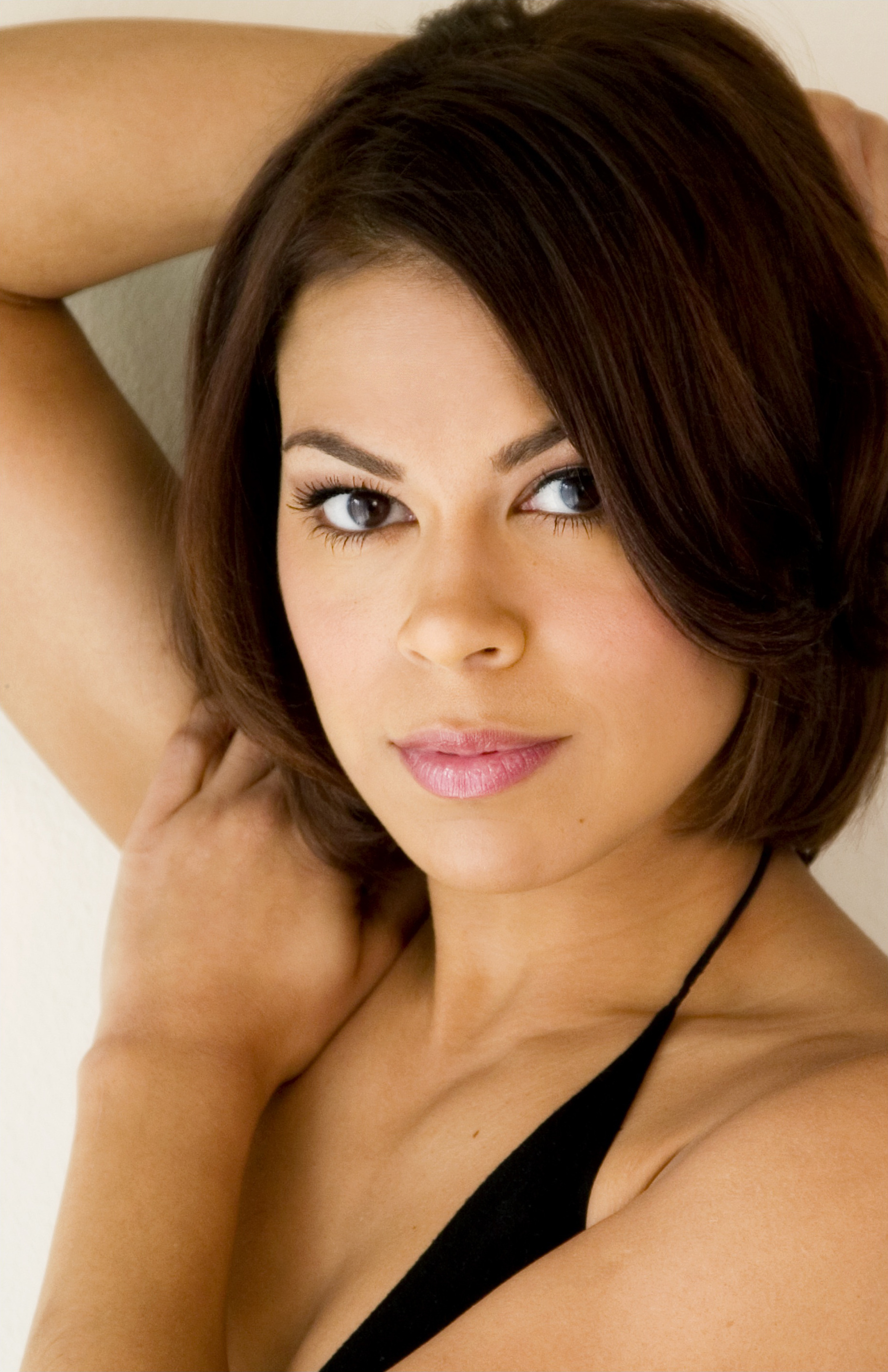
Toni Trucks

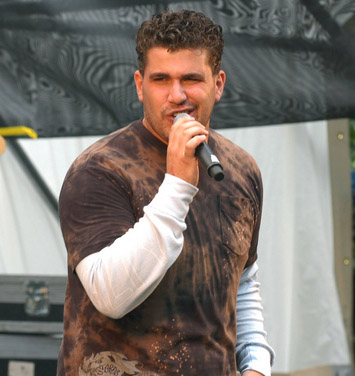
Josh Gracin

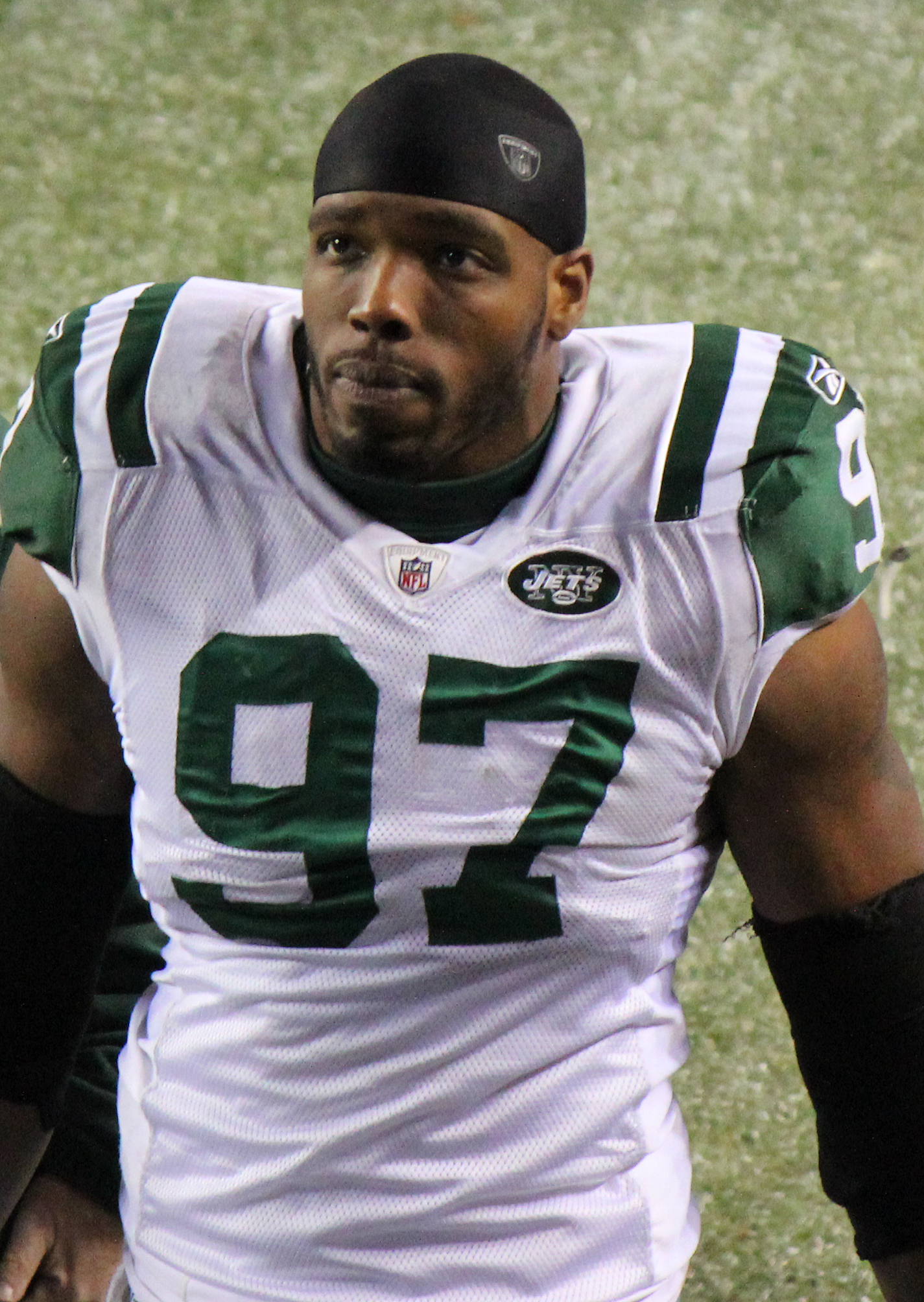
Calvin Pace

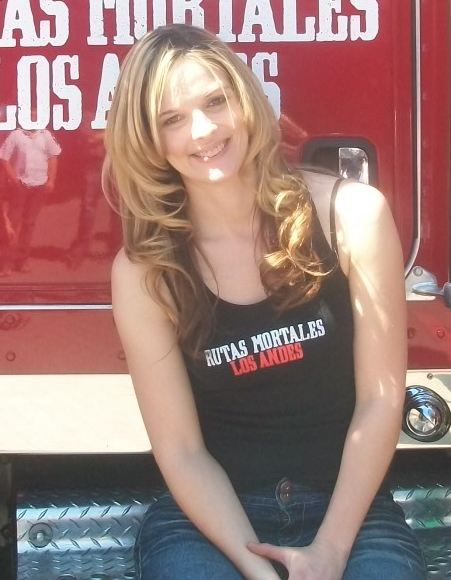
Lisa Kelly

== Deaths ==
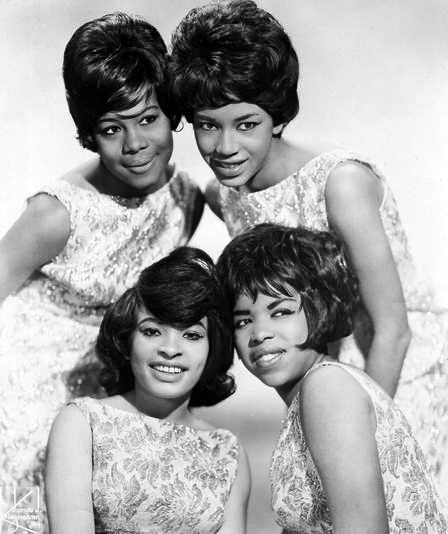
The Marvelettes

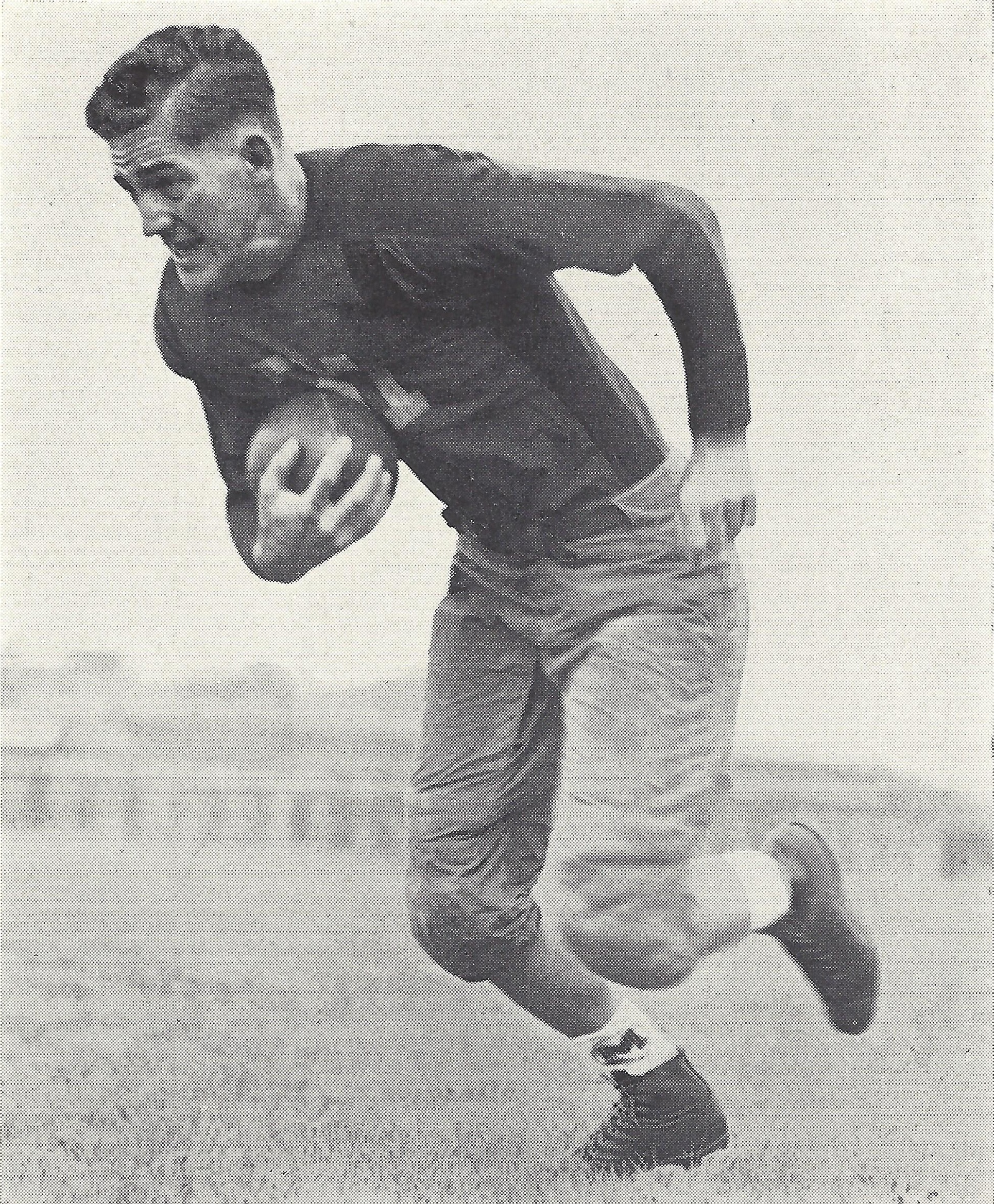
Herman Everhardus

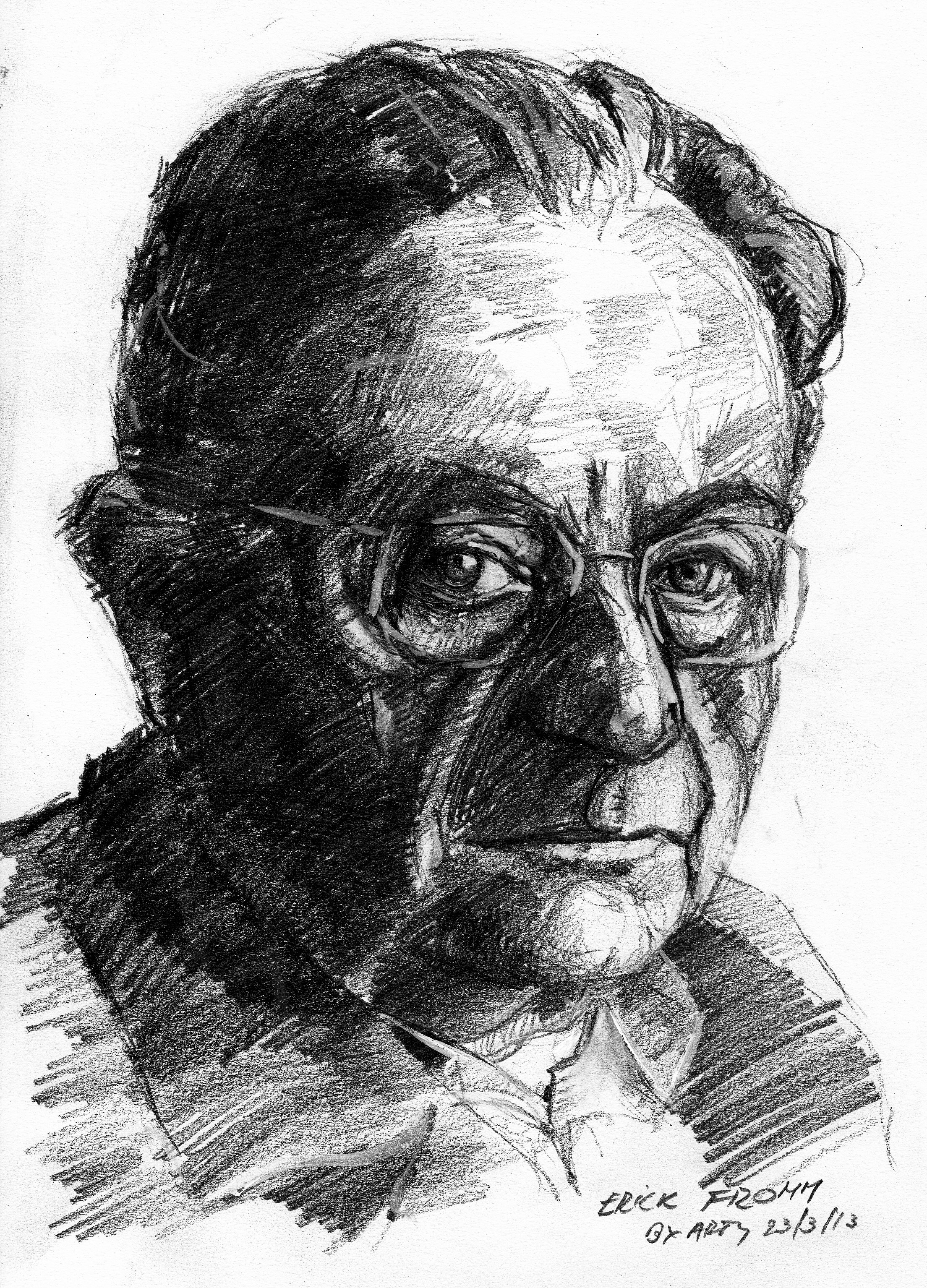
Erich Fromm

- January 6 – Georgeanna Tillman, singer and original member of The Marvelettes, at age 35 in Inkster
- January 6 – Joe Mendi II, a performing chimpanzee that entertained patrons at the Detroit Zoo since 1943, at age 40 in Detroit
- January 23 – Nate Shapero, owner of the Cunningham chain of pharmacies, in Palm Beach at age 87
- January 29 – Bruce Bromley, famed New York lawyer who was born in Pontiac and graduated from the University of Michigan, in New York City at age 86
- February 14 – Victor Gruen, designer of the Northland Mall in Detroit and the Kalamazoo Mall, the first pedestrian street mall, in Vienna at age 76
- February 14 – Ricky Knotts, NASCAR driver from Paw Paw, in a crash at Daytona at age 28
- February 16 – George Pierrot, television host and director of the Detroit Institute of Arts' World Adventure travelogue series for 46 years, in Detroit at age 82
- February 25 – Robert Hayden, poet and essayist, in Ann Arbor at age 66
- March 10 – James M. Hare, Michigan Secretary of State 1955 to 1970, in Venice, Florida
- March 16 – Tony Basso, aka "Raincoat Tony", "a Detroit legend" who directed traffic for more than 20 years while wearing an orange raincoat in front of the Book Cadillac Hotel, in Detroit at age 62
- March 18 – Erich Fromm, psychologist and philosopher, taught at Michigan State University (1957–1961), in Switzerland at age 79
- March 21 – Ralph Ulveling, librarian and advocate of intellectual freedom, in Boynton Beach, Florida, at age 77
- May 5 – Homer Stryker, medical equipment inventor and founder of Stryker Corporation, in Kalamazoo at age 85
- May 18 – Robert J. Dunne, American football player and coach and judge, in Winnetka, Illinois, at age 80
- May 23 - Terry Furlow, basketball player at Michigan State, in an automobile accident at Linndale, Ohio, at age 25
- July 16 - Herman Everhardus, American football halfback, in Okemos at age 67
- August 1 - Strother Martin, actor who competed as a diver at University of Michigan, in Thousand Oaks, California, at age 61
- August 16 - James Dallas Egbert III, student at Michigan State, in Dayton, Ohio, at age 17
- August 26 – Jimmy Forrest, jazz musician known for his #1 hit "Night Train", in Grand Rapids at age 60
- September 10 – William Clemens, film director, in Los Angeles at age 74
- September 13 – Josephine Hoffa, wife of Jimmy Hoffa, in Detroit at age 62
- October 8 – Pearl Kendrick, bacteriologist and co-developer of the whooping cough vaccine, in Grand Rapids at age 90
- October 9 – Theophil Henry Hildebrandt, mathematician, in Ann Arbor at age 92
- October 23 – Bob Westfall, American football fullback, in Adrian at age 61
- November 21 – A. J. M. Smith, poet and anthologist, taught at Michigan State 1936–1972, in East Lansing at age 78
- December 1 - Bob Irvin, editor of Autoweek and Automotive News, in Chicago at age 47
- December 15 – Angus Campbell, pioneer in political measurement and director of Institute for Social Research, in Ann Arbor at age 70
- December 22 – Karl Schlademan, track and field coach at Michigan State 1940–1958, in Fort Wayne, Indiana, at age 90
- December 26 – Bill Crouch, baseball pitcher and coach at Eastern Michigan University (1947–1969), in Howell at age 73

== See also ==
- History of Michigan
- History of Detroit
