= 1980 Ohio State Buckeyes football team =

American college football season

1980 Ohio State Buckeyes football

Fiesta Bowl, L 19–31 vs. Penn State
- Conference: Big Ten Conference

Ranking
- Coaches: No. 15
- AP: No. 15
- Record: 9–3 (7–1 Big Ten)
- Head coach: Earle Bruce (2nd season)
- Offensive coordinator: Glen Mason (1st season)
- Defensive coordinator: Dennis Fryzel (2nd season)
- MVP: Calvin Murray
- Captains: Doug Donley; Ray Ellis; Keith Ferguson; Calvin Murray
- Home stadium: Ohio Stadium

1980 Big Ten Conference football standings
	Conf.					Overall
Team	W		L		T	W		L		T
No. 4 Michigan $	8	–	0	–	0	10	–	2	–	0
No. 15 Ohio State	7	–	1	–	0	9	–	3	–	0
No. 17 Purdue	7	–	1	–	0	9	–	3	–	0
Iowa	4	–	4	–	0	4	–	7	–	0
Minnesota	4	–	5	–	0	5	–	6	–	0
Indiana	3	–	5	–	0	6	–	5	–	0
Wisconsin	3	–	5	–	0	4	–	7	–	0
Illinois	3	–	5	–	0	3	–	7	–	1
Michigan State	2	–	6	–	0	3	–	8	–	0
Northwestern	0	–	9	–	0	0	–	11	–	0
$ – Conference champion; Rankings from AP Poll

The 1980 Ohio State Buckeyes football team was an American football team that represented the Ohio State University as a member of the Big Ten Conference during the 1980 Big Ten season. In their second season under head coach Earle Bruce, the Buckeyes began the season ranked No. 1 in the pre-season AP poll. They finished in a tie for second place in the Big Ten, compiled a 9–3 record (7–1 in conference games), and outscored opponents by a total of 368 to 150. They lost to Penn State in the 1980 Fiesta Bowl and were ranked No. 15 in the final AP poll.

The team's statistical leaders included:

- Quarterback Art Schlichter ranked second in the Big Ten with a 139.7 passing efficiency rating and 22 total touchdowns and third with 1,930 passing yards, a 54.0% pass completion percentage, and 2,255 total yards.
- Running back Calvin Murray led the Big Ten with 1,267 rushing yards, 1,471 yards from scrimmage, and 6.5 yards per rushing attempt.
- Wide receiver Doug Donley led the Big Ten with 20.6 yard per reception and fifth with 887 receiving yards.
- Placekicker Vlade Janakievski led the Big Ten with 90 points scored and 45 extra points made and second with 15 field goals made.

Nine Ohio State players received first-team honors on the 1980 All-Big Ten Conference football team: Murray (AP/UPI); Donley (AP/UPI); Janikievski (AP/UPI); guard Joe Lukens (AP/UPI); linebacker Marcus Marek (AP/UPI); defensive backs Ray Ellis (AP/UPI), Vince Skillings (UPI), and Todd Bell (UPI); and defensive lineman Jerome Foster (AP).

The team played its home games at Ohio Stadium in Columbus, Ohio.

== Schedule ==
Date	Time	Opponent	Rank	Site	TV	Result	Attendance	Source
September 13	1:30 p.m.	Syracuse*	No. 1	Ohio Stadium; Columbus, OH		W 31–21	86,643	
September 20	1:30 p.m.	Minnesota	No. 2	Ohio Stadium; Columbus, OH	ABC	W 47–0	87,916	
September 27	1:30 p.m.	No. 20 Arizona State*	No. 2	Ohio Stadium; Columbus, OH		W 38–21	88,097	
October 4	1:30 p.m.	No. 11 UCLA*	No. 2	Ohio Stadium; Columbus, OH	ABC	L 0–17	88,084	
October 11	2:00 p.m.	at Northwestern	No. 9	Dyche Stadium; Evanston, IL		W 63–0	29,375	
October 18	1:30 p.m.	Indiana	No. 9	Ohio Stadium; Columbus, OH		W 27–17	87,957	
October 25	2:30 p.m.	at Wisconsin	No. 10	Camp Randall Stadium; Madison, WI		W 21–0	79,253	
November 1	1:00 p.m.	at Michigan State	No. 9	Spartan Stadium; East Lansing, MI		W 48–16	77,153	
November 8	1:30 p.m.	Illinois	No. 7	Ohio Stadium; Columbus, OH (Illibuck)		W 49–42	87,952	
November 15	2:00 p.m.	at Iowa	No. 7	Kinnick Stadium; Iowa City, IA		W 41–7	59,890	
November 22	12:30 p.m.	No. 10 Michigan	No. 5	Ohio Stadium; Columbus, OH (rivalry)	ABC	L 3–9	88,827	
December 26	3:00 p.m.	vs. No. 10 Penn State*	No. 11	Sun Devil Stadium; Tempe, AZ (Fiesta Bowl, rivalry)	NBC	L 19–31	66,738	
*Non-conference game; Rankings from AP Poll released prior to the game; All times are in Eastern time

== Game summaries ==
=== Syracuse ===
Syracuse Orangemen (0–0) at #1 Ohio State Buckeyes (0–0)

Quarter	1	2	3	4	Total
Syracuse	14	7	0	0	21
Ohio State	3	6	15	7	31

at Ohio Stadium, Columbus, Ohio

- Date: September 13
- Game time: 1:30 p.m.
- Game weather: Hazy, 85 °F (29 °C)
- Game attendance: 86,643
- Box Score

Game information

First quarter

- SYR – Tony Sidor 21-yard pass from Dave Warner (Gary Anderson kick), 10:47. Syracuse 7–0. Drive: 8 plays, 80 yards, 4:13.
- SYR – Chris Jilleba 4-yard pass from Dave Warner (Gary Anderson kick), 9:10. Syracuse 14–0. Drive: 3 plays, 4 yards, 1:23.
- OSU – Vlade Janakievski 35-yard field goal, 3:08. Syracuse 14–3. Drive: 14 plays, 62 yards, 6:02.

Second quarter

- SYR – Dave Warner 1-yard run (Gary Anderson kick), 13:38. Syracuse 21–3. Drive: 10 plays, 80 yards, 4:30.
- OSU – Vlade Janakievski 34-yard field goal, 3:36. Syracuse 21–6. Drive: 11 plays, 70 yards, 3:39.
- OSU – Vlade Janakievski 42-yard field goal, 0:10. Syracuse 21–9. Drive: 9 plays, 46 yards, 1:39.

Third quarter

- OSU – Doug Donley 37-yard pass from Art Schlichter (Vlade Janakievski kick), 12:45. Syracuse 21–16. Drive: 6 plays, 80 yards, 2:15.
- OSU – Ricky Johnson 4-yard run (pass good), 4:39. Ohio State 24–21. Drive: 10 plays, 81 yards, 4:08.

Fourth quarter

- OSU – Art Schlichter 10-yard run (Vlade Janakievski kick), 1:36. Ohio State 31–21. Drive: 9 plays, 62 yards, 4:21.

Top passers

- SYR – Dave Warner – 10/16, 91 yards, 2 TD, INT
- OSU – Art Schlichter – 7/13, 107 yards, TD, 2 INT

Top rushers

- SYR – Joe Morris – 26 rushes, 150 yards
- OSU – Calvin Murray – 18 rushes, 117 yards

Top receivers

- SYR – Tony Sidor – 7 receptions, 74 yards, TD
- OSU – Doug Donley – 2 receptions, 58 yards, TD

On September 13, Ohio State (AP No. 1) opened its season with a 31–21 victory over Syracuse at Ohio Stadium in Columbus. Despite being a 27-point underdog, Syracuse led, 21–9, at halftime. Ohio State's quarterback and Heisman Trophy candidate, Art Schlichter, threw two interceptions in the first half, and then led the Buckeyes to a 22-point comeback in the second half. After the close game with Syracuse, Ohio State dropped to No. 2 in the AP Poll as Alabama took over the No. 1 spot.

=== Minnesota ===
Team	1	2	3	4	Total
Minnesota	0	0	0	0	0
• Ohio St	10	23	14	0	47

- Date: September 20
- Location: Ohio Stadium
- Game attendance: 87,916

On September 20, Ohio State (AP No. 2) easily defeated Minnesota, 47–0, before the largest crowd (87,916) in Ohio Stadium history. Ohio State led, 33–0, at halftime in the one-sided contest. Minnesota running back Garry White fumbled twice, and quarterback Tim Salem threw three interceptions to help the Buckeyes' cause. After the game, Ohio State remained ranked No. 2 in the AP Poll.

=== Arizona State ===
Team	1	2	3	4	Total
Arizona St	0	0	7	14	21
• Ohio State	3	21	7	7	38

- Date: September 27
- Location: Ohio Stadium, Columbus, Ohio
- Game attendance: 88,097
- Source: Palm Beach Post

Scoring summary
1	OHST	Janakievski 20 yard field goal	OHST 3-0
2	OHST	Donley 23 yard pass from Schlichter (Janakievski kick)	OHST 10-0
2	OHST	Spencer 1 yard run (Janakievski kick)	OHST 17-0
2	OHST	Murray 1 yard run (Janakievski kick)	OHST 24-0
3	ASU	Weathers 3 yard pass from Pagel (Lewis kick)	OHST 24-7
3	OHST	Donley 10 yard pass from Schlichter (Janakievski kick)	OHST 31-7
4	ASU	Caldwell 46 yard blocked punt return (Lewis kick)	OHST 31-14
4	OHST	Williams 13 yard pass from Schlichter (Janakievski kick)	OHST 38-14
4	ASU	Mistler 12 yard pass from Pagel (Lewis kick)	OHST 38-21

On September 27, Ohio State (AP No. 2) defeated Arizona State (AP No. 20), 38–21, before a crowd of 88,097 at Ohio Stadium in Columbus, Ohio. Art Schlichter accounted for 310 yards of total offense, including 271 passing yards and three touchdown passes. Doug Donley caught six passes for 133 yard and two touchdowns. Ohio State totaled 591 yards of total offense, and Arizona State had 440 yards.

=== UCLA ===
Team	1	2	3	4	Total
• UCLA	3	0	14	0	17
Ohio St	0	0	0	0	0

- Date: October 4
- Location: Ohio Stadium

On October 4, Ohio State (AP No. 2) was shut out by UCLA (AP No. 11), 17–0. UCLA held Ohio State scoreless for the first time in the Buckeyes' last 25 games. Ohio State fell to No. 9 in the following week's AP Poll.

=== At Northwestern ===
Team	1	2	3	4	Total
• Ohio St	21	21	14	7	63
Northwestern	0	0	0	0	0

- Date: October 11
- Location: Dyche Stadium
- Game attendance: 29,375

On October 11, Ohio State defeated Northwestern, 63–0, before a homecoming crowd of 29,375 at Dyche Stadium in Evanston. Ohio State led, 42-0, at halftime. Ohio State had 575 total yards, including 418 rushing yards. Calvin Murray had 120 yards and three touchdowns on nine carries. The night before the game, Northwestern coach was served with a lawsuit filed by 22 African American players alleging racial discrimination.

=== Indiana ===
Team	1	2	3	4	Total
Indiana	7	3	0	7	17
• Ohio St	10	7	3	7	27

- Date: October 18
- Location: Ohio Stadium
- Game attendance: 87,957

On October 18, Ohio State (AP No. 9) defeated Indiana, 27–17, in Columbus. Ohio State running back Calvin Murray rushed for 224 yards, the fourth highest single-game tally in Ohio State history to that time, on 35 carries and scored two touchdowns on his 22nd birthday. Mike Harkrader rushed for 117 yards on 18 carries for the Hoosiers. Harkrader became the seventh leading rusher in Big Ten history with 3,034 yards.

=== Wisconsin ===
Team	1	2	3	4	Total
• Ohio St	7	14	0	0	21
Wisconsin	0	0	0	0	0

- Date: October 25
- Location: Camp Randall Stadium

On October 25, Ohio State (AP No. 10) defeated Wisconsin, 21–0, in Madison. Wisconsin's defense held Art Schlichter to 89 passing yards, but Ohio State scored touchdowns after two Wisconsin fumbles and an interception. After the game, Wisconsin coach Dave McClain said, "You can't make that many mistakes. I've never been so frustrated with the mistakes."

=== At Michigan State ===
Team	1	2	3	4	Total
• Ohio St	7	17	10	14	48
Michigan St	7	3	0	6	16

- Date: November 1
- Location: Spartan Stadium
- Game attendance: 77,153

On November 1, Ohio State (AP No. 9) defeated Michigan State, 48–16, in front of a crowd of 77,153 persons at Spartan Stadium in East Lansing. Ohio State tallied 603 total yards in the game, and the Buckeyes' 48 points was the most allowed by Michigan State since 1976.

=== Illinois ===
Team	1	2	3	4	Total
Illinois	0	7	21	14	42
• Ohio St	14	14	7	14	49

- Date: November 8
- Location: Ohio Stadium

On November 8, Ohio State (AP No. 7) narrowly defeated Illinois, 49–42, in Columbus. Illinois quarterback Dave Wilson set an NCAA single-season record with 621 passing yards. Art Schlichter threw four touchdown passes and broke the Ohio State career total yards record previously held by Archie Griffin.

=== At Iowa ===
Team	1	2	3	4	Total
• Ohio St	21	3	0	17	41
Iowa	0	7	0	0	7

- Date: November 15
- Location: Kinnick Stadium
- Game attendance: 59,890

On November 15, Ohio State easily defeated Iowa, 41–7, in Iowa City. Art Schlichter threw two touchdown passes, and Calvin Murray rushed for 183 yards to lead the Buckeyes.

=== Michigan ===
#10 Michigan Wolverines at #5 Ohio State Buckeyes

Quarter	1	2	3	4	Total
Michigan	0	3	6	0	9
Ohio State	0	3	0	0	3

at Ohio Stadium, Columbus, Ohio

- Date: November 22
- Game time: 12:45 p.m.
- Game weather: Sunny, 53 °F (12 °C)
- Game attendance: 88,827
- Referee: Gene Calhoun
- TV announcers (ABC): Al Michaels and Ara Parseghian
- Box Score

Game information

First quarter

- No scoring

Second quarter

- OSU – Vlade Janakievski 33-yard field goal, 12:14. Ohio State 3–0. Drive: 7 plays, 42 yards, 2:25
- MICH – Ali Haji-Sheikh 43-yard field goal, 6:26. Tie 3–3. Drive: 8 plays, 46 yards, 2:17.

Third quarter

- MICH – Anthony Carter 13-yard pass from John Wangler (kick failed), 5:00. Michigan 9–3. Drive: 14 plays, 56 yards, 6:50.

Fourth quarter'

- No scoring

Top passers

- MICH – John Wangler – 11/22, 120 yards, TD, 2 INT
- OSU – Art Schlichter – 8/26, 130 yards, INT

Top rushers

- MICH – Butch Woolfolk – 31 rushes, 141 yards
- OSU – Tim Spencer – 11 rushes, 55 yards

Top receivers

- MICH – Anthony Carter – 4 receptions, 47 yards, TD
- OSU – Gary Williams – 4 receptions, 50 yards

On November 22, Ohio State (AP No. 5) and Michigan (AP No. 10) met in their annual rivalry game to determine the Big Ten championship. The game was played before a record crowd of 88,827 fans at Ohio Stadium and matched the conference's top scoring offense (Ohio State) against the top scoring defense (Michigan). Michigan prevailed, defeating the Buckeyes by a 9–3 score. Michigan's only touchdown came late in the third quarter on a pass from John Wangler to Anthony Carter. Ali Haji-Sheikh missed the extra point and also missed two field goal attempts. Big Ten rushing leader Calvin Murray was held to 38 yards on 14 carries. Ohio State had a chance to win late in the fourth quarter, as Art Schlichter completed a 28-yard pass to the Michigan 32-yard line with less than a minute to play. Schlichter was penalized for intentional grounding and was sacked on the next play with 13 seconds left on the clock. Michigan extended its streak of not having allowed a touchdown to 18 quarters and 274 minutes.

=== Vs. Penn State (Fiesta Bowl) ===
1980 Fiesta Bowl

Team	1	2	3	4	Total
Ohio State	6	13	0	0	19
• Penn State	7	3	7	14	31

- Date: December 26
- Location: Sun Devil Stadium, Tempe, Arizona
- Game attendance: 66,738
- Television network: NBC

Scoring summary
1	PSU	Curt Warner 64-yard run (Herb Menhardt kick)	PSU 7-0
1	OSU	Doug Donley 23-yard pass from Art Schlichter (kick failed)	PSU 7-6
2	OSU	Gary Williams 13-yard pass from Art Schlichter (kick failed)	OSU 7-12
2	OSU	Doug Donley 19-yard pass from Art Schlichter (Bob Atha kick)	OSU 7-19
2	PSU	Herb Menhardt 38-field goal	OSU 10-19
3	PSU	Todd Blackledge 3-yard run (Herb Menhardt kick)	OSU 17-19
4	PSU	Jonathan Williams 4-yard run (Herb Menhardt kick)	PSU 24-19
4	PSU	Booker Moore 37-yard run (Herb Menhardt kick)	PSU 31-19

== Personnel ==
=== Coaching staff ===
- Earle Bruce – Head coach – 2nd year
- Dennis Fryzel – Defensive coordinator (2nd year)
- Glen Mason – Offensive coordinator (3rd year)
- Bill Myles – Offensive line (4th year)
- Nick Saban – Defensive backs (1st year)
- Wayne Stanley – Running backs (2nd year)
- Steve Szabo – Defensive line (2nd year)
- Bob Tucker – Defensive outside linebackers (2nd year)
- Fred Zechman – Quarterbacks/receivers (2nd year)

=== Roster ===
1980 Ohio State Buckeyes football team roster
Players
Coaches
Offense

Pos.	#	Name	Class
WR	22	Cedric Anderson	Fr
QB, K	1	Bob Atha	Jr
RB	38	Vaughn Broadnax	Fr
G	63	Scott Burns	Sr
C	50	Jim DeLeone	Sr
WR	47	Doug Donley	Sr
TE		Brad Dwelle
TE	89	John Frank	Fr
RB		Jim Gayle
OT	54	Luther Henson	Sr
WR	88	Thad Jemison	Fr
RB		Ricky Johnson
RB		Victor Langley
RB		Kelvin Lindsey
OT	72	Joe Lukens	So
RB	43	Calvin Murray	Sr
RB		Ray Myers
QB	10	Art Schlichter	Jr
G	67	Joe Smith	Sr
RB	46	Tim Spencer	So
QB	6	Tim Stephens	Fr
WR	44	Gary Williams	Sr
QB	17	Scott Woolf	Fr

Defense

Pos.	#	Name	Class
CB	25	Todd Bell	Sr
LB	35	Glen Cobb	So
CB	27	Ray Ellis	Sr
LB	33	John Epitropoulos	Sr
LB	65	Keith Ferguson	Sr
DL	55	Jerome Foster	Jr
DB		Rod Gorley
LB		Marcus Marek
DB	28	Bob Murphy	Sr
DL	93	Chris Riehm	So
DB		Vince Skillings
DL	97	Mark Sullivan	Jr
LB	15	Al Washington	Sr

Special teams

Pos.	#	Name	Class
K	13	Vlade Janakievski	Sr
P	19	Tom Orosz	Sr

Head coach

- Earle Bruce

Coordinators/assistant coaches

- Dennis Fryzel (DC)
- Nick Saban (DB)

Legend

- (C) Team captain
- (S) Suspended
- (I) Ineligible
- Injured
- Redshirt

Roster

=== Depth chart ===
Defense

FS
28 Bob Murphy
16 Rod Gorley

WLB	ILB	ILB	SLB
15 Al Washington	35 Glen Cobb	36 Marcus Marek	65 Keith Ferguson
96 Mike D'Andrea	59 John Epitropoulos	⋅	86 Ben Lee

ROV
25 Todd Bell
2 Shaun Gayle

CB
48 Vince Skillings
⋅

DE	NT	DE
55 Jerome Foster	97 Mark Sullivan	93 Chris Riehm
73 Reggie Echols	99 Nick Miller	90 Tony Megaro

CB
27 Ray Ellis
4 Norm Burrows

Offense

SE
44 Gary Williams
88 Thad Jemison

LT	LG	C	RG	RT
67 Joe Smith	63 Scott Burris	50 Jim DeLeone	72 Joe Lukens	54 Luther Henson
⋅	⋅	⋅	⋅	⋅

TE
81 Brad Dwelle
82 Ron Barwig

FL
47 Doug Donley
22 Cedric Anderson

QB
10 Art Schlichter
1 Bob Atha

FB
46 Tim Spencer
38 Vaughn Broadnax

Special teams
PK 13 Vlade Janakievski

P 19 Tom Orosz

LS 57 John Hutchings

RB
43 Calvin Murray
26 Jimmy Gayle
