= Schuh (surname) =

Schuh is a surname. Notable people with the name include:

- Anneliese Schuh-Proxauf (1922–2020), Austrian former alpine skier who competed in the 1948 Winter Olympics
- Audrey Schuh (born 1931), American operatic soprano
- Bérengère Schuh (born 1984), French athlete
- Christopher Schuh (born 1975), American metallurgist
- Dieter Schuh (born 1942), German Tibetologist, entrepreneur and politician
- Franz Schuh (disambiguation), several people
- Frederic Degraw Schuh (born 1934), American Plastic Surgeon
- Frederik Schuh (1875–1966), Dutch mathematician
- Gotthard Schuh (1897–1969), Swiss photographer and painter
- Harald Schuh (born 1974), Austrian politician
- Harry Schuh (1942–2013), American football player
- Jakob Schuh (born 1976), German animator
- Jeff Schuh (born 1958), American football player
- Julia Schuh: Julia Dannath-Schuh (born 1977), German psychologist
- Klement Schuh (1916–1995), Austrian weightlifter.
- Marc Schuh (born 1989), German wheelchair sprinter
- Melina Schuh, German molecular biologist.
- Oscar Fritz Schuh (1904–1984), German-Austrian opera director, theatre director and opera manager
- Richard Schuh (1920–1949), German convicted murderer
- Russell Schuh (1941–2016), American linguist
- Steve Schuh (born 1960), American county executive of Anne Arundel County, Maryland
- Willi Schuh (1900–1986), Swiss musicologist

== See also ==
- Shue, surname
