= 1980 Minnesota Golden Gophers football team =

American college football season

1980 Minnesota Golden Gophers football
- Conference: Big Ten Conference
- Record: 5–6 (4–5 Big Ten)
- Head coach: Joe Salem (2nd season)
- MVP: Marion Barber Jr.
- Captain: Marion Barber Jr.
- Home stadium: Memorial Stadium

1980 Big Ten Conference football standings
	Conf.					Overall
Team	W		L		T	W		L		T
No. 4 Michigan $	8	–	0	–	0	10	–	2	–	0
No. 15 Ohio State	7	–	1	–	0	9	–	3	–	0
No. 17 Purdue	7	–	1	–	0	9	–	3	–	0
Iowa	4	–	4	–	0	4	–	7	–	0
Minnesota	4	–	5	–	0	5	–	6	–	0
Indiana	3	–	5	–	0	6	–	5	–	0
Wisconsin	3	–	5	–	0	4	–	7	–	0
Illinois	3	–	5	–	0	3	–	7	–	1
Michigan State	2	–	6	–	0	3	–	8	–	0
Northwestern	0	–	9	–	0	0	–	11	–	0
$ – Conference champion; Rankings from AP Poll

The 1980 Minnesota Golden Gophers football team was an American football team that represented the University of Minnesota in the 1980 Big Ten Conference football season. In their second year under head coach Joe Salem, the Golden Gophers finished in fifth place in the Big Ten Conference (Big Ten), compiled a 5–6 record (4–5 against Big Ten opponents), and were outscored by their opponents by a combined total of 250 to 210.

The team's statistical leader included quarterback Tim Salem (son of head coach Joe Salem) with 887 passing yards, fullback Garry White with 959 rushing yards, Chester Cooper with 210 receiving yards, and tailback Marion Barber Jr. with 66 points scored. Several Minnesota players also ranked among the Big Ten leaders in various statistical categories, including the following:

- Marion Barber led the Big Ten with 11 rushing touchdowns and ranked seventh with 769 rushing yards.
- Garry White ranked second in the Big Ten with 5.4 yards per rushing attempt, third with nine rushing touchdowns and 1,136 yards from scrimmage, and fourth with 959 rushing yards.
- Tim Salem ranked fifth in the Big Ten with 13 interceptions, eighth with a 47.6 pass completion percentage and ninth with 887 passing yards and an 80.1 passer efficiency rating.

Marion Barber was the team captain and received the team's Most Valuable Player award. Barber, fullback Garry White, and defensive end Jeff Schuh were named All-Big Ten first team. Offensive guard Ken Dallafoir, free safety Mike Robb, linebacker Jeff Schuh, and defensive tackle Dana Noel were named All-Big Ten second team. Defensive lineman Brent Harms, defensive lineman Fred Orgas and free safety Mike Robb were named Academic All-Big Ten.

Total attendance for the season was 265,105, which averaged to 44,184. The season high for attendance was against rival Iowa.

== Schedule ==
Date	Opponent	Site	Result	Attendance	Source
September 13	Ohio*	Memorial Stadium; Minneapolis, MN	W 38–14	35,114	
September 20	at No. 2 Ohio State	Ohio Stadium; Columbus, OH	L 0–47	87,916	
September 27	No. 5 USC*	Memorial Stadium; Minneapolis, MN	L 7–24	55,115	
October 4	at Northwestern	Dyche Stadium; Evanston, IL	W 49–21	17,747	
October 11	at Purdue	Ross–Ade Stadium; West Lafayette, IN	L 7–21	69,399	
October 18	Michigan^{†}	Memorial Stadium; Minneapolis, MN (Little Brown Jug)	L 14–37	56,297	
October 25	Iowa	Memorial Stadium; Minneapolis, MN (rivalry)	W 24–6	58,158	
November 1	at Illinois	Memorial Stadium; Champaign, IL	W 21–18	51,202	
November 8	Indiana	Memorial Stadium; Minneapolis, MN	W 31–7	30,092	
November 15	Michigan State	Memorial Stadium; Minneapolis, MN	L 12–30	30,329	
November 22	at Wisconsin	Camp Randall Stadium; Madison, WI (rivalry)	L 7–25	54,229	
*Non-conference game; ^{†}Homecoming; Rankings from AP Poll released prior to the game

== Game summaries ==
=== Ohio ===
On September 13, Minnesota defeated the Ohio Bobcats, 38–14, at Memorial Stadium in Minneapolis. Freshman quarterback Tim Salem, the son of Minnesota head coach Joe Salem, passed for 162 yards in his college debut. Marion Barber, Jr. also rushed for 127 yards, and Garry White scored three touchdowns to lead the Golden Gophers.

=== At Ohio State ===
On September 20, in its first game against a Big Ten opponent, Minnesota lost to Ohio State (AP No. 2), 47–0, before the largest crowd (87,916) in Ohio Stadium history. Ohio State led, 33–0, at halftime in the one-sided contest. Minnesota running back Garry White fumbled twice, and quarterback Tim Salem threw three interceptions to help the Buckeyes' cause.

=== USC ===
On September 27, Minnesota lost to USC (AP No. 5), 24–7, in Minneapolis. The game drew a crowd of 55,115, the largest to attend a Minnesota football game in seven years. 1981 Heisman Trophy winner Marcus Allen rushed for 216 yards on 42 carries and scored two touchdowns for USC.

=== At Northwestern ===
On October 4, the week's only conference game matched Minnesota against Northwestern at Dyche Stadium (Evanston, Illinois). Minnesota won, 49–21, led by running backs Marion Barber, Jr. (118 rushing yards, three touchdowns) and Garry White (129 rushing yards, two touchdowns).

=== At Purdue ===
On October 11, Purdue defeated Minnesota, 21–7, in West Lafayette. In the first half, Purdue took a 21-0 lead, as Mark Herrmann completed 14 of 19 passes for 163 yards and two touchdowns. Purdue was shut out in the second half, and Herrmann had only 28 passing yards in the second half, but Purdue's 21 points in the first half were enough for the victory.

=== Michigan ===
Week 6: Michigan at Minnesota

Team	1	2	3	4	Total
• Michigan	7	16	7	7	37
Minnesota	0	7	0	7	14

- Date: October 18
- Location: Minneapolis
- Game attendance: 56,297

Scoring summary
1		MICH	Butch Woolfolk 27-yard run (Ali Haji-Sheikh)	MICH 7-0
2		MINN	Marion Barber 2-yard run (Galley kick)	TIE 7-7
2		MICH	Haji-Sheikh 45-yard field goal	MICH 10-7
2	3:27	MICH	Woolfolk 10-yard run (Haji-Sheikh kick)	MICH 17-7
2	0:25	MICH	Haji-Sheikh 29-yard field goal	MICH 20-7
2	0:02	MICH	Haji-Sheikh 19-yard field goal	MICH 23-7
3		MICH	Anthony Carter 23-yard pass from John Wangler (Haji-Sheikh kick)	MICH 30-7
4		MINN	Barber 1-yard run (Gallery kick)	MICH 30-14
4		MICH	Carter 5-yard pass from Wangler (Haji-Sheikh kick)	MICH 37-14

On October 18, Minnesota lost to Michigan, 37–14, on homecoming day at Memorial Stadium in Minneapolis. The crowd of 56,297 was the largest at Memorial Stadium since 1973. Minnesota crowded the line of scrimmage to stop Michigan's run game, opening up the passing game. Michigan quarterback John Wangler completed 16 of 22 passes for 227 yards.

In the first quarter, Michigan drove 80 yards on 11 plays, ending with a 27-yard touchdown run by Butch Woolfolk. The Golden Gophers tied the game early in the second quarter on a one-yard run by Marion Barber. Ali Haji-Sheikh put Michigan back in the lead with a 45-yard field goal.

With less than five minutes remaining in the first half, Wangler threw an interception at Minnesota's 15-yard line. Two plays later, Barber fumbled, and Michigan recovered at the five-yard line. Woolfolk followed with his second touchdown on a one-yard run.

After a defensive hold, Haji-Sheikh kicked his second field goal with 25 seconds remaining in the half. Minnesota fumbled again on its next play from scrimmage, and Michigan recovered at the eight-yard line. Haji-Sheikh kicked his third field goal of the quarter. Michigan scored 13 points in the last three-and-a-half minutes of the half, including two field goals in the last 30 seconds, to take a 23–7 lead at halftime. After the game, Minnesota coach Joe Salem said: "It was unbelievable. Everything in the world that you could imagine going wrong happened to us in those last few minutes of the second quarter. The roof caved in."

In the second half, Wangler threw two touchdown passes to Anthony Carter—a 27-yarder in the third quarter and a five-yarder in the fourth quarter. Carter, who faced man-to man-coverage for much of the game, caught nine passes for 142 yards in the game. After the game, coach Schembechler boasted that "Anthony Carter is the best receiver I've ever had. He's dynamite." Carter added, "my eyes kind of light up when I see man-to-man coverage."

Minnesota scored a fourth-quarter touchdown after Rich Hewlett turned the ball over on a fumble at Michigan's 20-yard line. Barber scored on a one-yard run.

=== Iowa ===
On October 25, in the annual battle for the Floyd of Rosedale trophy, Minnesota defeated Iowa, 24–6, before a crowd of 58,158 in Minneapolis. Iowa fumbled eight times, gave up eight sacks, and managed to score only two field goals. Marion Barber, Jr. scored three rushing touchdowns for Minnesota.

=== At Illinois ===
On November 1, Minnesota defeated Illinois, 21–18, before a homecoming crowd of 51,202 at Memorial Stadium in Champaign, Illinois. Illinois quarterback Dave Wilson completed 22 of 59 passes for 310 yards and two touchdowns. The game was marred by 12 fumbles and 22 penalties. Minnesota's running backs, Marion Barber, Jr. and Garry White rushed for 162 and 103 yards, respectively.

=== Indiana ===
On November 8, Minnesota defeated Indiana, 31–7, in Minneapolis. Indiana quarterback Tim Clifford was knocked out of the game in the first half by "a savage blindside tackle" by Jeff Schuh. Minnesota running back Garry White rushed for 145 yards and two touchdowns.

=== Michigan State ===
On November 15, Michigan State defeated Minnesota, 30–12, before a crowd of 30,329 in Minneapolis. Michigan State quarterback John Leister passed for 209 yards and three touchdowns. Minnesota quarterback Tim Salem completed only 5 of 15 passes, threw two interceptions, and fumbled twice.

=== At Wisconsin ===
Minnesota Golden Gophers (5–5) at Wisconsin Badgers (3–7)

Quarter	1	2	3	4	Total
Minnesota	7	0	0	0	7
Wisconsin	6	0	6	13	25

at Camp Randall Stadium, Madison, Wisconsin

- Date: November 22, 1980
- Game attendance: 54,229

On November 22, in the annual battle for Paul Bunyan' Axe, Wisconsin defeated Minnesota, 25–7, at Camp Randall Stadium in Madison. Wisconsin quarterback, Jess Cole, in his second start, scored four touchdowns. Tim Salem was injured when he was tackled throwing a pass in the second quarter and did not return.

Scoring summary

Quarter	Time	Drive			Team	Scoring information	Score	
Quarter	Time	Plays	Yards	TOP	Team	Scoring information	MINN	WISC
1			29		Wisconsin	Jess Cole 1-yard touchdown run, Mark Doran kick no good	0	6
1			80		Minnesota	Tim Salem 1-yard touchdown run, Jim Gallery kick good	7	6
3					Wisconsin	Jess Cole 52-yard touchdown run, 2-point pass failed	7	12
4					Wisconsin	Jess Cole 1-yard touchdown run, 2-point pass incomplete	7	18
4			39		Wisconsin	Jess Cole 1-yard touchdown run, Mark Doran kick good	7	25
"TOP" = time of possession. For other American football terms, see Glossary of American football.							7	25

== Roster ==
1980 Minnesota Golden Gophers football team roster
Players
Coaches
Offense

Pos.	#	Name	Class
G	68	Bob Anderson	Fr
WR	40	Roy Artis	Sr
RB	41	Marion Barber Jr.	Sr
C	57	Chris Bennett	So
TE	83	Jay Carroll	Fr
OT	78	Ken Dallafior	Jr
WR	85	Ken Hughes	Fr
G	65	Bill Humphries	So
WR	1	Kelvin Jenkins	Sr
OT	70	Pat Kelly	Fr
OT	79	Wally Kersten	Jr
QB	2	Jeff Kleinheinz	Fr
QB	7	Bruce Olson	So
C	58	Ed Olson	So
OT	69	Kent Penovich	Sr
C	53	Randy Rasmussen	So
QB	10	Tim Salem	Fr
TE	81	Randy Sonnenfeld	Sr

Defense

Pos.	#	Name	Class
DT	93	Steve Bisch	So
DT	68	Rene Capo	So
SS	14	Glenn Cardelli	So
LB	34	Glen Cieslewicz	Fr
SS	22	Paul Dagner	So
DE	98	Anthony Davis	So
CB	25	Howard Davis	So
DT	91	Jeff Denney	So
LB	89	Jim Fahnhorst	Jr
DT	38	Brent Harms	Jr
CB	42	Andre Harris	Fr
LB	95	Tony Horton	Fr
LB	3	Glenn Howard	Jr
LB	35	Mark Laliberte	So
DT	92	Dick Mass	So
DE	61	Todd Ness	Fr
CB	23	Dana Noel	Sr
CB	5	Gregg Olson	So
CB	13	Jim Olson	Fr
DT	75	Jim Olsonoski	Fr
DE	90	Fred Orgas	So
DE	77	Craig Paulson	Fr
DE	96	Jeff Schuh	Sr
DE	59	John Wood	So

Special teams

Pos.	#	Name	Class
P	11	Steve Edling	Fr
K	21	Jim Gallery	Fr

Head coach

- Joe Salem

Coordinators/assistant coaches

Legend

- (C) Team captain
- (S) Suspended
- (I) Ineligible
- Injured
- Redshirt

Roster
