= 1980 Wisconsin Badgers football team =

American college football season

1980 Wisconsin Badgers football
- Conference: Big Ten Conference
- Record: 4–7 (3–5 Big Ten)
- Head coach: Dave McClain (3rd season)
- Offensive coordinator: Bill Dudley (1st season)
- Offensive scheme: Triple option
- Defensive coordinator: Jim Hilles (3rd season)
- Base defense: 3–4
- MVP: Dave Ahrens
- Captains: Dave Ahrens; Joe Rothbauer
- Home stadium: Camp Randall Stadium

1980 Big Ten Conference football standings
	Conf.					Overall
Team	W		L		T	W		L		T
No. 4 Michigan $	8	–	0	–	0	10	–	2	–	0
No. 15 Ohio State	7	–	1	–	0	9	–	3	–	0
No. 17 Purdue	7	–	1	–	0	9	–	3	–	0
Iowa	4	–	4	–	0	4	–	7	–	0
Minnesota	4	–	5	–	0	5	–	6	–	0
Indiana	3	–	5	–	0	6	–	5	–	0
Wisconsin	3	–	5	–	0	4	–	7	–	0
Illinois	3	–	5	–	0	3	–	7	–	1
Michigan State	2	–	6	–	0	3	–	8	–	0
Northwestern	0	–	9	–	0	0	–	11	–	0
$ – Conference champion; Rankings from AP Poll

The 1980 Wisconsin Badgers football team was an American football team that represented the University of Wisconsin–Madison in the 1980 Big Ten Conference football season. In their third season under head coach Dave McClain, the Badgers finished in a tie for sixth place in the Big Ten Conference (Big Ten), compiled a 4–7 record (3–5 against Big Ten opponents), and were outscored by their opponents by a combined total of 211 to 138. The team played its home games in Camp Randall Stadium in Madison, Wisconsin.

The team's statistical leaders included John Josten with 622 passing yards, John Williams with 526 rushing yards, Tim Stracka with 462 receiving yards, and Jess Cole with 30 points. Tim Stracka also ranked sixth in the Big Ten with 16.5 yards per reception.

== Schedule ==
Date	Opponent	Site	Result	Attendance	Source
September 13	No. 20 Purdue	Camp Randall Stadium; Madison, WI	L 6–12	77,280	
September 20	BYU*	Camp Randall Stadium; Madison, WI	L 3–28	71,496	
September 27	at No. 16 UCLA*	Los Angeles Memorial Coliseum; Los Angeles, CA	L 0–35	40,018	
October 4	San Diego State*^{†}	Camp Randall Stadium; Madison, WI	W 35–12	76,340	
October 11	at Indiana	Memorial Stadium; Bloomington, IN	L 0–24	51,029	
October 18	at Michigan State	Spartan Stadium; East Lansing, MI	W 17–7	76,173	
October 25	No. 10 Ohio State	Camp Randall Stadium; Madison, WI	L 0–21	79,523	
November 1	at Iowa	Kinnick Stadium; Iowa City, IA (rivalry)	L 13–22	59,995	
November 8	No. 12 Michigan	Camp Randall Stadium; Madison, WI	L 0–24	69,560	
November 15	at Northwestern	Dyche Stadium; Evanston, IL	W 39–19	17,372	
November 22	Minnesota	Camp Randall Stadium; Madison, WI (rivalry)	W 25–7	54,229	
*Non-conference game; ^{†}Homecoming; Rankings from AP Poll released prior to the game

== Game summaries ==
=== Purdue ===
On September 13, Wisconsin opened its season with a 12–6 loss to #20 Purdue. Mark Herrmann of Purdue passed for 347 yards, including 200 yards to wide receiver Bart Burrell, but the Boilermakers were unable to score a touchdown, settling for four field goals.

=== BYU ===
On September 20, Wisconsin lost to BYU, 28–3, in Madison. BYU's Jim McMahon, winner of the 1981 Davey O'Brien Award and Sammy Baugh Trophy, passed for 337 yards and three touchdowns and ran for a fourth touchdown.

=== At UCLA ===
On September 27, Wisconsin lost to UCLA (AP No. 16), 35–7, at the Rose Bowl in Pasadena. UCLA's freshman running back Kevin Nelson rushed for 123 yards and a touchdown on 20 carries and also caught three passes for 36 yards. John Williams rushed for 101 yards for Wisconsin, but the Badgers were unable to score.

=== San Diego State ===
On October 4, Wisconsin defeated San Diego State, 35–12, in Madison. After failing to score a touchdown in its first three games, Wisconsin took a 21–0 lead over San Diego State in the second quarter. Defensive end Dave Ahrens had three sacks, and the Aztecs were held to minus four net rushing yards.

=== At Indiana ===
On October 11, Indiana defeated Wisconsin, 24–0, in front of a homecoming crowd of 51,029 at Memorial Stadium in Bloomington. Indiana's defense held Wisconsin to 204 yards of total offense (only 65 in the second half) and had seven tackles for loss. Quarterback Tim Clifford completed 17 of 25 passes for 186 yards and two touchdowns.

=== At Michigan State ===
On October 18, Wisconsin defeated Michigan State, 17–7, at Spartan Stadium in East Lansing. Wisconsin fullback Dave Mohapp rushed for 138 yards and scored a touchdown. Wisconsin's second touchdown followed a fumbled punt that was recovered in the end zone by Mark Subach.

=== Ohio State ===
On October 25, Wisconsin lost to #10 Ohio State, 21–0, in Madison. Wisconsin's defense held Art Schlichter to 89 passing yards, but Ohio State scored touchdowns after two Wisconsin fumbles and an interception. After the game, Wisconsin coach Dave McClain said, "You can't make that many mistakes. I've never been so frustrated with the mistakes."

=== At Iowa ===
On November 1, Wisconsin lost to Iowa, 22–13, in Iowa City. In his first game as Iowa's starting quarterback, Pete Gales completed nine of 22 passes for 161 yards and rushed for 41 yards. One of Gales' completions was good for 54 yards and a touchdown to Keith Chappelle. Iowa scored another touchdown when Iowa linebacker Andre Tippett forced a fumble by Wisconsin quarterback John Josten, and Mark Bortz recovered the ball in the end zone.

=== Michigan ===
On November 8, Wisconsin lost to #8 Michigan, 24–0, in Madison. Michigan struggled early, failing to earn a first down on its first six possessions. Anthony Carter caught a touchdown pass just before halftime to set a Michigan school record for touchdown receptions in a single season. As Michigan drove deep into Wisconsin territory, noise from the Wisconsin student section made it difficult for Michigan to call its signals. When fans refused to reduce the noise, the officials struck all three Wisconsin timeouts and then assessed two delay of game penalties, giving Michigan a first down at the one-yard line. Butch Woolfolk then scored on a one-yard run

=== At Northwestern ===
On November 15, Wisconsin defeated Northwestern, 39–19, in Evanston. Northwestern's Mike Kerrigan passed for 237 yards in the loss. The Wildcats finished the season 0–11 and in the midst of a 34-game losing streak that began on September 22, 1979, and ended on September 25, 1982

=== Minnesota ===
Minnesota Golden Gophers (5–5) at Wisconsin Badgers (3–7)

Quarter	1	2	3	4	Total
Minnesota	7	0	0	0	7
Wisconsin	6	0	6	13	25

at Camp Randall Stadium, Madison, Wisconsin

- Date: November 22, 1980
- Game attendance: 54,229

On November 22, in the annual battle for Paul Bunyan' Axe, Wisconsin defeated Minnesota, 25–7, at Camp Randall Stadium in Madison. Wisconsin quarterback, Jess Cole, in his second start, scored four touchdowns. Cole started in place of John Josten, who had re-injured an ankle the previous week versus Northwestern.

Scoring summary

Quarter	Time	Drive			Team	Scoring information	Score	
Quarter	Time	Plays	Yards	TOP	Team	Scoring information	MINN	WISC
1			29		Wisconsin	Jess Cole 1-yard touchdown run, Mark Doran kick no good	0	6
1			80		Minnesota	Tim Salem 1-yard touchdown run, Jim Gallery kick good	7	6
3					Wisconsin	Jess Cole 52-yard touchdown run, 2-point pass failed	7	12
4					Wisconsin	Jess Cole 1-yard touchdown run, 2-point pass incomplete	7	18
4			39		Wisconsin	Jess Cole 1-yard touchdown run, Mark Doran kick good	7	25
"TOP" = time of possession. For other American football terms, see Glossary of American football.							7	25

== Roster ==
1980 Wisconsin Badgers football team roster
Players
Coaches
Offense

Pos.	#	Name	Class
QB	10	Jess Cole	Fr
RB	23	Chucky Davis (I)	So
G	57	John Dixon	Sr
OT	70	Jerry Doerger	Jr
TE	93	Mike Fixmer	Sr
TE	37	Craig Fredrick	Jr
FB	36	Gerald Green	So
QB	8	Paul Hughes	Jr
QB	13	John Josten	Jr
G	71	Leo Joyce	Sr
RB	35	Troy King	So
RB	20	Thad McFadden	Fr
FB	28	Dave Mohapp	Jr
QB	16	Kevin Motl	Sr
WR	22	Marvin Neal	So
OT	68	Mark Orszula	Sr
TE	84	Greg Rabas	Jr
OT	63	Tom Reber	Sr
RB	33	Curtis Richardson	Jr
C	59	Joe Rothbauer (C)	Sr
TE	81	Joe Ruetz	Sr
WR	34	Al Seamonson	Jr
WR	42	Tim Stracka	Jr
G	53	Mark Subach	So
G	73	Melvin Terrell	Fr
OT	58	Ron Versnik	Jr
OT	74	Carlton Walker	Fr
C	51	Ted Walter	Sr
RB	1	John Williams	So
G	79	Bob Winckler	So

Defense

Pos.	#	Name	Class
LB	41	Dave Ahrens (C)	Sr
CB	29	Ross Anderson	Sr
DT	92	Scott Bergold	Fr
DT	85	Curt Blaskowski	Sr
LB	95	Guy Boliaux	Jr
DT	77	Tom Booker	So
LB	32	Kyle Borland	So
CB	25	Pat Delaney	Sr
S, P	31	David Greenwood	So
DT	72	Mike Herrington	So
DT	90	Thomas Houston	Sr
NT	50	Tim Krumrie	So
LB	47	Dave Levenick	Sr
LB	46	Richard Lewis	Sr
LB	94	Jeff Luko	Jr
CB	45	Von Mansfield	Jr
S	11	Dan Messenger	Jr
S	43	Sankar Montoute	So
LB	44	Jody O'Donnell	So
CB	5	Marshall Richards	Sr
DT	56	Dean Seis	Sr
LB	99	Ed Senn	So
DT	76	Mark Shumate	Jr
CB	9	Clint Sims	So
DT	60	Darryl Sims	Fr
LB	49	Larry Spurlin	Jr
CB	2	Ron Steverson	Jr
S	27	Vaughn Thomas	Jr
CB	5	Jerry Vance	Fr
S	39	Matt Vanden Boom	Jr
S	7	John Westphal	Jr

Special teams

Pos.	#	Name	Class
S, P	31	David Greenwood	So
K	24	Mark Doran	Fr
K	6	Wendell Gladem	Fr
K	3	Pat Hady	So

Head coach

- Dave McClain

Coordinators/assistant coaches

- Bill Dudley – Offensive Coordinator/Quarterbacks and Receivers
- Jim Hilles – Defensive Coordinator/Linebackers
- Doug Graber – Defensive Backs
- Arnold Jeter – Defensive Line
- Cliff Knox – Running Backs
- Mike Nelson – Defensive Ends
- Bob Palcic – Tackles and Tight Ends
- Mario Russo – Centers and Guards
- Terry Murawski – Administrative Assistant
- Jerry Fishbain – Recruiting Coordinator

Legend

- (C) Team captain
- (S) Suspended
- (I) Ineligible
- Injured
- Redshirt

== 1981 NFL draft ==
Player	Position	Round	Pick	NFL club
Dave Ahrens	Linebacker	6	143	St. Louis Cardinals
