= 1980 Indiana Hoosiers football team =

American college football season

1980 Indiana Hoosiers football
- Conference: Big Ten Conference
- Record: 6–5 (3–5 Big Ten)
- Head coach: Lee Corso (8th season)
- MVP: Tim Clifford
- Captains: Tim Clifford; Terry Tallen; Lucky Wallace; Craig Walls
- Home stadium: Memorial Stadium

1980 Big Ten Conference football standings
	Conf.					Overall
Team	W		L		T	W		L		T
No. 4 Michigan $	8	–	0	–	0	10	–	2	–	0
No. 15 Ohio State	7	–	1	–	0	9	–	3	–	0
No. 17 Purdue	7	–	1	–	0	9	–	3	–	0
Iowa	4	–	4	–	0	4	–	7	–	0
Minnesota	4	–	5	–	0	5	–	6	–	0
Indiana	3	–	5	–	0	6	–	5	–	0
Wisconsin	3	–	5	–	0	4	–	7	–	0
Illinois	3	–	5	–	0	3	–	7	–	1
Michigan State	2	–	6	–	0	3	–	8	–	0
Northwestern	0	–	9	–	0	0	–	11	–	0
$ – Conference champion; Rankings from AP Poll

The 1980 Indiana Hoosiers football team was an American football team that represented Indiana University Bloomington in the 1980 Big Ten Conference football season. In their eighth season under head coach Lee Corso, the Hoosiers finished in a tie for sixth place in the Big Ten Conference (Big Ten), compiled a 6–5 (3–5 against Big Ten opponents), and outscored their opponents by a combined total of 255 to 235. The team played its home games at Memorial Stadium in Bloomington, Indiana.

The team's statistical leaders included quarterback Tim Clifford with 1,391 passing yards, Lonnie Johnson with 1,075 receiving yards and 66 points scored, and Nate Lundy with 459 receiving yards. Several Indiana players also ranked among the Big Ten leaders in various statistical categories, including the following:

- Lonnie Johnson led the Big Ten with 11 rushing touchdowns and 200 rushing attempts, ranked second with 1,075 rushing yards and 1,146 yards from scrimmage, and ranked third with 5.4 yards per rushing attempt.
- Tim Wilbur led the Big Ten with 9.1 yard per punt return and 256 punt return yards.
- Tim Clifford ranked fourth in the Big Ten with a 53.0 pass completion percentage, 16 total touchdowns, and 7.0 yards per passing attempt, and ranked seventh with 1,391 passing yards.

== Schedule ==
Date	Opponent	Site	Result	Attendance	Source
September 13	Iowa	Memorial Stadium; Bloomington, IN	L 7–16	50,173	
September 20	at Kentucky*	Commonwealth Stadium; Lexington, KY (rivalry)	W 36–30	57,869	
September 27	at Colorado*	Folsom Field; Boulder, CO	W 49–7	40,219	
October 4	Duke*	Memorial Stadium; Bloomington, IN	W 31–21	43,120	
October 11	Wisconsin^{†}	Memorial Stadium; Bloomington, IN	W 24–0	51,029	
October 18	at No. 9 Ohio State	Ohio Stadium; Columbus, OH	L 17–27	87,957	
October 25	at Northwestern	Dyche Stadium; Evanston, IL	W 35–20	19,535	
November 1	No. 18 Michigan	Memorial Stadium; Bloomington, IN	L 0–35	52,071	
November 8	at Minnesota	Memorial Stadium; Minneapolis, MN	L 7–31	30,092	
November 15	Illinois	Memorial Stadium; Bloomington, IN (rivalry)	W 26–24	38,128	
November 22	at Purdue	Ross–Ade Stadium; West Lafayette, IN (Old Oaken Bucket)	L 23–24	71,629	
*Non-conference game; ^{†}Homecoming; Rankings from AP Poll released prior to the game

== Game summaries ==
=== Iowa ===
On September 13, Indiana opened its season with a 16–7 loss to Iowa. Jeff Brown rushed for 176 yards and caught five passes in his first start as Iowa's tailback.

=== At Kentucky ===
On September 20, the Hoosiers played the annual Bourbon Barrel rivalry game. Indiana defeated Kentucky, 36–30, at Lexington, Kentucky. The game was tied at 30–30 when Indiana intercepted a Kentucky pass at midfield with 1:01 remaining in the game. Indiana took the lead on a touchdown pass to Steve Corso (the son of Indiana head coach Lee Corso); Corso called the play the "old pine tree slant".

=== At Colorado ===
On September 27, Indiana defeated Colorado, 49–7, before a crowd of 40,219 at Folsom Field in Boulder, Colorado. Flanker Nate Lundy shattered Indiana's single game receiving record (previously 178 yards) with five catches for 256 yards and three touchdowns. After the game, coach Lee Corso said: "Nate Lundy had a great game. 'Doctor Deep' can run on anyone." Quarterback Tim Clifford also tied the school's single game passing yardage record (set in 1943 by Robert Hoernschemeyer), completing 11 of 14 passes for 345 yards and five touchdowns. Clifford also broke the school's career record with 262 completions. Mike Harkrader also became the school's career rushing leader with 2,791 yards.

=== Duke ===
On October 4, Indiana defeated Duke, 31–21, before a crowd of 43,120 at Memorial Stadium in Bloomington. Running back Lonnie Johnson tied Indiana's single game rushing record (set by Courtney Snyder in 1974) with 211 rushing yards against Duke. After the game, coach Lee Corso called Johnson "the best all-around back in the Big Ten."

=== Wisconsin ===
Indiana defeated Wisconsin, 24–0, in front of a homecoming crowd of 51,029 at Memorial Stadium in Bloomington. Indiana's defense held Wisconsin to 204 yards of total offense (only 65 in the second half) and had seven tackles for loss. Quarterback Tim Clifford completed 17 of 25 passes for 186 yards and two touchdowns.

=== At Ohio State ===
On October 18, Indiana lost to #9 Ohio State, 27–17, at Ohio Stadium in Columbus. Ohio State running back Calvin Murray rushed for 224 yards, the fourth highest single-game tally in Ohio State history to that time, on 35 carries and scored two touchdowns on his 22nd birthday. Indiana running back Mike Harkrader rushed for 117 yards on 18 carries. Harkrader became the seventh leading rusher in Big Ten history with 3,034 yards.

=== At Northwestern ===
On October 25, Indiana defeated Northwestern, 35–20, in Evanston. Lonnie Johnson rushed for 160 yards on 22 carries, and Mike Harkrader added 102 rushing yards.

=== Michigan ===
On November 1, #18 Michigan defeated Indiana, 35–0, at Memorial Stadium in Bloomington. Michigan totaled 349 rushing yards, including 152 by Butch Woolfolk and 123 by Lawrence Ricks. Ricks scored two touchdowns in a span of 28 seconds, running 29 yards for the first, then scoring again after Indiana fumbled the ensuing kickoff. Anthony Carter caught a 34-yard touchdown pass from Wangler, and Woolfolk added a 64-yard touchdown run in the fourth quarter. Michigan also intercepted four of Tim Clifford's passes.

=== At Minnesota ===
On November 8, Minnesota defeated Indiana, 31–7, in Minneapolis. Quarterback Tim Clifford was knocked out of the game in the first half by "a savage blindside tackle" by Jeff Schuh. Minnesota running back Garry White rushed for 145 yards and two touchdowns.

=== Illinois ===
On November 15, Indiana defeated Illinois, 26–24, in Bloomington. Indiana tailback Lonnie Johnson rushed for a school record 237 yards on 37 carries. Illinois quarterback Dave Wilson kept the game close as he passed for 403 yards and three touchdowns.

=== At Purdue ===
Indiana Hoosiers (6–4) at Purdue Boilermakers (7–3)

Quarter	1	2	3	4	Total
Indiana	3	7	0	13	23
Purdue	0	3	14	7	24

at Ross–Ade Stadium, West Lafayette, Indiana

- Date: November 22, 1980
- Game attendance: 71,629

Game information

First quarter

- IND – Kevin Kellogg 20-yard field goal. Indiana 3–0.

Second quarter

- IND – Lonnie Johnson 5-yard run (Kevin Kellogg kick), 6:16. Indiana 10–0. Drive: 84 yards.
- PUR – Rick Anderson 19-yard field goal. Indiana 10–3.

Third quarter

- PUR – Ben McCall 1-yard run (Rick Anderson kick). Tie 10–10.
- PUR – Bart Burrell 20-yard pass from Mark Herrmann (Rick Anderson kick). Purdue 17–10.

Fourth quarter

- IND – Lonnie Johnson 1-yard run (Kevin Kellogg kick). Tie 17–17.
- PUR – Ben McCall 4-yard run (Rick Anderson kick), 8:56. Purdue 24–17.
- IND – Steve Corso 10-yard pass from Tim Clifford (pass failed), 0:17. Purdue 24–23.

Top passers

- PUR – Mark Herrmann – 19/23, 323 yards, TD

Top rushers

- IND – Lonnie Johnson – 220 yards, 2 TD

External videos
- 1980 Indiana at Purdue game film – Part 1 (no sound)
- 1980 Indiana at Purdue game film - Part 2 (no sound)

On November 22, in the annual battle for the Old Oaken Bucket, Purdue defeated Indiana, 24–23, in West Lafayette. Purdue led, 24–17, with 21 seconds left when Tim Clifford threw a touchdown pass to Steve Corso (Indiana coach Lee Corso's son). Rather than kick an extra point to tie the game, Indiana coach Corso called for a pass play to win the game; the pass was knocked down, and Purdue preserved a one-point margin of victory.

== Roster ==
1980 Indiana Hoosiers football team roster
Players
Coaches
Offense

Pos.	#	Name	Class
OT	73	Gerhard Ahting	Sr
FB	29	Jerry Bowers	Sr
WR	2	John Boyd	So
WR	80	Greg Brooks	Jr
RB	22	Kevin Burke	Jr
QB	14	Tim Clifford	Sr
WR	7	Steve Corso	Sr
RB	40	Al Darring	Sr
OT	72	Chuck Gannon	So
G	65	Jeff Goldin	Sr
TE	81	Dave Harangody	Sr
RB	24	Mike Harkrader	Sr
RB	20	Rob Harkrader	So
QB	10	Chad Huck	Sr
RB	44	Lonnie Johnson	Sr
WR	89	Nate Lundy	Sr
TE	84	Scot McNabb	Jr
OT	71	Gerald Michko	Sr
FB	33	John Mineo	So
WR	42	John Roggeman	So
G	59	Kevin Speer	Sr
TE	84	Bob Stephenson	Jr
TE	88	Doug Swafford	Fr
RB	35	Bob Taylor	So
G	61	John Taylor	Sr
C	70	Lucky Wallace	Sr
RB	34	Jack Walsh	Fr

Defense

Pos.	#	Name	Class
SS	46	Chuck Alexander	Sr
DT	92	Ken Bell	Jr
DT	93	Greg Brown	Jr
DE	85	Lou Cristofoli	Fr
DE	95	Eric DeBord	Sr
DE	56	Dennis Edwards	Fr
LB	17	Marlin Evans	Jr
LB	36	Jim Flake	Jr
DE	38	Jimmy Hunter	So
LB	27	Mike Kazanowski	So
LB	39	Kevin Kenley	Jr
DT	67	Mark Kaiser	Jr
DE	31	Craig Kumerow	Jr
SS	47	Jerry Lee	Jr
CB	49	Marc Longshore	Jr
FS	1	Steve Mitchell	Jr
CB	19	Mike Pendleton	So
SS	21	Dart Ramsey	Jr
DE	83	Steve Rohe	So
DL	68	Denver Smith	Jr
DT	82	Mark Smythe	So
LB	62	Terry Tallen	Sr
DE	97	Brent Tisdale	Sr
DT	76	Rod Walden	Jr
LB	60	Craig Walls	Jr
LB	37	Mark Weiler	Fr
CB	11	Dave Weir	Jr
CB	8	Tim Wilbur	Jr

Special teams

Pos.	#	Name	Class
P	9	Don Geisler	Fr
K	3	Kevin Kellogg	Sr

Head coach

- Lee Corso

Coordinators/assistant coaches

Legend

- (C) Team captain
- (S) Suspended
- (I) Ineligible
- Injured
- Redshirt

== 1981 NFL draftees ==
Player	Position	Round	Pick	NFL club
Tim Clifford	Quarterback	10	260	Chicago Bears
Lonnie Johnson	Running back	11	287	Chicago Bears
Nate Lundy	Wide receiver	12	329	Dallas Cowboys
