= 1980 Purdue Boilermakers football team =

American college football season

1980 Purdue Boilermakers football

Liberty Bowl champion

Liberty Bowl, W 28–25 vs. Missouri
- Conference: Big Ten Conference

Ranking
- Coaches: No. 16
- AP: No. 17
- Record: 9–3 (7–1 Big Ten)
- Head coach: Jim Young (4th season)
- Offensive coordinator: Doug Redmann (1st season)
- Defensive coordinator: Leon Burtnett (4th season)
- MVP: Mark Herrmann
- Captains: Tom Kingsbury; Pete Quinn
- Home stadium: Ross–Ade Stadium

1980 Big Ten Conference football standings
	Conf.					Overall
Team	W		L		T	W		L		T
No. 4 Michigan $	8	–	0	–	0	10	–	2	–	0
No. 15 Ohio State	7	–	1	–	0	9	–	3	–	0
No. 17 Purdue	7	–	1	–	0	9	–	3	–	0
Iowa	4	–	4	–	0	4	–	7	–	0
Minnesota	4	–	5	–	0	5	–	6	–	0
Indiana	3	–	5	–	0	6	–	5	–	0
Wisconsin	3	–	5	–	0	4	–	7	–	0
Illinois	3	–	5	–	0	3	–	7	–	1
Michigan State	2	–	6	–	0	3	–	8	–	0
Northwestern	0	–	9	–	0	0	–	11	–	0
$ – Conference champion; Rankings from AP Poll

The 1980 Purdue Boilermakers football team was an American football team that represented Purdue University during the 1980 Big Ten Conference football season. In their fourth season under head coach Jim Young, the Boilermakers finished in a tie for second place in the Big Ten Conference, compiled a 9–3 record (7–1 against Big Ten opponents), defeated Missouri in the Liberty Bowl, were ranked No. 16 in the final AP Poll, and outscored all opponents by a combined total of 328 to 233. The team played its home games at Ross–Ade Stadium in West Lafayette, Indiana.

Quarterback Mark Herrmann gained national attention for breaking the NCAA's career record for passing yardage. He finished his collegiate career having completed 772 of 1,309 passes for 9,946 yards, 71 touchdowns, and 75 interceptions. Herrmann and teammate Dave Young, a tight end, were the only two Big Ten players to be recognized as consensus first-team players on the 1980 College Football All-America Team. Herrmann also won the Chicago Tribune Silver Football as the most valuable player in the Big Ten Conference.

Several Purdue players ranked among the Big Ten leaders in various statistical categories, including the following:

- Mark Herrmann led the Big Ten Conference with 3,212 passing yards, a 65.8 pass completion percentage, 23 passing touchdowns, 8.7 yards per passing attempt, a 150.5 pass efficiency rating, and 3,026 passing yards.
- Dave Young led the Big Ten with 70 receptions and ranked second in the Big Ten with nine receiving touchdowns and third with 959 receiving yards.
- Rick Anderson led the Big Ten with 16 field goals made and a 69.6 field goal percentage and ranked second with 86 points scored.
- Jimmy Smith ranked sixth in the Big Ten with 269 kickoff return yards, seventh with seven rushing touchdowns, eighth with 54 points scored, ninth with 19.2 yards per kickoff return, and 10th with 657 rushing yards, 139 rushing attempts, and 160 plays from scrimmage.
- Bart Burrell ranked second in the Big Ten with 66 receptions and 1,001 receiving yards
- Steve Bryant ranked fifth in the Big Ten with 50 receptions, fourth in the Big Ten with 892 receiving yards, and third in the Big Ten with 17.8 yards per reception.
- Robert Williams tied for the Big Ten lead with five interceptions.
- Bill Kay led the Big Ten with 104 interception return yards.
- Scott Craig ranked fifth in the Big Ten with 122 punt return yards and seventh with 4.5 yards per punt return.
- Jim Bosché was ranked ninth in the Big Ten with 35.7 yards per punt, but ranked second in the Big Ten with 34.7 yards net punt average after the return.

== Schedule ==
Date	Opponent	Rank	Site	TV	Result	Attendance	Source
September 6	at No. 11 Notre Dame*	No. 9	Notre Dame Stadium; Notre Dame, IN (rivalry)	ABC	L 10–31	59,075	
September 13	at Wisconsin	No. 20	Camp Randall Stadium; Madison, WI		W 12–6	77,280	
September 20	No. 16 UCLA*		Ross–Ade Stadium; West Lafayette, IN		L 14–23	69,333	
October 4	Miami (OH)*		Ross–Ade Stadium; West Lafayette, IN		W 28–3	69,889	
October 11	Minnesota^{†}		Ross–Ade Stadium; West Lafayette, IN		W 21–7	69,399	
October 18	at Illinois		Memorial Stadium; Champaign, IL (rivalry)		W 45–20	62,121	
October 25	Michigan State		Ross–Ade Stadium; West Lafayette, IN		W 36–25	69,231	
November 1	at Northwestern	No. 20	Dyche Stadium; Evanston, IL		W 52–31	17,744	
November 8	Iowa	No. 17	Ross–Ade Stadium; West Lafayette, IN		W 58–13	68,775	
November 15	at No. 11 Michigan	No. 16	Michigan Stadium; Ann Arbor, MI	ABC	L 0–26	105,831	
November 22	Indiana		Ross–Ade Stadium; West Lafayette, IN (Old Oaken Bucket)		W 24–23	71,629	
December 27	vs. Missouri*		Liberty Bowl Memorial Stadium; Memphis, TN (Liberty Bowl)	ABC	W 28–25	53,667	
*Non-conference game; ^{†}Homecoming; Rankings from AP Poll released prior to the game

== Game summaries ==
=== At Notre Dame ===
#9 Purdue Boilermakers (0–0) at #11 Notre Dame Fighting Irish (0–0)

Quarter	1	2	3	4	Total
Purdue	0	10	0	0	10
Notre Dame	10	7	7	7	31

at Notre Dame Stadium, South Bend, Indiana

- Date: September 6
- Game attendance: 59,075
- TV: ABC
- Recap/Box

Game information

First quarter

- ND – Harry Oliver 36-yard field goal, 7:19. Notre Dame 3–0. Drive: 5 plays, 28 yards, 2:50.
- ND – Rob McGarry 2-yard run (Harry Oliver kick), 0:42. Notre Dame 10–0. Drive: 9 plays, 57 yards, 4:48.

Second quarter

- ND – Phil Carter 1-yard run (Harry Oliver kick), 11:40. Notre Dame 17–0. Drive: 7 plays, 46 yards, 3:16.
- PUR – Rick Anderson 26-yard field goal, 4:19. Notre Dame 17–3. Drive: 14 plays, 74 yards, 7:21.
- PUR – Wally Jones 4-yard run (Rick Anderson kick), 0:34. Notre Dame 17–10. Drive: 8 plays, 68 yards, 3:04.

Third quarter

- ND – Tony Hunter 9-yard pass from Mike Courey (Harry Oliver kick), 11:36. Notre Dame 24–10. Drive: 7 plays, 76 yards, 3:24.

Fourth quarter

- ND – Mike Courey 14-yard run (Harry Oliver kick), 4:01. Notre Dame 31–10. Drive: 9 plays, 62 yards, 4:50.

Top passers

- PUR – Scott Campbell – 17/26, 178 yards
- ND – Mike Courey – 10/13, 151 yards, TD, INT

Top rushers

- PUR – John Macon – 9 rushes, 32 yards
- ND – Phil Carter – 29 rushes, 142 yards, TD

Top receivers

- PUR – Dave Young – 6 receptions, 71 yards
- ND – Tony Hunter – 3 receptions, 75 yards, TD

In non-conference play, Purdue (AP No. 9) opened its season with a 31–10 loss to Notre Dame (AP No. 11) at Notre Dame Stadium. Purdue quarterback Mark Herrmann was sidelined with a bruised thumb (injured in practice during the week) and did not play. Phil Carter rushed for 142 yards for Notre Dame. After the game, the Boilermakers fell from No. 9 to No. 11 in the AP Poll.

=== Wisconsin ===
#20 Purdue at Wisconsin

Team	1	2	3	4	Total
• Purdue	3	3	6	0	12
Wisconsin	3	3	0	0	6

- Date: Saturday, September 13
- Location: Camp Randall Stadium, Madison, Wisconsin
- Game attendance: 77,280
- Source: Palm Beach Post

Scoring summary
1	PUR	Anderson 30-yard field goal	PUR 3-0
1	WIS	Gladem 34-yard field goal	Tied 3-3
2	WIS	Gladem 34-yard field goal	WIS 6-3
2	PUR	Anderson 48-yard field goal	Tied 6-6
3	PUR	Anderson 19-yard field goal	PUR 9-6
3	PUR	Anderson 40-yard field goal	PUR 12-6

Purdue (AP No. 20) defeated Wisconsin, 12–6. Mark Herrmann passed for 347 yards (27–43), including 200 yards to wide receiver Bart Burrell, but the Boilermakers were unable to score a touchdown, settling for three field goals. After the game, Purdue dropped out of the top 25.

=== UCLA ===
Purdue lost to UCLA, 23–14, in West Lafayette. Mark Herrmann passed for 282 yards, and his two touchdown passes gave him the Big Ten career record with 50 touchdown passes. Herrmannalso threw two interceptions in the defeat. The loss broke a 12-game winning streak for Purdue at Ross–Ade Stadium.

=== Miami (OH) ===
Purdue defeated Miami (OH), 28–3, as Mark Herrmann passed for 291 yards and three touchdowns.

=== Minnesota ===
Team	1	2	3	4	Total
Minnesota	0	0	0	7	7
• Purdue	6	15	0	0	21

- Date: October 11
- Location: Ross–Ade Stadium

Scoring summary
Q1	PUR	Jones 3 yard run (kick failed)	PUR 6–0
Q2	PUR	Young 5 yard pass from Herrmann (Bryant pass from Herrmann)	PUR 14–0
Q2	PUR	Young 7 yard pass from Herrmann (Anderson kick)	PUR 21–0
Q4	MINN	Barber 1 yard run (Gallery kick)	PUR 21–7

Purdue defeated Minnesota, 21–7, in West Lafayette. In the first half, Purdue took a 21–0 lead, as Mark Herrmann completed 14 of 19 passes for 163 yards and two touchdowns. Purdue was shut out in the second half, and Herrmann had only 28 passing yards in the second half, but Purdue's 21 points in the first half were enough for the victory.

=== Illinois ===
Purdue defeated Illinois, 45–20, before a crowd of 62,121 at Memorial Stadium in Champaign. In a remarkable passing exhibition, the Big Ten single-game record for passing yardage was broken twice in the same game. Mark Herrmann broke the record first with 371 yards on 24-of-35 passing, surpassing the mark set two years earlier by Eddie Smith. Bart Burrell caught 10 passes for 186 yards. Herrmannwent to the bench halfway through the fourth quarter, only to watch his record broken by Illinois quarterback Dave Wilson who tallied 425 passing yards as the Illini passed with abandon through the final minutes. Wilson also broke Big Ten single-game records with 58 passes and 35 completions.

=== Michigan State ===
Purdue defeated Michigan State, 36–25, in West Lafayette. Mark Herrmann completed 24 of 46 passes for 340 yards to break the NCAA career record for passing yardage. Herrmann passed the prior record of 7,747 yards set by Jack Thompson from 1976 to 1978. Dave Young caught 12 passes for 172 yards. Michigan State quarterback John Leister threw more passes (54) than Herrmann, but completed only 18, had five interceptions, and lost a fumble. After the game, Michigan State coach Muddy Waters said, "John is pretty disgusted with himself."

=== Northwestern ===
Purdue (AP No. 20) defeated Northwestern, 52–31, before a crowd of 17,744 persons at Dyche Stadium in Evanston. Purdue's 52 points was its highest scoring output in a game since 1947. Purdue running back rushed for 190 yards and scored four touchdown. Mark Herrmann passed for 210 yards and three touchdowns. Herrmann also set the all-time record for career pass completions (651) and interceptions (69).

- Jimmy Smith 29 rushes, 190 yards

=== Iowa ===
Team	1	2	3	4	Total
Iowa	7	0	0	6	13
• Purdue	10	13	28	7	58

- Date: November 8
- Location: Ross–Ade Stadium, West Lafayette, Indiana

Scoring summary
1	PUR	Smith 9-yard pass from Herrmann (Anderson kick)	PUR 7-0
1	IOWA	Gales 4-yard run (Olejniczak kick)	Tied 7-7
1	PUR	Anderson 20-yard field goal	PUR 10-7
2	PUR	Anderson 37-yard field goal	PUR 13-7
2	PUR	Anderson 36-yard field goal	PUR 16-7
2	PUR	Young 43-yard pass from Herrmann (Anderson kick)	PUR 23-7
3	PUR	Smith 1-yard run (Anderson kick)	PUR 30-7
3	PUR	Owen 1-yard run (Anderson kick)	PUR 37-7
3	PUR	Kay 75-yard interception return (Anderson kick)	PUR 44-7
3	PUR	Young 9-yard pass from Herrmann (Anderson kick)	PUR 51-7
4	IOWA	Chappelle 72-yard pass from Gales (pass failed)	PUR 51-13
4	PUR	Jones 1-yard run (Anderson kick)	PUR 58-13

Purdue (AP No. 17) defeated Iowa, 58–13, at Ross–Ade Stadium in West Lafayette. Mark Herrmann set a Purdue single-game record with 439 passing yards on 26 of 34 passing. Herrmannalso set an NCAA career record with 1,151 pass completions.

=== Michigan ===
Michigan defeated Purdue, 26–0, for Michigan's third consecutive shut out. The victory was particularly impressive as the Wolverines held Purdue's record-setting quarterback, Mark Herrmann, to 129 passing yard (24 in the second half), intercepted four of Herrmann's passes, and did not allow a first down by Purdue in the second half. Coach Schembechler credited Michigan defensive coordinator Bill McCartney with the strategy of playing six defensive backs that held Purdue's offense scoreless.

=== Indiana ===
Indiana Hoosiers (6–4) at Purdue Boilermakers (7–3)

Quarter	1	2	3	4	Total
Indiana	3	7	0	13	23
Purdue	0	3	14	7	24

at Ross–Ade Stadium, West Lafayette, Indiana

- Date: November 22, 1980
- Game attendance: 71,629

Game information

First quarter

- IND – Kevin Kellogg 20-yard field goal. Indiana 3–0.

Second quarter

- IND – Lonnie Johnson 5-yard run (Kevin Kellogg kick), 6:16. Indiana 10–0. Drive: 84 yards.
- PUR – Rick Anderson 19-yard field goal. Indiana 10–3.

Third quarter

- PUR – Ben McCall 1-yard run (Rick Anderson kick). Tie 10–10.
- PUR – Bart Burrell 20-yard pass from Mark Herrmann (Rick Anderson kick). Purdue 17–10.

Fourth quarter

- IND – Lonnie Johnson 1-yard run (Kevin Kellogg kick). Tie 17–17.
- PUR – Ben McCall 4-yard run (Rick Anderson kick), 8:56. Purdue 24–17.
- IND – Steve Corso 10-yard pass from Tim Clifford (pass failed), 0:17. Purdue 24–23.

Top passers

- PUR – Mark Herrmann – 19/23, 323 yards, TD

Top rushers

- IND – Lonnie Johnson – 220 yards, 2 TD

External videos
- 1980 Indiana at Purdue game film – Part 1 (no sound)
- 1980 Indiana at Purdue game film - Part 2 (no sound)

In the annual battle for the Old Oaken Bucket, Purdue defeated Indiana, 24–23, in West Lafayette. Purdue led, 24–17, with 21 seconds left when Tim Clifford threw a touchdown pass to Steve Corso (Indiana coach Lee Corso's son). Rather than kick an extra point to tie the game, Indiana coach Corso called for a pass play to win the game; the pass was knocked down by linebacker Mike Marks, and Purdue preserved a one-point lead. The Hoosiers regained possession on the onside kick but Don Geisler missed a 59-yard field goal as time expired. In his final home game, Mark Herrmann finished 19 of 23 for 323 yards and a touchdown.

=== Liberty Bowl ===
At the Liberty Bowl in Memphis, Purdue defeated Missouri, 28–25. Mark Herrmann completed his Purdue career with his third MVP award in a bowl game, and the Boilermakers' third consecutive bowl game victory.

== Roster ==
1980 Purdue Boilermakers football team roster
Players
Coaches
Offense

Pos.	#	Name	Class
TE	84	Tom Barr	Jr
WR	1	Steve Bryant	Jr
WR	87	Bart Burrell	Sr
QB		Scott Campbell	Fr
OT	76	Henry Feil	Jr
WR	47	Mike Fuetterer	Jr
G	52	Ray Gunner	Sr
QB	9	Mark Herrmann	Sr
G	57	Tim Hull	Sr
OT	75	Tom Jelesky	So
FB	37	John Macon	Sr
RB	13	Ben McCall	Sr
C	63	Pete Quinn (C)	Sr
RB	21	Jimmy Smith	So
TE	80	Dave Young	Sr

Defense

Pos.	#	Name	Class
DT	94	Calvin Clark	Sr
OLB	60	David Frye
DT	96	Paul Hanna	Jr
CB	38	Bill Kay	Sr
OLB	15	Tom Kingsbury (C)	Sr
ILB	59	Jim Looney	Sr
ILB	62	Mike Marks	Sr
S	34	Marcus McKinnie	Jr
MG	53	Tom Munro	Jr
S	43	Tim Seneff	Jr
S	10	Mark Adamle	Sr
CB	36	Bobby Williams	Sr

Special teams

Pos.	#	Name	Class
K	2	Rick Anderson
P	19	Jim Bosche
P	5	Greg Hayes	Jr

Head coach

- Jim Young

Coordinators/assistant coaches

- Bill Baker
- Leon Burtnett
- Duck Dullaghan
- Mike Hankwitz
- Randy Hart
- Lee Larkins
- Doug Redmann
- Bob Spoo

Legend

- (C) Team captain
- (S) Suspended
- (I) Ineligible
- Injured
- Redshirt

== Awards ==
- Consensus All-Americans: QB Mark Herrmann (unanimous – AFCA, Football News, AP, FWAA, UPI, Walter Camp), TE Dave Young (unanimous – AFCA, AP, FWAA, Sporting News, UPI)
- All-Big Ten: QB Mark Herrmann (1st), DB Bill Kay (1st), LB James Looney (1st), TE Dave Young (1st), K Rick Anderson (2nd), WR Bart Burrell (2nd), LB Tom Kingsbury (2nd), LB Mike Marks (2nd), SS Tim Seneff (2nd)
- Chicago Tribune MVP: QB Mark Herrmann
- Big Ten MVP: QB Mark Herrmann
