= 1980 Iowa Hawkeyes football team =

American college football season

1980 Iowa Hawkeyes football
- Conference: Big Ten Conference
- Record: 4–7 (4–4 Big Ten)
- Head coach: Hayden Fry (2nd season)
- Offensive coordinator: Bill Snyder (2nd season)
- Offensive scheme: Pro-style
- Defensive coordinator: Bill Brashier (2nd season)
- Base defense: 5–2
- MVP: Keith Chappelle
- Captains: Kent Ellis; John Harty; Dean McKillip; Matt Petrzelka; Bryan Skradis; Phil Suess
- Home stadium: Kinnick Stadium

1980 Big Ten Conference football standings
	Conf.					Overall
Team	W		L		T	W		L		T
No. 4 Michigan $	8	–	0	–	0	10	–	2	–	0
No. 15 Ohio State	7	–	1	–	0	9	–	3	–	0
No. 17 Purdue	7	–	1	–	0	9	–	3	–	0
Iowa	4	–	4	–	0	4	–	7	–	0
Minnesota	4	–	5	–	0	5	–	6	–	0
Indiana	3	–	5	–	0	6	–	5	–	0
Wisconsin	3	–	5	–	0	4	–	7	–	0
Illinois	3	–	5	–	0	3	–	7	–	1
Michigan State	2	–	6	–	0	3	–	8	–	0
Northwestern	0	–	9	–	0	0	–	11	–	0
$ – Conference champion; Rankings from AP Poll

The 1980 Iowa Hawkeyes football team was an American football team that represented the University of Iowa in the Big Ten Conference during the 1980 Big Ten football season. In their second season under head coach Hayden Fry, the Hawkeyes compiled a 4–7 record (4–4 against Big Ten opponents), finished in fourth place in the Big Ten, and were outscored by a tota of 238 to 154.

The team's statistical leaders included Phil Suess with 1,031 passing yards, Jeff Brown with 673 rushing yards, and Keith Chappelle with 1,037 receiving yards and 36 points scored. Chappelle's 1,037 receiving yards led the Big Ten. Defensive tackle John Harty received second-team All-America honors from the UPI and NEA.

The team played its home games in Kinnick Stadium in Iowa City, Iowa.

== Schedule ==
Date	Opponent	Site	Result	Attendance	Source
September 13	at Indiana	Memorial Stadium; Bloomington, IN	W 16–7	50,173	
September 20	at No. 6 Nebraska*	Memorial Stadium; Lincoln, NE	L 0–57	76,029	
September 27	Iowa State*	Kinnick Stadium; Iowa City, IA (rivalry)	L 7–10	60,145	
October 4	Arizona*	Kinnick Stadium; Iowa City, IA	L 3–5	59,950	
October 11	Illinois	Kinnick Stadium; Iowa City, IA	L 14–20	59,780	
October 18	Northwestern^{†}	Kinnick Stadium; Iowa City, IA	W 25–3	59,990	
October 25	at Minnesota	Memorial Stadium; Minneapolis, MN (rivalry)	L 6–24	58,158	
November 1	Wisconsin	Kinnick Stadium; Iowa City, IA (rivalry)	W 22–13	59,995	
November 8	at No. 17 Purdue	Ross–Ade Stadium; West Lafayette, IN	L 13–58	68,775	
November 15	No. 7 Ohio State	Kinnick Stadium; Iowa City, IA	L 7–41	59,890	
November 22	at Michigan State	Spartan Stadium; East Lansing, MI	W 41–0	55,123	
*Non-conference game; ^{†}Homecoming; Rankings from AP Poll released prior to the game

== Game summaries ==
=== At Indiana ===
Iowa at Indiana

Team	1	2	3	4	Total
• Hawkeyes	0	9	0	7	16
Hoosiers	0	0	0	7	7

- Date: September 13
- Location: Memorial Stadium, Bloomington, IN
- Game attendance: 50,173

On September 13, Iowa opened its 1980 season with a 16–7 victory over Indiana. Jeff Brown rushed for 176 yards and caught five passes in his first start as Iowa's tailback.

=== At Nebraska ===
Iowa at Nebraska

Team	1	2	3	4	Total
Hawkeyes	0	0	0	0	0
• No. 6 Cornhuskers	14	21	7	15	57

- Date: 1980-09-20
- Location: Memorial Stadium, Lincoln, NE
- Game attendance: 76,029

On September 20, in the Iowa–Nebraska football rivalry, Iowa was "humiliated" by Nebraska (AP No. 6) by a 57–0 score in front of a crowd of 76,029 in Lincoln, Nebraska. The 57-point loss was the worst football defeat for Iowa in 30 years. Nebraska's Jarvis Redwine rushed for 153 yards on 12 carries.

=== Iowa State ===
Iowa State at Iowa

Team	1	2	3	4	Total
• Cyclones	0	7	3	0	10
Hawkeyes	0	7	0	0	7

- Date: September 27
- Location: Kinnick Stadium, Iowa City, IA
- Game attendance: 60,145

On September 27, Iowa played Iowa State in the fourth modern edition of the Iowa–Iowa State football rivalry, a game dubbed "Sic Em IV". Iowa lost by a 10–7 score before a crowd of 60,145 at Kinnick Stadium in Iowa City. Iowa quarterback Phil Suess threw a 20-yard touchdown pass in the second quarter, but he was unavailable to play in the second half after sustaining a sprained shoulder on his throwing arm. With less than a minute to go, Iowa drove to Iowa State's nine-yard line, but opted to go for the win rather than kick a game-tying field goal.

=== Arizona ===
Arizona at Iowa

Team	1	2	3	4	Total
• Wildcats	2	3	0	0	5
Hawkeyes	0	0	0	3	3

- Date: October 4
- Location: Kinnick Stadium, Iowa City, IA
- Game attendance: 59,950

Scoring summary
1	12:07	ARIZ	Safety, punt blocked by Ware out of end zone	ARIZ 2–0
2	7:31	ARIZ	Weber 37-yard field goal	ARIZ 5–0
4	9:23	IOWA	Reggie Roby 36-yard field goal	ARIZ 5–3

On October 4, Iowa lost to Arizona, 5–3, before a crowd of 59,950 at Kinnick Stadium in Iowa City. After fans booed the Hawkeyes during the game, Iowa coach Hayden Fry noted that "Iowa fans have more experience at booing than anybody else in the country." Iowa's only points came on a Reggie Roby field goal in the fourth quarter. Roby then missed a 48-yard attempt with 2:28 remaining in the game. Iowa also gave up two points on a safety when Arizona blocked a punt out of the end zone.

=== Illinois ===
On October 11, Illinois defeated Iowa, 20–14, before a crowd of 59,780 at Kinnick Stadium. Illinois led, 20-0, early in the third quarter when Illinois cornerback Rick George returned a fumble 13 yards for a touchdown on the third play of the second half. Iowa then mounted a comeback that fell short. Keith Chappelle led the comeback effort, catching two touchdown passes in the second half. Chappelle broke an Iowa single-game record with 191 receiving yards and tied another with 11 receptions.

=== Northwestern ===
On October 18, Iowa defeated Northwestern, 25–3, before a homecoming crowd of 59,990 in Iowa City. In his first game as Iowa's starting tailback, Phil Blatcher rushed for 148 yards on 19 carries, including a 51-yard gain on a Statue of Liberty play, and also caught a touchdown pass.

=== At Minnesota ===
On October 25, in the annual battle for the Floyd of Rosedale trophy, Minnesota defeated Iowa, 24–6, before a crowd of 58,158 in Minneapolis. Iowa fumbled eight times, gave up eight sacks, and managed to score only two field goals. Marion Barber, Jr. scored three rushing touchdowns for Minnesota.

=== Wisconsin ===
On November 1, Iowa defeated Wisconsin, 22–13, in Iowa City. In his first game as Iowa's starting quarterback, Pete Gales completed nine of 22 passes for 161 yards and rushed for 41 yards. One of Gales' completions was good for 54 yards and a touchdown to Keith Chappelle. Iowa scored another touchdown when Iowa linebacker Andre Tippett forced a fumble by Wisconsin quarterback John Josten, and Mark Bortz recovered the ball in the end zone.

=== At Purdue ===
Iowa at Purdue

Team	1	2	3	4	Total
Hawkeyes	7	0	0	6	13
• No. 17 Boilermakers	10	13	28	7	58

- Date: November 8
- Location: Ross–Ade Stadium, West Lafayette, Indiana

Scoring summary
1	PUR	Smith 9-yard pass from Herrmann (Anderson kick)	PUR 7-0
1	IOWA	Gales 4-yard run (Olejniczak kick)	Tied 7-7
1	PUR	Anderson 20-yard field goal	PUR 10-7
2	PUR	Anderson 37-yard field goal	PUR 13-7
2	PUR	Anderson 36-yard field goal	PUR 16-7
2	PUR	Young 43-yard pass from Herrmann (Anderson kick)	PUR 23-7
3	PUR	Smith 1-yard run (Anderson kick)	PUR 30-7
3	PUR	Owen 1-yard run (Anderson kick)	PUR 37-7
3	PUR	Kay 75-yard interception return (Anderson kick)	PUR 44-7
3	PUR	Young 9-yard pass from Herrmann (Anderson kick)	PUR 51-7
4	IOWA	Chappelle 72-yard pass from Gales (pass failed)	PUR 51-13
4	PUR	Jones 1-yard run (Anderson kick)	PUR 58-13

On November 8, #17 Purdue defeated Iowa, 58–13, at Ross–Ade Stadium in West Lafayette. Mark Herrmann set a Purdue single-game record with 439 passing yards. Hermann also set an NCAA career record with 1,151 pass completions.

=== Ohio State ===
Ohio State at Iowa

Team	1	2	3	4	Total
• No. 7 Buckeyes	21	3	0	17	41
Hawkeyes	0	7	0	0	7

- Date: November 15
- Location: Kinnick Stadium
- Game attendance: 59,890

On November 15, Ohio State easily defeated Iowa, 41–7, in Iowa City. Art Schlichter threw two touchdown passes, and Calvin Murray rushed for 183 yards to lead the Buckeyes.

=== At Michigan State ===
Iowa at Michigan State

Team	1	2	3	4	Total
• Hawkeyes	13	14	0	14	41
Spartans	0	0	0	0	0

- Date: November 22
- Location: Spartan Stadium, East Lansing, MI
- Game start: 1:03 p.m. EST
- Elapsed time: 3:00
- Game attendance: 55,123
- Game weather: 50 °F (10 °C), Mostly sunny, Wind SW 18 mph (29 km/h)
- Referee: Tom Quinn

Scoring summary
Q1	9:53	IOWA	Reggie Roby 39-yard field goal	IOWA 3–0
Q1	4:14	IOWA	Roby 48-yard field goal	IOWA 6–0
Q1	1:03	IOWA	Love-Jordan 12-yard run (Olejniczak kick)	IOWA 13–0
Q2	13:56	IOWA	McKillip 1-yard run (Olejniczak kick)	IOWA 20–0
Q2	1:30	IOWA	Olejniczak 22-yard pass from Gales (Olejniczak kick)	IOWA 27–0
Q4	9:49	IOWA	Chappelle 11-yard pass from Gales (Olejniczak kick)	IOWA 34–0
Q4	2:30	IOWA	Person 15-yard pass from Gales (Olejniczak kick)	IOWA 41–0

On November 22, Iowa shut out Michigan State, 41–0, before a disappointed crowd of 55,123 fans at Spartan Stadium in East Lansing. After the game, Iowa coach Hayden Fry called it a "real fine victory," while Michigan State coach Muddy Waters said: "You saw it – rotten, lousy flat. It was about the worst game I ever saw. We were afraid it would happen, scared to death it would happen with an inexperienced team like we have."

== Roster ==
1980 Iowa Hawkeyes football team roster
Players
Coaches
Offense

Pos.	#	Name	Class
RB	28	Phil Blatcher	Jr
QB	11	Gordy Bohannan (injured)	Sr
RB	27	Jeff Brown	Jr
WR	19	Keith Chappelle	Sr
QB	12	Pete Gales	Jr
RB	26	Norm Granger	Fr
G	76	Ron Hallstrom	Jr
C	54	Jay Hilgenberg	Sr
G	55	Joe Levelis	Fr
OT	79	Brett Miller	So
WR	83	Lon Olejniczak	So
RB	22	Eddie Phillips	Fr
QB	16	Phil Suess (C)	Sr

Defense

Pos.	#	Name	Class
DL	63	Mark Bortz	So
DL	58	Pat Dean	Jr
DB	10	Jim Frazier	Jr
DT	75	John Harty (C)	Sr
DL		Michael Hooks
DB	43	Lou King	Jr
DB	41	Bob Stoops	So
DE	99	Andre Tippett	Jr
DL	94	Brad Webb	Jr

Special teams

Pos.	#	Name	Class
P/K	7	Reggie Roby	So
K	83	Lon Olejniczak	So

Head coach

- Hayden Fry

Coordinators/assistant coaches

- Bill Snyder – Offensive Coordinator/Quarterbacks
- Bill Brashier – Defensive Coordinator
- Carl Jackson – Running backs
- Del Miller – Offensive assistant
- Dan McCarney – Defensive line
- Barry Alvarez – Linebackers
- Don Patterson – Defensive Backs
- Bernie Wyatt – Defensive Ends/Recruiting Coordinator
- Bill Dervich – Strength and Conditioning

Legend

- (C) Team captain
- (S) Suspended
- (I) Ineligible
- Injured
- Redshirt

== 1981 NFL draft ==
Player	Position	Round	Pick	NFL club
John Harty	Defensive tackle	2	36	San Francisco 49ers
Matt Petrzelka	Tackle	11	280	San Diego Chargers
Keith Chappelle	Wide receiver	11	301	Atlanta Falcons
