= 1980 Michigan State Spartans football team =

American college football season

1980 Michigan State Spartans football
- Conference: Big Ten Conference
- Record: 3–8 (2–6 Big Ten)
- Head coach: Muddy Waters (1st season)
- Offensive coordinator: Joe Pendry (1st season)
- MVP: Steve Smith
- Captains: Steve Smith; Rodney Strata; George Cooper; Bernard Hay
- Home stadium: Spartan Stadium

1980 Big Ten Conference football standings
	Conf.					Overall
Team	W		L		T	W		L		T
No. 4 Michigan $	8	–	0	–	0	10	–	2	–	0
No. 15 Ohio State	7	–	1	–	0	9	–	3	–	0
No. 17 Purdue	7	–	1	–	0	9	–	3	–	0
Iowa	4	–	4	–	0	4	–	7	–	0
Minnesota	4	–	5	–	0	5	–	6	–	0
Indiana	3	–	5	–	0	6	–	5	–	0
Wisconsin	3	–	5	–	0	4	–	7	–	0
Illinois	3	–	5	–	0	3	–	7	–	1
Michigan State	2	–	6	–	0	3	–	8	–	0
Northwestern	0	–	9	–	0	0	–	11	–	0
$ – Conference champion; Rankings from AP Poll

The 1980 Michigan State Spartans football team was an American football team that represented Michigan State University as a member of the Big Ten Conference during the 1980 Big Ten football season. In their first season under head coach Muddy Waters, the Spartans compiled a 3–8 record (2–6 in conference games), finished in ninth place in the Big Ten, and were outscored by a total of 281 to 221. In two games against ranked opponents, they lost to No. 7 Notre Dame and No. 9 Ohio State. The team's .273 winning percentage was the worst in program history since the winless 1917 season.

In January 1980, Michigan State hired Frank "Muddy" Waters as its new head football coach after Darryl Rogers resigned to take over as Arizona State's head coach. Waters had played for Michigan State from 1946 to 1949 and had been a head coach at Hillsdale College (1954–1973) and Saginaw Valley State (1975–1979).

The team's statistical leaders included quarterback John Leister with 1,559 passing yards, Steve Smith with 667 rushing yards, Ted Jones with 568 receiving yards, and placekicker Morten Andersen with 57 points. Punter Ray Stachowicz was selected by both the Associated Press (AP) and the United Press International (UPI) as a first-team player on the 1980 All-Big Ten Conference football team. Several Michigan State players also ranked among the Big Ten leaders in various statistical categories, including the following:

- Morten Andersen ranked third in the Big Ten with 12 field goals made and a 66.7 field goal percentage, and seventh with 56 points scored.
- John Leister ranked fourth in the Big Ten with 247 pass attempts and 14 interceptions, and fifth with 1,559 passing yards and 1,658 total yards.
- Thomas Morris ranked second with 185 punt return yards and third with 7.1 yards per punt return.
- Steve Smith ranked fourth with nine touchdowns from scrimmage and sixth with 180 plays from scrimmage and 54 points scored. Smith was also selected as the team's most valuable player.

The team played its home games at Spartan Stadium in East Lansing, Michigan.

== Schedule ==
Date	Opponent	Site	Result	Attendance	Source
September 13	at Illinois	Memorial Stadium; Champaign, IL	L 17–20	46,377	
September 20	at Oregon*	Autzen Stadium; Eugene, OR	L 7–35	30,431	
September 27	Western Michigan*	Spartan Stadium; East Lansing, MI	W 33–7	75,123	
October 4	No. 7 Notre Dame*	Spartan Stadium; East Lansing, MI (rivalry)	L 21–26	76,821	
October 11	at Michigan	Michigan Stadium; Ann Arbor, MI (rivalry)	L 23–27	105,263	
October 18	Wisconsin^{†}	Spartan Stadium; East Lansing, MI	L 7–17	76,173	
October 25	at Purdue	Ross–Ade Stadium; West Lafayette, IN	L 25–36	69,231	
November 1	No. 9 Ohio State	Spartan Stadium; East Lansing, MI	L 16–48	77,153	
November 8	Northwestern	Spartan Stadium; East Lansing, MI	W 42–10	60,157	
November 15	at Minnesota	Memorial Stadium; Minneapolis, MN	W 30–12	30,329	
November 22	Iowa	Spartan Stadium; East Lansing, MI	L 0–41	55,123	
*Non-conference game; ^{†}Homecoming; Rankings from AP Poll released prior to the game

== Game summaries ==
=== At Illinois ===
On September 13, Michigan State lost to Illinois, 20–17, in Champaign, Illinois, to spoil Muddy Waters debut as the Spartans' head coach. Mike Bass kicked the game-winning field goal as time ran out.

=== At Oregon ===
On September 20, Michigan State lost to Oregon, 35–7, at Autzen Stadium in Eugene. After the game, Michigan State coach Muddy Waters said, "They just beat our face off."

=== Western Michigan ===
On September 27, Michigan State defeated Western Michigan, 33–7, before a crowd of 75,12 at Spartan Stadium in East Lansing. The victory was the first of the Muddy Waters era at Michigan State. The Spartans were assisted by five Western Michigan fumbles and two interceptions. The Spartans scored three touchdowns off Western Michigan turnovers. Michigan State tailback Tony Ellis scored three touchdowns. Morten Andersen kicked two field goals for the Spartans.

=== Notre Dame ===
On October 4, Michigan State lost to Notre Dame (ranked No. 7 in the AP Poll), 26–21. Notre Dame running back Phil Carter rushed for 254 yards in the game.

Michigan State honored former head coach Duffy Daugherty at halftime.

=== At Michigan ===
On October 11, in the annual Michigan–Michigan State football rivalry game, Michigan State lost to Michigan, 27–23, before a crowd of 105,263 at Michigan Stadium in Ann Arbor. Michigan took an early 10–0 lead, but Michigan State rallied back, aided by three Morten Andersen field goals, including a 57-yard conversion that set a Michigan State record. In the third quarter, with the score tied 13-13, Michigan State was penalized for roughing the kicker on a field goal attempt The penalty gave Michigan a first down at the nine-yard line, and three plays later John Wangler threw a touchdown pass to Anthony Carter. Stan Edwards rushed for 139 yards for Michigan. Michigan scored its final touchdown on a pass from Wangler to Craig Dunaway. Michigan intercepted a pass in the final minute-and-a-half of the game to stop the Spartans' final drive.

=== Wisconsin ===
On October 18, Michigan State lost to Wisconsin, 17–7, at Spartan Stadium in East Lansing. Wisconsin fullback Dave Mohapp rushed for 138 yards and scored a touchdown. Wisconsin's second touchdown followed a fumbled punt that was recovered in the end zone by Mark Subach.

=== At Purdue ===
On October 25, Purdue defeated Michigan State, 36–25, in West Lafayette. Purdue quarterback completed 24 of 46 passes for 340 yards to break the NCAA career record for passing yardage. Hermann passed the prior record of 7,747 yards set by Jack Thompson from 1976 to 1978. Michigan State quarterback John Leister threw more passes (54) than Hermann, but completed only 18, had five interceptions, and lost a fumble. After the game, Michigan State coach Muddy Waters said, "John is pretty disgusted with himself."

=== Ohio State ===
On November 1, Ohio State (AP No. 9) defeated Michigan State, 48–16, in front of a crowd of 77,153 persons at Spartan Stadium in East Lansing. Ohio State tallied 603 total yards in the game, and the Buckeyes' 48 points was the most allowed by Michigan State since 1976.

=== Northwestern ===
On November 8, Michigan State defeated Northwestern, 42–10, before a crowd of 60,157 at Spartan Stadium in East Lansing. Michigan State tailback Steve Smith rushed for 229 yards and a school record with four touchdowns. The Spartans totaled 571 yards of total offense.

=== At Minnesota ===
On November 15, Michigan State defeated Minnesota, 30–12, before a crowd of 30,329 in Minneapolis. Michigan State quarterback John Leister passed for 209 yards and three touchdowns. Minnesota quarterback Tim Salem completed only 5 of 15 passes, threw two interceptions, and fumbled twice.

=== Iowa ===
On November 22, Iowa shut out Michigan State, 41–0, before a disappointed crowd of 55,123 fans at Spartan Stadium in East Lansing. After the game, Iowa coach Hayden Fry called it a "real fine victory," while Michigan State coach Muddy Waters said: "You saw it – rotten, lousy flat. It was about the worst game I ever saw. We were afraid it would happen, scared to death it would happen with an inexperienced team like we have."

== Personnel ==
1980 Michigan State Spartans football team roster
Players
Coaches
Offense

Pos.	#	Name	Class
TE	84	Scott Auer	Fr
QB	15	Bryan Clark	Jr
G	66	Mike Densmore	Sr
RB	5	Tony Ellis	So
QB	12	Addie Gaddis	Fr
WR	24	Tony Gilbert	Jr
WR	9	Otis Grant	So
RB	22	James Hodo
RB	44	Rob Holland
RB	42	Derek Hughes
C	51	Joe Jacquemain
WR	25	Mike Jones
WR	21	Ted Jones	So
TE	95	Al Kimichik	Sr
QB	18	John Leister
G	71	Marv Mantos	Jr
C	56	Tom Piette	Jr
RB	30	Bruce Reeves	Sr
RB	45	Andy Schramm	Sr
RB	20	Steve Smith	Sr
G	69	Rod Strata	Sr
WR	38	Daryl Turner	Fr
QB	15	Bert Vaughn	Jr
OT	63	Dave Whittle	Sr
WR	85	Jim Williams	Jr
OT	72	Jeff Wiska	Jr

Defense

Pos.	#	Name	Class
LB	77	Terry Bailey	Jr
LB	54	Carl Banks	Fr
CB	28	Jim Burroughs	Jr
LB	39	George Cooper	Jr
DE	91	Smiley Creswell	Jr
DB	35	Tim Cunningham	Fr
DB	48	Nate Hannah	Fr
DT	93	Bernard Hay	Sr
DT	86	Johnny Lee Haynes	Sr
S	23	Todd Langerveld	So
LB	43	Steve Maidlow	Jr
DB	2	Mike Marshall	Sr
LB	40	John McCormick	Sr
DT	55	Howard McAdoo	So
DB	13	Rick Milhizer	Jr
DL	88	Ron Mitchem	Jr
DB	27	Thomas Morris	Jr
LB	58	Jim Neely	So
DL		Calvin Perkins
DL	83	Joe Stevens	So
S	36	Tony Townsend	Jr
CB	7	Chris Van Pelt	So
DB	29	Carl Williams
CB	32	Van Williams	Jr

Special teams

Pos.	#	Name	Class
K	8	Morten Andersen	Jr
P	19	Ray Stachowicz	Sr

Head coach

- Muddy Waters

Coordinators/assistant coaches

Legend

- (C) Team captain
- (S) Suspended
- (I) Ineligible
- Injured
- Redshirt

== See also ==
- 1980 in Michigan
