= Schuh (disambiguation) =

Schuh is a footwear retailer based in Scotland.

Schuh may also refer to:

- Leder und Schuh, European shoe company
- Schuh (surname)
