= Franz Schuh =

Franz Schuh may refer to:

- Franz Schuh (writer) (born 1947), Austrian novelist, literary critic and essayist
- Franz Schuh (physician) (1804–1865), Austrian pathologist and surgeon
- Franz Schuh (swimmer) (1891–?), Austrian swimmer

== See also ==
- Schuh (disambiguation)
