= 1980 Northwestern Wildcats football team =

American college football season

1980 Northwestern Wildcats football
- Conference: Big Ten Conference
- Record: 0–11 (0–9 Big Ten)
- Head coach: Rick Venturi (3rd season)
- Captains: Chuck Kern; Todd Sheets
- Home stadium: Dyche Stadium

1980 Big Ten Conference football standings
	Conf.					Overall
Team	W		L		T	W		L		T
No. 4 Michigan $	8	–	0	–	0	10	–	2	–	0
No. 15 Ohio State	7	–	1	–	0	9	–	3	–	0
No. 17 Purdue	7	–	1	–	0	9	–	3	–	0
Iowa	4	–	4	–	0	4	–	7	–	0
Minnesota	4	–	5	–	0	5	–	6	–	0
Indiana	3	–	5	–	0	6	–	5	–	0
Wisconsin	3	–	5	–	0	4	–	7	–	0
Illinois	3	–	5	–	0	3	–	7	–	1
Michigan State	2	–	6	–	0	3	–	8	–	0
Northwestern	0	–	9	–	0	0	–	11	–	0
$ – Conference champion; Rankings from AP Poll

The 1980 Northwestern Wildcats team was an American football team that represented Northwestern University during the 1980 Big Ten Conference football season. In their third year under head coach Rick Venturi, the Wildcats finished in last place in the Big Ten Conference (Big Ten), compiled a 0–11 record (0–9 against Big Ten opponents), and were outscored by their opponents by a combined total of 444 to 151. The team played its home games at Dyche Stadium in Evanston, Illinois.

Northwestern finished the season in the midst of a 34-game losing streak, the longest in NCAA Division I-A history. The streak began on September 22, 1979, and ended on September 25, 1982.

The team's statistical leaders included quarterback Mike Kerrigan with 1,816 passing yards, Jeff Cohn with 503 rushing yards, Todd Sheets with 570 receiving yards, and placekicker Jay Anderson with 37 points scored. Several Northwestern players also ranked among the Big Ten leaders in various statistical categories, including the following:

- Mike Kerrigan led the Big Ten with 17 interceptions and ranked third with 173 pass completions and 337 pass attempts and fourth with 1,816 passing yards and 1,789 total yards.
- Lou Tiberi led the conference with 18 kickoff returns and ranked second with 402 kickoff return yards and fourth with 22.3 yards per kickoff return.
- Todd Sheets ranked fifth with 17.3 yards per reception and eighth with 570 receiving yards.

== Schedule ==
Date	Opponent	Site	Result	Attendance	Source
September 6	at Illinois	Memorial Stadium; Champaign, IL (rivalry)	L 9–35	44,222	
September 13	at No. 11 Michigan	Michigan Stadium; Ann Arbor, MI (rivalry)	L 10–17	100,824	
September 20	at No. 16 Washington*	Husky Stadium; Seattle, WA	L 7–45	49,975	
September 27	at Syracuse*	Carrier Dome; Syracuse, NY	L 21–42	34,739	
October 4	Minnesota	Dyche Stadium; Evanston, IL	L 21–49	17,747	
October 11	No. 9 Ohio State	Dyche Stadium; Evanston, IL	L 0–63	29,375	
October 18	at Iowa	Kinnick Stadium; Iowa City, IA	L 3–25	59,990	
October 25	Indiana	Dyche Stadium; Evanston, IL	L 20–35	19,535	
November 1	No. 20 Purdue	Dyche Stadium; Evanston, IL	L 31–52	17,744	
November 8	at Michigan State	Spartan Stadium; East Lansing, MI	L 10–42	60,157	
November 15	Wisconsin	Dyche Stadium; Evanston, IL	L 19–39	17,372	
*Non-conference game; Rankings from AP Poll released prior to the game

== Game summaries ==
=== At Illinois ===
On September 6, in the first conference game of the season, Illinois defeated Northwestern, 35–9, at Memorial Stadium in Champaign, Illinois. It was Illinois' first game under new head coach Mike White and its first victory at Memorial Stadium since October 1977.

=== At Michigan ===
On September 13, Michigan (AP No. 11) defeated Northwestern, 17–10, at Michigan Stadium. Playing in a steady rain, the Wolverines struggled. Anthony Carter had a 17-yard touchdown reception to give Michigan the win.

=== At Washington ===
On September 20, Northwestern lost to Washington (AP No. 16), 45–7, in Seattle. Washington's Toussaint Tyler rushed for 83 yards and scored three touchdowns.

=== At Syracuse ===
On September 27, Northwestern lost to Syracuse, 42–21, before a crowd of 34,738 at the Carrier Dome in Syracuse. Northwestern quarterback Mike Kerrigan set a single-game Northwestern record with 25 completions, passing for 269 yards and three touchdowns. Joe Morris rushed for 172 yards for Syracuse. The game was marred by oranges being repeatedly thrown on the field by students, resulting in two 15-yard penalties and caused Syracuse's quarterback to slip on a peel at the Northwestern one-yard line. Syracuse coach Frank Maloney called the students' conduct both "sinful" and "bush league".

=== Minnesota ===
On October 4, Northwestern lost to Minnesota, 49–21, at Dyche Stadium. Minnesota was led by running backs Marion Barber, Jr. (118 rushing yards, three touchdowns) and Garry White (129 rushing yards, two touchdowns).

=== Ohio State ===
On October 11, Ohio State defeated Northwestern, 63–0, before a homecoming crowd of 29,375 at Dyche Stadium in Evanston. Ohio State led, 42–0, at halftime. Ohio State had 575 total yards, including 418 rushing yards. Calvin Murray had 120 yards and three touchdowns on nine carries. The night before the game, Northwestern coach was served with a lawsuit filed by 22 African American players alleging racial discrimination.

=== At Iowa ===
On October 18, Iowa defeated Northwestern, 25–3, before a homecoming crowd of 59,990 in Iowa City. In his first game as Iowa's starting tailback, Phil Blatcher rushed for 148 yards on 19 carries, including a 51-yard gain on a Statue of Liberty play, and also caught a touchdown pass.

=== Indiana ===
On October 25, Indiana defeated Northwestern, 35–20, in Evanston. Indiana's Lonnie Johnson rushed for 160 yards on 22 carries, and Mike Harkrader added 102 rushing yards.

=== Purdue ===
On November 1, Purdue (AP No. 20) defeated Northwestern, 52–31, before a crowd of 17,744 persons at Dyche Stadium in Evanston. Purdue's 52 points was its highest scoring output in a game since 1947. Purdue running back rushed for 190 yards and scored four touchdown. Mark Herrmann passed for 210 yards and three touchdowns. Hermann also set the all-time record for career pass completions (651) and interceptions (69).

=== At Michigan State ===
On November 8, Michigan State defeated Northwestern, 42–10, before a crowd of 60,157 at Spartan Stadium in East Lansing. Michigan State tailback Steve Smith rushed for 229 yards and a school record with four touchdowns. The Spartans totaled 571 yards of total offense.

=== Wisconsin ===
On November 15, Wisconsin defeated Northwestern, 39–19, in Evanston. Northwestern's Mike Kerrigan passed for 237 yards in the loss.

== Roster ==
1980 Northwestern Wildcats football team roster
Players
Coaches
Offense

Pos.	#	Name	Class
WR	90	Jay Anderson	So
QB	10	Gary Angotti	Fr
WR	84	Dave Bahoric	Jr
G	66	Kelby Brown	Jr
RB	36	Jim Browne	Fr
G	67	Jim Crowder	Jr
RB	30	Jeff Cohn	So
G	65	Bill Draznik	Sr
RB	3	Ricky Edwards	So
G	63	Pat Erdman	So
C	55	Bill Gerber	Jr
FB	42	Mark Ignatowicz	Fr
TE	93	John Finn	Jr
OT	76	Jim Ford	Sr
C	55	Bill Gerber	Jr
QB	2	Dana Hemphill	Sr
RB	23	Tim Hill	Sr
TE	80	Chris Hinton	So
WR	22	Todd Jenkins	Fr
TE	92	Steve Kaiser	So
QB	7	Gary Keider	So
QB	12	Mike Kerrigan	Jr
C	54	Jack Kreider	So
FB	32	Dave Mishler	Sr
WR	82	Tom North	Sr
RB	37	Tracy Parsons	Fr
OT	78	Bob Pratt	So
WR	85	Randy Sconyers	Fr
TE	47	Rich Raffin	So
WR	26	Todd Sheets	Sr
OT	75	Rob Taylor	Jr
RB	1	Kenny Watkins	Fr

Defense

Pos.	#	Name	Class
DB	20	Mark Adams	Sr
FS	15	Bobby Anderson	So
DT	94	Don Bambauer	Jr
LB	44	David Callway	So
LB	11	Chris Capstran	Jr
DB	14	Ron Coleman	Sr
LB	91	Kenny Gregory	Fr
DB	29	Roosevelt Groves	So
LB	35	Mike Guendling	Fr
DB	41	Dave Hoffman	Sr
DB	5	Percy Holden	Fr
LB	53	Jim Karstens	So
LB	21	Chuck Kern	Sr
DB	19	Rawle King	Jr
DL	39	Tom Maul	Jr
DL	52	Richard Moore	So
LB	69	Steve Pals	Sr
DB	9	Steve Prezioso	Jr
DB	18	David Shaw	So
LB	38	Lenson Staples	Fr
DL	40	Brian Stasiewicz	Sr
DB	13	Lou Tiberi	Jr
LB	45	Jer Woods	So

Special teams

Pos.	#	Name	Class
P, QB	4	John Kidd	Fr
P	28	Bob Schmitt	Sr

Head coach

- Rick Venturi

Coordinators/assistant coaches

- Mike Westhoff – Offensive line

Legend

- (C) Team captain
- (S) Suspended
- (I) Ineligible
- Injured
- Redshirt
