= Dave Ahrens =

American football player (born 1958)

No. 58, 57, 50
- Position: Linebacker

Personal information
- Born: December 5, 1958 (age 67); Cedar Falls, Iowa, U.S.
- Listed height: 6 ft 3 in (1.91 m)
- Listed weight: 238 lb (108 kg)

Career information
- High school: Oregon (Oregon, Wisconsin)
- College: Wisconsin
- NFL draft: 1981: 6th round, 143rd overall pick

Career history
- St. Louis Cardinals (1981–1984); Indianapolis Colts (1985–1987); Detroit Lions (1988); Miami Dolphins (1989); Seattle Seahawks (1990)

Awards and highlights
- 2× Second-team All-Big Ten (1979, 1980)

Career NFL statistics
- Sacks: 3
- Interceptions: 1
- Fumble recoveries: 4
- Stats at Pro Football Reference

Dave Ahrens (born December 5, 1958) is an American former professional football player who was a linebacker for 10 seasons in the National Football League (NFL). The Cedar Falls, Iowa native played college football for the Wisconsin Badgers.

== Early life ==
Ahrens played high school at Oregon High School in Oregon, Wisconsin, where he played fullback and linebacker and was named All-State by the Associated Press his senior year. Ahrens started out at the University of Wisconsin–Madison playing fullback but switched to linebacker and was captain and Team MVP of the 1980 Badgers team.

== Professional career ==
=== St. Louis Cardinals ===
Ahrens was selected by the St. Louis Cardinals in the sixth round (143rd overall) of the 1981 NFL draft. He recorded his only interception his rookie year, which was returned for a touchdown. Ahrens played in all the games and started ten his rookie season, but his playing time diminished and after four years he was traded to the Indianapolis Colts for a tenth-round pick in the 1986 NFL draft.

=== Indianapolis Colts ===
Ahrens was traded to the Indianapolis Colts before the 1985 season. He did not start a single game in 1985 but had arguably his best NFL season in 1986, starting ten games, and registering two quarterback sacks, one of them helping the Colts secure their first win of the year late in the season against the Atlanta Falcons.

=== Detroit Lions ===
Ahrens spent 1988 with the Detroit Lions but only played in half the games and was left unprotected.

=== Miami Dolphins ===
Ahrens was signed by the Miami Dolphins before 1989 and recorded one sack with the team. Due to salary concerns, the Dolphins released him but he did sign a Plan B contract.

=== Seattle Seahawks ===
Ahrens signed with the Seattle Seahawks in free agency before the 1990 season. He was cut during final cuts only to be re-signed by the team. Ahrens was placed on injured reserve following a broken leg against the Denver Broncos late in the season.

== Later life ==
Ahrens spent the 1991 season with the Colts as an assistant coach. He was part of a large group of Colts players named in a 2011 concussion lawsuit against the NFL.
