= Jim Hilles =

American football player and coach (born 1936)

Biographical details
- Born: September 24, 1936 (age 90); Warren, Ohio, U.S.

Playing career
- 1955–1957: Ohio

Coaching career (HC unless noted)
- 1972–1977: Ball State (DC/LB)
- 1978–1985: Wisconsin (DC/LB)
- 1986: Wisconsin (interim HC)
- 1987: Kent State (DC/LB)
- 1988–1990: Kansas (DC/LB)
- 1991–1993: Toronto Argonauts (DL)
- 1994: Ottawa Rough Riders (DL)
- 1995: Illinois State (DC/LB)
- 1996: Western New Mexico (DC/DL/LB)
- 1997: Edmonton Eskimos (DL)
- 1998–2000: Amsterdam Admirals (DL)
- 2001: Los Angeles Xtreme (DC/LB)

Head coaching record
- Overall: 3–9 (college); 17–3 (high school)

James L. Hilles (born September 24, 1936) is an American former football player and coach. He served as the interim head football coach at University of Wisconsin–Madison for one season in 1986, compiling a record of 3–9.

== Early life, playing career, and education ==
Hilles is a native of Warren, Ohio. As a player, Hilles lettered three years (1955–1957) in football at Ohio University, where he was selected captain his senior year. He received Mid-American Conference honorable mention before earning a Bachelor's degree in 1958. He received his Master of Arts degree in Secondary Administration from Westminster College in 1971.

== Coaching career ==
After graduation, Hilles coached two seasons at Wilmington, Ohio and later moved to Toledo, Ohio for five years of coaching at Libbey High School and Macomber High School. While in Toledo, Hilles served as player-coach for the Toledo Tornadoes in the Continental Football League. He returned to Warren in 1966 as defensive coordinator before being promoted to head coach in 1970 at Western Reserve High School. He coached the Western Reserve football team in Warren to a 17–3 record during the 1970 and 1971 seasons.

In 1972, Hilles joined the staff of Dave McClain at Ball State University. During his six seasons, Hilles helped Ball State join the Mid-American Conference in 1973, achieve NCAA Division I status in 1974, and was defensive coordinator of the 1976 MAC championship team.

Hilles continued to be the defensive coordinator and inside linebackers coach on Dave McClain's staff at the University of Wisconsin–Madison (1978–1985). After McClain's death on April 28, 1986, Hilles was named interim head football coach for the 1986 season.

In 1987, Hilles joined the staff of Glen Mason at Kent State University. He followed Mason to the University of Kansas the next year and was the Jayhawks' defensive coordinator (1988–1990). Hilles coached in the Canadian Football League, serving as defensive line coach for the Toronto Argonauts (1991–1993), Ottawa Rough Riders (1994), and Edmonton Eskimos (1997). He later coached for the Amsterdam Admirals in the NFL Europe league (1998–2000). In 2001, Hilles served as defensive coordinator for the Los Angeles Xtreme of the XFL.

== Head coaching record ==
=== College ===
| Year | Team | Overall | Conference | Standing | Bowl/playoffs |
|---|---|---|---|---|---|
Wisconsin Badgers (Big Ten Conference) (1986)
| 1986 | Wisconsin | 3–9 | 2–6 | T–8th | |
| Wisconsin: | | 3–9 | 2–6 | | |
| Total: | | 3–9 | | | |
