= Keith Ferguson (American football) =

American football player (born 1959)

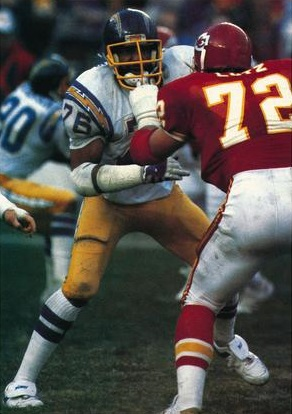
- Ferguson c. 1984

No. 76, 77
- Position: Defensive end

Personal information
- Born: April 3, 1959 (age 67); Miami, Florida, U.S.
- Listed height: 6 ft 5 in (1.96 m)
- Listed weight: 252 lb (114 kg)

Career information
- High school: Miami Edison
- College: Ohio State
- NFL draft: 1981: 5th round, 131st overall pick

Career history
- San Diego Chargers (1981–1985); Detroit Lions (1985–1990)

Career NFL statistics
- Sacks: 50.5
- Fumble recoveries: 7
- Interceptions: 1
- Stats at Pro Football Reference

Keith Tyrone Ferguson (born April 3, 1959) is an American former professional football player who was a defensive end the National Football League (NFL) from 1981 through 1990. He played college football for the Ohio State Buckeyes.

== Early life ==
Ferguson was born in Miami, Florida. A Prep All American at Miami Edison High School, he was one of the most heavily recruited high school players to come out of Miami-Dade County in the 1970s. During his sophomore year in 1974, Ferguson played in the final Thanksgiving Day rivalry game between Edison vs. Miami High at the Orange Bowl. Ferguson mostly played offensive line in high school.

== College career ==
Ferguson accepted an athletic scholarship to attend Ohio State University in Columbus Ohio, where he went on to become a defensive lineman for coach Woody Hayes and Earle Bruce from 1977 to 1980.

== Professional career ==
The San Diego Chargers selected Ferguson in the fifth round of the 1981 NFL draft. He played 10 seasons in the NFL with the Chargers and the Detroit Lions. His best season came in 1986 for the Lions, when he started 15 games, recorded 9.5 sacks, recovered one fumble, and had one interception.
