= 1980 Illinois Fighting Illini football team =

American college football season

1980 Illinois Fighting Illini football
- Conference: Big Ten Conference
- Record: 3–7–1 (3–5 Big Ten)
- Head coach: Mike White (1st season)
- MVP: Dave Wilson
- Captains: Dave Wilson; Dave Dwyer; Ron Ferrari
- Home stadium: Memorial Stadium

1980 Big Ten Conference football standings
	Conf.					Overall
Team	W		L		T	W		L		T
No. 4 Michigan $	8	–	0	–	0	10	–	2	–	0
No. 15 Ohio State	7	–	1	–	0	9	–	3	–	0
No. 17 Purdue	7	–	1	–	0	9	–	3	–	0
Iowa	4	–	4	–	0	4	–	7	–	0
Minnesota	4	–	5	–	0	5	–	6	–	0
Indiana	3	–	5	–	0	6	–	5	–	0
Wisconsin	3	–	5	–	0	4	–	7	–	0
Illinois	3	–	5	–	0	3	–	7	–	1
Michigan State	2	–	6	–	0	3	–	8	–	0
Northwestern	0	–	9	–	0	0	–	11	–	0
$ – Conference champion; Rankings from AP Poll

The 1980 Illinois Fighting Illini football team was an American football team that represented the University of Illinois as a member of the Big Ten Conference during the 1980 Big Ten season. The Illini finished in three-way tie for sixth place in the Big Ten, compiled a 3–7–1 record (3–5 in Big Ten games), and outscored opponents by a total of 326 to 241.

In December 1979, Illinois hired Mike White to replace Gary Moeller. Moeller's teams had gone 3-16-3 in the prior two seasons. White had been an assistant coach with the San Francisco 49ers in 1978 and 1979 and was the head coach for the California Golden Bears from 1972 to 1977. The 1980 season was Illinois' first under coach White.

Quarterback Dave Wilson led the Big Ten with 245 pass completions, 463 attempts, 3,154 passing yards, and 19 passing touchdowns. The team's other statistical leaders included running back Mike Holmes (305 rushing yards, 4.4 yards per carry), wide receiver Mike Martin (555 receiving yards), and placekicker Mike Bass (45 points, 24 of 25 extra points, seven of 11 field goals). Wilson was selected as the team's most valuable player.

Several Illinois players also ranked among the Big Ten leaders in various statistical categories, including the following:

- Dave Wilson led the Big Ten with 245 pass completions, 463 pass attempts, and 503 total plays and ranked second with 3,154 passing yards, 19 passing touchdowns, and 2,960 total yards.
- Mike Martin ranked second in the Big Ten with 17.9 yard per reception and 8.2 yards per punt return, fourth with 123 punt return yards, and 10th with 555 receiving yards.

The team played its home games at Memorial Stadium in Champaign, Illinois.

== Schedule ==
Date	Opponent	Site	Result	Attendance	Source
September 6	Northwestern	Memorial Stadium; Champaign, IL (rivalry)	W 35–9	44,222	
September 13	Michigan State	Memorial Stadium; Champaign, IL	W 20–17	46,377	
September 20	at No. 15 Missouri*	Faurot Field; Columbia, MO (rivalry)	L 7–52	66,306	
September 27	Air Force*	Memorial Stadium; Champaign, IL	T 20–20	45,638	
October 4	Mississippi State*	Memorial Stadium; Champaign, IL	L 21–28	60,889	
October 11	at Iowa	Kinnick Stadium; Iowa City, IA	W 20–14	59,780	
October 18	Purdue	Memorial Stadium; Champaign, IL (rivalry)	L 20–45	62,121	
October 25	at Michigan	Michigan Stadium; Ann Arbor, MI (rivalry)	L 14–45	105,109	
November 1	Minnesota	Memorial Stadium; Champaign, IL	L 18–21	51,202	
November 8	at No. 7 Ohio State	Ohio Stadium; Columbus, OH (Illibuck)	L 42–49	87,952	
November 15	at Indiana	Memorial Stadium; Bloomington, IN (rivalry)	L 24–26	38,128	
*Non-conference game; Rankings from AP Poll released prior to the game

== Preseason ==
In December 1979, Illinois hired Mike White to replace Gary Moeller. Moeller's teams had gone 3–16–3 in the prior two seasons. White had been an assistant coach with the San Francisco 49ers in 1978 and 1979 and was the head coach for the California Golden Bears from 1972 to 1977.

== Game summaries ==
=== Northwestern ===
On September 6, in the first game of the Big Ten season, Illinois defeated Northwestern, 35–9, at Memorial Stadium in Champaign, Illinois. It was Illinois' first game under new head coach Mike White and its first victory at Memorial Stadium since October 1977.

=== Michigan State ===
On September 13, Illinois defeated Michigan State, 20–17, to spoil Muddy Waters debut as the Spartans' head coach. Mike Bass kicked the game-winning field goal as time ran out.

=== At Missouri ===
On September 20, in the Illinois–Missouri football rivalry game, Illinois lost to Missouri (AP No. 15), 52–7, in Columbia, Missouri. The lopsided game was Illinois' first loss under new head coach Mike White. Missouri totaled 486 yards of total offense, including 105 rushing yards by running back James Wilder Sr.

=== Air Force ===
On September 27, Illinois and Air Force played to a 20–20 tie before a crowd of 45,638 at Memorial Stadium in Champaign. An inadvertent whistle saved the game for Illinois in the fourth quarter. With 6:12 left in the game and Illinois trailing, 20–17, Illinois quarterback fumbled into the arms of a defender, but the play was negated when officials ruled that the play should be replayed as the result of an "inadvertent" whistle blown during the play. Illinois then continued its drive which culminated in a Mike Bass field goal with 3:13 left in the game.

=== Mississippi State ===
On October 4, Illinois lost to Mississippi State, 28–21, before a crowd of 60,889 in Champaign. Illinois quarterback Dave Wilson set an Illinois single-game record with 23 completions and passed for 283 yards. Mississippi State scored its four touchdowns off two Illinois fumbles, an interception, and a blocked punt.

=== At Iowa ===
On October 11, Illinois defeated Iowa, 20–14, before a crowd of 59,780 at Kinnick Stadium in Iowa City. Illinois led, 20–0, early in the third quarter when Illinois cornerback Rick George returned a fumble 13 yards for a touchdown on the third play of the second half. Iowa then mounted a comeback that fell short. Keith Chappelle led the comeback effort, catching two touchdown passes in the second half. Chappelle broke an Iowa single-game record with 191 receiving yards and tied another with 11 receptions.

=== Purdue ===
On October 18, Purdue defeated Illinois, 45–20, before a crowd of 62,121 in Champaign. In a remarkable passing exhibition, the Big Ten single-game record for passing yardage was broken twice in the same game. Mark Herrmann broke the record first with 371 yards, surpassing the mark set two years earlier by Eddie Smith. Hermann went to the bench halfway through the fourth quarter, only to watch his record broken by Illinois quarterback Dave Wilson who tallied 425 passing yards as the Illini passed with abandon through the final minutes. Wilson also broke Big Ten single-game records with 58 passes and 35 completions.

=== At Michigan ===
On October 25, Michigan defeated Illinois, 45–14, before a homecoming crowd of 105,109 in Ann Arbor. The game had special significance, because Michigan assistant coaches Gary Moeller and Lloyd Carr had been fired by Illinois after the 1979 season. Rumors spread before the game that coach Schembechler wanted to "make Illinois pay" for the firings. Michigan back Stan Edwards and Lawrence Ricks rushed for 152 and 97 yards, respectively. Anthony Carter caught five passes for 121 yards and a touchdown in the first half. After the game, the Michigan players presented game balls to assistant coaches Moeller and Carr.

=== Minnesota ===
On November 1, Minnesota defeated Illinois, 21–18, before a homecoming crowd of 51,202 in Champaign. Illinois quarterback Dave Wilson completed 22 of 59 passes for 310 yards and two touchdowns. The game was marred by 12 fumbles and 22 penalties. Minnesota's running backs, Marion Barber, Jr. and Garry White rushed for 162 and 103 yards, respectively.

=== At Ohio State ===
On November 8, Ohio State (AP No. 7) narrowly defeated Illinois, 49–42, in Columbus. Illinois quarterback Dave Wilson set an NCAA single-season record with 621 passing yards. Art Schlichter threw four touchdown passes and broke the Ohio State career total yards record previously held by Archie Griffin.

=== At Indiana ===
On November 15, Indiana defeated Illinois, 26–24, in Bloomington. Indiana tailback Lonnie Johnson rushed for a school record 237 yards on 37 carries. Illinois quarterback Dave Wilson kept the game close as he passed for 403 yards and three touchdowns.

== Roster ==
1980 Illinois Fighting Illini football team roster
Players
Coaches
Offense

Pos.	#	Name	Class
OT	71	Lou Belmont	Jr
C	63	Greg Boeke	Sr
TE	80	Lee Boeke	Sr
RB	22	Terry Brooks	So
OT	74	Tom Coady	Sr
RB	21	Joe Curtis	Jr
QB		Tim Damron	So
WR	88	Cullen Daniel	So
OL	64	Tory Daugherty	So
WR	19	Greg Dentino	Sr
OT	78	Jim Eriandson	So
FB	29	Ron Ferrari	Sr
G	65	Marty Finis	So
C	55	Adam Lingner	So
QB	9	Tim McAvoy	Sr
G	62	Troy McMillin	Sr
OT	72	Tim Norman	Sr
WR	12	Kenny Shaw	Jr
FB	42	Calvin Thomas	Jr
QB	18	Dave Wilson	Sr
QB	14	Rich Weiss	Sr

Defense

Pos.	#	Name	Class
LB	37	Earnest Adams	Sr
OLB	84	Kelvin Atkins	Jr
OLB	31	Pete Burgard	Jr
DL	67	Scott Doney	Sr
DL	66	Kenny Durrell	Jr
DT	49	Dave Dwyer	Sr
DL	52	Dennis Flynn	Sr
DB	6	Rick George	Jr
LB	38	John Gillen	Sr
DL	87	Ken Gillen	Jr
LB	89	Dan MacLean	Sr
DT	93	Dan Shea	Jr
LB	34	Jack Squirek	Jr

Special teams

Pos.	#	Name	Class
K	8	Erik Klein	Jr
P	96	Chris Sigourney	So

Head coach

- Mike White

Coordinators/assistant coaches

- Brad Childress (running backs)

Legend

- (C) Team captain
- (S) Suspended
- (I) Ineligible
- Injured
- Redshirt

Roster
