= Scott Woolf =

American football player (born 1961)

No. 17
- Position: Quarterback

Personal information
- Born: December 26, 1961 (age 64); Salem, Ohio, U.S.
- Listed height: 6 ft 1 in (1.85 m)
- Listed weight: 190 lb (86 kg)

Career information
- High school: West Branch
- College: Mount Union
- NFL draft: 1986: undrafted

Career history
- Dallas Cowboys (1986)*; Los Angeles Raiders (1987)
- * Offseason or practice squad member only
- Stats at Pro Football Reference

Rodney Scott Woolf (born December 26, 1961) is an American former professional football player who was a quarterback for the Los Angeles Raiders of the National Football League (NFL). He played college football for the Mount Union Purple Raiders.
