= Chris Riehm =

American football player (1961–2012)

No. 77
- Positions: Guard, tackle

Personal information
- Born: April 14, 1961; Columbus, Ohio
- Died: March 11, 2012 (aged 50); Medina, Ohio
- Listed height: 6 ft 6 in (1.98 m)
- Listed weight: 275 lb (125 kg)

Career information
- High school: Medina (OH) Highland
- College: Ohio State

Career history
- Kansas City Chiefs (1983)*; Baltimore Colts (1983)*; Oakland Invaders (1984); Houston Gamblers (1985); Los Angeles Raiders (1986–1988)
- * Offseason or practice squad member only
- Stats at Pro Football Reference

Chris Riehm (April 14, 1961 – March 11, 2012) was an American football guard and tackle. He played for the Los Angeles Raiders from 1986 to 1988.

He died of a heart attack on March 11, 2012, in Medina, Ohio at age 50.
