= Harald Schuh =

Austrian politician (born 1974)

Member of the National Council
- Incumbent
- Assumed office 24 October 2024
- Constituency: Upper Austria

Personal details
- Born: 6 March 1974 (age 52)
- Party: Freedom Party

Harald Schuh (born 6 March 1974) is an Austrian politician of the Freedom Party serving as a member of the National Council since 2024. He has been a city councillor of Freistadt since 2020.
