= Julia Dannath-Schuh =

German psychologist (born 1977)

Julia Dannath-Schuh (born 16 May 1977) is a German psychologist. She is the Vice President for Personnel Development and Leadership at ETH Zurich since November 2020. Dannath-Schuh is the first person to hold this office, which was created alongside another new role as the Vice President for Knowledge Transfer and Corporate Relations in 2020, extending the Executive Board of ETH Zurich from five to seven members.

== Career ==
Dannath-Schuh has a scientific background within psychology and leadership. She received her psychology diploma at Saarland University, her doctorate at University of Tübingen, did further training as psychotherapist and received her EMBA from University of St. Gallen. Prior to joining ETH Zurich she worked as an organisational development consultant and was the CEO of consulting firm Manres AG.

As the Vice President for Personal Development and Leadership Dannath-Schuh is responsible for staff policy for technical, administrative and scientific staff, as well as for personnel development and management of all staff at the university. She supports the ETH Zurich President Joël Mesot in implementing staff policy for professors, and she is responsible for implementing and adhering to personnel regulations, ensuring equal opportunity and promoting diversity amongst ETH members. In addition to these duties, she is responsible for personnel management in the academic departments and the central administrative units, as well as providing support for staff recruiting and vocational training.

== Selected publications ==
- Gorbach A., Dannath-Schuh, J., Cusumano, F. (2019) Orientierung für Führungskräfte, Freiburg, Haufe Verlag.
- Johner, P. (2010), Transforming Leaders, Freiburg, Haufe Verlag. (Book chapter)
