= Dave Wilson (American football) =

American football player (born 1959)

No. 18
- Position: Quarterback

Personal information
- Born: April 27, 1959 (age 67); Anaheim, California, U.S.
- Listed height: 6 ft 3 in (1.91 m)
- Listed weight: 206 lb (93 kg)

Career information
- High school: Katella (Anaheim)
- College: Illinois
- Supplemental draft: 1981: 1st round

Career history
- New Orleans Saints (1981–1989)

Career NFL statistics
- Passing attempts: 1,039
- Passing completions: 551
- Completion percentage: 53.0%
- TD–INT: 36–55
- Passing yards: 6,987
- Passer rating: 63.8
- Stats at Pro Football Reference

David Carlton Wilson (born April 27, 1959) is an American former professional football player who was a quarterback with the New Orleans Saints of the National Football League (NFL) from 1981 to 1989. He played college football for the Illinois Fighting Illini and was selected by the Saints with the first selection of the 1981 supplemental draft.

== College career ==
Wilson attended Katella High School in Anaheim, California. He had a reputation for a strong arm and quick release, when he received a scholarship from the University of Illinois at Urbana–Champaign in the Big Ten Conference. Wilson had many issues with his NCAA eligibility due to some issues with his transcripts.

The highlight of Wilson's career was in 1980 against Ohio State on November 8, when he threw for 621 yards, an NCAA record that lasted eight years.

== Professional career ==
Once again, eligibility problems forced Wilson to declare himself eligible for the supplemental draft on July 7. The New Orleans Saints under new head coach Bum Phillips took him with the first pick of that years draft as the heir apparent to longtime starter Archie Manning.

Torn ligaments in his left knee incurred in a preseason game on August 12, 1982, required surgery and ended his year; it affected his mobility for the rest of his career. Wilson spent his entire career with the Saints, until his retirement prior to the 1990 season. Most of his playing time came during the 1985 and 1986 seasons, when he started ten and thirteen games, respectively.

== Later life and family ==
Wilson is currently a scout for NFL Pro Scouts in southern California. He has two sons, who both play football.
