= Dave McClain (American football) =

American football player and coach (1938–1986)

Biographical details
- Born: January 28, 1938; Upper Sandusky, Ohio, U.S.
- Died: April 28, 1986 (aged 48); Madison, Wisconsin, U.S.

Playing career
- 1959: Bowling Green
- Positions: Quarterback, safety

Coaching career (HC unless noted)
- 1960: Crestline HS (OH)
- 1961: Bowling Green (GA)
- 1962: Cornell (assistant)
- 1963–1966: Miami (OH) (assistant)
- 1967–1968: Kansas (assistant)
- 1969–1970: Ohio State (assistant)
- 1971–1977: Ball State
- 1978–1985: Wisconsin

Head coaching record
- Overall: 92–67–6 (college); 8–1 (high school)
- Bowls: 1–2

Accomplishments and honors

Championships
- 1 MAC (1976)

Awards
- MAC Coach of the Year (1975); Wisconsin Football Coaches Association (WFCA) Hall of Fame (inducted in 1992)

Dave McClain (January 28, 1938 – April 28, 1986) was an American football player and coach. He served as the head football coach at Ball State University from 1971 to 1977 and University of Wisconsin–Madison from 1978 to 1985, compiling a career college football record of 92–67–6.

== Playing career ==
A native of Upper Sandusky, Ohio, McClain was a 1956 graduate of Upper Sandusky High School and a 1960 graduate of Bowling Green State University, where he played both quarterback and safety. As a basketball player for Upper Sandusky, McClain held the career-scoring record from 1956 through 1982 with 1079 points.

== Coaching career ==
McClain started his coaching career at Crestline High School in Ohio with an 8–1 record and then returned to Bowling Green as a graduate assistant in 1961, where he served as freshmen offensive coach. He then served as an assistant coach at Cornell University under Tom Harp in 1962; at Miami University under Bo Schembechler, 1963–1966; at the University of Kansas under Pepper Rodgers, 1967–1968; and at Ohio State University under Woody Hayes in 1969–1970 before accepting the head coaching job at Ball State.

During his seven seasons at Ball State, McClain compiled a 46–25–3 (.642) record. During his tenure, Ball State joined Division I and the Mid-American Conference (MAC). He was the MAC Coach of the Year in 1975. The 1976, team captured the school's first MAC title in only its second year in the conference.

Following his successful run at Ball State, McClain was hired as the head football coach at Wisconsin, where he served from 1978 to 1985. During his tenure he compiled a 46–42–3 (.522) record, including a 1–2 record in post-season bowl games. He led the Badgers to back to back seven-win seasons in 1981 and 1982. McClain was the first coach in Badger football history to win the first four games of his head coaching tenure at Wisconsin. He also recorded Wisconsin football's first post-season bowl victory, a 14–3 win over the Kansas State Wildcats in the 1982 Independence Bowl.

== Death and honors ==
McClain's coaching career was cut short when he died on April 28, 1986, of cardiac arrest. He was 48 years of age.

Following his death, he was inducted into the Bowling Green State University Athletic Hall of Fame in 1986. He was inducted into the Ball State University Athletic Hall of Fame in 1990. Also, the Dave McClain Athletic Facility at the University of Wisconsin–Madison was named in his memory. In 1986, the Big Ten Conference dedicated its football Coach of the Year award in honor of McClain. In 2011, McClain was inducted into UW's Athletic Hall of Fame.

== Head coaching record ==
=== College ===
Year	Team	Overall	Conference	Standing	Bowl/playoffs
Ball State Cardinals (NCAA College Division / Division II independent) (1971–1974)
1971	Ball State	4–5–1			
1972	Ball State	5–4–1			
1973	Ball State	5–5–1			
1974	Ball State	6–4			
Ball State Cardinals (Mid-American Conference) (1975–1977)
1975	Ball State	9–2	4–2	T–3rd	
1976	Ball State	8–3	4–1	1st	
1977	Ball State	9–2	5–1	3rd	
Ball State:		46–25–3	13–4		
Wisconsin Badgers (Big Ten Conference) (1978–1985)
1978	Wisconsin	5–4–2	3–4–2	6th	
1979	Wisconsin	4–7	3–5	T–7th	
1980	Wisconsin	4–7	3–5	T–6th	
1981	Wisconsin	7–5	6–3	T–3rd	L Garden State
1982	Wisconsin	7–5	5–4	5th	W Independence
1983	Wisconsin	7–4	5–4	T–4th	
1984	Wisconsin	7–4–1	5–3–1	T–4th	L Hall of Fame Classic
1985	Wisconsin	5–6	2–6	8th	
Wisconsin:		46–42–3	32–34–3		
Total:		92–67–6			
National championship Conference title Conference division title or championship game berth
