= Jim Gallery =

American football player (born 1961)

No. 13, 18, 6
- Position: Placekicker

Personal information
- Born: September 15, 1961 (age 65); Redwood Falls, Minnesota, U.S.
- Listed height: 6 ft 1 in (1.85 m)
- Listed weight: 190 lb (86 kg)

Career information
- High school: Morton
- College: Minnesota
- NFL draft: 1984: 10th round, 254th overall pick

Career history
- Tampa Bay Buccaneers (1984)*; Buffalo Bills (1984–1985)*; New England Patriots (1987)*; St. Louis Cardinals (1987); Cincinnati Bengals (1989); Minnesota Vikings (1990); San Antonio Riders (1991–1992); Miami Dolphins (1992)*
- * Offseason or practice squad member only

Career NFL statistics
- Field goals: 11
- Field goal attempts: 25
- Field goal %: 44
- Longest field goal: 48
- Stats at Pro Football Reference

James Patrick Gallery (born September 15, 1961) is an American former professional football player who was a placekicker in the National Football League (NFL) who played for the St. Louis Cardinals, Cincinnati Bengals and Minnesota Vikings. He played college football for the Minnesota Golden Gophers.
