= John Leister =

American baseball player (born 1961)

- Pitcher
- Born: January 3, 1961 (age 65); San Antonio, Texas, U.S.
- Batted: Right Threw: Right

MLB debut
- May 28, 1987, for the Boston Red Sox

Last MLB appearance
- April 16, 1990, for the Boston Red Sox

MLB statistics
- Win–loss record: 0-2
- Earned run average: 8.50
- Strikeouts: 19
- Stats at Baseball Reference

Teams
- Boston Red Sox (1987, 1990)

John William Leister (born January 3, 1961) is a former starting pitcher in Major League Baseball who played for the Boston Red Sox. He has also been a baseball and football coach.

== Playing career ==
Listed at 6' 2", 200 lb., Leister batted and threw right-handed. Signed as a free agent in 1984 he was originally drafted by the New York Mets out of high school in Great Falls, Montana. Leister's baseball career was delayed as he accepted a football scholarship at Michigan State University in the fall of 1979.

At MSU he was the starting quarterback for three years and set multiple passing records that have since been surpassed. The terms of his football scholarship did not allow him to play baseball until the completion of his football eligibility. After pitching for the Spartans his senior year, he was drafted again in 1983 by the Oakland A's.

Instead Leister tried out as quarterback for the Pittsburgh Steelers, who later cut him at the end of training camp, opting to keep Terry Bradshaw, who had undergone an off-season elbow surgery, for his final season. It is said that he outbenched Bradshaw at a spring workout. Bradshaw played in only one game in the 1983, when he suffered a career-ending injury after only his eighth pass of the season. Leister also was drafted and was briefly a member of the Michigan Panthers of the United States Football League (USFL), but left the team to play professional baseball with the Red Sox.

He played five seasons in the minor leagues for Winter Haven (1984), New Britain (1985), Pawtucket (1987, 1988–1990), and two for the Red Sox (1987, 1990). In a two-season major league career, Leister posted a 0-2 record with 19 strikeouts and an 8.50 earned run average in 36.0 innings of work. Leister was known to his fans as "The Mullet Man".

== Coaching career ==
Following his professional career, Leister graduated from Michigan State University and began to coach at Alma College, an MIAA member located in Alma, Michigan. In 1994, he became Alma's assistant football and assistant baseball coach. In 1997, he became the head baseball coach for the Scots, and led the Scots to the 1999 MIAA title, their first league title since 1987. He served as the offensive coordinator for the Scots football team for many years before retiring from the position before the 2012 season. He led the offense to many record-breaking seasons after arriving at Alma, helping the Scots to three MIAA football championships (1999, 2002, 2004). Leister was most recently the athletic director at Alma College, a position he accepted in 2007 and resigned from in 2014.

After brief stints as football offensive coordinator and head varsity baseball coach at Chesaning Union High School (2016-17) and as Assistant Head Football Coach/Offensive Coordinator at Lindenwood University-Belleville (2017-18), Leister returned to Mid-Michigan to join the Central Michigan University football staff in 2019.

Leister has served in multiple areas for the Chippewas with roles as a coaching analyst, program relations and student-athlete engagement and his current role as Director of Football Operations.
