= Calvin Murray (American football) =

American football player (born 1958)

No. 42, 33
- Position: Running back

Personal information
- Born: October 18, 1958 (age 68); Middle Township, New Jersey, U.S.
- Listed height: 5 ft 11 in (1.80 m)
- Listed weight: 185 lb (84 kg)

Career information
- High school: Millville (Millville, New Jersey)
- College: Ohio State
- NFL draft: 1981: 4th round, 110th overall pick

Career history
- Philadelphia Eagles (1981–1982); Arizona Wranglers (1983); Denver Gold (1984)

Awards and highlights
- First-team All-Big Ten (1980)

Career NFL statistics
- Rushing yards: 134
- Average: 5.8
- Rushing touchdowns: 0
- Stats at Pro Football Reference

Leon Calvin (Yosef) Murray (born October 18, 1958) is an American former professional football player who was a running back in the National Football League (NFL). He was selected by the Philadelphia Eagles the National Football League (NFL) in the fourth round of the 1981 NFL draft and played from 1981 to 1982 for the Eagles. He also played in 1983 for the Arizona Wranglers and in 1984 for the Denver Gold of the United States Football League (USFL).

Born in Middle Township, New Jersey and raised in Woodbine, Murray attended Millville Senior High School. He played college football for the Ohio State Buckeyes.

== College career ==
In a game against Washington State on September 22, 1979, Murray set an Ohio State Buckeyes record for longest pass reception when he caught an 86-yard pass from Art Schlichter. Murray led the Buckeyes in rushing in 1979 and 1980. He led the Big Ten in rushing in 1980. He was voted as Ohio State's most valuable player by his teammates in 1980.

== Professional career ==
=== Philadelphia Eagles ===
Murray was selected by the Philadelphia Eagles in the fourth round of the 1981 NFL draft. He was released prior to the start of the 1981 season, but was re-signed on October 28 when Louie Giammona was knocked out for the remainder of the season with a knee injury. During the 1981 season he appeared in 7 games, in which he rushed 23 times for 134 yards, caught one pass for 7 yards, and returned one kickoff for 14 yards.

In 1982 he appeared in one game, returning three kickoffs for 42 yards.

=== Arizona Wranglers ===
In 1983, Murray signed with the Arizona Wranglers of the United States Football League and was the 12th highest rusher in the league that year with 699 rushing yards and four touchdowns. Murray also had 40 receptions and three receiving touchdowns.

=== Denver Gold ===
In 1984, Murray signed with the Denver Gold.

== Personal ==
Since retiring from football, Murray has resided in Columbus, Ohio. He spent several years as a purchasing manager for Franklin University in downtown Columbus.

Murray's son, Cal, is a former running back for the Miami RedHawks. He was drafted by Rhein Fire in the 22nd round of the 2007 NFL Europa Free Agent Draft.

Murray converted to Orthodox Judaism and adopted the Hebrew name Yosef. He immigrated to Israel and lives in the settlement Ma'ale Adumim.

Preceded by Jim Laughlin	Ohio State Buckeyes; Football Season MVP; 1980	Succeeded by Art Schlichter
Preceded by Ron Springs	Ohio State Buckeyes; Starting Tailbacks; 1979-1980	Succeeded by Tim Spencer
