= Jeff Schuh =

American football player (born 1958)

No. 59, 53, 54
- Position: Linebacker

Personal information
- Born: May 22, 1958 (age 68); Crystal, Minnesota, U.S.
- Listed height: 6 ft 2 in (1.88 m)
- Listed weight: 228 lb (103 kg)

Career information
- High school: Robbinsdale Armstong (Plymouth, Minnesota)
- College: Minnesota
- NFL draft: 1981: 7th round, 176th overall pick

Career history
- Cincinnati Bengals (1981–1985); Minnesota Vikings (1986); Green Bay Packers (1986)

Awards and highlights
- First-team All-Big Ten (1980)

Career NFL statistics
- Sacks: 6
- Interceptions: 1
- Fumble recoveries: 2
- Stats at Pro Football Reference

Jeffrey Schuh (born May 22, 1958) is an American former professional football linebacker in the National Football League (NFL).

Schuh was selected 176th overall by the Cincinnati Bengals in the seventh round of the 1981 NFL draft and spent five seasons with the team. He would split his final season between the Green Bay Packers and the Minnesota Vikings.

He played at the collegiate level at the University of Minnesota.
