= 1980 Big Ten Conference football season =

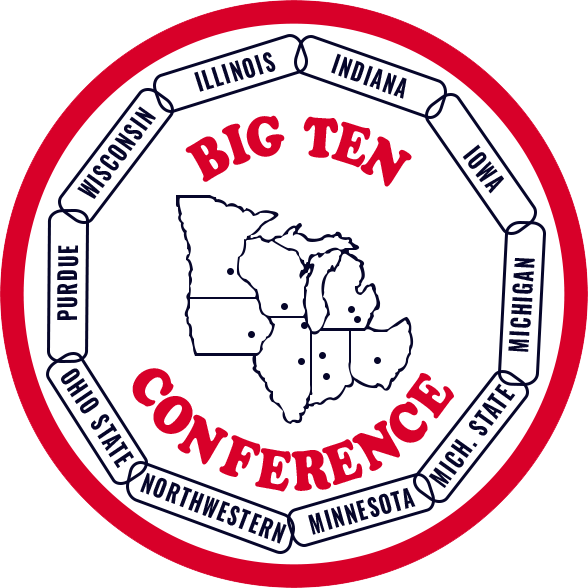
- League: NCAA Division I-A
- Sport: Football
- Teams: 10
- Top draft pick: Mel Owens
- Champion: Michigan
- Runners-up: Ohio State, Purdue
- Season MVP: Mark Herrmann
- Top scorer: Vlade Janakievski

Football seasons
- 1979 1981

1980 Big Ten Conference football standings
	Conf.					Overall
Team	W		L		T	W		L		T
No. 4 Michigan $	8	–	0	–	0	10	–	2	–	0
No. 15 Ohio State	7	–	1	–	0	9	–	3	–	0
No. 17 Purdue	7	–	1	–	0	9	–	3	–	0
Iowa	4	–	4	–	0	4	–	7	–	0
Minnesota	4	–	5	–	0	5	–	6	–	0
Indiana	3	–	5	–	0	6	–	5	–	0
Wisconsin	3	–	5	–	0	4	–	7	–	0
Illinois	3	–	5	–	0	3	–	7	–	1
Michigan State	2	–	6	–	0	3	–	8	–	0
Northwestern	0	–	9	–	0	0	–	11	–	0
$ – Conference champion; Rankings from AP Poll

The 1980 Big Ten Conference football season was the 85th season of college football played by the member schools of the Big Ten Conference and was a part of the 1980 NCAA Division I-A football season.

The 1980 Big Ten champion was Michigan. The Wolverines lost two of their first three games but went undefeated thereafter, culminating in a 23–6 victory over the Washington Huskies in the 1981 Rose Bowl (the program's first bowl victory under head coach Bo Schembechler). Michigan was ranked No. 4 in the final AP Poll, led the Big Ten in scoring defense (10.8 points per game), and did not allow a touchdown in the final 22 quarters of the season. Schembechler was selected as the Big Ten Coach of the Year.

The Ohio State Buckeyes started the season ranked No. 1 in the AP Poll, but finished the season ranked No. 15 after compiling a 9–3 record and losing to Penn State in the 1980 Fiesta Bowl. The Buckeyes led the conference in scoring offense with 32.3 points per game.

The Purdue Boilermakers finished the season tied with Ohio State for second place in the conference and were ranked No. 17 in the final AP Poll. During the 1980 season, Purdue quarterback Mark Herrmann became the first player in college football history to compile more than 9,000 career passing yards. Hermann also won the Chicago Tribune Silver Football as the most valuable player in the conference.

Mark Herrmann and Purdue teammate Dave Young, a tight end, were the only two Big Ten players to be recognized as consensus first-team players on the 1980 College Football All-America Team. The conference's statistical leaders included Hermann with 3,212 passing yards, Ohio State's Calvin Murray with 1,267 rushing yards, and Ohio State placekicker Vlade Janakievski with 90 points scored. Michigan linebacker Mel Owens was the only Big Ten player selected in the first round of the 1981 NFL draft, going to the Los Angeles Rams with the ninth pick.

== Season overview ==
=== Results and team statistics ===
Conf. Rank	Team	Head coach	AP final	AP high	Overall record	Conf. record	PPG	PAG
1	Michigan	Bo Schembechler	#4	#4	10–2	8–0	26.8	10.8
2 (tie)	Ohio State	Earle Bruce	#15	#1	9–3	7–1	32.3	15.1
2 (tie)	Purdue	Jim Young	#17	#9	9–3	7–1	27.3	19.4
4	Iowa	Hayden Fry	NR	NR	4–7	4–4	14.0	21.6
5	Minnesota	Joe Salem	NR	NR	5–6	4–5	19.1	22.7
6 (tie)	Indiana	Lee Corso	NR	NR	6–5	3–5	23.2	21.4
6 (tie)	Wisconsin	Dave McClain	NR	NR	4–7	3–5	12.5	19.2
6 (tie)	Illinois	Mike White	NR	NR	3–7–1	3–5	21.9	29.6
9	Michigan State	Muddy Waters	NR	NR	3–8	2–6	20.1	25.4
10	Northwestern	Rick Venturi	NR	NR	0–11	0–9	13.7	40.4

Key
AP final = Team's rank in the final AP Poll of the 1980 season
AP high = Team's highest rank in the AP Poll throughout the 1980 season
PPG = Average of points scored per game
PAG = Average of points allowed per game

=== Pre-season ===
Led by quarterback and Heisman Trophy candidate Art Schlichter, Ohio State came into the 1980 season as the defending Big Ten champion, having finished the 1979 season with an 11–1 record and ranked No. 4 in the final AP Poll. The 1980 season began with three Big Ten teams ranked in the pre-season AP Poll: Ohio State at No. 1; Purdue at No. 9; and Michigan at No. 12.

Two of the conference's teams hired new head coaches prior to the 1980 season.

- In December 1979, Illinois hired Mike White to replace Gary Moeller. Moeller's teams had gone 3–16–3 in the prior two seasons. White had been an assistant coach with the San Francisco 49ers in 1978 and 1979 and was the head coach for the California Golden Bears from 1972 to 1977.
- In January 1980, Michigan State hired Muddy Waters after Darryl Rogers resigned to take over as Arizona State's head coach. Waters had played for Michigan State from 1946 to 1949 and had been a head coach at Hillsdale College (1954–1973) and Saginaw Valley State (1975–1979).

=== Regular season ===
==== September 6 ====
On September 6, 1980, only three Big Ten teams played games.

Illinois 35, Northwestern 9. In the first conference game of the season, Illinois defeated Northwestern, 35–9, at Memorial Stadium in Champaign, Illinois. It was Illinois' first game under new head coach Mike White and its first victory at Memorial Stadium since October 1977.

Notre Dame 31, Purdue 10. In non-conference play, Purdue (AP No. 9) opened its season with a 31–10 loss to Notre Dame (AP No. 11) at Notre Dame Stadium. Purdue quarterback Mark Herrmann was sidelined with a bruised thumb and did not play. Phil Carter rushed for 142 yards for Notre Dame. After the game, the Boilermakers fell to No. 11 in the AP Poll.

==== September 13 ====
On September 13, 1980, eight of the 10 conference teams met in four conference games. Ohio State and Minnesota won against non-conference opponents.

Ohio State 31, Syracuse 21. Ohio State (AP No. 1) opened its season with a 31–21 victory over Syracuse at Ohio Stadium in Columbus. Despite being a 27-point underdog, Syracuse led, 21–9, at halftime. Ohio State's quarterback and Heisman Trophy candidate, Art Schlichter, threw two interceptions in the first half, and then led the Buckeyes to a 22-point comeback in the second half. After the close game with Syracuse, Ohio State dropped to No. 2 in the AP Poll as Alabama took over the No. 1 spot.

Michigan 17, Northwestern 10. Michigan (AP No. 11) also opened its season with an unexpectedly close game, defeating Northwestern, 17–10, at Michigan Stadium. Playing in a steady rain, the Wolverines struggled, and Michigan fans booed quarterback Rich Hewlett at the start of the second half. Anthony Carter had a 17-yard touchdown reception to give Michigan the win. After the game, Michigan dropped to No. 14 in the AP Poll.

Purdue 12, Wisconsin 6. Purdue (AP No. 20) defeated Wisconsin, 12–6. Purdue quarterback Mark Herrmann passed for 347 yards, including 200 yards to wide receiver Bart Burrell, but the Boilermakers were unable to score a touchdown, settling for four field goals. After the game, Purdue dropped out of the top 25.

Illinois 20, Michigan State 17. Illinois defeated Michigan State, 20–17, to spoil Muddy Waters debut as the Spartans' head coach. Mike Bass kicked the game-winning field goal as time ran out.

Iowa 16, Indiana 7. Iowa defeated Indiana, 16–7, at Memorial Stadium in Bloomington, Indiana. Jeff Brown rushed for 176 yards and caught five passes in his first start as Iowa's tailback.

Minnesota 38, Ohio 14. Minnesota defeated the Ohio Bobcats, 38–14, at Memorial Stadium in Minneapolis. Freshman quarterback Tim Salem, the son of Minnesota head coach Joe Salem, passed for 162 yards in his college debut. Marion Barber, Jr. also rushed for 127 yards, and Garry White scored three touchdowns to lead the Golden Gophers.

==== September 20 ====
On September 20, Minnesota and Ohio State met in conference play. In other games, Big Ten teams went 1–7 against non-conference opponents.

Ohio State 47, Minnesota 0. In its first game against a Big Ten opponent, Ohio State (AP No. 2) easily defeated Minnesota, 47–0, before the largest crowd (87,916) in Ohio Stadium history. Ohio State led, 33–0, at halftime in the one-sided contest. Minnesota running back Garry White fumbled twice, and quarterback Tim Salem threw three interceptions to help the Buckeyes' cause. After the game, Ohio State remained ranked No. 2 in the AP Poll.

Notre Dame 29, Michigan 27. Michigan (AP No. 14) lost to Notre Dame (AP No. 8), 29–27, in South Bend. With one minute left in the game, Notre Dame led, 26–21. Michigan's Craig Dunaway caught a deflected pass for a touchdown with 41 seconds remaining to put Michigan ahead. Michigan unsuccessfully tried for a two-point conversion, and Notre Dame took over on its 20-yard line. The Irish quickly drove into Michigan territory, and Notre Dame placekicker Harry Oliver then kicked a 51-yard field into a strong wind on the last play of the game. After the game, Michigan dropped to No. 17 in the AP Poll.

UCLA 23, Purdue 14. Purdue lost to UCLA, 23–14, in West Lafayette. Mark Herrmann passed for 282 yards, and his two touchdown passes gave him the Big Ten career record with 50 touchdown passes. Hermann also threw two interceptions in the defeat. The loss broke a 12-game winning streak for Purdue at Ross–Ade Stadium.

Indiana 36, Kentucky 30. In the annual Bourbon Barrel rivalry game, Indiana defeated Kentucky, 36–30, at Lexington, Kentucky. The game was tied at 30–30 when Indiana intercepted a Kentucky pass at midfield with 1:01 remaining in the game. Indiana took the lead on a touchdown pass to Steve Corso (the son of Indiana head coach Lee Corso); Corso called the play the "old pine tree slant".

Missouri 52, Illinois 7. In the Illinois–Missouri football rivalry, Illinois lost to Missouri (AP No. 15), 52–7, in Columbia, Missouri. The lopsided game was Illinois' first loss under new head coach Mike White. Missouri totaled 486 yards of total offense, including 105 rushing yards by running back James Wilder Sr.

Nebraska 57, Iowa 0. In the Iowa–Nebraska football rivalry, Iowa was "humiliated" by Nebraska (AP No. 6) by a 57–0 score in front of a crowd of 76,029 in Lincoln, Nebraska. The 57-point loss was the worst football defeat for Iowa in 30 years. Nebraska's Jarvis Redwine rushed for 153 yards on 12 carries.

Oregon 35, Michigan State 7. Michigan State lost to Oregon, 35–7, at Autzen Stadium in Eugene. After the game, Michigan State coach Muddy Waters said, "They just beat our face off."

BYU 28, Wisconsin 7. Wisconsin lost to BYU, 28–3, in Madison. BYU's Jim McMahon, winner of the 1981 Davey O'Brien Award and Sammy Baugh Trophy, passed for 337 yards and three touchdowns and ran for a fourth touchdown.

Washington 45, Northwestern 7. Northwestern lost to Washington (AP No. 16), 45–7, in Seattle. Washington's Toussaint Tyler rushed for 83 yards and scored three touchdowns.

==== September 27 ====
Nine Big Ten teams played non-conference games on September 27, 1980, compiling a 3–5–1 on the day. Purdue had a bye week.

Ohio State 38, Arizona State 21. Ohio State (AP No. 2) defeated Arizona State (AP No. 20), 38–21, before a crowd of 88,097 at Ohio Stadium in Columbus, Ohio. Art Schlichter accounted for 310 yards of total offense, including 271 passing yards and three touchdown passes. Doug Donley caught six passes for 133 yard and two touchdowns. Ohio State totaled 591 yards of total offense, and Arizona State had 440 yards.

South Carolina 17, Michigan 14. Michigan lost it second consecutive game, falling to South Carolina, 17–14, at Michigan Stadium. 1980 Heisman Trophy winner George Rogers rushed for 142 yards. After the game, Michigan dropped out of the AP Poll's top 25.

Indiana 49, Colorado 7. Indiana defeated Colorado, 49–7, before a crowd of 40,219 at Folsom Field in Boulder, Colorado. Flanker Nate Lundy shattered Indiana's single game receiving record (previously 178 yards) with five catches for 256 yards and three touchdowns. After the game, coach Lee Corso said: "Nate Lundy had a great game. 'Doctor Deep' can run on anyone." Quarterback Tim Clifford also tied the school's single game passing yardage record (set in 1943 by Robert Hoernschemeyer), completing 11 of 14 passes for 345 yards and five touchdowns. Clifford also broke the school's career record with 262 completions. Mike Harkrader also became the school's career rushing leader with 2,791 yards.

USC 24, Minnesota 7. Minnesota lost to USC (AP No. 5), 24–7, in Minneapolis. The game drew a crowd of 55,115, the largest to attend a Minnesota football game in seven years. 1981 Heisman Trophy winner Marcus Allen rushed for 216 yards on 42 carries and scored two touchdowns for USC.

UCLA 35, Wisconsin 7. Wisconsin lost to UCLA (AP No. 16), 35–7, at the Rose Bowl in Pasadena. UCLA's freshman running back Kevin Nelson rushed for 123 yards and a touchdown on 20 carries and also caught three passes for 36 yards. John Williams rushed for 101 yards for Wisconsin, but the Badgers were unable to score.

Iowa State 10, Iowa 7. In the fourth modern edition of Iowa–Iowa State football rivalry, a game dubbed "Sic Em IV", Iowa lost to Iowa State, 10–7, before a crowd of 60,145 at Kinnick Stadium in Iowa City. Iowa quarterback Phil Suess threw a 20-yard touchdown pass in the second quarter, but he was unavailable to play in the second half after sustaining a sprained shoulder on his throwing arm. With less than a minute to go, Iowa drove to Iowa State's nine-yard line, but opted to go for the win rather than kick a game-tying field goal.

Michigan State 33, Western Michigan 7. Michigan State defeated Western Michigan, 33–7, before a crowd of 75,12 at Spartan Stadium in East Lansing. The victory was the first of the Muddy Waters era at Michigan State. The Spartans were assisted by five Western Michigan fumbles and two interceptions. The Spartans scored three touchdowns off Western Michigan turnovers. Michigan State tailback Tony Ellis scored three touchdowns. Morten Andersen kicked two field goals for the Spartans.

Illinois 20, Air Force 20. Illinois and Air Force played to a 20–20 tie before a crowd of 45,638 at Memorial Stadium in Champaign. An inadvertent whistle saved the game for Illinois in the fourth quarter. With 6:12 left in the game and Illinois trailing, 20-17, Illinois quarterback fumbled into the arms of a defender, but the play was negated when officials ruled that the play should be replayed as the result of an "inadvertent" whistle blown during the play. Illinois then continued its drive which culminated in a Mike Bass field goal with 3:13 left in the game.

Syracuse 42, Northwestern 21. Northwestern lost to Syracuse, 42–21, before a crowd of 34,738 at the Carrier Dome in Syracuse. Northwestern quarterback Mike Kerrigan set a single-game Northwestern record with 25 completions, passing for 269 yards and three touchdowns. Joe Morris rushed for 172 yards for Syracuse. The game was marred by oranges being repeatedly thrown on the field by students, resulting in two 15-yard penalties and caused Syracuse's quarterback to slip on a peel at the Northwestern one-yard line. Syracuse coach Frank Maloney called the students' conduct both "sinful" and "bush league".

==== October 4 ====
Minnesota 49, Northwestern 21. On October 4, 1980, the week's only conference game matched Minnesota against Northwestern at Dyche Stadium (Evanston, IL). Minnesota won, 49–21, led by running backs Marion Barber, Jr. (118 rushing yards, three touchdowns) and Garry White (129 rushing yards, two touchdowns).

The other eight conference team played non-conference opponents.

UCLA 17, Ohio State 0. Ohio State (AP No. 2) was shut out by UCLA (AP No. 11), 17–0. UCLA held Ohio State scoreless for the first time in the Buckeyes' last 25 games. Ohio State fell to No. 9 in the following week's AP Poll.

Michigan 38, California 13. Michigan bounced back from consecutive losses with a 38–13 victory over California. Cal was led by All-American quarterback Rich Campbell who passed for 249 yards. Michigan totaled 388 rushing yards, including 184 yards by Lawrence Ricks and 127 yards by Stan Edwards.

Purdue 28, Miami (OH) 3. Purdue defeated Miami (OH), 28–3, as Mark Herrmann passed for 291 yards and three touchdowns.

Notre Dame 26, Michigan State 21. Michigan State lost to No. 7 Notre Dame, 26–21. Notre Dame running back Phil Carter rushed for 254 yards in the game.

Indiana 31, Duke 21. Indiana defeated Duke, 31–21, before a crowd of 43,120 in Bloomington. Running back Lonnie Johnson tied Indiana's single game rushing record (set by Courtney Snyder in 1974) with 211 rushing yards against Duke. After the game, coach Lee Corso called Johnson "the best all-around back in the Big Ten."

Wisconsin 35, San Diego State 12. Wisconsin defeated San Diego State, 35–12, in Madison. After failing to score a touchdown in its first three games, Wisconsin took a 21–0 lead over San Diego State in the second quarter. Defensive end Dave Ahrens had three sacks, and the Aztecs were held to minus four net rushing yards.

Arizona 5, Iowa 3. Iowa lost to Arizona, 5–3, before a crowd of 59,950 at Kinnick Stadium in Iowa City. After fans booed the Hawkeyes during the game, Iowa coach Hayden Fry noted that "Iowa fans have more experience at booing than anybody else in the country." Iowa's only points came on a Reggie Roby field goal in the fourth quarter. Roby then missed a 48-yard attempt with 2:28 remaining in the game. Iowa also gave up two points on a safety when Arizona blocked a punt out of the end zone.

Mississippi State 28, Illinois 21. Illinois lost to Mississippi State, 28–21, before a crowd of 60,889 in Champaign. Illinois quarterback Dave Wilson set an Illinois single-game record with 23 completions and passed for 283 yards. Mississippi State scored its four touchdowns off two Illinois fumbles, an interception, and a blocked punt.

==== October 11 ====
On October 11, 1980, all 10 member schools faced off in five conference games.

Ohio State 63, Northwestern 0. Ohio State defeated Northwestern, 63–0, before a homecoming crowd of 29,375 at Dyche Stadium in Evanston. Ohio State led, 42-0, at halftime. Ohio State had 575 total yards, including 418 rushing yards. Calvin Murray had 120 yards and three touchdowns on nine carries. The night before the game, Northwestern coach was served with a lawsuit filed by 22 African American players alleging racial discrimination.

Michigan 27, Michigan State 23. In the annual Michigan–Michigan State football rivalry game, Michigan defeated Michigan State, 27-23, before a crowd of 105,263 at Michigan Stadium in Ann Arbor. Michigan took an early 10-0 lead, but Michigan State rallied back, aided by three Morten Andersen field goals, including a 57-yard conversion that set a Michigan State record. In the third quarter, with the score tied 13-13, Michigan State was penalized for roughing the kicker on a field goal attempt The penalty gave Michigan a first down at the nine-yard line, and three plays later John Wangler threw a touchdown pass to Anthony Carter. Stan Edwards rushed for 139 yards for Michigan. Michigan scored its final touchdown on a pass from Wangler to Craig Dunaway. Michigan intercepted a pass in the final minute-and-a-half of the game to stop the Spartans' final drive.

Purdue 21, Minnesota 7. Purdue defeated Minnesota, 21–7, in West Lafayette. In the first half, Purdue took a 21-0 lead, as Mark Herrmann completed 14 of 19 passes for 163 yards and two touchdowns. Purdue was shut out in the second half, and Hermann had only 28 passing yards in the second half, but Purdue's 21 points in the first half were enough for the victory.

Indiana 24, Wisconsin 0. Indiana defeated Wisconsin, 24–0, in front of a homecoming crowd of 51,029 at Memorial Stadium in Bloomington. Indiana's defense held Wisconsin to 204 yards of total offense (only 65 in the second half) and had seven tackles for loss. Quarterback Tim Clifford completed 17 of 25 passes for 186 yards and two touchdowns.

Illinois 20, Iowa 14. Illinois defeated Iowa, 20–14, before a crowd of 59,780 at Kinnick Stadium in Iowa City. Illinois led, 20-0, early in the third quarter when Illinois cornerback Rick George returned a fumble 13 yards for a touchdown on the third play of the second half. Iowa then mounted a comeback that fell short. Keith Chappelle led the comeback effort, catching two touchdown passes in the second half. Chappelle broke an Iowa single-game record with 191 receiving yards and tied another with 11 receptions.

==== October 18 ====
On October 18, 1980, all 10 member schools again faced off in five conference games.

Ohio State 27, Indiana 17. Ohio State (AP No. 9) defeated Indiana, 27–17, in Columbus. Ohio State running back Calvin Murray rushed for 224 yards, the fourth highest single-game tally in Ohio State history to that time, on 35 carries and scored two touchdowns on his 22nd birthday. Mike Harkrader rushed for 117 yards on 18 carries for the Hoosiers. Harkrader became the seventh leading rusher in Big Ten history with 3,034 yards.

Michigan 37, Minnesota 14. In the annual Little Brown Jug game, Michigan defeated Minnesota, 37-14, in front of a crowd of 56,298 at Memorial Stadium in Minneapolis. Minnesota held Michigan to 202 rushing yards, but quarterback John Wangler completed 16 of 22 passes for a personal-high 227 yards, and Anthony Carter caught nine passes for 142 yards and two touchdowns. Ali Haji-Sheikh added three field goals.

Purdue 45, Illinois 20. Purdue defeated Illinois, 45–20, before a crowd of 62,121 at Memorial Stadium in Champaign. In a remarkable passing exhibition, the Big Ten single-game record for passing yardage was broken twice in the same game. Mark Herrmann broke the record first with 371 yards, surpassing the mark set two years earlier by Eddie Smith. Hermann went to the bench halfway through the fourth quarter, only to watch his record broken by Illinois quarterback Dave Wilson who tallied 425 passing yards as the Illini passed with abandon through the final minutes. Wilson also broke Big Ten single-game records with 58 passes and 35 completions.

Wisconsin 17, Michigan State 7. Wisconsin defeated Michigan State, 17–7, at Spartan Stadium in East Lansing. Wisconsin fullback Dave Mohapp rushed for 138 yards and scored a touchdown. Wisconsin's second touchdown followed a fumbled punt that was recovered in the end zone by Mark Subach.

Iowa 25, Northwestern 3. Iowa defeated Northwestern, 25–3, before a homecoming crowd of 59,990 in Iowa City. In his first game as Iowa's starting tailback, Phil Blatcher rushed for 148 yards on 19 carries, including a 51-yard gain on a Statue of Liberty play, and also caught a touchdown pass.

==== October 25 ====
On October 25, 1980, the Big 10 teams faced off in five conference matchups.

Ohio State 21, Wisconsin 0. Ohio State (AP No. 10) defeated Wisconsin, 21–0, in Madison. Wisconsin's defense held Art Schlichter to 89 passing yards, but Ohio State scored touchdowns after two Wisconsin fumbles and an interception. After the game, Wisconsin coach Dave McClain said, "You can't make that many mistakes. I've never been so frustrated with the mistakes."

Michigan 45, Illinois 14. Michigan defeated Illinois, 45–14, before a homecoming crowd of 105,109 in Ann Arbor. The game had special significance, because Michigan assistant coaches Gary Moeller and Lloyd Carr had been fired by Illinois after the 1979 season. Rumors spread before the game that coach Schembechler wanted to "make Illinois pay" for the firings. Michigan back Stan Edwards and Lawrence Ricks rushed for 152 and 97 yards, respectively. Anthony Carter caught five passes for 121 yards and a touchdown in the first half. After the game, the Michigan players presented game balls to assistant coaches Moeller and Carr.

Purdue 36, Michigan State 25. Purdue defeated Michigan State, 36–25, in West Lafayette. Purdue quarterback completed 24 of 46 passes for 340 yards to break the NCAA career record for passing yardage. Hermann passed the prior record of 7,747 yards set by Jack Thompson from 1976 to 1978. Michigan State quarterback John Leister threw more passes (54) than Hermann, but completed only 18, had five interceptions, and lost a fumble. After the game, Michigan State coach Muddy Waters said, "John is pretty disgusted with himself."

Minnesota 24, Iowa 6. In the annual battle for the Floyd of Rosedale trophy, Minnesota defeated Iowa, 24–6, before a crowd of 58,158 in Minneapolis. Iowa fumbled eight times, gave up eight sacks, and managed to score only two field goals. Marion Barber, Jr. scored three rushing touchdowns for Minnesota.

Indiana 35, Northwestern 20. Indiana defeated Northwestern, 35–20, in Evanston. Lonnie Johnson rushed for 160 yards on 22 carries, and Mike Harkrader added 102 rushing yards.

==== November 1 ====
On November 1, 1980, the Big 10 teams faced off in five conference matchups.

Ohio State 48, Michigan State 16. Ohio State (AP No. 9) defeated Michigan State, 48–16, in front of a crowd of 77,153 persons at Spartan Stadium in East Lansing. Ohio State tallied 603 total yards in the game, and the Buckeyes' 48 points was the most allowed by Michigan State since 1976.

Michigan 35, Indiana 0. Michigan (AP No. 18) defeated Indiana, 35–0, in Bloomington. Michigan totaled 349 rushing yards, including 152 by Butch Woolfolk and 123 by Lawrence Ricks. Ricks scored two touchdowns in a span of 28 seconds, running 29 yards for the first, then scoring again after Indiana fumbled the ensuing kickoff. Anthony Carter caught a 34-yard touchdown pass from Wangler, and Woolfolk added a 64-yard touchdown run in the fourth quarter. Michigan also intercepted four passes thrown by 1979 Big Ten MVP, Tim Clifford.

Purdue 52, Northwestern 31. Purdue (AP No. 20) defeated Northwestern, 52–31, before a crowd of 17,744 persons at Dyche Stadium in Evanston. Purdue's 52 points was its highest scoring output in a game since 1947. Purdue running back rushed for 190 yards and scored four touchdown. Mark Herrmann passed for 210 yards and three touchdowns. Hermann also set the all-time record for career pass completions (651) and interceptions (69).

Iowa 22, Wisconsin 13. Iowa defeated Wisconsin, 22–13, in Iowa City. In his first game as Iowa's starting quarterback, Pete Gales completed nine of 22 passes for 161 yards and rushed for 41 yards. One of Gales' completions was good for 54 yards and a touchdown to Keith Chappelle. Iowa scored another touchdown when Iowa linebacker Andre Tippett forced a fumble by Wisconsin quarterback John Josten, and Mark Bortz recovered the ball in the end zone.

Minnesota 21, Illinois 18. Minnesota defeated Illinois, 21–18, before a homecoming crowd of 51,202 at Memorial Stadium in Champaign. Illinois quarterback Dave Wilson completed 22 of 59 passes for 310 yards and two touchdowns. The game was marred by 12 fumbles and 22 penalties. Minnesota's running backs, Marion Barber, Jr. and Garry White rushed for 162 and 103 yards, respectively.

==== November 8 ====
On November 8, 1980, the Big 10 teams faced off in five conference matchups.

Ohio State 49, Illinois 42. Ohio State (AP No. 7) narrowly defeated Illinois, 49–42, in Columbus. Illinois quarterback Dave Wilson set an NCAA single-season record with 621 passing yards. Art Schlichter threw four touchdown passes and broke the Ohio State career total yards record previously held by Archie Griffin.

Michigan 24, Wisconsin 0. Michigan (AP No. 12) shut out Wisconsin, 24–0, in Madison. Michigan struggled early, failing to earn a first down on its first six possessions. Anthony Carter caught a touchdown pass just before halftime to set a Michigan school record for touchdown receptions in a single season. As Michigan drove deep into Wisconsin territory, noise from the Wisconsin student section made it difficult for Michigan to call its signals. When fans refused to reduce the noise, the officials struck all three Wisconsin timeouts and then assessed two delay of game penalties, giving Michigan a first down at the one-yard line. Butch Woolfolk then scored on a one-yard run

Purdue 58, Iowa 13. Purdue (AP No. 17) defeated Iowa, 58–13, at Ross–Ade Stadium in West Lafayette. Mark Herrmann set a Purdue single-game record with 439 passing yards. Hermann also set an NCAA career record with 1,151 pass completions.

Minnesota 31, Indiana 7. Minnesota defeated Indiana, 31–7, in Minneapolis. Indiana quarterback Tim Clifford was knocked out of the game in the first half by "a savage blindside tackle" by Jeff Schuh. Minnesota running back Garry White rushed for 145 yards and two touchdowns.

Michigan State 42, Northwestern 10. Michigan State defeated Northwestern, 42–10, before a crowd of 60,157 at Spartan Stadium in East Lansing. Michigan State tailback Steve Smith rushed for 229 yards and a school record with four touchdowns. The Spartans totaled 571 yards of total offense.

==== November 15 ====
On November 15, 1980, the Big 10 teams faced off in five conference matchups.

Michigan 26, Purdue 0. Michigan defeated Purdue, 26–0, for Michigan's third consecutive shut out. The victory was particularly impressive as the Wolverines held Purdue's record-setting quarterback, Mark Herrmann, to 129 passing yard (24 in the second half), intercepted four of Hermann's passes, and did not allow a first down by Purdue in the second half. Coach Schembechler credited Michigan defensive coordinator Bill McCartney with the strategy of playing six defensive backs that held Purdue's offense scoreless.

Ohio State 41, Iowa 7. Ohio State easily defeated Iowa, 41–7, in Iowa City. Art Schlichter threw two touchdown passes, and Calvin Murray rushed for 183 yards to lead the Buckeyes.

Indiana 26, Illinois 24. Indiana defeated Illinois, 26–24, in Bloomington. Indiana tailback Lonnie Johnson rushed for a school record 237 yards on 37 carries. Illinois quarterback Dave Wilson kept the game close as he passed for 403 yards and three touchdowns.

Michigan State 30, Minnesota 12. Michigan State defeated Minnesota, 30–12, before a crowd of 30,329 in Minneapolis. Michigan State quarterback John Leister passed for 209 yards and three touchdowns. Minnesota quarterback Tim Salem completed only 5 of 15 passes, threw two interceptions, and fumbled twice.

Wisconsin 39, Northwestern 19. Wisconsin defeated Northwestern, 39–19, in Evanston. Northwestern's Mike Kerrigan passed for 237 yards in the loss. The Wildcats finished the season 0–11 and in the midst of a 34-game losing streak that began on September 22, 1979, and ended on September 25, 1982.

==== November 22 ====
On November 22, 1980, the Big Ten regular season came to an end with four games being played. Illinois and Northwestern were idle, having concluded their schedules one week earlier.

Michigan 9, Ohio State 3. Ohio State (AP No. 5) and Michigan (AP No. 10) met in their annual rivalry game to determine the Big Ten championship. The game was played before a record crowd of 88,827 fans at Ohio Stadium and matched the conference's top scoring offense (Ohio State) against the top scoring defense (Michigan). Michigan prevailed, defeating the Buckeyes by a 9–3 score. Michigan's only touchdown came late in the third quarter on a pass from John Wangler to Anthony Carter. Ali Haji-Sheikh missed the extra point and also missed two field goal attempts. Big Ten rushing leader Calvin Murray was held to 38 yards on 14 carries. Ohio State had a chance to win late in the fourth quarter, as Art Schlichter completed a 28-yard pass to the Michigan 32-yard line with less than a minute to play. Schlichter was penalized for intentional grounding and was sacked on the next play with 13 seconds left on the clock. Michigan extended its streak of not having allowed a touchdown to 18 quarters and 274 minutes.

Purdue 24, Indiana 23. In the annual battle for the Old Oaken Bucket, Purdue defeated Indiana, 24–23, in West Lafayette. Purdue led, 24–17, with 21 seconds left when Tim Clifford threw a touchdown pass to Steve Corso (Indiana coach Lee Corso's son). Rather than kick an extra point to tie the game, Indiana coach Corso called for a pass play to win the game; the pass was knocked down, and Purdue preserved a one-point margin of victory.

Wisconsin 25, Minnesota 7. In the annual battle for Paul Bunyan' Axe, Wisconsin defeated Minnesota, 25–7, at Camp Randall Stadium in Madison. Wisconsin quarterback, Jess Cole, in his second start, scored four touchdowns.

Iowa 41, Michigan State 0. Iowa shut out Michigan State, 41–0, before a disappointed crowd of 55,123 fans at Spartan Stadium in East Lansing. After the game, Iowa coach Hayden Fry called it a "real fine victory," while Michigan State coach Muddy Waters said: "You saw it – rotten, lousy flat. It was about the worst game I ever saw. We were afraid it would happen, scared to death it would happen with an inexperienced team like we have."

=== Bowl games ===
Three Big Ten teams played in bowl games at the end of the 1980 season, with victories by Michigan in the 1981 Rose Bowl and by Purdue in the 1980 Liberty Bowl and a loss by Ohio State in the 1980 Fiesta Bowl.

Date	Time	Visiting team	Home team	Site	TV	Result	Attendance	Ref.
January 1, 1981	5 p.m.	No. 16 Washington	No. 5 Michigan	Rose Bowl • Pasadena, CA (Rose Bowl)	NBC	W 23–6	104,863	
December 27, 1980	2 p.m.	Missouri	No. 16 Purdue	Liberty Bowl Memorial Stadium • Memphis, Tennessee (Liberty Bowl)	ABC	W 28–25	53,667	
December 26, 1980	2 p.m.	No. 10 Penn State	No. 11 Ohio State	Sun Devil Stadium • Tempe, Arizona (Fiesta Bowl)	NBC	L 19–31	66,738	
^{#}Rankings from AP Poll. All times are in Eastern Standard Time.

== Statistical leaders ==
The Big Ten's individual statistical leaders include the following:

=== Passing yards ===
1. Mark Herrmann, Purdue (3,212)
2. Dave Wilson, Illinois (3,154)
3. Art Schlichter, Ohio State (1,930)
4. Mike Kerrigan, Northwestern (1,816)
5. John Leister, Michigan State (1,559)

=== Rushing yards ===
1. Calvin Murray, Ohio State (1,267)
2. Lonnie Johnson, Indiana (1,075)
3. Butch Woolfolk, Michigan (1,042)
4. Garry White, Minnesota (959)
5. Stan Edwards, Michigan (901)

=== Receiving yards ===
1. Keith Chappelle, Iowa (1,037)
2. Bart Burrell, Purdue (1,001)
3. Dave Young, Purdue (959)
4. Steve Bryant, Purdue (892)
5. Doug Donley, Ohio State (887)

=== Total offense ===
1. Mark Herrmann, Purdue (3,026)
2. Dave Wilson, Illinois (2,960)
3. Art Schlichter, Ohio State (2,255)
4. Mike Kerrigan, Northwestern (1,789)
5. John Leister, Michigan State (1,658)

=== Passing efficiency rating ===
1. Mark Herrmann, Purdue (150.5)
2. Art Schlichter, Ohio State (139.7)
3. John Wangler, Michigan (131.9)
4. Tim Clifford, Indiana (121.6)
5. Dave Wilson, Illinois (117.2)

=== Rushing yards per attempt ===
1. Calvin Murray, Ohio State (6.5)
2. Garry White, Minnesota (5.4)
3. Lonnie Johnson, Indiana (5.4)
4. Tim Spencer, Ohio State (5.3)
5. Butch Woolfolk, Michigan (5.3)

=== Yards per reception ===
1. Doug Donley, Ohio State (20.6)
2. Mike Martin, Illinois (17.9)
3. Steve Bryant, Purdue (17.8)
4. Gary Williams, Ohio State (17.5)
5. Todd Sheets, Northwestern (17.3)

=== Points scored ===
1. Vlade Janakievski, placekicker, Ohio State (90)
2. Rick Anderson, placekicker, Purdue (86)
3. Anthony Carter, wide receiver, Michigan (84)
4. Ali Haji-Sheikh, placekicker, Michigan (70)
5. Marion Barber, Jr., running back, Minnesota (66)
5. Lonnie Johnson, running back, Indiana (66)

== All-conference players ==
During the 1980 season, All-Big Ten teams were selected by the Associated Press (AP) and the United Press International (UPI). Bo Schembechler of Michigan was selected as the Big Ten Coach of the Year. Players who were selected as first-team honorees by both the AP and UPI are as follows:

Offense

- Mark Herrmann, quarterback, Purdue
- Calvin Murray, running back, Ohio State
- Anthony Carter, wide receiver, Michigan
- Doug Donley, wide receiver, Ohio State
- Dave Young, tight end, Purdue
- George Lilja, center, Michigan
- Joe Lukens, offensive guard, Ohio State
- Ed Muransky, offensive tackle, Michigan
- Bubba Paris, offensive tackle Michigan

Defense

- Calvin Clark, defensive lineman, Purdue
- Mike Trgovac, defensive lineman, Michigan
- Andy Cannavino, linebacker, Michigan
- Marcus Marek, linebacker, Ohio State
- Ray Ellis, defensive back, Ohio State
- Tim Wilbur, defensive back, Indiana

Special teams

- Vlade Janakievski, placekicker, Ohio State
- Ray Stachowicz, punter, Michigan State

== All-Americans ==
The NCAA recognizes four selectors as "official" for the 1980 season. They are (1) the American Football Coaches Association (AFCA), (2) the Associated Press (AP), (3) the Football Writers Association of America (FWAA), and (4) the United Press International (UPI). Other notable selectors, though not recognized by the NCAA as official, the Newspaper Enterprise Association (NEA), The Sporting News (TSN), and the Walter Camp Football Foundation (WC).

=== Consensus All-Americans ===
- Mark Herrmann, quarterback, Purdue (AFCA [tie], AP-1, FWAA, UPI-1, WC)
- Dave Young, tight end, Purdue (AFCA, AP-1, FWAA, UPI-1, TSN, WC)

=== Non-consensus first-team selections ===
- Art Schlichter, quarterback, Ohio State (NEA-1)
- Anthony Carter, wide receiver, Michigan (AP-1, NEA-2, TSN)
- George Lilja, center, Michigan (AP-3, UPI-2, NEA-2, WC)
- Ray Stachowicz, punter, Michigan State (UPI-2, NEA-1, WC)

=== Other selections ===
- Joe Lukens, offensive guard, Ohio State (AP-2)
- Mike Trgovac, defensive tackle, Michigan (AP-2)
- John Harty, defensive tackle, Iowa (UPI-2, NEA-2)
- Calvin Clark, defensive tackle, Purdue (AP-3)
- Marcus Marek, linebacker, Ohio State (AP-3, UPI-2)
- Andy Cannavino, linebacker, Michigan (AP-2)
- Tim Wilbur, defensive back, Indiana (AP-2)
- Todd Bell, defensive back, Ohio State (UPI-2, NEA-2)

== 1981 NFL draft ==
The 1981 NFL draft was held in April 1981. The following Big Ten players were selected in the first six rounds of the draft:

Name	Position	Team	Round	Overall pick
Mel Owens	Linebacker	Michigan	1	9
Marion Barber, Jr.	Running back	Minnesota	2	30
Dave Young	Tight end	Purdue	2	32
Doug Donley	Wide receiver	Ohio State	2	53
Ray Stachowicz	Punter	Michigan State	3	62
Al Washington	Linebacker	Ohio State	4	86
Todd Bell	Safety	Ohio State	4	95
Mark Herrmann	Quarterback	Purdue	4	98
George Lilja	Center	Michigan	4	104
Calvin Murray	Running back	Ohio State	4	110
John Gillen	Linebacker	Illinois	5	116
Keith Ferguson	Defensive end	Ohio State	5	131
Calvin Clark	Defensive end	Purdue	5	135
Dave Ahrens	Linebacker	Wisconsin	6	143
Bill Kay	Defensive back	Purdue	6	159
Vince Skillings	--	Ohio State	6	165

In July 1981, Illinois quarterback Dave Wilson entered the supplemental draft after losing a legal challenge seeking an additional year of eligibility. The New Orleans Saints gave up a first round draft choice to secure Wilson. Prior to this, no team had used higher than a fourth round pick to select a player in the supplemental draft.
