= Marion Barber =

Marion Barber may refer to:

- Marion Barber Jr. (born 1959), American football running back for the New York Jets from 1982–1988
- Marion Barber III (1983–2022), American football running back for the Dallas Cowboys and Chicago Bears from 2005–2011
