= Leonard Mitchell =

American football player (born 1958)

No. 99, 74, 73
- Positions: Offensive tackle, defensive end

Personal information
- Born: October 12, 1958 (age 68); Houston, Texas, U.S.
- Listed height: 6 ft 7 in (2.01 m)
- Listed weight: 290 lb (132 kg)

Career information
- High school: Washington (TX)
- College: Houston
- NFL draft: 1981: 1st round, 27th overall pick

Career history
- Philadelphia Eagles (1981–1986); Houston Oilers (1987)*; Atlanta Falcons (1987)
- * Offseason or practice squad member only

Awards and highlights
- Consensus All-American (1980); 2x First-team All-SWC (1979, 1980)

Career NFL statistics
- Games played: 89
- Games started: 55
- Sacks: 1
- Stats at Pro Football Reference

Leonard Boyd Mitchell (born October 12, 1958) is an American former professional football player who was a defensive end in the National Football League (NFL) for seven seasons during the 1980s.

== Career ==
He played college football for the Houston Cougars, and earned All-American honors. Mitchell was selected 27th overall in the first round of the 1981 NFL draft, and played professionally for the Philadelphia Eagles and Atlanta Falcons of the NFL.
