= 1980 All-Big Ten Conference football team =

American college football all-star team

The 1980 All-Big Ten Conference football team consists of American football players chosen by various organizations for All-Big Ten Conference teams for the 1980 college football season.

== Offensive selections ==
=== Quarterbacks ===
- Mark Herrmann, Purdue (AP-1; UPI-1)
- Art Schlichter, Ohio State (AP-2; UPI-2)

=== Running backs ===
- Calvin Murray, Ohio State (AP-1; UPI-1)
- Marion Barber, Jr., Minnesota (AP-1; UPI-2)
- Garry White, Minnesota (UPI-1)
- Stan Edwards, Michigan (AP-2; UPI-2)

=== Wide receivers ===
- Anthony Carter, Michigan (AP-1; UPI-1 [split end])
- Doug Donley, Ohio State (AP-1; UPI-1 [split end])
- Bart Burrell, Purdue (AP-2; UPI-2 [split end])
- Keith Chapelle, Iowa (AP-2; UPI-2 [split end])
- Todd Sheets, Northwestern (AP-2)

=== Tight ends ===
- Dave Young, Purdue (AP-1; UPI-1)
- Bob Stephenson, Indiana (UPI-2)

=== Centers ===
- George Lilja, Michigan (AP-1; UPI-1)
- Jay Hilgenberg, Iowa (UPI-2)

=== Guards ===
- Joe Lukens, Ohio State (AP-1; UPI-1)
- Kurt Becker, Michigan (AP-1; UPI-2)
- John Powers, Michigan (UPI-1)
- Rod Strata, Michigan State (UPI-2)

=== Tackles ===
- Ed Muransky, Michigan (AP-1; UPI-1)
- Bubba Paris, Michigan (AP-1; UPI-1)
- Luther Henson, Ohio State (UPI-2)
- Gerhard Ahting, Indiana (UPI-2)

== Defensive selections ==
=== Defensive linemen ===
- Calvin Clark, Purdue (AP-1; UPI-1)
- Mike Trgovac, Michigan (AP-1; UPI-1)
- Jerome Foster, Ohio State (AP-1; UPI-2)
- Tim Krumrie, Wisconsin (AP-1)
- Jeff Schuh, Minnesota (AP-1; UPI-2)
- John Harty, Iowa (UPI-1)
- Mel Owens, Michigan (UPI-1, AP-2)
- Dave Ahrens, Wisconsin (AP-2; UPI-2)
- Andre Tippett, Iowa (AP-2; UPI-2)
- Keith Ferguson, Ohio State (AP-2)

=== Linebackers ===
- Andy Cannavino, Michigan (AP-1; UPI-1)
- Marcus Marek, Ohio State (AP-1; UPI-1)
- Jim Looney, Purdue (AP-1)
- Marlin Evans, Indiana (UPI-1)
- Tom Kingsbury, Purdue (AP-2 [front five]; UPI-2)
- Pat Dean, Iowa (UPI-2)
- John Gillen, Illinois (AP-2, UPI-2)
- Mike Marks, Purdue (AP-2)
- Craig Walls, Indiana (AP-2)

=== Defensive backs ===
- Ray Ellis, Ohio State (AP-1; UPI-1)
- Tim Wilbur, Indiana (AP-1; UPI-1)
- Bill Kay, Purdue (AP-1; UPI-2)
- Vince Skillings, Ohio State (UPI-1)
- Todd Bell, Ohio State (UPI-1)
- Keith Bostic, Michigan (UPI-2)
- Tony Jackson, Michigan (UPI-2)

== Special teams ==
=== Placekicker ===
- Vlade Janakievski, Ohio State (AP-1; UPI-1)
- Morten Andersen, Michigan State (UPI-2)

=== Punter ===
- Ray Stachowicz, Michigan State (AP-1; UPI-1)
- Tom Orosz, Ohio State (UPI-2)

== Key ==
AP = Associated Press, selected by the AP's media panel

UPI - United Press International

== See also ==
- 1980 College Football All-America Team
