= Luther Henson =

American football player (born 1959)

Profile
- Position: Defensive lineman

Personal information
- Born: March 25, 1959 (age 67); Sandusky, Ohio, U.S.
- Listed height: 6 ft 0 in (1.83 m)
- Listed weight: 275 lb (125 kg)

Career information
- High school: Sandusky
- College: Ohio State
- NFL draft: 1982: undrafted

Career history
- New England Patriots (1982–1984)

Awards and highlights
- First-team All-Big Ten (1979); Second-team All-Big Ten (1980)

Career NFL statistics
- Games: 21
- Sacks: 3
- Stats at Pro Football Reference

Luther Martin Henson (born March 25, 1959) is an American former professional football player who was a defensive lineman for three seasons with the New England Patriots in the National Football League (NFL). He played college football for the Ohio State Buckeyes.

== College career ==
Henson graduated from Sandusky High School 1977 and went on to play defensive tackle at Ohio State University under Buckeyes coaches Woody Hayes and Earle Bruce. Luther was selected as All Big 10 at the defensive tackle position for the years 1979 and 1980.

== NFL career ==
In 1982 Henson was signed as a free agent by New England Patriots under coach Ron Meyer. Henson played between 1982 and 1984.
