= Mark Herrmann =

American football player (born 1959)

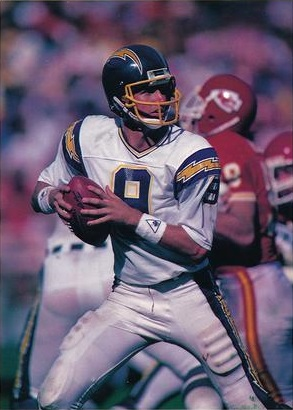
- Herrmann, c. 1985

No. 10, 9
- Position: Quarterback

Personal information
- Born: January 8, 1959 (age 67); Cincinnati, Ohio, U.S.
- Listed height: 6 ft 4 in (1.93 m)
- Listed weight: 184 lb (83 kg)

Career information
- High school: Carmel (Carmel, Indiana)
- College: Purdue (1977–1980)
- NFL draft: 1981: 4th round, 98th overall pick

Career history
- Denver Broncos (1981–1982); Baltimore/Indianapolis Colts (1983–1984); San Diego Chargers (1985–1987); Los Angeles Rams (1988–1989); Indianapolis Colts (1990–1992)

Awards and highlights
- Sammy Baugh Trophy (1980); Unanimous All-American (1980); Big Ten Most Valuable Player (1980); First-team All-Big Ten (1980); 2× Second-team All-Big Ten (1977, 1979); Liberty Bowl MVP (1980); Bluebonnet Bowl MVP (1979); Peach Bowl MVP (1978)

Career NFL statistics
- Passing attempts: 569
- Passing completions: 334
- Completion percentage: 56.2%
- TD–INT: 16–36
- Passing yards: 4,015
- Passer rating: 64.3
- Stats at Pro Football Reference
- College Football Hall of Fame

Mark Donald Herrmann (born January 8, 1959) is an American former professional football player who was a quarterback in the National Football League (NFL) for 12 seasons. Herrmann played college football for the Purdue Boilermakers, and was a unanimous All-American in 1980. He was selected in the 1981 NFL draft by the Denver Broncos, and also played for three other NFL teams during his career. Since 2024, Herrmann has served as the color commentator for Purdue football radio broadcasts.

== Early life ==
Herrmann was born in Cincinnati and raised in Carmel, Indiana, where he attended Carmel High School. Herrmann was a three sport star athlete at Carmel, playing baseball, basketball, and football. On the football field, Herrmann was a quarterback under Indiana Football Hall of Fame coach Dick Dullaghan. As a junior, he threw for 2,443 yards and 23 touchdowns and became the first junior named as the AP Indiana All-State quarterback. He led Carmel to the Class AAA state finals game, losing to Valparaiso High School. Coming into his senior season, Herrmann was named to the All-America first-team squad by Kickoff magazine. Herrmann threw for 1,743 yards and 23 touchdowns, and was named the 1976 AP Indiana All-State quarterback. Herrmann finished his high school football career with 4,327 passing yards.

As a basketball player, Herrmann was a star forward. In his senior basketball season, he led Carmel to the 1977 IHSAA state basketball championship, defeating East Chicago Washington High School, 53–52. Herrmann earned the 1977 Arthur L. Trester Medal for Mental Attitude at the IHSAA state basketball tournament.

Herrmann was a top national quarterback recruit coming out of high school. He was recruited to play football by Purdue, Notre Dame, Nebraska, and Alabama among others. Herrmann initially expressed interest in playing for Notre Dame, but committed to Purdue in January 1977.

== College career ==
=== 1977 season ===
At Purdue, Herrmann joined new head coach Jim Young, hoping to earn playing time as a freshman. Herrmann battled for the starting quarterback position with senior Joe Metallic in the offseason. Metallic was named the day one starter, but Herrmann was still expected to play. In the first game of the season against Michigan State, Herrmann took over for Metallic in the second quarter, completing 20 of 32 passes for 282 yards with two touchdowns and two interceptions. Herrmann was named the UPI Midwest Back of the Week in his debut.

Young named Herrmann as the starter for the following week against Ohio University, the first freshman quarterback to start for Purdue since Bob DeMoss in 1945. Herrmann picked apart the Ohio defense, finishing the 44–7 win with 23 completions on 36 attempts for 339 yards and a touchdown. The next week, Herrmann faced his first major opponent as a starter in #11-ranked Notre Dame. Herrmann and Purdue led at halftime before Notre Dame backup quarterback Joe Montana came in to lead a rally, winning 31–24. Herrmann finished the game with 351 passing yards and three touchdowns. Later in his freshman season, Herrmann led the Boilermakers to a 34–21 win over Iowa. Herrmann threw five touchdown passes in the game, tying a Purdue school record, and completed 13 total passes for 257 yards. Wide receiver Reggie Arnold caught four of Herrmann's touchdowns, setting a school and Big Ten Conference record.

Despite Purdue finishing the 1977 season with a 5–6 record, Herrmann led the Big Ten in passing with an overall season stat line of 175 completions on 319 attempts for a 54.9% completion rate, 2,453 passing yards, and 18 passing touchdowns. He was named to the 1977 All-Big Ten Second Team and was fifth in NCAA Division I in passing yards.

=== 1978 season ===
As a sophomore in 1978, Herrmann continued to show his capabilities as a passer. The Boilermakers started the season 3–1 before upsetting #16-ranked Ohio State, 27–16. Herrmann completed 22 of 34 passes for 210 yards and a touchdown in the victory. Purdue earned a #19 ranking in the AP poll following their upset victory, the team's first top-25 ranking of Herrmann's career. The next week, Purdue beat Illinois, 13–0, and took the lead in the Big Ten standings. Herrmann had 116 passing yards and one touchdown against Illinois, and moved into third place in all-time passing at Purdue.

Herrmann led the Boilermakers to victories over Iowa and Northwestern, where he was pulled early due to large Purdue leads, before tying Wisconsin 24–24. Herrmann threw for seven touchdowns in this three game stretch, including a 75-yard pass to tight end Dave Young (a future teammate on the Baltimore/Indianapolis Colts). Herrmann led Purdue to a 9–2–1 record in 1978 and a final ranking of #13 in the AP poll. The Boilermakers earned a trip to the 1978 Peach Bowl, where Herrmann led Purdue to a 41–21 victory over Georgia Tech. Herrmann threw for 166 yards and two touchdowns and was named the game's most valuable player. He ended the 1978 season with 1,904 passing yards and 14 touchdowns.

=== 1979 season ===
Expectations for Herrmann were high entering his junior year, and the Boilermakers were ranked #6 in the AP preseason poll. The season opened against Wisconsin, where Herrmann continued his dominance in a 41–20 victory. He completed 20 of 26 passes for 291 yards and four touchdowns, overtaking Bob Griese for second on Purdue's all-time leading passing list. Herrmann was knocked out of the next game against UCLA, leading to the Boilermakers upset loss. He responded the next week against #5-ranked Notre Dame, leading Purdue to a 28–22 comeback victory. Purdue was down 20–7 in the third quarter before scoring three touchdowns in the third and fourth quarters. Herrmann had two touchdown passes, one to Dave Young and one to former Carmel High School teammate Bart Burrell.

Herrmann and Purdue eked out a victory over Oregon before suffering an upset loss to Minnesota, 14–31. Herrmann had 40 pass attempts for 235 yards against Minnesota, but threw four interceptions. Herrmann bounced back the next week in a 28–14 win over Illinois, during which he surpassed Mike Phipps to become Purdue's all-time leading passer with 5,452 yards. Two weeks later, Herrmann broke Michigan State's Ed Smith's Big Ten all-time passing record against Northwestern in a 20–16 victory, standing at 5,786 career passing yards after the game. Herrmann and #14 Purdue then upset #10-ranked Michigan, 24–21, in a defensive struggle. Herrmann had a one-yard touchdown run in the game.

In the 1979 Old Oaken Bucket rivalry game against Indiana, Herrmann led Purdue with a career-high 26 pass completions for 269 yards in the 37–21 victory. Herrmann was injured in the fourth quarter, and left the game on a stretcher due to a concussion.

Purdue earned a berth to the 1979 Bluebonnet Bowl against Tennessee. The Boilermakers got out to a 21–0 lead before letting Tennessee come back, 22–21, late in the fourth quarter. Herrmann drove Purdue 80 yards in the last 90 seconds of the game, capped by a 17-yard touchdown pass to Dave Young that sealed the 28–22 victory. Herrmann threw for 303 yards and three touchdowns on the day, and was named the game's most valuable player. Purdue finished the year ranked #10 in the AP poll with a 10–2 record, and Herrmann had a Big Ten-leading 182 pass completions for 2,074 yards and 13 touchdowns. Herrmann was named to the 1979 All-Big Ten Second Team and also finished eighth in the 1979 Heisman Trophy voting.

=== 1980 season ===
Herrmann's senior year did not start as he had hoped. Two days before the opening game against #11 Notre Dame, Herrmann sprained his thumb in practice. He missed the game, and #9 Purdue lost, 10–31. Herrmann returned the following week against Wisconsin, and despite throwing for 347 yards he did not find the endzone. Herrmann left the game late in the fourth quarter with a leg injury, but Purdue still won, 12–6, on four field goals. Herrmann and Purdue then lost for the second consecutive season to UCLA, but during the game Herrmann was 25 for 42 with 282 yards and one touchdown. His lone touchdown pass to Burrell broke the Big Ten record for all-time touchdown passes with 49.

Herrmann followed up the loss with a commanding victory over Miami (OH), where he threw for 291 yards and two touchdowns. Head coach Jim Young had planned to take Herrmann out of the game at half time due to poor play, but instead allowed him to stay in the game and call plays from the huddle as an "on-field offensive coordinator." The next week against Minnesota, Herrmann continued his on-field playcalling duties in a 21–7 victory. Herrmann threw for 191 yards and two touchdowns before leaving the game with an injury. Herrmann's next game as full-time play caller saw Purdue defeat Illinois, 45–20. Herrmann threw for 371 yards and four touchdowns, setting a Big Ten single-game passing yards record. He was pulled from the game due to the lead, which allowed Illinois' quarterback Dave Wilson to overtake Herrmann's record with 451 passing yards.

On October 25, 1980, Herrmann broke the NCAA career passing yards record in a win over Michigan State. Herrmann led Purdue to a 36–25 comeback victory, and finished the game with 340 passing yards and a career total of 8,087 yards. He became the first collegiate quarterback to throw for more than 8,000 career yards, with the previous record of 7,818 yards held by Washington State's Jack Thompson. Herrmann continued his record setting pace the next week with a 52–31 victory over Northwestern. Herrmann completed 17 of 21 passes for 210 yards and three touchdowns, setting the NCAA record for career completions with 651 total. Purdue faced Iowa on November 8, 1980, where Herrmann set even more school and Big Ten Conference records. Herrmann threw for 439 yards and three touchdowns in only three quarters of play, as Purdue won 58–13. Herrmann's season-worst performance came in the second to last regular season game against #11 Michigan, where he threw four interceptions in a 26–0 loss. Herrmann rebounded the next week in the 1980 Old Oaken Bucket game, where he threw for 323 yards and a touchdown. He broke the 9,000 career passing yards mark in this game, also becoming the first NCAA quarterback to do so.

In the 1980 Liberty Bowl, Herrmann and Purdue beat Missouri, 28–25. Herrmann set a then-Liberty Bowl record with 289 passing yards and four touchdowns. He earned his third straight bowl game most valuable player award, an NCAA first.

Herrmann earned many postseason accolades, including a unanimous All-American selection to the 1980 All-America First Team, 1980 All-Big Ten First Team, the Sammy Baugh Trophy, the Chicago Tribune Silver Football as the Big Ten Conference most valuable player, and finished fourth in the 1980 Heisman Trophy voting.

=== College statistics ===
Season	Team	GP	Passing					
Season	Team	GP	Cmp	Att	Pct	Yds	TD	Int
1977	Purdue	11	175	319	54.9	2,453	18	27
1978	Purdue	11	152	274	55.5	1,904	14	12
1979	Purdue	11	182	309	58.9	2,074	13	19
1980	Purdue	11	220	340	64.7	2,923	19	17
Total		44	729	1,242	58.7	9,354	64	75

As of the 2025 season, Herrmann is ranked fourth all-time in passing yards and fifth all-time in touchdown passes in Purdue football history. His NCAA career passing yards record stood for only one season before it was broken by BYU quarterback Jim McMahon in 1981. Herrmann was elected to the College Football Hall of Fame in May 2010.

== Professional career ==
Although Herrmann was not considered as a guaranteed first-round pick, he was expected to be one of the first quarterbacks taken in the 1981 NFL draft. Herrmann fell to the fourth round where he was selected by the Denver Broncos with the 98th overall pick. He was the fourth quarterback taken in that year's draft.

=== Denver Broncos (1981–1982) ===
Herrmann joined a Broncos team with veteran quarterback Craig Morton as the expected starter for the 1981 season. In August 1981, the Broncos traded for quarterback Steve DeBerg, relegating Herrmann to the third string. Herrmann saw no game action in 1981.

In the 1982 strike-shortened season, Herrmann made two appearances and started in the final game of the year. In his first professional appearance, Herrmann came on in relief of DeBerg at halftime against the Los Angeles Raiders. Herrmann threw four interceptions in his debut, but had 233 yards and one touchdown. His first professional start came the following week against the Seattle Seahawks where he went 18 for 32 with 188 yards and one interception and a rushing touchdown in an 11–13 loss.

Prior to the 1983 season, Herrmann was traded by the Broncos to the Baltimore Colts, along with offensive lineman Chris Hinton, as part of the exchange for the Colts' newly drafted quarterback, John Elway. Herrmann expressed shock at his inclusion in the trade at the time.

=== Baltimore/Indianapolis Colts (1983–1984) ===
Herrmann joined the Colts in 1983 expecting to restart his professional career. Instead, he broke his collar bone in the late offseason and missed the first 10 games. Upon his return, he backed up Mike Pagel, but was called upon at halftime of the week 11 game against the Pittsburgh Steelers. Herrmann had 128 passing yards and one interception in the loss. His lone start of that season came in the following week against the Miami Dolphins, which ended in a 37–0 shutout loss.

In 1984, the Colts moved to Indianapolis, which saw Herrmann return to his hometown. He again served as a backup behind Pagel and Art Schlichter. Herrmann made three appearances that year, with two starts, and earned his first professional win as a starting quarterback against the Steelers on October 21, 1984. Herrmann left the game early after suffering a thigh injury, and Pagel came in to lead the Colts to a win. Herrmann ended the season with 352 passing yards, one touchdown, and six interceptions.

=== San Diego Chargers (1985–1987) ===
Herrmann initially re-signed with the Colts as a free agent in February 1985. However, he was soon traded to the San Diego Chargers for a conditional draft selection. Herrmann joined the Chargers as the backup to Dan Fouts in the pass-heavy "Air Coryell" offense under head coach Don Coryell. Herrmann saw his first action with the Chargers in a week three blowout victory over the Seahawks. Herrmann led the game's final drive and contributed 78 passing yards and one touchdown. Fouts suffered a knee injury the next week against the Cleveland Browns, and Herrmann again took over in his absence. He was 16-for-23 for 178 in the 7–21 loss. In his first start with the Chargers, Herrmann faced the Seahawks again and completed 26 of 35 passes for 344 yards, three touchdowns, and three interceptions. Despite his performance, the Chargers lost, 21–26. He earned his first win with the Chargers against the Kansas City Chiefs, completing 26 of 36 passes for 320 yards and two touchdowns in the 31–20 victory. In his last start before Fouts' return, Herrmann was 12-for-26 and 128 passing yards in a 17–21 loss at the Minnesota Vikings. Herrmann saw limited action the rest of the season until week 15, where Fouts was again injured in the third quarter of a game against the Philadelphia Eagles. Herrmann rallied the Chargers and won the game on a 23-yard touchdown pass to Charlie Joiner. In the final game of the 1985 season, Herrmann started for the injured Fouts against the Chiefs. The Chargers were down 35–3 at halftime, and despite throwing 37 completions on 58 attempts for 362 yards and three touchdowns, Herrmann's comeback bid fell short with a 34–38 loss. He finished the 1985 season with 1537 passing yards, 10 touchdowns, and 10 interceptions in what became his best statistical season in the NFL.

In 1986, Herrmann again served as Fouts' backup, but appeared in six games with one start. Herrmann was injured in the first game of the season on his lone pass attempt, suffering a sprained knee. His next appearance came in week seven, when Fouts suffered a concussion in the first half against the Chiefs. Herrmann went 18-for-32 in the second half with 181 passing yards and one touchdown. He started the next game against the Eagles, but only passed for 122 yards and one interception before being knocked out of the game with a concussion in the 7–23 loss. Coryell resigned as head coach after the loss to the Eagles, and was replaced by Al Saunders. Herrmann missed time due to the concussion, and did not see the field until a week 12 Thursday night primetime game against the Los Angeles Raiders. Fouts was injured, and Saunders chose to start Tom Flick over Herrmann. Flick was ineffective and Herrmann replaced him at halftime with a 31–10 deficit. Herrmann led the Chargers to overtime, but ultimately ended in a loss. He had 13 completions for 198 yards and a touchdown. Herrmann saw limited game action during the remainder of the season, and finished the year with 627 passing yards, two touchdowns, and three interceptions.

Herrmann re-signed with the Chargers for the 1987 season, but the season was shortened by a player's strike. Herrmann made his first appearance of 1987 in a week 11 start against the Seahawks, but was benched in the second half for Fouts despite him being injured. Herrmann replaced Fouts in week 13 against the Houston Oilers, and threw for 142 passing yards and one touchdown in the loss. Herrmann then started the final game of the season against the Broncos, which saw him throw four interceptions in a shutout loss.

In April 1988, the Chargers traded Herrmann back to the Indianapolis Colts for an undisclosed draft pick.

=== Los Angeles Rams (1988–1989) ===
After spending most of the 1988 offseason with the Colts, Herrmann was released in late August. He then signed with the Los Angeles Rams as the backup for Jim Everett only a few days prior to the opening game. Herrmann rejoined offensive coordinator Ernie Zampese, who had served in the same capacity with him in San Diego during the 1985 and 1986 seasons. Herrmann saw limited game time, only throwing five passes, as Everett led the Rams to a 10–6 record before losing in the Wild Card round of the playoffs to the Vikings.

In 1989, Herrmann again backed up Everett and saw very limited time in three games. The Rams went 11-5 and made it to the 1989 NFC Championship Game, where they lost to the eventual Super Bowl XXIV champion San Francisco 49ers.

=== Indianapolis Colts (1990–1992) ===
Herrmann re-signed with the Rams after the 1989 season, but was released after preseason play ended in the final roster cuts. He was expected to go back to the Rams after clearing waivers, but was instead picked up by the Indianapolis Colts. In his third stint with the Colts, Herrmann joined the team as the presumptive third-string quarterback behind rookie Jeff George and veteran Jack Trudeau. Herrmann saw brief playing time against the Oilers in week three, as both George and Trudeau were injured. However, Herrmann separated his shoulder from a hard hit in the game and was placed on injured reserve.

In 1991, Herrmann's only significant playing time came in a 17–23 loss in week 15 against the New England Patriots. He went 11-for-19 with 137 yards and three interceptions. The Colts finished the year at 1–15.

Herrmann took a try out with the Broncos in the 1992 offseason, but he chose to return to the Colts to battle Tom Tupa for the third quarterback role. Herrmann was named the week one starter after George suffered a thumb injury and Trudeau remained unsigned pending contract negotiations. This was Herrmann's first time serving as an opening week starter in his professional career. Herrmann and the Colts beat the Cleveland Browns 14–3, behind a steady performance from Herrmann and a solid defensive effort. This was Herrmann's first start since 1987 and his first win as a starter since 1985. However, Herrmann was unceremoniously waived less than 24 hours after the victory in a surprise move to make roster space for Trudeau, who was returning to the roster.

Herrmann remarked of his surprise exit, "This whole ordeal has really cut into me...I had so much invested into this season. I had put so much into the past two games. It's taken a lot out of me. If Sunday was it, I'll have the satisfaction of knowing I went out a winner." Despite some interest from other teams, Herrmann did not sign elsewhere and effectively ended his professional career.

Herrmann appeared in just 40 games during his 11-year pro career, completing 334 passes in 561 attempts (59.5%) for a total of 4,015 yards. He threw 16 touchdown passes and was intercepted 36 times.

== Post-football career ==
After retiring from the NFL, Herrmann became the Associate Director of Educational Programs for the NCAA before serving in several capacities at his alma mater, Purdue University.

In 1995, he began color commentary duties for Indianapolis Colts radio broadcasts alongside Bob Lamey, continuing in that role until the 2004 season. In 2024, Herrmann took over radio color commentary for Purdue football broadcasts alongside play-by-play commentator Tim Newton.

== Personal life ==
Herrmann lives in Indianapolis with his wife Susie. He has three children.
