= 1979 All-Big Ten Conference football team =

American college football all-star team

The 1979 All-Big Ten Conference football team consists of American football players chosen by various organizations for All-Big Ten Conference teams for the 1979 Big Ten Conference football season.

== Offensive selections ==
=== Quarterbacks ===
- Art Schlichter, Ohio State (AP-1, UPI-1)
- Mark Herrmann, Purdue (AP-2)
- Tim Clifford, Indiana (UPI-2)

=== Running backs ===
- Dennis Mosley, Iowa (AP-1, UPI-1)
- Butch Woolfolk, Michigan (AP-1, UPI-1)
- Dave Mohapp, Ohio State (UPI-1 [fullback])
- Mark Harkrader, Indiana (UPI-2)
- Marion Barber Jr., Minnesota (UPI-2)
- Garry White, Minnesota (UPI-2)

=== Split ends ===
- Elmer Bailey, Minnesota (AP-1)

=== Flankers ===
- Doug Donley, Ohio State (AP-1; UPI-2)

=== Tight ends ===
- Dave Young, Purdue (AP-1)
- Mark Brammer, Michigan State (UPI-1)
- Doug Marsh, Michigan (UPI-2)

=== Centers ===
- Jay Hilgenberg, Iowa (AP-1)
- Tom Waugh, Ohio State (UPI-1)
- Pete Quinn, Purdue (UPI-2)

=== Guards ===
- Ken Fritz, Ohio State (AP-1, UPI-1)
- Dale Schwan, Purdue (AP-1, UPI-2)
- John Arbeznik, Michigan (UPI-1)
- Ernie Andria, Ohio State (UPI-2)

=== Tackles ===
- Steve McKenzie, Purdue (AP-1, UPI-1)
- Ray Snell, Wisconsin (AP-1, UPI-1)
- Mark Stein, Minnesota (UPI-2)
- Angelo Fields, Michigan State (UPI-2)

== Defensive selections ==
=== Defensive linemen ===
- Curtis Greer, Michigan (AP-1, UPI-1)
- Ken Loushin, Purdue (AP-1, UPI-1)
- Keena Turner, Purdue (AP-1, UPI-2)
- Luther Henson, Ohio State (UPI-1)
- Calvin Clark, Purdue (AP-1)
- Jim Laughlin, Ohio State (AP-1, UPI-1 [linebacker[)
- Mike Trgovac, Michigan (UPI-1)
- Dave Jackson, Purdue (UPI-2)
- Bernard Hay, Michigan State (UPI-2)
- Dave Ahrens, Wisconsin (UPI-2)

=== Linebackers ===
- Ron Simpkins, Michigan (AP-1, UPI-1)
- Dan Bass, Michigan State (AP-1, UPI-1)
- Leven Weiss, Iowa (AP-1, UPI-2)
- Mel Owens, Michigan (UPI-2)
- Al Washington, Ohio State (UPI-2)

=== Defensive backs ===
- Mike Guess, Ohio State (AP-1, UPI-1)
- Mike Jolly, Michigan (AP-1, UPI-1)
- Tim Wilbur, Indiana (AP-1, UPI-2)
- Todd Bell, Ohio State (UPI-1)
- Vince Skillings, Ohio State (UPI-1)
- Ray Ellis, Ohio State (UPI-2)
- Wayne Smith, Purdue (UPI-2)
- Mike Harden, Michigan (UPI-2)

== Special teams ==
=== Placekicker ===
- Vlade Janakievski, Ohio State (AP-1, UPI-1)
- Morten Andersen, Michigan State (UPI-2)

=== Punter ===
- Ray Stachowicz, Michigan State (AP-1, UPI-1)
- Reggie Roby, Iowa (UPI-2)

== Key ==
AP = Associated Press

UPI = United Press International

== See also ==
- 1979 College Football All-America Team
