= 1980 Fiesta Bowl =

American college football game

- 10th Fiesta Bowl
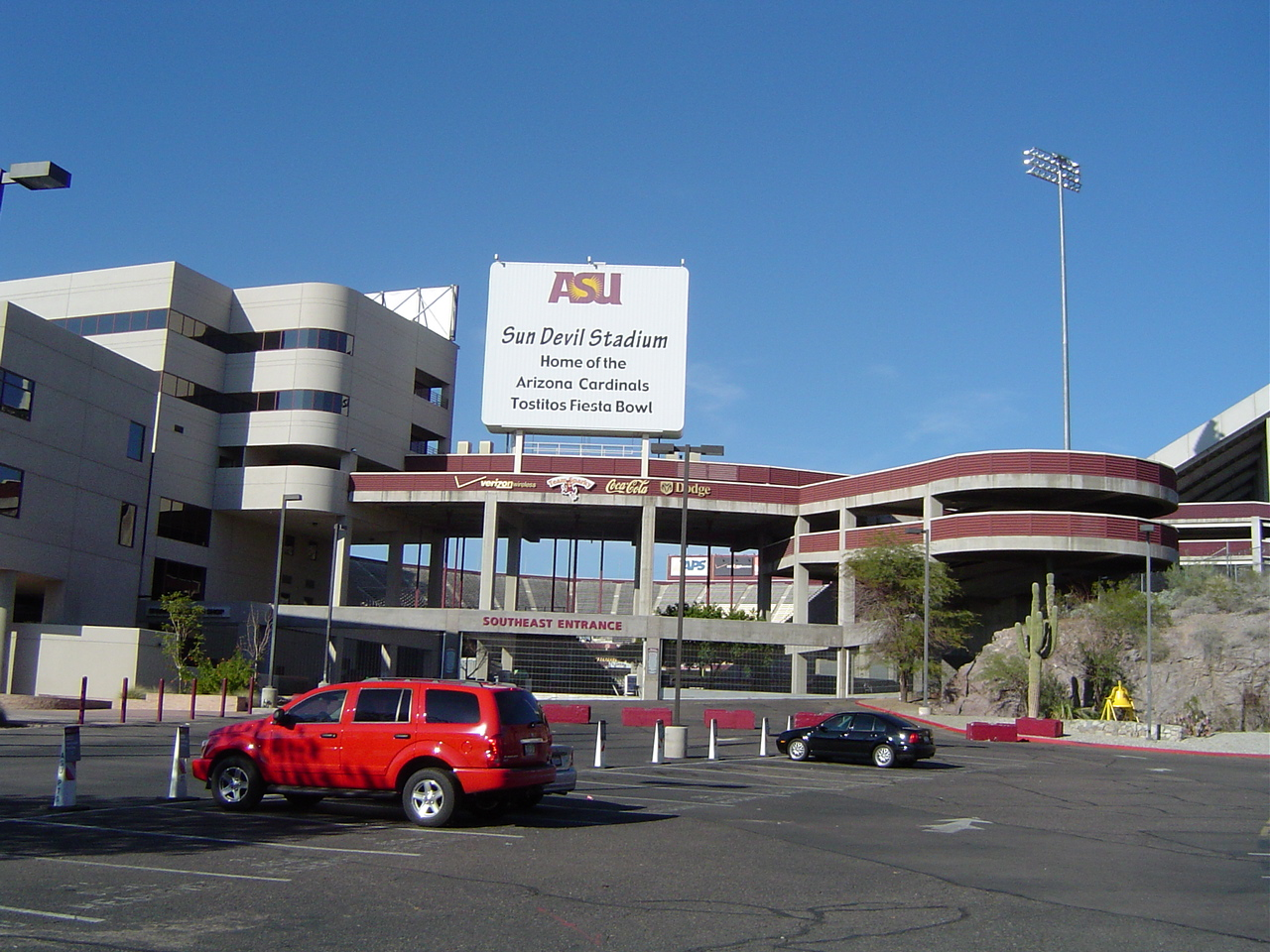
- Sun Devil Stadium in Tempe, Arizona, hosted the Fiesta Bowl.
Penn State Nittany Lions	Ohio State Buckeyes
(9–2)	(9–2)
Independent	Big Ten
31	19
Head coach: Joe Paterno	Head coach: Earle Bruce
AP / Coaches; 10 / 10	AP / Coaches; 11 / 14
	1	2	3	4	Total
Penn State	7	3	7	14	31
Ohio State	6	13	0	0	19
- Date: December 26, 1980
- Season: 1980
- Stadium: Sun Devil Stadium
- Location: Tempe, Arizona
- MVP: Curt Warner (Penn State RB); Frank Case (Penn State DE)
- Favorite: Ohio State by 1 point
- Referee: Ken Faulkner (SWC)
- Attendance: 66,738

United States TV coverage
- Network: NBC
- Announcers: Charlie Jones, Len Dawson

The 1980 Fiesta Bowl was the tenth edition of the college football bowl game, played at Sun Devil Stadium in Tempe, Arizona on Friday, December 26. Part of the 1980–81 bowl game season, it matched the tenth-ranked Penn State Nittany Lions and the #11 Ohio State Buckeyes of the Big Ten Conference. A slight underdog, independent Penn State rallied in the second half to win, 31–19.

This was the last Fiesta Bowl played in December until 1997.

== Teams ==
This was the first Fiesta Bowl to feature a team from the Big Ten.

=== Penn State ===
Penn State had played three ranked opponents during the regular season (#3 Nebraska, at #9 Missouri, and #4 Pittsburgh), and won only the second one. They were looking to beat a ranked opponent to finish their season in their first Fiesta Bowl appearance in three years.

=== Ohio State ===
Ohio State was the runner-up in the Big Ten Conference after losing to Michigan which dropped them from fifth to eleventh in the AP Poll. This was their first Fiesta Bowl appearance.

== Game summary ==
The only bowl game on the day after Christmas, it kicked off shortly past 1:30 pm MST.

Halfback Curt Warner started the scoring with a 64-yard touchdown run on the first play from scrimmage, giving the Nittany Lions the early lead. Not to be deterred, Art Schlichter threw a touchdown pass to Doug Donley, but the Vlade Janakievski kick missed. The Buckeyes responded again with a Gary Williams touchdown catch from Schlichter to give the Buckeyes the lead, though the two-point conversion attempt failed as the pitchout went astray. Schlichter threw another touchdown pass to Donley to increase the lead to 19–7, as backup kicker Bob Atha converted. Herb Menhardt kicked a 38-yard field goal for Penn State to make it 19–10 at halftime.

Ohio State appeared to be in control, with Schlichter connecting on 15 of 22 for 244 yards and three touchdowns while Penn State had just one early touchdown. But the second half was a different story as the Nittany Lions came alive. Sophomore quarterback Todd Blackledge, despite throwing 8 for 22 for only 117 yards the whole game, scored early in the third quarter on a three-yard run to narrow the lead to 19–17. Schlichter went 5 for 13 in the second half for 58 yards with an interception (and no touchdowns) as the Buckeyes were shut out. Penn State turned on the running game, as Jonathan Williams scored from four yards out early in the fourth quarter to gain the lead; fullback Booker Moore broke free for a 37-yard touchdown run with less than a minute remaining to seal the 31–19 victory.

Warner rushed for 156 yards on eighteen carries (8.7 avg.) and was the game MVP on offense; lineman Frank Case took the defensive honor.

=== Scoring ===
First quarter

- Penn State – Curt Warner 64-yard run (Herb Menhardt kick)
- Ohio State – Doug Donley 23-yard pass from Art Schlichter (Vlade Janakievski kick failed)

Second quarter

- Ohio State – Gary Williams 33-yard pass from Schlichter (run failed)
- Ohio State – Donley 19-yard pass from Schlichter (Bob Atha kick)
- Penn State – Menhardt 38-yard field goal

Third quarter

- Penn State – Todd Blackledge 3-yard run (Menhardt kick)

Fourth quarter

- Penn State – Jonathan Williams 4-yard run (Menhardt kick)
- Penn State – Booker Moore 37-yard run (Menhardt kick)

== Statistics ==
Statistics	Penn State	Ohio State
First downs	22	23
Yards rushing	56–351	39–110
Yards passing	117	302
Passing	8–22–0	20–35–1
Return yards	74	10
Total Offense	78–468	74–412
Punts–Average	5–40.8	7–38.7
Fumbles–Lost	1–1	1–0
Turnovers	1	1
Penalties–Yards	2–10	2–30

== Aftermath ==
The Nittany Lions won all three Fiesta Bowl appearances in the 1980s. They returned the following year to defeat the USC Trojans, then won the national championship in January 1987, in prime time over the top-ranked Miami Hurricanes. The Buckeyes' next Fiesta appearance was three years after this game, in January 1984, a win over Pittsburgh.

In the developing rivalry with the Buckeyes, Penn State had now taken the last two meetings and was 6–2 overall. As of 2020, this is the only bowl meeting between these two; Penn State joined the Big Ten in 1993 and they play annually in the regular season.

== See also ==
- Ohio State–Penn State football rivalry
