= Ray Ellis (American football) =

American football player (born 1959)

No. 24
- Position: Safety

Personal information
- Born: April 27, 1959 (age 67); Canton, Ohio, U.S.
- Listed height: 6 ft 1 in (1.85 m)
- Listed weight: 192 lb (87 kg)

Career information
- High school: McKinley (Canton)
- College: Ohio State
- NFL draft: 1981: 12th round, 331st overall pick

Career history
- Philadelphia Eagles (1981–1985); Cleveland Browns (1986–1987); Indianapolis Colts (1988)*
- * Offseason or practice squad member only

Awards and highlights
- First-team All-Big Ten (1980); Second-team All-Big Ten (1979)

Career NFL statistics
- Interceptions: 14
- Fumble recoveries: 8
- Touchdowns: 1
- Stats at Pro Football Reference

Kerwin Ray Ellis (born April 27, 1959) is an American former professional football player who was a safety in the National Football League (NFL) for the Philadelphia Eagles and the Cleveland Browns from 1981 to 1987. He played college football for the Ohio State Buckeyes. He finished with 3 sacks, and 14 interceptions in his NFL career. Informal founder of the Dawg Pound while playing for the Cleveland Browns in the early 80's due to his membership in the Omega Psi Phi fraternity at Ohio State.
