= Bill Kay (defensive back) =

American football player (born 1960)

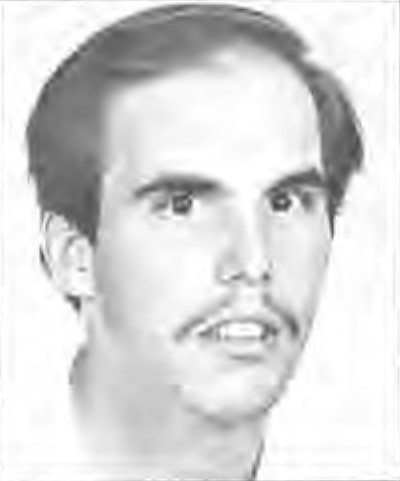
- Kay in 1982

No. 22, 31
- Position: Defensive back

Personal information
- Born: January 10, 1960 (age 66); Detroit, Michigan, U.S.
- Listed height: 6 ft 1 in (1.85 m)
- Listed weight: 190 lb (86 kg)

Career information
- High school: Proviso East (Maywood, Illinois)
- College: Purdue
- NFL draft: 1981: 6th round, 159th overall pick

Career history
- Houston Oilers (1981–1983); St. Louis Cardinals (1984); San Diego Chargers (1984)

Awards and highlights
- First-team All-Big Ten (1980)

Career NFL statistics
- Interceptions: 4
- Stats at Pro Football Reference

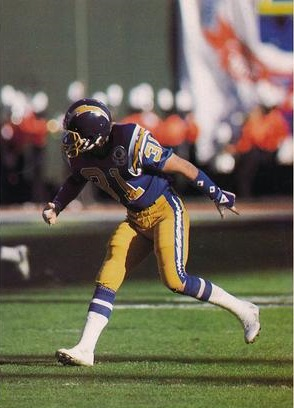
Kay, playing for the Chargers in 1984

William Henry Kay (born January 10, 1960) is an American former professional football player who was a defensive back for four seasons for the Houston Oilers, San Diego Chargers, and St. Louis Cardinals of the National Football League (NFL) He played college football for the Purdue Boilermakers (1977–1981). Kay was a defensive back and a four-year Varsity P Club award winner. He played high school football at Proviso East High School in Maywood, Illinois. He was coached by former Boilermakers Joe Krupa and Mike Williams. Kay was selected in sixth round of the 1981 NFL draft by the Oilers.
