= George Lilja =

American football player (born 1958)

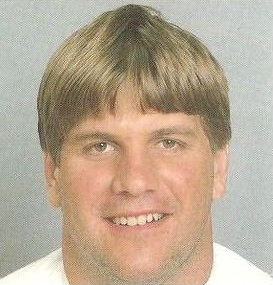

No. 59, 61, 62, 64
- Position: Center

Personal information
- Born: March 3, 1958 (age 68); Evergreen Park, Illinois, U.S.
- Listed height: 6 ft 4 in (1.93 m)
- Listed weight: 264 lb (120 kg)

Career information
- High school: Carl Sandburg (Orland Park, Illinois)
- College: Michigan
- NFL draft: 1981: 4th round, 104th overall pick

Career history
- Los Angeles Rams (1981–1982); New York Jets (1983–1984); Cleveland Browns (1984–1986); Dallas Cowboys (1987); Los Angeles Raiders (1989)*; Atlanta Falcons (1989)*
- * Offseason or practice squad member only

Awards and highlights
- Second-team All-American (1980); First-team All-Big Ten (1980)

Career NFL statistics
- Games played: 54
- Games started: 17
- Fumble recoveries: 1
- Stats at Pro Football Reference

George Vincent Lilja (born March 3, 1958) is an American former professional football player who was an offensive lineman in the National Football League (NFL) for the Los Angeles Rams, New York Jets, Cleveland Browns, and Dallas Cowboys. He played college football for the Michigan Wolverines.

== Early life ==
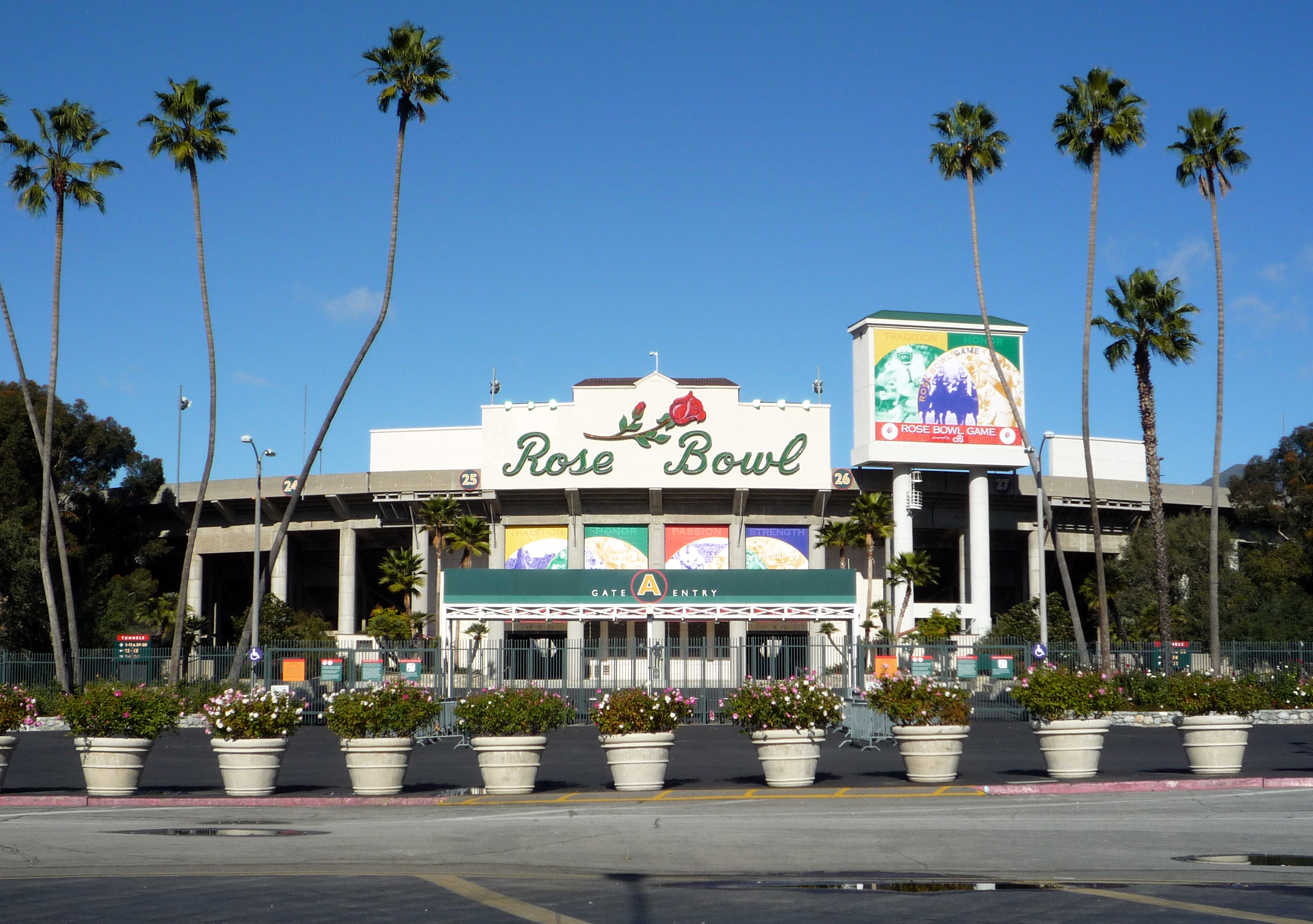
Lilja and the 1980 Big Ten Champions appeared in the Rose Bowl.

Lilja attended Carl Sandburg High School in Orland Park, Illinois, where he was both a football and baseball standout. As a senior, he received All-Chicago honors as a center and defensive tackle.

He accepted a football scholarship from the University of Michigan. Lilja wore #59 for four years as a varsity player from 1977-1980. In 1976, he redshirted as a junior varsity player.

As a junior in 1979, he was named the starter at Center, for a team that played in the Gator Bowl.

As a senior in 1980, Lilja received numerous awards and honors, including being named the team's co-captain (with Anthony Carter), receiving the University's Myer Morton Award (given by the M Club of Chicago for the football player who shows the greatest development and most promise as a result of spring practice), and being named third-team All-American by the Associated Press. He was named second-team All-American and All-Big Ten by different sports news organizations. He started 24 straight games at center during his junior and senior seasons and is one of eleven centers to become an All-American for Michigan football.

During the 1980 Purdue game, Lilja's jersey was ripped to the point where he could not go back out and play. When the equipment staff could not locate his backup jersey, they took the jersey of freshman center Doug James, put it on Lilja, and sent him back into the game. After the game, James got calls from friends expressing surprise that the freshman had gotten playing time in a big game.

As the 1980 Big Ten Conference Champions, the team played in the 1981 Rose Bowl, which marked the first bowl game victory for head coach Bo Schembechler. It was also Lilja's last game for Michigan, which the Wolverines won 23–6, over Washington. Teammate Brad Bates later recalled: "I was walking off the field with George Lilja, and he said, 'Let's turn around for a Kodak moment,' . . . 'You could see that big orange backdrop against the mountains. This was Bo's first bowl victory.".

== Professional career ==
=== Los Angeles Rams ===
Lilja was selected by the Los Angeles Rams in the fourth round (104th overall) of the 1981 NFL draft. As a rookie, he suffered an ankle injury and spent the entire year on the injured reserve list. In 1982, he played in all nine games of the shortened strike season, mostly on special teams. He was waived in August 1983.

=== New York Jets ===
On September 27, 1983, he was signed by the New York Jets. He played as a backup offensive tackle, before being released on November 15, 1984.

=== Cleveland Browns ===
On November 21, 1984, he was signed as a free agent by the Cleveland Browns, to play under interim head coach Marty Schottenheimer. He started in the last game against the Houston Oilers.

In 1985, he was named the starter at left guard over Robert Jackson. He contributed to both Earnest Byner and Kevin Mack rushing for over 1,000 yards, becoming just the third running back tandem on the same team to achieve that feat in one regular season.

In 1986, he was a backup playing mostly on special teams, on a team with a 12–4 record, that advanced to the American Football Conference championship game against the Denver Broncos in the 1986 NFL Playoffs. Their playoff run included back-to-back overtime (the first being double overtime) home playoff games decided by 23-20 scores. The latter game is known for The Drive. He was released on September 7, 1987.

=== Dallas Cowboys ===
On October 14, 1987, he was signed as a free agent by the Dallas Cowboys to provide depth at center. In November, he began sharing snaps with starter Tom Rafferty, with Lilja playing on running downs and Rafferty replacing him in passing situations. In 1988, he was competing with Rafferty for the starting position, until suffering a broken left middle finger. He was released on September 27.

=== Los Angeles Raiders ===
In 1989, he was signed by the Los Angeles Raiders as a free agent. He was cut on July 22.

=== Atlanta Falcons ===
In July 1989, he was signed by the Atlanta Falcons. He was released on September 4. In his career he appeared in 54 games with 17 starts.

== Personal life ==
He is married to his wife Meg, and they have four children, Danielle, David, Bethany, and George III, and one granddaughter, Eloise. Lilja is not related to Ryan Lilja. Lilja's parents raised him in a Christian manner with his five brothers and two sisters.

Lilja has long been part of Christian athlete groups and writes and speaks about his Christian faith. He espouses the biblical quote:

Seek first His kingdom and His righteousness and all these things will be given to you as well - Matthew 6:33
