= Al Washington =

American football player (born 1958)

No. 52, 17
- Position: Linebacker

Personal information
- Born: September 25, 1958 (age 68); Erie, Pennsylvania, U.S.
- Listed height: 6 ft 3 in (1.91 m)
- Listed weight: 235 lb (107 kg)

Career information
- High school: Benedictine (Cleveland, Ohio)
- College: Ohio State
- NFL draft: 1981: 4th round, 86th overall pick

Career history
- New York Jets (1981); Ottawa Rough Riders (1983–1986)

Awards and highlights
- Second-team All-Big Ten (1979)

Career NFL statistics
- Games played: 16
- Stats at Pro Football Reference

Alvin Kent Washington (born September 25, 1958) is an American former professional football player who was a linebacker in the National Football League (NFL) and Canadian Football League (NFL). He played college football for the Ohio State Buckeyes and was selected by the New York Jets in the fourth round of the 1981 NFL draft.
