= Vince Skillings =

American gridiron football player (born 1959)

Profile
- Position: Cornerback

Personal information
- Born: May 3, 1959 (age 67); Latrobe, Pennsylvania, U.S.
- Listed height: 5 ft 11 in (1.80 m)
- Listed weight: 183 lb (83 kg)

Career information
- High school: Derry (PA)
- College: Ohio State
- NFL draft: 1981: 6th round, 163rd overall pick

Career history
- Dallas Cowboys (1981)*; Montreal Alouettes (1981); Buffalo Bills (1982)*; Montreal Concordes (1982–1983); Los Angeles Raiders (1984)*
- * Offseason or practice squad member only

Awards and highlights
- 3× First-team All-Big Ten (1978, 1979, 1980)

Career CFL statistics
- Games played: 8

Vincent Scott Skillings (born May 3, 1959) is an American former professional Canadian football cornerback in the Canadian Football League (CFL) for the Montreal Alouettes and Montreal Concordes. He played college football at Ohio State University.

== Early life ==
Skillings attended Derry High School, where he practiced football and track. He was a two-way player at running back and cornerback. He received All-state honors as a senior.

He was state finalist in the 100, 220 and 440-yard dash as a senior.

== College career ==
Skillings accepted a football scholarship from Ohio State University, to play under head coach Woody Hayes. As a freshman, he tore his right knee while playing on special teams. As a sophomore, he became a starter at safety and led the team with 6 interceptions (one returned for a touchdown).

As a junior, he was moved to cornerback and tied for second on the team with 3 interceptions. As a senior, he was tied for second on the team with 4 interceptions. At the time, his 13 career interceptions ranked fifth All-time in school history.

== Professional career ==
=== Dallas Cowboys ===
Skillings was selected by the Dallas Cowboys in the sixth round (163rd overall) of the 1981 NFL draft. He was released on August 18.

=== Montreal Alouettes ===
On August 31, 1981, he was signed by the Montreal Alouettes of the Canadian Football League. He spent a few weeks with the team before being cut.

=== Buffalo Bills ===
In 1982, he was signed as a free agent by the Buffalo Bills. He was released on August 23.

=== Montreal Concordes ===
In November 1982, he signed with the Montreal Concordes of the Canadian Football League. In 1983, he was limited while recovering from a broken ankle he suffered in the second preseason game against the Ottawa Rough Riders. On July 5, he was placed on the injured reserve list.

=== Los Angeles Raiders ===
On April 30, 1984, he was signed by the Los Angeles Raiders as a free agent. He was released before he start of the season.

== Coaching career ==
In 1996, he was named the offensive backs coach at California University of Pennsylvania. In 2017, he was named a coach at United Senior High School in East Wheatfield Township, Indiana County, Pennsylvania.
