= 1980 All-America college football team =

Official list of the best college football players of 1980

The 1980 All-America college football team is composed of college football players who were selected as All-Americans by various organizations that chose College Football All-America Teams in 1980.

The NCAA recognizes four selectors as "official" for the 1980 season. They are (1) the American Football Coaches Association (AFCA), (2) the Associated Press (AP), (3) the Football Writers Association of America (FWAA), and (4) the United Press International (UPI). The AP, UPI, and FWAA teams were selected by polling of sports writers and/or broadcasters. The AFCA team was based on a poll of coaches. Other notable selectors, though not recognized by the NCAA as official, included Football News, a national weekly football publication, the Newspaper Enterprise Association (NEA), The Sporting News (TSN), and the Walter Camp Football Foundation (WC).

Fourteen players were unanimous picks by all four official selectors. Seven of the unanimous picks were offensive players: (1) South Carolina running back and 1980 Heisman Trophy winner, George Rogers; (2) Georgia running back and 1982 Heisman Trophy winner, Herschel Walker; (3) Purdue quarterback and 1980 Sammy Baugh Trophy winner, Mark Herrmann; (4) Stanford wide receiver Ken Margerum; (5) Purdue tight end Dave Young; (6) Pittsburgh tackle Mark May; and (7) Notre Dame center John Scully. The seven unanimous picks on the defensive side were: (1) Pittsburgh defensive end Hugh Green, who won the 1980 Walter Camp Award, Maxwell Award, Lombardi Award, and Sporting News and UPI College Football Player of the Year awards; (2) Alabama defensive end E.J. Junior; (3) Houston defensive tackle Leonard Mitchell; (4) Baylor linebacker Mike Singletary; (5) North Carolina linebacker Lawrence Taylor; (6) UCLA defensive back Kenny Easley; and (7) USC defensive back Ronnie Lott.

In 1989, The New York Times published a follow-up on the 1980 AP All-America team. The article reported that 20 of the 22 first-team players went on to play in the NFL, with 13 still active and eight having received All-Pro honors.

== Offensive selections ==
=== Wide receivers ===
- Ken Margerum, Stanford (CFHOF) (AFCA, AP-1, FWAA, UPI-1, NEA-1, WC)
- Anthony Carter, Michigan (CFHOF) (AP-1, NEA-2, TSN)
- Cris Collinsworth, Florida (AP-2, UPI-2, NEA-1)
- Mardye McDole, Mississippi State (NEA-2, TSN)
- David Verser, Kansas (AP-2)
- Bobby Stewart, Texas Christian (AP-3)

=== Tight ends ===
- Dave Young, Purdue (AFCA, AP-1, FWAA, UPI-1, TSN, WC)
- Marvin Harvey, Southern Mississippi (NEA-1)
- Clay Brown, Brigham Young (AP-3, UPI-2)
- Benjie Pryor, Pitt (AP-2)
- Rodney Holman, Tulane (NEA-2)

=== Tackles ===
- Mark May, Pittsburgh (CFHOF) (AFCA, AP-1, FWAA, UPI-1, NEA-2 [guard], TSN, WC)
- Keith Van Horne, USC (AP-1, FWAA, UPI-1, NEA-1, TSN)
- Nick Eyre, BYU (AFCA, AP-3, FWAA, UPI-2 [guard], NEA-1)
- Bill Dugan, Penn St. (AFCA, AP-3)
- Ken Lanier, Florida State (AP-2)
- Curt Marsh, Washington (NEA-2)

=== Guards ===
- Randy Schleusener, Nebraska (AP-1, UPI-1, NEA-1, WC)
- Louis Oubre, Oklahoma (AFCA, AP-2 [tackle], FWAA, UPI-2 [tackle], NEA-2 [tackle], WC)
- Ron Wooten, North Carolina (AP-3, UPI-2, NEA-1, WC)
- Roy Foster, USC (UPI-1, NEA-2)
- Frank Ditta, Baylor (AP-1)
- Billy Ard, Wake Forest (TSN)
- Terry Crouch, Oklahoma (TSN)
- Sean Farrell, Penn State (AP-2)
- Joe Lukens, Ohio State (AP-2)
- Howard Richards, Missouri (UPI-2)
- Frank McCallister, Navy (AP-3)

=== Centers ===
- John Scully, Notre Dame (AFCA, AP-1, FWAA, UPI-1, NEA-1, TSN)
- George Lilja, Michigan (AP-3, UPI-2, NEA-2, WC)
- Rick Donnalley, North Carolina (AP-2)

=== Quarterbacks ===
- Mark Herrmann, Purdue (CFHOF) (AFCA [tie], AP-1, FWAA, UPI-1, WC)
- Jim McMahon, BYU (CFHOF) (AFCA [tie], AP-2, UPI-2)
- Art Schlichter, Ohio State (NEA-1)
- John Elway, Stanford (CFHOF) (AP-3, NEA-2, TSN)

=== Running backs ===
- George Rogers, South Carolina (CFHOF) (AFCA, AP-1, FWAA, UPI-1, NEA-1, TSN, WC)
- Herschel Walker, Georgia (CFHOF) (AFCA, AP-1, FWAA, UPI-1, NEA-1, TSN, WC)
- Jarvis Redwine, Nebraska (AFCA, UPI-1, WC)
- Freeman McNeil, UCLA (AP-2, FWAA, UPI-2, NEA-2)
- James Brooks, Auburn (AP-2, NEA-2)
- Walter Abercrombie, Baylor (AP-3)
- Marcus Allen, USC (CFHOF) (AP-3, UPI-2)
- Dwayne Crutchfield, Iowa State (UPI-2)
- Stump Mitchell, The Citadel (AP-3)

== Defensive selections ==
=== Defensive ends ===
- Hugh Green, Pittsburgh (CFHOF) (AFCA, AP-1, FWAA, UPI-1, NEA-1, TSN, WC)
- E.J. Junior, Alabama (AFCA, AP-1 [LB], FWAA, UPI-1, NEA-1, TSN, WC)
- Scott Zettek, Notre Dame (AP-1)
- Derrie Nelson, Nebraska (AP-2, FWAA, UPI-2, NEA-2)
- Don Blackmon, Tulsa (AP-2)
- Lyman White, LSU (NEA-2)
- Rich Dixon, California (AP-3)
- Rickey Jackson, Pittsburgh (AP-3, UPI-2)

=== Defensive tackles ===
- Leonard Mitchell, Houston (AFCA, AP-1, UPI-1, NEA-1, TSN, WC)
- Kenneth Sims, Texas (CFHOF) (AP-1, FWAA, UPI-1, NEA-1, TSN)
- Hosea Taylor, Houston (FWAA, WC, NEA-2 [NG])
- Vince Goldsmith, Oregon (AP-2, UPI-2, NEA-2)
- Mike Trgovac, Michigan (AP-2)
- John Harty, Iowa (UPI-2, NEA-2)
- Calvin Clark, Purdue (AP-3)
- Elvin Keller, West Texas State (AP-3)

=== Middle guards ===
- Ron Simmons, Florida State (CFHOF) (AFCA, UPI-1, WC)
- Jim Burt, Miami (Fla.) (NEA-1)
- Stan Gardner, Kansas (UPI-2)

=== Linebackers ===
- Mike Singletary, Baylor (CFHOF) (AFCA, AP-1, FWAA, UPI-1, NEA-1, TSN, WC)
- Lawrence Taylor, North Carolina (AFCA, AP-1, FWAA, UPI-1, NEA-2, TSN)
- Bob Crable, Notre Dame (CFHOF) (AFCA, AP-2, UPI-1, NEA-1, TSN, WC)
- David Little, Florida (AP-1, FWAA, UPI-2, FN, NEA-2)
- Tom Boyd, Alabama (AP-3, UPI-2, WC)
- Marcus Marek, Ohio State (AP-3, UPI-2)
- Andy Cannavino, Michigan (AP-2)
- Reggie Herring, Florida State (AP-2)
- Ricky Young, Oklahoma State (AP-2)
- Chip Banks, USC (AP-3)

=== Defensive backs ===
- Kenny Easley, UCLA (CFHOF) (AFCA, AP-1, FWAA, UPI-1, NEA-1, TSN, WC)
- Ronnie Lott, USC (CFHOF) (AFCA, AP-1, FWAA, UPI-1, NEA-1, TSN, WC)
- John Simmons, SMU (AFCA, AP-1, FWAA, UPI-2)
- Scott Woerner, Georgia (CFHOF) (AFCA, AP-2, UPI-1, NEA-2, WC)
- Bobby Butler, Florida State (AP-3, NEA-1)
- Bill Whitaker, Missouri (NEA-1)
- Ted Watts, Texas Tech (NEA-2, TSN)
- Hanford Dixon, Southern Mississippi (TSN)
- Tim Wilbur, Indiana (AP-2)
- Tommy Wilcox, Alabama (AP-2)
- Todd Bell, Ohio State (UPI-2, NEA-2)
- Jeff Hipp, Georgia (UPI-2)
- Jeff Griffin, Utah (NEA-2)
- Vann McElroy, Baylor (AP-3)
- Dennis Smith, USC (AP-3)

== Special teams ==
=== Kickers ===
- Rex Robinson, Georgia (FWAA, UPI-1, NEA-1, WC)
- Bill Capece, Florida State (UPI-2, TSN)
- Obed Ariri, Clemson (NEA-2)

=== Punters ===
- Rohn Stark, Florida State (FWAA, UPI-1, NEA-2, TSN)
- Ray Stachowicz, Michigan State (UPI-2, NEA-1, WC)

== Key ==
- **Bold** – Consensus All-American
- -1 – First-team selection
- -2 – Second-team selection
- -3 – Third-team selection

=== Official selectors ===
- AFCA = American Football Coaches Association
- AP = Associated Press
- FWAA = Football Writers Association of America
- UPI = United Press International

=== Unofficial selectors ===
- FN = Football News
- NEA = Newspaper Enterprise Association
- TSN = The Sporting News
- WC = Walter Camp Football Foundation

== See also ==
- 1980 All-Atlantic Coast Conference football team
- 1980 All-Big Eight Conference football team
- 1980 All-Big Ten Conference football team
- 1980 All-Pacific-10 Conference football team
- 1980 All-SEC football team
