= Ed Muransky =

American football player (born 1960)

No. 76, 72
- Position: Offensive tackle

Personal information
- Born: January 20, 1960 (age 66); Youngstown, Ohio, U.S.
- Listed height: 6 ft 7 in (2.01 m)
- Listed weight: 277 lb (126 kg)

Career information
- High school: Cardinal Mooney (Youngstown)
- College: Michigan
- NFL draft: 1982: 4th round, 82nd overall pick

Career history
- Los Angeles Raiders (1982–1984); Orlando Renegades (1985); San Francisco 49ers (1987)*
- * Offseason or practice squad member only

Awards and highlights
- Super Bowl champion (XVIII); Consensus All-American (1981); 2× First-team All-Big Ten (1980, 1981)

Career NFL statistics
- Games played: 24
- Stats at Pro Football Reference

Edward William Muransky (born January 20, 1960) is an American former professional football player who was an offensive tackle for the Los Angeles Raiders of the National Football League (NFL) and Orlando Renegades of the United States Football League (USFL). He was a member of the Super Bowl XVIII-champion Raiders. Prior to this, he was an All-American and Academic All-American athlete while playing college football for the Michigan Wolverines during the 1979 through 1981 seasons.

After retiring from football he became a business partner and advisor to Edward J. DeBartolo Jr., former San Francisco 49ers owner. Muransky testified in the March 2000 trial of Louisiana Governor Edwin Edwards, mainly about what DeBartolo had confided to Muransky. DeBartolo was the only extortion victim who claimed to have been extorted directly by Edwards, but Muransky could not provide direct testimony about private meetings between DeBartolo and Edwards. Muransky has continued to pursue business interests even after the controversies about DeBartolo have waned.

== Cardinal Mooney High School ==
Born in Youngstown, Muransky played football for Cardinal Mooney High School where he was affectionately known as "Big Ed" by family and teammates. He was a three-year varsity letterman and two-year starter as an interior lineman at Cardinal Mooney. In 1976, he won All-Steel Valley, All-NEO, and All-State honors, and received the Mack Truck Award, given annually to the most outstanding high school lineman in the Youngstown area.

== University of Michigan ==
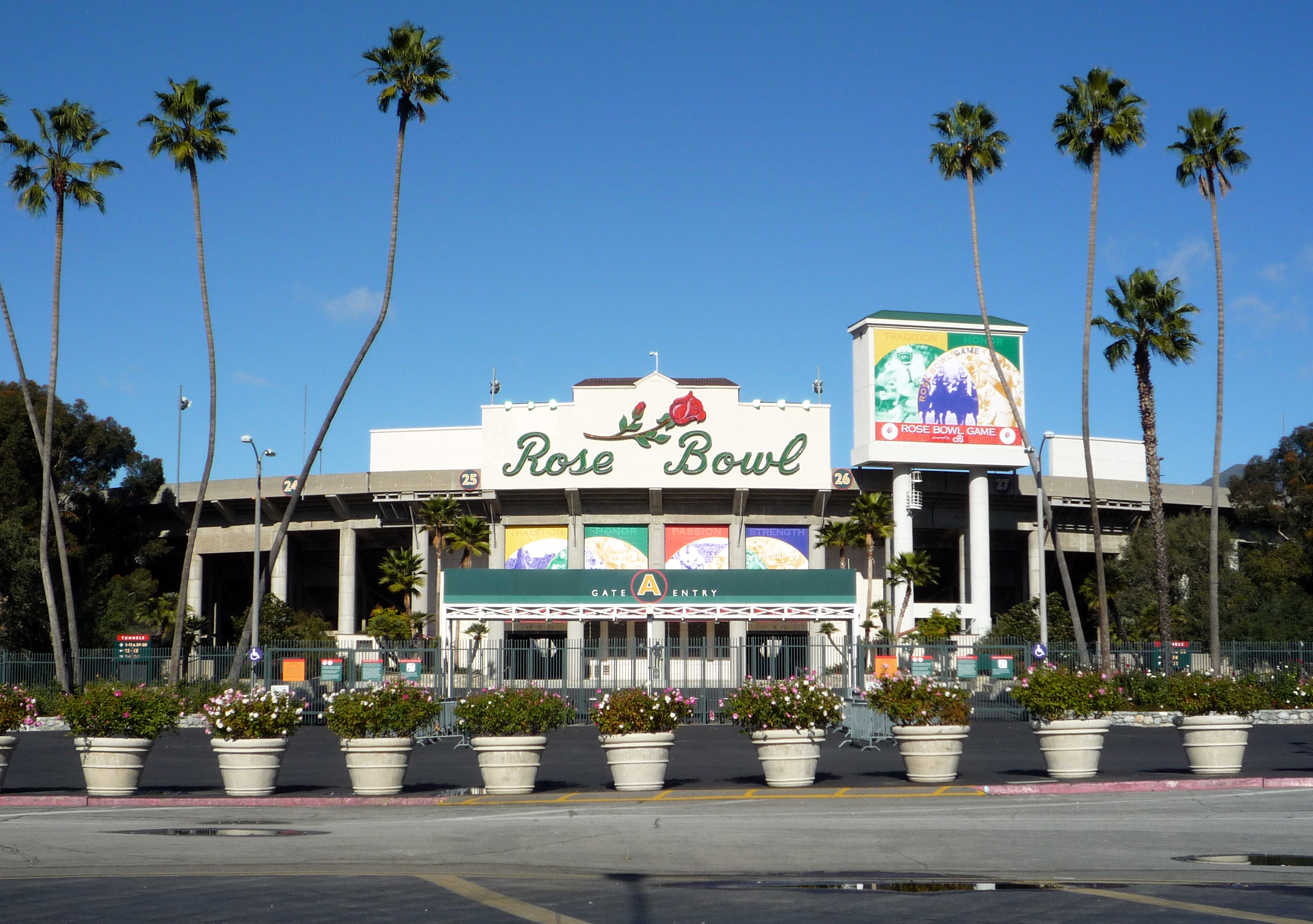
Muransky carried Bo Schembechler off the field after the 1981 Rose Bowl.

Highly recruited by numerous "blue chip" schools, Muransky chose to play collegiate football at the University of Michigan. He lettered for three years at Michigan, where he wore #72, and earned All-Big Ten honors in 1980 and 1981. Muransky started 33 straight games at offensive tackle for the Wolverines from his sophomore through senior years, 1979–1981. The 6-foot-7-inch (2.01 m), 320-pound (150 kg; 23 st) lineman was a key member of the 1980 Wolverines, coach Bo Schembechler's first bowl-winning team. In fact, he started all twelve games at right tackle. This includes the 1981 Rose Bowl against the Washington Huskies football team won by Michigan 23–6. The game was Schembechler's first bowl victory, and the coach was carried off the field on Muransky's shoulders. Muransky was named to the Associated Press, UPI, and The Sporting News All-American teams in 1981 and also garnered "Academic All-American" his senior year. He was part of a 1981 team that had five All-American honorees (Anthony Carter, Butch Woolfolk, Bubba Paris and Kurt Becker).

=== "Beef Bowl" Record Holder ===
Muransky also set the all-time "Beef Bowl" record by consuming 8 pounds (3.63 kg) of prime rib at Lawry's before the 1979 Rose Bowl. Muransky later recalled: "Bubba Paris and I were two happy freshmen eating together at the Lawry's Beef Bowl event before the 1979 Rose Bowl Game. After we had enjoyed our fourth plate of prime rib, mashed potatoes, corn and Yorkshire pudding, Bubba asked what the record was, and they said 7 cuts. Bubba continued for 3 more cuts, and I continued for four, totally under the Bo Schembechler radar screen. When they delivered the 8th cut to me, the media started to gather around my table, Bo walked by and let me know what he was thinking without ever saying a word. Afterward, a Paris-Muransky night out ended with some pizza. The next morning in practice, Bo made an example of Bubba and me. We never ran so much in our lives as we did that day. We were in every play of scrimmage and then we ran sprints." When the Wolverines returned to Pasadena for the 1981 Rose Bowl, "Bo made it a point to come to the back of the plane and talk to me and Bubba Paris. He wanted to let us know that my record from a couple years earlier would not be in jeopardy because we were going to be sitting with him at the Lawry's Beef Bowl. He said he was going to limit each of us to two cuts of prime rib." Schembechler had his own take on the story: "I let 'em eat because they were freshmen. They weren't gonna play anyway."

=== Big Chill Cameo ===
Muransky is also remembered for a cameo appearance in the 1983 film The Big Chill: "I was in the theater watching it, not knowing what was going to happen. It was kind of interesting with all of (the characters) watching (the 1980 Michigan-Michigan State game). It was pretty cool. Watching [quarterback] John Wangler go back was pretty cool. For a split-second as they're going back, I'm thinking to myself, 'Oh my God, I pray to God I'm not holding or I missed a block for a sack or something on the big screen pass.' But it was a good block, and it was a fun moment. Any time I hear 'The Big Chill,' it's good memories."

=== Quitters ===
The Wolverines were the unanimous pre-season Number 1 pick in 1981 but lost their opener to Wisconsin 21–14. In the team meeting the next day, Schembechler walked into the room and wrote "Ed Muransky" and "Stan Edwards" on the chalkboard, and then barked out, "The rest of you are quitters. I want nothing more to do with you," and left. According to the coach, Muransky and Edwards were the only two who played with intensity against Wisconsin, and Bo left it to them to motivate the rest of the team. Muransky issued a challenge to the offense on the night before the following week's game: "I looked at everyone and said, 'If we continue to play as great individuals, we'll continue to lose. If we start to play as a great team, we'll start winning." The next day, the Wolverines beat #1 ranked Notre Dame, 25–7.

== Professional football career ==
=== Los Angeles Raiders ===
Muransky was selected in the fourth round (82nd pick) by the Oakland Raiders in the 1982 NFL Draft, and he played in 24 games for the Raiders from 1982–1984. The Raiders moved from Oakland to Los Angeles to play the 1982 NFL season. Thus, although he was selected by the Oakland Raiders, he played his NFL career with the Los Angeles Raiders. In his second season in the NFL, he won a Super Bowl ring with the Raiders' 1983 Super Bowl Championship team. He played all 16 regular season games for Tom Flores' Raiders that season. The team went 12–4 during the 1983 NFL season and produced eight Pro Bowlers. Muransky played for an offensive line that included Pro Bowlers Henry Lawrence and Todd Christensen. The team was led that season by quarterback Jim Plunkett and future Hall of Famer Marcus Allen, who rushed for nine touchdowns, caught two and threw three on a 4–7 passing performance. Muransky described the Super Bowl experience as a "whirlwind" with "two weeks of hype like you've never seen." He recalled: "It was a big deal because offensive linemen weren't making what they make today. That year, I made $77,000, which was a pretty decent contract at the time. But if you won the Super Bowl, you won $64,000. So it wasn't peanuts. I remember walking off the field after that, thinking to myself, 'I have a Super Bowl ring for the rest of my life.'" Although Muransky was cut in for a Super Bowl gameshare, he was not on the official gameday roster.

Although the Raiders only won one Super Bowl with Muransky, they had great success. In his rookie season, they were 8–1 in the strike-shortened season. This was the best record in the American Football Conference and tied for the best in the League. The team, however, was upset by the 6–3 New York Jets in the second round of the 1982-83 NFL Playoffs. The 1984 Raiders went 11–-5 and also made the 1984-85 NFL playoffs. The Raiders teams of Muransky's years went 31–10 in the regular season and 4–2 in the playoffs under Flores.

=== USFL Orlando Renegades ===
After playing for the Raiders, Muransky signed with the Orlando Renegades of the USFL. He played and started 14 of the Renegades 18 games under Lee Corso. The team was not as successful as the Raiders and went 5–13. When the league folded, he decided to retire and enter the business world.

== Business career ==
After his football career ended, Muransky worked briefly as a sportscaster at WYTV in Youngstown. He later became CEO and chairman of Gallagher Pipino, Inc and the Muransky companies. He is married to the former Christine Pipino and has three children: Eddie, Deloran and Donielle.

=== Work with Eddie DeBartolo and the Edwards trial ===
In the late 1990s and early 2000s, Muransky became the most trusted advisor and business partner of Edward J. DeBartolo Jr., heir to a real estate empire and former owner of the San Francisco 49ers. For a time, Muransky was the CEO of the DeBartolo Property Group, and the two partnered in numerous business ventures. DeBartolo ventured into the casino business against the wishes of his sister, Denise DeBartolo York and hired family contact, Muransky to head DeBartolo Entertainment. Eventually, Muransky who is said to have a keen business sense, became DeBartolo's most trusted advisor, which caused a rift with Carmen Policy, 49ers president.

In 1997, Muransky became involved in DeBartolo's efforts to open a riverboat gambling casino in Louisiana. The project required approval of the state gambling board and resulted in a highly publicized bribery scandal that ended with the conviction of former Louisiana Governor Edwin Edwards on 17 counts, including racketeering, extortion, mail fraud, and wire fraud. In order to secure licensing of the casino, Edwards and associates allegedly solicited bribes from DeBartolo, including a briefcase filled with $400,000. Of the many who claimed that they were extortion victims, DeBartolo was the only one who claimed to have been extorted directly by Edwards. Muransky was able to describe his relationship with DeBartolo but could not provide testimony about private meetings between DeBartolo and Edwards.

=== Post-trial business ===
DeBartolo had Muransky placed on the board of directors of the DeBartolo Corporation after reaching a plea agreement which left him (DeBartolo) a convicted felon and precluded him from serving on the corporate board. Eventually, after DeBartolo became involved in the corruption, he turned over control of the 49ers to his sister. DeBartolo and Muransky reportedly went through an acrimonious breakup in 2002. Following the break with DeBartolo, Muransky moved with his family back to Youngstown.

In 2007, Muransky, as owner of Muransky Co. and Southwoods Surgical Center in Boardman, Ohio, filed for monetary damages and dissolution of a joint venture intended to open a full-service, for-profit hospital in southern Mahoning County. Muransky told The Vindicator: "I'm very disappointed for this community. There was an absolute opportunity to grow the health system ... In a few years, we are going to find ourselves having to drive to Akron and Pittsburgh and Cleveland for health care because it is no longer available here. I'm dumbfounded it has come to this." Muransky said one of the reasons he came back to Youngstown was to use his skills to give back to the community.

Ed also serves as Founder, Chairman and CEO of Chestnut Land Company, the holding company for Auntie Anne's Soft Pretzel franchises operating throughout the United States. He successfully operates almost 70 stores under this franchise name, with locations in 15 states.
