= Todd Bell =

American football player (1958–2005)

No. 25, 52, 49
- Positions: Safety, linebacker

Personal information
- Born: November 28, 1958; Dayton, Ohio, U.S.
- Died: March 16, 2005 (aged 46); Reynoldsburg, Ohio, U.S.
- Listed height: 6 ft 1 in (1.85 m)
- Listed weight: 207 lb (94 kg)

Career information
- High school: Middletown (Middletown, Ohio)
- College: Ohio State (1977–1980)
- NFL draft: 1981: 4th round, 95th overall pick

Career history
- Chicago Bears (1981–1984, 1986–1987); Philadelphia Eagles (1988–1989)

Awards and highlights
- Second-team All-Pro (1984); Pro Bowl (1984); Second-team All-American (1980); 2× First-team All-Big Ten (1979, 1980)

Career NFL statistics
- Interceptions: 7
- Sacks: 10
- Fumble recoveries: 8
- Stats at Pro Football Reference

Todd Anthony Bell (November 28, 1958 – March 16, 2005) was an American professional football player who was a safety for the Chicago Bears of the National Football League (NFL) during the early 1980s. He played college football for the Ohio State Buckeyes.

== College ==
After graduating from Middletown High School, in Middletown, Ohio, Bell was given a scholarship to play for Ohio State University. He was a four-year starter at defensive back, playing as a roverback, a hybrid of the strong safety and linebacker positions. His biggest moment at Ohio State was a game-winning touchdown in his junior year against rival Michigan on November 17, 1979. After Ohio State linebacker Jim Laughlin blocked a punt by Michigan's Brian Virgil, Bell scooped up the football and ran it in 18 yards for a final score of 18–15. Winning the game sent Ohio State to the 1980 Rose Bowl and gave them a chance at the national championship.

== Professional career ==
Bell was selected in the fourth round of the 1981 NFL draft by the Chicago Bears. He played with the Bears from 1981 to 1984, earning a Pro Bowl nomination in his fourth year. Bell was known on the team for his hits on opposing team players, and for his off-the-field reputation as a prankster. Bell sat out the entire 1985 season due to a contract dispute with the team – and missed being part of one of the most dominating Super Bowl teams of all time. His replacement, Dave Duerson, also went on to be selected for the Pro Bowl that year.

Bell returned in 1986, but a hamstring injury and the contract dispute still lingered over his tenure with the Bears, and he signed a free agent contract with the Philadelphia Eagles in the off-season in 1988. The Eagles converted him from strong safety to linebacker, and he played two years with the Eagles before he broke his leg in a 27–13 loss to the Chicago Bears on Monday Night Football on October 2, 1989, which prematurely ended his career.

== Death ==
On March 16, 2005, Bell suffered a fatal heart attack while driving his car in Reynoldsburg, Ohio.

== Todd Anthony Bell National Resource Center on the African American Male ==
In 1997, Bell returned to Ohio State University to accept a position as Coordinator of the Minority Continuing Education Opportunities Program in the Office of Continuing Education, then lodged in University College. There he worked with Dean Mac Stewart to give leadership to outreach with the central Ohio community. He fostered cooperation with local businesses to provide funding for their employees to start or return to college studies at OSU. He also worked with the personnel of local Boys & Girls Clubs to develop joint ventures to improve the environment of the neighborhoods near the central campus. In 2001, he moved to the Office of Minority Affairs where he coordinated a broad range of community-university programs. Notably, on campus he gave initial leadership to the development of the Black Male Initiative to improve the campus environment, academic achievement, and leadership development of African American males at The Ohio State University and he was part of the team that developed the African American Male Resource Center. When Bell died in 2005, the center was renamed to The Todd Anthony Bell National Resource Center on the African American Male to honor his work at the university and with African American male students.
