= Mike Trgovac =

American football player and coach (born 1959)

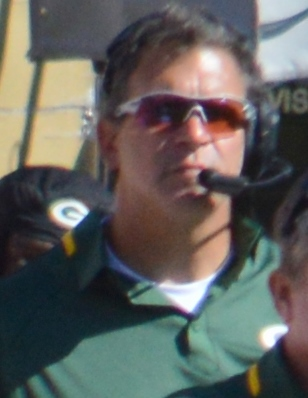
- Trgovac in 2013

Personal information
- Born: February 27, 1959 (age 67); Youngstown, Ohio, U.S.

Career information
- High school: Austintown (OH) Fitch
- College: Michigan

Career history
- Michigan (1984–1985) Graduate assistant; Ball State (1986–1988) Defensive line coach; Navy (1989) Defensive line coach; Colorado State (1990–1991) Defensive line coach; Notre Dame (1992–1994) Defensive line coach; Philadelphia Eagles (1995–1998) Defensive line coach; Green Bay Packers (1999) Defensive line coach; Washington Redskins (2000–2001) Defensive line coach; Carolina Panthers (2002) Defensive line coach; Carolina Panthers (2003–2008) Defensive coordinator; Green Bay Packers (2009–2017) Defensive line coach; Oakland Raiders (2018) Defensive line coach; Oakland Raiders (2019) Senior defensive assistant

Awards and highlights
- Super Bowl champion (XLV); Second-team All-American (1980); 2× First-team All-Big Ten (1979, 1980)
- Coaching profile at Pro Football Reference

Michael John Trgovac (/ˈtɜːrɡəvæk/ TUR-gə-vak; born February 27, 1959) is an American football coach and a former player. He previously served as the defensive line coach for the Green Bay Packers, Carolina Panthers, Washington Redskins, and Philadelphia Eagles and Las Vegas Raiders. Trgovac was a member of the Packers' coaching staff that led the team to the NFL championship in Super Bowl XLV in 2011. Born in Youngstown, Ohio, Trgovac played college football as a middle guard for the University of Michigan from 1977 to 1980. He received All-Big Ten Conference honors in both 1979 and 1980. After graduating from Michigan, Trgovac held various college coaching positions from 1984 to 1994.

== Early life ==
Trgovac was born in Youngstown, Ohio, in 1958. He became an all-state defensive lineman at Fitch High School in Austintown, Ohio. He was named defensive lineman of the year in 1976 and also won the state wrestling title. He is of Croatian ancestry and his surname means "Trader" in the Croatian language.

== Playing career ==
Trgovac enrolled at the University of Michigan in 1977 and played college football at the middle guard position for Bo Schembechler's Michigan Wolverines football teams from 1977 to 1980. As a sophomore in 1978, he started six games for the Wolverines and received the John F. Maulbetsch Award (presented to a football underclassman for desire, character, capacity for leadership and future success both on and off the football field).

As a junior, Trgovac started 11 games at middle guard for the 1979 Michigan team, won the Frederick Matthei Award, and was selected as a first-team player on the 1979 All-Big Ten Conference football team.

As a senior, Trgovac again started 11 of 12 games at middle guard for the 1980 Michigan Wolverines football team that compiled a 10-2 record, finished #4 in the AP and UPI polls, and outscored opponents 322 to 129. Trgovac was selected as a first-team All-Big Ten player for the second consecutive year.

== Coaching career ==
=== College ===
Following his graduation from Michigan, Trgovac became a graduate assistant under Schembechler in the 1984 and 1985 seasons with fellow GAs Cam Cameron and Bill Sheridan. From 1986 to 1988 he coached the defensive line at Ball State. Following a one-year stint with Navy, he joined former Ohio State coach Earle Bruce's staff at Colorado State as defensive line coach. He ended his college coaching career with three seasons on Lou Holtz's staff at Notre Dame.

=== Philadelphia Eagles ===
Trgovac served as the defensive line coach for the Philadelphia Eagles from 1995 to 1998. In 1998, the Eagles finished third in the NFL in sack percentage and first overall against the pass. Trgovac's 1995 line recorded an NFL-best 42.5 sacks.

=== Green Bay Packers ===
Trgovac was hired as a defensive line coach by the Green Bay Packers. He only spent one season with them.

=== Washington Redskins ===
In 2000, Trgovac was hired by the Washington Redskins. He served as their defensive line coach for two seasons. He helped guide a Redskins defense that ranked fourth in the NFL and first in the NFC in 2000.

=== Carolina Panthers ===
Following the 2001 season, Trgovac joined the Carolina Panthers. He was promoted to defensive coordinator for the 2003 season. Since Trgovac joined Carolina in 2002, the Panthers rank fifth in total yards allowed, trailing only the Tampa Bay Buccaneers, Pittsburgh Steelers, Baltimore Ravens and Denver Broncos. They were also sixth in first downs allowed and rushing yards allowed per attempt, ninth in rushing yards allowed per game and 10th in third down efficiency. After turning down a contract offer from the Panthers, Trgovac informed Head Coach John Fox and General Manager Marty Hurney that he was leaving the team.

=== Return to Green Bay ===
In 2009, Trgovac returned to the Green Bay Packers as their defensive line coach. He was let go along with several other Green Bay defensive assistants following the 2017 season.

=== Oakland / Las Vegas Raiders ===
On January 18, 2018, Trgovac was hired by the Oakland Raiders as their defensive line coach. In January 2019, it was announced that he had been replaced by Brentson Buckner. Subsequently, Trgovac became the Raiders' senior defensive assistant.
