= Ray Stachowicz =

American football player (born 1959)

No. 16, 19, 15
- Position: Punter

Personal information
- Born: March 6, 1959 (age 67); Cleveland, Ohio, U.S.
- Listed height: 5 ft 11 in (1.80 m)
- Listed weight: 185 lb (84 kg)

Career information
- High school: Brecksville (Broadview Heights, Ohio)
- College: Michigan State
- NFL draft: 1981: 3rd round, 62nd overall pick

Career history
- Green Bay Packers (1981–1983); Detroit Lions (1983)*; Chicago Bears (1983-1984); Detroit Lions (1985)
- * Offseason or practice squad member only

Awards and highlights
- Second-team All-American (1980); 4× First-team All-Big Ten (1977, 1978, 1979, 1980)

Career NFL statistics
- Punts: 136
- Punting yards: 5,464
- Punting average: 40.2
- Stats at Pro Football Reference

Raymond Mark Stachowicz (born March 6, 1959) is an American former professional football player who was a punter in the National Football League (NFL). Stachowicz was selected 62nd overall in the third round by the Green Bay Packers out of Michigan State University in the 1981 NFL draft. Stachowicz is of Polish descent.
