= Mel Owens =

American football player (born 1958)

No. 58
- Position: Linebacker

Personal information
- Born: December 7, 1958 (age 67); Detroit, Michigan, U.S.
- Listed height: 6 ft 2 in (1.88 m)
- Listed weight: 224 lb (102 kg)

Career information
- High school: DeKalb (DeKalb, Illinois)
- College: Michigan (1976–1980)
- NFL draft: 1981: 1st round, 9th overall pick

Career history
- Los Angeles Rams (1981–1989)

Awards and highlights
- First-team All-Big Ten (1980); Second-team All-Big Ten (1979)

Career NFL statistics
- Tackles: 453
- Sacks: 26.5
- Fumble recoveries: 9
- Interceptions: 4
- Stats at Pro Football Reference

Mel Tyrae Owens (born December 7, 1958) is an American former professional football player who was a linebacker for the Los Angeles Rams of the National Football League (NFL). He played college football at the University of Michigan from 1976 to 1980. He was selected by the Los Angeles Rams in the first round (ninth overall pick) of the 1981 NFL draft. He played nine seasons with the Rams and compiled 26.5 quarterback sacks. Owens later became a sports lawyer in Laguna Hills, California.

== Early life ==
Owens was born in Detroit, Michigan, in 1958. His father Walter Owens played professional baseball in the mid-1950s for the Detroit Stars of the Negro American League and later coached high school baseball in Detroit. The family moved to DeKalb, Illinois, when Mel was in the ninth grade, as his father was hired as the baseball coach at Northern Illinois University. Mel attended DeKalb High School where he was a multi-sport star, winning a total of nine varsity letters in football, basketball, and baseball. He played at the fullback and linebacker positions for the football team, gaining almost 1,000 yards one year, and at forward for the basketball team.

As a junior in 1975, Owens was selected as the basketball team's most valuable player after tallying 254 rebounds (11.5 per game) and 329 points (14.9 per game). He won unanimous all-conference basketball honors as a senior after leading the team in both scoring (352 points) and rebounds (263).

== University of Michigan ==
Owens enrolled at the University of Michigan in 1976. He played college football for Bo Schembechler's Michigan Wolverines football teams from 1976 to 1980. As a true freshman in 1976, Owens moved from strong safety to outside linebacker to inside linebacker. As a sophomore, he played principally as a backup to Jerry Meter. He gained note, however, for personally stopping two fourth-down plays in the fourth quarter against Ohio State to help the 1977 Michigan team win the Big Ten Conference championship and advance to the Rose Bowl.

As a junior, he started the first two games of the season at inside linebacker for the 1978 Michigan Wolverines football team, but he was injured in the second game against Notre Dame.

As a redshirt junior, Owens started all 12 games at outside linebacker for the 1979 Michigan Wolverines football team. That year, he had 42 tackles and 26 assists. He starred in the Michigan State game, hitting Spartan quarterback Bert Vaughan and forcing an errant pass that was intercepted by Michael Harden. Later in the same game, he recovered a Michigan State fumble at midfield.

As a senior, Owens started 11 of 12 games at outside linebacker for the 1980 Michigan Wolverines football team that compiled a 10–2 record, finished No. 4 in the AP and UPI polls, and outscored opponents 322 to 129. During the 1980 season, Owens tallied 52 solo tackles, 37 assists, and an interception. He was selected as a first-team All-Big Ten Conference player in 1980.

Owens concluded his collegiate career with 125 solo tackles, 79 assists, and three interceptions. He played in the 1978 and 1981 Rose Bowls and the 1979 Gator Bowl while at Michigan. He graduated with a bachelor's degree in political science.

== Los Angeles Rams ==
The Los Angeles Rams selected Owens with the ninth overall pick in the 1981 NFL draft. After a brief holdout, Owens in late July 1981 signed a three year contract worth $175,000 per season. His reported time in the 40-yard dash was 4.65, and his bench press was 390 pounds.

He played mostly on special teams in 1981 and 1982. He made his first start against the Los Angeles Raiders in the second-to-last game of the 1982 NFL season in which he recorded 10 tackles before leaving the game with a knee injury. The injury caused him to miss the last two weeks of the season. Owens became a full-time starter in 1983, when the Rams switched to a 3-4 defense. That season, he was fifth on the Rams defense with 83 tackles. He also had four sacks. In 1984, he was third in tackles with 79 and 3.5 sacks and an interception along with three fumbles recovered and a forced fumble. The following season, 1985, he was sixth in tackles with 68 (five for a loss) and also contributed nine sacks, third on the team. In 1986, Owens was an honorable mention All-Pro by the Associated Press as the Rams defense ranked in the NFL's top five for the second consecutive season. In the third week of the 1986 season, Owens was named the NFC Defensive Player of the Week by the NFL.

Owens started every non-strike game from 1983 through 1987. In 1988, he suffered an ankle injury that limited him to seven games (four starts). In 1989, he was switched to inside linebacker, after spending his entire NFL career at strong outside linebacker. He played all 16 games with 10 starts. Owens totaled 453 tackles with 26.5 sacks in his Ram career with four interceptions.

== Personal and post-football career ==
During his time with the Rams, Owens was involved in several business ventures in Los Angeles, including a line of clothing called "Evolution Wear". In the 1980s, he operated a nationwide restaurant reservation hotline called 1-800-LETS-EAT. He traveled to Egypt in the 1984 off-season. In the 1987 off-season, he ran with the bulls in Pamplona, Spain, and competed in the 1987 Los Angeles Marathon.

According to a 1984 Los Angeles Times profile, Owens practiced the development of extrasensory perception (ESP), "a talent he became aware of as a child."

Following his time as an NFL player, Owens passed the Series 7 exam and worked as a financial advisor at Merrill Lynch & Co. He later attended University of California, Hastings College of the Law earning a Juris Doctor (JD). He was admitted to the State Bar of California in 2003. In 2006, he became a founding partner of Namanny, Byrne & Owens in Laguna Hills, California. He specializes in workers' compensation, sports law, sports injuries and disability benefits.

Owens was one of the lead attorneys in a 2013 brain-injury lawsuit by professional ice hockey players against the National Hockey League (NHL).

Owens represented more than 250 football players in workers compensation claims arising out of football-related injuries.

Owens serves as an advisor to the Center for Sport and the Law at the University of Baltimore School of Law.

Owens gained recognition as No. 28 in The Hockey News’ Top 100 People of Power & Influence, in the sport, in the January 20, 2014 issue.

Beyond his legal profession, Owens is a lecturer and speaker in various realms, including Athlete Workers’ Compensation, Sports Management, Sports Law, Sports Injuries, and Disability Benefits. He contributes to the prep sports community as a football coach at Santa Margarita Catholic High School (Rancho Santa Margarita, California), where he has imparted his knowledge through a dedicated class on Sports Management. Owens is a SAG-AFTRA member and an avid photographer.

In May 2002, Owens married Brazilian-born businesswoman Fabiana Pimentel. They have two sons and resided in California during their marriage. Pimentel filed for divorce in February 2020, citing irreconcilable differences, and the divorce was finalized in December 2024.

In April 2025, ABC announced that Owens would star in season 2 of its reality dating show The Golden Bachelor.
