= John Harty (American football) =

American football player (born 1958)

No. 75
- Positions: Defensive tackle, defensive end

Personal information
- Born: December 17, 1958 (age 67); Sioux City, Iowa, U.S.
- Listed height: 6 ft 4 in (1.93 m)
- Listed weight: 260 lb (118 kg)

Career information
- High school: Bishop Heelan Catholic (Sioux City)
- College: Iowa
- NFL draft: 1981: 2nd round, 36th overall pick

Career history
- San Francisco 49ers (1981–1986)

Awards and highlights
- 2× Super Bowl champion (XVI, XIX); Second-team All-American (1980); First-team All-Big Ten (1980); Second-team All-Big Ten (1977)

Career NFL statistics
- Sacks: 3
- Safeties: 1
- Stats at Pro Football Reference

John Daniel Harty (born December 17, 1958) is an American former professional football player who was a defensive tackle in the National Football League (NFL). Harty was selected in the second round by the San Francisco 49ers out of the University of Iowa in the 1981 NFL draft.

After he retired from the sport, he completed his bachelor degree and became a businessman, including the presidency of Westmar University in the late 1990s.
