= Dave Young (American football) =

American football player (1959–2023)

No. 89, 86, 81
- Position: Tight end

Personal information
- Born: February 9, 1959; Akron, Ohio, U.S.
- Died: November 21, 2023 (aged 64)
- Listed height: 6 ft 5 in (1.96 m)
- Listed weight: 242 lb (110 kg)

Career information
- High school: East (Akron)
- College: Purdue
- NFL draft: 1981: 2nd round, 32nd overall pick

Career history
- New York Giants (1981); New England Patriots (1982)*; Buffalo Bills (1983); Baltimore Colts / Indianapolis Colts (1983-1984)
- * Offseason or practice squad member only

Awards and highlights
- Unanimous All-American (1980); Second-team All-American (1979); 2× First-team All-Big Ten (1979, 1980)

Career NFL statistics
- Receptions: 19
- Receiving yards: 213
- Receiving touchdowns: 3
- Stats at Pro Football Reference

David Joseph Young (February 9, 1959 – November 21, 2023) was an American professional football player who was a tight end in the National Football League (NFL). He played a college football for the Purdue Boilermakers. He was selected by the New York Giants in the second round of the 1981 NFL draft. Young also played for the Buffalo Bills and Baltimore Colts / Indianapolis Colts. He died on November 21, 2023, at the age of 64.
