= Doug Donley =

American football player (born 1959)

No. 83
- Position: Wide receiver

Personal information
- Born: February 6, 1959 (age 67); Cambridge, Ohio, U.S.
- Listed height: 6 ft 0 in (1.83 m)
- Listed weight: 175 lb (79 kg)

Career information
- High school: Cambridge (OH)
- College: Ohio State
- NFL draft: 1981: 2nd round, 53rd overall pick

Career history
- Dallas Cowboys (1981–1984); Chicago Bears (1986)

Awards and highlights
- 2× First-team All-Big Ten (1979, 1980)

Career NFL statistics
- Games played: 43
- Receptions: 55
- Receiving yards: 898
- Touchdowns: 4
- Stats at Pro Football Reference

Douglas Max Donley (born February 6, 1959) is an American former professional football player who was a wide receiver in the National Football League (NFL) for the Dallas Cowboys and Chicago Bears. He was selected in the second round of the 1981 NFL draft. He played college football at Ohio State University.

== Early life ==
Donley attended Cambridge High School (Class of 1977), where he was a three-sport standout in football, track and basketball, earning the nickname 'White Lightning' for his blazing speed.

On the gridiron, Donley was a three-year letterman at running back for the Bobcats, finishing with a career total of 2,572 rushing yards. He also had 226 yards receiving and 1,028 yards in kick returns for a career all-purpose yardage total of 3,826 yards to go with 31 touchdowns. He dislocated his right shoulder multiple times and had it operated as a junior. He received All-state honors as a senior.

In track, Donley won the OVAC Class 4-A championship in the long jump as a junior (1976) with a leap of 21 ft. 2.5 in. and was a double-winner at the conference meet as a senior (1977) - winning the long jump (21-10.75 and the 220-yard dash (22.4 seconds), helping the Bobcats to the OVAC team title. He earned All-Eastern District honors in the 100-yard dash and was recognized as a high school All-American in track.

In basketball, Donley was hampered by his shoulder injury as a senior, but still managed to score 10 points per contest and had a school-record 17-assist game.

His jersey was retired by his high school, he was inducted into the Ohio Valley Athletic Conference Hall of Fame and the Cambridge High School Hall of Fame.

== College career ==
Widely recruited for football, he accepted a scholarship from Ohio State University, where as the fastest player on the team, he was moved to wide receiver, with the intention of reducing the additional damage he could receive on his problematic shoulder. He was a backup as a freshman, making 2 receptions for 55 yards (eighth on the team), a 27.5-yard average and one touchdown.

Donley became a starter as a sophomore, posting 24 receptions for 510 yards (21.3-yard avg.) and 3 touchdowns, including a 78-yard touchdown against the University of Iowa. As a junior, he had 37 receptions for 800 yards (21.6-yard avg.) and 5 touchdowns.

As a senior, he registered 43 receptions for 887 yards (school record), a 20.6-yard average and 7 touchdowns, which was the third straight season that he led the team in receiving. He played in his fourth bowl game, while being named All-Big Ten and honorable-mention All-American.

He left as the school's All-time leading wide receiver in career receptions (106), receiving yards (2,252), average yards per reception (21.2) and receiving touchdowns (16).

== Professional career ==
=== Dallas Cowboys ===
The Dallas Cowboys liked his athletic potential and ignored his previous chronic shoulder injury, selecting him in the second round (53rd overall) of the 1981 NFL draft. As a rookie, he was the second fastest player on the team behind Tony Dorsett. He only played in 17 games in his first 2 seasons, making 5 receptions for 55 yards and no touchdowns.

In 1983, he led the team with a 20.6-yard reception average. He missed five games because of a knee injury, posting 18 receptions for 370 yards (sixth on the team) and two touchdowns.

In 1984 with the retirement of Drew Pearson, he started 9 games over new addition Mike Renfro, but was limited by shoulder and hamstring injuries. He tallied 32 receptions for 473 yards (fourth on the team) and 2 touchdowns. That year, he also participated in the Pro Football 60-yard dash at the Dallas Times Herald Invitational Track Meet, where he placed fourth with a time of 6.33 seconds.

Donley had a short career because of injuries and was forced into early retirement, after the Cowboys waived him injured on April 3, 1985. In his career, he had 55 receptions for 898 yards and 4 touchdowns.

=== Chicago Bears ===
On May 21, 1986, after originally announcing his retirement the previous year, he was signed as a free agent by the Chicago Bears, reuniting with head coach and former Cowboys assistant coach Mike Ditka.

He was looked upon to replace the injured Dennis McKinnon, but Donley ended up being placed on the injured reserve list on September 6, after breaking a bone in his hand. He wasn't re-signed at the end of the season.

== Personal life ==
Donley is owner and president of Advantage Hole in One in Dallas, Texas. He is married to Dina Donley and also has 2 sons: Jake and Drew Donley.
