= Marion Barber Jr. =

American football player (born 1959)

No. 31
- Position: Running back

Personal information
- Born: December 6, 1959 (age 66); Fort Lauderdale, Florida, U.S.
- Listed height: 6 ft 3 in (1.91 m)
- Listed weight: 224 lb (102 kg)

Career information
- High school: Chadsey (Detroit, Michigan)
- College: Minnesota
- NFL draft: 1981: 2nd round, 30th overall pick

Career history
- New York Jets (1982–1989)

Awards and highlights
- 2× First-team All-Big Ten (1978, 1980); Second-team All-Big Ten (1979)

Career NFL statistics
- Rushing yards: 317
- Rushing average: 4.3
- Rushing touchdowns: 3
- Receptions: 25
- Receiving yards: 209
- Receiving touchdowns: 1
- Stats at Pro Football Reference

Marion Sylvester Barber Jr. (born December 6, 1959) is an American former professional football player who was a running back for the New York Jets of the National Football League (NFL) from 1982 to 1988. He played college football for the Minnesota Golden Gophers.

== Early life ==
Barber attended Chadsey High School in Detroit, Michigan, and is the son of Marion Sylvester Barber. He went on to play running back at the University of Minnesota where he finished as the all-time record holder for rushing yards (3,094), rushing touchdowns (34), and 100-yard rushing games (12) in a career. Those records have since been broken.

== Professional career ==
Barber was drafted by the New York Jets in the second round (30th overall) of the 1981 NFL draft.

== Personal life ==
He is the father of the late former Dallas Cowboys Pro Bowl running back Marion Barber III, former Houston Texans safety Dominique Barber, and former Minnesota Golden Gophers linebacker Thomas Barber, who is now a defensive graduate assistant for the Gophers. All of his sons played at the University of Minnesota.

Barber Jr. graduated from the university with a degree in youth studies in 2017, almost 40 years after he played for the Golden Gophers.
